= Lotteries by country =

A lottery is a form of gambling which involves selling numbered tickets and giving prizes to the holders of numbers drawn at random. Lotteries are outlawed by some governments, while others endorse it to the extent of organizing their own national (state) lottery. It is common to find some degree of regulation by governments, like allowing or prohibiting online sales of tickets.

== Countries with a national lottery ==
=== Africa ===
- Ethiopia: Ethiopian National Lottery Administration
- Ghana: weekly and daily games (see National Lottery Authority of Ghana)
- Kenya: Toto 6/49, Kenya Charity Sweepstakes
- Mauritius: Loto & Loto+, Loto Vert
- Mozambique: Instant Lottery, Totobola, Totoloto, and Joker
- Nigeria: SET Lotto, Premier Lotto (Baba Ijebu), Give N Take, Green Lotto
- South Africa: LOTTO, PowerBall, SPORTSTAKE, RAFFLE, EAZiWIN (see South African National Lottery)
- South Sudan: National Lottery of South Sudan
- Uganda: Billion Lotto

=== Asia ===
- Bhutan: Bhutan Lottery Limited
- China: Welfare Lottery, Sports Lottery
- Hong Kong: Mark Six
- Japan: Takarakuji
- Laos: Huay Phatthana (ຫວຍພັດທະນາ)
- Macau: Pacapio
- Malaysia: Magnum Berhad, Da Ma Cai, Sports Toto, Sandakan 4D, Sabah 88 4D, Special CashSweep, Big Sweep
- Mongolia: 6D, Lotto
- Myanmar: Aungbalay (အောင်ဘာလေ) Nwayoohti (အောင်လံလွှင့်ချီ နွေဦးထီ)
- Philippines: PCSO Lottery Draw
- Singapore: Singapore Pools
- South Korea: Lotto 6/45, Speeto (500, 1000, 2000), Pension Lottery 720+ (generally called 'Bok-Kwon', 복권)
- Sri Lanka: National Lottery, Development Lottery
- Taiwan: Taiwan Lottery
- Thailand: "Government Lottery", also called lottery or หวย (huay), which comes from the Chinese word meaning flower.
- Vietnam: Vietlott

=== Middle East and North Africa ===
- Algeria: Loto Erriadhi, Pari Sportif Algerien
- Lebanon: Loto, Zeed, Yawmiyeh (3, 4, 5), Yanassib
- Egypt: Egypt National Lottery
- Morocco: Loterie Nationale
- Israel: Mifal HaPais
- UAE: The UAE Lottery (only licensed lottery following the establishment of the General Commercial Gaming Regulatory Authority)

=== Europe ===
- (Austria) (Belgium) (Republic of Ireland) (France) (Luxembourg) (Portugal) (Spain) (Switzerland) (United Kingdom) Pan-European: European House Lottery, EuroMillions
- (Croatia) (Czech Republic) (Denmark) (Estonia) (Finland) (Germany) (Greece) (Hungary) (Iceland) (Italy) (Latvia) (Lithuania) (Netherlands) (Norway) (Poland) (Slovakia) (Slovenia) (Spain) (Sweden) Pan-European: European House Lottery, Eurojackpot
- (Norway) (Sweden) (Denmark) (Iceland) (Finland) (Estonia) (Latvia) (Lithuania) (Slovenia) (Belgium) Nordic and Baltic countries: Vikinglotto
- (Austria) (Belgium) (Republic of Ireland) (France) (Luxembourg) (Portugal) (Spain) (Switzerland) Pan-European: EuroDreams
- Austria: Österreichische Lotterien: Lotto 6 aus 45, EuroMillions and Zahlenlotto
- Belgium: Loterie Nationale or Nationale Loterij (Lotto 6/45, Joker+, Keno, Pick 3), Vikinglotto and EuroMillions
- Bulgaria: The state lottery is organized by the Bulgarian Sports Totalizator (Bulgarian: Български спортен тотализатор). Its most popular game is TOTO 2 (6/49, 6/42, 5/35, 5/50+1/12). Private lotteries included Lottery Bulgaria (Bulgarian: Лотария България) and National Lottery (Bulgarian: Национална лотария, but in 2019 private owned lotteries were forbidden by the law in Bulgaria.
- (Jersey) (Guernsey) Channel Islands: Channel Islands Lottery
- Croatia: Hrvatska Lutrija: Loto 7/35, Loto 6/45, Joker, Bingo(15/90, Plus, 24/75), Keno, Sve ili Ništa(11/22)
- Czech Republic: Sazka(Sportka(6/49), Euromilióny, Lucky 10), Fortuna(3/21, 6/36, 9/49, Keno), Korunka
- Denmark: Lotto(7/36), Joker, Klasselotteriet, Landbrugslotteriet
- Estonia: Eesti Loto (Jokker, Keno, Bingo Loto, Vikinglotto, Eurojackpot)
- Finland: Lotto(7/40), scratch tickets, racing & football pools (Veikkaus)
- France: La Française des Jeux: Loto(5/49+1/10), Keno, Joker+
- Germany: Lotto 6 aus 49, Spiel 77, Super 6, Glückspirale, Keno, Plus 5
- Greece: OPAP (Greek: ΟΠΑΠ – Οργανισμός Προγνωστικών Αγώνων Ποδοσφαίρου), Lotto 6/49, Joker 5/45 + 1/20, Proto, Kino, Extra 5, Super 3
- Hungary: Lottó (5/90 6/45 and 7/35), Joker, Kenó, Luxor, Puttó and EuroJackpot
- Iceland: Lottó, Jóker
- Ireland: The National Lottery (Irish: An Chrannchur Náisiúnta), Daily Millions and EuroMillions
- Isle of Man: Participates in The United Kingdom National Lottery and EuroMillions, previously had Isle of Man Lottery.
- Italy: Lotto (IGT Lottery), SuperEnalotto (Sisal), Win for Life (Sisal), 10eLotto (IGT Lottery), VinciCasa (Sisal), MillionDAY (IGT Lottery), Play Your Date (Sisal), Lotteria Italia (IGT Lottery), Gratta e Vinci (IGT Lottery).
- Latvia: Latloto, SuperBingo, Keno, Loto 5, Joker, Joker 7
- Lithuania: Teleloto, Keno Loto, Jėga, Dienos Loto.
- Liechtenstein: International Lottery in Liechtenstein Foundation
- Luxembourg: EuroMillions, Lotto 6 aus 49, High 5
- Malta: Super 5, Super 5 Plus, Super 5-4-3-2-1, Super 5-4-3-2-1 Plus, Lotto, Pick 3
- Montenegro: Lutrija Crne Gore
- Netherlands: Nationale Postcode Loterij, Nederlandse Loterij
- North Macedonia: Lotarija na Makedonija(Loto 7, Joker)
- Norway: Lotto(7/34), Joker, Extra, Keno, Tipping, scratch tickets (Norsk Tipping)
- Poland: Lotto + Lotto Plus (6/49), Mini Lotto (5/42), Kaskada (12/24), Multi Multi (20/80), Ekstra Pensja (5/35 + 1/4), Szybkie 600 (6/32)
- Portugal: Totoloto, Lotaria Clássica, EuroMillions and Lotaria Popular
- Romania: Loteria Română (6/49, 5/40, Joker, Noroc, Super Noroc, Noroc Plus)
- Belarus: Superloto, Sport Pari(Sportloto 5/36, Sportloto 6/49, Keno, Blitz), Toloto
- Russia: Stoloto (Russian: Cтолото), National Lottery (Russian: Национальная Лотерея)
- Serbia: Loto, Loto+, Loto 5, Joker, Bingo, Bingo+ (Serbian: Državna Lutrija Srbije)
- Slovakia: Tipos(Loto, Loto 5 z 35, Joker, Euromilióny, Keno 10)
- Slovenia: Loterija Slovenije (number games: Loto and Loto Plus(6/44); 3x3 Plus 6, Joker)
- Spain: Loterías y Apuestas del Estado, ONCE and Loteria de Catalunya
- Sweden: Svenska Spel: Lotto 1 & 2(7/35), Joker, Keno
- Switzerland: Swisslos: Swiss Lotto, EuroMillions Loterie Romande: Swiss Loto, EuroMillions, Magic 3, Magic 4, and Banco
- Turkey: The National Lottery Administration under the name of Milli Piyango including Çılgın Sayısal Loto(6/90), Süper Loto(6/60), Şans Topu(5/34 + 1/14), On Numara and jackpots are NO state-run company. The Milli Piyango Idaresi was privatised by Demiroren Holding in 2019.
- Ukraine: State Lotteries Operator M.S.L. (Ukrainian: Оператор державних лотерей "М.С.Л."), Ukrayinska Natsionalna Lotereya (Ukrainian: Українська Нацiональна Лотерея, lit. 'Ukrainian National Lottery')
- United Kingdom: The National Lottery, the main game being Lotto, then Thunderball and Set for Life. Also the Health Lottery is available in Great Britain only.

=== North America ===
- (United States Virgin Islands) (Anguilla) (Saint Kitts and Nevis) (Antigua and Barbuda) (Sint Maarten) Caribbean Lottery, Super Lotto
- Barbados: Barbados Lottery (multiple games), Super Lotto
- Belize: Boledo, Mega Bingo, Fantasy-5, Pick 3
- Canada: Lotto 6/49, Lotto Max, Daily Grand, Atlantic Lottery Corporation, British Columbia Lottery Corporation, Ontario Lottery and Gaming Corporation, Loto-Québec, Western Canada Lottery Corporation
- Costa Rica: Lotería Nacional, Chances Lotería Popular, Lotto, Lotto Revancha, Nuevos Tiempos, 3 Monazos
- Dominican Republic: Lotería Electrónica Internacional Dominicana S.A.
- El Salvador: Lotería Nacional de Beneficencia, Lotín (scratch cards)
- Honduras: SuperPremio(6/33), Diaria, Premia2, Pega 3, Jugá Tres
- Jamaica: Supreme Ventures Limited, Super Lotto
- Mexico: Lotería Nacional para la Asistencia Pública and Pronósticos para la Asistencia Pública
- Nicaragua: Lotería Nacional, Diaria, Premia2, Jugá3, Terminación2, Fechas
- Panama: Lotería Nacional de Beneficencia
- United States: state lotteries in almost every state, along with two multi-state lotteries Mega Millions and Powerball

=== Oceania ===
- Australia: state lotteries in every state and territory, along with several national games operated by The Lottery Corporation (TLC). There are also health lotteries.
- New Zealand: Lotto New Zealand

=== South America ===
- Argentina: Quiniela, Loto and various others
- Bolivia: Lotería Nacional de Beneficencia y Salubridad
- Brazil: Mega-Sena, Lotofácil and various others
- Chile: Polla Chilena de Beneficencia S.A.
- Colombia: Baloto, Caribeña Día, Lotería de Bogotá, Lotería de Medellín, Sinuano Noche and various others
- Ecuador: Lotería Nacional
- Peru: Intralot Perú SA (La Tinka).
- Uruguay: Quiniela, La Tómbola, 5 de Oro, El Gordo
- Venezuela: Lotería del Táchira, Lotería de Caracas, Lotería del Zulia, Triple Gordo, and various others

== Country details ==
=== Asia ===
==== India ====
There are many lottery games that take place in India, all of which are run by state government organizations under the rules and regulations of the federal government. Before 1967 private lotteries were allowed but were later banned in favour for state lotteries.

State governments such as those of Kerala, Punjab, Nagaland, Goa and Sikkim, run their own lottery departments and conduct weekly lottery draws and occasional bumper lottery draws. Government lottery is currently legal in 13 Indian states.

Kerala State Lotteries, established in 1967, under the lottery department by the Government of Kerala was the first of its kind in India. The department was successful and has grown throughout the state of Kerala by contributing to the needful and became the role model for other states for starting their own lotteries. According to the department, it had a profit of Rs 788.42 crore in the 2013-14 financial year, the largest ever, while it made Rs 681.76 crore in profit in 2012-13. When the state lottery was started in 1967, the total revenue from sales was only Rs 20 lakh. The profit alone touched Rs 625.74 crore in 2009-2010 and Rs 557.69 crore in 2010-2011. The department now boasts of more than 35,000 authorized agents and over 100,000 retail sellers. It is currently the largest lottery network in India with thousands of agents and vendors involved.

The Kerala lottery was created as a mean to generate revenue to help the poor and the needy belonging to marginalized sections of society. The profits from state lotteries sponsor several welfare programs. One of these is the Karunya Benevolent Fund Scheme that provides financial assistance to under-privileged people suffering from acute ailments like Cancer, Haemophilia, Kidney and Heart diseases and for Palliative Care.

Regardless of the different regulations of the states, it is required to be at least 18 years old to be allowed to play the lottery, no matter whether online or offline, in India.

On January 8, 2003, the state government of Tamil Nadu banned the sale of all forms of lottery by agencies from and outside the state. This ban has been upheld by successive governments. But it has been withdrawn and for the last few years Kerala and all other State Government lotteries are being sold in Tamil Nadu.

In the states where lotteries are banned some players search for online alternatives giving way for online lotteries in India. Legislation is different from state to state where states like Punjab have legislation for online lotteries and states like Bihar have set up explicit bans on all lotteries.

==== Japan ====
During the Edo period, some the Shrine Temple received official permission to operate lotteries, which led to a surge in their popularity. However, this practice was later banned under the Meiji-era Penal Code, possibly starting with a Cabinet Order in 1869. Despite the prohibition, illegal lotteries continued to flourish in urban areas, especially in more shadowy or unregulated parts of the cities.

On July 16, 1945 during the Second World War, the country would release "winning cards" in order to finance war expenses. As a result of lack of goods, prize prizes (cigarettes and kanakin (cotton calico)) were popularized but lost before the draw. After the war in 1948, local Japanese governments were permitted to release lottery tickets by the voting warrant certificate method.

Under Japanese law, it is illegal to purchase lottery tickets in Japan that are issued by foreign governments or overseas organizations. This is outlined in Article 187, Paragraph 3 of Japan's Criminal Code, which refers to the offense as the “Lucky Ticket Acceptance Crime.” Official advertisements by local governments, trust banks, and the Japan Lottery Association also clearly state this prohibition.

=== Europe ===
==== France ====
The first French lottery was created by King Francis I in or around 1505. After that first attempt, lotteries were forbidden for two centuries. They reappeared at the end of the 17th century, as a "public lottery" for the Paris municipality (called Loterie de L'Hotel de Ville) and as "private" ones for religious orders, mostly for nuns in convents.

Lotteries quickly became one of the most important resources for religious congregations in the 18th century, and helped to build or rebuild about 15 churches in Paris, including St. Sulpice and Le Panthéon. At the beginning of the century, the King avoided having to fund religious orders by giving them the right to run lotteries, but the amounts generated became so large that the second part of the century turned into a struggle between the monarchy and the Church for control of the lotteries. In 1774, the monarchy—specifically Madame de Pompadour—founded the Loterie de L'École Militaire to buy what is called today the Champ de Mars in Paris, and build a military academy that Napoleon Bonaparte would later attend; they also banned all other lotteries, with 3 or 4 minor exceptions. This lottery became known a few years later as the Loterie Royale de France. Just before the French Revolution in 1789, the revenues from La Lotteries Royale de France were equivalent to between 5 and 7% of total French revenues.

There have also been reports of lotteries regarding the mass guillotine executions in France. It has been said that a number was attached to the head of each person to be executed and then after all the executions, the executioner would pull out one head and the people with the number that matched the one on the head were awarded prizes (usually small ones); each number was 3-to-5 digits long.

Throughout the 18th century, philosophers like Voltaire as well as some bishops complained that lotteries exploit the poor. This subject has generated much oral and written debate over the morality of the lottery. All lotteries (including state lotteries) were frowned upon by idealists of the French Revolution, who viewed them as a method used by the rich for cheating the poor out of their wages.

The Lottery reappeared again in 1936, called lotto, when socialists needed to increase state revenue. Since that time, La Française des Jeux (government owned) has had a monopoly on most of the games in France, including the lotteries.

==== Germany ====
The German national lottery runs Lotto 6aus49, Super6, Spiel77, and Glücksspirale. The highest jackpot ever won was a Eurojackpot drawing on 14 October 2016 of €90 million.

==== Italy ====
On 20 September 2005 a primary school boy in Italy won the equivalent of £27.6 million in the Italian national lottery. Although children are not allowed to gamble under Italian law, children are allowed to play the lottery.

==== Liechtenstein ====
The International Lottery in Liechtenstein Foundation (ILLF) is a government-authorized and state-controlled charitable foundation that operates Internet lotteries. The ILLF pioneered Internet gaming, having launched the web's first online lottery, PLUS Lotto, in 1995 and processed the first online gaming transaction ever. The ILLF also introduced the first instant scratchcard games on the Internet during this time. The ILLF supports charitable projects and organizations domestically and internationally.

The ILLF operates many websites, referred to as the ILLF brands. Combined, these brands offer an array of games for sale.

Lottery winnings are not taxed in Liechtenstein.

==== Spain ====
The annual Spanish Christmas Lottery is considered the world's largest lottery, as its prize pool averages €2.4 billion. It is managed by the state-owned Loterías y Apuestas del Estado. Its top prize/jackpot of €4 million is awarded to—not split by—up to 180 winning tickets. The lottery regulator in Spain has other traditional lotteries such as Lotería Nacional or Lotería del Niño, in addition, there are active games such as La Primitiva, Bonoloto, Euromillones, Quiniela, among others, which can be purchased directly from the Loterías y Apuestas del Estado website and physical points.

The blind charity ONCE operates a lottery. Sellers are mostly blind or otherwise handicapped.

The Government of Catalonia operates Loteria de Catalunya.

==== United Kingdom ====
The National Lottery was established in 1994 and is regulated by the Gambling Commission. In 2004, its operator Camelot Group launched EuroMillions for players in the UK, France, and Spain. Now, it is played on a pan-European basis. A privately run lottery called The Health Lottery launched in 2011.

=== North America ===
==== Canada ====
In Canada prior to 1967 buying a ticket on the Irish Sweepstakes was illegal. In that year the federal Liberal government introduced a special law (an Omnibus Bill) intended to bring up-to-date a number of obsolete laws. Pierre Trudeau, the Minister of Justice at that time, sponsored the bill. On September 12, 1967, Mr. Trudeau announced that his government would insert an amendment concerning lotteries.

Even while the Omnibus Bill was still being written, Montreal mayor Jean Drapeau, trying to recover some of the money spent on the World's Fair and the new subway system, announced a "voluntary tax". For a $2.00 "donation" a player would be eligible to participate in a draw with a grand prize of $100,000. According to Drapeau, this "tax" was not a lottery for two reasons. The prizes were given out in the form of silver bars, not money, and the "competitors" chosen in a drawing would have to reply correctly to four questions about Montreal during a second draw. That competition would determine the value of the prize that the winner would win. The replies to the questions were printed on the back of the ticket and therefore the questions would not cause any undue problems. The inaugural draw was held on May 27, 1968.

There were debates in Ottawa and Quebec City about the legality of this 'voluntary tax'. The Minister of Justice alleged it was a lottery. Montreal's mayor replied that it did not contravene the federal law. While everyone awaited the verdict, the monthly draws went off without a hitch. Players from all over Canada, the United States, Europe, and Asia participated.

On September 14, 1968 the Quebec Appeal Court declared Mayor Drapeau's "voluntary tax" illegal. However, the municipal authorities did not give up the struggle; the Council announced in November that the City would appeal this decision to the Supreme Court.

As the debate over legalities continued, sales dropped significantly, because many people did not want to participate in anything illegal. Despite offers of new prizes the revenue continued to drop monthly, and by the nineteenth and final draw, was only a little over $800 000.

On December 23, 1969 an amendment was made to the Canada's Criminal Code, allowing a provincial government to legally operate lottery systems.

The first provincial lottery in Canada was Quebec's Inter-Loto in 1970. Other provinces and regions introduced their own lotteries through the 1970s, and the federal government ran Loto Canada (originally the Olympic Lottery) for several years starting in the late 1970s to help recoup the expenses of the 1976 Summer Olympics. Lottery wins are generally not subject to Canadian tax, but may be taxable in other jurisdictions, depending on the residency of the winner.

Today, Canada has three nationwide lotteries: Lotto 6/49, Lotto Max (which replaced Lotto Super 7 in September 2009), and Daily Grand. These games are administered by the Interprovincial Lottery Corporation, which is a consortium of the five regional lottery commissions owned by their respective provincial/territorial governments: Atlantic Lottery Corporation (New Brunswick, Nova Scotia, Prince Edward Island, Newfoundland and Labrador), Loto-Québec (Quebec), Ontario Lottery and Gaming Corporation (Ontario), Western Canada Lottery Corporation (Manitoba, Saskatchewan, Alberta, Yukon, Northwest Territories, Nunavut), and British Columbia Lottery Corporation (British Columbia).

48% of total sales are allocated for the jackpot. The remaining 52% is used for administration and given to charity. As you can see, a substantial amount of the money generated by the lottery is allocated to support community initiatives, education, and healthcare programs. Consequently, those who play are not only participating for a chance to win but are also indirectly contributing to the nation's progress.

==== United States ====
In the United States, the existence of lotteries is subject to the laws of each jurisdiction; there is no national lottery.

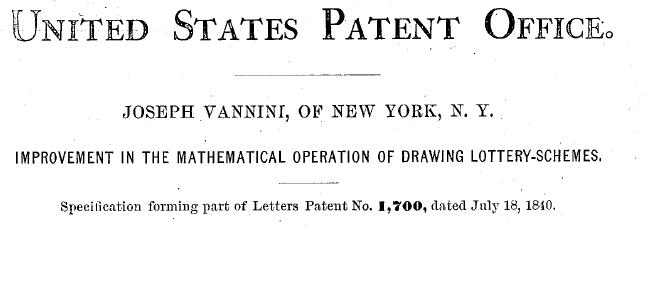
Header from 1840 US patent on a new type of private lottery

Private lotteries were legal in the US in the early 19th century. In fact, a number of US patents were granted on new types of lotteries. In today's vernacular, these would be considered business method patents.

Before the advent of government-sponsored lotteries, many illegal lotteries thrived; see Numbers game and Peter H. Matthews. The oldest continuing government-run lottery in the US was established in Puerto Rico in 1934; the oldest continuing lottery on the US mainland began in 1964 in New Hampshire. As of 2011, lotteries are established in 43 states, the District of Columbia, Puerto Rico, and the US Virgin Islands;

The first modern US multi-jurisdictional lottery was formed in 1985, linking Maine, New Hampshire, and Vermont. In 1988, the Multi-State Lottery Association (MUSL) was formed with Oregon, Iowa, Kansas, Rhode Island, West Virginia, Missouri, and the District of Columbia as its charter members; it is best known for Powerball, which was designed to build up very large jackpots. The other major US multi-jurisdictional game, then known as The Big Game (now called Mega Millions), was formed in 1996 by Georgia, Illinois, Massachusetts, Maryland, Michigan and Virginia as its charter members. In late 2009, MUSL and the Mega Millions consortium agreed to allow US jurisdictions then with either game to sell tickets for both beginning January 31, 2010. As of April 13, 2011, Mega Millions is available in 43 jurisdictions, with Powerball in 44; both games are available in 42 jurisdictions.

Instant lottery tickets, also known as scratch cards, were introduced in the 1970s, becoming a major source of US lottery revenue. Some jurisdictions have introduced keno and/or video lottery terminals (slot machines in all but name).

Other major US lotteries include Cashola, Hot Lotto, and Wild Card 2, some of MUSL's other games. (Cashola ended May 2011.)

With the advent of the Internet it became possible for people to play lottery-style games on-line, many times for free (the cost of the ticket being supplemented by merely seeing an ad or some other form of revenue). GTech Corporation, headquartered in West Greenwich, Rhode Island, administers 70% of worldwide online and instant lottery business, according to its website. With online gaming rules generally prohibitive, "lottery" games face less scrutiny. This is leading to the increase in web sites offering lottery ticket purchasing services, charging premiums on base lottery prices. The legality of such services falls into question across many jurisdictions, especially throughout the United States, as the gambling laws related to lottery play generally have not kept pace with the spread of technology.

Presently, large portions of many American state lotteries are used to fund public education systems.

=== Oceania ===
==== Australia ====
In Australia, lotteries operators are licensed at a state or territory level, and include both state government-owned and private sector companies.

The first lottery game in Australia took place in the 1880s in Sydney, the capital of the country. It was a private sweepstakes that was quickly prohibited, despite being moved to other areas such as Queensland and Victoria. In 1916, the Australian government started their own lottery, named the 'Golden Casket Art Union', with the intention of raising money for charities and projects. Its first draw is credited with raising funds for veterans of World War One.

Lotteries in Australia are now operated by Tatts Group under Government licence in each State or Territory with the exception of Western Australia.

Australia also supports online lottery sales with two licensed re-sellers, Netlotto Pty Ltd and Jumbo Interactive which sell Australian lottery products through their websites.

==== New Zealand ====
Lotteries in New Zealand are controlled by the Government through an autonomous Crown entity, Lotto New Zealand (formally the New Zealand Lotteries Commission). Lottery profits are distributed by the New Zealand Lottery Grants Board directly to charities and community organizations. Sport and Recreation New Zealand, Creative New Zealand and the New Zealand Film Commission are statutory bodies that operate autonomously in distributing their allocations from the Lottery Grants Board.

Lotto New Zealand was formed in 1987 and replaced New Zealand's original national lotteries, the Art Union and Golden Kiwi. Lotto has four games: the Lotto (including Powerball and Strike), Keno, Bullseye, and Instant Kiwi scratch card games.

Lottery winnings are not taxed in New Zealand.
