= TheLotter =

Lottery ticket purchasing service

TheLotter Group
- Trade name: TheLotter
- Type: Private
- Industry: Lottery betting and Online gambling
- Founded: 2002; 24 years ago
- Headquarters: Birkirkara, Malta
- Area served: Worldwide

TheLotter is a worldwide online lottery ticket purchasing and courier service. TheLotter offers more than 50 types of draws, including the US Powerball, Mega Millions, EuroMillions, SuperEnalotto, EuroJackpot, and the Australian Powerball; U.S. customers can purchase entries to local and multi-state lotteries through TheLotter.us, a platform that offers courier services for official lottery tickets in applicable states.

== History ==
Founded in 2002, TheLotter has facilitated the distribution of over $100 million in prizes to more than 7 million winners globally.

TheLotter operates as a courier service, with agents physically purchasing official lottery tickets on their customers' behalf. The tickets are then scanned and uploaded to the customer's account before the draw.

== Products ==
In addition to lottery ticket purchasing and courier services, TheLotter offers digital scratchcards, online casino games, and raffles; with availability depending on jurisdiction.

Players can access TheLotter online or through its mobile apps for iOS and Android.

== Winners ==
In December 2015, the story of an Iraqi man who won $6.4 million in the Oregon Megabucks lottery after purchasing his tickets at TheLotter was widely reported around the world. The win was controversial for a number of reasons. The Oregon Lottery launched an investigation into whether international lottery ticket sales were legal. Chuck Baumann, spokesman for the Oregon Lottery, said there were no restrictions on foreigners winning prizes in the lottery or buying tickets through an online agent. According to Jack Roberts, director of the Oregon Lottery, the winner had done nothing wrong and most importantly, had all six winning numbers on his ticket. The Oregon Lottery made an exception on the winner’s behalf in lieu of potential risks to his family in Iraq and allowed him to remain anonymous.

In July 2017, Aura D. from Panama won a $30 million Florida Lotto jackpot after purchasing her ticket at TheLotter.

== United States ==
TheLotter operates in the United States as TheLotter US and has its US headquarters registered as 101 Crawfords Corner Rd., Holmdel, New Jersey, 07733. Currently, TheLotter US offers its services in five states: Oregon, Minnesota, New York, New Jersey and Arizona.

In New Jersey, TheLotter US is registered as an official lottery courier service. In New York, it is officially licensed by the New York State Gaming Commission.

== Licenses ==
TheLotter currently holds licenses from national supervisory bodies in Malta, Sweden, Australia, Mexico and the Isle of Man. Additionally, the company operates in the United States, offering its services in New York, New Jersey, Minnesota, Oregon, Arizona.

== Company information ==
TheLotter is operated by Lotto Direct Limited, a company registered in Malta (registration number: C77583) having its registered office at Vision Exchange Building, Level 1, Triq it-Territorials, Zone 1, Central Business District, CBD 1070, Birkirkara.

TheLotter US is operated by NJ Lotto LLC, and lists its registered office at 101 Crawfords Corner Rd., Holmdel, New Jersey, 07733.
