= Sisal (disambiguation) =

Sisal is a flowering plant native to Mexico.

Sisal may also refer to:

- SISAL, a programming language (defined 1983)
- Sisal (company), Italy (founded 1945)
- Sisal, Yucatán, Mexico
