= MegaHits =

MegaHits was a video lottery terminal (VLT) multiple-progressive jackpot game that began on July 15, 2011, and ended on July 31, 2018. MegaHits replaced Cashola, which was offered from July 2006 to May 15, 2011. Cashola was offered at lottery-run casinos in Delaware, Rhode Island, and West Virginia; the same three lotteries take part in MegaHits. In 2013, three of Ohio's casinos started offering MegaHits; the following year, four of Maryland's casinos started offering it. As of April 2016, fifteen lottery-run casinos offered MegaHits.

MegaHits featured five progressive jackpots, unlike Cashola, where only the top prize rolled until it was won. Except for the jackpot that was won if a player making the maximum wager spun nine "MegaHits" symbols (which can be won from any MegaHits machine and therefore is fed by all its players regardless of amount wagered) the progressive jackpot pools for spinning five to eight "MegaHits" symbols were won within each MegaHits member. As an example, the game's four progressives within Delaware were fed only by MegaHits wagers in Delaware, while the top progressive (whose starting jackpot is $100,000) was fed by all MegaHits wagers in the five states.

Unlike Cashola, whose jackpot was annuitized with a cash option, all MegaHits progressives were paid in cash, including the linked progressive.

International Game Technology supplied the VLTs that were used by MegaHits players.
