= WLC =

WLC or wlc may refer to:

== Education ==
- Warrior Leader Course (now known as Basic Leader Course or BLC), a course of study for non-commissioned officers in the US Army
- West London College (1977-2017), an independent college of further and higher education
- Wisconsin Lutheran College, a liberal arts college affiliated with the Wisconsin Evangelical Lutheran Synod
- Woods Learning Center, an academic program in Casper, Wyoming

== Sporting ==
- World Lacrosse Championship, international men's field lacrosse championship
- World Lethwei Championship, Martial arts promotion
- World Logging Championship, a competition between foresters

== Technology ==
- Weighted least-connection, a scheduling algorithm used by load balancing software such as Linux Virtual Server
- Live Mesh (formerly Windows Live Core), a data synchronization system for computing devices
- Windows Live Calendar, a time-management web application by Microsoft as part of its Windows Live services
- Wireless LAN Controller, computer networking device
- Wireless charging (a.k.a. inductive charging) of mobile devices

== Other uses ==
- Comorian languages, Mwali dialect (ISO 639-3 code)
- Waltham Cross railway station, Hertfordshire (National Rail station code)
- West Lothian Council, a Scottish local authority
- Westminster Larger Catechism, a central catechism of Calvinists in the English tradition
- Westminster Leningrad Codex, one of the oldest manuscripts of the complete Hebrew Bible
- White-lined chipboard, a paperboard grade
- Wildrose Loyalty Coalition, a political party in Alberta, Canada
- William Lane Craig, an American philosopher of religion and Christian apologist
- World Lotto Corporation, an official European lottery site and platinum marketing partner of the International Lottery in Liechtenstein Foundation
- Worm-like chain, a model in polymer physics
- Women's Liberation Center, former organization in New York City
