= Lottery betting =

Betting on lottery outcomes

Lottery betting is the activity of predicting the results of a lottery draw and placing a wager on the outcome. Lottery betting (also known as lotto betting) is a form of online gambling, run by licensed betting firms, where players place bets on the outcome of lottery draws instead of buying physical or online tickets via official lottery operators.

By betting on the outcome of a lottery draw, rather than purchasing an official ticket, players are able to take part in international and state lottery draws that are usually out of their jurisdiction. For example, a resident of the United Kingdom could place a bet on the outcome of an American lottery drawing, such as Mega Millions or Powerball, even though they would not be eligible to buy official tickets.

== Models ==
=== Insurance-based ===
Most betting firms that provide lottery betting operate using an insurance-backed model.

Companies using this model are not required to purchase tickets from official lottery operators. Instead, when a player places a wager on a lottery, the company then forwards this bet to a third-party insurance company. The betting company pays a set fee for every wager placed to the insurance company in order to offset the risk of a large lottery prize being won. If a player wins a large prize (such as a jackpot), the insurance company pays the betting company, who subsequently give the money to the winning player. In the event of small prize wins, the betting firm will typically pay the prize directly to the player from their own funds.

Insurance-backed lottery betting firms are required to hold betting licenses in the jurisdictions they wish to operate.

=== Ticket reseller ===
Companies operating using a ticket reseller model purchase tickets for the official lottery draw on behalf of the player. The company then charges the player the price of the ticket, as well as an extra commission. In the event of a winning ticket, the company collects the winnings from the official lottery operators and then forwards the winnings on to the player. Lottery messenger services earn income from charging a service fee for the tickets they sell. This fee goes towards paying staff and maintaining the quality of the website.

== Types of bets ==
=== Draw betting ===
Betting on the outcome of lottery draws is the most common form of lottery betting. This follows the same format as purchasing online lottery tickets in that players follow the same ruleset as found on the official lottery draw. Typically, this means that players choose the same amount of numbers and win the same prizes if they match these numbers, as they would have if purchasing an official ticket. The cost of betting on a lottery can differ from the cost of purchasing an official lottery ticket.

=== Number betting ===
With some betting firms, players are also able to bet on certain numbers being drawn, rather than following the ruleset of official lottery operators. For example, a player could bet on just one number being drawn on a specific lottery. With number betting, the betting company can set its own prize amounts and pays out prizes directly to customers.

== Legality ==
Lottery betting is legal in parts of the world where online gambling is permitted, including most European nations, although it is heavily regulated. Companies offering lottery betting services are required by law to hold a relevant gambling license for the jurisdiction of their customers. Following a year of consultation, the British Government banned third-party betting on the EuroMillions lottery in April 2018. This was, in part, due to its violation of the Gambling Act 2005, and "closed the loophole" used by betting companies to allow gamblers to bet on international lotteries in the UK.
