= Pho Hlaing =

- ဘိုးလှိုင်
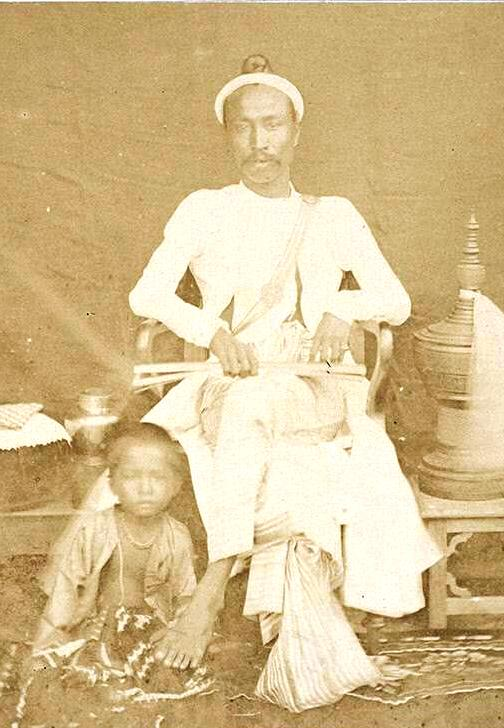

Minister of the Interior of Yaw
- Monarchs: King Mindon; King Thibaw

Personal details
- Born: 21 March 1830; Friday, 10th waxing of Late Tagu 1191 ME Ywapale village, Myingyan District, Konbaung Burma
- Died: 12 August 1883 (aged 53); Friday, 6th waning of Wagaung, 1245 ME Konbaung Burma
- Spouse: Khin Phyu
- Relations: Thado Minhlakyawhtin (father); Me Nyein (mother)

Pho Hlaing (Burmese: ဘိုးလှိုင်, also spelt Hpo Hlaing) was a Burmese noble and civil servant, best known for his treatise, Rājadhammasaṅgaha (ရာဇဓမ္မသင်္ဂဟ), which proposed sweeping reforms to transform Burma's monarchy into a constitutional monarchy and an early advocate of indigenous democracy. Pho Hlaing was an accomplished writer and wrote a number of important treatises throughout his lifetime, on politics, mathematics and Buddhist philosophy.

== Names and titles ==
Pho Hlaing was known by a number of titles and names, including the Yaw Atwinwun (ယောအတွင်းဝန်), Shwepyi Atwinwun (ရွှေပြည်အတွင်းဝန်), Wetmasut Myoza (ဝက်မစွပ်မြို့စား), Magwe Myoza (မကွေးမြို့စား) and posthumously called the Yaw Mingyi (ယောမင်းကြီး) and Shwepyi Mingyi (ရွှေပြည်မင်းကြီး). Atwinwun is roughly analogous to 'Minister of the Interior', Myoza is roughly 'Duke', and Mingyi is a title reserved for the monarch or high-ranking ministers.

== Early life ==
Pho Hlaing was born in 1830 in Ywapale, a small village in Myingyan District in Upper Burma to Thado Minhlakyawhtin (father) and Me Nyein (mother). His father, a royal official (the Lord of Yenangyaung and Minister of Yindaw) at the Konbaung court, had been a minister under King Tharrawaddy, but was killed during a Hluttaw session by the king for alleged disloyalty. Pho Hlaing's great-grandfather was the Minister of Shwepyi (ရွှေပြည်ဝန်ကြီး).

During his early formative years, he joined a local monastery, then led by the Kyabo Sayadaw, as a novice monk (samanera). After the assassination of his father in 1845, Pho Hlaing was given up by his widowed mother to Prince Mindon. He was subsequently adopted by King Tharrawaddy's daughter, Mahadevi. He rejoined the monkhood at his patrons' request, and was educated at royal monasteries and spent some time studying under the Supreme Patriarch, the Bagaya Sayadaw. In the aftermath of the 1852 Second Anglo-Burmese War, Princes Mindon and Kanaung fled Amarapura to overthrow their brother, Pagan. Pho Hlaing, then 22, followed them to Shwebo. That same year, King Pagan abdicated the throne. After this time, Pho Hlaing became a close adviser of the now King Mindon.

== Reign of King Mindon ==
In 1853, Pho Hlaing married Khin Phyu (b. 1833), the daughter of Kyaw U, the Lord of Magwe, who had a distinguished career in the royal service. Pho Hlaing was first appointed as upanissaya (personal assistant) to his father-in-law, who was responsible for the kingdom's foreign affairs. He was also conferred the title Minhlasithu and became the Lord of Yaw (or Yaw Myoza). At the age of 28, Pho Hlaing was promoted to become the Atwinwun of Yaw.

After the assassination of Mindon's heir apparent, Prince Kanaung, Pho Hlaing was put charge of managing industrial projects in the kingdom, including 50 factories and workshops and operating the royal mint, as well as disseminating Western technologies. In 1868, he translated a Sanskrit mathematical text, Lilāvati into Burmese. The following year, he compiled Lipidipika, which included a Burmese language system of the telegraphy code, innovated by Pho Hlaing himself. By 1872, he had been awarded to a salwe of 12 strings. During King Mindon's reign, Pho Hlaing was one of the few officials at the royal court to be allowed to dissent with the king.

Despite Pho Hlaing's close relationship with Mindon (who treated him like a son) in 1871, Pho Hlaing was stripped of his offices as the Shwepyi Wun and Lord of Wetmasut and placed under house arrest, because he was accused of drinking alcohol (specifically beer) and claiming alcohol consumption was not a sin unless imbibed to the point of drunkenness. During his time in house arrest, he wrote Vimuttirasa (ဝိမုတ္တိရသ, The Taste of Freedom), a comparative religion treatise and philosophical critique of world religions. However, he was reinstated less than 6 months afterward, at the intervention of the Khinmagan Sayadaw.

That same year, Pho Hlaing wrote a defining work, a political treatise entitled Mahāsamatavinicchaya (မဟာသမတဝိနိစ္ဆယ, An Analysis of the Head of State), which delineated a social contract between the king and his subjects, as the king did not rule by divine right, but by birthright. In 1875, he wrote Kāyānupassanā (ကာယာနုပဿနာ, Contemplation of the Body), a treatise on anatomy, commissioned by the Princess Lord of Salin. In 1877, he wrote Ten Kinds of Vipassana Insight (ဝိပဿနာဉာဏ်ဆယ်ပါး), commissioned by a high-ranking Buddhist monk. Pho Hlaing also directed the construction of the Atumashi Monastery. In the days leading up to King Mindon's death in 1877, the royal court was in disarray.

== Rājadhammasaṅgaha and the reign of Thibaw ==
In 1878, soon after the coronation of King Thibaw, Mindon's son, Pho Hlaing published a revolutionary work, a three-part political treatise called the Rājadhammasaṅgaha (ရာဇဓမ္မသင်္ဂဟ, variously rendered Companion of Dhamma for Royalty, A Collection of Norms for Kingship, or Civil Society under Monarchy). This work was heavily influenced by Buddhist teachings, particularly the Seven Aparihāniya Principles, a sermon given by the Gautama Buddha on proper governance and summarised as follows:

1. Consultation of a body
2. Action by consensus
3. Behaviour in accordance with the law
4. Respect for the admonishments of superiors
5. No oppression of women
6. Respect for the rites of towns' and villages' spirit guardians
7. Protection of the monkhood

Pho Hlaing's treatise essentially proposed a variety of major political and economic reforms to preserve Burmese sovereignty. These included transforming the kingdom's government system into a constitutional monarchy, whereby the king ruled indirectly by social contract, through a bicameral parliament that was represented by both the aristocracy and commoners, and the king had a cabinet of ministers. These proposals were influenced by England's system of government. The economic reforms suggested by Pho Hlaing included restrictions on royal expenditures, salaries for the royal family and aristocracy, establishment of a national banking system, economic incentives for farmers and traders. Pho Hlaing also analyzed the decline of the Burmese population in the kingdom, coming to the conclusion that excessive taxation was forcing many Burmese to migrate to British-occupied Lower Burma. However, Pho Hlaing's treatise was ignored and rejected. Within 50 days of submitting it to Byedaik (Privy Council), Pho Hlaing was summarily dismissed from his offices.

The first Burmese lottery was introduced during the Konbaung Dynasty. A national state lottery was first established in 1878 during the reign of King Thibaw Min, in an attempt to raise state revenues. The lottery was the brainchild of Pho Hlaing, who had played the French lottery in Paris. Following ongoing issues with the administration of the lottery, including conflicts of interest, decreased revenues, condemnation against gambling by Buddhist monks, the lottery was ended in 1880.

On 12 August 1883, (the sixth waning day of Wagaung 1235 ME), Pho Hlaing died at the age of 53. At his death, Pho Hlaing had the title Thado Mingyi Minhla Mahamingaung Thihathu.

== Works ==
- Lilavati (1868) - Translation of an Indian geometric treatise
- Lipidipika (1869)
- Assabeda (1869)
- Saddasangaha (1869)
- Vimuttirasa or The Taste of Freedom (1871) - comparative religion
- Mahasamatavinicchaya or An Analysis of the Maha Thamata (1871) - a political treatise on social contract
- Kayanupassana or Contemplation of the Body (1875) - anatomy and Buddhist philosophy
- Ten Kinds of Vipassana Insight (1877) - Buddhist philosophy
- Rajadhammasanghaha (1878) - a treatise on constitutional monarchy
- Mahasujataka (1881) - a treatise on Burmese astrology
