= Video lottery terminal =

Electronic gambling machine

A video lottery terminal (VLT), also sometimes known as a video gaming terminal (VGT), video slots, or the video lottery, is a type of electronic gambling machine. They are typically operated by a region's lottery, and situated at licensed establishments such as bars and restaurants.

VLTs typically feature a selection of multiple games, primarily video slot machines and Keno. Their exact operation depends on local law: many VLTs are stand-alone devices containing a random number generator. Each terminal is connected to a centralized computer system that allows the lottery jurisdiction to monitor gameplay and collect its share of revenue. The outcome of each wager on a VLT is random. VLT operators are not able to program the total amount wagered, or payouts, through the central computer system. A minimum percentage payout usually is written into that jurisdiction's law. That percentage is realized not by manipulation of the game, but by adjusting the expected overall payout.

In some jurisdictions, VLTs do not contain a random number generator, and display results from a fixed pool controlled by the central system (in similar fashion to scratch-off lottery tickets).

== Canada ==
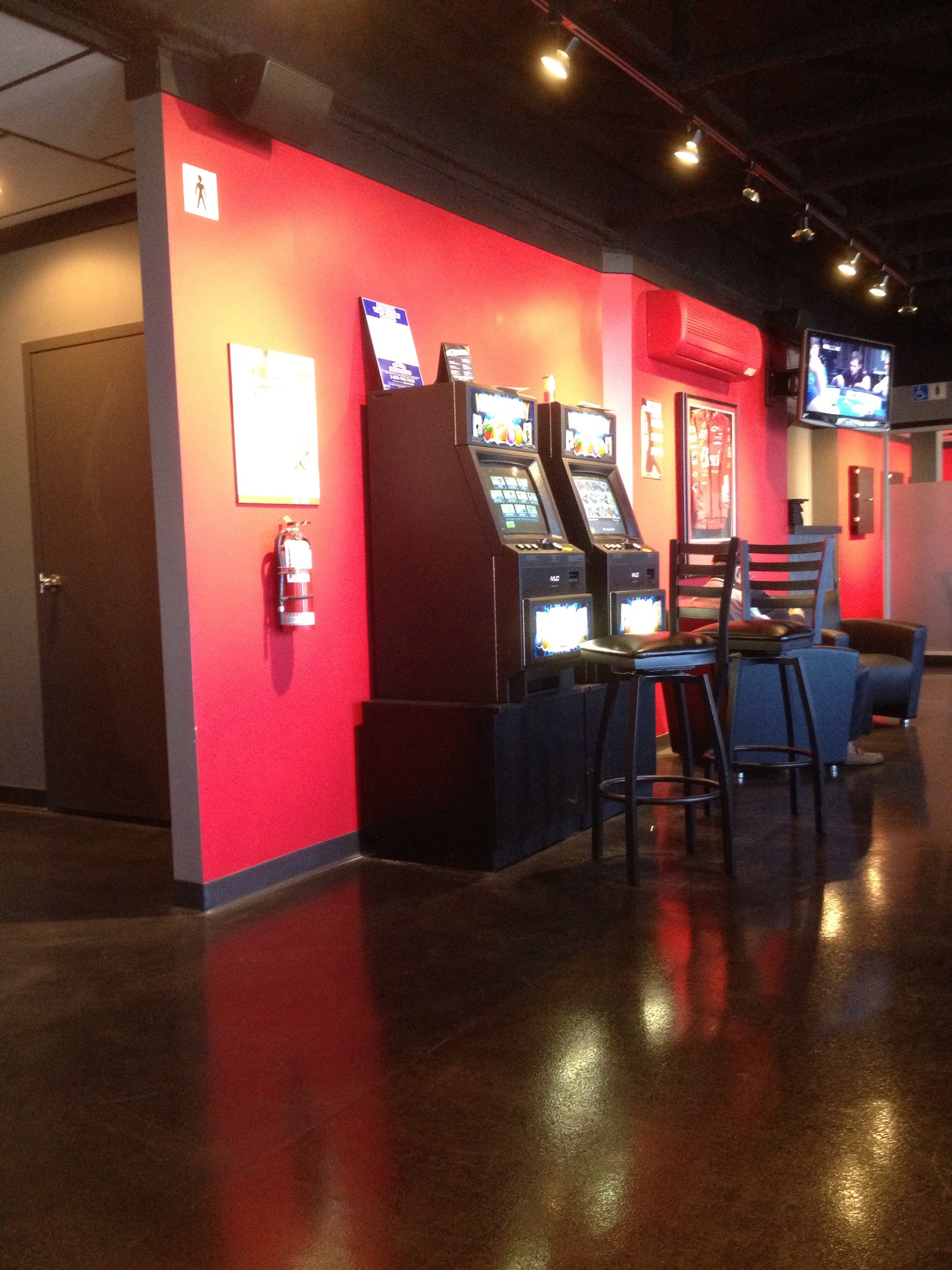
VLTs at a bar in Alberta.

VLT programs are operated in nine Canadian provinces, with the only major exception being British Columbia. These machines are typically governed by the region's lottery and gaming boards, and are situated inside licensed establishments such as bars. In several provinces, VLTs were deployed primarily to help counter illegal underground video gambling operations, while several (particularly those whose economies are reliant on natural resources) cited economic development as a factor in their use.

VLTs were first popularized in Atlantic Canada, with New Brunswick becoming the first province to introduce them in 1990, and the other Atlantic provinces following suit in 1991. In New Brunswick, sites were initially limited to a maximum of five machines each, and they were later removed from locations that did not hold liquor licenses. Since 2002, the Atlantic Lottery Corporation has been fully responsible for all VLT operations in the province, rather than having their costs covered by private owner-operators. The ALC had already operated the VLT programs in Newfoundland and Labrador and Nova Scotia since their launch, while Prince Edward Island transferred its VLTs to the ALC in 2003. Quebec introduced VLTs in 1994.

VLTs also began to appear in Western Canada in 1991, with Alberta trialling them during the Calgary Stampede and Klondike Days events before beginning a province-wide program the following year. Manitoba initially deployed them at rural locations only, but expanded them to Winnipeg in 1993, and the Assiniboia Downs race track. Saskatchewan introduced VLTs in 1993, primarily to encourage business at establishments in smaller communities (which faced competition from out-of-province casinos, prior to the opening of several commercial and First Nations casinos in the province). Saskatchewan's VLT program also includes games offering regional and province-wide "Vault Breaker" mystery progressive jackpots.

To address problem gambling concerns, VLTs in Canada are typically equipped with features and restrictions as safeguards in comparison to a casino-style slot machine, including the display of a player's credits as a cash value rather than units of a denomination, on-screen display of the current time, maximum session lengths with mandatory cash-out after time expires, limits on hours of operation, no Stop button (to regulate the pace of play), wager limits, limits on the amount of cash that can be deposited during a single session, and problem gambling resources. Some VLTs may also offer integrated account systems for tracking usage and setting limits on cash spent. In 2012, Nova Scotia began to mandate that users enroll in an account card system known as My-Play in order to use VLTs. The government discontinued the scheme in 2014, citing its decision to allow players to register anonymously without personal information ("light" enrollment) as having defeated the purpose of the system—as many players only used the cards temporarily before disposing them. The government claimed it would save $200,000 a year by removing the system.

Each province has imposed caps on the number of VLTs that may operate in their province, and Nova Scotia has enforced a moratorium on new VLT sites and attrition on existing sites outside of First Nations reservations (taking VLTs out of service permanently if a site closes or removes them). In the 2000s, Alberta reallocated some of its VLTs to increase the number allowed at specific sites, in effect reducing the total number of sites in operation. Some provinces also have regulations that allow individual municipalities to prohibit VLTs in their communities; ten Alberta communities opted out upon the establishment of its program, but some (such as Coaldale, Alberta) have since passed bylaws to lift the ban. In January 2017, Quebec announced that it would similarly re-allocate and cut its VLTs from 12,000 to under 10,000 over the next two years, including making the number of sites and machines present in a region proportional to population, and a focus on placing them in leisure venues such as billiard halls and bowling alleys to "promote socialization and group entertainment".

The Moncton, New Brunswick-based Spielo has been heavily involved in the Canadian VLT market; it was acquired in 2004 by GTECH Corporation, which was in turn acquired by Lottomatica of Italy, which then acquired and merged with IGT in 2015. Alberta and the Atlantic Lottery both deployed modernizations to their VLT networks in the early-2010s, entering into supply deals with multiple gaming vendors, collectively including Aristocrat, and the present IGT (IGT, Spielo) and Scientific Games (Bally Technologies and WMS, now Light & Wonder).

The Atlantic Lottery's VLT program has been subject to criticism, due to concerns from residents that the readily-accessible games exacerbate gambling addiction; in 2017, a class-action lawsuit against the ALC was certified in the Supreme Court of Newfoundland and Labrador, citing that the machines are "inherently deceptive, inherently addictive and inherently dangerous when used as intended", and were comparable to three-card monte—a con that is illegal under the Criminal Code. The plaintiffs sought damages equivalent to the ALC's alleged unlawful gains. In July 2020, the Supreme Court of Canada overturned a decision by the Court of Appeal of Newfoundland and Labrador that would have allowed the suit to move forward, ruling that the suit made insufficient arguments that VLTs were effectively equivalent to three-card monte.

== United States ==
Lotteries in the U.S. were considering VLTs as early as 1981, when a planned experiment with 20 machines by the New York State Lottery was scrapped, after the Attorney General determined they would be illegal. A similar plan by the New Jersey Lottery died in 1983 after ties between state officials and VLT manufacturers raised conflict of interest concerns.

The first VLTs in the country were installed in late 1983 by Bellevue, Nebraska as part of its municipal lottery. Eleven other local lotteries in Nebraska followed suit, until the state banned the devices, effective 1985.

South Dakota became on October 16, 1989, the first state to adopt VLTs. In a unique arrangement with private industry, the machines are owned by private companies but monitored by the South Dakota Lottery via a centralized computer system that assures the integrity of the games. South Dakota imposes a substantial tax on the net income (gross income minus player winnings) of the games. Beginning in 1992, four attempts were made to repeal South Dakota's video lottery; all were widely rejected by public votes. Most recently, in May 2006, petitions were filed containing over 21,000 signatures in order to place the issue on the November ballot; voters again agreed to keep video lottery, by a 66%-34% margin.

Other US jurisdictions which have had legal video lottery include: Oregon, Illinois, Rhode Island, Delaware, New York, Ohio, West Virginia, Louisiana, Maryland, Montana and formerly South Carolina. Of these, Delaware, Rhode Island and West Virginia previously participated in a multi-jurisdictional video lottery named Cashola.

The U.S. Virgin Islands also has a legalized video lottery, managed by Southland Gaming of the Virgin Islands. The local governments in St. Thomas and St. John use the funds generated by the video lottery to fund various government programs on the islands; primarily focusing on educational efforts.

=== Racinos ===
In 1990, West Virginia introduced the concept of racinos when it allowed MTR Gaming Group to add VLTs to Mountaineer Race Track & Gaming Resort in Chester.

Racinos differ from traditional VLTs in that all video lottery games are played on a gaming machine.

Other states that have legalized VLTs in racinos are Delaware, Rhode Island, Louisiana, New York, Ohio and West Virginia.

=== Non-lottery ===
In Montana, VLT-type poker, keno and bingo machines are legal to operate in the private sector. Since the 1970s, Montana was the first state, other than Nevada and New Jersey, to legalize machine gaming.

Keno and Bingo machines were first introduced in Montana in 1975. Although subject to legal challenge, these machines were deemed legal in 1976 after the Montana Supreme Court ruled in favor of Treasure State Games, a private company that brought the first games of this type to the state. (See Justia.com - Treasure State Games v. State of Montana)

Unlike in other states, the gaming devices are not under the jurisdiction of the state lottery. In 2011 the state legislature added another class of games, so-called "line games", to the list of approved games.

All establishments licensed for the on-premises consumption of alcohol within the state of Montana are allowed to operate such machines provided they have the correct permits. In addition, there are some Montana establishments (such as some truck stops) that do not possess "on-sale" licenses but hold "grandfather" licenses allowing them to operate gaming machines.

The maximum prize awarded on these machines is $800, with a maximum bet of $2 per hand. The legal age to gamble in Montana is 18, although people under the age of 21 cannot gamble in bars.

As in Louisiana, gaming machines in Montana operate outside the jurisdiction of the state lottery system.

=== Class III video lottery ===
Currently, only Oregon and South Dakota employ Class III gaming technology (incorporating a random number generator) into their VLT games. Oregon's VLT program was modeled upon those deployed in Canada. The devices operated in Montana are also Class III machines, but as they are not connected to the Montana Lottery are technically not "video lottery terminals". This means that unlike any of the Class II states (which have a fixed number of winners, analogous to scratch cards), Oregon and South Dakota lottery players compete against a house edge rather than other lottery players. This is the same type of gaming offered in Nevada, Connecticut and Atlantic City, New Jersey as well as in the majority of tribal casinos. Currently, the state of Oregon offers its players a 91-95% payout on each of its games. South Dakota and Montana law specifies that payouts must be greater than 80%, although in reality actual payouts in these two jurisdictions are around 88-92%.

Most US jurisdictions do not allow VLTs and those that do have attracted the same criticism the Canadian provinces have. However, some non-players have expressed tolerance for the machines.

== Other terminology ==
In certain jurisdictions, VLTs are known as video gaming devices (VGD) or video slot machines along with video gaming terminals (VGT). Most VLTs are multi-game devices, allowing the players to select, from an on-screen menu, the games they wish to play. They are also known as poker machines, video poker machines, and fruit machines in some areas.

== See also ==
- Fixed odds betting terminal
- Slot machine
- Video poker
