= Sisal (company) =

Italian gambling company

Sisal Group S.p.A.
- Company type: S.p.A.
- Industry: Gambling
- Founded: 1945; 81 years ago in Milan, Kingdom of Italy
- Founders: Massimo Della Pergola, Fabio Jegher, Geo Molo
- Headquarters: Milan, Italy
- Key people: Francesco Durante, CEO
- Services: Lottery; Gambling; Virtual races; Skill games; Online casino; Bingo; Gaming machines
- Owner: Flutter Entertainment (100%)
- Number of employees: 2,362 (2021)
- Parent: Flutter Entertainment
- Website: www.sisal.com

Sisal, acronym for Sport Italia Società a responsabilità limitata, active since 1946, is an Italian gambling company and payment service provider which has a network of around 35,000 payment terminals throughout the country.

== History ==
=== Origins ===
Sisal was founded in 1945 based on a concept by sports journalist Massimo Della Pergola who, together with journalist, writer and film producer Fabio Jegher and radio commentator Geo Molo, created the first football betting competition in Italy. Proceeds from the "Sisal schedina" contributed to the reconstruction of the stadiums destroyed by the war.

In 1948, the name of the coupon (schedina) was changed to Totocalcio and at the same time Totip, a horse racing competition, was launched. This was eventually discontinued in 2007 after almost 60 years. From 1983 to 1989, the Totip competition was associated with the Sanremo Festival, offering bettors the chance to vote on the final ranking of the song contest.

In 1991, Tris, simple horse race betting, became part of Sisal's betting shop services, while in 1996, the Italian Ministry of the Economy entrusted Sisal with the concession to manage the Enalotto lottery. In the following year, it became the SuperEnalotto and quickly established itself as the most popular game among Italians. 1997 also saw the launch of the gambling-themed satellite channel SisalTV.

=== Development in the gambling industry ===
In 2004, Sisal acquired the Matchpoint network, entering the betting market, and launched a dedicated website. The following year it also entered the market for gaming machines.

In 2009, it obtained the "Concessione Giochi Numerici a Totalizzatore Nazionale" (GNTN, Concession for National Totalisator Numerical Games), which enabled it to confirm the management of the SuperEnalotto and offered the opportunity to introduce new products to the market, the first of which was Vinci per la vita – Win for Life!, which offers an annuity for 20 years in each competition. In the following year, Sisal opened dedicated entertainment outlets called Sisal Wincity.

In 2011, Sisal launched SiVinceTutto, a lottery, which was updated in 2016 with changes in the draw frequency (from monthly to weekly) and choice of numbers (doubled from six to twelve).

In 2012, Sisal together with other European companies introduced Eurojackpot, a national totalisator game that allows to challenge other participating countries.

2014 saw the launch of VinciCasa, a game that offers a jackpot for the purchase of one or more properties, which was changed in 2017 with an increase in the draw frequency (from weekly to daily). NFC POS for electronic payments were also introduced in Sisal shops.

In 2016, the SuperEnalotto formula was revised, introducing two-number wins, instant wins, and a higher jackpot.

Since January 2019, Sisal has been managing lotteries in Morocco, after winning the tender to manage and develop games for the National Lottery Management Company (SGLN) in February of the previous year. It has also been present on the Spanish market since the same year, thanks to a licence obtained for online gaming, as well as in Turkey.

In 2019, Sisal also obtained the renewal of the concession for GNTN in the Italian market for another 9 years.

As of 2023 Sisal also manages various gambling subsidiaries including Tris, Totocalcio, Big Match, Sisal Poker, Sisal Bingo, Sisal Skill Games, Sisal Casino, and Sisal Quick Games.

In 2024, Sisal celebrated its 80th anniversary and received four awards at the EGR Italy Awards 2024, including "Operator of the Year" and "Safe Gaming Operator," confirming its market leadership for the fifth consecutive year thanks to its commitment to safe and responsible gaming strategies and continuous investment in innovation.

=== Payment services ===
In 2003, Sisal entered the payment services market, initially offering telephone top-ups through Sisal Centro Servizi.

Since 2011, with the authorisation of the Bank of Italy, it also started operating as a payment service provider. Through the SisalPay platform, launched the following year, it managed payment services for items such as bills and taxes, as well as telephone and prepaid credit card top-ups.

Since 2016, through an agreement with the Italian public administration, an option for citizens to pay for major public services (e.g. health tickets) through the network has also been added.

In September 2018, SisalPay also entered the digital payments market through Bill, an app that enables money transactions via smartphone in affiliated merchants and between users.

Following an agreement with Banca 5 of the Intesa Sanpaolo group, since November 2020 SisalPay is no longer part of Sisal and has renamed Mooney, creating the first operator in Italy for proximity payment services.

== Group companies ==
Since August 2022, Sisal has been part of Flutter Entertainment, a global online operator of sports betting, gaming and entertainment provider, listed on the London Stock Exchange (FTSE 100 Index).

=== The parent company ===
Sisal S.p.A. With a registered office in Milan, the company manage and coordinate other Group companies. It operates the national totalisator numerical games as a State concessionaire. Since December 2019, Francesco Durante has been the CEO of Sisal Spa.

=== Other operating companies ===
- Sisal Entertainment S.p.A. A single-shareholder company (until 12 December 2012 it was called Sisal Slot S.p.A. and later also took over Sisal MatchPoint S.p.A.), it manages the Sisal Matchpoint (since 2004) and Sisal Wincity (since 2010) points of sale. It operates in the betting, lottery and gaming machine sectors.
- Sisal Lottery Italia S.p.A.
- Sisal Lottery Ltd. (UK)
- Sisal Germany GmbH
- Sisal Albania SHPK
- Sisal Lotérie Maroc S.a.r.l.
- Sisal Technology (Turkey)
- Sisal Sans (Turkey)
