= Gambling in Nigeria =

Gambling in Nigeria is not well regulated. Although there is a gambling law in place, many illegal casinos operate in the country. The legal land-based casinos are located in the two largest cities. The biggest casino is The Federal Palace Hotel in Lagos. Nigerian law focuses on activities to reduce money laundering and illegal gambling.

== Gambling law ==
Gambling in Nigeria is regulated by the National Lottery Regulatory Commission and, for a long time, given the strong presence of the Catholic church in Nigerian civil society, it was discouraged and seen as an anti-social phenomenon. The lottery was legalized with the National Lottery Act, 2005 and gambling is defined by Chapter 22 of the Criminal Code Act enacted in 1990. The law splits the games into two categories: The legal and illegal games. The legal games are lottery, land-based casino, and sports betting. Roulette, dice games, and non-skilled card games are illegal. The law regulates slot machine activity and only licensed operators can provide slot machine gambling. Money laundering activity is covered by the Money Laundering (Prohibition) Act, 2011.

== Online gambling ==
Online gambling in Nigeria is regulated by the Nigerian Lottery Commission. All bookmakers are required to obtain a license from the gaming commission before operating in Nigeria. Nigerian law does not mention online space and there is no restriction for the people to reach local or foreign gambling sites. Although Internet space is not mentioned exactly in the law, the companies are obliged to follow the regulations and laws as it is for the land-based casinos. All types of online games are available except those that are illegal.

== Online gambling companies ==
Nigeria is one of the most competitive markets in gambling in Africa. The size of the population and internet exposure of the residents creates the right conditions for online gambling companies to operate in. Some of the legal bookmakers available online in Nigeria include Bet9ja, 1960bet, Nairabet, Betfair, 9jaPredict, Betway, BetNigeria and others.

=== Baba Ijebu ===
Premier Lotto Limited popularly called Baba Ijebu is a gaming company that offers lotto services and betting in Nigeria. It is the oldest known Nigerian lotto game operator and was registered in 2001. Baba Ijebu offers over 20 different lotto games which include Diamond, Peoples, Bingo, MSP, Metro, International, Gold, 06, Jackpot, Lucky G, Clubmaster, Super, Tota, Mark 2, Vag, Enugu, Midweek, Fairchance, Fortune, Royal, Bonanza, King, National, Lucky. Baba Ijebu was founded by gaming magnate Sir Kensington Adebukunola Adebutu CON, KJW, FISM who is also its current CEO. In 2017 also, Baba Ijebu signed Quadri Aruna on a three-year endorsement deal worth $75,000.

== Gambling age ==
The gambling age is defined by the law. People below the age of 18 cannot legally gamble.

== Payment gateways ==
There is no obstacle when depositing money to foreign or local bookies, although betting limits exist as defined by respective individual bookmakers. Users deposit money using bank cards, e-wallets such as Skrill or Neteller, and most recently USSD services. There is no legal restriction or service blocking.

== Youth and social impact ==
Research suggests that sports betting in Nigeria is especially popular among young adults, many of whom view it as both entertainment and a possible source of income. This has raised debates about its cultural and economic effects, as well as the potential risks of problem gambling.
