= Virtual racing =

Type of betting game in the UK

Virtual racing is an offering from the "Big Four" bookmakers in the United Kingdom, along with some smaller firms. They offer punters the opportunity to place a wager on racing even after the day's race coverage, then watch the race on a TV screen. The races include virtual dog racing and virtual horse racing.

Virtual Racing tracks include Portman Park, Steepledowns, Sprintvalley, Lucksin' Downs, Race Of Champions(exclusive to Ladbrokes), Hope Park, Canterbury Hills, Sandy Lanes and Home Straights (all four exclusive to William Hill) for the virtual horse enthusiast, whilst virtual greyhounds have tracks called Brushwood, Millersfield, Trapton Park and Mutleigh Cross amongst others.

== Odds ==
This opportunity to bet through does go with an edge to the house. Some betting shop punters have described these races as 'animal roulette' since the bookmaker knows exactly the chance of each dog winning. Some races have an overround (bookmakers margin) of 2% a runner, sometimes less in races with multiple runners. When these races can be as little as three minutes apart this results in unfavourable conditions for the gambler.

Virtual Racing is a visual representation of a computerised random number draw. The odds of the different horses (or dogs) are created by having the horses with the lower odds have more numbers in the draw than horses with higher odds. However, each number can only be drawn once and therefore the same selection cannot come first and second.

== Online virtual racing ==
With the growth of bookmakers' share of the online market, they also offer online virtual racing. These are often included in the 'games' section of the website. Other providers such as SkyBet, William Hill and Betfair let viewers watch it as an event. SkyBet has also used their parent company's position of a TV provider and used virtual racing to fill time slots on their Sky Vegas channel (Channel 845).

A new category of virtual racing games has also emerged since 2006 with Newturf.com and Horseracingpark.com, among a growing number of others. These are online multiplayer strategy games where people can breed, train, buy, sell and race virtual horses or dogs against each other with real money involved. These games simulate the management of a virtual stable or kennel based on pure logical mathematical equations (skill games). Each online horse or greyhound disposes of unique genetic information, which has a direct influence on its physical and mental potential.
