= Hrvatska Lutrija =

- Type: State-owned enterprise
- Industry: Gambling
- Founded: January 1, 1973; 53 years ago
- Headquarters: Zagreb, Croatia
- Products: Lottery, sports betting, casino games, slot machines
- Owner: Government of Croatia
- Website: www.lutrija.hr

Hrvatska Lutrija (English: Croatian Lottery) is the national lottery of Croatia. It began its work in 1973 with the passing of the Law on Games of Chance, which, in the territory of the then SR Croatia, establishes the establishment of a specialized organization for organizing games of chance called Lutrija Hrvatske.

== History ==
In 1951, was established as the Directorate for Croatia (Croatian: Direkcija za Hrvatsku), which was a part of the Yugoslav Lottery.

In 1973, it became an independent organization for the Croatian lottery, although remained part of the Business community of Yugoslav lotteries.

In 1993, two years after Croatia became an independent country, the lottery was renamed to Hrvatska Lutrija d.o.o.
