= Cashola =

US multi-jurisdictional video lottery game

Ca$hola
- Region: United States
- First draw: July 2006
- Highest jackpot: $4,918,605.91

Cashola, stylized Ca$hola, was a video lottery game offered by the Multi-State Lottery Association (MUSL) from July 2006 to May 2011. Cashola was the first US multi-jurisdictional video lottery game.

Cashola was played on linked machines at nine lottery-run casinos: three in Delaware, two in Rhode Island, and four in West Virginia. The minimum jackpot was $250,000; it was paid in 30 annual installments, unless the winner chose the cash option within 60 days of winning. The progressive jackpot exceeded $4 million (annuity) for the first time on November 4, 2009. The first 27 jackpot winners (unlike traditional lottery jackpot games, the grand prize could not be split by multiple players, as each Cashola machine was independent); as of February 2, 2009, all 27 chose the cash option. The largest Cashola jackpot, of $4,918,605.91, was won on November 26, 2009, in Charles Town, West Virginia.

To win the jackpot, the maximum amount of $2.25 must have been wagered for that spin. The themes for the Cashola slots varied by machine (e.g. Kingdom of Pharaohs, The Big Easy.) The minimum denomination also differed (there were penny, nickel, and quarter Cashola machines.) Each Cashola machine had five "reels"; for a jackpot to be won, in addition to the maximum wager, the gold-colored "Ca$hola" symbol must have appeared on each of the five "reels" in any of the lines the player "purchased" in that spin (the "Cashola" symbol appearing on each reel did not guarantee a jackpot win.)

Depending on the venue, the minimum age to play Cashola was 18 or 21.

In April 2011, it was announced that Cashola would be retired upon the next jackpot win, its 37th. Other Ca$hola machines then in use by players automatically shut down, issuing each player a voucher for credits in those machines.

Cashola was replaced by a new game called MegaHits. It started operating on July 15, 2011, in the same nine casinos, dividing its jackpot money among five progressive prizes.
