= Vikinglotto =

Multi-national lottery partnership

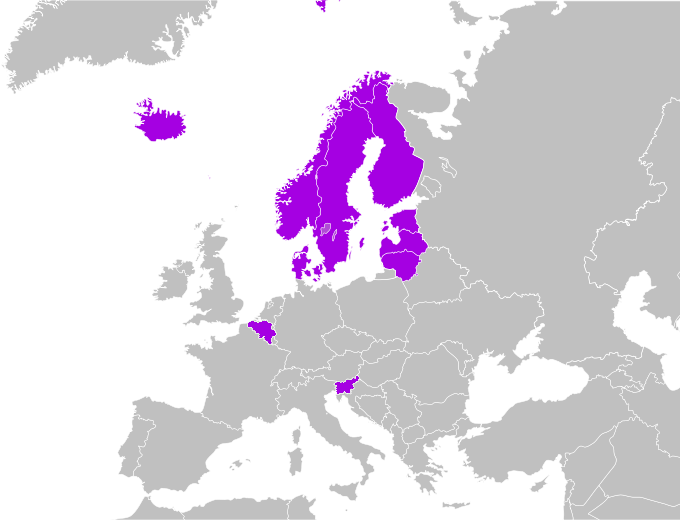
- Vikinglotto countries in Europe (2020)
- First draw: 17 March 1993

Vikinglotto (known in Denmark as Onsdags Lotto, "Wednesday Lotto", from February 2001 to May 2017, as Víkingalottó in Iceland, and formerly known in Lithuania as Vikingų Loto) is a partnership between the national lotteries of Norway, Sweden, Denmark, Iceland, Finland, Latvia, Lithuania, Estonia, Slovenia (in 2017) and Belgium (in 2020). Vikinglotto started on 17 March 1993 and was the first multi-national lottery in Europe.

== Tickets and draws ==
Draws are held at 20:00 CET every Wednesday evening, and they take place at Norsk Tipping in Hamar, Norway.

Tickets can be purchased online or from authorised retailers in each of the ten participating countries. The cost per combination varies in each member country, ranging from €1.00 (US$1.17) in Latvia to 90kr. (approximately €0.71) (US$.82) in Iceland, and up to €10.00 ($11.66) in Belgium.

== Play ==
For every line or combination a player enters into the draw, they must select six numbers, which can be any distinct integers from 1 to 48. Then, they must also pick one bonus number, known as the Viking number, from between 1 and 5 (previously 8).

In the past drawings, two bonus numbers and one special number were drawn, but these were replaced by the Viking number in May 2017.

During the draw, six main numbers are drawn from 1 - 48 and the additional Viking number is drawn from a separate pool of 1 - 5 (again previously 8). As the Viking number is drawn from a different pool, the same number could appear twice in a single draw - once as a main number and once as the Viking number.

== Prize structure ==
The Vikinglotto jackpot starts at €3 million (US$3.2 million, guaranteed to be at least 19 million DKK in Denmark) and can grow to a maximum of €25 million (US$26.6 million) (previously €35 million). The jackpot and the second prize are shared between all participating countries on a pari-mutuel basis, and all contribute to the prize fund for these two tiers. Smaller prizes are determined nationally, using the remaining funds from ticket sales. This arrangement differs from EuroMillions and Eurojackpot, where all prize categories are common to all participating countries.

== See also ==
- Lottery
