= National Lottery Regulatory Commission =

- Formation: 2005
- Purpose: Regulate lottery activities in Nigeria
- Headquarters: Abuja, Nigeria
- Official language: English
- Director-General: Lanre Gbajabiamila
- Affiliations: THE PRESIDENCY
- Staff: 1,600
- Website: http://www.nlrc-gov.ng

The National Lottery Regulatory Commission is the body that regulates lottery activities in Nigeria. The commission was established through the National Lottery Act of 2005. Lanre Gbajabiamila is the Director General of the Commission.

== See also ==
- List of Nigerian agencies
