= Burmese lottery =

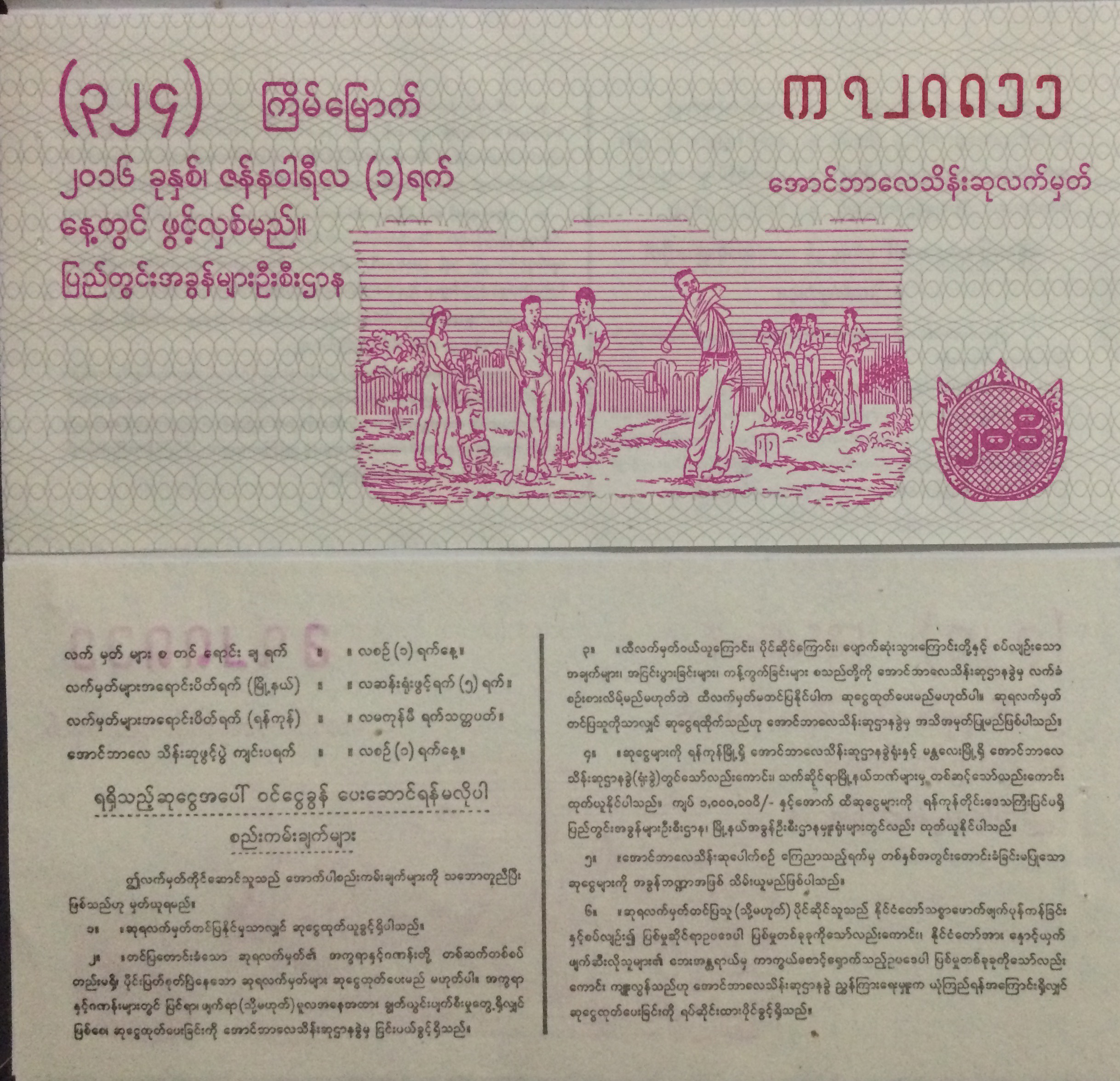
Myanmar lottery tickets showing front and back sides.

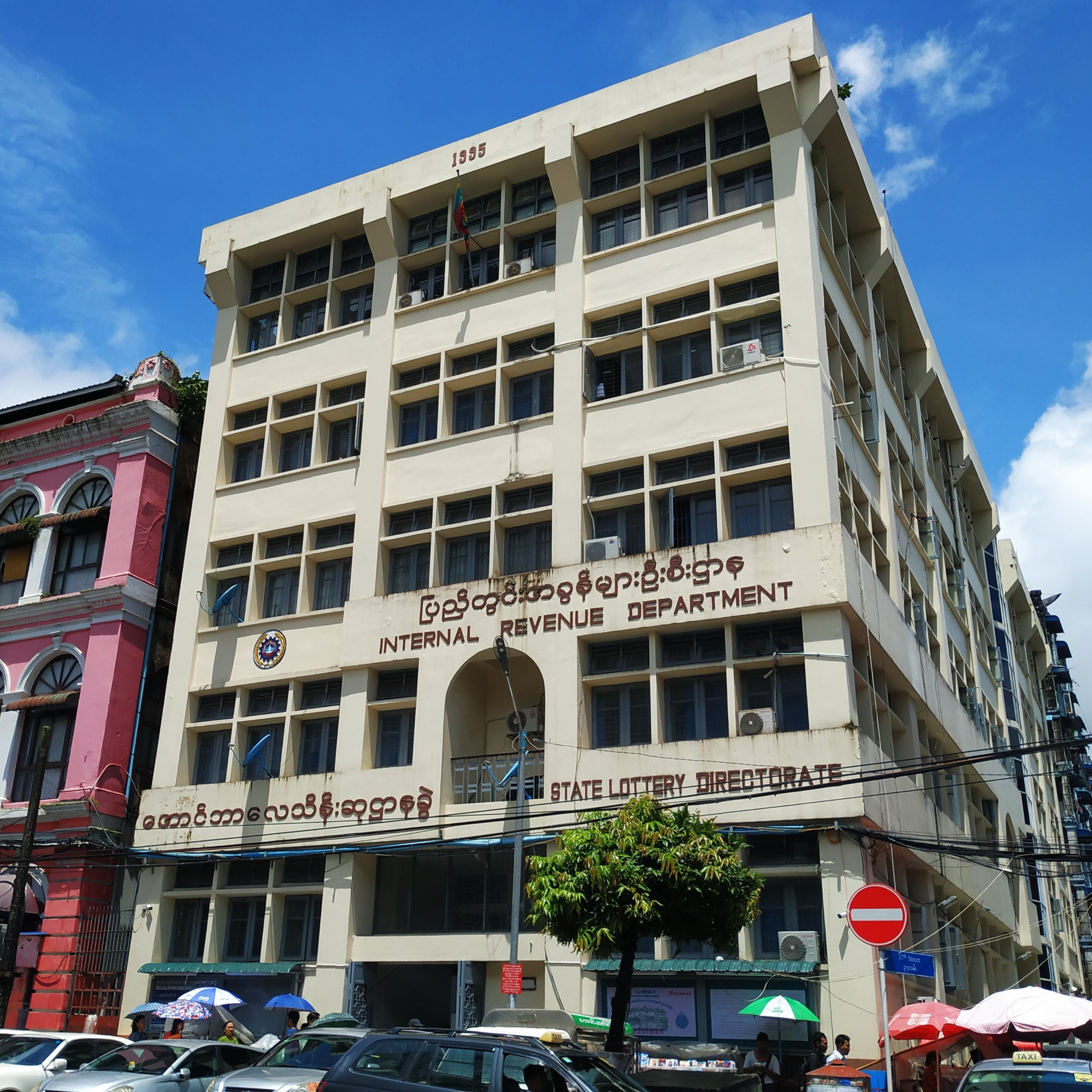
State Lottery Directorate

Aungbazay (Burmese: အောင်ဘာစေ; also spelt Aung Bar Zay, lit. "may you win") is Myanmar's official state lottery. The monthly lottery is administered by the Ministry of Finance's State Lottery Department. Lottery tickets are printed at a printing plant in Wazi, Magwe Region, at the same location where Burmese kyat notes and passports are printed.

The first Burmese lottery was introduced during the Konbaung Dynasty. A national state lottery was first established in 1878 during the reign of King Thibaw Min, in an attempt to raise state revenues. The lottery was the brainchild of Pho Hlaing, who had played the French lottery in Paris. Following ongoing issues with the administration of the lottery, including conflicts of interest, decreased revenues, condemnation against gambling by Buddhist monks, the lottery was ended in 1880.

The current lottery was first introduced in 1938 under British rule, and is the only legal form of gambling in the country. Revenues from lottery ticket sales generates US$28.8 million per year for the Burmese government, and over 30 million tickets are sold a month for the monthly drawing.
