= Ethiopian National Lottery Administration =

Ethiopian government agency

- የኢትዮጵያ የብሔራዊ ሎተሪ አስተዳደር

Agency overview
- Formed: 8 September 1961
- Jurisdiction: Ethiopia
- Headquarters: Arada subcity, Addis Ababa, Ethiopia; 9.0307°N 38.7547°E
- Agency executive: Desse Dejene, Director
- Parent department: Ministry of Finance and Economic Development
- Website: www.ethiolottery.et/am

The Ethiopian National Lottery Administration (Amharic: የኢትዮጵያ የብሔራዊ ሎተሪ አስተዳደር) is an Ethiopian government agency responsible for the management of lottery games in Ethiopia. Established in 1961, it is under the Ministry of Finance and Economic Development oversight.

== History ==
The Ethiopian National Lottery Administration was established on 8 September 1961 by Proclamation no 183 as the first autonomous agency. Under the aegis of the Ministry of Finance and Economic Development, the agency manages and organizes lottery games in Ethiopia.

In 2007, under FDRE Proclamation No. 535/2007, the administration and the National Lottery Services (NLS) reestablished under Councils of Ministers Regulation No. 160/2009. They are the governing body of gaming in Ethiopia.
