= Caribbean Lottery =

Multi-national lottery

The Caribbean Lottery is a multi national lottery covering the countries and territories of the United States Virgin Islands, Saint Kitts and Nevis, Antigua and Barbuda, Anguilla and Sint Maarten. The lottery is operated by International Game Technology

The main game is Super Lotto which is played across all Caribbean Lottery jurisdictions as well as Jamaica and Barbados. Other games include Lucky Pick, Express Cash, Pick 3, Pick 4 and Caribbean Numbers. The Super Lotto started in 2009.
