= Rhode Island Lottery =

State lottery for Rhode Island

The Lot logo

The Rhode Island Lottery (Also known as The Lot informally and as "Your Rhode Island Lottery" in marketing materials) is run by the government of Rhode Island. The modern form of the Rhode Island Lottery was inaugurated in 1974, following a constitutional amendment passed in 1973. It is a charter member of the Multi-State Lottery Association (MUSL). Rhode Island Lottery games include Mega Millions, Powerball, Wild Money, Keno, and scratch tickets. The Rhode Island Lottery also offers online lottery games and oversees and regulates video lottery as well as sports betting.

The minimum age to play the Rhode Island Lottery is 18.

== History ==
Lotteries played an important role in Rhode Island from the colonial period until the mid-19th Century. They were banned by the colonial legislature in 1732, only to be brought back in 1744. They continued, generally under control of the Rhode Island General Assembly, until being banned again in 1842. The lottery was reintroduced in 1974, as Rhode Island joined several states, including New Hampshire, New York, and New Jersey, in introducing state lotteries. It is a charter member of the Multi-State Lottery Association

In June 2018, Rhode Island Governor Gina Raimondo signed legislation permitting sports betting within the state, which is currently overseen and regulated by the Rhode Island Lottery, and run by William Hill.

As a response to the COVID-19 pandemic, the Rhode Island Lottery began offering eInstant games (Similar to instant tickets but played entirely online on a computer or mobile device) and Keno as part of a new iLottery service in May 2020, which can be accessed from any mobile device or computer physically located within the state of Rhode Island.

== Current draw games ==
=== In-house draw games ===
==== The Numbers ====
This was launched in 1976 and was the first Rhode Island Lottery game where players could select their numbers. Nightly, four sets of balls numbered 0 through 9 are drawn; this was three sets of balls between 1976 and 1978. Prizes and options vary. Rhode Island, unusually, does not draw a three-digit number separately; however, players can choose "first three" or "last three". "Midday" drawings for The Numbers were added in 2014.

==== Wild Money ====
Wild Money is drawn 7 days a week (previously was on Tuesdays, Thursdays and Saturdays only before July 2020). It draws 5 balls numbered 1-38 (previously was 35 before July 2020), with an "Extra Ball" drawn from the remaining 33. The "Extra Ball" is used to determine some of the prizes, but not the jackpot, which starts at $20,000. Games are $1. Players win with at least one "main" number, plus the Extra Ball, or at least 2 "main" numbers, without or with the Extra Ball. Prizes ranging from $1 to the Jackpot.

==== Keno ====
Drawings are 4 minutes apart during Keno hours. Prizes vary depending on the initial wager amount and the number of numbers played. There are two separate additional options for Keno in Rhode Island; Keno Plus offers a possible multiplier between 2x and 10x and Keno Overtime draws 10 additional numbers after the 20 in standard Keno with bonus prizes, both cost double the standard Keno wager and can be combined. Keno is played at all retailers, although some retailers are equipped with a special monitor. Keno has been available on all mobile devices and computers located within the state of Rhode Island since 2020; between 2016 and 2020 Keno could be bought on mobile devices with a special app at specific retailers.

==== Bingo ====
Bingo launched in 2012 with drawings take place every 8 minutes. Retailers are equipped with a monitor displaying the drawings. 30 numbers are drawn. Players must match the called numbers to their numbers on the display to create Bingo patterns. The object is to match one of the Rhode Island Lottery Bingo patterns (One line, two lines, three lines, four or more lines, four corners, an "X", a "Y", or a "Diamond", the latter of which awards $10,000 on a $1 bet and $100,000 on a $10 bet). Bingo is sold at all retailers, although only some have a monitor to show drawings.

=== Multi-jurisdictional games ===
==== Mega Millions ====
Rhode Island joined Mega Millions on January 31, 2010; it was part of the cross-sell expansion that took place on that date. (Most U.S. lotteries with either Mega Millions or Powerball joined the other on that date; the agreement was finalized on October 13, 2009.)

Mega Millions is drawn Tuesdays and Fridays; its starting jackpot is $40 million. Games are $2 each, or $3 if the "Megaplier" multiplier is activated.

==== Powerball ====
Rhode Island was among the seven founding members of MUSL, formed in 1987. Its best-known game, Powerball, began in 1992. Games are $2 each; a PowerPlay game is $3. The "PowerPlay" option began in 2001. Jackpots start at $40 million; it is drawn Mondays Wednesdays and Saturdays.

Powerball has undergone several format changes. The first was in 1997, which introduced its cash option. Its current format began in 2015. Power Play winnings again are determined by a random multiplier.

Rhode Island's largest lottery prize was $336,400,000 (annuity value) for the February 11, 2012 drawing; the cash option was chosen.

==== Lucky For Life ====
In 2009, the Connecticut Lottery began an in-state game called Lucky4Life. It was replaced three years later by a regional game with a modified name: Lucky for Life (LFL), adding Maine, Massachusetts, New Hampshire, Vermont, and Rhode Island.

The current LFL, which began on January 27, 2015, costs $2 per play. Players pick 5 of 48 white balls, and 1 of 18 green "Lucky Balls." First and second prizes are "lifetime" annuities: $1,000 per day for a perfect match (5+1), or $25,000 per year for a 5+0 match. A winner of either lifetime annuity can choose cash instead of the periodic payments.

On January 27, 2015, LFL became a "quasi-national game"; as of June 2021, it is offered in 22 states and the District of Columbia.

== Former draw games ==
=== In-house draw games ===
==== 4/40 Jackpot and 4/47 Jackpot ====
4/40 Jackpot was the Rhode Island Lottery's first terminal-based jackpot game, which began in 1981. As the name suggested, it used a pick-4-of-40 number matrix, with "just the jackpot" tickets being offered for $1 each; a $2 "insurance" option allowed a ticket to qualify for smaller prizes should it match 2 or 3 of the 4 drawn numbers. In 1983, the draw matrix became pick-4-of-47, and as such it became 4/47 Jackpot. This was replaced the next year by Lot-O-Bucks.

==== Chance of a Lifetime Game ====
Run in May 1975 as the Lottery's second ever draw game, this game combined four separate games onto one ticket. These games were the "Action Plan", which offered $20 if a three-digit number was hit, the "Grand Plan", which offered $1,000 if a five-digit number was hit, the "Pension Plan", which offered $100, $200, $300 or $500 a month for life if a six-digit number was hit, and the "Jackpot Plan", which offered $10,000, $5,000 or $2,000 if a six-digit number was hit. Each ticket contained 8 numbers each for the Action and Grand Plans and 4 numbers each for the Pension and Jackpot Plans for a total of 24 numbers. Each ticket cost $1.

==== Easy Win ====
Easy Win was launched in 2000 to replace Roll Down. Like the game it replaced, this had a pick-4-of-50 number matrix, but didn't have a roll-down feature for its $25,000 top prize. This game didn't even get through 2000 and was replaced by Money Roll, which brought back the roll-down feature albeit with a smaller number matrix.

==== Hot Trax ====
Hot Trax was the Rhode Island Lottery's second monitor game after Keno and launched in 2004. Played every 4 minutes, each game focused on an auto race which lasted 60 seconds, after which each car's finishing position would be listed, which offered multiple ways to win depending on the options used. Hot Trax was discontinued in 2006.

==== Lot-O-Bucks ====
Lot-O-Bucks launched in 1984 to replace 4/47 Jackpot and ended in 1995 to be replaced by Rhody Cash. Lot-O-Bucks used several different number matrixes, most recently a pick-5-of-40.

==== Rhody Cash ====
Rhody Cash launched in 1995 and replaced Lot-O-Bucks. This game had a pick-5-of-30 number matrix and offered a $25,000 top prize if all 5 numbers matched. Just one year later, this game would be discontinued for the multi-state Daily Millions offered by MUSL.

==== Rhody Poker ====
Rhody Poker launched in 2006 to replace Hot Trax as the Rhode Island Lottery's secondary monitor offering and cost $2 a "hand". Played every 4 minutes, a player would have to face three other virtual opponents in a game of poker with two quick-pick hands, with the player having to beat all 3 opponents with at least one of the hands to win a prize. Rhody Poker was discontinued in 2008.

==== Roll Down/Money Roll ====
Roll Down launched in 1998 to replace MUSL's national Daily Millions game as an in-state offering. This game had a pick-4-of-50 number matrix with a jackpot, however like Cash Winfall in Michigan and neighboring Massachusetts it had a roll-down feature, hence its name; when the jackpot wasn't hit at all (Instead of when a certain cash amount is reached like in both versions of Cash Winfall), the jackpot would be distributed evenly among those who only hit 3 out of 4 numbers. This was replaced in 2000 by Easy Win but returned that same year under a different guise known as Money Roll, however this had a pick-4-of-39 matrix and was replaced in 2002 by Wild Money.

==== The Grand Lot ====
Run in June 1975 after the Chance of a Lifetime Game, The Grand Lot combined six games onto a single ticket: A three digit number game for $20, a four digit number game for $50, a five digit number game for $500 and three six digit number games - One for $5,000, one for $1,000 a month for a year and a "Super Drawing", which offered $4,000, $6,000, $8,000, $10,000, $15,000 and the top prize of $1,000 for life. Each ticket contained four numbers for the $20, $50, $500 and Super Drawing games and two numbers for the $5,000 and $1,000 a month for a year games for a total of 20 games. Like with the Chance of a Lifetime Game, tickets cost $1.

==== The Lot ====
The Lot, the name of which is still informally used as a name for the Rhode Island Lottery, was launched in 1974 when the Lottery was first established. Like most early lotteries, The Lot was offered weekly with each ticket containing a string of numbers which had to be matched at least somewhat to win prizes. The prize for matching all numbers in the string was $50,000. The Lot cost 50 cents to play.

=== Multi-jurisdictional games ===
==== Cashola ====
The first MUSL video lottery progressive, Cashola, began in July 2006; it ended when its 37th jackpot was won, on May 15, 2011. Cashola's jackpot was its only progressive level. It would be replaced by MegaHits that same year.

==== Daily Millions ====
The Rhode Island Lottery offered Daily Millions, MUSL's secondary jackpot game to Powerball, in 1996 to replace the in-state Rhody Cash. As its name implies, draws occurred daily instead of the standard 2 or 3 times a week, with a top prize of $1 million should they match all six winning numbers from three separate pick-2-of-22 number matrixes (Numbers in each matrix were marked from 0 to 21). This game was discontinued in 1998 to be replaced by the in-state Roll Down game.

==== Lotto America ====
The Rhode Island Lottery joined MUSL as a founding member in 1987 and offered Lotto America, MUSL's first jackpot game, the next year. Lotto America would be replaced by Powerball in 1992.

==== MegaHits (video lottery) ====
Rhode Island's two lottery-run casinos (Twin River in Lincoln and Newport Grand in Newport) offered MegaHits, MUSL's second video lottery terminal (VLT) progressive jackpot game. MegaHits began in 2011; it replaced Cashola. (Delaware, Maryland, Ohio, and West Virginia also offered MegaHits.) MegaHits featured five jackpots; the top progressive's minimum was $100,000. All MegaHits jackpots were paid in cash. The maximum wager must have been made in order to be eligible for any of the progressives. (All MegaHits wagers fed the top progressive level; however, the other progressives were fed by MegaHits wagers within that lottery's jurisdiction.) MegaHits ended on July 31, 2018.

== Instant games ==
The Rhode Island Lottery has been selling instant games since 1976. Currently it offers games with price points of $1, $2, $3 (Usually Bingo and Loteria games), $5, $10, $20, $25, $30 and $50 with prizes between $500 and $2 million; a $7 ticket was previously offered by the Lottery.

Starting in 2016, the Rhode Island Lottery began selling eInstant games, similar to the instant games offered by the Lottery although they are played online via a computer or mobile device located physically within the state. These games are offered with price points of $1, $2, $3, $5, $10 and $20, with prizes ranging from $500 to $200,000 depending on the game played and price point selected.

== Claiming prizes ==
Like other lotteries within the United States, winning tickets with prizes at or below $600 can be claimed at any Rhode Island Lottery retailer. However, winning tickets with prizes from $601 onwards have to be claimed at the Rhode Island Lottery headquarters in Cranston, Rhode Island.
