= SuperEnalotto =

Italian lottery

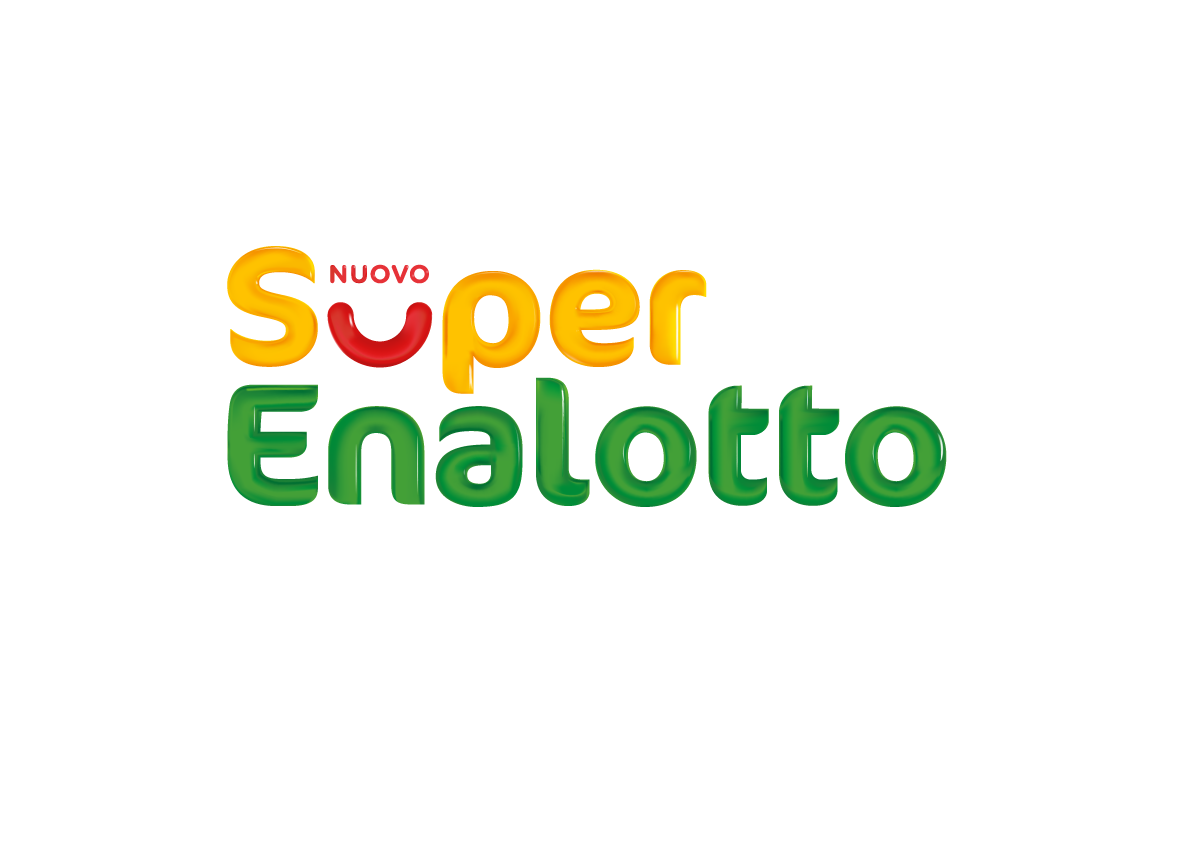
The SuperEnalotto logo.

SuperEnalotto is an Italian lottery played since 3 December 1997. Draws are held on Tuesdays, Thursdays, Fridays and Saturdays at 8:00 PM. Its jackpots are among the largest in the world, while the odds of winning them are among the longest.

== History ==
SuperEnalotto replaced the older Enalotto in 1997. It was devised by Rodolfo Molo and is managed by Sisal, which has been part of Flutter Entertainment since August 2022.

Until 30 June 2009, the six main numbers were taken from the first number drawn in Lottomatica's regional Lotto draws for Bari, Florence, Milan, Naples, Palermo and Rome (used in that order), with the Venice draw providing the "Jolly" number. If a city's first number had already been used, its second number was taken, and so on. Under this system, two cities could occasionally produce the same number, which made the jackpot impossible to win.

== Playing the game ==
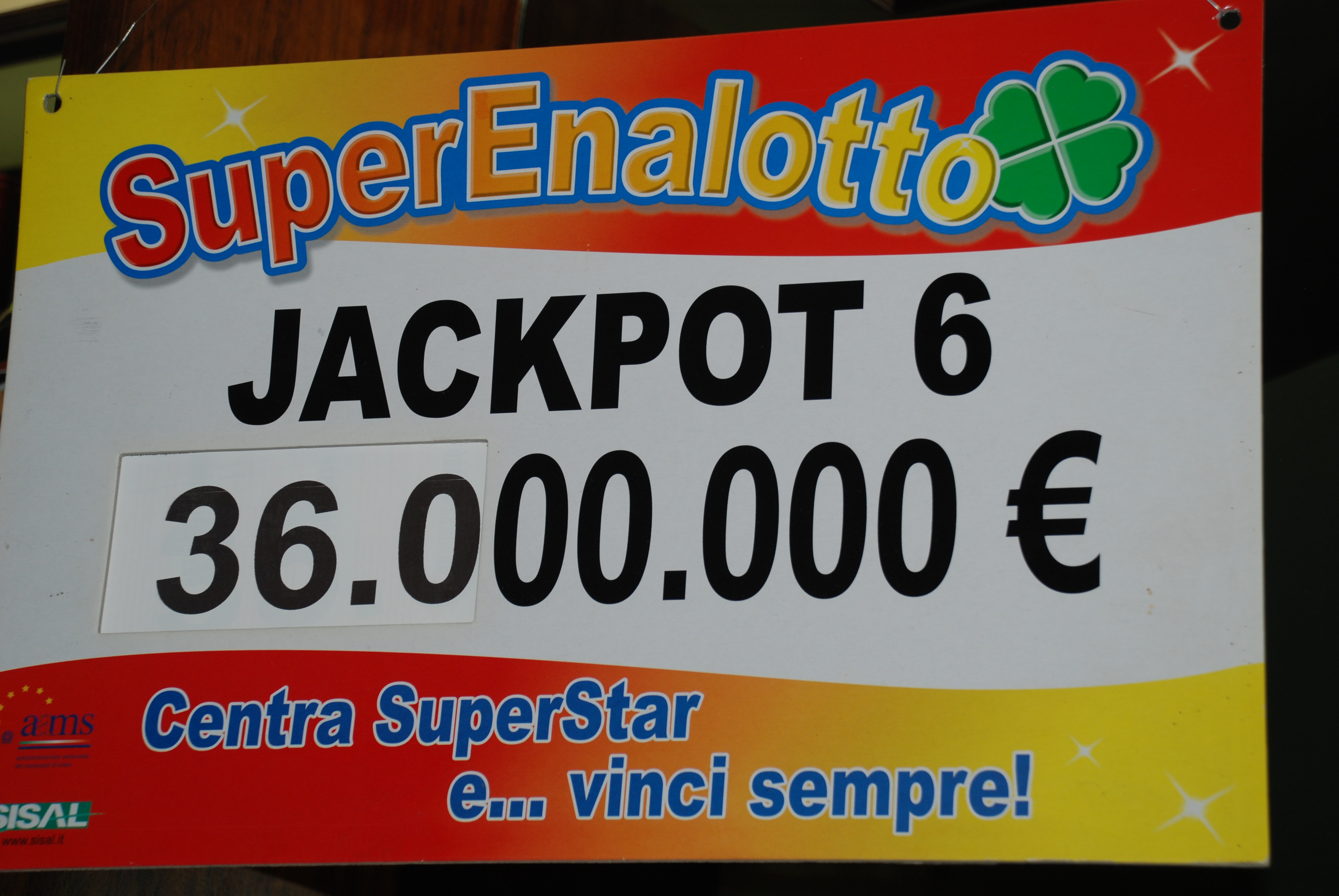
Advertising for a €36,000,000 jackpot, seen in July 2008

Since 2 February 2016, a SuperEnalotto line has cost one euro; before then it cost 50 cents. The optional "SuperStar" number costs an extra 50 cents per line.

To win the jackpot, a player must match six numbers out of 90. There are also prizes for matching two, three, four or five numbers, and for five numbers plus the "Jolly" number (5+1). The odds for each category are:

Match	Odds
6	1 in 622,614,630
5+Jolly	1 in 103,769,105
5	1 in 1,250,230
4	1 in 11,907
3	1 in 327
2	1 in 22

=== SuperStar ===
The SuperStar is an additional number. Under the old rules it was taken from the National Lotto draw in Rome (Ruota Nazionale); under the current rules it is drawn separately from the six main numbers and the Jolly, so it may coincide with one of them. Matching it can multiply prizes up to 100-fold, or pay a fixed amount even if none of the six main numbers is matched.

SuperStar payout table
Match	Payout
6	€2,000,000 (SuperBonus)
5+Jolly	€1,000,000 (SuperBonus)
5	25 times match 5 prize money
4	100 times match 4 prize money
3	100 times match 3 prize money
2	€100
1	€10
0	€5

=== Prizes and taxation ===
Jackpots have no cap and roll over to the next draw until they are won. The prize pool consists of 60% of sales. Winnings up to €500 are tax-free. On the excess over €500, a 20% tax applied until 2024; since 2025 the rate has ranged from 15% to 25% depending on the amount won.

When the game began, the minimum stake (for two lines) was 1,600 Italian lire, rising to 1,900 lire by the time the euro was introduced in 2002. One euro is equivalent to 1,936.27 lire.

== Biggest payoff ==
The largest jackpot ever won is €371,133,424.51, split among 90 winners on 16 February 2023. The largest single-winner jackpot, and the second largest overall, is €209,160,441.54, hit on 13 August 2019 with a ticket sold at a bar in Lodi.
