= EuroMillions =

Lottery

- Participating territories: Andorra; Austria (2004–); Belgium (2004–); France and Overseas France (2004–); Ireland (2004–); Isle of Man (2004–); Liechtenstein; Luxembourg (2004–); Monaco; Portugal (2004–); Spain (2004–); Switzerland (2004–); United Kingdom (2004–)
- First draw: 13 February 2004
- Operator: Française des Jeux, Loterías y Apuestas del Estado, Allwyn UK.
- Website: euromillions.eu

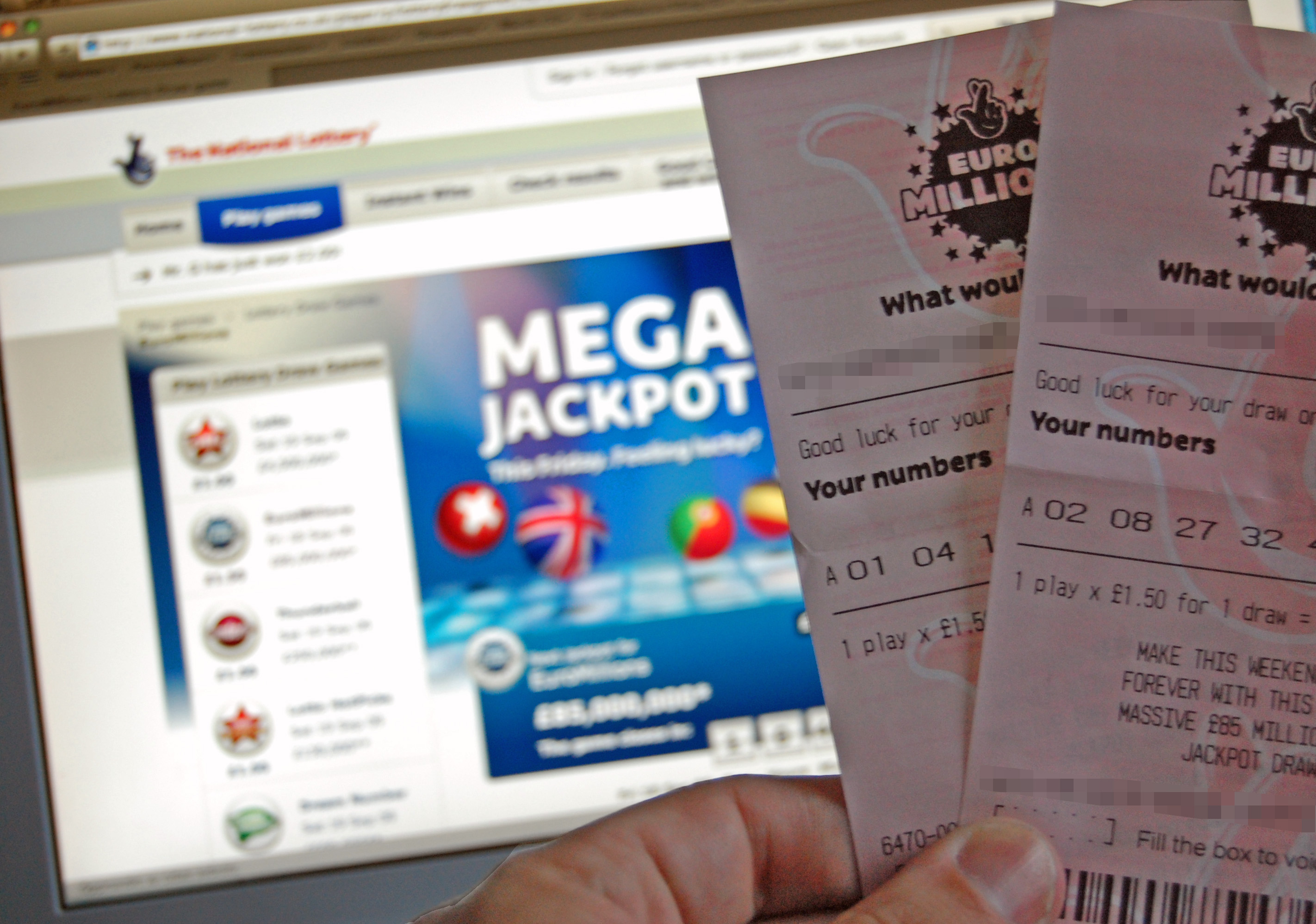
EuroMillions tickets and website (2009)

EuroMillions (Note: Spanish: Euromillones; Austrian German: Euromillionen or EuroMillionen; Portuguese: Euromilhões) is a transnational lottery that requires seven correct numbers to win the jackpot, which consists of 5 main numbers and 2 Lucky Star Numbers. It was launched on 7 February 2004 by France's Française des Jeux, Spain's Loterías y Apuestas del Estado and the United Kingdom's Camelot group (now part of Allwyn). The first draw was held on 13 February 2004 in Paris. Initially, only the UK, France and Spain participated, with the Austrian, Belgian, Irish, Luxembourgian, Portuguese and Swiss lotteries joining for the 8 October 2004 draw.

Draws are held every Tuesday and Friday night at approximately 21:05 GMT +1 in Paris. A standard EuroMillions ticket costs €2.50, £2.50 or CHF 3.50 per line played. The draw machines are manufactured by French manufacturer Ryo Catteau, with the main number machine using their Stresa model, whilst the Lucky Star Number machine uses their Pâquerette model.

Ireland has an exclusive option called Plus, which adds €1.00 per line. As of February 2014, a non-optional addition called "My Million" in France adds €0.50 per line, while in Portugal it is called "M1lhão" and represents €0.30 of the whole €2.50 bet.

The cost of playing in the UK increased from £1.50 to £2.00 per line on 7 November 2009, due to the EUR/GBP exchange rate and automatic entry into its Millionaire Raffle. On 24 September 2016, the cost per line increased from £2.00 to £2.50 in the UK. On the same day, in Ireland and Spain it rose to €2.50 per line.

From 24 September 2016, the number of lucky stars changed from a pool of 11 to a pool of 12 numbers, decreasing the jackpot-winning odds from 1:117million to 1:140million. All prizes, including the jackpot, are tax-free (except in Switzerland, Spain and Portugal, since 2013) and are paid as a lump sum.

== Play ==
- The player selects five main numbers which can be any number from 1 to 50.
- The player selects two different lucky star numbers from a pool of 12 numbers.

Draws take place at approximately 21:05 CET every Tuesday and Friday in Paris. The results are published shortly after the draw on associated and independent websites around 21:50 CET.

To participate in the EuroMillions Lotto, tickets can be purchased from many outlets, namely at licensed stores and online websites. The gameplay changed on Tuesday, 10 May 2011 with a second weekly draw and the number of "lucky stars" in the Pâquerette machine increasing from 9 to 11. A prize for matching two main numbers and no lucky stars was also introduced on the same date. On Friday, 23 September 2016, the number of "lucky stars" increased again, from 11 to 12.

== Eligibility ==
The game is offered by 10 lottery operators in 9 countries:

- Austria: Österreichische Lotterien GmbH
- Belgium: National Lottery of Belgium
- France: La Française des Jeux
- Ireland: Premier Lotteries Ireland DAC
- Luxembourg: Loterie Nationale
- Portugal: Jogos Santa Casa
- Spain: Loterías y Apuestas del Estado
- Switzerland:
  - Société de la Loterie de la Suisse Romande
  - Swisslos Interkantonale Landeslotterie
- United Kingdom: Allwyn UK

Through the authorities of the above operators, the game is also available to players in Andorra, Liechtenstein, and Monaco, as well as the Isle of Man and French overseas regions and collectivities.

Entrants must be at least 18 years old. There is no restriction on the nationality of buyers; non-residents are eligible to participate as long as they meet the age requirement.

== Prize structure ==
The prize structure as of Tuesday, 4 February 2020 is as follows:

Main numbers	Lucky stars	Probability of winning (a)		% of prize fund (b)	Expected winnings (c)	
Main numbers	Lucky stars	Fraction	%	% of prize fund (b)	(€)	(£)
2	0	1 in 22	4.57%	16.59%	€4	£3
2	1	1 in 49	2.03%	10.3%	€6	£5
1	2	1 in 188	0.53%	3.27%	€7	£6
3	0	1 in 314	0.32%	2.7%	€9	£8
3	1	1 in 706	0.14%	1.45%	€11	£9
2	2	1 in 985	0.10%	1.3%	€14	£12
4	0	1 in 13,811	0.0072%	0.26%	€39	£33
3	2	1 in 14,125	0.0071%	0.37%	€57	£48
4	1	1 in 31,075	0.0032%	0.35%	€120	£101
4	2	1 in 621,503	0.00016%	0.19%	€1,299	£1,094
5	0	1 in 3,107,515	0.000032%	0.61%	€20,851	£17,555
5	1	1 in 6,991,908	0.000014%	2.61%	€200,738	£169,001
5	2	1 in 139,838,160	0.00000072%	50% or 42% (X)	Jackpot	
Prize Guarantee Fund				10% or 18% (X)		
Overall		1 in 13	7.71%	100%	€14	£12

The Prize Guarantee Fund is available to contribute to the jackpot, for example, to boost the initial jackpot in a sequence of growing jackpots. The amount utilized each week is determined in advance by the participating lotteries.

- (a) per entry
- (b) prize fund = 50% of sales main draw
- (b) sales main draw = €2.20 in pounds sterling per entry (exchange rate!) times number of entries
- (X) draw 1 to 5: 50% + 10% & draw 6 (or higher): 42% + 18%
- (c) expected winnings are based on the currency exchange rate as at 7 December 2019, 1 euro = 0.8419 pound, rounded to 1 pound
- The odds of winning any prize at all are 1 in 13
- The odds of getting none of the 50 main balls but getting both lucky stars is approximately 1 in 115. This means that it is less likely than getting 2 main balls and one lucky star (1 in 49). However, there is no prize for only getting 2 lucky stars.
- The figures for the estimated prize are just a guide, and the actual amount varies according to the total in the prize fund and the number of winners for each prize. (Estimated prizes as per reverse of UK payslip)
- If the Jackpot is not won, it rolls over to the next draw.

Effective 7 November 2009 new rules were put in place regarding rollovers:

- The new rules introduced a Jackpot Pool Cap. Once the jackpot reached €185,000,000, the Jackpot will remain at €185,000,000 and any additional prize money rolled over would be added to the jackpot pool for the next lower prize level containing at least one winner (5 main numbers + 1 Lucky Star or possibly even just five main numbers).
- After the capped jackpot is reached, either won or rolled down, the next capped jackpot cap would increase by £5million.

A new rule change of 12 January 2012 locked the Jackpot cap at €190,000,000 permanently and if the jackpot was not won after two draws, the prize money would be distributed among the winners at the next level. A new rule change of 24 September 2016 stated that if the jackpot is not won five draws after it reaches €190,000,000, the prize money will be distributed among the winners at the next level. The minimum jackpot prize increased from €15,000,000 to €17,000,000.

In February 2020, the rules regarding the EuroMillions jackpot changed again. The new cap was set at €200,000,000, but that would no longer be fixed. If the jackpot gets to this amount, the cycle can last for five draws. If there are no winners in the fifth draw, the jackpot is paid out to the lower tier. For the next cycle, the maximum jackpot is set to €210,000,000, and is again paid out to the lower tier if there is no winner. In subsequent cycles, the maximum jackpot is raised to 220, 230, 240 and finally 250 million euros. The latest maximum jackpot, €250m, was reached on 13 June 2025.

== EuroMillions Trust ==
The participating national lotteries in the EuroMillions game have each established a EuroMillions Trust account. This is used for the settlement of all amounts due, and for holding amounts in respect of future prizes. This trust arrangement protects the participating lotteries between them from a default from one of the national companies, and ultimately the players' interests.

== Super Draws and Event Draws ==
Super Draws and Event Draws are special drawings when the Jackpot is set to a guaranteed amount, initially at €100 million then at €130 million. The difference is that a Super Draw jackpot will roll over to the next drawing if not won, but an Event Draw jackpot will be distributed among the winners in the next lower tier (i.e. match 5 + 1). Until now, jackpots in a Super Draw have rolled over to the next drawing if not won.

The first Super Draw of 2011 took place on Tuesday 10 May to mark the introduction of the second weekly Euromillions draw and changes to the game format (11 lucky stars instead of 9 and a new "match 2 main numbers and no lucky stars" prize tier).

The first Super Draw of 2016 took place on Friday 30 September to introduce the change to the game format (12 lucky stars instead of 11 and increased price).

Event Draws have been held to date on

- 9 February 2007 (€100 million);
- 28 September 2007 (€130 million);
- 8 February 2008 (€130 million);
- 26 September 2008 (€130 million).

Super Draws have been held to date on

- 6 March 2009 (€100 million);
- 18 September 2009 (€100 million);
- 5 February 2010 (€100 million);
- 1 October 2010 (€100 million);
- 10 May 2011 (€100 million);
- 4 October 2011 (€100 million);
- 28 September 2012 (€100 million);
- 22 March 2013 (€100 million);
- 7 June 2013 (€100 million);
- 15 November 2013 (€100 million);
- 7 March 2014 (€100 million);
- 3 October 2014 (€100 million);
- 6 March 2015 (€100 million);
- 5 June 2015 (€100 million);
- 6 November 2015 (€100 million);
- 30 September 2016 (€130 million);
- 30 June 2017 (€100 million);
- 15 September 2017 (€130 million);
- 20 April 2018 (€130 million);
- 21 September 2018 (€130 million);
- 1 February 2019 (€120 million);
- 7 June 2019 (€130 million);
- 7 February 2020 (€130 million);
- 3 July 2020 (€130 million);
- 25 September 2020 (€130 million);
- 20 November 2020 (€130 million);
- 5 February 2021 (€130 million);
- 4 June 2021 (€130 million);
- 24 September 2021 (€130 million);
- 4 February 2022 (€130 million);
- 17 June 2022 (€130 million);
- 9 September 2022 (€130 million);
- 2 December 2022 (€130 million);
- 3 March 2023 (€130 million);
- 2 June 2023 (€130 million);
- 29 September 2023 (€130 million);
- 1 December 2023 (€200 million);
- 26 January 2024 (€130 million);
- 15 March 2024 (€130 million);
- 7 June 2024 (€130 million);
- 27 September 2024 (€130 million);
- 7 March 2025 (€130 million);
- 26 September 2025 (€130 million);
- 5 December 2025 (€130 million);
- 20 February 2026 (€130 million).

A €100,000,000 Super draw was planned for 6 June 2014 but was cancelled when the jackpot rolled over to €105,000,000. This also happened for the superdraw that was planned for Friday 29 April 2022.

This is a change to the game rules as of 4 April 2011 when the Event Draw was added.

== Notable wins ==
Rank	Date	EUR	GBP	CHF	Country
1	2025-08-19	250,000,000	216,150,000	235,667,500	France
1	2025-06-17	250,000,000	213,650,000	233,712,750	Ireland
1	2025-03-28	250,000,000	209,088,000	239,178,000	Austria
4	2023-12-08	240,000,000	206,064,000	227,926,800	Austria
5	2022-07-19	230,000,000	195,707,000	228,674,050	UK
6	2021-10-15	220,000,000	185,548,000	236,271,420	France
7	2022-05-10	215,840,341	184,263,000	225,600,000	UK
8	2024-06-25	213,887,390	180,756,232	205,442,902	Portugal
9	2024-11-26	212,448,937	177,033,699	197,922,103	UK
10	2021-02-26	210,000,000	182,028,000	230,223,000	Switzerland
11	2026-03-10	209,527,211	181,073,416	189,916,721	UK
12	2020-12-11	200,000,000	183,120,000	215,862,600	France

The first huge jackpot of over €115.4 million was won by Irish woman Dolores McNamara on 29 July 2005. On 3 February 2006, three winners shared the record jackpot of €183 million after the first rank was eleven draws vacant. Two French people and one Portuguese received €61,191,026 each. In order to limit the jackpot from growing higher, the rules of the game in the period from 2006 to 2009 stipulated that after the twelfth draw without a winner before the jackpot amount would be rolled down and shared between the winners in the next prize tier. This happened for the first time on 17 November 2006, after over €183 million had accumulated in the jackpot. The sum was shared between the winners of the second rank (there were 20 winners of €9.6 million each). The first highest jackpot with €190 million was won by the Bayford couple from England on 10 August 2012, and they received "only" £148.7 million because of the strength of the pound. The €185 million (£161.6 million) jackpot that was won by the Weir couple from Scotland on 12 July 2011 was considered to be the highest jackpot in the UK until the win on 8 October 2019, jackpot of €190 million (£170.2 million) was won by a single ticket holder in the UK bearing the winning numbers – 7, 10, 15, 44, 49 and the lucky stars were 3 and 12.

A jackpot of nearly €175.5 million was won by a family syndicate of 8 siblings (7 alive and one who had died but whose family were still included in the winnings) who were from County Dublin in Ireland on 19 February 2019. The highest jackpot ever won in the UK, was £195,707,000 (€230,000,000), on 19 July 2022. The winning numbers were 6, 21, 23, 27, 40 and the lucky stars were 2 and 12.

On 10 March 2026, a UK ticket holder won £181.1 million (€210,000,000), the third-largest win in UK history. The winning numbers were 12, 14, 27, 44 and 50 and the lucky stars were 4 and 12.

== Distribution of revenue ==
In the UK, the total EuroMillions revenue is broken down as follows:

Breakdown of UK EuroMillions revenue
0.5%	in profit to Allwyn UK
4.5%	in operating costs
5%	in commission to retailers
12%	to the UK Government (Lottery Duty)
28%	to charitable causes
50%	to winners

== Email scams making use of EuroMillions brand name ==
Chris and Colin Weir won the EuroMillions and pledged to donate their prize money to good causes. However, cybercriminals started using their names in their email scams to fool the general public and ultimately cheat them of money.

== EuroMillions Plus (Ireland only) ==
In June 2007, the Irish National Lottery introduced "Plus," an add-on to the main EuroMillions game available only to Irish players. For an extra €1 per line, players can enter their five main EuroMillions numbers in an additional draw for a fixed, non-rolling jackpot of €500,000. Players can also win fixed prizes of €2,000 for a Match-4 and €20 for a Match-3. The odds of winning the Plus jackpot are 1 in 2,118,760.

== UK Millionaire Maker ==
Since November 2009, at least one UK player every week has won a guaranteed £1,000,000. With the introduction of the Tuesday EuroMillions Draw on Tuesday 10 May 2011, there were two Millionaire Raffle winners each week. Changes to EuroMillions in September 2016 meant that two guaranteed Millionaire Raffle winners were made per draw, or 4 per week across the two draws.

According to the EuroMillions website, the chances of winning the UK Millionaire Maker game on a Tuesday can be estimated as 1 in 3,570,000 with a standard £1m jackpot. On a Friday, it can be calculated as approximately 1 in 5,080,000 – again with a baseline £1m jackpot. Winning in this game depends entirely on the number of the payslips sold so the odds fluctuate. The odds may also fluctuate during a super draw or a special event in the UK Millionaire Raffle.

Prices per line in the UK increased by 50p to £2.00. The 50p was added due to weak exchange rates between the pound and the euro and to cover the expense of the new Millionaire Maker. On 24 September 2016, the price per line in the UK was increased by an additional 50p to £2.50. In January 2019, the number of guaranteed winners in the UK Millionaire Maker game reverted to one.

== See also ==
- Eurojackpot - a similar transnational lottery in Croatia, Czech Republic, Denmark, Estonia, Finland, Germany, Greece, Hungary, Iceland, Italy, Latvia, Lithuania, Netherlands, Norway, Poland, Slovakia, Slovenia, Spain and Sweden.
- Vikinglotto - a similar transnational lottery in Denmark, Sweden, Norway, Finland, Iceland, Latvia, Lithuania, Estonia, Slovenia and Belgium.
