= International Lottery in Liechtenstein Foundation =

Former state controlled lottery in Liechtenstein

International Lottery in Liechtenstein Foundation (ILLF) was a government authorised and state controlled charitable foundation that operated Internet lotteries. The foundation pioneered Internet gaming, having launched the web's first online lottery, PLUS Lotto, in 1995 and processed the first online gaming transaction ever. It supported charitable causes in Liechtenstein, many of which support projects in poorer nations internationally. ILLF filed for bankruptcy in September 2011.

== Chronology ==
In early 1995, executives of London Mall, a British software developer conceived the idea of an Internet lottery. A license to run a fixed odds Internet lottery, without international marketing restrictions, was obtained from the Liechtenstein government. The International Lottery in Liechtenstein Foundation (ILLF), a charitable foundation, was formed to operate this lottery, then called Interlotto. It also introduced the first instant scratchcard games on the Internet during this time.

The first Interlotto ticket was sold to Mario Frick, the Prime Minister of Liechtenstein (December 15, 1993 - April 5, 2001). The first Interlotto draw took place at the Köfferli bar in the quaint capital of Vaduz, Liechtenstein on the Saturday evening of 7 October 1995. Caroline Burdet, Liechtenstein's first Olympic bobsledder, drew the winning six numbers for what is billed as the first nationally sanctioned lottery on the Internet.

Fourteen months later, on 13 January 1997 the lottery site was renamed from Interlotto to PLUS Lotto following an agreement with the International Federation of Red Cross and Red Crescent Societies (IFRC), one of the world's best known and most respected humanitarian organisations, whereby the IFRC would become its major beneficiary. The first draw under the PLUS Lotto name took place on 18 April 1997.

== Regulation ==
ILLF was licensed by the government of Liechtenstein to operate its lotteries. The license was highly regulated, with government appointed auditors (Thöny Treuhand AG, Vaduz) auditing the ILLF books of account and overseeing all aspects of the operations including scrutinization of lottery pre-draw and draw procedures. This includes all lottery games as well as the instant win games.

Thawte certified the ILLF sites to guarantee personal information such as credit card details is protected and securely processed.

The larger Jackpot prizes were insured through R K Harrison Group Limited, a Lloyd's broker, to ensure guaranteed Jackpot prize payouts.

Liechtensteinische Landesbank AG held the player funds from transactions made on all the ILLF operated sites to assure funds were securely held and paid out to players. Liechtensteinische Landesbank AG, a AAA rated bank, is predominately owned by the Principality of Liechtenstein.

== Charity ==
An integral part of ILLF was its focus on charities. All the lottery sites in the ILLF network set aside a portion of revenue to fund causes in Liechtenstein and around the world. All donations are made at the discretion of the Charity Allocation Committee which is controlled by the Liechtenstein government.

== ILLF Network ==
ILLF operated many websites, referred to as the ILLF brands. Combined, these brands offered a wide array of games to choose from.

- World Lotto Corporation
- Lotto.li
- PLUS Lotto

All sites now redirect to the main ILLF home page, discussing the reasons for the filing of bankruptcy.

== Games ==
Several games operated under the ILLF brands:

- Lotteries
- Instant Win Games
- Scratchcards

=== Lotteries ===
ILLF offered two weekly lotteries and one monthly lottery.

==== Weekly 6/49 Lottery ====
In every lotto draw, six numbers plus one bonus number were drawn from a range of balls numbered 1 to 49. Players choose six different numbers plus a bonus number by a method of their own choosing. Prizes were awarded for matching two, three, four, five or six numbers as well as five plus the bonus ball and six plus the bonus ball. 55545789

==== Draw ====
The 6/49 lottery draw was conducted every Friday at ILLF's studio in Liechtenstein and is scrutinized by an auditor from Thöny Treuhand AG, Vaduz. Draws were performed using one of two mechanical ball machines manufactured by Editec (France). Prior to the draw a ball set was selected at random and test draws were carried out to ensure that the machine and ball sets have not been tampered with. After the draw an independent program is run by the auditor and the results compared to the database to verify that the data is correct and there are no errors. The draw was filmed and then made available via the Internet.

The Prize Pool for the 6/49 lottery draw was 90% of the value of the ticket price. The allocation is as follows:

- 2% for a 6 number match, plus bonus ball
- 8% for a 6 number match
- 10% for promotional incentive prizes
- on average 2% for a 5 number match, plus bonus ball
- on average 4% for a 5 number match
- on average 7% for a 4 number match
- on average 30% for a 3 number match
- on average 37% for a 2 number match

Match	Prize	Odds of winning (1 in)
6 of 49 and bonus ball	20,000,000.00	601,304,088
6 of 49	2,000,000.00	14,316,764
5 of 49 and bonus ball	Pro-rata share of the remainder of the Prize Pool	1,179,027
5 of 49	Pro-rata share of the remainder of the prize	56,812
4 of 49	120.00	1,032
3 of 49	30.00	56
2 of 49	5.00	7

The overall odds of winning any prize were 1 in 6.63.

==== Little Big One ====
Little Big One was a weekly lotto where 5 from 15 balls are drawn. Each ticket contains 5 numbers chosen from 15. There were a maximum of 3003 tickets available in every weekly draw. There were three prize categories to be won, including winning for matching zero balls. Since each ticket number is sold only once, winners do not share prizes. The Jackpot is a guaranteed EUR 2,003.00 per week. The weekly draw was an automated draw using a certified Random Number Generator. The draw took place in Liechtenstein every Wednesday at 11h00 CET but occasionally, due to a "Must be Won Jackpot" feature of the LBO game, could occur earlier.

The Prize Pool for the Little Big One draw was 80% of the ticket price. The allocation is as follows:

- 27.79% for a 5 number match
- 49.95% for a 3 number match
- 20.98% for a 0 number match
- 1.28% for promotional incentive prizes

Match	Prize (EUR)	Odds of winning (1 in)
5 of 15	2003.00	3003
3 of 15	8.00	6.7
0 of 15	6.00	11.9

The overall odds of winning any prize were 1 in 4.27.

==== Equinox Lottery ====
The Equinox Lottery was a monthly lottery with draws occurring every month on the same date as the next Equinox (the days when the Sun is directly above the Earth's equator and day and night are about the same length everywhere in the world). In 2010, this was on January 22, February 22, March 22, April 20, May 20, June 21, July 20, August 20, September 22, October 22, November 22 and December 22. There were only 2,000 ticket numbers offered in each draw. The purchase price of a complete Ticket Number is EUR 45. Each Ticket Number consists of 3 Shares. The purchase price of a Share is EUR 15. Players can choose to purchase a complete Ticket Number and/or up to 3 shares, depending on the number of shares already sold in the ticket. It was a raffle style draw with a Prize Pool worth up to EUR 45,000.00 and up to 565 cash prizes were awarded.

Divisions	Prize (EUR)	Odds of winning (1 in)	Number of winning tickets	In order to win
All	45,000.00	3.54	565	Any Prize
1st	18,000.00	2,000	1	Match all 5 in order
2nd	750.00	2,000	1	Match all 5 in order
3rd	600.00	2,000	1	Match all 5 in order
4th	450.00	2,000	1	Match all 5 in order
5th	300.00	2,000	1	Match all 5 in order
6th	135.00	2,000	1	Match all 5 in order
Sub	180.00	2,000	2	Nearest number to 1st prize
Sub	180.00	2,000	2	Nearest number to 2nd prize
Sub	180.00	2,000	2	Nearest number to 3rd prize
Sub	17,820.00	20.2	297	First 3 Digits of 1st, 2nd & 3rd
Sub	3,420.00	105.3	57	Last 2 Digits of 1st, 2nd & 3rd
Sub	2,985.00	10.1	199	Last 1 Digit of 1st

The odds were 1 in 3.54 to win a prize and 1 in 5.45 to make a profit.

=== Instant Win Games ===
PLUS Lotto offered a variety of online instant win games. The player could win up to EUR 10,000.00 instantly.

=== Scratchcards ===
PLUS Lotto offered seven online scratchcard games. Each scratchcard ranges from a cost of EUR 1 to EUR 7. Prizes up to EUR 100,000.00 could be won.
