= Eurojackpot =

European Lottery

- A map of Europe with the countries that participate in Eurojackpot marked in blue
- Formation: March 2012; 14 years ago
- Location: Europe
- Website: www.eurojackpot.com

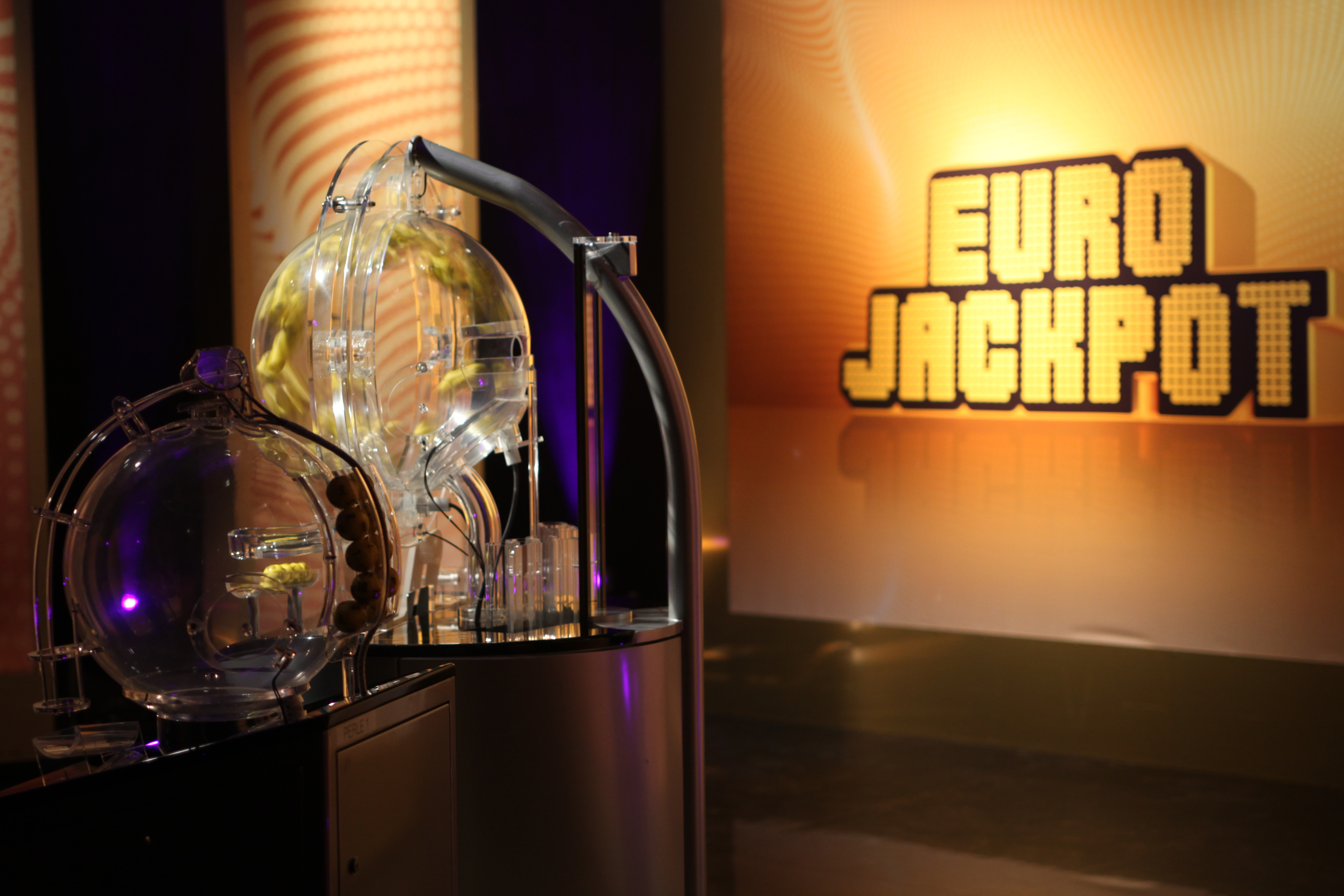
The Eurojackpot

Eurojackpot is a transnational European lottery launched in March 2012. As of March 2024, the countries participating in the lottery are: Croatia, Czechia, Denmark, Estonia, Finland, Germany, Hungary, Iceland, Italy, Latvia, Lithuania, Netherlands, Norway, Poland, Slovakia, Slovenia, Spain Sweden and Greece.

The jackpot starts at €10,000,000 and can roll over up to €120,000,000. Playing Eurojackpot costs €2 per line (except in Lithuania where it includes a compulsory additional game called 'Joker' that increases the price to €3 per line, in Greece where its costs €2.50 per line, in Poland where its costs 12,50 PLN (roughly 3€), and in Slovenia where it costs €2.50 per line).

The goal is to match five correct numbers out of fifty, plus another two supplementary numbers out of a further twelve; the odds of winning the jackpot are 1:140,000,000. There are twelve tiers of prizes for Eurojackpot.

The lottery draw takes place every Tuesday at 21:15 and Friday at 21:00 local time in Helsinki. The evaluation of the winning lottery tickets is done in Germany and Denmark.

== Odds ==
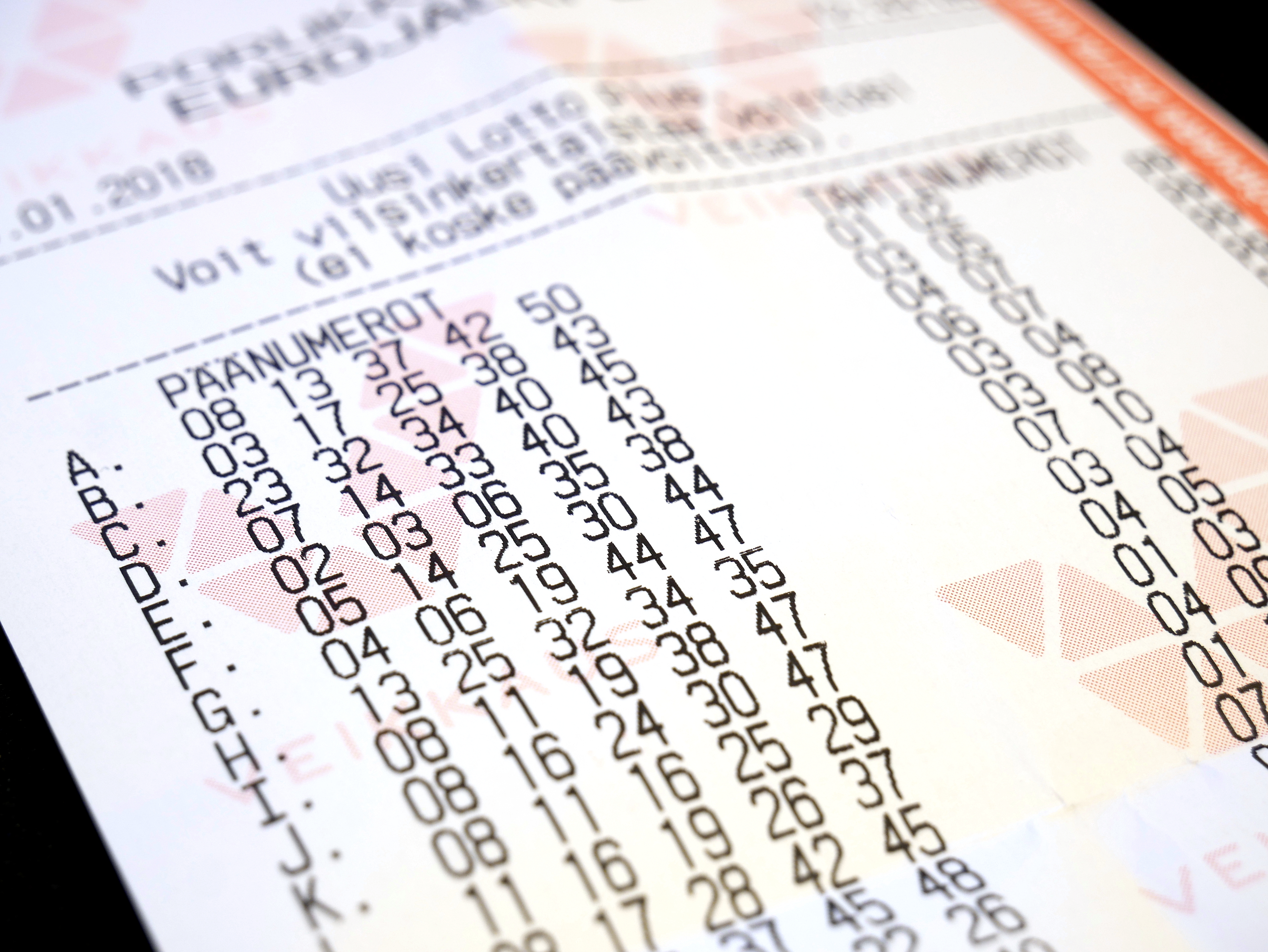
Finnish Eurojackpot ticket

Winning Class	Numbers Correct	Odds of Winning
1	Match 5 + 2 Euro numbers	1 in 139,838,160
2	Match 5 + 1 Euro number	1 in 6,991,908
3	Match 5 + 0 Euro numbers	1 in 3,107,515
4	Match 4 + 2 Euro numbers	1 in 621,503
5	Match 4 + 1 Euro number	1 in 31,075
6	Match 3 + 2 Euro numbers	1 in 14,125
7	Match 4 + 0 Euro numbers	1 in 13,811
8	Match 2 + 2 Euro numbers	1 in 985
9	Match 3 + 1 Euro number	1 in 706
10	Match 3 + 0 Euro numbers	1 in 314
11	Match 1 + 2 Euro numbers	1 in 188
12	Match 2 + 1 Euro number	1 in 49

+ Greece only, since March 2024: Winning Class 13, Correct 1+1, Odds of Winning 1 in 9

== Jackpot behaviour ==
Up to January 31, 2013 the Eurojackpot lottery had a 'rolldown' clause: in case the jackpot is not won for twelve consecutive draws, the thirteenth draw will be subject to a rolldown whereby if no winner is able to match all seven winning numbers, the jackpot is paid out to the next winning tier where a winner is available. It was this clause that set the previous jackpot record of €27,545,857.50 in August 2012, as a German player who correctly matched the five main numbers, but only one of the Euronumbers (out of two), walked away with the jackpot in the second prize tier.

For the groups except the first one, the winning amounts are calculated nationally, and they can vary by country based on number of winners, lottery tax and other reasons.

== Notable wins ==
Rank	Date	Prize (€)	Country
1	13 October 2026	120,000,000	Germany
1	26 May 2026	120,000,000	(Czech Republic) Czechia
1	23 September 2025	120,000,000	Germany
1	9 May 2025	120,000,000	Germany
1	4 June 2024	120,000,000	Denmark
1	16 January 2024	120,000,000	Norway
1	23 June 2023	120,000,000	Germany
1	8 November 2022	120,000,000	Germany
1	22 July 2022	120,000,000	Denmark
10	4 August 2023	117,242,386	Germany

The maximum jackpot of €120 million was reached for the first time on Tuesday 19th July 2022. Nobody won in that draw, but a player from Denmark did win in the following draw on Friday 22nd July.

The second largest jackpot was set on May 20, 2022, when a fifteen-player syndicate from Germany won €110 million. This prize was the first jackpot over €90 million to be won following Eurojackpot's rule changes in March 2022, which increased the jackpot cap to €120 million.

The previous record, and cap, was €90,000,000. This sum was first won on May 15, 2015 by a person from the Czech Republic.

The first event when multiple players have won the same divided jackpot was on 7 January 2017. For the first time, five people (one from each German federal states of Berlin, Niedersachsen and Hessen, with a winner from Denmark and one from the Netherlands) won €18,000,000 after a week when the maximum Jackpot with €90,000,000 hadn't been drawn. It was followed by the next multiple 5+2 win on 10 February, when a Hungarian player won the country's biggest-ever lottery prize (overtaking the most famous 5/90 Ötöslottó's record with 5092 million Forint, valued at €19,216,280.26 on 28 November 2003).

A Finnish syndicate of fifty players from Siilinjärvi, who had played a system ticket with four predictions in the 7/3 system mode for a total amount of €504, won on August 23, 2019 the maximum jackpot amount plus further winnings from the lower prize categories thus the record win of €91,938,695.

On 22 November 2019, one Hungarian and two German players won €90,000,000. Each player won €30,000,000 (The one Hungarian player won more than 10 billion Forint, which is the country's biggest-ever lottery prize, overtaking again the most famous 5/90 Ötöslottó's most record with 6431 million Forint, valued at €24,267,124.51 on 28 March 2020).

The final capped €90,000,000 jackpot was won on March 18, 2022, with tickets purchased in Finland and Norway.

On 9 December 2022, a Hungarian player won €75,871,602 (over 30 billion Forint), breaking the previous record of 10 billion Forint, from the 22 November 2019 draw. Also, two other Hungarian players won €745,969.40 (over 300 million Forint), along with a Finnish player, by matching 5+1 numbers.

=== Notable wins by country ===
Accurate as of 21 November 2026

The jackpot was paid out 171 times (including one time in rank 2), good for 203 jackpot winners.

Jackpot winners by country
Country	Jackpot winners
Germany	100
Finland	26
Denmark	14
Sweden	12
Norway	10
Poland	8
Spain	7
Slovenia	6
Italy	4
Hungary	4
Czechia	4
Netherlands	2
Lithuania	2
Slovakia	2
Croatia	1
Greece	1
Estonia	0
Latvia	0
Iceland	0
Total	203

== History ==
The Eurojackpot lottery was proposed in 2006, to compete with the EuroMillions lottery. By virtue of a large number of participating countries, the EuroMillions is able to offer considerably larger jackpots than those offered in a single national lottery. After seeing the success of EuroMillions, Germany, Finland, Denmark, Slovenia, Italy and the Netherlands met in Amsterdam in November 2011 to complete the negotiations for the Eurojackpot lottery and to begin the roll out in 2012. After the negotiations, Estonia also decided to participate in the lottery. The first ticket sales began on March 17, 2012 while the first ever draw took place on March 23, 2012.

Spain joined the Eurojackpot from 30 June 2012 with the ticket concession granted to ONCE, the National Organization of Spanish blind people. On February 1, 2013 Croatia, Iceland, Latvia, Lithuania, Norway and Sweden came along. Czechia and Hungary joined the Eurojackpot from October 10, 2014, Slovakia from October 9, 2015, Poland from September 15, 2017 and Greece in March 2024. In comparison, the Eurojackpot has a wider reach of potential players with an audience in local countries of 300 million, compared to the 217 million of Euromillions.

The gameplay changed on Friday October 10, 2014 with the number of the smaller set, the "Euro Numbers", in the Perle machine (later changed with a machine named as Opale XL) increasing from eight to ten. The odds of winning the jackpot decreased from 1:59,325,280 to 1:95,344,200. In March 2022, further changes made to the game rules. The guess range for Euro Numbers expanded from 1-10 to 1-12. The jackpot cap grew to €120 million. In addition, the new EuroJackpot rules also brought a new draw day on Tuesday. The first drawing with the new rules was planned for March 25, 2022, with no change in ticket pricing. The odds for winning the jackpot was decreased to 1:139,838,160

In March 2024, the draws adopted a new set design, replacing the previous set that was used since the beginning.

== Participating countries ==
Eurojackpot is available to the residents of the countries participating in the official draw i.e. Croatia, Denmark, Estonia, Finland, Germany, Iceland, Italy, Latvia, Lithuania, the Netherlands, Norway, Slovenia, Spain and Sweden. Czechia and Hungary joined in October 2014. Slovakia joined in October 2015, Poland in September 2017 and Greece in March 2024. The organisers also provide official websites to support retail sales, where it is possible to view the results of the draws shortly after they are recorded.

Spain is the only country to participate in both EuroMillions and Eurojackpot lottery games.

== Private operators ==
A number of non-official online lottery sites provide tickets or bets on the Eurojackpot lottery. Some of these operators are state-licensed, while others are not. Generally, lottery tickets are restricted to purchase by adults, according to the Age of majority in a particular country. Countries such as Slovenia, Iceland and Italy restrict most private operators from offering lotteries.

== See also ==
- EuroMillions - a similar transnational lottery in Austria, Belgium, France, Ireland, Luxembourg, Portugal, Spain, Switzerland and the United Kingdom.
- Vikinglotto - a similar transnational lottery in Denmark, Estonia, Finland, Iceland, Norway, Latvia, Lithuania, Sweden, Slovenia and Belgium.
