= Millionaire Life =

Canadian lottery game

Millionaire Life logo

Millionaire Life was a national promotional lottery game that offered a top prize of $1 million a year for 25 years, four prizes of $1 million and 20 prizes of $100,000. It has been run four times across Canada between 2007 and 2011.

== Organization ==
The Millionaire Life promotional lottery game is administered by the Interprovincial Lottery Corporation, an alliance of the five regional (some provincial) lottery corporations that cover all of Canada.

== 2007 promotion ==
The winning ticket was purchased by Jagtesh and Gurinder Grewal, both of Winnipeg, Manitoba. They split the lump sum payment of $17 million instead of the annuity of $1 million a year for 25 years because there was more than one person claiming the prize.

== 2008 promotion ==
The winning ticket was purchased by a Burnaby, British Columbia woman, Angela Towle. She opted for the lump sum of $17 million.

== 2009 promotion ==
The winning ticket was purchased by Faye Lepage of Edmonton, Alberta. She opted for the lump sum of $17 million.

== 2011 promotion ==
Millionaire Life ran from March 1 to 31, 2011, with the draw happening the night of March 31. The winning ticket was purchased in Quebec.

== Future ==
Millionaire Life did not run in 2012. Ending the Millionaire Life lottery being replaced by the Daily Grand.

== See also ==
- Interprovincial Lottery Corporation
- Lotto 6/49
- Lotto Super 7 (replaced by Lotto Max in September 2009)
