= British Columbia Lottery Corporation =

Canadian gambling corporation

- Type: Crown corporation
- Industry: Gaming
- Founded: 1985; 41 years ago
- Headquarters: 74 Seymour Street West; Kamloops, British Columbia; V2C 1E2
- Key people: Pat Davis, President and CEO 2022- Present; Lynda Cavanaugh, Interim President and CEO 2021-2022; Greg Moore, Interim President and CEO 2019-2021; Jim Lightbody, President and CEO 2014-2021; Michael Graydon, President and CEO 2008-2014; Vic Poleschuk, President and CEO 1999-2007; Guy Simonis, President and CEO 1985 (inception)-1999
- Products: Lotteries
- Revenue: $1.6 billion FY2022
- Owner: Government of British Columbia
- Number of employees: 900
- Website: bclc.com

The British Columbia Lottery Corporation (BCLC) is a Crown corporation in the province of British Columbia. The BCLC conducts and manages all lottery, sports betting, and casino gambling in the province, and is the sole licensed online casino operator in BC, Manitoba, and Saskatchewan via its subsidiary PlayNow.

Its authority is governed by the Gaming Control Act, and overseen by the province's Independent Gambling Control Office (IGCO). Its headquarters are located in Kamloops.

== History ==
Lotteries in British Columbia were originally overseen by the Western Canada Lottery Corporation (WCLC) as part of a consortium with Alberta, Saskatchewan, and Manitoba. In 1985, British Columbia broke away from the consortium and established the BCLC. Lottery revenue was used to help subsidize Expo 86 in Vancouver.

BCLC served as a partner of the 2010 Winter Olympics in Vancouver; a special scratch-and-win game called "SportFunder" was launched in 2006, whose revenue provided funding for amateur sports in BC. Its grand prize were tickets to the Games' opening ceremony.

In 2010, the BCLC launched an online casino via its website PlayNow.com; the service was Canada's first legal online casino. In January 2013, BCLC announced a partnership with the Manitoba Lotteries Corporation to launch online gambling in Manitoba via a localized version of PlayNow.

In 2016, PlayNow Sports notably began to allow betting on the outcome of United States presidential elections; the 2016 presidential election would become the most-wagered event in the platform's history (surpassing sporting events including the Super Bowl), with around $800,000 in total wagers. This would be surpassed in 2020, when over $4.5 million in bets were placed on that year's election. In both cases, wagers favoured Donald Trump.

In 2019, the BCLC contracted Intralot to develop and deploy a new retail lottery system; the new cloud-based infrastructure went online in May 2024, accompanied by upgrades to its network of self-service terminals, and a relaunch of its retail sportsbook in September 2024 as ProLine under a revamped platform by Intralot.

In 2024, BCLC established an "AI and Data Innovation Hub" in partnership with UK-based Future Anthem, aiming to collaborate on improving BCLC's products and services via artificial intelligence.

== Structure ==
The BCLC is governed under British Columbia's Gaming Control Act, and led by a board of directors appointed by the Lieutenant Governor in Council. It reports to the Minister of Finance, and the Independent Gambling Control Office (IGCO), which regulates casinos, lotteries, horse racing, and charitable gaming in British Columbia. Prior to April 13, 2026, BCLC reported to the Gaming Policy and Enforcement Branch (GPEB) in the Ministry of Public Safety and Solicitor General.

== Operations ==
The BCLC's headquarters are located in Kamloops; it is one of the largest employers in the city, with approximately 500 employees.

=== Lottery products ===
BCLC sells lottery products such as draw games, retail sports betting, and scratch tickets via retail locations, and a network of self-service terminals situated at licensed establishments (including bars and restaurants) across the province. As a member of the Interprovincial Lottery Corporation, BCLC participates in the national Lotto 6/49, Lotto Max, and Daily Grand games. Regional lottery games operated by BCLC include:

- BC 49: A regional version of Lotto 6/49, played alongside the national version on Wednesdays and Saturdays. It offers a fixed jackpot of $2 million on each drawing.
- BC 50/50: A 50/50 raffle. Drawings are held four times per-day at 1, 3, 6 and 9 p.m. PT.
- Keno
- Pacific Hold'Em Poker: A Texas hold 'em-based game with draws held every six minutes.

=== Casinos ===
BCLC oversees all gaming facilities in British Columbia, which are run by private owner-operators under service agreements with the corporation. As of fiscal year 2025–26, this included 22 full-service casinos, and 12 "community gaming centres" (CGCs)—which are smaller-scale gaming parlours with a focus on slots, bingo, food service, and entertainment. BCLC began to deploy the CGC concept in 2004 as a modernization of the province's bingo parlours. A loyalty program known as Encore Rewards is offered across BC casinos.

In the mid-2020s, a number of commercial casinos in BC began to be acquired by First Nations-run companies; Great Canadian Gaming sold nearly all its properties (aside from its Chances CGC in Dawson Creek) in the province to First Nations, including its River Rock resort in Richmond. Although owned by First Nations-run companies, these properties are still classified and regulated as commercial casinos rather than tribal casinos.

=== Online gambling ===
BCLC operates a provincial online casino under the PlayNow.com banner, which includes slots, table games, and sports betting. As part of partnerships with their provincial governments, PlayNow also operates in Manitoba via the Manitoba Liquor & Lotteries Corporation, and in Saskatchewan via the Saskatchewan Indian Gaming Authority (SIGA).

The BCLC raised concerns over competition with grey market online gambling services that are not licensed to operate in British Columbia, including the extraprovincial marketing of services licensed to operate in Ontario (including via television advertising and media partnerships, which PlayNow has to compete with territorially) under its regulated private market.

=== Sportsbooks ===
BCLC offers sports betting online via PlayNow Sports, and at retail under the ProLine brand.

BCLC previously offered retail sports betting under the Sports Action brand. After 33 years, Sports Action was discontinued in May 2024 as part of BCLC's system migration, and re-launched under a new platform as ProLine in September 2024; the revamped game was designed to better compete with grey market sportsbooks by offering a wider array of betting options (including a particular expansion focusing on regional teams) and the possibility for other future capabilities (such as live odds, and integration with BCLC's self-service terminals). The game also transitioned to a paperless model, with users constructing their betting slip using the ProLine app, and then scanning a QR code at a lottery retailer. While other provinces have adopted similar systems, BCLC was the first to discontinue selection slips entirely.

In February 2025, BCLC began to open ProLine Sportsbook Lounges at selected casinos, including the Parq Vancouver.

=== Responsible gambling ===
In 2009, BCLC launched a campaign known as "GameSense", which encompasses resources and tools discussing the operation of casino games, and information on responsible gambling practices. BC casinos and CGCs feature GameSense booths where patrons can view these resources and consult with a staff "advisor". BCLC has licensed the GameSense campaign to other gaming operators in Canada, including Alberta's AGLC, and Saskatchewan's SIGA and LGS. It has also licensed the program in the United States, including in the state of Massachusetts, and to MGM Resorts International.

In 2019, BCLC introduced an optional service known as "PlayPlanner", which allows customers to set time and spending limits on electronic gaming machines. BCLC provides voluntary self-exclusion services, branded since 2023 as "Game Break". That year, in order to enhance enforcement of self-exclusion and for other security reasons, a new policy was instituted which requires that valid identification be presented on arrival at all BC casinos.

== Revenue ==
Revenue from BCLC's operations are used to support provincial programs and charitable causes, including cultural initiatives, education, and health care. 7% of all BCLC revenue is distributed to First Nations communities. A 2025 study by Thompson Rivers University found that the BCLC has, in particular, contributed at least $2.52 billion to Kamloops' economy alone, via direct contributions to local causes, and the operations of its headquarters.

In fiscal year 2024–25, BCLC had a net revenue of $1.408 billion, with casino gaming accounting for 65% of total revenue.

== Criticism ==
=== Involvement in money laundering ===
In 2017, the BC government commissioned an independent report lawyer and former RCMP deputy commissioner Peter German on money laundering traced to the province's casinos, based on allegations presented in the "Project Sidewinder" report by the Canadian Security Intelligence Service (CSIS) and Royal Canadian Mounted Police (RCMP); the "Dirty Money" reports alleged that Chinese transnational drug syndicates were laundering money through BC casinos via "VIP" gamblers, opoid sales, and real estate, and that BC minister of finance Mike de Jong had been warned in 2016 that the River Rock Casino had been underreporting "suspicious and large cash transactions".

In May 2019, based on the findings of the Dirty Money reports, the BC government opened an inquiry by Supreme Court of British Columbia justice Austin Cullen. The Cullen Commission found that the BCLC and other parties actively ignored repeated warnings from law enforcement surrounding money laundering until 2015, specifically noting that the BCLC demonstrated "a completely unacceptable and unreasonable risk tolerance". It found that former BCLC CEO Michael Graydon had prioritized the corporation's profits over responsible operations, including making moves to attract "VIP" baccarat players from Macau to BC casinos, and intervening in concerns over suspiciously large buy-ins from their top customers). The Commission also questioned the conduct of minister of gaming Rich Coleman, noting that he "[arranged] for an independent review of anti-money laundering measures in the gaming industry, but he did not take action to stem the flow of the suspicious cash transactions that he had been warned about."

Per the recommendations of the Cullen Commission and the Dirty Money report, the BC government passed a revision to the Gaming Control Act that, effective April 13, 2026, establishes an Independent Gambling Control Office (IGCO) to oversee the BCLC, charitable gaming, and horse racing.
