= 6/49 =

6/49 may refer to:

- Lotto 6/49, a lottery in Canada
- Super Lotto 6/49, a lottery in the Philippines
