= Wintario =

Canadian lottery game

- Genre: Lottery game show
- Country of origin: Canada
- Original language: English
- No. of seasons: 15
- No. of episodes: 647

Production
- Production locations: Various locations across Ontario, Canada
- Running time: 30 minutes (including commercials)
- Production company: Ontario Lottery Corporation

Original release
- Network: Global Television Network (Ontario only)
- Release: May 15, 1975 – January 4, 1990

Wintario was the first lottery game offered by the Ontario Lottery Corporation in Ontario, Canada.

Beginning in May 1975, Wintario, Ontario's flagship lottery was born. Conceived by Ontario's Progressive Conservative Government, Wintario came from an idea that it could raise money for worthwhile community recreational projects from which the province could benefit. The first draw was held from the Ontario Science Centre in Toronto on May 15, 1975 and broadcast on television with Fred Davis and Charlie Farquharson, Don Harron's alter ego. He came up with Wintario's first button presser selected from the audience. It was decided that Wintario draw its winning numbers in communities that the Ministries of Tourism and Recreation and Citizenship and Culture helped through lottery funds.

The next nine Wintario draws were not televised, but took place in communities such as Plantagenet, Wallaceburg, Bracebridge, Oakville and St. Catharines, to name a few. In October 1975, in Sault Ste. Marie, the draw began broadcasting on the Global Television Network, hosted initially by Fred Davis and Faye Dance.

Greg Beresford replaced Davis when he retired in October 1980. Replacement co-hosts for Dance and Beresford were Pam Henry and CHFI-FM's Sandy Hoyt. Bill Lawrence also filled in during the early 1980s.

== Travels ==
The Ontario Lottery Corporation had so many requests from towns to host the draw show that many waited for an arena to be built so that Wintario could visit. Draws were held in high schools, theatres, arenas, community centres, and odd places. For instance, one draw was held in a barn in Varna in 1986. Another draw was held on the MS Chi-Cheemaun ferry docked at Tobermory in the summer of 1984. Wintario went to festivals, centennial celebrations and openings of new arenas, launched the annual Ontario plowing matches each fall, kicked off fiddle and step dancing competitions, and celebrated Ontario's bicentennial celebrations in 1984. Wintario during summer months did draws from outdoor sites in Niagara Falls, Kingston, and Barrie. Both Toronto's Canadian National Exhibition and Ottawa's SuperEX were lucky to have hosted Wintario annually to launch their respective summer fairs.

Special one-hour "Yours to Discover Ontario" draws were held often, in which two separate winning numbers were drawn for special weekend getaway packages at Ontario Resorts. Those draws showcased regions of Ontario to boost tourism.

== Draw formats ==
Wintario had many draw formats over its 15-year lifespan. During a live draw, hosts' opening remarks would let viewers know where they were coming from, why they were there. It was 30 minutes of free publicity for the town. A community video would show the town, depicting what the people were like, community history, landmarks, and thanking each place for hosting them. Each host community was given a commemorative "Wintario" plaque as a thank-you gift from the Ontario Lottery Corporation. Another segment would show a lottery-funded grant at work in some Ontario town. Wintario Grants funded nearly every Ontario recreation centre, arena, theatre, art gallery, museum, or local non-profit group. At one point, if a group never applied for a lottery funded grant, the question was "why not"?

Wintario in 1975 was a bi-weekly draw that drew one winning ticket number. Tickets contained a five-digit number that ranged from 10000 to 99999, followed by a series number from one to 96. Based on previous weeks' ticket sales, the number of tickets issued varied depending on customer demand. Retailers often would run out of tickets, as Thursday night became known in Ontario as "Wintario Night". Commercials echoed, "Mondays we bowl, Thursdays we Wintario!"

Wintario went weekly on November 29, 1979 and tickets became a six-digit number ranging from 000000 to 999999. Wintario draws then contained a 3-digit $10 draw, a 4-digit $100 draw, a 5-digit $1000 draw, four 6-digit draws for $25,000, a 6-digit draw worth $100,000 that could be broken down for subsidiary prizes by matching the last five, four or three digits. A 2-digit Win-fall number for free books of five Wintario tickets was also drawn. A show would end with hosts telling players how to claim their tax-free lottery prizes. They would also announce the location of the next live draw.

In the spring of 1982 from St. Clements, Wintario began featuring a weekly Snowball Bonus in which 25 balls, 20 red and five white lettered balls were loaded into a seventh machine. If a red ball fell then they would draw a six-digit number for $1,000. If a white letter ball fell, then the six-digit number "snowballed" into a prize ranging from $50,000 to $500,000. On June 3, 1982, Wintario introduced a new format which featured a unique scramble draw in which lottery players could match six numbers in any order at all and win $50. The Mystery Bonus Wheel was also new and at first featured merchandise prizes like dishwashers, televisions, Coleman camping gear, flatware, a boat, $500 cash, and a car. The show's draw format changed too. The $25,000 prizes were replaced by two $10,000 draws. The grand prize for $100,000 stayed and could be broken down for smaller prizes.

Wintario's format changed again on April 12, 1984 from Cornwall. Wintario now offered three $100,000 grand prize draws, a new top prize of $200,000, and the Mystery Bonus Wheel offered either $10,000 cash or a new car. The show had so many draws in a half-hour that pre-draws had to be done prior to air so that the show could allow the bigger prizes to be done live. Tickets issued now had a letter before the six-digit number. Players who matched the letter with the correct six digits would win the top prizes. The $200,000 now could be broken down by the first or last five, four or three digits.

The final show format change was in April 1986. Wintario was condensed from having 12 draws to five draws in a half-hour. An instant scratch and win box was added to tickets. Players could win small $2 and $5 prizes. Symbols replaced the lettering system. Each six-digit ticket had either a diamond, circle, square, triangle, heart or club. The top prize remained at $200,000.

Every so often Wintario would hold bonus draws; some of those included a Christmas Shoppers Bonus Draw, a Giant Bonus Draw, a Whale of a Bonus Draw, Aloha Bonus, Car-razy Bonus, and the special "10 Winning Years Anniversary" bonus that kept players saving their Wintario ticket stubs for weeks.

== Button pressers ==
People in the audience were selected to press the button that activated each draw from the Ryo-Catteau lottery machines mixing on stage. Known as Wintario Button Pressers, it could be a festival mascot, a recent grand prize winner, a town crier, a performer from the town's pre-show, the mayor, or a member of Ontario's Provincial Parliament.

The machines were manually loaded by three lottery staff introduced at the beginning of the show. Once loaded, Faye would instruct the machines needed to mix. Then she would send the proceedings out to the audience. The cohost would interview the "button presser" and ask them to press the button that activated the trap doors on the lottery machines. It then was a matter of waiting for a ball to come out of each machine. Only one ball was allowed to emerge. Sometimes a machine might take a couple of minutes to drop a ball. The integrity of the draw was monitored by a Montreal Trust officer. Each number was presented to the TV camera by a lottery staffer known as the "ball girl". Faye would announce each number until the proper number of digits needed were read. The machines were reloaded by the ball girl, and the same process would happen again.

One memorable button presser was a man named Bob Thorton, who wished his parents in Huntsville good luck during the $100,000 draw. His parents watching from home won $100,000 from his button press on that very draw. In March 1983 from Cloyne, a 13-year-old girl in the audience named Paula Salmond won $100,000 at the live draw. She had bought the ticket at the door with her birthday money. She was numb when Greg asked her to press the button. A girl named Amy Wynn-Theriault (pronounced Wintario) was a guest on the 500th draw from Campbellford.

== Discontinuation and aftermath ==
Wintario was discontinued in late 1989 as the lottery revenues would no longer go into grant projects, but instead into a general revenue fund. Therefore, Wintario could no longer say it helped the projects it once had. The final draw was held on January 4, 1990 in Sault Ste. Marie. A total of 647 draws from numerous towns, villages and cities across Ontario during the lottery's 15-year existence. It is estimated the lottery and Global Television crews had logged a distance equivalent to nine and a half times around the world just in Ontario.

A Wintario Extra game was introduced after the last draw in 1990, and a new lottery show debuted on TV Ontario, hosted by Sandy Stahlbrand and Kevin Lund. Called Ontario Lottery Live, it included all the Saturday draws and summarized the week's winning numbers for all lottery games. The show had no live audience and paled in comparison to Wintario's live show. Ontario Lottery Live only lasted two years.

In 1995 the ticket price was $10; Wintario was retired a year later. In 1996, the Ontario Lottery and Gaming Corporation discontinued Wintario completely from its lottery line-up.

In 2010, the OLG brought Wintario back as a $2 instant scratch game that was on the market for three months.
