= OCGA =

OCGA may refer to:

- Official Code of Georgia Annotated
- Ontario Charitable Gaming Association
