= Gaming Control Act (Ontario) =

Ontario, Canada statute

Gaming Control Act, 1992

Legislative Assembly of Ontario
- Long title: An Act respecting gaming control activities
- Citation: S.O. 1992, c. 24
- Enacted by: Legislative Assembly of Ontario
- Royal assent: 15 December 1992
- Administered by: Ministry of the Attorney General (1992); subsequently the Ministry of Consumer and Commercial Relations; now the Ministry of the Attorney General

Legislative history
- Bill title: Bill 8
- Status: Amended

The Gaming Control Act was passed in 1992 to control the growth of the gaming industry and the introduction of casinos in Windsor and Niagara Falls, Ontario. The Act was enforced by the Gaming Control Commission Ontario to ensure honesty, integrity, and financial responsibility to participants as well as preventing criminal activity such as lottery scams.

== Who the Gaming Control Act affects ==
The Act affects businesses or individuals that have been authorized to conduct lottery schemes, which supply goods such as bingo paper or lottery tickets, services, and equipment (lottery machines) to charitable and religious organizations.

Gaming Services
Lotteries
Casinos
Horse Racing
Bingo (Commonwealth)

== Registrants ==
There are seven sectors of registration for suppliers.

=== Operator ===
Operators include Bingo Hall owners part of a charity, church, or indian reserve; where break open tickets may or may not be sold, and Commercial Casino Operators.

=== Seller ===
On June 1, 2012, the previously separated distinctions of break open ticket seller and lottery retailer were combined. A seller is authorized to sell lottery products and/or break open tickets in more than one location if they have a valid retailer contract on behalf of the OLG, a licensed charitable or a religious organization. To ensure the integrity of gaming, the seller may not traffic lottery tickets to anyone they are affiliated with, such as: employees, board members, and gaming trade union staff. They are also advised not to sell lottery tickets to individuals who appear intoxicated.

=== Gaming-related supplier ===
A gaming-related supplier may supply or manufacture bingo paper, break open tickets, gaming equipment, and gaming services.

=== Trade union ===
See Trade Union.

=== Category 1 gaming assistant ===
A Category 1 Gaming Assistant may refer to a Gaming Key Employee, Gaming Premises Manager, or Lottery Retailer Manager.

=== Category 2 gaming assistant ===
A Category 2 Gaming Assistant may refer to a Bingo Caller, Croupier, Gaming Employee, or Gaming Services Employee.

== Exemptions ==
People who are exempt from registration as suppliers or gaming assistants include those who provide services without a salary, provide goods or services to themselves, are full-time employees of fundraising for charitable organizations, the employees of a seller, or the owners and operators who grant leases.

== Age documentation ==
Participants are only allowed to game if they have been verified to be the age of majority in Canada. To check a person’s age, their driver’s license, passport, citizenship card, armed forces identification card, certificate of Indian status, liquor control board of Ontario card, photo card under the Photo Card Act, or any other card issued by the government of Canada with a photo of the individual and their date of birth is acceptable to confirm.
