= 649 (disambiguation) =

649 was a common year in the Julian calendar.

649 may also refer to:

- 649 (number)
- Lotto 6/49, a lottery operated in Canada
