= Gaming Control Commission (Ontario) =

Former Canadian government agency

Agency overview
- Dissolved: 1996
- Superseding agency: Alcohol and Gaming Commission of Ontario
- Key document: Gaming Control Act

The Gaming Control Commission was an agency responsible for regulating gambling and other financial games of chance in Ontario. In 1996, it was replaced by the Alcohol and Gaming Commission of Ontario with the passage of the Alcohol and Gaming Regulation and Public Protection Act (Ontario).

== Overview ==
The Alcohol and Gaming Commission of Ontario (AGCO) regulates the operation of casinos, slot machine facilities and internet gaming operated by the Ontario Lottery and Gaming Corporation (OLG). Key activities include:

- Approving and monitoring internal control systems, surveillance and security systems, and other operational systems for casinos, slot machine facilities and internet gaming for compliance with all regulatory requirements.
- Testing, approving and monitoring slot machines and gaming and lottery management systems.
- Inspecting and monitoring casinos, slot machine facilities and internet gaming for compliance with the Gaming Control Act, 1992, its regulations, licence requirements and other standards and requirements established by the Registrar of Alcohol and Gaming.
- Approving rules of play or changes to rules of play for games of chance conducted and managed by the OLG.
- Through its Investigations and Enforcement Bureau, which is under the direction of the Ontario Provincial Police, maintaining OPP Casino Enforcement operations at all times while the casinos are open to the public.
- Registering suppliers and gaming assistants.
