= Lotto Super 7 =

Canadian lottery

Lotto Super 7 logo

Lotto Super 7 was a national lottery game in Canada, operated by the Interprovincial Lottery Corporation (ILC). It was launched on June 10, 1994, and its last draw was on September 18, 2009.

Drawn every Friday night, the lottery had a guaranteed jackpot of CA$2.5 million, which was carried forward to the next draw if no purchased ticket matched all seven numbers in that draw. The largest jackpot awarded was in May 2002, in which four winning tickets shared a $37.8 million jackpot.

Its final draw date was announced by ILC in March 2009, and in July 2009, ILC announced that it would be replaced by a new game, Lotto Max.

== Organization ==
ILC works with various lottery corporations owned by provincial governments. Profits are shared amongst the various retailers who sell tickets. Retailers receive from the lottery a percentage of the winnings for tickets sold from their shop (the money is not taken from the prize award).

== Prize structure ==
Lotto Super 7 involved picking seven numbers from 1 through 47. The prizes ranged from a free play to the jackpot. Prizes were awarded as follows:

Match	Prize	Odds of Winning per $2 play
7/7	Jackpot (Share of 73% of Pools Fund)	1: 20,963,833
6/7+	Share of 5% of Pools Fund	1: 2,994,883
6/7	Share of 5% of Pools Fund	1: 76,791
5/7	Share of 17% of Pools Fund	1: 1,280
4/7	$10.00	1: 60.6
3/7+	$10.00	1: 65.5
3/7	Free Play	1: 7.3

Note: The fixed prizes for 3 of 7, 3 of 7+ Bonus and 4 of 7 were payable from the Prize Fund (45% of sales). The remainder was the Pools Fund, from which all other pari-mutuel shares of prizes were paid. The "+" symbol denotes matching the bonus number.

== Largest jackpots ==
The largest Super 7 jackpot, and the largest jackpot in Canadian lottery history at the time, was CA$37.8 million, on May 17, 2002.

The prior record for largest Canadian lottery jackpot had been a Lotto 6/49 draw for $26.4 million in 1995, and the Super 7 record was not surpassed until a Lotto 6/49 draw for CA$54.3 million in 2005.

== Purchasing tickets ==
Tickets for Super 7 were sold in each of the five lottery jurisdictions: British Columbia Lottery Corporation, Western Canada Lottery Corporation, Ontario Lottery and Gaming Corporation, Loto-Québec and the Atlantic Lottery Corporation. Tickets were purchased until the cutoff time of 9:00 p.m. ET on Friday nights. For every $2 spent, three selections of seven numbers were given. In addition, each jurisdiction had an add-on regional game.

In the Western Canada Lottery Corporation, the add on game was called the Extra, and offered players a maximum prize of $250,000. The Extra was a seven-digit number. Players won money by matching numbers from the end (i.e., in the number 1234567, matching the 7 won $2, matching 67 won $10, etc.)

In Ontario, the add on game was called Encore. The largest possible prize for Encore (all 7 digits match) was $1 million.

In Quebec, the add on game was called Extra. The largest possible prize for Extra (all 7 digits match) was $500,000.

In Atlantic Canada, the add on game was called Tag. The largest possible prize for Tag (all 6 digits match) was $100,000.

== Advertising ==
The Super 7 radio and TV ads were part of a marketing campaign featuring seven "super heroes". They usually began with the catchphrase "because you can!" and the super hero repeated the phase at the end of the commercial, with the next jackpot amount listed. Commercials usually aired as a pair, such as Relaxo and 2 Weeks Notice Man.

They were:

- 2 Weeks Notice Man
- Relaxo
- The Splurger
- Cosmetica
- Jesse Streets
- Professor Posh
- The Destinator

=== Catchphrases ===
"Unleash the power of the Super 7!"

"Because you can! With this Friday's (jackpot amount) Lotto Super 7 jackpot!" (2007–2009)

== See also ==
- Lotto 6/49
