= Sport Select =

Group of sports betting games

Sport Select, also known as Pro-Line or ProLine in Atlantic Canada, British Columbia, and Ontario, and Mise-O-Jeu in Quebec, is a group of sports betting games offered by Canada's lottery corporations.

Initially created to offer betting primarily on the North American major professional sports leagues, Sport Select has expanded to offer betting on international competitions in soccer, combat sports, and in some areas, Esports. Sport Select (or equivalent) tickets are sold across Canada, through Atlantic Lottery Corporation, Loto-Québec, Ontario Lottery and Gaming Corporation, Western Canada Lottery Corporation, and British Columbia Lottery Corporation. In addition, some provinces are now accepting wagers over the Internet.

== Sport Select games ==
Each province offers versions of these three games under rules similar to those described below:

=== Pro-Line ===
Pro-Line (known as Mise-O-Jeu in Quebec) offers fixed-odds sports betting, where the player must choose between a victory by the home or visiting team, or a "tie" (a push defined as regulation play concluding with a tie or draw, and/or a game whose outcome is decided by a small margin. Overtime is not always considered as part of the result, with exact rules varying by sport). Decimal odds are quoted for individual matches, the odds for each selection being multiplied to calculate the potential payout of the ticket. Some provinces offer Combo Play which does not require all selections to be correct for a payout, but a Combo Play ticket is effectively nothing more than a number of similar, individual Pro-Line tickets rolled into one.

Originally, Pro-Line could only be played as a parlay game, where bettors were required to wager on the outcome of anywhere from two to six (BC and Atlantic) and three to six (Quebec, Ontario and Western Canada) games for a ticket to pay out. After single-game sports betting was legalized in August 2021, the regional lotteries began to change their rules to allow single-game bets on Pro-Line.

=== Point spread ===
Point Spread is similar to those games offered by other bookmakers where bettors are wagering against a quoted point spread. Bettors can make predictions on the outcomes of two to twelve games, depending on the province. The payouts offered vary by province.

=== Over/Under ===
Also known as Total in Quebec, Over/Under is similar to over–under games offered by other bookmakers where bettors are wagering that the number of points scored in each match are over or under the quoted total. Bettors can make predictions on the outcomes of two to twelve games, depending on the province. The payouts offered vary by province.

== Online sportsbooks ==
Most provinces offer legalized online sports betting, although not all of these services are directly linked with their retail counterparts (with BC's being part of PlayNow.com for instance). Amid the 2021 legalization of single-game betting in Canada, the lotteries began to update their platforms to support single-game betting, and allow the use of digital "ticket builders" where players can make their selections via a website or mobile apps, which are then converted into a QR code that is scanned at a lottery retailer to produce the ticket (rather than needing to fill out a paper selection slip).

On August 27, 2021, Ontario Lottery and Gaming introduced ProLine+ as a mobile sportsbook following the legalization of single-game betting in Canada. The retail ProLine was later relaunched in 2022 to include single-game betting and other new features. WCLC updated its Sport Select platform in 2021 as part of its partnership with Scientific Games to similarly add single-game betting and an online ticket builder. In 2024, BCLC discontinued its previous Sports Action games as part of a transition to a new lottery platform, and relaunched retail sports betting under the ProLine brand later that year. BC's ProLine discontinued the use of paper selection slips entirely, exclusively using QR codes, and also signaled an intent to support live odds and integration with the lottery's self-service kiosk network. In January 2026, OLG began a new agreement with Kambi Group to power ProLine and ProLine+, allowing the game to expand the types of games and wagers offered, and also add professional Esports events for the first time.

== Controversy ==
=== Odds ===
In recent years, Sport Select has come under increasingly heavy criticism from Canadian gamblers due to the poor odds it offers (from the gambler's perspective). A private bookmaker licensed in the United Kingdom or Nevada generally maintains an overround (or "vig") of about 110%, meaning the bookmaker can expect to pay out $100 for every $110 that is wagered. In Canada, however, the overround for an individual match in Sport Select odds often exceeds 130%. To make matters worse for the bettor, the parlay requirement compounds the overround - the actual vigorish is a minimum of 160% but can rise to well over 300% (if six selections are made). In jurisdictions such as the United Kingdom where genuine competition is allowed, bookies often pay bonuses for winning parlay bets to help offset the compounded vig. Sport Select does not.

Another controversial frustration for Pro-Line players in Atlantic Canada is the occurrence of Atlantic Lottery (ALC) 'capping' wagering on combinations and, on rare occasion, individual selections. This occurs when a significant amount of wagering is placed within a short span of time, typically on a specific combination of outcomes. The reasoning behind having such caps is to dissuade professional, or 'block', bettors from attempting to take advantage of potential flaws in the posted odds, and thus limits the liability for the corporation on a given combination of outcomes. Typical block betting behaviour involves placing large sums (often thousands of $) on a very small amount of combinations, trying to focus on perceived flaws as much as possible. Ultimately the Pro-Line game is meant to be recreational and not for professionals. Unlike online-only betting operations where all transactions must be submitted by identity verified accounts, Atlantic Lottery operates across a network of retailers where wagers are accepted anonymously, thus making it more susceptible to such 'block' bettors. The capping of combinations serves to limit pro-betting while keeping all outcomes open for betting, in any other combination. If a combination of outcomes is capped, any subsequent transaction submitted to the system attempting to wager on this particular combination is rejected. This can be an annoyance to non-professional (casual) bettors legitimately trying to wager on a capped combination, but experienced bettors have come to understand the reasoning and adjust their wagers accordingly.

Though most experts agree that the odds offered on Sport Select are such that even the sharpest punter would have no hope of making a profit in the long term, some have. See, for instance, the 2007 Tax Court of Canada case R. v. Leblanc, in which two brothers netted $5.5 million on $50 million in bets over five years. The Tax Court ruled the profit was not taxable.

=== Ties ===
While ties are a common in soccer and used to be common in ice hockey as well, unlike what would be the case with most bookmakers the rules of Sport Select provide for betting on "ties" in nearly every sport including football, basketball and in some provinces baseball, even though ties are never allowed in basketball or baseball and are rare in football. Consequently, Sport Select mandates that any game decided by five points or less in basketball, three points or less in football or one run in baseball (where applicable) is declared a "tie". Furthermore, when the NHL introduced shootouts in for the 2005–06 season the lottery corporations (in contrast to most bookmakers) quickly ruled that shootout results would not count, specifically so they could keep offering "ties" in hockey. In Ontario, a hockey game that goes to a shootout counts as both a Tie and a Visitor or Home win, depending on the outcome. The rule is loathed by most Canadian gamblers because the size of the winning margin often means little to the teams on the field/court. Many bettors believe the rule's true purpose is to confuse gamblers and allow for larger vigs.

=== NBA ===
Wagering on NBA games was an issue when Toronto and Vancouver were being considered for NBA expansion franchises, due to strict league rules at the time which prohibited gambling. The Toronto Raptors and Vancouver Grizzlies began play in the league in 1995 only after the provincial lottery corporations agreed to stop offering wagering on all NBA games. As part of the agreement, the Raptors paid $5 million in its first three years and $1 million annually afterwards to its charitable foundation to compensate the Ontario provincial lottery corporation for its loss of revenue.

When the Grizzlies relocated to Memphis in 2001, British Columbia resumed allowing wagering on NBA games. In 2010, it was revealed that the Ontario Lottery Gaming Corporation and the Raptors were in negotiations to return wagering on NBA games to the province. In September 2016, it was announced that an agreement had been reached between the parties to allow betting on NBA games on Pro-Line in Ontario to resume beginning with the 2016–17 season. The move is projected to generate $5–10 million in profit for the province.
