= Daily Grand =

Canadian lottery game

Daily Grand (also known as Grande vie in Quebec) is a Canadian lottery game coordinated by the Interprovincial Lottery Corporation, as one of the country's three national lottery games, alongside Lotto 6/49 and Lotto Max. Sales began on October 18, 2016, and the first draw was held on October 20, 2016. The game was not launched in Atlantic Canada until 2017.

Winning numbers are chosen from five main numbers from 1 to 49, and a "Grand Number" from 1 to 7. The Grand Number is drawn from a separate pool and may be equal to one of the five main numbers. It is matched separately for determining prize payouts. A single board costs $3, and the game's top prize is an annuity of $1,000 a day (with a $7,000,000 lump sum option). Draws are held twice a week on Monday and Thursday nights.

== Prize structure ==
Match	Prize	Chance of Winning on a $3 play
5/5 + Grand Number	$1,000 a day for life ($7 million lump sum)*	1 in 13,348,188
5/5	$25,000 a year for life ($500,000 lump sum)*	1 in 2,224,698
4/5 + Grand Number	$1,000	1 in 60,674
4/5	$500	1 in 10,112
3/5 + Grand Number	$100	1 in 1,411
3/5	$20	1 in 235
2/5 + Grand Number	$10	1 in 101
1/5 + Grand Number	$4	1 in 20
Grand Number	Free play	1 in 7
Any prize	-	1 in 6.8

A lump sum option is available on the top two prizes, and is the only option if there are multiple winners. The annuity will last for the remainder of the winner's life, with a guaranteed period of 20 years (a beneficiary is chosen to receive the remainder of the 20-year minimum balance if the winner dies before the 20 years passes).

== Promotion ==
As part of a promotional effort for Daily Grand, the British Columbia Lottery Corporation announced a contest in which entrants would be asked how they would use the grand prize. The winners were to receive $1,000 prizes, and have to film themselves using the money.

== See also ==
- Powerball, a U.S. lottery game with a similar structure
