= Interprovincial Lottery Corporation =

Canadian lottery organization

Interprovincial Lottery Corporation (ILC)
- Founded: 1976
- Headquarters: 40 Holly Street, 6th floor, Toronto, Ontario, Canada
- Products: Lotteries
- Owner: partnership of provincial lottery corporations

The Interprovincial Lottery Corporation (ILC) is a Canadian organization that operates national lottery games. It was established in 1976. As of 2019, it is owned jointly by the ten provincial governments of Canada. Since 1982, it has administered the Lotto 6/49. It also administers Lotto Max and Daily Grand.

ILC's headquarters are located in Toronto, Ontario. The ILC previously ran the Lotto Super 7 and Millionaire Life.

Each provincial organization is responsible for marketing the national games within its own jurisdiction, and revenues are returned to each province in proportion to generated sales.

== Member organizations ==
- Atlantic Lottery Corporation - serves Newfoundland and Labrador, Nova Scotia, Prince Edward Island and New Brunswick.
- British Columbia Lottery Corporation
- Ontario Lottery and Gaming Corporation
- Loto-Québec
- Western Canada Lottery Corporation - serves Manitoba, Saskatchewan, Alberta, Nunavut, Northwest Territories, and Yukon.

== Games administered ==
- Lotto 6/49
- Lotto Max
- Daily Grand

=== Former games ===
- Lotto Super 7
- Millionnaire Life
