= Alcohol and Gaming Commission of Ontario =

Canadian provincial regulatory agency

- French: Commission des alcools et des jeux de l’Ontario
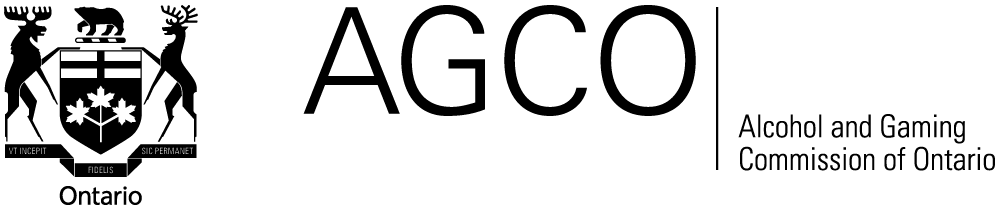

Agency overview
- Formed: February 23, 1998
- Preceding agencies: Liquor Licence Board; Gaming Control Commission
- Type: Crown agency
- Jurisdiction: Government of Ontario
- Headquarters: 90 Sheppard Avenue East; Suite 200-300; Toronto, Ontario; M2N 0A4
- Minister responsible: Doug Downey, Attorney General
- Agency executive: Dave Forestell, Chair
- Key document: Alcohol and Gaming Commission of Ontario Act
- Website: agco.ca

The Alcohol and Gaming Commission of Ontario (AGCO) is a Crown regulatory agency responsible for the regulation of the alcohol, gaming, horse racing, and cannabis retail sectors in the Canadian province of Ontario. The AGCO reports to the Attorney General of Ontario.

== History ==
The AGCO was established on February 23, 1998, by the Government of Ontario under the Alcohol and Gaming Regulation and Public Protection Act of 1996. This Act transferred responsibility for the Liquor Licence Act and the Gaming Control Act to the newly formed AGCO. As a result, the Government of Ontario subsequently passed legislation dissolving the Liquor Licence Board of Ontario, the Racing Commission of Ontario, and the Gaming Control Commission.

On April 1, 2016, the AGCO assumed responsibility for regulating horse racing under the Horse Racing Licence Act, 2015. With the legalization of cannabis in Canada, the AGCO assumed responsibility for regulating private cannabis retail stores under the Cannabis Licence Act, 2018 on October 17, 2018.

== iGaming Ontario ==
On July 6, 2021, the Government of Ontario established iGaming Ontario (iGO) as a subsidiary of the AGCO to oversee and regulate online gaming operations offered by private gaming companies (also known as operators). iGO opened the iGaming market on April 4, 2022, and operators became eligible to offer their games to players in Ontario. iGO became a standalone agency on May 12, 2025.

== Responsibilities ==
The responsibilities of the AGCO include the administration of the:

- Liquor Licence and Control Act, 2019
- Gaming Control Act, 1992
- Horse Racing Licence Act, 2015
- Cannabis Licence Act, 2018 (Ontario)

The AGCO also administers sections of the:

- Charity Lottery Licensing Order-in-Council 1413/08
