= Ontario Charitable Gaming Association =

The Ontario Charitable Gaming Association (OCGA) was established as a not-for-profit in 1997 to represent the interests of charities and non-for-profits that fundraise through regulated charitable gaming in Ontario, Canada. Their membership consists of thousands of registered charities and non-profits such as health and social services organizations, schools, and service clubs.
