= Western Canada Lottery Corporation =

Nonprofit organization

- Type: Non-profit
- Founded: 1974
- Headquarters: Winnipeg, Manitoba, Canada
- Products: Lotteries and Gaming-related activities
- Website: www.wclc.com

The Western Canada Lottery Corporation (WCLC) is a Canadian non-profit organization founded in 1974 that operates lottery and gaming-related activities for its members, the governments of Alberta, Saskatchewan and Manitoba. Yukon, the Northwest Territories and Nunavut participate as associate members. WCLC works in conjunction with the Alberta Gaming, Liquor and Cannabis Commission (AGLC), Sask Lotteries (which is operated by Sask Sport under the oversight of Lotteries and Gaming Saskatchewan), Manitoba Liquor & Lotteries Corporation, Lotteries Yukon and Sport North Lottery Authority. In conjunction with the Interprovincial Lottery Corporation, WCLC offers Canada's highest payout lotteries, Lotto 6/49, Lotto Max (which replaced Lotto Super 7 in September 2009), and Daily Grand.

In the late 1970s through the mid-1980s, WCLC produced a weekly televised drawing for the Western Express lottery, Winsday, which aired regionally on CTV via its western Canadian affiliates. Hosted by sportscaster Don Wittman, Winsday alternated between showing the draws (several were held each week) and featuring interviews and regional profiles.

== Games offered ==
WCLC operates various draw-style lottery games through retailers across the Prairies and Territories under the LOTTO SPOT brand.

=== Jackpot draws ===
- Daily Grand (national)
- Lotto 6/49 (national)
- Lotto Max (national)
- Western 6/49
- Western Max

=== Daily draws ===
- Pick 2
- Pick 3
- Pick 4
- Keno
- Extra
- Lightning Lotto
- Poker Lotto

=== Sports Select ===
- Pro-Line
- Over Under
- Point Spread
- Pools
- Futures

=== Previous games ===
- Lotto Super 7
- PayDay
- The Provincial
- Lotto West
- Western Express (now the scratch card-based The Western)
