= Ontario Lottery and Gaming Corporation =

Canadian provincial Crown corporation

- Type: Crown corporation
- Industry: Lottery and gambling
- Founded: February 1975
- Headquarters: Sault Ste. Marie and Toronto, Ontario, Canada
- Key people: Jim Warren (Chair of the Board); Duncan Hannay (President and CEO)
- Products: Lotteries, casinos, bingo, Sports betting
- Revenue: $9.2 billion CAD (2022-23)
- Owner: Government of Ontario
- Website: www.olg.ca

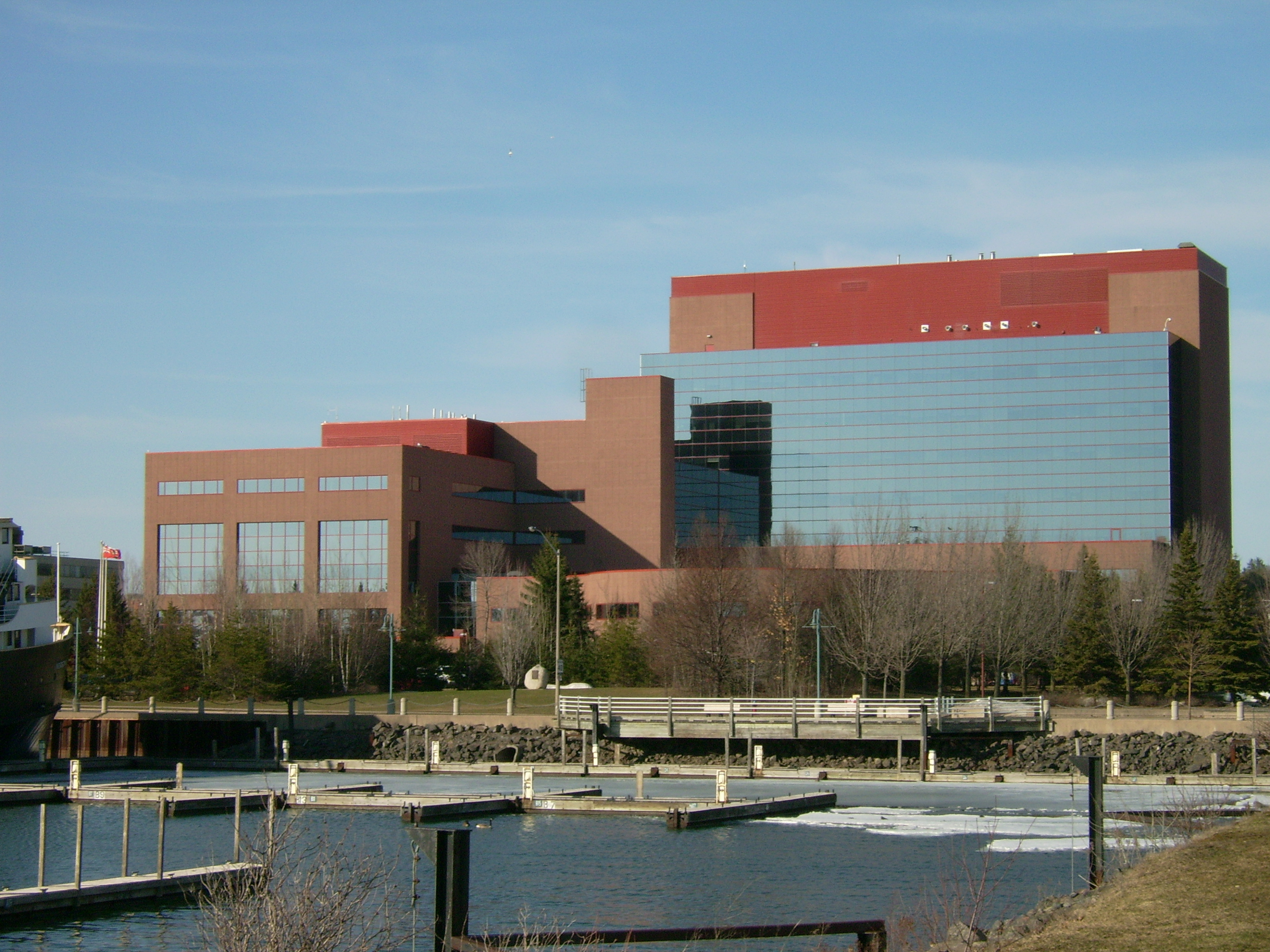
OLG headquarters in Sault Ste. Marie

The Ontario Lottery and Gaming Corporation (OLG) is a Crown corporation owned by the Government of Ontario, Canada.

OLG conducts and manages gaming on behalf of the province of Ontario, including: lottery, casinos, electronic bingo, and its internet gaming site. Private service providers operate most of OLG casinos. OLG continues to integrate horse racing into its games, including the administration of ongoing funding.

It was created in April 2000 when the Ontario Lottery Corporation (OLC) was merged with the Ontario Casino Corporation (OCC), established in 1994. Prior to 2006, the combined entity was known in short form as the OLGC (or SLJO in French). OLG employs approximately 1,400 individuals in Sault Ste. Marie and the GTA offices. There are approximately 9,800 retailers operating more than 10,000 lottery terminals across the province.

OLG's prize centre is located in Toronto, while the corporation's primary headquarters is located in Sault Ste. Marie. Whereas OLG is responsible for and operates a variety of gaming services, the Alcohol and Gaming Commission of Ontario (AGCO) regulates casino gaming. OLG reports through its board of directors to the Minister of Tourism, Culture and Gaming.

OLG operates a self-exclusion program for people with gambling addictions, although the efficacy of the program has attracted criticism.

== History ==
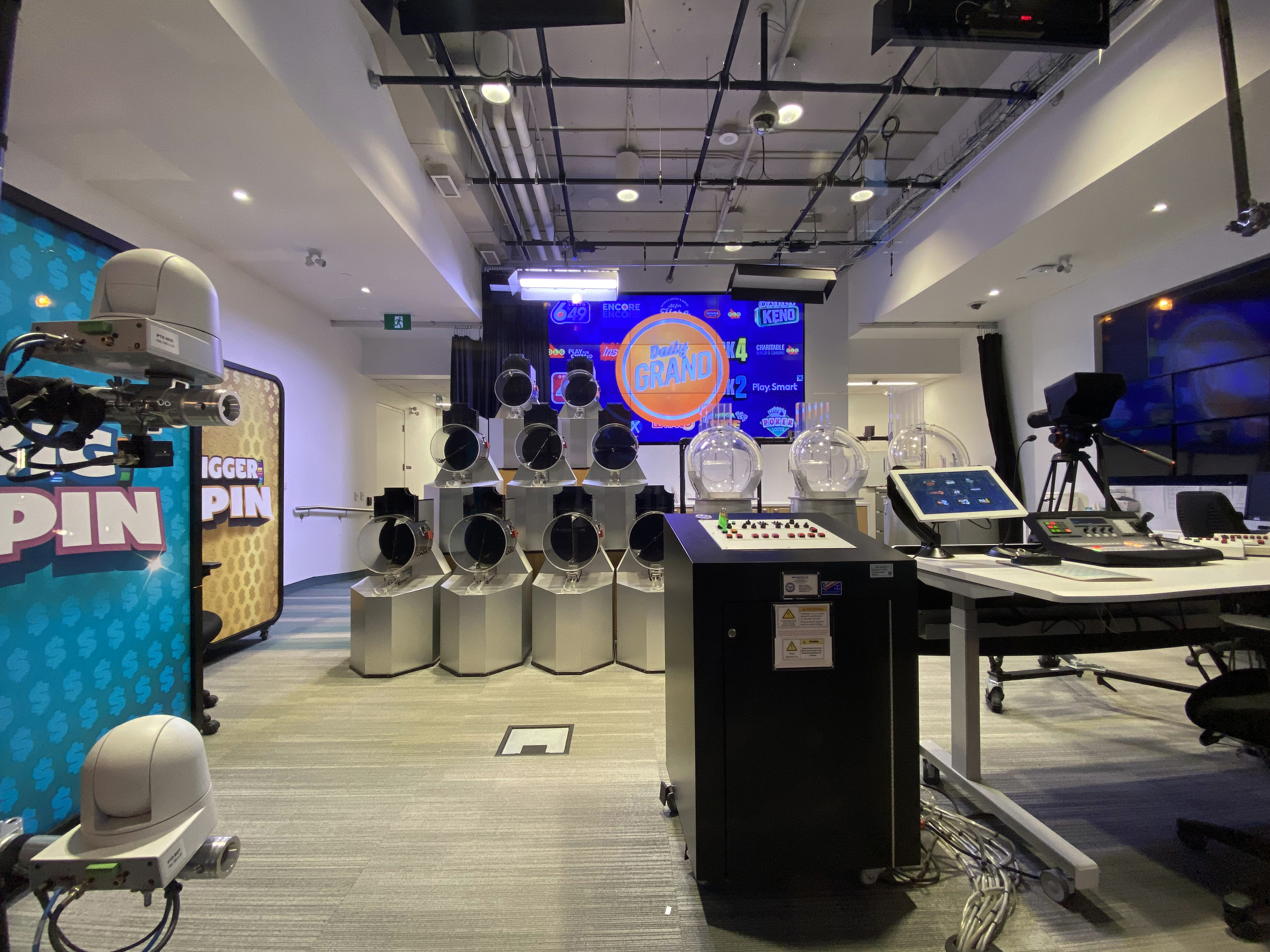
OLG Prize Centre in Toronto.

The Ontario Lottery Corporation was created in February 1975 under the Ontario Lottery Corporation Act, 1975 (repealed in 1999 and replaced with the current Ontario Lottery and Gaming Corporation Act). Wintario was the first lottery game offered by the fledgling OLC on April 3, 1975, and the first drawing took place on May 15, 1975. The product was discontinued in late 1996 after awarding over CA$1.1 billion in winnings.

== Divisions ==
OLG has five business divisions:

=== Lottery products ===
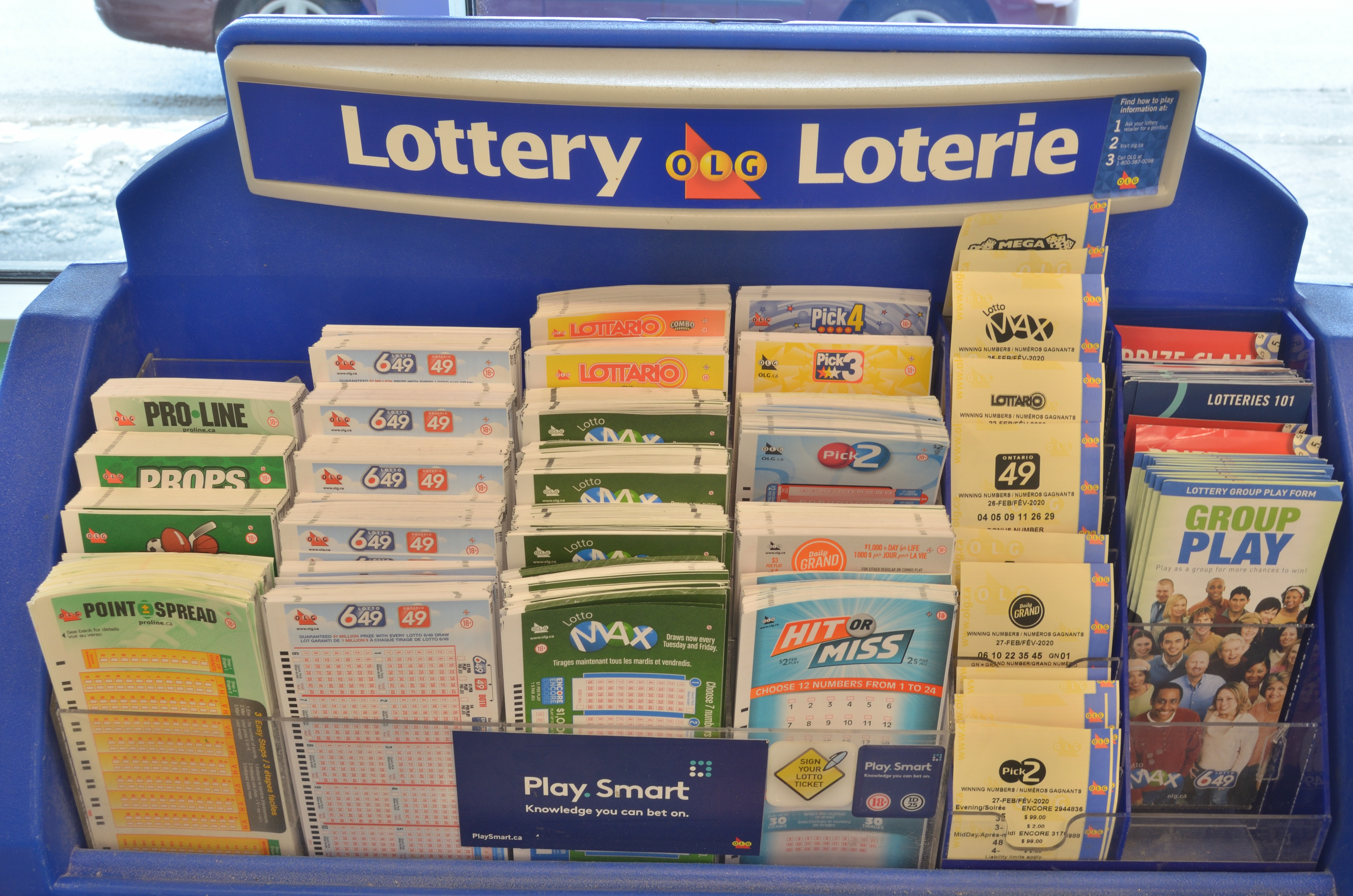
OLG lottery tickets

OLG operates nine draw-style lottery games through retailers across the province.

==== Jackpot draws ====
- Daily Grand (national)
- Lotto 6/49 (national)
- Lotto Max (national)
- Ontario 49
- Lottario

==== Daily draws ====
- Pick 2
- Pick 3
- Pick 4
- Daily Keno
- Encore
- Lightning Lotto
- Poker Lotto
- Mega Dice Lotto
- Wheel of Fortune Lotto

==== Sports games ====
- Pro-Line
- Pro-Line+
- Pro-Picks
- Point-Spread

Lotto 6/49, Lotto Max and Daily Grand are operated across Canada by the Interprovincial Lottery Corporation. The corporation also offers instant scratch games under the brand Instant Games, and sports games under the brands Pro-Line, Point-Spread and Pro-Picks.

==== Lotto Advance ====
OLG used to offer a subscription-based lottery service called Lotto Advance for Lotto 6/49; the service was discontinued on September 7, 2013.

=== Casinos ===
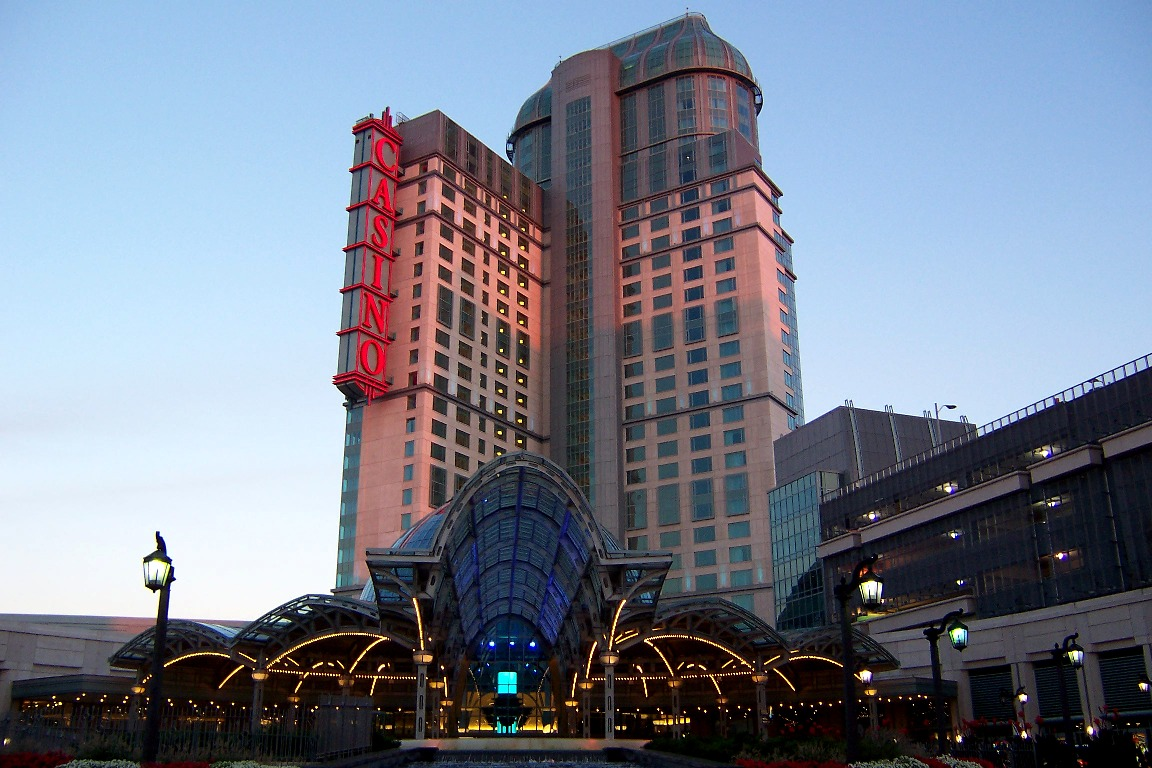
Niagara Fallsview Casino Resort – Facade – At Sundown

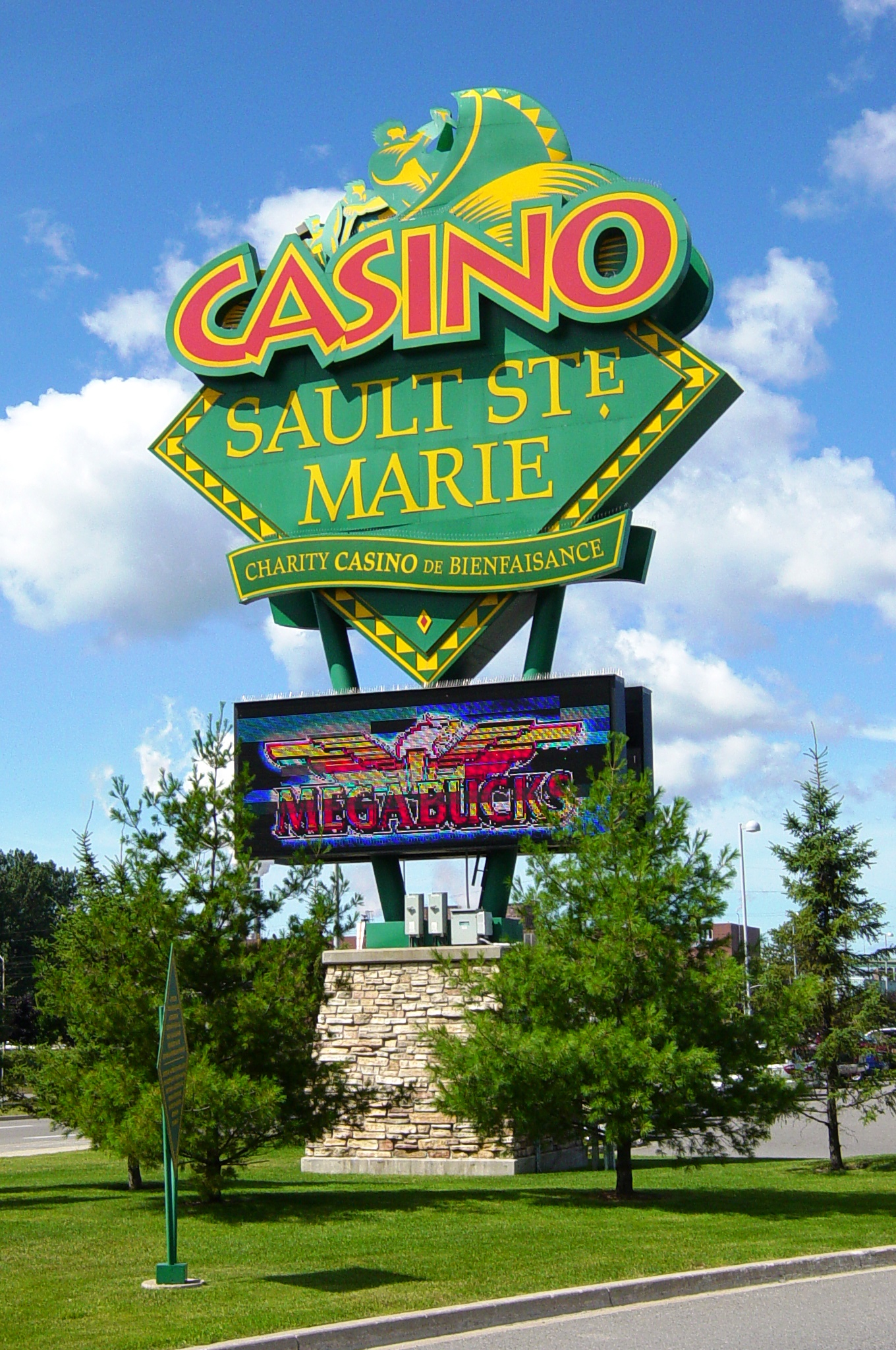
Signage at OLG Casino Sault Ste. Marie

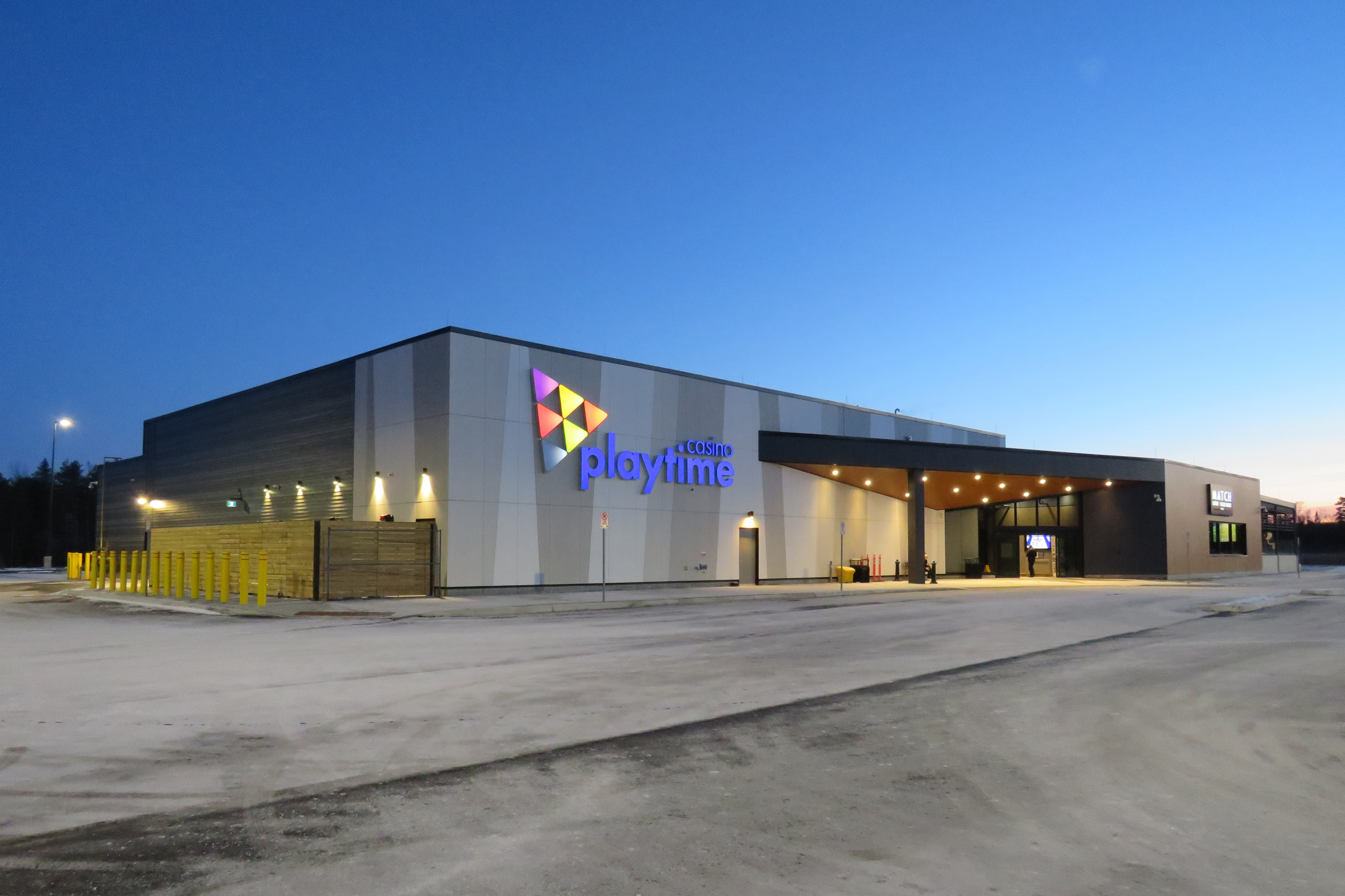
Wasaga Playtime Casino at dusk

OLG owns and manages casinos. Most of these which have private operators, notably Great Canadian Entertainment and Gateway Casinos.

- Shorelines Casino Belleville
- Elements Casino Brantford
- Cascades Casino Chatham
- Great Blue Heron Casino
- Casino Niagara
- Niagara Fallsview Casino Resort
- Shorelines Casino Peterborough
- Pickering Casino Resort
- Starlight Casino Point Edward
- Casino Rama
- Gateway Casino Sault Ste. Marie
- Shorelines Casino Thousand Islands
- Gateway Casino Thunder Bay
- Caesars Windsor
- Wasaga Playtime Casino

=== Slots ===
OLG operates slot machine facilities at racetracks across Ontario. They are located at:

- Casino Ajax
- Gateway Casino Clinton
- Elements Casino Flamboro
- Gateway Casino Innisfil
- Elements Casino Grand River
- Playtime Casino Hanover
- Shorelines Slots Kawartha Downs
- Gateway Casino London
- Elements Casino Mohawk
- Rideau Carleton Casino
- Gateway Casino Sudbury
- Casino Woodbine
- Gateway Casino Woodstock

Slots at racetracks generated $300 million annually for the racetracks until 2012 when the program ended. However, threatened with the closure of numerous tracks, the Ontario government extended the plan while it determined its future direction in gaming facilities.

=== Charitable bingo & gaming ===
OLG oversees the operations of charity bingo and gaming centres across the province, where 25% of revenue is used to support local charities within their respective areas. These facilities initially operated primarily as bingo parlors; amid declines in revenues due to aging demographics and Ontario's smoking ban, OLG began to institute a modernization program in the mid-2010s to make them more appealing to young adult audiences. These efforts included the deployment of electronic terminals in bingo halls (allowing customers to purchase and play their bingo cards digitally, or play digital "Play on Demand" games), and "Tap 'N Play" (formerly "TapTix"), a type of video lottery terminal that utilizes slot machine reels as an entertainment display for legal lottery games such as bingo and pull-tabs (similarly to "Class II" slot machines used at tribal casinos in the United States).

== Collections ==
Prizes under $999.90 can be collected directly from a retailer that has a lottery terminal in store. This is subject to cash availability. People can collect bigger prizes by visiting an OLG Casino or Slot facility. This can be done by mailing the ticket to the OLG Prize Centre or by visiting the OLG Prize Centre in Toronto. When claiming the prize at the OLG Prize Centre, the prizewinner must have valid government identification as well as providing a signature. The ticket will be double-checked in case of fraud.

If the prize money is $5000 or more the terminal will freeze and OLG will be contacted. OLG will inform the winner directly of how to claim their prize.

If the prize money is $10,000 or more, the process of claiming your prize will involve an interview and an investigator validating the authority of the ticket. Once approved, there will be a picture taken of you with your cheque.

OLG publicizes all winners of $1,000 or more on their website.

There is a time period of exactly one year from the draw date to claim Ontario lottery games.

== Controversies ==
=== Retailer fraud ===
On October 25, 2006, the CBC program The Fifth Estate aired an investigative report on lottery retailers winning major prizes, focusing on the ordeal of 82-year-old Bob Edmonds. His $250,000 winning Encore ticket was stolen by a convenience store clerk when he went to have his ticket checked in 2001. For the next four years, OLG ignored Edmonds' inquiries after the clerk and her husband were falsely named the rightful winners. Later, when the couple was arrested for fraud, OLG refused to return his winnings, maintaining that it wasn't their responsibility that they had been tricked; in 2004, a judge disagreed and forced OLG to give Edmonds his money. They did so, on the condition that Edmonds sign a confidentiality agreement, so that he would never tell the press about certain details of the ordeal. Also, The Fifth Estate uncovered internal OLG memos where several employees admitted they believed Edmonds' story. Immediately following the broadcast, Edmonds received a call from OLG's president, Duncan Brown, who apologized and claimed he was ashamed about how his staff treated Edmonds. OLG later released Edmonds from the confidentiality agreement.

In another case, Toronto variety store owner Hafiz Malik had defrauded four school board employees out of their $5.7 million prize. He was arrested after the original ticket owners filed a complaint with the police. The OPP seized or froze over $5-million of Malik's assets, including bank accounts, three cars, and a home in Mississauga. OLG has since awarded the rightful winners the prize plus interest.

The report by The Fifth Estate added that over 200 lottery retailers in Ontario have won major prizes from 1999 to 2006. A statistician featured in the report, Jeff Rosenthal, calculated that the chance that this would occur purely out of luck is one in a "trillion trillion trillion trillion" (or quindecillion). OLG did have a policy on insider wins, but it was rarely enforced during that period. Provincial ombudsman André Marin released a report stating that Ontario store owners and their families claimed about $100 million in lottery wins between 1999 and 2006, with tens of millions of fraudulent claims being ignored by the OLGC.

OLG has since mandated new security measures to protect lottery customers, notably with customer-facing displays when tickets are checked, as well as special music played with a winning ticket. As of January 28, 2008, lottery retailers are required to ensure that tickets are signed. There is a signature box shown on the front of all online lottery tickets.

=== Lottery ticket recalls ===
==== 2007 Super Bingo recall ====
In March 2007, OLG announced that it had recalled over 1,000,000 scratch and win tickets. The "Super Bingo" series of tickets were removed from retail stores after it was announced that a customer made the claim that he could visually tell which tickets were winners. It was the largest recall ever of a lottery ticket in Canada, and were prompted in part from greater media scrutiny regarding ongoing fraud investigations.

==== 2009 Fruit Scratch recall ====
In January 2009, OLG announced it has recalled over 1,000 scratch and win tickets. The "Fruit Scratch" series of lottery tickets were removed from retail stores after it was discovered that dozens of lottery tickets were reportedly misprinted. Up to 150 of the misprinted tickets were reportedly purchased at eight stores across Southern Ontario one week before the recall was issued. OLG has since reached an undisclosed settlement with a 27-year-old Thomas Noftall from Brampton, Ontario, who was mistakenly told that he might have won $135,000 on a misprinted lottery ticket.

=== Slot machine recall ===
In February 2007, it was discovered that 87 slot machines at Provincially run casinos were displaying subliminal messages on slot machine screens to players. An image of a winning symbol combination was shown quickly before or during the simulated spinning of the slot machine reels. The manufacturer, Konami, provided a software update for the machines.

=== Aftermath ===
In the wake of these controversies, the provincial government ordered Duncan Brown to be relieved of his position as OLG chief on 21 March 2007. This was not public knowledge until two days later, when Brown's dismissal took effect. David Caplan, Ontario's minister responsible for OLG, intended to announce this firing on 26 March following the release of a report on OLG's situation by the provincial ombudsman André Marin. Marin criticized the OLG for being more fixated on profits than the integrity of games after a disproportionate number of lottery retailers or their families claimed winning tickets.

=== Exclusion program inefficiency ===
Casino clients who recognize that they have a gambling addiction can benefit from the self-exclusion program operated by the OLG. An investigation conducted by the CBC's The Fifth Estate (TV series) in late 2017 led to concerns as to whether the program is effective. According to a CBC article, "Gambling addicts ... said that while on the ... self-exclusion list, they entered OLG properties on a regular basis" in spite of the facial recognition technology in place at the casinos. As well, a CBC journalist who tested the system found that he was able to enter casinos and gamble on four distinct occasions, in spite of being registered and photographed for the program. Previous studies in other countries have also confirmed that self-exclusion programs can be difficult to enforce.

Some experts maintain that casinos, in general, arrange for self-exclusion programs as a public relations measure without actually helping those with problem gambling issues. A campaign of this type "deflects attention away from problematic products and industries," according to Natasha Dow Schull, a cultural anthropologist at New York University and author of the book Addiction by Design. Other experts believe that self-enforcement is part of the problem gambler's own responsibility, as one aspect of any therapy program. "Without such acceptance of responsibility, much of the effectiveness of self-exclusion programs would be lost", as one explained.

As OLG literature confirms, the enforcement by a casino cannot be expected to be 100% foolproof. "If you attempt to re-enter a gaming facility in Ontario, your image may be captured by cameras and you may be automatically detected by security." An OLG spokesman provided this response when questioned by the CBC after the investigation of the self-enforcement program had been completed: "We provide supports to self-excluders by training our staff, by providing disincentives, by providing facial recognition, by providing our security officers to look for players. No one element is going to be foolproof because it is not designed to be foolproof".

== Chair of the Board of Directors of the OLGC ==
- Jim Warren 2021-present
- Gail Beggs 2021
- Peter Deeb 2019-2021
- George L. Cooke 2016–2019
- Phil Olsson 2013–2016
- Peter Wallace 2013 (interim)
- Paul Godfrey 2010–2013
- Michael Gough 2006–2009
- Timothy Reid 2004–2006
- Stanley Sadinsky 2003–2004
- Ron Barbaro 2000–2003 (and CEO)

== President and CEO of the OLGC ==
- Duncan Hannay 2020–present
- Stephen Rigby 2015–2020
- Rod Phillips 2011–2014
- Tom Marinelli 2010–2011 (interim)
- Kelly McDougald 2007–2009
- Duncan Brown 2004–2007
- Brian Wood 2003–2004 (interim)

== Chair and CEO of the OLC ==
- Ron Barbaro 1998–2000
- Garth Manness 1995–1998
- Ian Nielsen-Jones 1988–1995
- D Norman Morris 1980–1988
- Harvey McCullough, QC, 1975–1977 – as chairman
- E. Marshall Pollock, QC, 1975–1980 – as founding Managing Director & CEO of OLC
