= Charity gambling =

Form of charity fundraising

Charity gambling is a "form of incentivized giving" where a charity (or a group of charities), rather than a municipality or private casino, oversees gambling activities such as bingo, roulette, lottery, and slot machines and uses the proceeds to further its charitable aims.

== Characteristics ==
Charity lotteries tend to:

- Be privately operated without political interference
- Not retain private profits (i.e., the primary aim is to raise funds for the charity)
- Donate "a substantial part" of the funds to the charity (according to the Association of Charity Lotteries in the European Union, "ideally, the operational costs of the lottery do not exceed 20% of turnover, with the remaining 80% equally divided between donations to charities (40%) and prize money (40%)")
- Support a charity's overall objectives, rather than specific projects or activities
- Provide long-term funding prospects as a "reliable partner"

The Association of Charity Lotteries in Europe, founded in 2007, promotes this model and has estimated that allowing private charity lotteries to operate across Europe could raise substantial additional funds for civil society organisations.

As a form of incentivized giving, supporters are rewarded, which makes it more likely to draw donations from those who may not have otherwise. Furthermore, charities can add these donators to their database and reach out to them in other fundraising capacities. Philanthropists like this method of fundraising because it is a "predictable way of generating income".

== By country ==
=== Australia ===
In Australia, regulations relating to charity fund-raising varies among the different states and territories, for example, in South Australia, Consumer and Business Services administers the state Lottery and Gaming Act 1936, which regulates lotteries and bingo run by charities. Under that Act, fundraiser lotteries above a set prize threshold and bingo sessions above a low proceeds limit require authorisation, while smaller activities may be exempt.

=== Canada ===
In Canada, charitable gaming is regulated at the provincial level, as with all other forms of gambling. In Ontario, charitable gaming is overseen by the Ontario Lottery and Gaming Corporation (OLG), including bingo and gaming halls that donate a quarter of their gambling revenue to local charities.

=== United Kingdom ===
In the UK, lotteries are permitted provided they raise money for charities. By law, the charity must receive at least 20% of the value of the lottery ticket. These lotteries are sold in competition with the National Lottery but operate under tighter regulations. For example, a lottery run for charity can have a maximum jackpot of £200,000 whereas the National Lottery has no maximum. Charity lotteries in Britain are regulated by the Gambling Commission, with large society lotteries requiring an operating licence and smaller ones registering with the local authority. Society lotteries generated more than £1 billion in gross gambling yield in 2024/25, of which about £484.6 million went to good causes. Charities running lotteries and raffles are also expected to follow guidance issued by the Fundraising Regulator.

The Gambling Act 2005 permitted the sale of charity lottery tickets through vending machines. Following the Act, companies including Gamestec Plc and Tabboxx (UK) Ltd introduced lottery vending machines in pubs and other venues across the United Kingdom. In 2012, Tabboxx partnered with the Dame Kelly Holmes Legacy Trust to launch a lottery aimed at raising funds for sports programmes for disadvantaged young people.

== In popular culture ==
In series 2, episode 22 of The Office, Michael Scott hosts a charity gambling night in a warehouse.

== See also ==
- Big Lottery Fund
- Nationale Postcode Loterij (Netherlands)
- Novamedia
- People's Postcode Lottery (UK)
- Philippine Lottery Draw
