= Responsible gambling =

Set of social responsibility initiatives by the gambling industry

In gambling, the phrase "responsible gambling" is a slogan, widely described as oxymoronic and euphemistic, used by casinos and the gambling industry.

Writing for the Sydney Morning Herald, Simon Castles ridiculed the phrase "gamble responsibly", opining the phrase as essentially, "do something irresponsible responsibly". This apparent self-contradiction, Castle writes, bears resemblance to doublespeak: language that deliberately obscures, disguises, distorts, or reverses the meaning of words, a Orwellian concept originated from dystopian novel Nineteen Eighty-Four. Castles also notes that, the apparent claimed purpose of the term seems disconnected to what the gambling industry is doing.

Anthony Crupi of Sportico described the term's use as "nonsense" and "absurd", comparing it to the sarcastic statement "Local Heroin Kingpin Launches Clean Needle Exchange Program".
