= Lotto Max =

Canadian lottery game

Lotto Max logo

Lotto Max is a Canadian lottery game coordinated by the Interprovincial Lottery Corporation, as one of the country's three national lottery games. Introduced on September 19, 2009, with its first draw occurring on September 25, 2009, the game replaced Lotto Super 7. As of May 2019, Lotto Max drawings are held every Tuesday and Friday.

Each drawing is played for a main jackpot of up to $90 million. Once it reaches $50 million, drawings for supplemental $1 million prizes known as "MaxMillions" are added on each drawing until the main jackpot is won, after which it is reset to $10 million plus the value of any unclaimed MaxMillions prizes.

The launch of Lotto Max was successful, attracting higher revenue in its first 10 months of operation than Super 7 did in its best year of sales. A representative of the OLG attributed Lotto Max's popularity to the size of its total prize pools, and the perception of consumers that the MaxMillions system increased the probability that they could win a major prize. In May 2019, the game introduced major changes, including adding a second weekly drawing on Tuesdays, a higher maximum jackpot, a 7/50 number matrix, and two additional prize tiers. In April 2026, the game introduced further changes, including a 7/52 number matrix, a higher maximum jackpot, and new $100,000 "MaxPlus" prizes on each draw.

== Gameplay ==
Seven numbers are selected from a field of 52 numbers, along with a bonus number. A single line of seven numbers costs $6, and each purchased line also includes three additional lines of quick picks. Loto-Quebec has a "Personal Selections" slip allowing the player to select all three sets of numbers themselves, also at a cost of $6. If a ticket matches all seven numbers on the main draw, the jackpot prize of at least $10 million is won. The main jackpot is capped at $90 million.

Alongside the main jackpot, each drawing also contains auxiliary prizes. When the main jackpot reaches $50 million, "MaxMillions" prizes of $1 million each are added. MaxMillions prizes are carried over until they are won, and additional MaxMillions prizes are added for each week a main jackpot of at least $50 million is not won. Beginning with the April 14, 2026 draw, each drawing also includes "MaxPlus" prizes of $100,000 each for every $1 million in the main jackpot (e.g. if the jackpot is $10 million, there will be 10 MaxPlus prizes). MaxMillions and MaxPlus drawings only award prizes on an exact match, and do not award secondary prizes. Once the main jackpot is won, unclaimed MaxMillions prizes, if any, are placed in the main jackpot on top of the $10 million minimum.

The main jackpot was initially capped at $50 million. The July 17, 2015 draw increased this cap to $60 million. Beginning with the May 14, 2019 draw, the field of numbers increased from 49 to 50 (changing the odds of a jackpot win to 1 in 33 million), the main jackpot cap was increased to $70 million, new prizes were added for matching 4 or 5 numbers and the bonus number, and the game added a second weekly draw on Tuesdays. Organizers stated these changes would help Lotto Max reach higher jackpots more often. At the same time, Lotto Max switched to using a random number generator for the main draw rather than lottery machines. Beginning with the September 10, 2024 draw, the main jackpot cap further increased to $80 million.

Beginning with the April 14, 2026 draw, the field of numbers increased to 52, the main jackpot cap increased further to $90 million, and each drawing began to include auxiliary "MaxPlus" prizes of $100,000 each for every million in that draw's main jackpot. The price of a single line of seven numbers increased to $6, but includes three additional lines of quick picks instead of only two.

== Organization ==
The game is administered by the Interprovincial Lottery Corporation, a consortium of the five regional lottery corporations in Canada.

Each of these corporations operate a regional add-on games that, for an extra $1 each, can be added to a Lotto Max ticket. This "spiel" game (named "Tag", "Encore", or "Extra" depending on the region), adds a 6- or 7-digit number, or a set of 4 numbers to the ticket, with a top prize of $100,000 if all six digits are matched, $500,000 if all four numbers matched in any order (British Columbia) or $250,000 to $1,000,000 depending on the region for a seven-number match ($1,000,000 in Ontario and Quebec; $250,000 in the Western Canada region of Alberta, Saskatchewan, Manitoba, and the territories).

The Atlantic Lottery Corporation offers a second $1 add-on known as "Twist", which adds lines of quick picks that can be matched against the winning numbers of the main drawing for supplemental prizes. Matching seven numbers, or six numbers plus the bonus number, awards $100,000. On selected draws, the prizes awarded by the Twist feature may also be multiplied as part of promotions.

Similarly to Lotto 6/49, Loto-Québec and the Western Canada Lottery Corporation also run local versions of Lotto Max, known as Québec Max and Western Max respectively. These draws are held on the same night as each Lotto Max draw and have similar payouts, but with a fixed jackpot of $2,000,000, and additional drawings for a pool of 14 $1,000,000 prizes on each draw, similarly to MaxMillions. Lotto Max selection slips offer the ability for players to choose between Lotto Max, the regional game, or to play both games using the same numbers(except in Western Max, which still using only 50 numbers, and using an own selection slip instead.).

== Prize structure ==
| Match | Prize | Chance of winning on a $6 play |
|---|---|---|
| 7/7 | Jackpot win or share of $10M to $90M | 1 in 33,446,140 |
| 6/7 + bonus number | Share of 18.5% of pool's fund | 1 in 4,778,020 |
| 6/7 | Share of 18.85% of pool's fund | 1 in 108,591 |
| 5/7 + bonus number | Share of 12.25% of pool's fund | 1 in 36,197 |
| 5/7 | Share of 27.5% of pool's fund | 1 in 1,684 |
| 4/7 + bonus number | Share of 22.9% of pool's fund | 1 in 1,010 |
| 4/7 or 3/7 + bonus number | $20.00 | 1 in 72.2 |
| 3/7 | Free play | 1 in 7 |
| MaxMillions (7 of 7) (exact match only) | Win or share $1 million each set drawn | 4 in 133,784,560 |
| MaxPlus (7 of 7) (exact match only) | Win or share $100,000 each set drawn | 4 in 133,784,560 |

== Largest draws ==
=== Main prize ===
The July 17, 2015 drawing was the first held under new rules allowing the main jackpot to exceed $50 million. The $55 million prize was won by a group of 20 employees of a Rona store in Quebec. At the time, it was the second-largest lottery jackpot in Canadian history, behind a $63.4 million Lotto 6/49 drawing in 2013. The first ever Lotto Max drawing for $60 million occurred on September 25, 2015, with a single winning ticket sold in Brampton. The first ever Lotto Max drawing for $65 million occurred on June 11, 2019, with a single winning ticket in Montreal.

After a $65 million drawing on December 31, 2019, went without a winner, the first drawing for $70 million occurred on January 3, 2020. The first drawing for $75 million occurred on September 13, 2024. The prize rolled over to Lotto Max's first $80 million draw on September 17, which was split between two winning tickets sold in Ontario and Quebec. In October 2026, the Lotto Max jackpot had ballooned to the new maximum of $90 million—the largest jackpot in Canadian history. The first $90 million draw occurred on October 16, 2026, for which there was no winner. The following week on October 20, a winner in Alberta was drawn.

=== Prize pool ===
The July 6, 2012 drawing was the first to offer a pool of $100 million in main prizes, with a $50 million jackpot and 50 of the $1 million MaxMillions prizes. Three consecutive weeks of rollovers fuelled the large payout, which marked the largest Lotto Max drawing under the previous caps. This combination of a $50 million jackpot and 50 of the $1 million MaxMillions prizes, totalling $100 million in main prizes, was replicated on other occasions, including June 2015.

With the increase of the main jackpot's cap to $60 million, a new record was established on the August 12, 2016 draw with a $60 million jackpot and 42 MaxMillions prizes, totalling $102 million in main prizes. The jackpot had rolled over for eight consecutive weeks, fuelling the new prize pool record. This record was repeated on the January 6, 2017 draw. After a June 8, 2018 draw with a record of 50 MaxMillions prizes, the record was surpassed again in October 2018, where the October 26 draw featured 55 MaxMillions prizes, totalling $115 million in prizes. A winning ticket was sold in Edmonton. The June 15, 2021 draw featured a record 58 MaxMillions prizes and the maximum $70 million jackpot, totalling $128 million in main prizes. The draw would have 64 MaxMillions prizes, 42 of which were won. The June 18 draw was estimated to have 70 MaxMillions prizes, totalling $140 million in main prizes. This was also carried over to the June 22 draw, in which the main jackpot was won by two winning tickets in British Columbia and Ontario. In addition, 46 MaxMillions prizes were won.
