= Lottery =

Gambling that involves the drawing of numbers at random for a prize

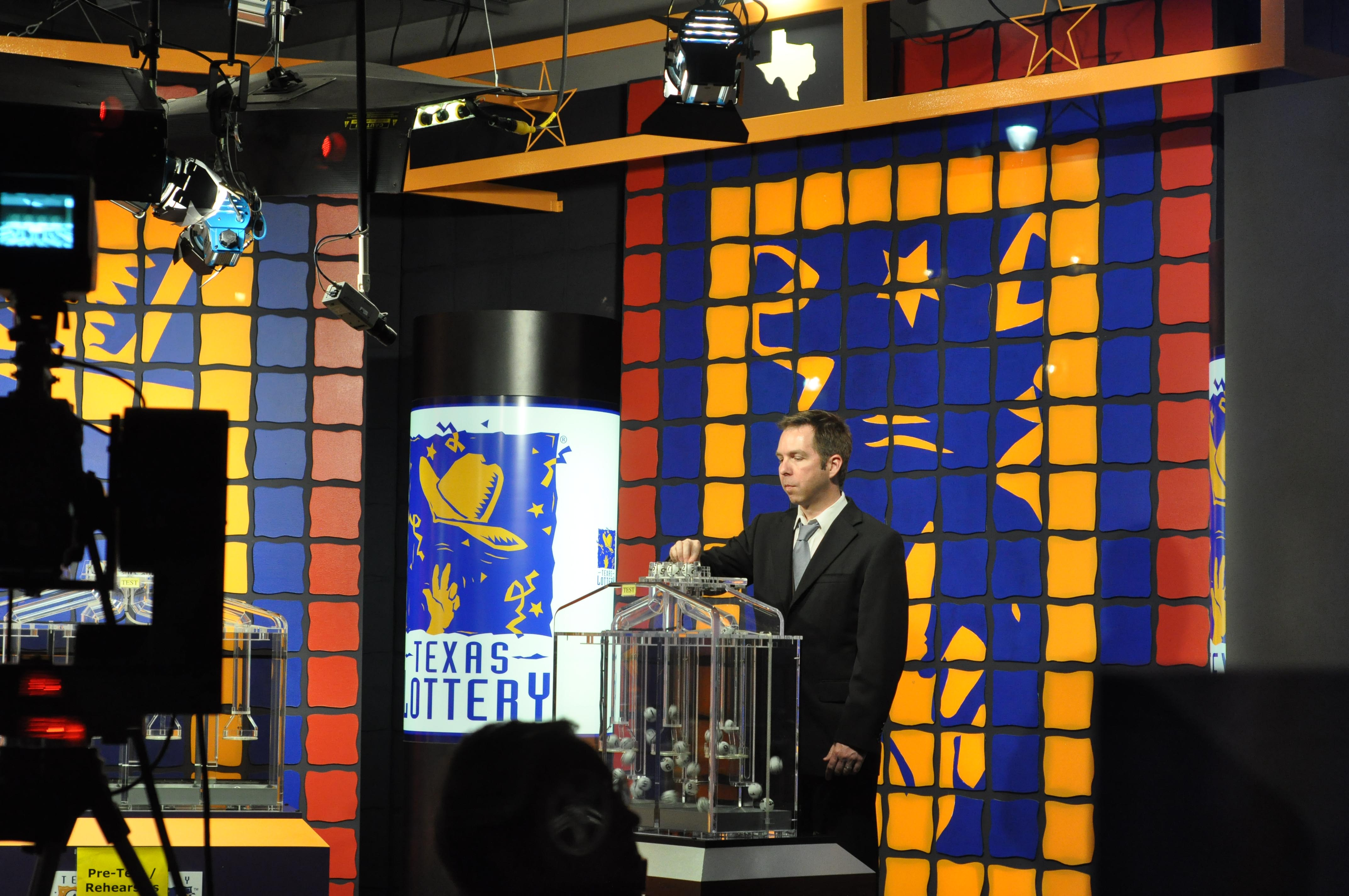
A lottery drawing being conducted at the television studio at Texas Lottery Commission headquarters

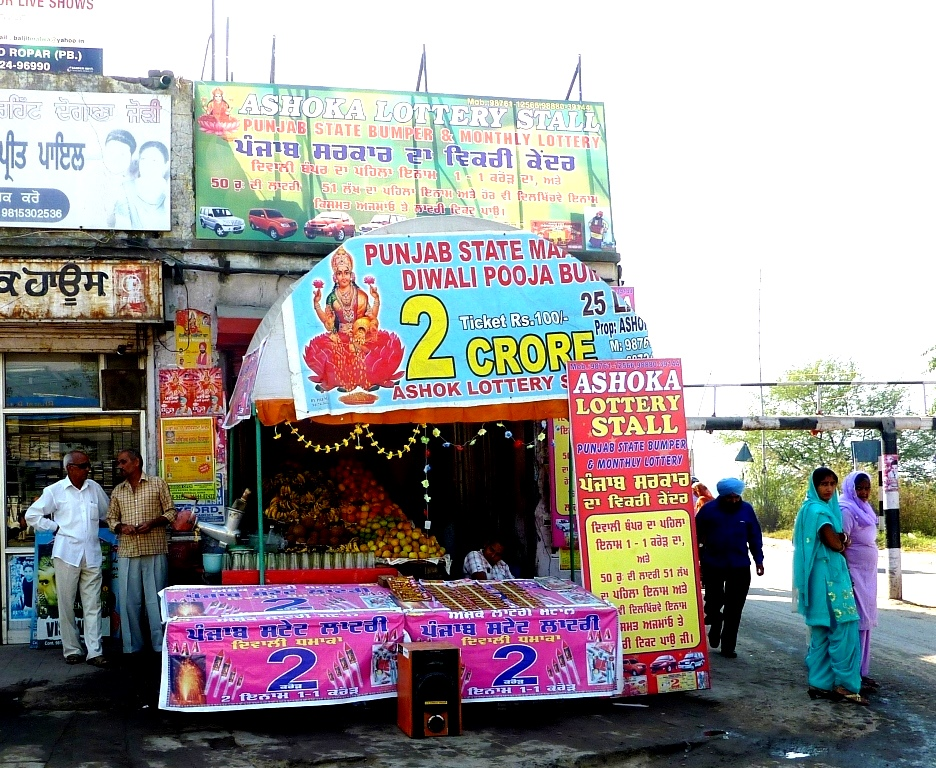
Lottery tickets for sale, Ropar, India. 2019

A lottery (or lotto) is a form of gambling that involves the drawing of numbers at random for a prize. Some governments outlaw lotteries, while others endorse them to the extent of organizing a national or state lottery. It is common to find some degree of regulation of lottery by governments. The most common regulations are prohibition of sale to minors and licensing of ticket vendors. Although lotteries were common in the United States and some other countries during the 19th century, by the beginning of the 20th century, most forms of gambling, including lotteries and sweepstakes, were illegal in the U.S. and most of Europe as well as many other countries. This remained so until well after World War II. In the 1960s, casinos and lotteries began to re-appear throughout the world as a means for governments to raise revenue without raising taxes.

Lotteries come in many formats. For example, the prize can be a fixed amount of cash or goods. In this format, there is risk to the organizer if insufficient tickets are sold. More commonly, the prize fund will be a fixed percentage of the receipts. A popular form of this is the "50–50" draw, where the organizers promise that the prize will be 50% of the revenue. Many recent lotteries allow purchasers to select the numbers on the lottery ticket, resulting in the possibility of multiple winners.

== Classical history ==
The first recorded signs of a lottery are keno slips from the Chinese Han dynasty between 205 and 187 BC. These lotteries are believed to have helped to finance major government projects like the Great Wall of China. From the Chinese Book of Songs (2nd millennium BC.) comes a reference to a game of chance as "the drawing of wood", which in context appears to describe the drawing of lots.

The first known European lotteries were held during the Roman Empire, mainly as an amusement at dinner parties. Each guest would receive a ticket, and prizes would often consist of fancy items such as dinnerware. Every ticket holder would be assured of winning something. This type of lottery, however, was no more than the distribution of gifts by wealthy noblemen during the Saturnalian revelries. The earliest records of a lottery offering tickets for sale is the lottery organized by Roman Emperor Augustus. The funds were for repairs in the City of Rome, and the winners were given prizes in the form of articles of unequal value.

== Medieval history ==
The first recorded lotteries to offer tickets for sale with prizes in the form of money were held in the Low Countries in the 15th century. Various towns held public lotteries to raise money for town fortifications, and to help the poor. The town records of Ghent, Utrecht, and Bruges indicate that lotteries may be even older. A record dated 9 May 1445 at L'Ecluse refers to raising funds to build walls and town fortifications, with a lottery of 4,304 tickets and total prize money of 1737 florins (worth about US$170,000 in 2014). In the 17th century it was quite usual in the Netherlands to organize lotteries to collect money for the poor or in order to raise funds for a wide range of public usages. The lotteries proved very popular and were hailed as a painless form of taxation. The Dutch state-owned Staatsloterij is the oldest running lottery (1726). The English word lottery is derived from the Dutch noun "lot" meaning "fate".

The first recorded Italian lottery was held on 9 January 1449 in Milan organized by the Golden Ambrosian Republic to finance the war against the Republic of Venice. However, it was in Genoa that Lotto became very popular. People used to bet on the name of Great Council members, who were drawn by chance, five out of ninety candidates every six months. This kind of gambling was called Lotto or Semenaiu. When people wanted to bet more frequently than twice a year, they began to substitute the candidates names with numbers and modern lotto was born, to which both modern legal lotteries and the illegal numbers game can trace their ancestry.

== Early modern history ==
=== France, 1539–1836 ===
King Francis I of France discovered the lotteries during his campaigns in Italy and decided to organize such a lottery in his kingdom to help the state finances. The first French lottery, the Loterie Royale, was held in 1539 and was authorized with the edict of Châteaurenard. This attempt was a fiasco, since the tickets were very costly and the social classes which could afford them opposed the project.

Between 1757 and 1836, for a period of about 80 years with some interruption during the French Revolution, the French state ran a profitable Loterie. The project was born out a series of initiatives to fund the École militaire. Instrumental to the birth of the Loterie were Giacomo Casanova and the Calzabigi brothers (Giovanni and Ranieri). Casanova defended the project in a series of conversations with Madame de Pompadour, the French mathematician Jean d'Alembert, Joseph de Pâris Duverney, intendent of the École, and the French minister of foreign affair. Unlike modern lotteries where the state can never lose, in the French lottery the state could lose, but a wise choice of the payoff made losses so improbable as to ensure a profit for the state.

=== England, 1566–1826 ===
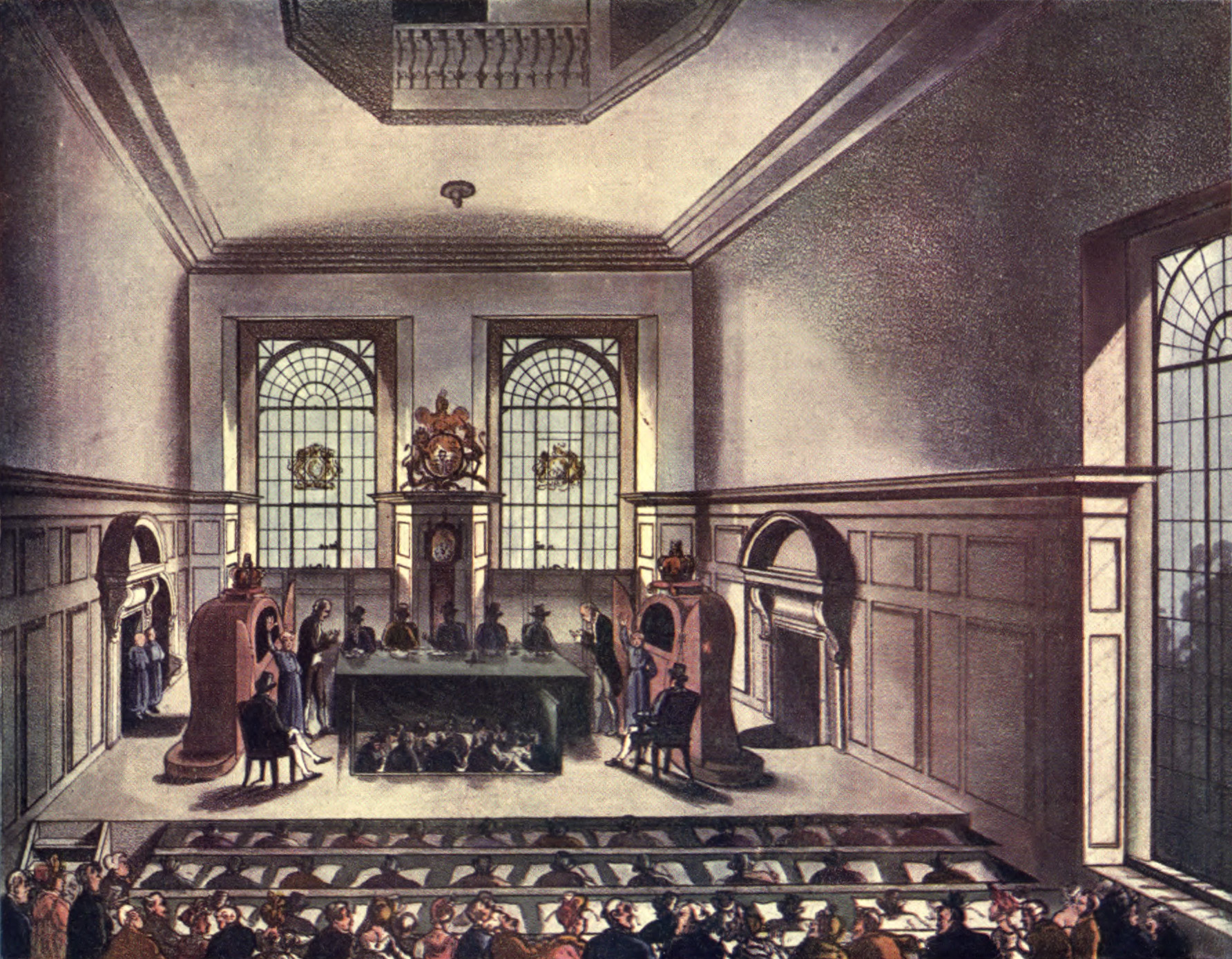
An 1809 lottery drawing at Coopers' Hall in London

Although the English probably first experimented with raffles and similar games of chance, the first recorded official lottery was chartered by Queen Elizabeth I, in the year 1566, and was drawn in 1569. The 400,000 tickets issued cost 10 shillings (£0.50) each (roughly three weeks of wages for ordinary citizens), with the grand prize worth roughly £5,000. This lottery was designed to raise money for the "reparation of the havens and strength of the Realme, and towardes such other publique good workes", including the rebuilding of ports and new ships for the royal fleet. Each ticket holder won a prize, and the total value of the prizes equalled the money raised. Prizes were in the form of both "ready money" and valuable commodities such as silver plate, tapestries, and fine linen cloth. Additionally, each participant was granted immunity from one arrest, "so long as the crime wasn't piracy, murder, felonies, or treason." The lottery was promoted by scrolls posted throughout the country showing sketches of the prizes.

Selling tickets in London for the last government lottery in England

Thus, the lottery money received was an interest-free loan to the government during the three years that the tickets ('without any Blankes') were sold. In later years, the government sold the lottery ticket rights to brokers, who in turn hired agents and runners to sell them. These brokers eventually became the modern-day stockbrokers for various commercial ventures. Most people could not afford the entire cost of a lottery ticket, so the brokers would sell shares in a ticket; this resulted in tickets being issued with a notation such as "Sixteenth" or "Third Class".

Many private lotteries were held, including raising money for the Virginia Company of London to support its settlement in America at Jamestown. The English State Lottery ran from 1694 until 1826. Thus, the English lotteries ran for over 250 years, until the government, under constant pressure from the opposition in Parliament, declared a final lottery in 1826. This lottery was held up to ridicule by contemporary commentators as "the last struggle of the speculators on public credulity for popularity to their last dying lottery".

=== British North America 1612–1783 ===
An English lottery, authorized by King James I in 1612, granted the Virginia Company of London the right to raise money to help establish settlers in the first permanent English colony at Jamestown, Virginia.

Lotteries in colonial America played a significant part in the financing of both private and public ventures. It has been recorded that more than 200 lotteries were sanctioned between 1744 and 1776, and played a major role in financing roads, libraries, churches, colleges, canals, bridges, etc. In the 1740s, the foundation of Princeton and Columbia Universities was financed by lotteries, as was the University of Pennsylvania by the Academy Lottery in 1755.

During the French and Indian Wars, several colonies used lotteries to help finance fortifications and their local militia. In May 1758, the Province of Massachusetts Bay raised money with a lottery for the "Expedition against Canada".

Benjamin Franklin organized a lottery to raise money to purchase cannons for the defense of Philadelphia. Several of these lotteries offered prizes in the form of "Pieces of Eight". George Washington's Mountain Road Lottery in 1768 was unsuccessful, but these rare lottery tickets bearing Washington's signature became collector's items; one example sold for about $15,000 in 2007. Washington was also a manager for Col. Bernard Moore's "Slave Lottery" in 1769, which advertised land and slaves as prizes in The Virginia Gazette.

At the outset of the Revolutionary War, the Continental Congress used lotteries to raise money to support the Colonial Army. Alexander Hamilton wrote that lotteries should be kept simple, and that "Everybody ... will be willing to hazard a trifling sum for the chance of considerable gain ... and would prefer a small chance of winning a great deal to a great chance of winning little". Taxes had never been accepted as a way to raise public funding for projects, and this led to the popular belief that lotteries were a form of hidden tax.

At the end of the Revolutionary War the various states had to resort to lotteries to raise funds for numerous public projects.

=== German-speaking countries ===
The first big lottery on German soil was held in 1614 in Hamburg.

In Austria the first lottery was drawn in 1751, during the reign of Empress Maria Theresia, and was named Lotto di Genova since it was based on 90 numbers.

=== Spain, 1763 ===
Spain offers a wealth of lottery games, the majority of which are operated by Loterías y Apuestas del Estado with the remaining lotteries operated by the blind charity ONCE and the Catalan government's Loteria de Catalunya. The first Spanish lottery game was played back in 1763 and, over the last two centuries, playing the lottery in Spain has developed into a tradition.

The Spanish Christmas Lottery (officially Sorteo Extraordinario de Navidad Spanish pronunciation: [soɾˈteo ekstɾaorðiˈnaɾjo ðe naβiˈðað] or simply Lotería de Navidad Spanish pronunciation: [loteˈɾia ðe naβiˈðað]) is a national lottery. It is organized every year since 1812 by a branch of the Spanish Public Administration, now called Loterías y Apuestas del Estado. The name Sorteo de Navidad was used for the first time in 1892.

The Spanish Christmas lottery is the second longest continuously running lottery in the world. This includes the years during the Spanish Civil War when the lottery draw was held in Valencia after the Republicans were forced to relocate their capital from Madrid. After the overthrow of the Republican government the lottery continued uninterrupted under the Franco regime.

== Ticket gallery ==
English Lottery 1566 Scroll.

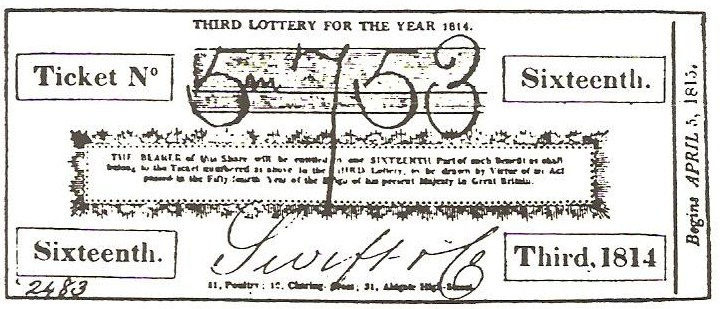
English State Lottery Ticket 1814 issued by broker Swift & Co.

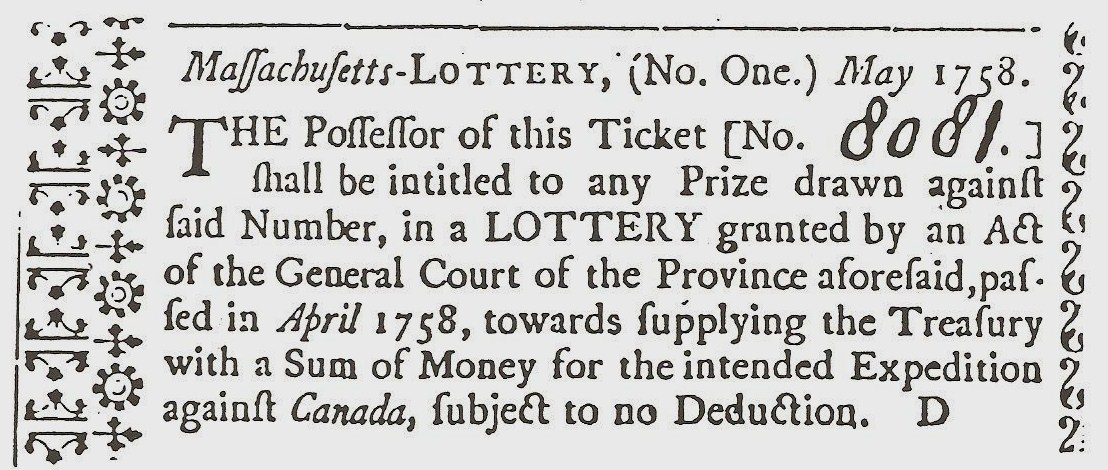
Massachusetts Lottery Ticket 1758 French & Indian Wars

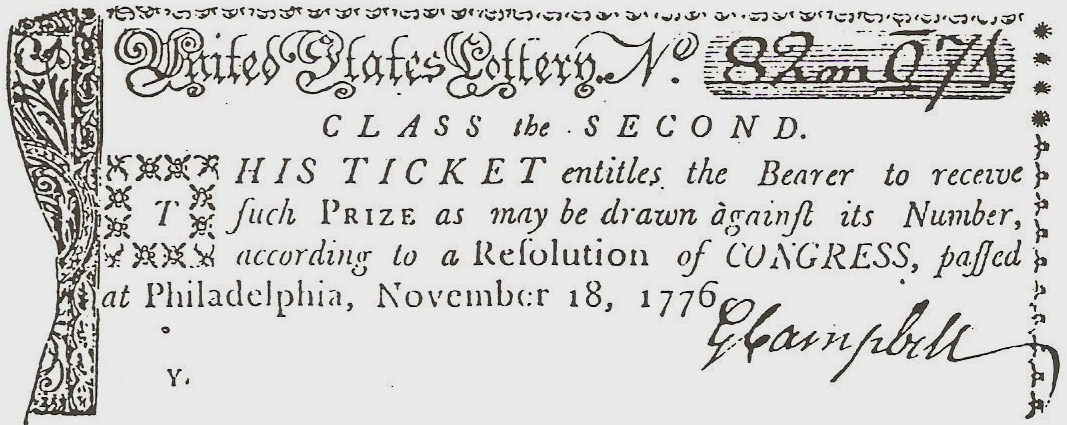
1776 Lottery ticket issued by the Continental Congress to finance the American Revolutionary War.

Harvard Lottery Ticket 1811

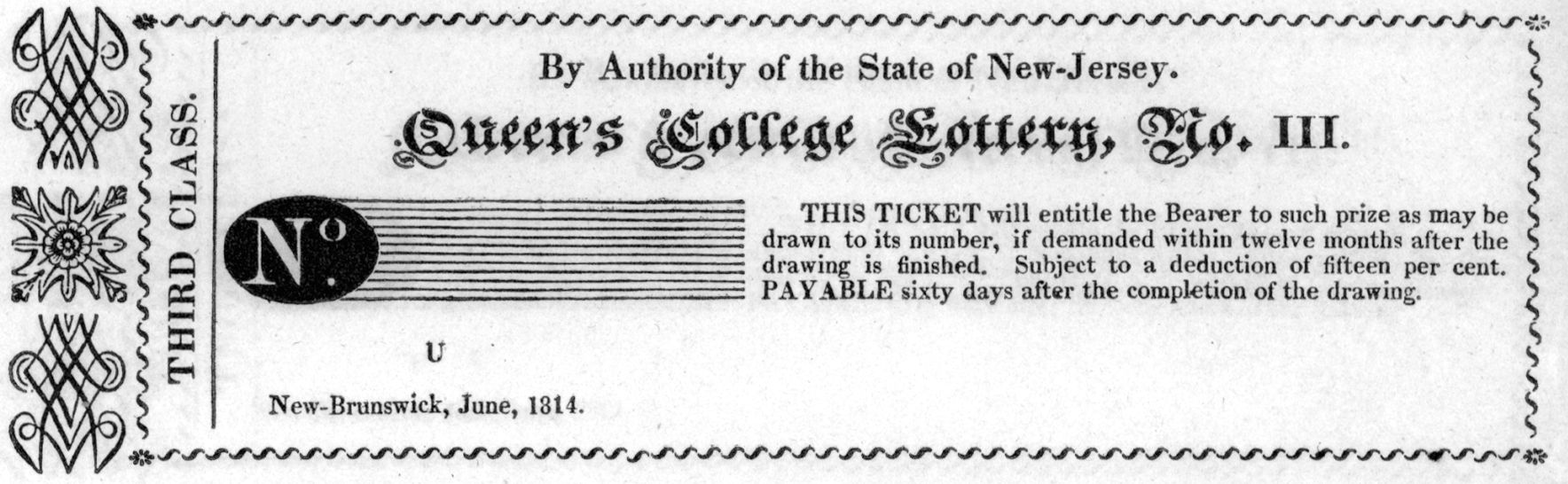
Ticket from an 1814 lottery to raise money for Queen's College, New Jersey.

New Hampshire Lottery Ticket 1964

== Modern history by country ==
Notable prizes on different continents are:

Prize (local currency)	Lottery	Country	Notable winner	Date	Notes
$2.04 billion pre-tax	Powerball	United States	One winner	10 November 2022	World's largest jackpot
£194 million	EuroMillions	United Kingdom	One ticket holder	19 July 2022	Europe's largest jackpot
RMB¥ 570 million	China Welfare Lottery	China	One ticket holder from Beijing	12 June 2012	Asian largest prize and the biggest prize taken in China
R$244 million	Mega-Sena	Brazil	Three ticket holders from Franca (SP), Aparecida de Goiania (GO) and São Paulo.	31 December 2012	South America's largest prize
A$200 million	Powerball (Australia)	Australia	Three winners	1 February 2024	Australia's largest jackpot

=== Australia ===
The first lottery in Australia took place in the 1880s in Sydney. It was a private sweepstakes that was quickly prohibited, despite being moved to other areas such as Queensland and Victoria. In 1916, the Australian government started their own lottery, named the 'Golden Casket Art Union', with the intention of raising money for charities and projects. Its first draw is credited with raising funds for veterans of World War One.

=== Canada ===
Lotteries in Canada are administered by five regional organizations; the Atlantic Lottery Corporation (which serves Atlantic Canada), Loto-Québec, the Ontario Lottery and Gaming Corporation, the Western Canada Lottery Corporation (which serves Western and Northern Canada, excluding British Columbia), and the British Columbia Lottery Corporation. The five regional lotteries are members of a consortium known as the Interprovincial Lottery Corporation, which administrates national games, including the flagship Lotto 6/49 and Lotto Max. The five lotteries offer draw games, scratch cards, and sports betting—the latter primarily under the brand Sport Select.

The largest single jackpot record in Canadian lottery history was a Lotto Max drawing on January 7, 2020, for a jackpot of $70 million.

=== Finland ===
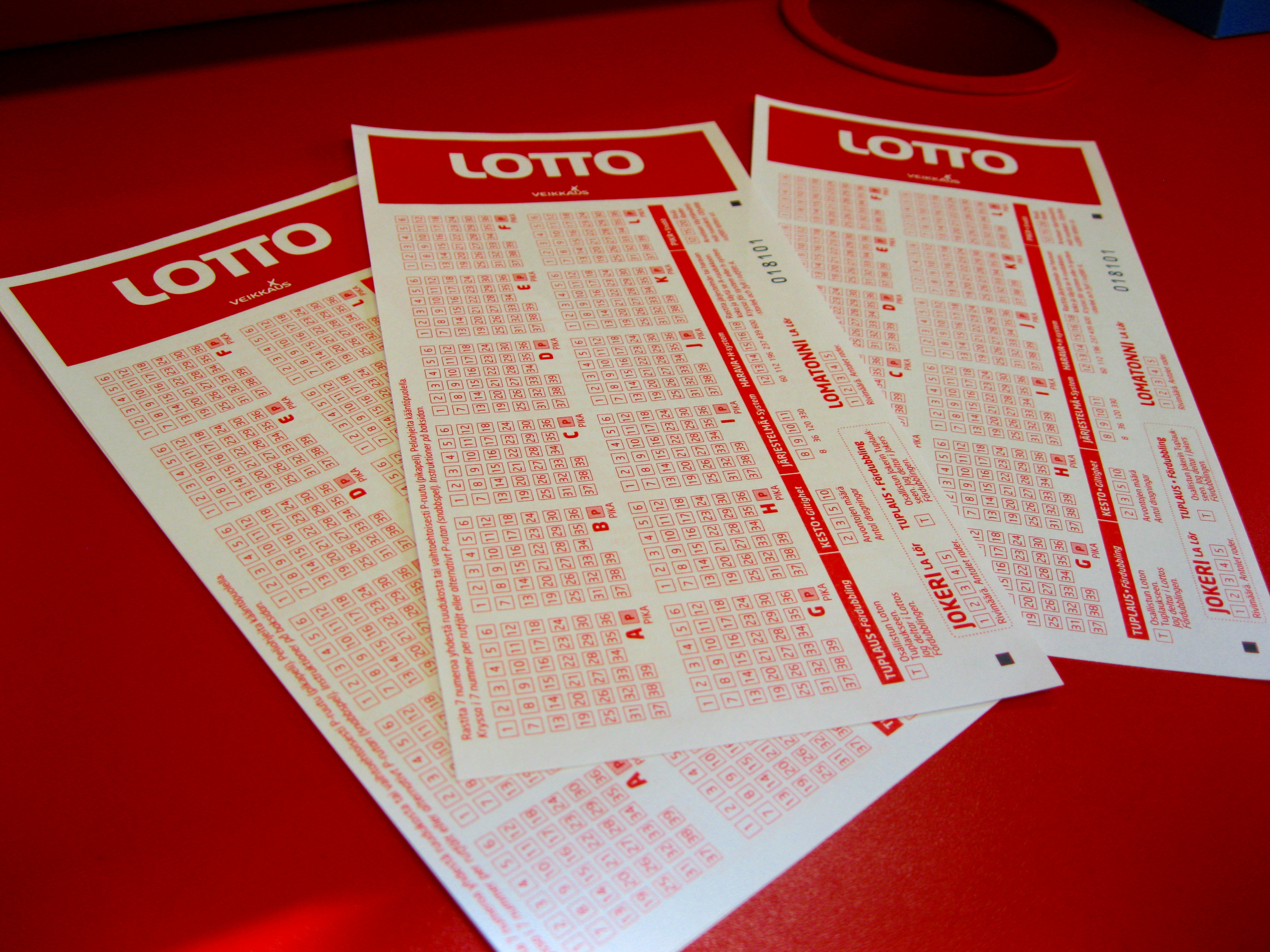
Finnish lottery tickets

In Finland, Veikkaus began selling lottery tickets in December 1970, and the first draw was televised on January 3, 1971. The lottery turned 40 on January 3, 2011, and by then the lottery had been drawn 2,126 times. Since then, there has been one lottery draw every week. Lottery game time usually ends on Saturday at 9:45 p.m., and the draw is usually held on Saturday at 10:15 p.m. Large public holidays on Saturdays may postpone the draw to Sunday. The lottery has two official supervisors; from 3 January 1971 to 29 September 2013, the lottery was televised on Yle TV1, and in October 2013, the lottery draws were postponed on MTV3 after ten evening news, because according to FICORA, the sponsorship cooperation between Veikkaus and Yle was illegal.

In the current lottery played in Finland, the player chooses seven numbers between 1 and 40 (initially, until the autumn of 1980, six numbers between 1 and 40 were chosen, then for a few years seven numbers between 1 and 37 and then seven numbers between 1 and 39). In the draw, seven numbers and one (previously three and then two) additional numbers are drawn; the line price is 1 euro. The profit categories were changed, for example, from the 2011 round 41. The main victory at that time was with 7 correct results and the smallest victory with three actual and one additional number, the number of which was reduced from three to two. The lottery return percentage is 41.1.

Another lottery game played in Finland is Vikinglotto, which can be played in all Nordic countries as well as in Estonia, Latvia and Lithuania. In Vikinglotto, six actual numbers and two additional numbers out of 48 are drawn. There are five winning categories: 6 correct, 5 + extra number, 5 correct, 4 correct and 3 correct.

In Finland, an average of six million euros in winnings go unredeemed each year.

=== France ===
A national lottery was reintroduced in 1933.

=== India ===
There are many lotteries in India. All lotteries are run by state governments but only 13 of the 28 Indian states allow them. The leader within Indian lotteries is the Kerala State Government that started their lottery department in 1967 following the country wide ban on private lotteries.

The Kerala State Lotteries became an inspiration for other Indian states that started their own lotteries. As of right now lotteries are available in Kerala, Goa, Maharashtra, Madhya Pradesh, Punjab, West Bengal, Assam, Arunachal Pradesh, Meghalaya, Manipur, Sikkim, Nagaland and Mizoram.

The public ban on lotteries in other states has not been very effective since several lottery providers allow Indians to play online. Indian players can play lotteries from all over the world thanks to online lottery agents and bookkeepers. Some states have tried to combat this with different measures. The state government of Tamil Nadu decided to ban Google Pay since it allows payments to online lotteries and awards its users in India with Scratchcards.

Indian lotteries provide a substantial economic boost for the states that provide them. In the fiscal year 2017–2018 Kerala collected GST worth Rs 908 crore and state revenue of Rs 1,691 crore.

=== Malaysia ===
Lottery industry start operated in Malaysia on early 1969 by Berjaya Group. Sports Toto Malaysia Sdn Bhd is a Malaysian company, which operates in the gambling sector.

Founded and incorporated by the Malaysian Government in 1969, it was focused on the commercialisation of 4-Digits–based games. On 1 August 1985, the government in a non-tender privatisation, sold the company to businessman Vincent Tan who merged it into his Berjaya Group.

Today, Sports Toto is a wholly owned subsidiary of Berjaya Sports Toto Berhad (MYX: 1562), which is listed on the main market of Bursa Malaysia. It claims to be the largest operator in Malaysia of 4D-based games, with 680 sales outlets offering a total of 7 games.

=== Mexico ===
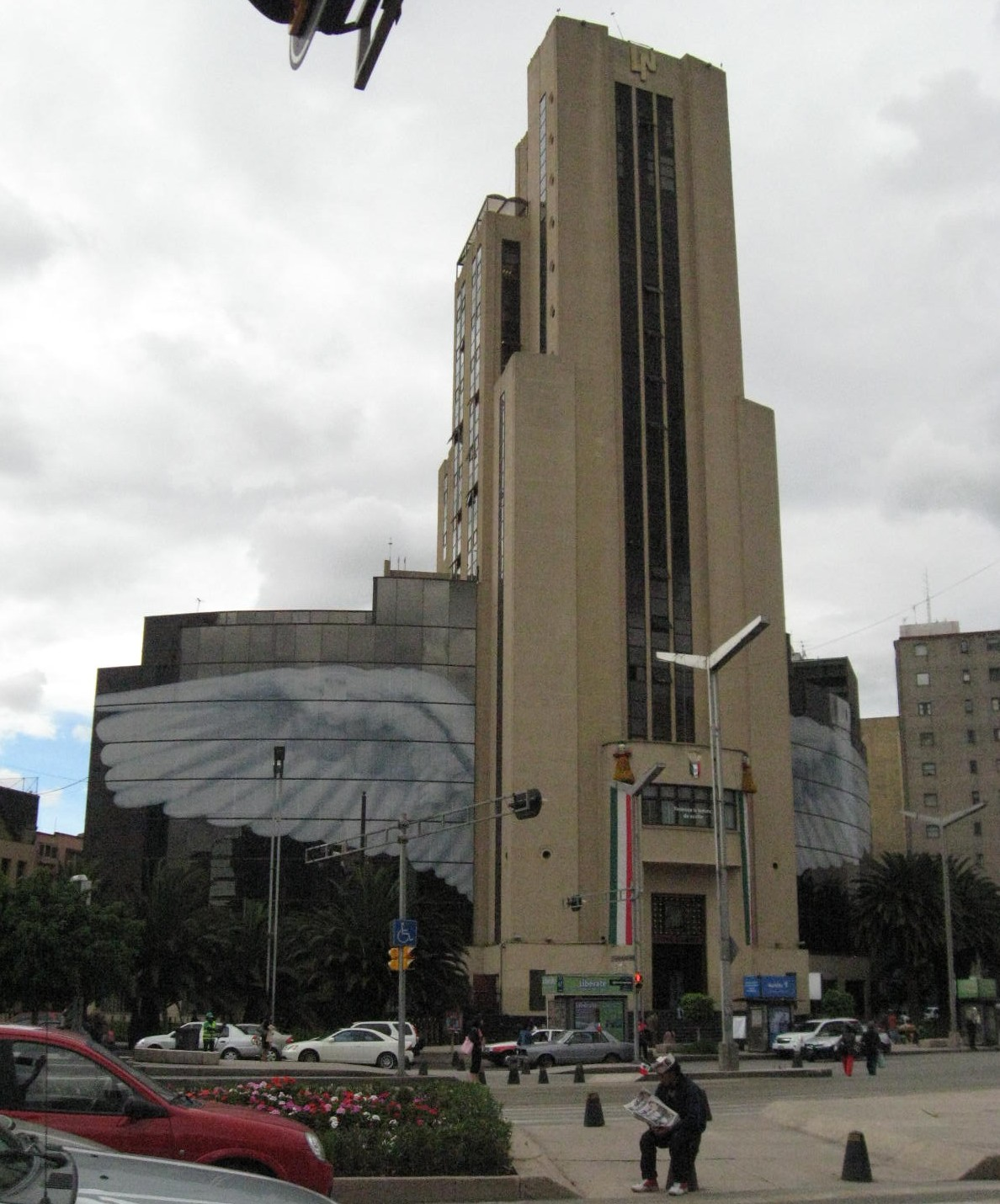
National Lottery building located in Mexico City

The Mexican Lotería Nacional dates back to the late 18th century. The goal of the Lotería is to create jobs and to "impulse the wealth redistribution process". The Lotería is also a member of the North American Association of State and Provincial Lotteries.

=== Spain ===
As measured by the total prize payout, the Spanish Christmas Lottery is considered the biggest lottery worldwide. In 2012, if all of the tickets had been sold, the total amount payout of prizes would have been worth €2.52 billion (70% of ticket sales). The total amount of all prizes of the first category called El Gordo ("the fat one") was €720 million which was distributed among 180 winning tickets (billetes) that win €4 million each. The Christmas lottery is a yearly event, an extraordinary version of the ordinary Saturday lottery. There are several other extraordinary editions along the year.

For 2013, due to falling demand, the number of €20 tickets available was reduced from 180 million to 160 million, reducing the potential maximum prize pool to €2.24 billion (70% of ticket sales), with a maximum potential El Gordo of €720 million.

The state lottery also operates Lotería Primitiva, in which players pick at least six numbers out of 49. It also sells local tickets to Europe-wide lotteries.

The blind charity ONCE operates its own lottery. Sellers are mostly blind or otherwise handicapped.

The Government of Catalonia operates Loteria de Catalunya.

=== Thailand ===
A lottery was first held in Thailand (then known as Siam) in 1874 during the reign of King Chulalongkorn (Rama V), as part of an international fair organised for his birthday. A lottery was organised in 1917 by the British government with Thai consent to help finance Britain's war effort. Lotteries were held intermittently until 1933, when they became regularised under the finance department.

The present Thai lottery is managed by The Government Lottery Office, a state enterprise managed by the Ministry of Finance. The drawings take place on the 1st and 16th of each month, with the top price now up to 32 million baht.

Shrines of local folklore and popular religion, such as Nang Ta-Khian, are often propitiated in order to be lucky in the Thai lottery draw.

=== United Kingdom ===
The principal lottery in the United Kingdom is the National Lottery, a state-franchised lottery sanctioned by the Gambling Commission (formerly the National Lottery Commission), and established in 1994. It is operated by Allwyn Entertainment Ltd, who took over from the original operator Camelot Group in 2024. 28% of National Lottery revenue, along with all unclaimed prizes, are distributed as grants to charitable causes. 12% of the revenue from the National Lottery is expected to go to the government, 5% goes to lottery retailers, 5% is retained by the operator for operating costs, and 50% remains for the total prize fund of which 5% is diverted to a Super Draw fund, leaving 45% for normal prizes.

Northern & Shell also operates a commercial lottery known as The Health Lottery, which distributes its revenue to support health-related charities and causes. To comply with the Gambling Act, which forbids other parties from operating a national lottery, The Health Lottery operates as an umbrella corporation representing a group of 51 society lotteries across the United Kingdom with a common drawing and prize pool. Each drawing is held on behalf of one or more of the society lotteries, whose revenues go to support health-related causes in their respective area. The Health Lottery received criticism on launch for only pledging to donate 20.3% of ticket costs to charity, compared to the National Lottery's 28%, and that the lottery's structure was designed to contravene British law regarding lotteries. In the UK, winning the lottery is correlated to expressing more preference for the Conservative Party. Winning larger prizes results in a larger shift in favour of the Conservative Party.

Postcode Lottery is a subscription lottery in Great Britain. The format was introduced by Dutch company Postcode Lottery Group, which rebranded from "People's Postcode Lottery" to "Postcode Lottery" across its markets in early 2026. Players pay at minimum £12.50 monthly to play, and winning postcodes are announced daily. In accordance with restrictions under the Gambling Act 2005, the maximum amount which can be won by a single ticket is £500,000, or 10% of the total draw proceeds. A minimum of 30% of the ticket price from players' subscriptions supports various trusts, which in turn fund local and international charities and community projects. Some £1.7 billion has been donated. The lottery was the subject of two Channel 4 documentaries: The Welsh Valley That Won the Lottery, about the residents of Rhymney who won in May 2022, and The Scottish Island That Won the Lottery, about the residents of North Uist who won in February 2020.

=== United States ===
Lotteries are operated at the state level in the U.S.; 45 states and 3 territories operate state lotteries, and nearly all of them are members of consortiums that operate regional games, and the two near-national games Mega Millions and Powerball. In November 2022, Powerball set a record for the largest lottery jackpot in U.S. history, with its 8 November 2022 draw having an estimated jackpot of US$2 billion.

The precursor to legal lotteries were the underground "numbers game" of the 1800s, which operated out of "Policy shops" where bettors choose numbers. In 1875, a report of a select committee of the New York State Assembly stated that "the lowest, meanest, worst form ... [that] gambling takes in the city of New York, is what is known as policy playing". The game was also popular in Italian neighborhoods known as the Italian lottery, and it was known in Cuban communities as bolita ("little ball"). By the early 20th century, the game was associated with poor communities, and could be played for as little as $0.01. The game's attractions to low income and working class bettors were the ability to bet small amounts of money, and that bookies could extend credit to the bettor. In addition, policy winners could avoid paying income tax. Different policy banks would offer different rates, though a payoff of 600 to 1 was typical. Since the odds of winning were 1000:1, the expected profit for racketeers was enormous.

The first modern government-run US lottery was established in Puerto Rico in 1934, followed by New Hampshire in 1964.

In 2018, Ohio became one of the first states to offer people a digital lottery option. The technology, developed by Linq3, allows players to play the lottery on their smart phones.

=== Vietnam ===
In Vietnam, there are two types of lotteries: traditional lotteries, which are operated at the provincial level, and national electronic lotteries (notably Vietlott). The Ministry of Finance manages provincial lottery companies, and these lottery companies conduct lottery draws and award the winners. Lottery tickets are often sold by people at the bottom rungs of society who hawk the tickets as odd jobs. Buyers consider purchasing the tickets a "voluntary tax" to support people in need of income.

Accompanying the lottery is the betting game, an illegal form of lottery among the people, which uses the results of the jackpot of the legal traditional lottery as the prize-winning results. In Hanoi, the "agent" system of the betting game has developed along with traditional lottery stores and iced tea stalls, operating quite openly. In addition, some players have switched to online betting.

According to traditional lottery companies, the revenue from the traditional lottery is decreasing day by day because it cannot compete with Vietlott and the betting game.

== Mathematical analysis ==
The purchase of lottery tickets cannot be accounted for by decision models based on expected value maximization. The reason is that lottery tickets cost more than the expected gain, as shown by lottery mathematics, so someone maximizing expected value would not buy lottery tickets. People buy lottery tickets anyway, either because they do not understand the mathematics, or because they find the thrill and fantasy of becoming wealthy to be worthwhile. If this entertainment value and any other non-monetary value is factored into the utility function, a lottery ticket purchase can be considered rational according to expected utility maximization.

=== Probability of winning ===
Chances of matching different numbers of balls in a 6-from-49 lotto
Number of balls matched	Probability
6	1 in 13,983,816
5	1 in 54,201
4	1 in 1,032
3	1 in 57
2	1 in 7.6
1	1 in 2.4
0	1 in 2.3

The chances of winning a lottery jackpot can vary widely depending on the lottery design, and are determined by several factors, including the count of possible numbers, the count of winning numbers drawn, whether or not order is significant, and whether drawn numbers are returned for the possibility of further drawing.

In a simple 6-from-49 lotto, a player chooses six numbers from 1 to 49 (no duplicates are allowed). If all six numbers on the player's ticket match those produced in the official drawing (regardless of the order in which the numbers are drawn), then the player is a jackpot winner. For such a lottery, the chance of being a jackpot winner is 1 in 13,983,816.

In bonusball lotteries where the bonus ball is compulsory, the odds are often even lower. In the Mega Millions multi-state lottery in the United States, 5 numbers are drawn from a group of 70 and 1 number is drawn from a group of 25, and a player must match all 6 balls to win the jackpot prize. The chance of winning the jackpot is 1 in 302,575,350.

The odds of winning can also be reduced by increasing the group from which numbers are drawn. In the SuperEnalotto of Italy, players must match 6 numbers out of 90. The chance of winning the jackpot is 1 in 622,614,630.

Most lotteries give lesser prizes for matching just some of the winning numbers, with a lesser prize for fewer matches. Although none of these additional prizes affect the chances of winning the jackpot, they do improve the odds of winning something and therefore add a little to the value of the ticket.

== Scams and frauds ==
Lotteries, like any form of gambling, are susceptible to fraud, despite the high degree of scrutiny claimed by the organizers. Numerous lottery scams exist.

Some advance fee fraud scams on the Internet are based on lotteries. The fraud starts with spam congratulating the recipient on their recent lottery win. The email explains that in order to release funds the email recipient must part with a certain amount (as tax/fees) as per the rules or risk forfeiture.

Another form of scam involves the selling of "systems" which purport to improve a player's chances of selecting the winning numbers in a Lotto game. These scams are generally based on the buyer's (and perhaps the seller's) misunderstanding of probability and random numbers. Sale of these systems or software is legal, however, since they mention that the product cannot guarantee a win, let alone a jackpot.

There have also been several cases of cashiers at lottery retailers who have attempted to scam customers out of their winnings. Some locations require the patron to hand the lottery ticket to the cashier to determine how much they have won, or if they have won at all, the cashier then scans the ticket to determine one or both. In cases where there is no visible or audible cue to the patron of the outcome of the scan some cashiers have taken the opportunity to claim that the ticket is a loser or that it is worth far less than it is and offer to "throw it away" or surreptitiously substitute it for another ticket. The cashier then pockets the ticket and eventually claims it as their own.

The BBC TV series The Real Hustle showed a variation of the lottery scam in which a group of scammers pretended to have won a lottery, but was prevented from claiming the prize as the person who wrote the name on the back of the ticket was supposedly out of the country on that date. They were able to persuade a stranger to put up money as collateral in order to share in the prize pool.

On some occasions, the actual lottery draw itself has been compromised by fraudsters. The 1980 Pennsylvania Lottery scandal involved weighting balls in The Daily Number. In the Hot Lotto fraud scandal software code was added to the Hot Lotto random number generator allowing a fraudster to predict winning numbers on specific days of the year.

In 2003, Mohan Srivastava, a Canadian geological statistician, found non-random patterns in "Tic-Tac-Toe" tickets sold by the Ontario Lottery and Gaming Corporation. "Tic-Tac-Toe" was pulled off the shelves, and became the first game ever recalled by the OLG.

== Payment of prizes ==
Winnings are not necessarily paid out in a lump sum, contrary to the expectation of many lottery participants. In certain countries, mainly the U.S., the winner gets to choose between an annuity payment and a one-time payment. The one-time payment (cash or lump sum) is a "smaller" amount than the advertised (annuity) jackpot, having regard to the time value of money, even before applying any income taxes to which the prize is subject. While withholdings vary by jurisdiction and how winnings are invested, it is suggested that a winner who chooses lump sum expects to pocket 1/3 of the advertised jackpot at the end of the tax year. Therefore, a winner of a $90m jackpot who chooses cash can expect $30m net after filing income tax document(s) for the year in which the jackpot was won.

Lottery annuities are often for a period from 20 to 30 years. Some U.S. lottery games, especially those offering a "lifetime" prize, do not offer a lump-sum option. According to some experts, choosing the annuity is better than opting for the lump-sum, especially for those who lack investment experience. However, many winners choose lump sum, since they believe they can get a better rate of return on their investment elsewhere.

In some online lotteries, the annual payments are only $25,000, with a balloon payment in the final year. This type of installment payment is often made through investment in government-backed securities. Online lotteries pay the winners through their insurance backup.

In some countries, lottery winnings are not subject to personal income tax, so there are no tax consequences to consider in choosing a payment option. In France, Canada, Australia, Germany, Ireland, Italy, New Zealand, Finland, and the United Kingdom, all prizes are immediately paid out as one lump sum, tax-free to the winner. In Liechtenstein, all winnings are tax-free and the winner may opt to receive a lump sum or an annuity with regard to the jackpot prizes.

In the US, federal courts have consistently held that lump sum payments received from third parties in exchange for the rights to lottery annuities are not capital assets for tax purpose. Rather, the lump sum is subject to ordinary income tax treatment.

Some people hire a third party to cash the lottery ticket for them. This can be done to avoid paying income taxes, hide the winnings from being seized for child support, or for money laundering of profits from illegal activity; some jurisdictions investigate overly frequent "winners" and may freeze payments to prevent these abuses.

In jurisdictions where public disclosure is required for winners to claim their prizes, some winners may hire an attorney to set up a blind trust for them so they can claim their prize and remain anonymous. This is done so that winners can avoid scams, jealousy, and other disadvantages that can come with winning a lottery jackpot.

== Outcomes for big winners ==
A study by the National Bureau of Economic Research found that people in Sweden who won large sums of money from the lottery tended to retain their wealth over a period of 10 years, often kept their jobs but took more vacation, and maintained or increased their happiness and mental health. The same study states that the common anecdote that "70% of people who receive a large influx of money will lose it within a few years" is false, and is falsely attributed to the National Endowment for Financial Education (NEFE). NEFE released a statement disassociating themselves from the claim.

== See also ==
- Betting pool
- Combinatorial number system
- Gambling
- Gaming mathematics
- GTech Corporation
- Intralot
- Keno
- List of lotteries
- Lotteries by country
- Problem gambling
- Scratchcard
