= Lotto 6/49 =

Canadian lottery game

Lotto 6/49 logo

Lotto 6/49 is one of three national lottery games in Canada. Launched on June 12, 1982, Lotto 6/49 was the first nationwide Canadian lottery game to allow players to choose their own numbers. Previous national games, such as the Olympic Lottery, Loto Canada and Superloto used pre-printed numbers on tickets. Lotto 6/49 led to the gradual phase-out of that type of lottery game in Canada.

Winning numbers are drawn by the Interprovincial Lottery Corporation (ILC) every Wednesday and Saturday, executed with a random number generator.

== Gameplay ==
As of the September 14, 2022 draw, the game consists of two components:

- The "Gold Ball Draw", which is a raffle prize of at least $1 million that is awarded during each draw. Some drawings (promoted as a "Superdraw") offer multiple secondary raffle prizes.
- The "Classic Draw", in which six numbers are drawn from a set of 49. If a ticket matches all six numbers, a fixed prize of CA$5 million is won. A bonus number is also drawn, and if a player's ticket matches five numbers and the bonus number, the player wins the "second prize" which is usually between $100,000 and $500,000. Should more than one player win the top or second prize, it is split amongst them. Lesser prizes are also awarded if one matches at least two numbers. Until the September 14, 2022 draw, the top prize of this drawing was the main jackpot, which began at $5 million and increased each time it was not won.

Beginning with the September 18, 2013 draw, a single entry costs $3, and a "guaranteed prize draw" for $1,000,000 was added during each drawing. Each entry includes one line of six numbers, and one entry into the raffle draw identified by a ticket number; this number can only be matched exactly, and does not offer secondary prizes for matching partial digits.

Beginning with the September 14, 2022 draw, the guaranteed prize draw—renamed the "Gold Ball Draw"—replaces what is now the "Classic Draw" as the means in which the main jackpot is awarded. As before, a raffle prize of $1 million is awarded during each draw. However, at least once every 30 draws, a larger jackpot will be randomly awarded to the Gold Ball Draw winner instead. The jackpot begins at $10 million, with a 1 in 30 chance that it will be awarded. If the jackpot is not awarded, the jackpot will increase by $2 million on the next drawing, and the probability of a jackpot win will improve. These changes prevent the main jackpot from increasing without limit for an arbitrarily long time, or being split between multiple tickets; the largest jackpot that can be awarded under the new format is $68 million.

Until May 2019, Lotto 6/49 and Lotto Max used a lottery machine to draw winning numbers. Since May 14, 2019, both games have switched to using a random number generator.

== Largest jackpots ==
Before the June 2004 increase in ticket prices from $1 to $2, the largest Lotto 6/49 jackpot was $26.4 million, on September 2, 1995.

Prior to the September 2022 change in format, the largest Lotto 6/49 jackpot was drawn on October 17, 2015 for $64 million. The jackpot was won by one ticket purchased in Mississauga, Ontario. The second largest Lotto 6/49 jackpot was $63.4 million on the draw for April 13, 2013. Until 2019, these were the two largest jackpots in Canadian history; by comparison, while Lotto Max has had a main prize pool as high as $128 million, that lottery has set a cap on its main jackpot (which was most recently raised from $60 million to $80 million, with the first $65 million and $70 million jackpots first hit in 2019 and 2020 respectively) with excess "main prize pool" money being assigned to supplemental "MaxMillions" prizes of $1 million each.

The third largest Lotto 6/49 jackpot was drawn on October 26, 2005. The single winning ticket, worth $54.3 million, was purchased in Camrose, Alberta by a group of 17 oil and gas plant workers. This was the largest Canadian lottery jackpot up to that time, and a significant increase from the previous record of $37.8 million on a Super 7 lottery draw in 2002—rapid sales created by lottery fever across the country pushed this 2005 Lotto 6/49 jackpot far beyond the originally estimated $40 million.

The Gold Ball Draw reached a 1 in 2 chance of awarding $66 million on the September 23, 2023 draw, the largest jackpot in Lotto 6/49 history. The jackpot was not awarded to the Gold Ball Draw winner, meaning that the maximum jackpot of $68 million was awarded for the first time during the September 27 draw. The winning ticket was sold in the Toronto area.

== Organization ==
The Lotto 6/49 game is administered by the Interprovincial Lottery Corporation, an alliance of the five regional lottery corporations in Canada.

Each of these corporations operate a regional add-on games that, for an extra $1 each, can be added to a 6/49 ticket. This "spiel" game (named "Tag", "Encore" or "Extra" depending on the region), adds a 6- or 7-digit number to the ticket with a top prize of $100,000 if all six digits are matched, or $250,000 to $1,000,000 depending on the region for a seven-number match ($1,000,000 in Ontario and Quebec; $250,000 in the Western Canada region of Alberta, Saskatchewan, Manitoba and the territories). In British Columbia, instead of a 6- or 7-digit number, players get a set of 4-numbers from 1 to 99, and matching all of them, result a $500,000 win.

Alongside the main Lotto 6/49 drawing, the regional corporations also run local versions of the game; Atlantic 49, Quebec 49, Ontario 49, Western 6/49, and BC 49. These draws are held on the same night as each Lotto 6/49 drawing, but with fixed jackpots of $2,000,000 (or $1,000,000 on Atlantic 49). Most of these regional games still use the prize structure used by the national game prior to September 18, 2013; Ontario 49 and Western 6/49 do use the current prize structure, adding a free play for matching two numbers. Most regional variants of 6/49 use only the Classic Draw format, although Atlantic 49 also offers a raffle prize of $25,649 on each drawing.

== Prizes and chance of winning ==
Number of matches	Win	Probability of winning on one play
6/6	Jackpot win or Share of 79.5% of the Pool's Fund	1 in 13,983,816
5/6 + Bonus	Share of 6% of the Pool's Fund	1 in 2,330,636
5/6	Share of 5% of the Pool's Fund	1 in 55,492
4/6	Share of 4% of the Pool's Fund	1 in 1,033
3/6	$10 prize	1 in 56.7
2/6 + Bonus	$5 prize	1 in 81.2
2/6	Free Play	1 in 8.3
Guaranteed Prize Draw (10 of 10) (exact match only)	$1,000,000	Variable

Overall odds of winning a prize are about 1 in 6.6, though the great majority of prizes consist of a free ticket for the next draw.

From the 2004 price change until September 18, 2013, this table was distributed thus:

Number of matches	Win	Probability of winning on one play
6/6	Jackpot win or Share of 80.5% of the Pool's Fund	1 in 13,983,816
5/6 + Bonus	Share of 5.75% of the Pool's Fund	1 in 2,330,636
5/6	Share of 4.75% of the Pool's Fund	1 in 55,492
4/6	Share of 9% of the Pool's Fund	1 in 1,033
3/6	$10 prize	1 in 56.7
2/6 + Bonus	$5 prize	1 in 81.2

Before July 2010, if there was no winning ticket for a jackpot of $30 million or higher, the following prize structure was applied to all subsequent draws until the jackpot was won. This did not apply to bonus jackpots.

Number of matches	Win	Probability of winning on one play
6/6	Jackpot win or Share of 40% of the Pool's Fund	1 in 13,983,816
5/6 + Bonus	Share of 16% of the Pool's Fund	1 in 2,330,636
5/6	Share of 15% of the Pool's Fund	1 in 55,492
4/6	Share of 29% of the Pool's Fund	1 in 1,033
3/6	$10 prize	1 in 56.7
2/6 + Bonus	$5 prize	1 in 81.2

The probability of winning some prize in one play is 1 in 32.3.

From the game's inception until the 2004 price change, the prize pool consisted of 45% of sales, and was distributed thus:

Number of matches	Win	Probability of winning on one play
6/6	Jackpot win or Share of 50% of the Pool's Fund	1 in 13,983,816
5/6 + Bonus	Share of 15% of the Pool's Fund	1 in 2,330,636
5/6	Share of 12% of the Pool's Fund	1 in 55,492
4/6	Share of 23% of the Pool's Fund	1 in 1,033
3/6	$10 prize	1 in 56.7

The overall odds of winning were 1 in 54.
