= Gold Horse Casino =

Casino in Saskatchewan, Canada

- Interactive map of Gold Horse Casino
- Location: 3910 41 Street Lloydminster, Saskatchewan S9V 2K8; 53.2760452°N 109.9801601°W
- Opened: December 21, 2018
- Casino type: Land
- Owner: Border Tribal Council
- Operating license holder: Saskatchewan Indian Gaming Authority
- Website: goldhorsecasino.ca

Gold Horse Casino is a First Nations casino located in Lloydminster, Canada, situated on the Saskatchewan side of the provincial border.

Operated by the Saskatchewan Indian Gaming Authority (SIGA), the 49,000-square-foot (4,600 m^{2}) facility broke ground on June 12, 2017, and opened to the public on December 21, 2018, after a formal opening ceremony on the 20th. Lloydminster MLA Colleen Young was in attendance for both events. It is Saskatchewan's seventh tribal casino, and includes a gaming floor with slot machines, 5 table games, and 18 electronic table games, as well as an events center, meeting area, and a bar and grill.

The facility is situated on land owned by the Little Pine First Nation, who holds the municipal service agreement with the city of Lloydminster. A consortium known as the Border Tribal Council (which includes the Beardy's, Canoe Lake, Lucky Man, Onion Lake, Pelican Lake, and Poundmaker nations among others) is the landlord and facility developer of the property, which is leased to the SIGA as operator.

== See also ==
- List of casinos in Canada
