= Lotteries and Gaming Saskatchewan =

Lottery company of Saskatchewan, Canada

- Formation: June 1, 2023; 3 years ago
- Headquarters: 2055 Albert Street, Regina, Saskatchewan
- Location: Regina, Saskatchewan, Canada
- Region served: Saskatchewan
- Website: https://lgsask.com/

Lotteries and Gaming Saskatchewan (LGS) is a Crown corporation owned by the Government of Saskatchewan. Established in 2023, it oversees lotteries and gambling in the province, including the province's gaming operators Sask Lotteries, Sask Gaming (which operates as a subsidiary), and the Saskatchewan Indian Gaming Authority (SIGA). LGA consolidates management roles that were formerly held by the Saskatchewan Liquor and Gaming Authority (SLGA) and the Minister of Parks, Culture, and Sport.

== History ==
Lotteries and Gaming Saskatchewan was announced in October 2022, consolidating oversight for lotteries and gaming in the province. LGS would oversee Sask Lotteries (run by Sask Sport in partnership with the Western Canada Lottery Corporation)—replacing the Minister of Parks, Culture, and Sport, as well as casinos, video lottery terminals and online gaming—replacing the Saskatchewan Liquor and Gaming Authority (SLGA). The SLGA would continue as an "independent regulator", and continue to oversee charitable gaming.

LGS began operations on June 1, 2023 as a designated subsidiary Crown corporation. Sask Gaming, which owns and operates Casino Regina and Casino Moose Jaw, became a wholly owned subsidiary of LGS; Minister of Crown Investments Don Morgan explained that the corporation would "will allow us to keep pace with the rapidly changing gaming landscape while maintaining the unique character of having distinct operators in the province."
