= Sports betting =

Form of gambling

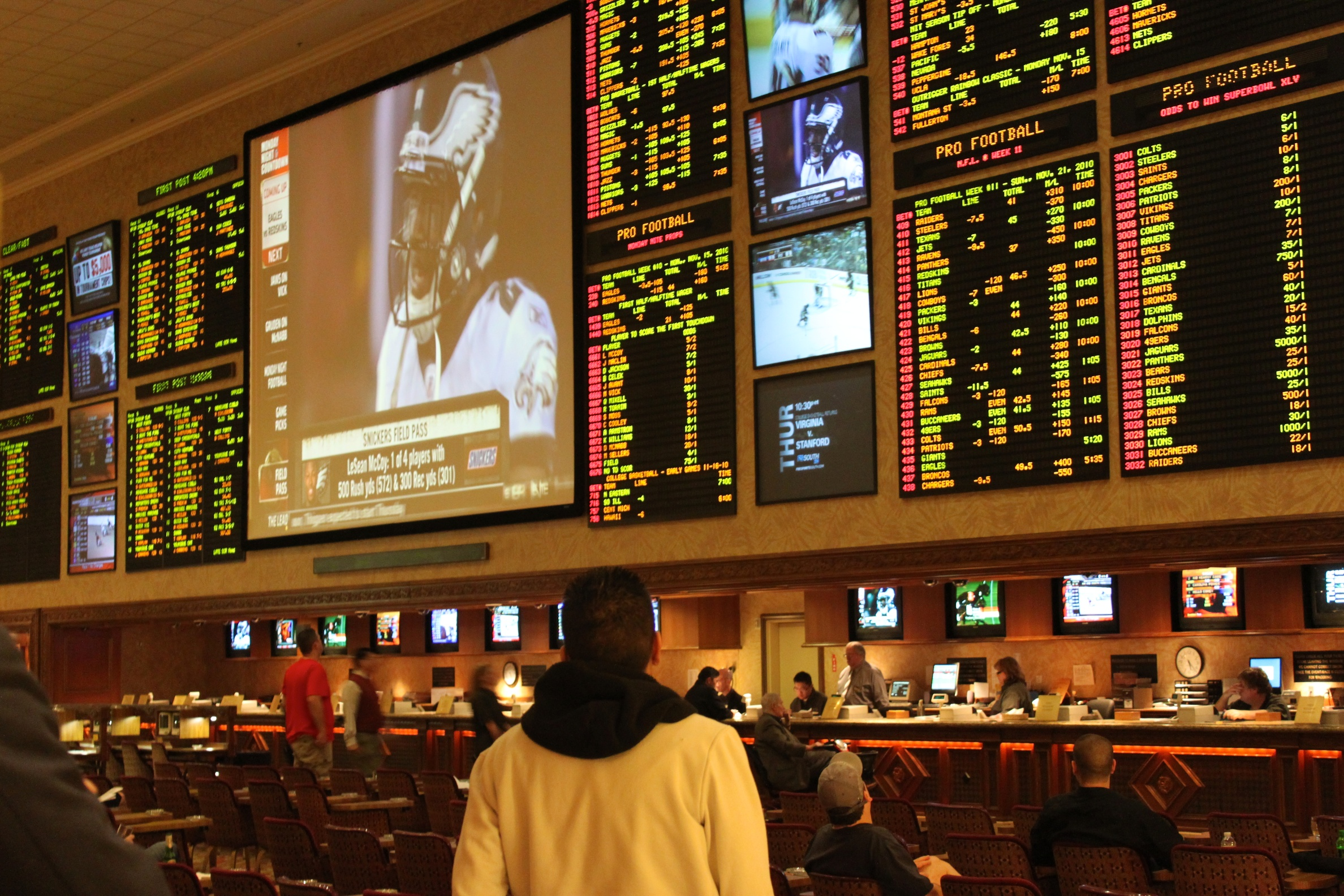
Odds boards in a Las Vegas sportsbook

Sports betting is the activity of predicting sports results and placing a wager on the outcome.

Sports bettors place their wagers either legally, through a sportsbook or bookmaker (colloquially known as "bookies"), or illegally through privately run enterprises. The term "book" is a reference to the books used by wage brokers to track wagers, payouts, and debts. Many legal sportsbooks are found online, operated over the Internet from jurisdictions separate from the clients they serve, usually to get around various gambling laws (such as the Unlawful Internet Gambling Enforcement Act of 2006 in the United States) in select markets, such as Las Vegas, or on gambling cruises through self-serve kiosks. There are different types of legalized sports betting now such as game betting, parlays, props, and future bets. They take bets "up-front", meaning the bettor must pay the sportsbook before placing the bet. Due to the nature of their business, illegal bookies can operate anywhere but only require money from losing bettors and do not require the wagered money up front, creating the possibility of debt to the bookie from the bettor. This creates a number of other criminal elements, thus furthering their illegality.

There have been a number of sports betting scandals, affecting the integrity of sports events through various acts including point shaving (players affecting the score by missing shots), spot-fixing (a player action is fixed), bad calls from officials at key moments, and overall match-fixing (the overall result of the event is fixed). Examples include the 1919 World Series, the alleged (and later admitted) illegal gambling of former baseball player Pete Rose, and former NBA referee Tim Donaghy.

== Types of sports bets in the United States ==
This is a list of sports bet types common to the United States.

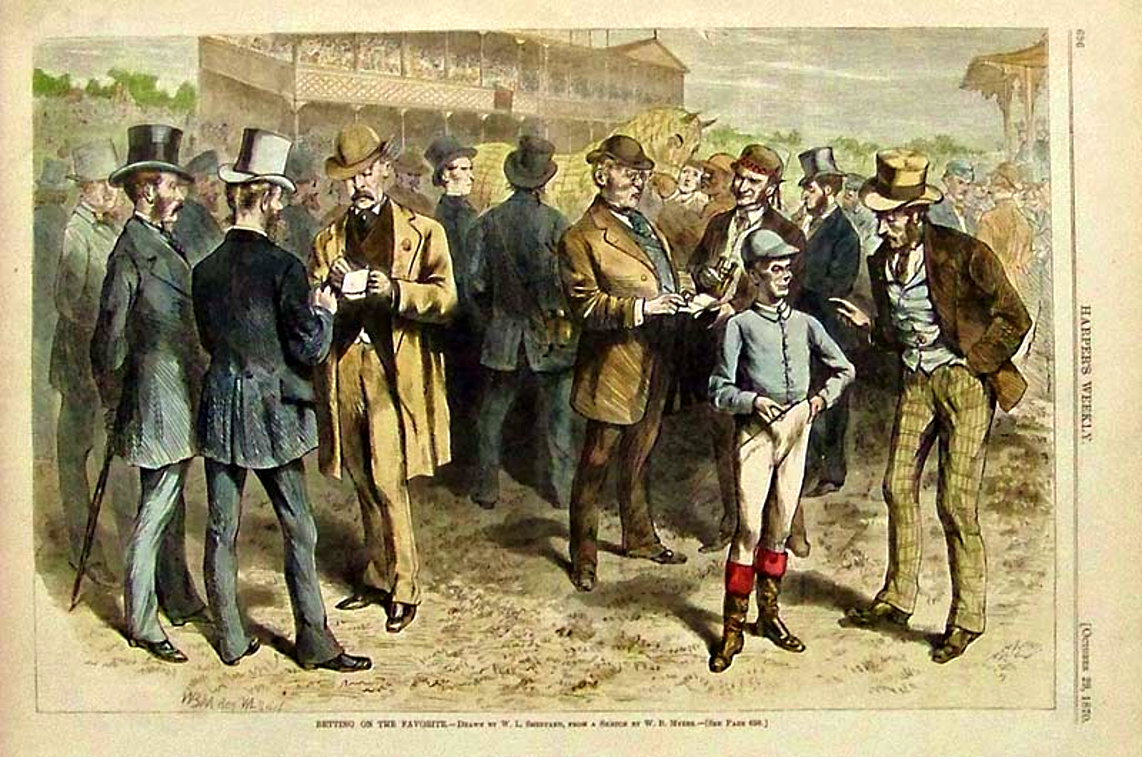
Betting on the Favorite, an 1870 engraving published in Harper's Weekly

- Moneyline bets do not have a spread or handicap, and require the chosen team to win the game outright. The favored team pays lower odds than does the underdog; thus, it acts mainly as an enticement to take the underdog for a better payout, to make more money. Sometimes a bettor may couple this type of bet on the favored team to increase the payout of a parlay.
- Spread betting are wagers that are made against the spread (ATS). The spread, or line, is a number assigned by the bookmakers which handicaps one team and favors another when two teams play each other and one is perceived as being more likely to win. The favorite "gives" points from the final score, and the underdog "takes" points. This number can also be in increments of half-a-point (.5) even though very few sports have .5 point scoring (i.e., The Ryder Cup), to avoid the possibility of a tie.

For example, before game 5 of the 2012 NBA Finals, the Miami Heat were expected to beat the Oklahoma City Thunder. The line read: Miami −3.5, Oklahoma City +3.5. To determine who wins against the spread, the line is either added or subtracted from a team's final score. In the above example, if the bettor chose Miami, for him to win his bet, Miami would have to win the game by 4 points or more. If a bettor took Oklahoma City, they would have to win outright or lose by 3 points or fewer.
If the final adjusted score is a tie, the bet is considered a push. The half point at the end is sometimes added to eliminate the possibility of a push. This is the most common type of bet in American sports betting.

- Total (Over/Under) bets are wagers made based on the total score between both teams. In an example, if an MLB game has a total of 10.5, an over bettor will want the combined total to be greater, and the opposite for a bettor taking the under. If the combined total is the same as the proposed total, the bet is a push. Most sports books refund all wagers on pushes, though a minority counts them as losses.
- Proposition bets are wagers made on a very specific outcome of a match not related to the final score, usually of a statistical nature. Examples include predicting the number of goals a star player scores in an association football match, betting whether a player will run for a certain number of yards in an American football game, or wagering that a baseball player on one team will accumulate more hits than another player on the opposing team.
- Parlays. A parlay involves multiple bets that rewards successful bettors with a greater payout only if all bets in the parlay win. A parlay is at least two bets, but can be as many as the bookmaker will allow.

The possible payout of the parlay is determined by the combined likelihood of all bets placed. A parlay of riskier bets (more underdogs) will pay greater than a parlay of more likely bets (more favorites). In a parlay, all bets need to win in order for the parlay to win. If one of the bets on a parlay loses, the whole parlay loses. In the event of a push, the pushed bet would be taken out of the parlay and the parlay would bump down to a set of odds without that bet.
Parlays are very appealing to bettors because they pay out much more than the total winnings of their constituent straight bets. However, it is much more difficult to hit on a parlay than it is on a single wager. In some states, parlays account for a substantial share of sportsbook revenue. In Louisiana, for example, parlays accounted for 70% of online sportsbook revenue during fiscal year 2024, according to the Louisiana Gaming Control Board.

- Teasers. A teaser is a parlay that gives the bettor an advantage at a lower, but still positive, payout if successful.

The bettor selects the sport(s), number of games, and number of points given.
If the bettor takes two NBA games at +6.5 it will adjust the individual bets at that rate. So a bet on a 3-point underdog at +3 will become a bet at +9.5 points, and for favorites, it will change a 3-point favorite at −3 to +3.5 points.
Although the rules to win his bet are the same as a parlay, he is paid less than a regular parlay due to the increased odds of winning.

- If bets. An if bet consists of at least two straight bets joined by an if clause, which determines the wager process. If the player's first selection complies with the condition (clause), then the second selection will have action; if the second selection complies with the condition, then the third selection will have action and so on.
- Run line, puck line, or goal line bets. These are wagers offered as alternatives to money line wagers in baseball, hockey, or soccer, respectively. These bets are effectively point spread bets that have the same money line odds on either side of the wager (i.e., industry standard of −110 to −115). Sportsbooks will occasionally shift the moneyline by a few points on either side of these spread bets.
- Futures wagers. While all sports wagers are by definition on future events, bets listed as "futures" generally have a long-term horizon measured in weeks or months; for example, a bet that a certain NFL team will win the Super Bowl for the upcoming season. Such a bet can be made before the season starts in September for the best possible payout, but futures are typically available year-round, with payouts being reduced as the season progresses and it becomes easier to predict a champion. In this example, winning bets will not pay off until the conclusion of the Super Bowl in January or February (although many of the losing bets will be clear well before then and can be closed out by the book). Odds for such a bet generally are expressed in a ratio of units paid to unit wagered. The team wagered upon might be 50–1 (or +5000) to win the Super Bowl, which means that the bet will pay 50 times the amount wagered if the team does so. In general, most sportsbooks will prefer this type of wager due to the low win-probability, and also the longer period of time in which the house holds the player's money while the bet is pending. These high odds help incise general betters to put money into a bet, because they place in little amounts of money for a chance to win a lot, even though the odds are unlikely. For this same reason, most professional bettors do not prefer to place futures bets.

A sportsbook may choose to buy in-play futures wagers at a price below the actual payout before a championship is decided if the potential payout is very high (and thus, damaging to the sportsbook due to the money that may be lost). The most recent example of this was when Leicester City pursued and went on to win the 2015/16 Premier League.

- Head-to-Head. In these bets, bettor predicts competitors results against each other and not on the overall result of the event. One example are Formula One races, where you bet on two or three drivers and their placement among the others. Sometimes you can also bet a "tie", in which one or both drivers either have the same time, drop out, or get disqualified.
- Totalizators. In totalizators (sometimes called flexible-rate bets) the odds are changing in real-time according to the share of total exchange each of the possible outcomes have received taking into account the return rate of the bookmaker offering the bet. For example: If the bookmakers return percentage is 90%, 90% of the amount placed on the winning result will be given back to bettors and 10% goes to the bookmaker. Naturally the more money bet on a certain result, the smaller the odds on that outcome become. This is similar to parimutuel wagering in horse racing and dog racing.
- Half bets. A half (halftime) bet applies only to the score of the first or second half. This bet can be placed on the spread (line) or over/under. This can also be applied to a specific quarter in American football or basketball, a fewer number of innings in baseball, or a specific period in hockey.
- In-play betting. In-play betting, or live betting, is a fairly new feature offered by some online sports books that enables bettors to place new bets while a sporting event is in progress. In-play betting first appeared towards the end of the 1990s when some bookmakers would take bets over the telephone whilst a sports event was in progress, and has now evolved into a popular online service in many countries. The introduction of in-play betting has allowed bookmakers to increase the number of markets available to bet on during sports events, and gamblers are able to place bets based on many types of in-game activity during the matches. For example, in football matches, it is possible to bet in on in-play markets including the match result, half-time score, number of goals scored in the first or second half of the game, the number of yellow cards during the match, and the name of the goal scorers. The availability of a particular sport and in-play markets varies from bookmaker to bookmaker. In-play sports betting has structural characteristics that have changed the mechanics of gambling for sports bettors, as they can now place a larger number of bets during a single sports game (as opposed to a single bet on who is going to win). One of the most important differences between being able to place an in-running sports bet opposed to a pre-match bet is that the nature of the market has been turned what was previously a discontinuous form of gambling into a continuous one. The gambling study literature has suggested that in-play sports betting may offer more of a risk to problem gamblers because it allows the option for high-speed continuous betting and requires rapid and impulsive decisions in the absence of time for reflection. There are three different types of in-play sports betting products(cash out, Edit my Acca, and Edit my Bet).

- Cash Out. Cash Out betting functionality lets the user of a betting website take profit early if their bet is coming in, or get some of their stake back if their bet is going against them—all before the event is over. Cash Out offers are optionally made by the website in real time on some current bets held by the user and are optionally taken by the user by clicking on a button on the webpage to "Cash out". Cash Out sports betting functionality developed on digital betting websites after 2008 with the evolution of betting exchanges. It was later adopted by online sports books and suppliers of betting software. 'Cash out' is offered to users by online sportsbook operators based on the profitability of offering the option to the user to divest their existing bet on an outcome and is sometimes available on singles and multiples. It is regularly offered on a wide range of sports, including American football, tennis, horse racing, basketball, and most other markets. You can Cash Out of bets pre-play, in-play, and between legs, before the outcome of the event. It has proved a key customer retention tool for sports book operators looking to capitalize on the use of mobile handsets while the bettor/user is also watching a given event.
- Edit My Acca. This feature allows gamblers to remove selections from their accumulator after the bet has been placed and in some instances after the selected event has started. The betting slip is then revised to feature the amended selections and a new potential return amount. This can be done online or via a mobile device.
- Edit My Bet. The "edit bet" feature can be used by gamblers to "unsettle straight accumulators" before matches have started or whilst they are in-play. The feature can also be used for to swap single bets for new bets, and the gambler is given a new bet selection valued at the bookie's cash out price to reflect live market/game odds for the original bet.

== Bookmaking ==
The bookmaker functions as a market maker for sports wagers, most of which have a binary outcome: a team either wins or loses. The bookmaker accepts both wagers, and maintains a spread (the vigorish) which will ensure a profit regardless of the outcome of the wager. The Federal Wire Act of 1961 was an attempt by the US government to prevent illegal bookmaking. However, this Act does not apply to other types of online gambling. The Supreme Court has not ruled on the meaning of the Federal Wire Act as it pertains to online gambling.

Bookmakers usually hold an 11–10 advantage over their customers—for small wagers it is closer to a 6–5 advantage—so the bookmaker will most likely survive over the long term. Successful bookmakers must be able to withstand a large short term loss. (Boyd, 1981)

Many of the leading gambling bookmakers from the 1930s to the 1960s got their start during the prohibition era of the 1920s. They were often descendants of the influx of immigrants coming into the US at this time. Although the common stereotype is that these bookies were of Italian descent, many leading bookies were of eastern European ancestry.

== Odds ==
Odds for different outcomes in single bet are presented either in European format (decimal odds), UK format (fractional odds), or American format (money line odds). European format (decimal odds) are used in continental Europe, Canada, and Australia. They are the ratio of the full payout to the stake, in a decimal format. Decimal odds of 2.00 are an even bet. UK format (fractional odds) are used by British bookmakers. They are the ratio of the amount won to the stake – the solidus "/" is pronounced "to"; for example, 7/1 is "seven to one". Fractional odds of 1/1 are an even bet. US format odds are the amount won on a 100 stake when positive, and the stake needed to win 100 when negative. US odds of 100 are an even bet.

Decimal	Fractional	US	Hong Kong	Indo	Malay	Implied probability
1.50	1/2	−200	0.50	−2.00	0.50	1 in 1.5 = 67%
2.00	Evens (1/1)	+100	1.00	1.00	1.00	1 in 2 = 50%
2.50	3/2	+150	1.50	1.50	−0.67	1 in 2.5 = 40%
3.00	2/1	+200	2.00	2.00	−0.50	1 in 3 = 33%

Conversion formulas
x	To	Do this
Decimal	Fractional	x−1, then convert to fraction
Decimal	US	100(x−1) if x>2; −100/(x−1) if x<2
Fractional	Decimal	divide fraction, then x+1
Fractional	US	divide fraction, then 100x if x≥1; −100/x if x<1
US	Decimal	(x/100)+1 if x>0; (−100/x)+1 if x<0
US	Fractional	x/100 if x>0; −100/x if x<0; then convert to fraction
Decimal	Hong Kong	x−1
Hong Kong	Indo	x if x≥1; −1/x if x<1
Hong Kong	Malay	x if x≤1; −1/x if x>1

In Asian betting markets, other frequently used formats for expressing odds include Hong Kong, Malaysian, and Indonesian-style odds formats. Odds are also quite often expressed in terms of implied probability, which corresponds to the probability with which the event in question would need to occur for the bet to be a break-even proposition (on the average).

Many online tools also exist for automated conversion between these odds formats.

In setting odds, the bookmaker is subject to a number of limitations:

- The probability implied by the odds should be greater than the true probability for each possible outcome to guarantee positive expected profit.
- If the wagers on each outcome are made in ratio to the implied odds, then the bookmaker is guaranteed a profit (balanced book).

== Legality and regulation ==
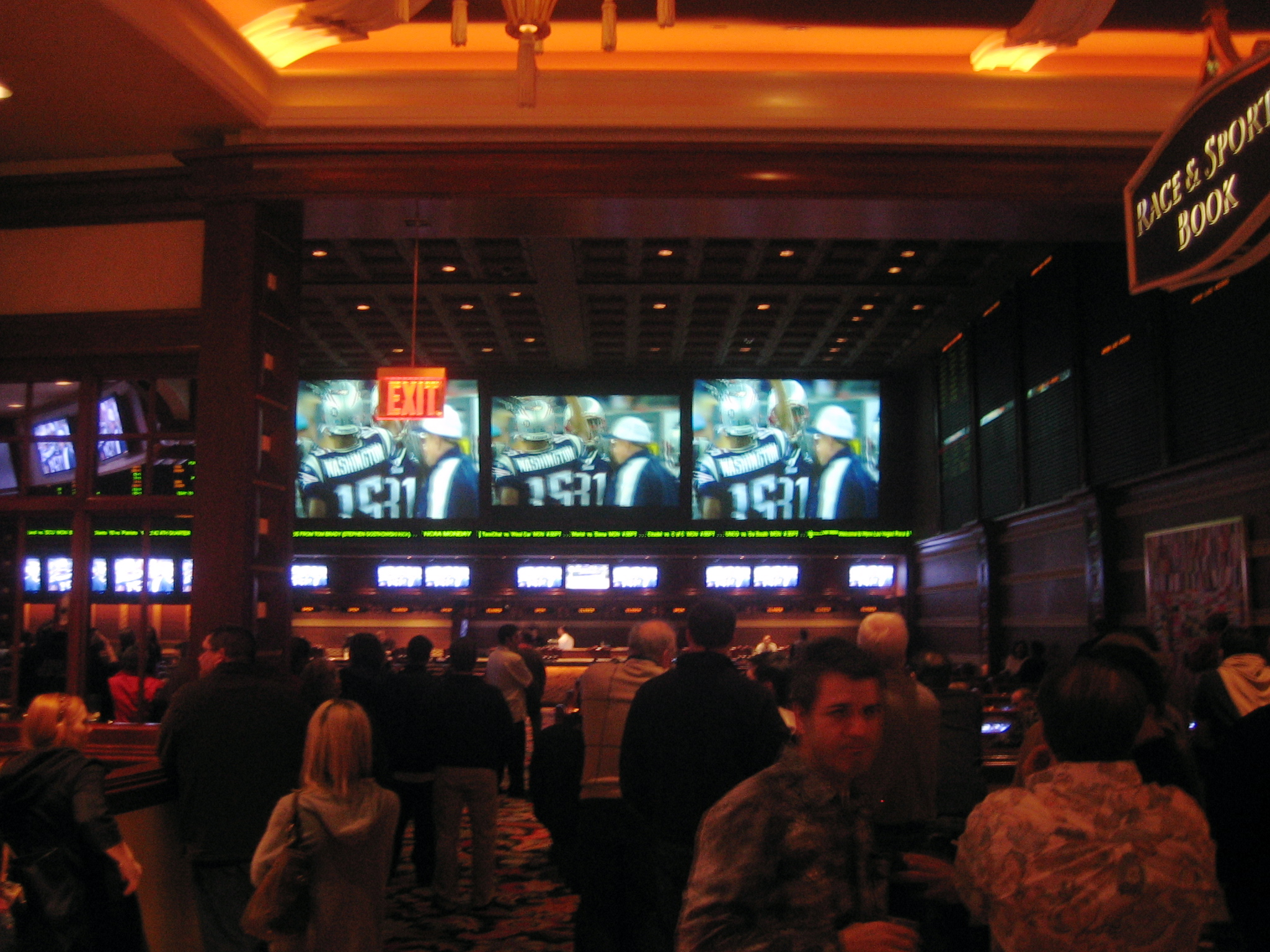
Sportsbook at Wynn Las Vegas, during Super Bowl XLII, February 2008

In many countries, bookmaking (the profession of accepting sports wagers) is regulated but not criminalized. The opinions of betting from sport authorities are mixed.

=== Argentina ===
In Argentina, the legality of sports betting is mainly regulated at the provincial level, given the federal nature of the country which grants each of its provinces the autonomy to legislate on gambling. This has resulted in a diverse landscape of sports betting regulation, with some provinces allowing and regulating sports betting extensively, while others maintain tighter restrictions. At the national level, there are efforts to create a more uniform regulatory framework, particularly for online sports betting, which has gained popularity and presents new regulatory challenges. The lack of cohesive federal legislation on online sports betting has led to a fragmented approach, although several provinces have begun to license online operators, seeking to regulate the market and provide consumer protections.

=== Brazil ===
In December 2023, Brazil enacted Law No. 14,790/2023, establishing a federal regulatory framework for fixed-odds sports betting and e-sports. The law authorizes both land-based and online betting, under the supervision of the Ministry of Finance and its Prizes and Betting Secretariat.

Licensed operators must be based in Brazil, meet anti-money laundering and consumer protection requirements, and are restricted from using credit cards or cryptocurrencies. Only ".bet.br" domains are permitted. Operators are taxed on gross gaming revenue, and player winnings are subject to income tax.

The regulated market launched in January 2025 with 14 companies granted full licences and over 50 operating under provisional status. Early market entrants included Betano, Bet365, Betsson, Sportingbet, Superbet, KTO, and Betfair.

=== Canada ===
Under the Criminal Code, provincial governments have the exclusive right to operate and license gambling in Canada. Legal sports betting is typically conducted through provincial lotteries via games promoted under brands such as Sport Select and Pro-Line. In 2021, the federal government passed legislation removing a long-standing prohibition of single-game betting from the Criminal Code.

British Columbia, Manitoba, and Saskatchewan (via the Saskatchewan Indian Gaming Authority) offer online sportsbooks exclusively via PlayNow.com, Alberta offers them exclusively via Play Alberta, Quebec offers them exclusively via Espacejeux, and Atlantic Canada offers them exclusively via the Atlantic Lottery Corporation. These services enjoy a legal monopoly; private operators are not allowed to offer online gaming in these provinces.

In April 2022, Ontario introduced a regulated internet gaming market open to third-party operators: in 2025, sports betting accounted for around $12 billion in wagers in Ontario's regulated market. In 2025, Alberta passed the iGaming Alberta Act, which will establish a similar model.

=== European Union ===
In the European Union (EU), sports betting legality varies among member states. Generally, the EU does not criminalize sports betting, but requires operators to obtain specific licenses within individual countries. Key directives, such as the Services Directive and consumer protection laws, influence the regulatory landscape. Each EU country sets its rules, impacting online and offline betting. Certain countries have recently updated regulations (such as the GlüStV 2021 in Germany), while the EU works to harmonize diverse laws.

=== India ===
The CEO of the International Cricket Council believe that sports betting, in particular in India, should be legalized to curb illegal bookies where match fixing has occurred from nontransparent bookmakers. According to the Law Commission of India, all forms of gambling are illegal. Online sports betting is a gray area and is not banned by any particular law in the Indian legal system. That is because specific provisions distinguish between games of chance and games of skill.

=== Spain ===
In Spain, sports betting is fully legal and regulated at the national level by the Dirección General de Ordenación del Juego (DGOJ), a body under the Ministry of Consumer Affairs. Since the passing of Law 13/2011 of 27 May on the regulation of gambling, the country has established a clear legal framework for the operation of sports betting both in physical establishments and on online platforms. This legislation covers licensing, advertising, and the protection of gamblers, ensuring a safe and responsible gambling environment. In addition, the regulations include measures to prevent pathological gambling and ensure that operators provide clear information on the odds and risks of gambling. In recent years, Spain has experienced a boom in sports betting, with a wide range of markets and events available to consumers. The DGOJ is responsible for monitoring and updating the relevant regulations to adapt to changes in the market and to protect the interests of players.

=== United States ===
Map of sports betting legality as of January 11, 2024 Sports betting legal Sports betting illegal

In the United States, it was previously illegal under the Professional and Amateur Sports Protection Act of 1992 (PASPA) for states to authorize legal sports betting, hence making it effectively illegal. The states of Delaware, Montana, Nevada, and Oregon—which had pre-existing sports lotteries and sports betting frameworks, were grandfathered in and exempted from the effects of the Act. PASPA was struck down by the Supreme Court in Murphy v. National Collegiate Athletic Association in 2018, paving the way for other states to legalize sports betting.

The United States National Football League was previously fully against any sort of legalization of sports betting prior to the late 2010s, strongly protesting it as to not bring corruption into the game. This was due to players joining in on bets which is illegal, and also it is changing the way players play the game.

In May 2020, it was reported that since the Supreme Court's PASPA decision, over $20 billion had been spent on sports betting in the United States. As of January 2024, 37 states, Washington, D.C., and the territory of Puerto Rico have operational legalized sports betting, while North Carolina has legalized it though it sports betting operations will begin later in 2024. 30 states, Washington D.C. and Puerto Rico have also legalized online sports betting, though in 8 states that have legalized sports betting, betting can only occur through legal physical sportsbooks.

A 2025 investigation by the Massachusetts Gaming Commission found that sports betting platforms often limited how much winning customers could bet while offering perks to customers who lost money.

=== Rest of the world ===
Outside the EU, regions approach sports betting differently. In Asia, some countries allow licensed betting while illegal markets thrive in others. Africa sees a growing industry with varying regulations. Australia boasts a well-regulated betting environment focusing on online and offline options. Latin America, led by countries like Colombia, is embracing regulated online markets. Meanwhile, the Middle East, including nations like Saudi Arabia and the UAE, strictly prohibits all gambling activities, including sports betting, due to cultural and religious reasons.

== American sports league positions ==
The positions of the four major American sports leagues (representing American football, baseball, basketball, and ice hockey) have become more complex since their decision to embrace daily fantasy sports (DFS) in 2014, which are described by those within the industry as "almost identical to a casino" in nature. With the contention by critics that such activities blur the lines between gambling and fantasy sports, the endorsement of all four major sports leagues and many individual franchises provided a marked contrast to their positions on betting. Professional sports leagues updated their positions again on May 14, 2018, when the Supreme Court of the United States overturned the Professional and Amateur Sports Protection Act of 1992 (PASPA).

=== NBA ===
While the National Basketball Association (NBA) was once active in preventing sports betting law relaxation, current NBA Commissioner Adam Silver became the first major sports leader to break from previous administrative opposition to gambling. In 2014 he stated in a New York Times op-ed, "I believe that sports betting should be brought out of the underground and into the sunlight where it can be appropriately monitored and regulated." In 2017, with support for legalization growing, he confirmed his belief that "legalized sports betting is inevitable".

Silver released the following statement following the Supreme Court's overturning of PASPA: "Today's decision by the Supreme Court opens the door for states to pass laws legalizing sports betting. We remain in favor of a federal framework that would provide a uniform approach to sports gambling in states that choose to permit it, but we will remain active in ongoing discussions with state legislatures. Regardless of the particulars of any future sports betting law, the integrity of our game remains our highest priority."

=== MLB ===
Major League Baseball (MLB) Commissioner Rob Manfred has also advocated the league changing its stance on sports betting, with both Manfred and Silver noting that the scale of illegal sports betting makes opposition to betting meaningless. He also stated a willingness to "try to shape" any future legislation at federal level. This was noted as a marked contrast to former Commissioner of the MLB Bud Selig, with Manfred going beyond tacit approval and stating, "There is this buzz out there in terms of people feeling that there may be an opportunity here for additional legalized sports betting."

MLB released the following statement when the Supreme Court overturned PASPA: "Today's decision by the United States Supreme Court will have profound effects on Major League Baseball. As each state considers whether to allow sports betting, we will continue to seek the proper protections for our sport, in partnership with other professional sports. Our most important priority is protecting the integrity of our games. We will continue to support legislation that creates air-tight coordination and partnerships between the state, the casino operators and the governing bodies in sports toward that goal."

In April 2022, league-owned television channel MLB Network launched Pregame Spread, a weekday afternoon show hosted by Matt Vasgersian dedicated to analysis of betting lines and other aspects of sports gambling.

=== NFL ===
The National Football League (NFL) remains the only sports league to maintain public opposition to sports betting, however critics have noted that with the move of the Oakland Raiders to Las Vegas in 2019, the NFL has positioned itself for legalization, while simultaneously contradicting its long-held position that sports betting in NFL markets would lead to potential match-fixing. Commissioner Roger Goodell agreed with Manfred in a July 2017 seminar that betting on in-game events, as opposed to the outcome of games, was a more palatable form of sports betting.

Like the NBA and MLB, the NFL issued a statement on May 21, 2018. It emphasized the league's commitment to protecting the integrity of the game: "The NFL's long-standing and unwavering commitment to protecting the integrity of our game remains absolute." Moreover, the NFL called on Congress to craft a Federal framework for regulated sports betting. "Congress has long recognized the potential harms posed by sports betting to the integrity of sporting contests and the public confidence in these events. Given that history, we intend to call on Congress again, this time to enact a core regulatory framework for legalized sports betting."

=== NHL ===
The National Hockey League (NHL) has not stated a public position for or against sports betting, with Commissioner Gary Bettman noting that they are smaller than the NBA and NFL and less vulnerable to negative issues as a result. The NHL was the first major professional league to place a team in Nevada, when the expansion Vegas Golden Knights took the ice in 2017: since then the league has signed sponsorship agreements with William Hill and MGM Resorts International that include betting partnerships and access to in-play data. Other clubs in states with legal sports gambling, such as the New Jersey Devils and Philadelphia Flyers, also have similar sponsorships with bookmakers.

Following other US professional sports leagues, the NHL acknowledged the Supreme Court's PASPA decision with an internal review of its policies. "The Supreme Court's decision today paves the way to an entirely different landscape – one in which we have not previously operated. We will review our current practices and policies and decide whether adjustments are needed, and if so, what those adjustments will look like. It's important to emphasize that the Supreme Court's decision has no immediate impact on existing League rules relating to sports wagering, and particularly, wagering involving NHL games."

=== Other leagues ===
Major League Soccer (MLS) the top soccer league in the United States and Canada has expressed sports betting as a possible way to gain popularity. Commissioner Don Garber has stated about sports gambling, "We have a project going on now to really dig in deeply and understand it. I'll join the chorus of saying it's time to bring it out of the dark ages. We're doing what we can to figure out how to manage that effectively."

The Alliance of American Football and XFL have both publicly endorsed gambling on their games, with the AAF securing a partnership with MGM Resorts International and the XFL partnering with DraftKings.

=== Advocacy and lobbying ===
The American Gaming Association stated in June 2017, that a coalition will advocate for the repeal of the United States' sports betting ban.

In February 2018, a lobbying document surfaced advocating a new position held by the NBA and MLB – that sports leagues should be financially compensated for betting activity.

== Position of the National Collegiate Athletic Association ==
Perhaps the most extreme ban on sports betting was imposed by the NCAA, the main governing body for U.S. college sports. The NCAA reified its position in the wake of various betting scandals, including two high-profile men's basketball episodes in the 1990s—the 1992 University of Nevada, Las Vegas and 1994 Arizona State University point shaving scandals. As states began legalizing sports betting in the late 2010s, the NCAA signaled a shift in tone. In 2017, then-NCAA President Mark Emmert talked about Las Vegas possibly hosting the NCAA Division I men's basketball tournament in the future.

Emmert acknowledged the Supreme Court's overturn of PASPA on May 14, 2018, restating the NCAA's strong commitment to competition and its student-athletes. "Our highest priorities in any conversation about sports wagering are maintaining the integrity of competition and student-athlete well-being." Emmert also emphasized the importance of proper federal regulation. "While we recognize the critical role of state governments, strong federal standards are necessary to safeguard the integrity of college sports and the athletes who play these games at all levels."

Three days after the Supreme Court ruling, the NCAA suspended its policy prohibiting championship events from being held in states with legal sports betting. The policy was fully rescinded in May 2019. In October 2020, Las Vegas was awarded the West Regional of the 2023 Division I men's basketball tournament; the Frozen Four, the final phase of the Division I men's hockey tournament, in 2026; and the men's basketball Final Four in 2028.

As of the 2024–25 school year, the official manuals for all three NCAA divisions still expressly banned a member institution's athletic department staff, non-athletic staff with responsibilities related to athletic activities, athletic conference staff, and student athletes from knowingly participating in sports wagering activities.

This ban covered all competitions, whether intercollegiate, amateur, or professional, as well as team practices, in any sport in which the NCAA conducts a championship, plus Division I FBS football (whose championships have never been operated by the NCAA) and all sports within the scope of the NCAA Emerging Sports for Women program. The only exception is traditional wagers between institutions, most commonly associated with rivalries or bowl games; according to the NCAA, "items wagered must be representative of the involved institutions or the states in which they are located".

The NCAA maintained that "Sports wagering has the potential to undermine the integrity of sports contests and jeopardizes the well-being of student-athletes and the intercollegiate athletics community. It also demeans the competition and competitors alike by spreading a message that is contrary to the purpose and meaning of 'sport.'"

More recently, the NCAA changed its position regarding betting on professional sports. First, in 2023, Division I adopted new guidelines for reinstatement of student-athletes sanctioned for sports betting. Student-athletes in that division no longer faced permanent loss of eligibility for betting on professional sports; penalties varied by the cumulative amounts bet, with the maximum sanction being loss of 50% of a season of eligibility. In June 2025, the NCAA Division I Council introduced a proposal to eliminate the organization's ban on betting on professional sports for both student-athletes and institutional staff. The ban on betting on professional sports was fully lifted in October 2025, initially effective November 1, after approval by all three NCAA divisions—first Division I on October 8, followed by Divisions II and III on October 22. However, the Division I Board of Directors amended the effective date to November 22. According to the NCAA, "the Division I legislative process allows a rule change to be rescinded within 30 days of becoming final if two thirds of the division's members submit an electronic request supporting rescission." The 30-day window expires on November 21. The delay also affects the effective date for Divisions II and III. Coincidentally, the initial legislation had passed shortly before the announcement of the federal prosecution of several NBA figures for illegal gambling, including on basketball. This legislation is not retroactive, and all sanctions related to college sports betting remain in place.

== Positions of other sports leagues and governing bodies ==
=== English football ===
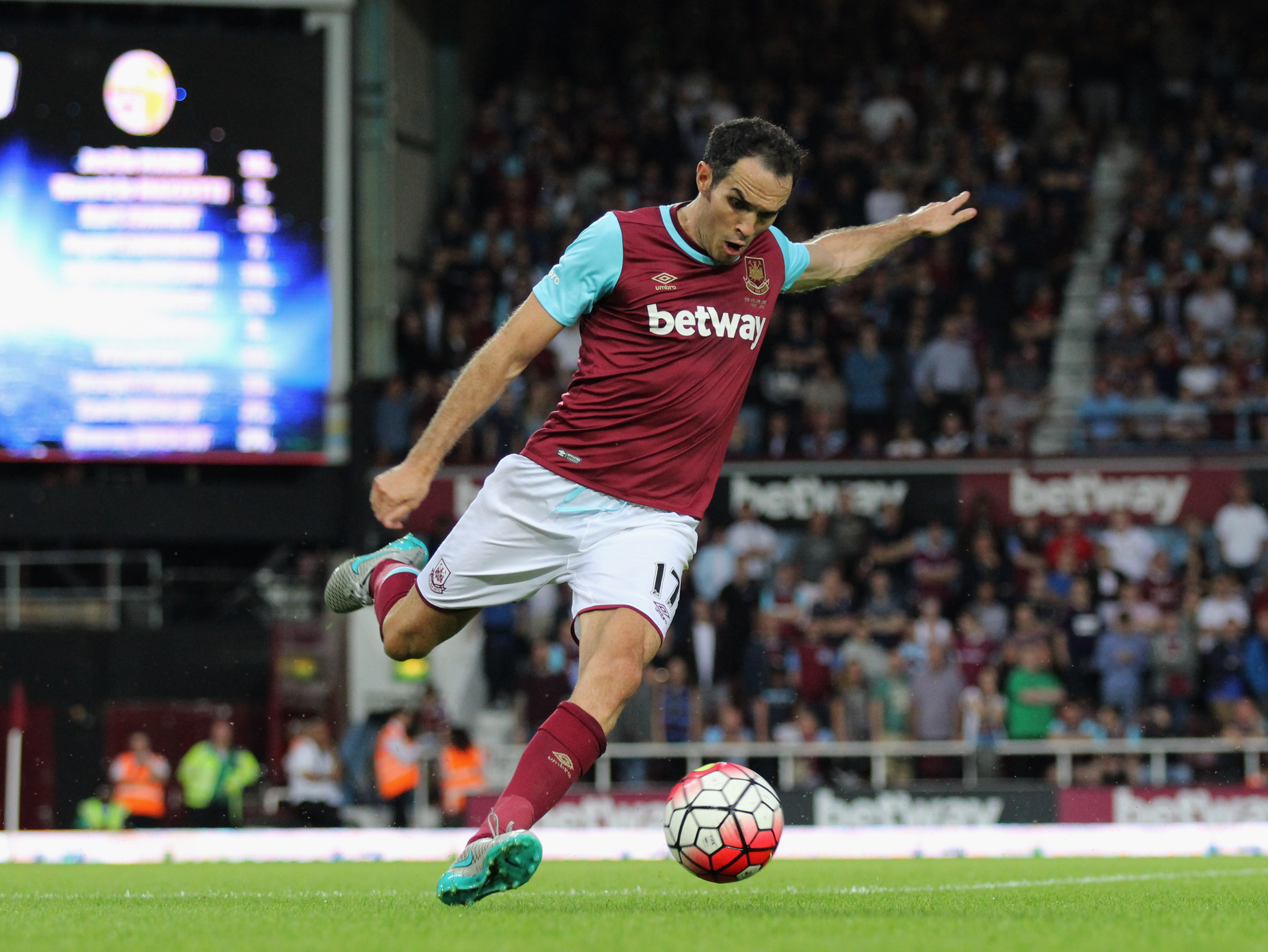
Premier League kit of West Ham United sponsorship by Betway

The Football Association, the governing body for association football in England, has imposed football betting bans on all individuals involved in the sport—players, managers, match officials, and club staff. The scope of these bans varies based on level of the English football pyramid.

The following individuals are banned from betting on any football-related matter worldwide, or providing inside information to any individual who can reasonably be assumed to use said information for betting purposes:

- All players, managers, and club staff associated with any club occupying any of the top eight levels of the men's league system (the Premier League, English Football League, and the top four levels of the National League system) or the top two levels of the women's league system (the Women's Super League and Women's Super League 2).
- All match officials, plus coaches and assessors thereof, who operate at Level 3 or above in the FA's referee classification system.

Individuals who are associated at clubs at lower levels of the men's or women's league systems, plus match officials at FA Level 4 or below, are only banned with respect to the match or competition in which they are involved or can influence, and also to the league in which they participate.

All individuals are banned from advertising or promoting any football betting activity in which FA regulations prohibit them from engaging. This, however, only applies to individuals in their personal capacities. For example, if a club is sponsored by a betting company and said company places its logo on the club's kit, the team's players are not in violation of the betting rules.

=== International baseball and softball ===
The World Baseball Softball Confederation, the international governing body for baseball and softball, has betting rules similar to those of Major League Baseball. Participants in any WBSC-sanctioned event are banned from betting on the following:

- Any WBSC competition in which they are participating.
- Any event in the participant's sport, even if not directly governed by WBSC. For example:
  - An individual involved with a national baseball team cannot bet on a Major League Baseball game.
  - However, someone involved solely with a national softball team can bet on an MLB game.
- Any event in any multisport competition in which an individual is participating. For example, an Olympic baseball or softball player cannot bet on any Olympic event taking place at that specific Summer Olympics.

The WBSC statutes define "participant" as any player, team staff member (including coaches/managers), tournament official (such as umpires and official scorers), or anyone in an ownership, executive, or staff role within any entity that organizes or promotes a WBSC-sanctioned event.

The betting ban, as in the case of The FA's rules outlined above, also extends to providing inside information that the tipper could reasonably believe will be used to bet on a WBSC event.

=== Cricket ===
The International Cricket Council imposes a blanket ban on what it calls "corrupt conduct" by anyone it defines as a "participant".

Under the ICC anti-corruption statutes, a "participant" is defined as:

- Anyone who has been selected to play in any international or domestic match that falls under the jurisdiction of any national cricket federation (Note: In the context of cricket, a "national" federation includes governing bodies whose remit covers multiple territories, with the most notable examples being the England and Wales Cricket Board and the West Indies Cricket Board.) within the previous 24 months (defined by the ICC as a "player").
- Anyone who "is employed by, represents or is otherwise affiliated to" any international or domestic team falling under the jurisdiction of any national federation (defined by the ICC as "player support personnel"). Those who have served in such a role in the past remain subject to the code for 24 months after the end of their term.
- Any cricketer or player support staffer who is currently under a ban imposed for violations of the ICC anti-corruption code, or the equivalent code of any national federation.
- Any ICC administrative official, match referee, pitch curator (groundskeeper), player agent, umpire, or umpire support staffer.

The ICC shares anti-corruption jurisdiction with national cricket federations, all of which have anti-corruption rules substantially identical to those of the ICC. The ICC has elaborate mechanisms for determining whether it or a national federation will take action under the relevant anti-corruption code. In general, the ICC has either exclusive or priority jurisdiction over international matches, while national federations have responsibility for actions relating only to domestic matches.

The ICC code bans the following activities with regard to any international match, whether or not the participant had any involvement in said match, or any possible means of influencing the outcome:

- Any attempted or actual match fixing, including spot-fixing (i.e., manipulating a specific event within a match).
  - However, manipulation of international matches strictly for strategic or tactical reasons is specifically excluded from the anti-corruption code. Such actions instead constitute violations of the ICC's code of conduct.
- Seeking, offering, accepting, or agreeing to accept a bribe to fix a match or event within a match.
- Betting on any match, or on any event within a match. Soliciting such a bet is also banned.
- Misuse of inside information that could reasonably be used for betting purposes.
- Providing any benefits for the purpose of violating the code.
- Failing to report any attempted violation of the code by another individual, once the subject has become aware of it.

== Famous betting scandals ==
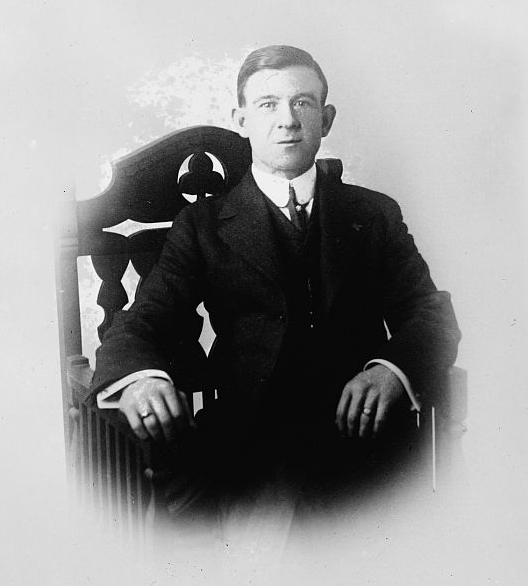
Joseph J. "Sport" Sullivan was an American bookmaker and gambler from Boston, Massachusetts who helped to initiate the 1919 Black Sox Scandal.

In 1919, the Chicago White Sox faced the Cincinnati Reds in the World Series. This series would go down as one of the biggest sports scandals of all time. As the story goes, professional gambler Joseph Sullivan paid eight members of the White Sox (Oscar Felsch, Arnold Gandil, Shoeless Joe Jackson, Fred McMullin, Charles Risberg, George Weaver, and Claude Williams) around 10,000 dollars each to fix the World Series. All eight players were banned from playing professional baseball for the rest of their lives. Pete Rose, the all-time MLB leader in hits, was similarly banned from baseball in 1989 for betting on games while he was an MLB manager.

The rule against gambling in baseball is known as "Rule 21", which is publicly posted on dugout walls and states: "Any player, umpire, or club or league official or employee, who shall bet any sum whatsoever on any baseball game in connection with which the bettor has a duty to perform shall be declared permanently ineligible." People permanently banned from Major League Baseball are also forever banned from entry into the Baseball Hall of Fame, although most such people have been reinstated a few years later by a later Commissioner of Baseball. For instance, while Mickey Mantle and Willie Mays were both banned from baseball in 1983 after taking jobs as casino greeters, they were reinstated two years later.

A 1906 betting scandal between the Massillon Tigers and Canton Bulldogs, two of the top teams in professional American football in the early 1900s, led to the demise of "big-money" professional football for several years. Modern research has suggested that the claims of betting were unsubstantiated.

On December 7, 1980, the San Francisco 49ers overcame a halftime deficit of 28 points in what became the greatest regular season comeback victory in NFL regular season history. By the beginning of the third quarter, notorious Vegas bookmaker Frank Rosenthal received forfeiture notices from 246 San Francisco bettors totaling more than $25,000 in premature winnings. Rosenthal was able to retain these winnings despite the outcome of the game due to gambling regulations previously established by the NAGRA.

The Cronje Affair was an India-South Africa Cricket match fixing scandal that went public in 2000. It began in 1996 when the-then captain of the South African national cricket team, Hansie Cronje, was convinced by Mukesh "John" Gupta, an Indian bookmaker, to throw a match during a Test in Kanpur, India. The scheme was discovered when Delhi police recorded illegal dealings between Indian bookmaker Sanjay Chawla and Cronje. According to the Telegraph in 2010, Cronje was paid off a total of £65,000 from Gupta.

Corruption in tennis has been long considered as issue. In 2011, the former world No. 55 Austrian tennis player, Daniel Köllerer, became the first tennis player to be banned for life for attempting to fix matches. The violations were outstanding between October 2009 and July 2010 after The Tennis Integrity Units had launched an investigation on behalf of the International Tennis Federation and the ATP and WTA tours. In 2004 and 2006, Koellerer was banned for six months due to his bad behavior. In addition, in August 2010, he facilitated betting by placing odds for matches and had links for placing bets.

== Machine learning in sports betting ==
Machine learning models can make predictions in real time based on data from numerous disparate sources, such as player performance, weather, fan sentiment, etc. Some models have shown accuracy slightly higher than domain experts.

== See also ==
- Arbitrage betting
- Betting pool
- Financial betting
- Friendly political wager
- Horse racing
- Parimutuel betting
- Point shaving
- Sports betting systems
- Statistical association football predictions
- Virtual sports

== Bibliography ==
- Boyd, Kier (1981). Gambling Technology Washington, D.C.: FBI Laboratory
- Davies, Richard (2001). Betting the Line Columbus, Ohio: The Ohio State University Press ISBN 0-8142-0880-0
- Finley, Peter (2008). Sports Scandals Westport, Connecticut: Greenwood Press ISBN 978-0-313-34458-9
- Rose, Pete (2004). My Prison Without Bars St. Martin's Press ISBN 1-57954-927-6
- Thompson, William (2001). Gambling in America—An Encyclopedia of History, Issues, and Society Santa Barbara, California: ABC-CLIO ISBN 1-57607-159-6
