= Lucky Man Reserve =

Indian reserve in Saskatchewan, Canada

Coordinates: 53°00′09″N 107°14′17″W

- Indian reserve
- Lucky Man Indian Reserve
- Location in Saskatchewan
- First Nation: Lucky Man
- Country: Canada
- Province: Saskatchewan
- Established: 1989

Area
  - Total: 3,078.6 ha (7,607 acres)

Population (2016)
  - Total: 0
  - Density: 0.0/km^{2} (0.0/sq mi)

The Lucky Man Reserve is an Indian reserve of the Lucky Man Cree Nation in Saskatchewan. It consists of Sections 25 to 36, Township 46, Range 6, west of the Third Meridian. In the 2016 Canadian Census, it recorded a population of 0 living in 0 of its 0 total private dwellings.

Chief Lucky Man was one of the first adherents to Treaty 6, but his application for a reserve was originally denied. The Lucky Man Cree Nation was re-established in the 1970s, after years of its descendants living on Little Pine 116, and found eligible for a treaty land entitlement claim. In 1989, the band's application for the Mayfair provincial pasture was approved. Few members live on the reserve today.

== See also ==
- List of Indian reserves in Saskatchewan
