= PlayNow.com =

Online casino

- Website type: Online casino
- Owner: British Columbia Lottery Corporation
- Website: www.playnow.com
- Launched: 2004

PlayNow.com is an online gambling website owned and operated by the British Columbia Lottery Corporation (BCLC). Launched in 2004, it first expanded into online casino games in 2010 offering online table games, slots, and sports betting. The site has since expanded into other provinces in Western Canada, as part of partnerships with Manitoba Liquor & Lotteries Corporation and the Saskatchewan Indian Gaming Authority (SIGA).

== History ==
PlayNow first launched in 2004, initially allowing users to purchase BCLC lottery products online.

In July 2010, PlayNow added online blackjack, craps, and roulette, becoming the first legal online casino in Canada. The service cost $7.3 million and was developed with OpenBet.

Shortly after launch, PlayNow was taken offline. The operators initially attributed this to server load, then to a security flaw, a "defect in the error handling logic", that let users access other accounts; the BCLC said 134 accounts were affected. Privacy Commissioner Elizabeth Denham required the site to stay offline pending an independent review. The service resumed in August 2010.

In February 2011, PlayNow added online poker; via a platform operated by gaming vendor GTech, games would be linked with Loto-Québec's Espacejeux.

In January 2013, PlayNow expanded to Manitoba via a partnership with the Manitoba Lotteries Corporation.

In June 2021, the Parliament of Canada passed Bill C-218, repealing the Criminal Code prohibition on single-event sports betting and allowing provinces to regulate it directly. PlayNow subsequently began offering single-event sports betting. Within the first two months, British Columbians placed more than $25 million in single-event bets through the platform.

In November 2022, PlayNow launched in Saskatchewan; it is operated in partnership between the Saskatchewan Indian Gaming Authority (SIGA) and Sask Gaming, as part of an agreement reached with the provincial government in 2021.

== Player safety and security ==
PlayNow.com requires independent age and residency verification, and applies a 24-hour delay to increases in player-set deposit limits. The site keeps session logs and a 52-week purchase history, and links players to responsible-gambling information through BCLC's GameSense program.

== Regulatory oversight ==
BCLC uses a transaction monitoring system to identify and report suspicious transactions on PlayNow.com. Since April 2026, this activity has been overseen by the Independent Gambling Control Office, established under a new Gaming Control Act in place of the former Gaming Policy and Enforcement Branch.
