= Min-a-he-quo-sis 116C =

Indian reserve in Saskatchewan, Canada

Coordinates: 52°54′24″N 108°54′58″W

- Indian reserve
- Min-a-he-quo-sis Indian Reserve No. 116C
- Location in Saskatchewan
- First Nation: Little Pine
- Country: Canada
- Province: Saskatchewan

Area
  - Total: 503.9 ha (1,245 acres)

Population (2016)
  - Total: 0
  - Density: 0.0/km^{2} (0.0/sq mi)

Min-a-he-quo-sis 116C is an Indian reserve of the Little Pine First Nation in Saskatchewan. It is about 45 kilometres (28 mi) north-west of North Battleford. Uniquely, In the 2016 Canadian Census, it recorded a population of 0 living in 0 of its 0 total private dwellings. This adds it to the long list of "empty" Indian reserves.

== See also ==
- List of Indian reserves in Saskatchewan
