= Lucky Man Cree Nation =

Cree First Nation in Saskatchewan, Canada

- Band No. 341
- People: Cree
- Treaty: Treaty 6
- Headquarters: Saskatoon
- Province: Saskatchewan

Land
- Other reserve: Lucky Man Reserve
- Land area: 30.786 km^{2} (11.887 sq mi)

Population (2019)
- On reserve: 6
- Off reserve: 109
- Total population: 115

Government
- Chief: Crystal Okemow

Tribal Council
- Battlefords Tribal Council

The Lucky Man Cree Nation (Cree: ᐸᐯᐍ papêwê) is a Cree First Nation in Saskatchewan, Canada. After spending more than a hundred years illegally associated by Canada with the Little Pine First Nation, the band was awarded the Lucky Man Reserve, on the eastern border of the RM of Meeting Lake. The re-established nation has the smallest membership in Treaty 6.

== History ==
The nation is named for Chief Papaway, ᐸᐯᐍ papewê meaning "lucky man", headman for Little Pine when that group signed Treaty 6 at Fort Walsh in 1879. Settling near Battleford in 1883, he requested a reserve adjacent to Poundmaker, Little Pine, and Big Bear the following year. The government refused, on the grounds that the groups were too closely associated.

By 1919, the Lucky Man band had dwindled to a population of nine, living on the Little Pine reserve. In the 1970s, modern research by the Federation of Sovereign Indigenous Nations discovered that Lucky Man had signed Treaty 6 without receiving any land. This allowed the band's descendants to reorganize, in 1976, and file for treaty land entitlement.

Newly elected Chief Rod King petitioned all levels of government for a suitable reserve site, and in 1989 - more than 100 years after Lucky Man signed Treaty 6 - the band was awarded the Mayfair provincial pasture, consisting of 12 sections in the Thickwood Hills. Although few members reside there, numerous business ventures have been investigated for the land.
