= Peepeekisis Cree Nation =

First Nation in Saskatchewan, Canada

Peepeekisis Cree Nation Band No. 384
- People: Cree
- Treaty: Treaty 4
- Headquarters: Balcarres
- Province: Saskatchewan

Land
- Main reserve: Peepeekisis 81
- Other reserve(s): Treaty Four Reserve Grounds 77
- Land area: 112.587 km^{2}

Population (2021)
- On reserve: 726
- Off reserve: 2,422
- Total population: 3,148

Government
- Chief: Francis Dieter

Tribal Council
- File Hills Qu'Appelle Tribal Council

Peepeekisis Cree Nation (Band number 384)(Cree: ᐲᐦᐲᑭᓰᐢ, pîhpîkisîs, literal meaning: Sparrow Hawk) is a Cree First Nation in southern Saskatchewan, Canada. Its reserves include Peepeekisis 81; Treaty Four Reserve Grounds 77, which is shared with 32 other bands; and Peepeekisis Cree Nation, which is located 19 km (12 mi) east of Balcarres, Saskatchewan, on Highway 10.

== Population ==
A census report for 2021 by Indigenous and Northern Affairs Canada of the Government of Canada placed the total registered population at 3,148, with 726 people on a reserve or other band land and 2,422 off reserve.

== History ==
Chief Can-ah-ha-cha-pew (Making Ready the Bow) signed Treaty 4 on September 21, 1874. Upon his death, his son Peepeekisis (Sparrow Hawk) became chief, and that same year the band moved from the Cypress Hills to settle on a reserve in the File Hills, about 12 km (7.5 mi) east of Balcarres.

In 1896, when Indian Agent W.M. Graham arrived at the agency, the band was without a leader and was unable to prevent Graham’s creation of the File Hills Colony (1898) on the reserve. The plan brought young male industrial school graduates (members of bands other than Peepeekisis) to live, farm and eventually become members of the Peepeekisis Band. The original Peepeekisis Band members were displaced from their homes and deprived of the use of their communal lands. Their complaints led in 1945 to questions raised about the validity of the transfers into the band, but it was not until 1986 that they were able to submit a specific claim to the Department of Indian Affairs.

In 2004, the Indian Claims Commission found Canada in breach of its lawful obligations to the band, and recommended that the claim be accepted for negotiation under Canada’s Specific Claims Policy. It has yet to be settled. The reserve covers 112.587 km^{2} (43.470 sq mi), with an additional share in the 0.992 km^{2} (0.383 sq mi) of the Treaty 4 Reserve Grounds (Fort Qu’Appelle). The band’s infrastructure includes a band office, gymnasium, school, health clinic, and other maintenance facilities; it has a membership of 2,215 people, 607 of whom live on reserve.\

In 2021, the Peepeekisis Cree Nation and the federal government reached a $150 million settlement. On August 3, 2022, Marc Miller, the Minister of Crown–Indigenous Relations, apologized in Peepeekisis Cree Nation, acknowledging that the federal government's "radical social engineering" had resulted in cultural loss through restrictive land and household access as well as a ban on cultural practices.

In September 2022, the Peepeekisis Cree Nation completed its acquisition of the Temple Gardens Hotel & Spa in Moose Jaw.
