= Saskatchewan Liquor and Gaming Authority =

Crown corporation of Saskatchewan

- Company type: Crown Corporation
- Industry: Beverages and Gaming regulation
- Headquarters: Regina, Saskatchewan
- Key people: Susan Ross, President and CEO
- Products: Alcohol control and sales, gambling/gaming regulation
- Website: Saskatchewan Liquor and Gaming Authority

The Saskatchewan Liquor and Gaming Authority (SLGA) is a Treasury Board Crown corporation responsible for the distribution, control and regulation of alcoholic beverages and cannabis, and the regulation of lotteries and gaming in the Canadian province of Saskatchewan. Its head office is located in Regina.

SLGA is the main distributor of and sole licensing agent for the sale of beverage alcohol in Saskatchewan, and oversees licensed commercial liquor stores across the province. SLGA formerly operated a network of retail liquor stores in communities around Saskatchewan. In November 2015, prior to the 2016 provincial election, the Saskatchewan Party government announced plans to privatize at least 40 of the 75 liquor stores the SLGA ran, but that these plans would not be realized until after the election. In November 2016, it was announced that 39 stores would be privatized and sold to various owners, and that 11 new private stores would be authorized. The new private owners included have included commercial companies Sobeys, entrepreneurs (with some of the stores having been bought out by former employees) and co-operatives (such as members of the Federated Co-operatives system).

On October 26, 2022, it was announced that the SLGA would exit the retail market and privatize all other liquor stores in the province, while maintaining a wholesale role. Furthermore, it was announced that a new crown corporation known as Lotteries and Gaming Saskatchewan (LGS) would assume the role of overseeing Sask Lotteries (in association with Sask Sport and the WCLC, which was formerly operated under the oversight of the Minister of Parks, Culture, and Sport), casinos, video lottery terminals, and internet gaming in the province, with the SLGA becoming an independent regulator, and continuing to directly manage charitable gaming. LGS began operations on June 1, 2023.
