= Min-a-he-quo-sis 116A =

Indian reserve in Saskatchewan, Canada

Coordinates: 53°04′54″N 109°02′25″W

- Indian reserve
- Min-a-he-quo-sis Indian Reserve No. 116A
- Location in Saskatchewan
- First Nation: Little Pine
- Country: Canada
- Province: Saskatchewan

Area
  - Total: 260.8 ha (644 acres)

Min-a-he-quo-sis 116A is an Indian reserve of the Little Pine First Nation in Saskatchewan.

== See also ==
- List of Indian reserves in Saskatchewan
