= Temple Gardens Hotel & Spa =

Hotel in Moose Jaw, Saskatchewan, Canada

- Former names: Temple Gardens Mineral Spa Resort
- Alternative names: Temple Gardens

General information
- Location: Moose Jaw, Saskatchewan, Canada, 24 Fairford St E Moose Jaw, Saskatchewan, Canada
- Coordinates: 50.3928°N 105.5335°W
- Owner: Peepeekisis Cree Nation

Technical details
- Floor count: 4

Other information
- Number of restaurants: 2

Website
- www.templegardenshotel.com

The Temple Gardens Hotel & Spa (formerly Temple Gardens Mineral Spa) is a hotel located in downtown Moose Jaw, Saskatchewan, Canada. The resort features 181 rooms, a spa, banquet facilities, a rooftop indoor/outdoor mineral pool, and is connected to Casino Moose Jaw.

== History ==
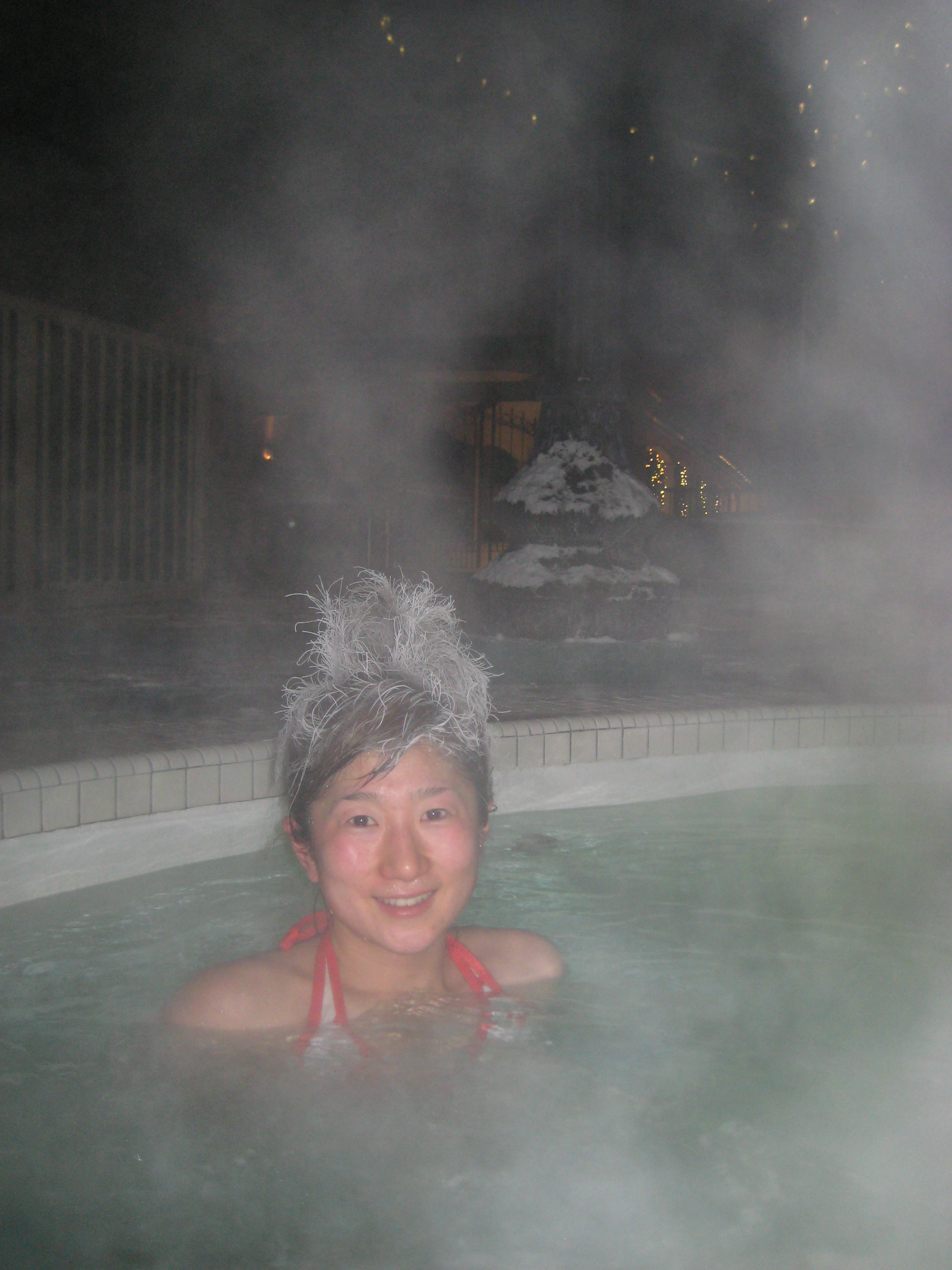
The spa in winter

In 1910 drillers, who were looking for oil, discovered the hot springs that now service the hotel. The springs waters originate from an ancient sea bed, called the Western Interior Seaway, 1,350 metres (4,430 ft) below the surface. The water travels under its own pressure through pipes to the spa, which is located about 400 metres (1,300 ft) away.

The hotel was originally built with 69 rooms at cost of $9 million; funds were a mixture of private and government investment. It is named after the historic Temple Gardens Dance Hall, one block north. The hotel was later expanded to 179 rooms.

On May 30, 1997, the final episode of CBC Radio's morning show Morningside was broadcast from Temple Gardens; host Peter Gzowski was a former editor of the Moose Jaw Times-Herald. The facility's café was renamed the "Morningsides Café" in his honour.

In 2006, the hotel was purchased by Temple REIT for $21 million. In 2022, Temple Hotels sold the hotel to Sparrow Hawk Developments—owned by the Peepeekisis Cree Nation, with Saskatoon-based Globex Management assuming operations. The new owners stated that there were plans for potential renovations in the future, but stated that they did not plan to change the property's name or theming. The first block of renovated rooms opened in July 2023, with the process expected to be completed in 2025.
