= Peepeekisis 81 =

Indian reserve in Saskatchewan, Canada

Coordinates: 50°52′33″N 103°23′14″W

- Indian reserve
- Peepeekisis Indian Reserve No. 81
- Location in Saskatchewan
- First Nation: Peepeekisis
- Country: Canada
- Province: Saskatchewan

Area
  - Total: 11,258.7 ha (27,821 acres)

Population (2016)
  - Total: 491
  - Density: 4.36/km^{2} (11.3/sq mi)
- Community Well-Being Index: 53

Peepeekisis 81 is an Indian reserve of the Peepeekisis Cree Nation in Saskatchewan. It is about 14 kilometres (8.7 mi) east of Fort Qu'Appelle. In the 2016 Canadian Census, it recorded a population of 491 living in 135 of its 146 total private dwellings. In the same year, its Community Well-Being index was calculated at 53 of 100, compared to 58.4 for the average First Nations community and 77.5 for the average non-Indigenous community.

== See also ==
- List of Indian reserves in Saskatchewan
