= Saskatchewan Indian Gaming Authority =

M.W.JULIAN [WJM]

The Saskatchewan Indian Gaming Authority (SIGA) is a First Nations gaming operator in the province of Saskatchewan. Owned by a consortium of the 74 First Nations band governments in Saskatchewan, it operates seven tribal casinos across the province, as well as the online casino PlayNow.com. Its operations are overseen by Lotteries and Gaming Saskatchewan (LGS).

Half of its revenues are distributed to Saskatchewan's First Nations communities via the First Nations Trust, while the remainder is distributed to community development corporations and the province's general revenue fund.

== History ==
SIGA opened its first property—the Bear Claw Casino near Moose Mountain Provincial Park on the land of the White Bear First Nations—in 1993.

In December 2018, SIGA opened its latest property, the Gold Horse Casino; it is situated on Little Pine First Nation land located within Lloydminster, managed by the Border Tribal Council.

In September 2021, the Federation of Sovereign Indigenous Nations reached an agreement with the provincial government to become the first licensed online gambling operator in Saskatchewan; the service would be overseen by SIGA and split its profits with the crown corporation Sask Gaming. The service launched in 2022 as a localized version of PlayNow.com, as part of a franchise agreement with the British Columbia Lottery Corporation (BCLC).

In fiscal year 2024–25, SIGA generated a record $378 million in gross revenue.

== Operations ==
- Bear Claw Casino & Hotel – White Bear First Nations
- Dakota Dunes Resort & Casino – Whitecap Dakota First Nation
- Gold Eagle Casino – North Battleford
- Gold Horse Casino – Little Pine First Nation (Lloydminster)
- Living Sky Casino – Swift Current
- Northern Lights Casino – Prince Albert
- Painted Hand Casino – Yorkton
- PlayNow.com (in partnership with Sask Gaming and BCLC)
