= Casino Moose Jaw =

Casino in Saskatchewan, Canada

- Interactive map of Casino Moose Jaw
- Location: Moose Jaw, Saskatchewan, Canada
- Address: 21 Fairford Street East; Moose Jaw, Saskatchewan; S6H 0C8
- Opening date: September 6, 2002
- Theme: Art Deco/Roaring Twenties
- Permanent shows: CMJ Lounge
- Casino type: Land
- Owner: Saskatchewan Gaming Corporation
- Coordinates: 50.3924°N 105.5334°W
- Website: www.casinomoosejaw.com

Casino Moose Jaw is located in downtown Moose Jaw, Saskatchewan, Canada, and is owned and operated by Sask Gaming. The government of Saskatchewan announced the construction of the $13 million facility on July 26, 2001. It was opened on September 6, 2002.

The casino has an Art Deco look inspired by the Roaring Twenties, a period of historic significance for the city. In addition to the gaming floor, the casino is connected to the Temple Gardens Hotel & Spa.

== See also ==
- List of casinos in Canada
