= Casino Regina =

Casino in Regina, Saskatchewan, Canada

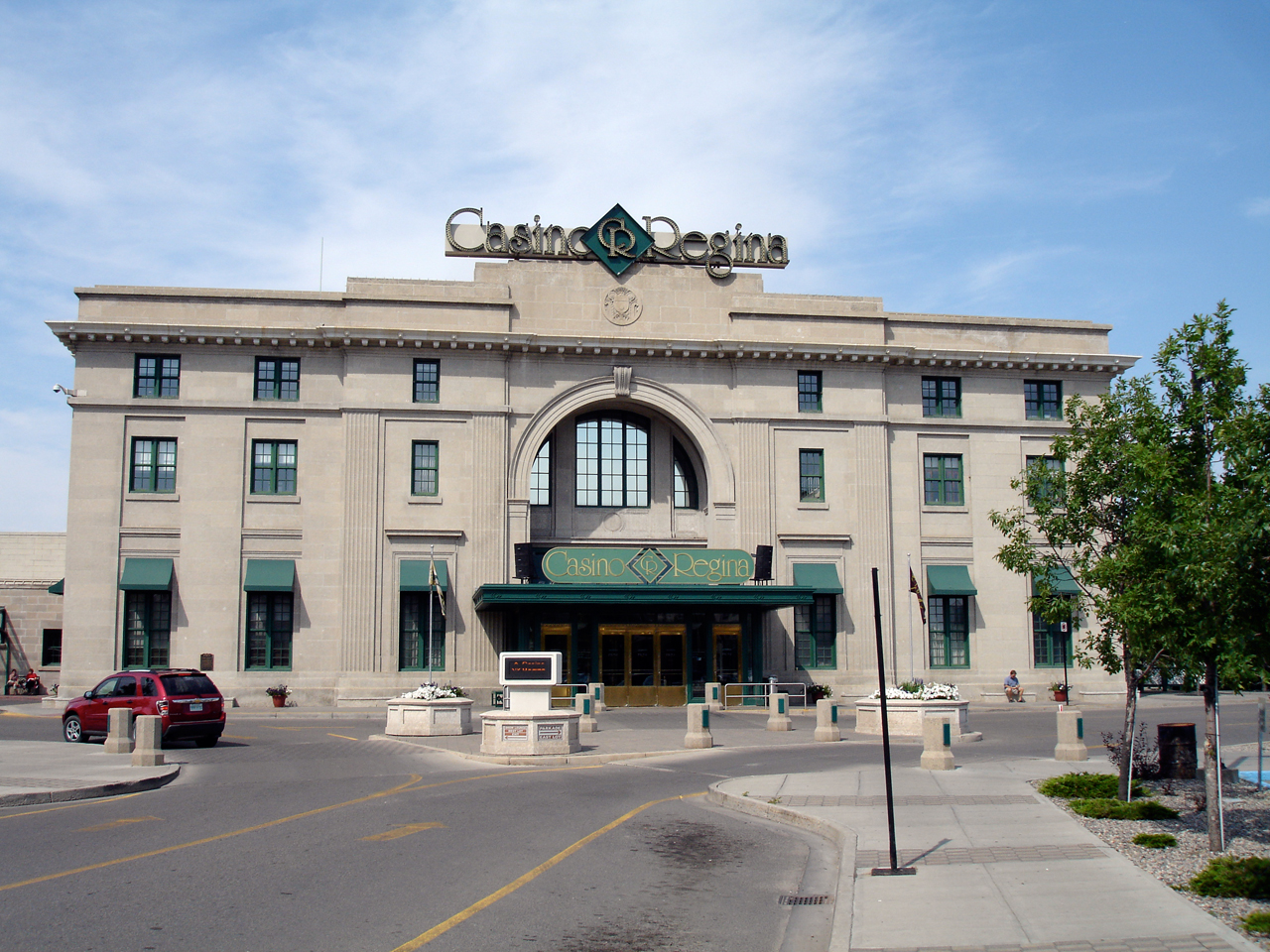
- Casino Regina
- Interactive map of Casino Regina
- Location: 1880 Saskatchewan Drive, Regina, Saskatchewan; 50.452737°N 104.608727°W
- Opened: January 26, 1996
- Theme: Union railway station (actual former use)
- Notable restaurants: Union Station Restaurant, Rail Car
- Casino type: Land
- Owner: Saskatchewan Gaming Corporation
- Architect: J.F. Orroch
- Previous names: Union Station (railway station)
- Renovated in: 1995 (converted to a casino), 2001, 2009, 2021
- Website: www.casinoregina.com

Casino Regina is a casino located on Saskatchewan Drive (formerly South Railway Street) in Regina, Saskatchewan, Canada. It operates in the city's former union station, a Tyndall and ashlar stone structure completed in 1912. The casino is owned and operated by Sask Gaming.

== History ==
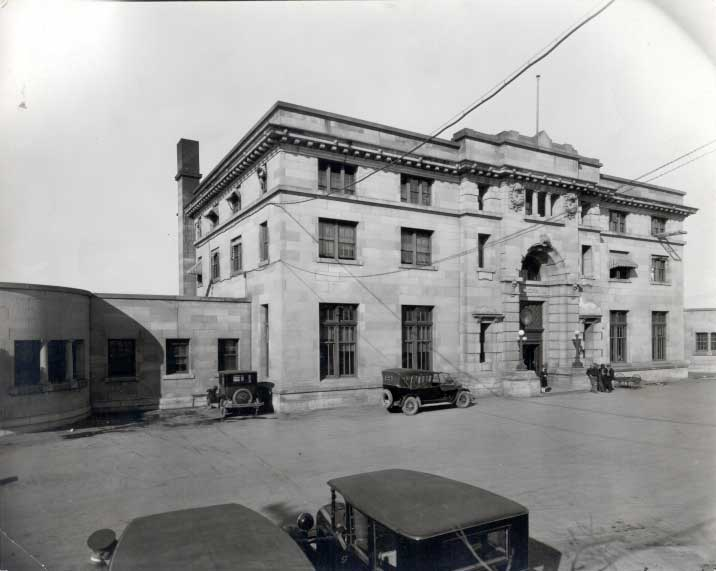
Union Station in 1911

The Beaux-Arts style Union Station was constructed in 1911–12 and was Regina's third train station. The first station was built by the Qu'Appelle, Long Lake and Saskatchewan Railroad and Steamboat Company and was leased to the CPR in 1889. In 1897, the CPR replaced it with a new brick and stone station. That station was dismantled in 1911 and moved to Broadview, where it became Broadview station. After the old CPR station was moved, construction began on the new union station.

The station was completed the same year the deadly Regina Cyclone struck the city, tearing through Wascana Park and gutting part of the downtown area. The building underwent a major expansion in 1931, and the original façade was redone in a simpler Art Deco style with Tyndall stone. As well, terrazzo floors, marble support columns and plaster moulded ceilings were added to the interior.

In 1990, cutbacks to Via Rail throughout Canada lead to the closure of Regina's Union Station. The station had been an important part of Regina's history and heritage since its opening in 1912. After the station's closure, its fate remained unknown for several years. Union Station was designated as an official heritage site in November 1991.

By 1995, a $37 million construction project began to convert the vacant station into the province's second casino. In 1996, Casino Regina opened.

== Description ==
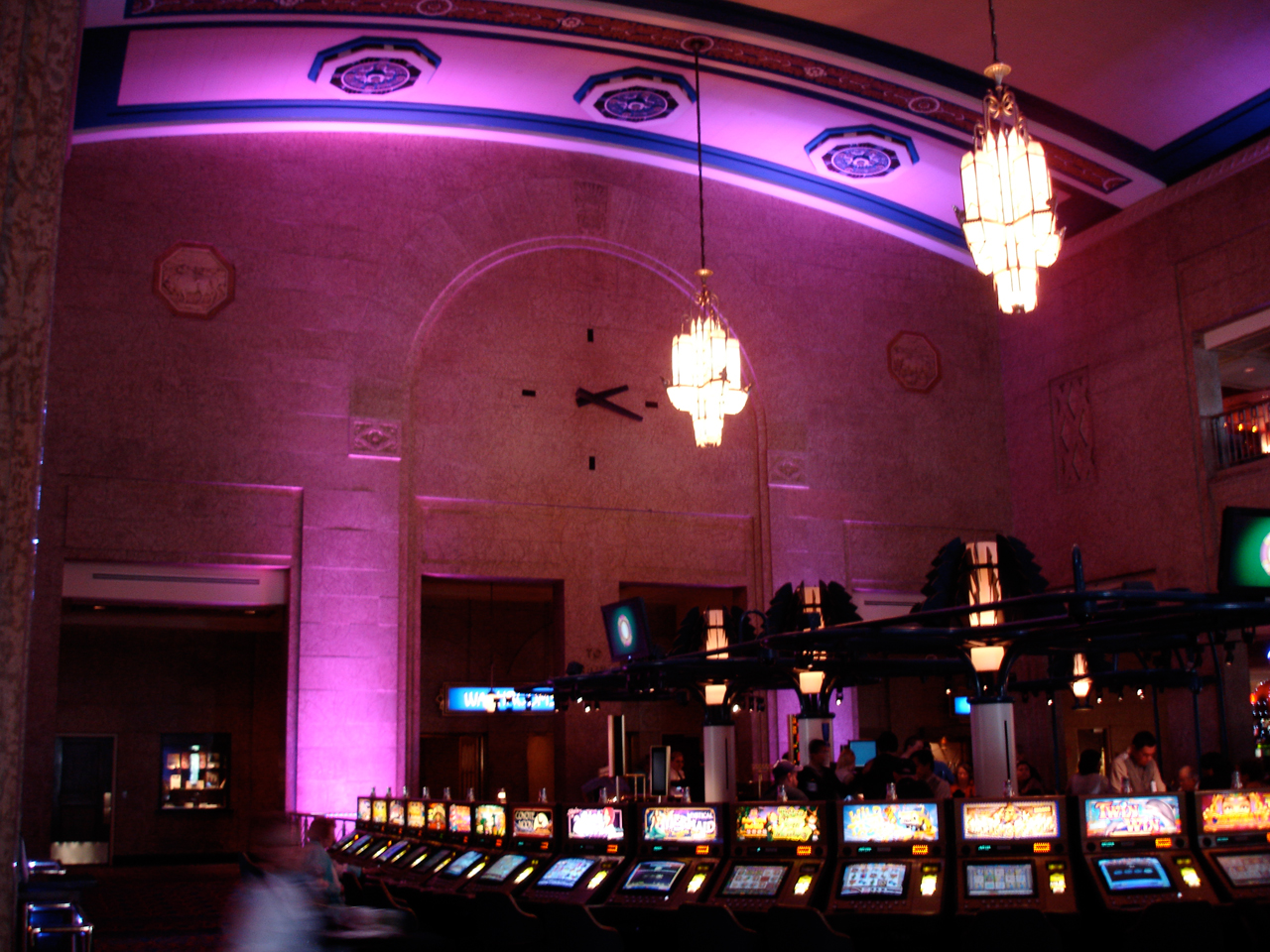
Grand concourse inside the main doors

The building contains old railway police jail cells in the basement that were used for transporting prisoners, and shows evidence of a tunnel representing a system of underground passages said to stretch several blocks east of the casino and south all the way to the stately Hotel Saskatchewan. These tunnels were destroyed during the construction of the Cornwall Centre, a major downtown shopping complex.

Inside, positioned on a wall in the central hall, is a schedule board displaying the arrivals and departures on the day the train station closed in 1990. The hall itself, formerly the station's main concourse, features a high ceiling with simple chandeliers and a clock near the top of the back wall.

The casino houses some 800 slot machines, 35 table games, and an 8-table poker room. The 800-seat Show Lounge features entertainers, and meals are served in The Union Station and Rail Car restaurants, as well as in the CPR Lounge and VIP Lounge. Regularly scheduled Union Station historic tours are another attraction, as are the nightly LED shows.

Casino Regina is a notable employer in the city, employing 664 people, over fifty percent of whom are Aboriginal.

== See also ==
- List of casinos in Canada

Preceding station	Via Rail	Following station
Moose Jaw toward Vancouver	The Canadian before 1990	Brandon North toward Toronto
Preceding station	Canadian National Railway	Following station
Greendyke toward Edmonton	Edmonton – Winnipeg via North Battleford and Regina	Dreghorn toward Winnipeg
Terminus	Regina – Hudson Bay Junction	Victoria Plains toward Hudson Bay Junction
Terminus	Regina – Weyburn	Rowatt toward Weyburn
North Regina toward Neidpath	Neidpath – Regina	Terminus
Preceding station	Canadian Pacific Railway	Following station
Grand Coulee toward Vancouver	Main Line	Pilot Butte toward Montreal Windsor
Terminus	Regina – Winnipeg via Glenboro	Richardson toward Winnipeg
Terminus	Regina – Weyburn	Richardson toward Weyburn
Albatross toward Prince Albert	Prince Albert – Regina	Terminus
Albatross toward Colonsay	Colonsay – Regina	Terminus
