= Little Pine 116 =

Indian reserve in Saskatchewan, Canada

Coordinates: 52°41′40″N 108°27′18″W

- Indian reserve
- Little Pine Indian Reserve No. 116
- Location in Saskatchewan
- First Nation: Little Pine
- Countrie: Canada
- Province: Saskatchewan

Area
  - Total: 25,200.2 ha (62,271 acres)

Population (2016)
  - Total: 700
  - Density: 2.8/km^{2} (7.2/sq mi)
- Community Well-Being Index: 50

Little Pine 116 is an Indian reserve of the Little Pine First Nation in Saskatchewan. It is about 53 kilometres (33 mi) north-west of North Battleford. In the 2016 Canadian Census, it recorded a population of 700 living in 201 of its 220 total private dwellings. In the same year, its Community Well-Being index was calculated at 50 of 100, compared to 58.4 for the average First Nations community and 77.5 for the average non-Indigenous community.

== See also ==
- List of Indian reserves in Saskatchewan
