= Little Pine First Nation =

First nation in Saskatchewan, Canada

- Band No. 340
- People: Plains Cree
- Treaty: Treaty 6
- Headquarters: Paynton
- Province: Saskatchewan

Land
- Main reserve: Little Pine 116
- Reserves: Min-a-he-quo-sis 116A; Min-a-he-quo-sis 116C
- Land area: 259.649 km^{2} (100.251 sq mi)

Population (2019)
- On reserve: 972
- On other land: 0
- Off reserve: 1202
- Total population: 2174

Government
- Chief: Donald (Donny) Ironchild

Tribal Council
- Battlefords Tribal Council

Website
- littlepine.ca

The Little Pine First Nation (Cree: ᒥᓇᐦᐃᑯᓯᕽ minahikosihk) is a Plains Cree First Nations band government in Saskatchewan, Canada. Their reserves include:

- Little Pine 116
- Min-a-he-quo-sis 116A
- Min-a-he-quo-sis 116C

Little Pine First Nation (LPFN) is located at the foot of Bluehill and rests along the shores of the Battle River. According to the Little Pine Official Page, "Bluehill is a symbol of home for our people"

== Demographics ==
As of 2020, the total population of the Little Pine Reserve(s) is 2,175 people. Of those 2,175, there are 973 people on reserve and 1,202 people off reserve.

As of March 2022, the total registered population has increased to 2,200 people, with 979 registered people on the Little Pine reserve itself, 88 people registered on other reserves, and 1,133 people registered off reserve.

The total amount of reserves, settlements and villages consists of 64,161 acres of land.

According to 2016 Census data, the majority of the population in the Little Pine Reserve speak indigenous languages, with 52.1% of the population stating that they have knowledge of an indigenous language. As for education the majority of individuals 15 or over have no degree, certificate, or diploma or have had a trade/apprenticeship or any non-university certificate. In the same year, the Census reported its Community Well-Being index as at 50 of 100, compared to 58.4 for the average First Nations community and 77.5 for the average non-Indigenous community. For income, the average total income calculated for individuals in the reserve is $18,302. The labor force participation rate is 39.1%, and the unemployment rate is 33.3%. Most of the work is being done in the manufacturing, health, and education fields. When it comes to housing and dwelling characteristics, the majority of households are one, two, or non-family private households. The median household income is $28,608. According to the Census, there are 220 total private dwellings in the Little Pine 116 reserve alone.

== History ==
=== Background ===
The year of the Cypress Hills Massacre in 1873, the most famous and influential of the Plains Chiefs Mistahimaskwa, also known as "Big Bear" (c.1825-1888), had the idea to unite all the Cree bands. He was half Ojibwa, half Cree, and led the largest band of Cree that lived on the Plains at that particular time, which was about 2,000 people. He advocated for pan-Amerindianism, which urged all these native bands in the region to unite against white settlement.

In addition, Big Bear stated did not like the terms of Treaty 6, especially the provision stating that Canadian law would become the law of the land. He thought that the treaty would force his people to give up their autonomy. Despite his objections, he was eventually forced to sign the treaty in 1882 in Fort Walsh in order to get rations for his people. By then, only having 247 followers, he moved his band to a remote reserve at Fort Pitt in the north.

Big Bear's effort to unite Amerindians alarmed Ottawa officials, so they urgently sought to find other chiefs to sign treaty. Minahikosis, or "Little Pine", was the half-Blackfoot, half-Cree brother-in-law of Piapot. He had a reputation similar to that of Big Bear. Little Pine held out for three years in hopes of seeing the formation of a unified Amerindian state, but eventually he negotiated and signed the treaty, because his people were starving.

In contrast to Big Bear, Cree chief Pitikwahanapiwiyin, also known as "Poundmaker", the leading Blackfoot chief, got along very well with the white settlers. He also became one of those who signed Treaty 6 in 1876. In 1879 Poundmaker accepted a reserve located about forty miles west of Battleford.

At this point, all the First Nations who resided in the Treaty 6 area had signed treaty, much to Big Bear's dismay. In the final count, those who signed Treaty 6 ended up faring better than those who signed Treaty 4. Under Treaty 6, the bands were accorded concessions such as the "medicine chest" clause and also the promise of relief in the event of famine or pestilence. But the price they paid was great, due to the fact that with the signing of the treaty, they lost control over about 315,000 square miles of land. One of the groups that had to move as a result of the treaty was the Little Pine First Nation.

=== Settlement and foundation ===
Cree Chief Minahikosis (c. 1830-1885), also known as Little Pine, signed an adhesion to Treaty 6

Little Pine First Nation: Location

and he and his people moved from the Cypress Hills region to the foot of Bluehill along the Battle River.

From 1883-1884, Little Pine and Lucky Man camped near Poundmaker's reserve. Although Big Bear, Little Pine, Lucky Man, and Poundmaker all wished for adjoining reserves, they were refused.

=== Early disputes ===
When it came to helping these relocated bands accustom to their new ways of life in the reservations, the government's aid was abysmal. When buffalo began to migrate over in 1877 and the Amerindians wanted to hunt them, their requests for that needed equipment were deliberately ignored by the government. This competition over the buffalo sparked old hostilities as the Blackfoot, Plains Cree, and Sioux consulted over measures to regulate the hunt. In 1880, Big Bear and Little Pine headed south to the remaining buffalo range on the Milk and Missouri rivers, where they met with Riel. The Metis leader was instrumental in persuading the Montana Amerindians---these included the southern Assiniboine, the Blackfeet, the Crow, and the Gros Ventre---to allow the Northerners to hunt on their reservations. This alliance was eventually broken when the Canadian Natives stole horses from American Indians. After all, they were traditional enemies. After this horse-stealing, the U.S. government set out military expeditions to confiscate the horses and equipment from the Canadian Natives and began to restrict border crossings from that point on.

Following these events and after the outbreak of the North-West Rebellion, Poundmaker's and Little Pine's people left their reserves and headed for Battleford, which was a distribution point for supplies. Assiniboine fighters killed two settlers, and others fled into the fort in fright. During the last two days of March, Cree fighters plundered the abandoned settler houses and stores.

Chief Little Pine died shortly after that outbreak. His people were scattered among various bands. As a part of government's policy to keep all Indians on their respective reserves, a reserve was surveyed for those who remained of the Little Pine and Lucky Man bands in 1887. The allotted acres that they received through survey did not correspond to what was entitled to them through treaty.

The Little Pine First Nation spent a century of injustice in these allotted acres. By May 29, 1997, the band had purchased land and begaun to participate in several economic endeavors. The Little Pine First Nation continues to define its right to self-government through its Government Act, which allows for basic structure within the band and offers provisions for the Lands and Resources Management Act and the Election Act. (Christian Thompson, University of Saskatchewan)

=== Developments and projects today ===
Developmental projects include the Little Pine First Nation Racetrack, the Little Pine First Nation Cattle Venture, and a gas and convenience store. The band’s facilities include the Little Pine Health Clinic and Medical Taxis, the Elders’ Hall, the Chief Little Pine School, a band office, the Royal Canadian Mounted Police detachment (two constables working and residing on the reserve), and the Little Pine Daycare.

== Governance ==
Elected in November 2025, the current Chief of the Little Pine First Nation is Dayton Bull. The governing body or the councilors, consists of Russell Bearsears, Kirsten Kahmahkotayo, Michael Achakus, Curtis Bear, and Myron Checkosis. The membership authority is the Section 11 Band, and the Election System is a custom electoral system.

This electoral system used to select a Chief and councillors can be done either under the Indian Act election system, the First Nations Elections Act, a custom system, or under the provisions of a self governing agreement. In this case, the Chief and councillors serve four year terms, from 2021 to 2025. Precisely, they were elected on November 27, 2021 and their expiry date is November 26, 2025.

== Education ==
=== Chief Little Pine School ===
Chief Little Pine School is a K-12 school located in the village of Paynton, SK. Besides education, it offers additional services such as pre-kindergarten care, counseling services, and even Mathletics. According to its official website, its mission is to drive students to "embrace their culture and traditional values as they grow into young men and women."

=== Treaty Six Education Council ===
Little Pine is also involved with the Treaty Six Education Council, an organization that provides second-level education services to its partner Nations. The organization has a centrally located office in North Battleford, Saskatchewan, which is the heart of the Treaty 6 territory. It serves eleven First Nations communities and over 3000 students at the moment.

The Chief of Each Nation that is a member of the council serves as the director for the organization and sets the governing rules for the TSEC. In addition, each member nation appoints a Trustee, through Band Council Resolution, to represent their community on the board. For Little Pine, that Trustee is Adele Bear.

== See also ==
- First Nations in Saskatchewan
- Division No. 13, Saskatchewan
