= Sask Gaming =

Crown corporation owned by the Government of Saskatchewan

Saskatchewan Gaming Corporation
- Trade name: Sask Gaming
- Type: Crown Corporation
- Industry: Gambling
- Founded: 1996
- Headquarters: Regina, Saskatchewan, Canada
- Products: Casino operator
- Website: www.casinoregina.com

Saskatchewan Gaming Corporation, trading as Sask Gaming, is a Crown corporation owned by the Government of Saskatchewan established in 1996. It operates Casino Regina and Casino Moose Jaw. The corporation is a wholly owned subsidiary of Lotteries and Gaming Saskatchewan (LGS).

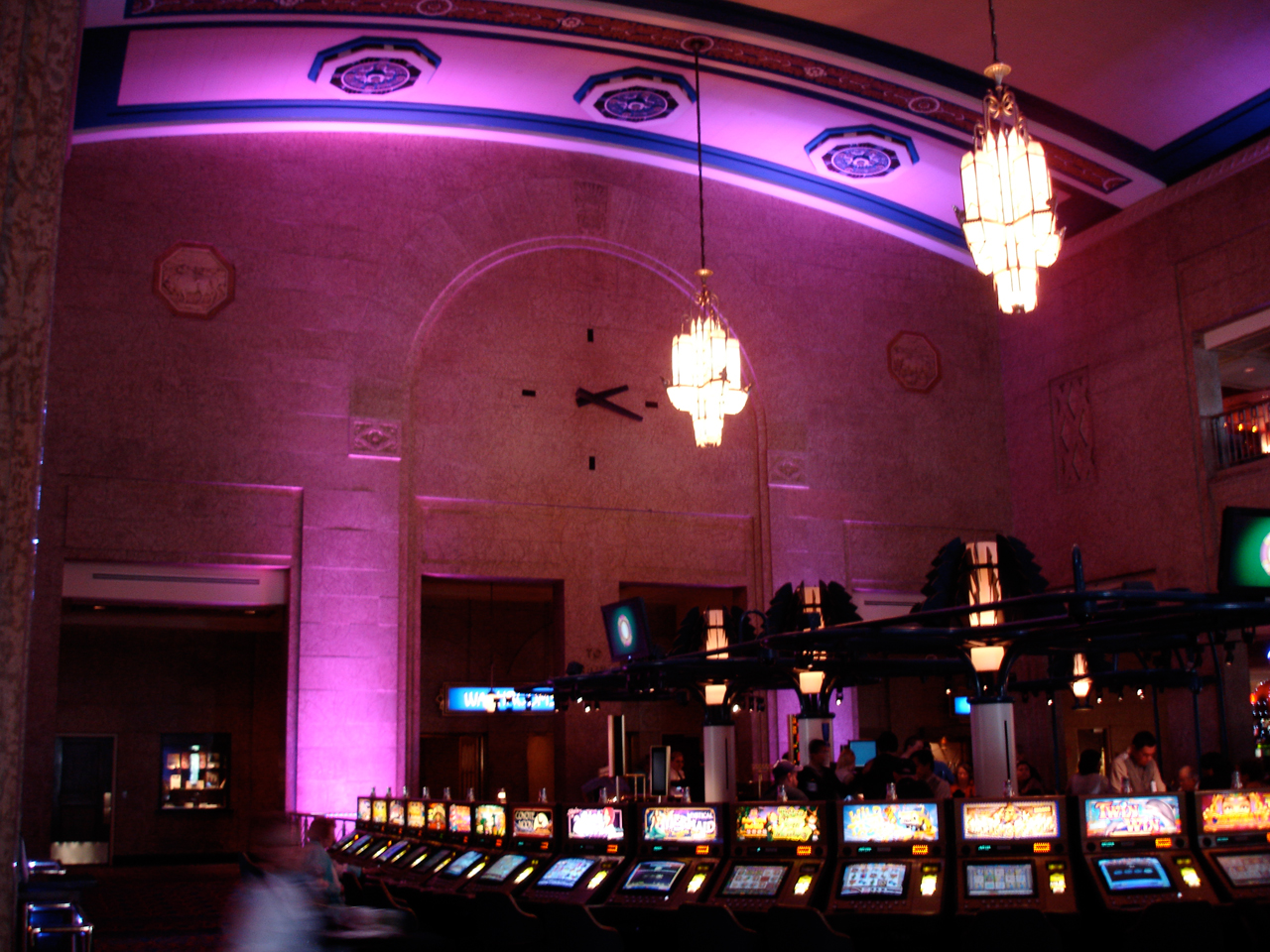
Grand concourse inside Casino Regina

In October 2008, the Saskatchewan Gaming Corporation was named one of "Canada's Top 100 Employers".

In October 2022, it was announced that Sask Gaming would be transferred to the new Lotteries and Gaming Saskatchewan (LGS) crown corporation in April 2023.
