= Better Dwelling =

Vancouver-based financial media company

- Type: Daily
- Format: Online
- Owner(s): Better Dwelling Inc.
- Founder(s): Stephen Punwasi (co-founder)
- Publisher: Better Dwelling Inc.
- Staff writers: Stephen Punwasi; Daniel Wong; Kaitlin Last; Daniel Tencer; Daniel Foch; Tiffany Greene; Joey Evans
- Founded: 2017
- Political alignment: Non-partisan
- Language: English
- Headquarters: Vancouver, Canada
- City: Vancouver
- Country: Canada
- ISSN: 2371-8528
- Website: https://betterdwelling.com

Better Dwelling is a Vancouver-based daily news publisher and financial media company. It operates Canada's largest independent housing news outlet.

== History ==
Better Dwelling was founded in 2017 as a real estate news service that used artificial intelligence to assist with its data journalism. It was co-founded by Stephen Punwasi, whose background is in cognitive computing and machine learning.

In 2017, the company began a daily news syndication service carried by mainstream news publishers such as Business Insider, HuffPost, and Maclean's.

Better Dwelling has reported on the Canadian property bubble and housing crisis. The organization and its staff have collaborated on research with Canada's national housing agency and Transparency International Canada.

In 2021, Better Dwelling was collateral damage in a controversy surrounding Big Tech's censorship of criticism of China and Optimum Publishing International. The outlet had published what was described by Canadian newspaper National Post as an "innocuous" clip of an interview with Optimum author and Global News reporter Sam Cooper, discussing his coverage of the Cullen Commission. Shortly after publishing the video clip, the outlet's staff was removed from managing its Facebook page. The page was later restored with Facebook stating it was an error.

== Research ==
=== Money laundering and property ===
The outlet has played a key role in exposing money laundering in Canadian real estate. Notable contributions involve publishing a leaked Canadian intelligence report that alleges transnational criminals have used housing Vancouver, Canada for laundering since the 1990s and an analysis with Transparency International on billions in opaque ownership in Toronto.

In 2019, the CEO was thanked for their contribution to a report on money laundering and real estate, created at the request of the Government of British Columbia and produced by former RCMP Commissioner Peter German. The report was central to launching the Cullen Commission, B.C.'s anti-money laundering inquiry.

The organization's staff testified how money laundering impacts real estate prices at the Cullen Commission, BC's Inquiry Into Money Laundering.
