= Chinese government interference in the 2019 and 2021 Canadian federal elections =

Foreign interference in Canadian federal elections

The Centre Block on Parliament Hill

The People's Republic of China (PRC) made attempts to interfere in the 2019 Canadian federal election and 2021 Canadian federal election and threatened Canadian politicians, according to Canadian Security Intelligence Service (CSIS) and the Parliament of Canada's Foreign Interference Commission. In late 2022, the Global News television network reported on a suspected attempt by the PRC to infiltrate the Parliament of Canada by funding a network of candidates to run in the 2019 Canadian federal election. In early 2023, The Globe and Mail newspaper published a series of articles reporting that the CSIS, in several classified documents, advised that China's Ministry of State Security (MSS) and United Front Work Department had employed disinformation campaigns and undisclosed donations to support preferred candidates during the 2021 Canadian federal election, with the aim of ensuring that the Liberals would win again, but only with a minority. In February 2023, CSIS concluded that the Chinese government interfered in the 2019 and 2021 elections. In May 2024, an official probe by parliament's Foreign Interference Commission found that China interfered in both elections.

Canadian opposition political parties demanded a public inquiry into what it called failures by the Canadian government of Justin Trudeau to warn parliamentarians of China's activities, notify parliamentarians whom China had targeted, and further protect Canadian democratic procedures. In May 2023, the Canadian government expelled Chinese diplomat Zhao Wei, accused of intimidating a Canadian politician. Rejecting a full public inquiry, Trudeau nominated former Governor General of Canada David Johnston to investigate the allegations. Johnston filed an interim report in May 2023. In his report, he described China's interference as a danger to Canadian democracy, stated that some of the media reports were partially incorrect, and that the Canadian intelligence services and Canadian government needed to make several improvements to counter the threat and protect members of Parliament. While several opposition political parties had called for a full-scale judicial inquiry into the allegations, Johnston recommended against this, stating that the intelligence information is considered "top secret" and could not be discussed in a fully-open inquiry. Johnston intended to continue his inquiry with public hearings and a final report in October 2023, but instead resigned as the special rapporteur on June 9.

Following Johnston's resignation, Trudeau tasked Intergovernmental Affairs minister Dominic LeBlanc with negotiating with opposition parties to discuss the possibility of a public inquiry on the issue. In September 2023, Justin Trudeau commissioned Québec justice Marie-Josée Hogue to preside over the Public Inquiry into Foreign Interference in Federal Electoral Processes and Democratic Institutions. Her mandate includes investigating foreign interference from China, but also from other states deemed hostile to Canada, such as Russia. In May 2024, the inquiry issued its preliminary report, finding that China engaged in foreign interference in both elections, but the interference did not affect the ultimate result of either election. The final report, issued in January 2025, identified disinformation spread on social media as a major threat to Canadian democracy.

== Background ==
According to former Canadian and U.S. intelligence officials, Chinese overseas operations in Canada have risen to the extent that they represent an alarming security threat to the United States, which has conducted a secret probe of the issue. These operations were said to consist of espionage, compromise of politicians and government officials, election interference, and control of individuals and companies with ties to China, such as via foreign police stations.

By the time of the 2021 election, the Conservative Party had adopted a tough stance on China, which included a proposed withdrawal from the Beijing-led Asian Infrastructure Investment Bank, a reduction in dependence on Chinese imports, and a ban on the use of Huawei network equipment. The Chinese government described the stance as "smearing China" and threatened that it would "invite counterstrikes".

== Advance warnings by intelligence officials ==
In June 2017, the Canadian National Security Advisor drafted a Memorandum for the Prime Minister, advising Prime Minister Justin Trudeau that PRC agents were "assisting Canadian candidates running for political offices". This document, which was copied to the Clerk of the Privy Council, went on to say that officials had documented evidence of China attempting to infiltrate "all levels of government" and alleged that, "[t]here is a substantial body of evidence that Chinese officials are actively pursuing a strategy of engagement to influence Canadian officials in ways that can compromise the security of Canada and the integrity of Canadian institutions".

Trudeau received a classified report from the National Security and Intelligence Committee of Parliamentarians (NSICOP) in August 2019. It warned that public officials across all levels of government were being targeted and the government had been "slow to react to the threat of foreign interference" and "must do better". A redacted copy of the report was subsequently released in March 2020.

Security officials reportedly gave an "urgent, classified briefing" to Liberal Party officials three weeks before the federal election in 2019, "warning them that one of their candidates was part of a Chinese foreign interference network"—referring to Han Dong—but it was ignored by the Liberal Party.

== Interference during the 2019 election ==
The plot to infiltrate the 2019 election was made public through an investigative report by Global News, on November 7, 2022.

Unconfirmed, anonymous sources for the report stated that gathered intelligence suggested that a Chinese Communist Party (CCP) proxy group mobilized around CA$250,000 to fund the infiltration network through a staffer for an election candidate and a member of the Legislative Assembly of Ontario, who both acted as intermediaries. Recipients of the donations allegedly included at least 11 candidates and members of their campaign staff, 13 or more federal aides, an Ontario MPP, and unelected public officials according to a January 2022 Privy Council Office (PCO) "Special Report". The PCO "Special Report" was prepared from information derived from 100 Canadian Security Intelligence Service (CSIS) documents. The sources also said that the candidates were members of Canada's two main political parties (the Liberal Party of Canada and Conservative Party of Canada), and that some of them were “witting affiliates of the Chinese Communist Party.”

On February 24, 2023, Global News reported that its intelligence sources with knowledge of CSIS affairs reported that Dong was an alleged "witting affiliate" in China's election interference networks. Sources state that Prime Minister Justin Trudeau and senior Liberal party officials ignored CSIS warnings about Dong, which has been denied by Trudeau.

The same article also stated that a "Liberal insider" and former Ontario MPP Michael Chan had possibly arranged Geng Tan's ouster in Don Valley North in favour of Dong in advance of the 2019 federal election because the CCP was unhappy with Tan. Chan, Dong, and the Chinese embassy denied the accusations, with Dong describing the leaks as "seriously inaccurate". Dong and the Liberal Party also said that his 2019 nomination victory had followed all of the party's rules. According to an anonymous intelligence official and intelligence documents viewed by Global News, CSIS had also been investigating Dong due to an alleged meeting between Dong and a senior official from the CCP's United Front Work Department in New York state.

Dong has denied the allegations made against him, saying his 2019 nomination was "open and followed the rules" and that he was not a witting affiliate. In March 2023, he said that he was yet to be contacted by the RCMP, Elections Canada, or CSIS concerning the allegations, and that he wanted the truth to come out.

In March 2023, Global News reported that Vincent Ke was the Ontario MPP alleged to have served as a financial intermediary for the Chinese consulate as part of election interference efforts. On the same day, Ke denied the allegations and resigned from his role as parliamentary secretary and from the Progressive Conservative Party of Ontario caucus, to sit as an independent. The office of the Premier of Ontario had received a CSIS briefing about Ke in November 2022. In April 2023, Ke said that he had served Global News with a libel notice concerning their reporting about him.

== Interference during the 2021 election ==
One year following the 2021 Canadian federal election, Conservative Party politicians, including former leader Erin O'Toole, blamed Chinese government interference as a contributing factor to the Party's loss. In a 2022 interview on the UnCommons podcast with Nathaniel Erskine-Smith, O'Toole opined that PRC media outlets could have cost the Conservatives up to "eight or nine seats". The Conservative Party believes that their candidates were targeted by foreign interference in 13 federal ridings. The Conservative party was regularly briefed by CSIS on foreign interference during the 2021 election campaign. The party believes that foreign influence included foreign government-paid campaign workers, illegal advertising, and manipulation and misinformation on social media, including WeChat and Weibo.

O'Toole's beliefs were supported by Conservative MP and foreign affairs critic Michael Chong, who stated that while the party was initially hesitant to blame China for influencing the vote due to inconclusive evidence at the time, he now believed, "The communist leadership in Beijing did interfere in the last federal election by spreading disinformation through proxies on Chinese-language social media platforms that contributed to the defeat of a number of Conservative MPs", citing a report by McGill University. Similar views were shared by O'Toole's director of parliamentary affairs Mitch Heimpel, who said that Canadian national security officers had contacted the Conservatives around election day to express concerns about potential foreign interference. Heimpel also cited the example of former Conservative MP Kenny Chiu who had been targeted by a disinformation campaign on the Chinese social media platform WeChat. Research into electoral interference by McGill University indicated that there was no specific data to draw a full conclusion on the impact of potential interference and noted, "Canadian-Chinese issues were not central to the campaign, nor were they top of mind for voters" but concurred that researchers had found Chinese state media had worked "with an apparent aim to convince Canadians of Chinese origin to vote against the Conservative Party".

In February 2023, The Globe and Mail published a series of articles, reporting that CSIS, in several classified documents, advised that China had employed disinformation campaigns and undisclosed donations to support preferred candidates, all with the aim of ensuring that the Liberals would win again, but only with a minority. Other illegal tactics under the Canada Elections Act were also alleged, such as directing international students to work for preferred candidates (ostensibly as volunteers, but being paid by sympathetic business owners), and arranging for sympathetic donors to contribute to such campaigns, with the difference between their payments and the resulting tax credits being returned to them. The Procedure and House Affairs Committee of the House of Commons met to discuss these reports, and voted to expand their current inquiry into the 2019 election to include the 2021 election as well.

Global News reported allegations that, in February 2021, Dong told the Chinese Consul General in Toronto not to release Michael Spavor and Michael Kovrig because doing so would politically benefit the Conservatives. Subsequently, Justin Trudeau announced that Kovrig and Spavor had been released from detention four days after the 2021 election. Upon voluntarily stepping down from the Liberal caucus, Dong confirmed that he spoke to the Consul General, but denied that he advised against releasing Spavor or Kovrig. The Globe and Mail reported that a few weeks earlier, the PMO had reviewed a transcript of the conversation but concluded that it was not “actionable evidence”. Following the allegations, Dong said he had retained a lawyer and intended to sue Global News for defamation. Global News stood by its reporting, with its editor-in-chief saying Global follows "a rigorous set of journalistic principles and practices". In April, Dong filed a defamation lawsuit against Global News and some of its reporters. In April 2024, Dong testified in a federal inquiry that international students from China were bused in to vote for him in a Liberal Party election. The same month, a report by Global Affairs Canada stated that Kenny Chiu was targeted by social media accounts controlled by the China News Service.

== Parties involved ==
=== Chinese Consulate in Toronto ===
According to the Global News report, the consulate directed the transfer of funds during the 2019 election. The report also said that a member in the consulate directed a staffer for unnamed federal election candidates to monitor and interfere with their engagement activities. The interference efforts included preventing meetings with representatives of Taiwan.

=== Chinese Consulate in Vancouver ===
According to classified CSIS reports reviewed by the Globe and Mail, China's former consul-general in Vancouver, Tong Xiaoling, boasted in 2021 about how she helped defeat two Conservative MPs. After this was reported in the press, senior officials at Global Affairs of Canada reached out to Tong. A January 10, 2022, CSIS report viewed by The Globe and Mail outlined how the consulate and Tong also interfered in the 2022 Vancouver municipal election to replace the mayor and elect pro-Beijing councillors. Previous Vancouver mayor Kennedy Stewart, who was critical of the Chinese government, would like to see Ottawa expand its inquiry into Beijing's interference in the 2019 and 2021 federal elections to municipal and provincial politics as well. Current Vancouver mayor Ken Sim denounced the accusations of interference as racially motivated.

=== United Front Work Department ===
According to the Global News report, several candidates in the 2019 election infiltration network met with officials from the CCP's United Front Work Department. CSIS's documents said the organizations activities in Canada have facilitated interference operations by the Ministry of State Security, China's principal civilian intelligence agency, and that its members in Canada had operated from Chinese consulates in Canada.

== Immediate aftermath ==
Four months after the 2019 election, details of the Chinese infiltration network were described in a PCO report entitled "PRC Foreign Interference: 2019 Elections". The PCO report was presented to senior Liberal Party officials, and described how the Chinese Consulate in Toronto used an extensive network of community groups to conceal the flow of funds between Chinese officials and network members. "This network involves the Chinese consulate, local community leaders, Canadian politicians, and their staff," the 2020 PCO report said. "Under broad guidance from the consulate, co-opted staff of targeted politicians provide advice on China-related issues, and community leaders facilitate the clandestine transfer of funds and recruit potential targets".

In December 2021, a report by CSIS that was later reviewed by Global News described Chinese consulate officials as believing that "it is easy to influence Chinese immigrants to agree with PRC's stance". The report also said that "[t]he Liberal Party of Canada is becoming the only party that the People's Republic of China can support". The report was distributed to the CIA and FBI, as well as Australian, New Zealand, and British intelligence services.

Following news reports in November 2022, CSIS said they had identified PRC foreign interference in Canada, which they defined to include election interference through covert foreign political financing. Trudeau said that although China has been "continuing to play aggressive games with our institutions, with our democracies", his government has been undertaking measures to combat "foreign interference of our democracy and institutions". On November 9, a request was made by a bipartisan group of Canadian MPs to convene an emergency meeting in order to discuss the interference allegations detailed in the Global News report. Prime Minister Justin Trudeau stated in 2021 regarding the plot, "I do not have any information, nor have I been briefed on any federal candidates receiving any money from China".

In the fall of 2022, the Chinese government applied for a visa for a new position at its embassy in Ottawa. Following a review of the application by Global Affairs Canada, the department concluded that the position was "transparently not a diplomatic position", likely meant instead for a political operative. A diplomatic visa was denied.

In response to further reports in February 2023, Justin Trudeau said that he "never got briefings on candidates receiving money from China". However, anonymous, unconfirmed sources who spoke to Global News described years of "interactive" dialogue between senior intelligence officials and Trudeau's office regarding China's incursions into Canadian elections. These same officials stated that the prime minister's office has been reticent to adopt legal reforms already undertaken by Canada's allies, and one of the officials described this inaction as "inexcusable". According to an anonymous CSIS official, "the floodgates have been opened in the last five years. There has been ample evidence placed in front of the Liberal Party of Canada, and they have done essentially nothing".

Faced with questions from reporters on March 8, 2023, Trudeau said, "I know that no matter what I say, Canadians continue to have questions about what [the government] did and what we didn't".

The Coordinator for Strategic Communications for the US National Security Council, John Kirby, said later in March that intelligence leaks and allegations of election interference had not damaged Canada's relationship with other Five Eyes partners, and that the investigations and Parliamentary reviews underway were the correct way to proceed.

=== Effect of interference on Conservative Party stance towards China ===
Beijing critics had expressed concern that the Conservative Party had softened its stance on China since Erin O'Toole's defeat in the 2021 election. According to Michel Juneau-Katsuya, a former head of CSIS's Asia-Pacific desk, moderation in the Conservative stance indicates that "the Chinese have successfully scared and bullied the Conservatives". Pierre Poilievre's office denied that the party had changed its position after the last election, but Mehmet Tohti, head of the Uyghur Rights Advocacy Project, noted that the Conservative Party stopped raising the issue of Uyghur genocide in China in Question Period immediately after the 2021 election, a dramatic change which "shows the interference is working".

Concerns about the Conservatives' softening China stance were raised when Poilievre sat next to two individuals with known ties to the CCP at a January 2023 luncheon – individuals noted for criticizing Canada's public condemnation of human rights abuses in China, supporting Chinese unification, and blaming Canada for instigating the diplomatic feud that resulted in the imprisonment of Michael Spavor and Michael Kovrig. One of these individuals at the luncheon had reportedly urged O'Toole to resign after the 2021 election, citing the Conservative platform's central focus on challenging the Chinese government and its policies.

== Investigations ==
In the aftermath of the reporting, various investigations have begun, including by the National Security and Intelligence Review Agency (NSIRA), by NSICOP, and parliamentary investigations.

=== Committee on Procedure and House Affairs ===
On March 7, 2023, Liberal MPs filibustered an opposition motion in the Canadian House of Commons Standing Committee on Procedure and House Affairs (PROC) which sought to require the Prime Minister's chief of staff, Katie Telford, to testify concerning election interference and intelligence briefings. When the committee was to resume in the afternoon, Liberal committee members did not attend, denying the committee the quorum needed to resume.

Liberal members of the PROC continued a filibuster the following week, where they read newspaper articles into the record, talked about personal overseas travel and their university days, in order to prevent a vote on a motion to subpoena Telford. Conservative MP Michael Cooper asked the committee to vote on the motion, saying that the filibuster had already continued for "more than 14 hours, over four days". The committee meeting was suspended after 10:00 pm without the motion coming to a vote.

On March 20, Conservative MPs tabled a motion in the House of Commons to compel Telford to testify before the Committee on Access to Information, Privacy and Ethics concerning election interference. The following day, hours before the motion was scheduled to be voted on, it was announced that the government would permit Telford to testify at the PROC. Following the announcement, the Conservative motion was defeated 177 to 145, with Liberal and NDP MPs voting against the motion. A related motion requiring Telford to testify, and inviting Jenni Byrne and others, ultimately passed at the PROC.

Shortly before Telford testified before the committee on April 14, 2023, PCO tabled documents with the committee showing that Trudeau had received at least six briefings on foreign election interference since 2018. Telford refused to answer questions about when Trudeau was briefed about specific documents or information, citing national-security secrecy and saying other informal briefings also occurred. She also cast doubt on some of the reporting, saying some of the claims "don't add up". Two weeks later, former Liberal campaign director Jeremy Broadhurst and former Conservative director Fred DeLorey testified before the committee. Broadhurst testified that CSIS officials had told him something about a Liberal candidate in 2019 and as a result, he briefed Trudeau the next day, but he declined to answer questions about the nature or details of the conversation, citing national security. He said that intelligence officials never would have recommended the party replace a candidate, as doing so would be outside of their role. Broadhurst also declined to answer questions about whether the party had discussed replacing Dong as the candidate for Don Valley North, saying that he could not answer such questions without revealing the contents of intelligence briefings.

=== National Security and Intelligence Committee of Parliamentarians ===
In March 2023, Trudeau instructed NSICOP to investigate foreign interference in Canada, with a special eye on election meddling. During the press conference, Trudeau admitted that his government had not acted on many of the recommendations made in previous reports from NSICOP. In its 2021 review, provided to Trudeau in May 2022, the body had asked the government to respond to the recommendations made in its previous seven reviews. In the March 2023 press conference, Trudeau said that his government would now respond to those recommendations within 30 days.

NSICOP will not have access to cabinet documents, unless the government decides to waive cabinet confidentiality. NSICOP previously wrote to Justin Trudeau in the fall of 2022 requesting the right to access cabinet documents, saying that without access, its ability to provide oversight was limited.

=== Calls for a public inquiry ===
The House of Commons passed a non-binding motion on March 23, calling for a public inquiry into foreign election interference. The motion passed 172 to 149, with Conservative, NDP, Bloc Québécois, and Green MPs voting in favour, and Liberals voting against. Han Dong, sitting as an independent, also voted in favour of the motion.

In May, the House of Commons passed a non-binding motion calling on the government to expel Chinese diplomats involved in interference. The motion also called on the government to establish a public inquiry and a foreign agent registry, and to force the closure of Chinese police stations operating in Canada.

=== Appointment of Special Rapporteur ===
Trudeau announced in March 2023 that he would be appointing a special rapporteur to "make expert recommendations on protecting and enhancing Canadians' faith in our democracy", stating the rapporteur would be named within weeks. A week later, Trudeau committed to naming a special rapporteur "in the coming days or week". Trudeau named former governor general David Johnston as independent special rapporteur the next day, tasking him with helping "protect the integrity of Canada's democracy".

==== Reception ====
The leaders of the Conservative and Bloc parties raised concerns about the appointment, pointing to Johnston's membership in the Trudeau Foundation, his relationship with the Trudeau family, and his performance as the commissioner of the Leaders' Debates Commission. They reacted to news of the appointment by demanding a public inquiry over it, with Bloc leader Yves-François Blanchet saying that his party would not put forth any candidates without one and that "Trudeau appears unwilling to launch an inquiry and he should not use the rapporteur role to keep Parliament and the general public in the dark".

Some Journalists raised similar concerns and added criticism over state visits to China he made as governor general at the direction of Harper in 2013 and of Trudeau in 2017, other perceived connections to China, past efforts to improve Canada–China relations, and his role in framing the investigation of Mulroney, known as the Olipaht Commission. Rick Salutin at the Toronto Star, aspersed Johnston for not defending himself against Poilievre's imputations by raising his past work for Harper in framing the terms of that commission.

While Trudeau said that all parties had been consulted prior to Johnston's appointment, the NDP indicated that Johnston's name was not raised with them during the consultations, though they expressed their support for his appointment. Some journalists praised the choice of Johnston, citing his experience as a legal scholar and dean of law, as well as the trust put in him by the Conservative Harper to act as an impartial referee as governor general during a time of parliamentary instability, and calling Johnston an "inspired choice" and one of the few "figures in Canadian life whose word can[not] be more trusted". While Ibbitson also lamented that the appointment may damage Johnston's reputation,

==== Follow-up ====
Cabinet released the terms of reference on March 21, 2023. Johnston was to reach a decision about whether the government should call a public inquiry by May 23, 2023, and complete the remainder of his review by October 31, 2023.

The government said that Johnston would have access to classified and unclassified documents to perform his review but did not commit to provide him access to all cabinet documents, saying only that he would have access "where necessary".

==== Review ====
During the review, party leaders Justin Trudeau, Jagmeet Singh, and Yves-François Blanchet met with Johnston to discuss interference. Elizabeth May said her party was not consulted by Johnston's office. Pierre Poilievre was contacted in the week prior to the release of the first report but declined to meet with Johnston. While his office answered email requests from Johnston for information, Poilievre said he would not meet with Johnston, calling the rapporteur position a "fake job" and questioned Johnston's impartiality, saying Johnston is "a ski buddy, cottage neighbour, family friend and member of the Beijing-financed Trudeau Foundation". Previous Conservative leader Erin O'Toole was also contacted for a meeting with Johnston in the week prior to release of first report, but discovered at the meeting that the report had already been finalized and sent for French translation.

==== Release of first report ====
Johnston tabled his first report on May 23, 2023. He found that there were "substantial gaps in the communication and processing of intelligence information" but he said that he had not found any evidence of "the Prime Minister or their offices knowingly ignoring intelligence, advice, or recommendations on foreign interference or being driven by partisan considerations". Johnston asked NSICOP and NSIRA to review his findings, but recommended against calling a public inquiry, as he felt doing the opposite would effectively duplicate the work he had just completed, since an inquiry would, in Johnston's opinion, reveal no new information and would have to be held in camera (i.e. not publicly), due to security concerns. Near the end of the report, Johnston directly criticized opposition leader Pierre Poilievre, saying that "[w]hile I recognize that in normal political circumstances an opposition leader may not want to be subject to the constraints of the [Secrets of Information Act], the matter is too important for anyone aspiring to lead the country to intentionally maintain a veil of ignorance on these matters". Johnston also said that allegations reported by Global News that Han Dong had told Chinese officials to extend the detention of Kovrig and Spavor were false. In response, Global News stood by its reporting. Johnston acknowledged during questioning by the Procedure and House Affairs Committee that he did not interview Han Dong as part of his investigation. Following the release of Johnston's report, Trudeau said he would not call a public inquiry and that the government would follow Johnston's other recommendations.

Poilievre criticized the report, calling it an attempted "whitewash" and saying that Johnston was in a conflict of interest. NDP Leader Jagmeet Singh said he disagreed with the findings, urged David Johston to step aside, and called on the government to hold a public inquiry. Bloc Quebecois Leader Yves-Francois Blanchet also rejected Johnston's report, calling its conclusions illegitimate and saying that the Prime Minister should not have chosen a friend as special rapporteur.

Both the Toronto Star and Globe and Mail Editorial boards rejected Johnston's report, calling instead for a full independent public inquiry to reassure Canadians that their elections are "free and fair". Democracy Watch also rejected the report and filed a complaint with the federal ethics commissioner, saying that Johnston's appointment as special rapporteur violated the Conflict of Interest Act. In addition to Johnston's potential conflict of interest, Democracy Watch also flagged a potential conflict of interest with the primary advisor hired to review inquiry materials for his investigation, who is a long-time Liberal Party donor, filing a second complaint with the federal ethics commissioner. Canadian-Chinese dissident, religious, and human rights activist groups targeted by Beijing also rejected Johnston's findings, calling for a full public inquiry. Journalists and pundits, including former NDP leader Tom Mulcair writing for CTV News, widely panned the report, criticizing Johnston's perceived conflict of interest, and lamenting damage that Johnston may have inflicted on his own reputation and legacy. Johnston was, however, defended by at least one columnist, who implored for Johnston to be trusted as special rapporteur, since public inquiries are too expensive and time-consuming.

In response to criticism over Johnston's report, Trudeau dismissed calls for Johnston's resignation, defended Johnston's extraordinary commitment to his country, and accused the opposition of partisan attacks.

==== Resignation ====
On May 30, the NDP introduced a non-binding motion in the House of Commons, calling on Johnston to resign, citing "serious questions [that] have been raised about the special rapporteur process, the counsel [Johnston] retained in support of [the] work, his findings, and his conclusions". Jagmeet Singh said the "appearance of a conflict of interest" undermined Johnston's work. The following day, the House of Commons passed the motion 174 to 150 with all opposition parties in support, and Liberal MPs opposing the motion. Following the vote, Johnston committed to continuing his work saying "I deeply respect the right of the House of Commons to express its opinion about my work going forward, but my mandate comes from the government".

A couple of weeks later, Johnston announced his resignation effective the end of June citing a "highly partisan atmosphere around [his] appointment and work".

=== Public inquiry ===
Following Johnston's resignation, on June 10, Dominic LeBlanc said the government would be consulting with opposition parties on how to proceed including the possibilities of appointing a replacement rapporteur, exploring some other public process, or establishing a formal public inquiry. Over the summer, LeBlanc was in talks with various sitting judges lead a public inquiry. In September, it was announced that Justice Marie-Josée Hogue of the Quebec Court of Appeal would be appointed as commissioner overseeing a public inquiry.

In January and February 2024, two diaspora groups pulled out of the Foreign Interference Commission of Inquiry "due to standing being granted to individuals suspected to have strong ties to the Chinese consulates, and their proxies," principally, Han Dong, Michael Chan, and Yuen Pau Woo. In April 2024, the inquiry saw that CSIS concluded in February 2023 that the Chinese government interfered in the 2019 and 2021 elections.

==== First report ====
The inquiry issued its preliminary report on May 3, 2024, finding that China was the main perpetrator (among several countries) of foreign interference in the elections, and described its operation as "persistent and sophisticated". The inquiry found that the ultimate result of neither election was affected by the interference, but that the results in individual ridings may have been. In addition, China's operations were not focused towards supporting a particular political party, but to undermine individual politicians critical of it and support those that might be more favourable.

Hogue also raised concern about the threshold used by the "Panel of five" - a group of bureaucrats charged with monitoring the elections for interference - before making a public notification of foreign interference. Criticizing its reliance on the notion of the "self-cleansing media ecosystem", the idea that disinformation would fade away quickly due to the fast campaign news cycle. Ultimately, Hogue described the interference "a stain" on the electoral process because it undermined public confidence in democratic institutions, calling it "perhaps the greatest harm Canada has suffered as a result of foreign interference"

== See also ==
- Foreign electoral intervention
- Entryism
- 2019 Australian Parliament infiltration plot
- 1996 United States campaign finance controversy
- Geng Tan
- Trudeau cash-for-access scandal
- Project Sidewinder
- Transnational repression by China
- Countering Foreign Interference Act
