= Canadian property bubble =

Rise in real estate prices since 2002

The Canadian property bubble refers to the significant rise in Canadian real estate prices between 2002 and 2022, with short periods of falling prices in 2008 and 2018. Between 2023 and 2026 prices have plateaued for residency property. At least in 11 urban centres.

== Summary ==
Typical stages of an economic bubble

The Dallas Federal Reserve rated Canadian real estate as "exuberant" beginning in 2003. From 2003 to 2018, Canada saw an increase in home and property prices of up to 337% in some cities. In 2016, the OECD warned that Canada's financial stability was at risk due to elevated housing prices, investment and household debt. By 2018, home-owning costs were above 1990 levels when Canada saw its last housing bubble burst. Bloomberg Economics ranked Canada as the second largest housing bubble across the OECD in 2019 and 2021. Toronto scored the highest in the world in Swiss bank UBS' real estate bubble index in 2022, with Vancouver also scoring among the ten riskiest cities in the world while the IMF warned that Canada faces the highest risk of mortgage defaults among advanced economies. In 2019, Parliament passed the National Housing Strategy Act, which recognizes housing as a human right, but McGill University professor Jayne Malenfant noted a lack of political will as, ultimately, "viewing housing as an investment is incompatible with the right to housing".

Comparison of US 2006 housing bubble vs Canada 2022
Indicator	US	Canada
Annual housing price increase yoy	13.43% 2004–2005	26.6% 2020–2021
Maximum regional price increase yoy	Las Vegas resale homes 52.4% 2003–2004	London townhomes 51.5% 2021–2022
Peak investor activity nation-wide	15.31% non-occupied home purchases	20.58% multiple mortgage holders (does not include mortgages originating outside of Canada)
Peak investor activity regional high	Approximately 30% of Las Vegas sales in 2005	41.9% Ontario condominiums (city breakdown unavailable) 31.5% Nova Scotia for all residential
Real national home price increase, 10 year	86% 1996–2006	107% 2000–2010 (209% 20 year 2002–2022)
Peak housing investment as a percentage of national GDP	7% in 2006	8.9% in 2022
National affordability : house price to income ratio	8.82 March 2006	9.72 February 2022

*Please note that data may not be comparable (e.g. non-occupied homes in US vs multiple mortgage holders in Canada).

== History ==
=== Background factors ===
Canada's last housing busts happened during the early 1990s recession, when Canada was facing low commodity prices, a large national debt and deficit that was weakening the value of the Canadian dollar, the possibility of Quebec independence, and a recession in Canada's main trading partner, the United States.

Between 1986 and 1989, housing costs in Toronto increased by 150%, the highest four-year price escalation to date. This spike corresponded with the introduction of the Canadian Immigrant Investor Program in 1986, a type of "golden visa" that allowed high-wealth individuals and their families a pathway to permanent residency; as well as the plummeting of five-year mortgage rates from over 21% in 1981 to 10.2% in 1987. Two years after 5-year mortgage rates began increasing (from 11.25% eventually to over 14%), average house prices began to decline by over 27% in Greater Toronto (1989 to 1996) during the early 1990s recession. The Canadian Immigrant Investor Program ended in 2014, while the Quebec Investor program continued on until it was frozen in 2019.

Vancouver’s first housing bubble burst in 1981, the second declined gradually in 1994. Otherwise, Canadian housing prices from 1980 to 2001 stayed within a steady and narrow range of 3 to 4 times provincial annual median income, with little effect anywhere outside of these two cities.

The 2000s commodities boom (caused by rising demand from emerging-market economies such as China) boosted economic activity, particularly business investment, which generated job growth in Canada. During this time, significant rural-to-urban migration and immigration to Canada likely contributed to the pressure on house prices. By 2010, Canada began experiencing, for the first time since 1980, a synchronized housing bubble across the six largest residential real estate markets in Canada, which represent approximately 40% of all real estate sales in Canada. In 2012, the IMF warned about Canadian housing market and debt levels in their biannual report.

=== Attempts to slow price growth 2016–2017 ===
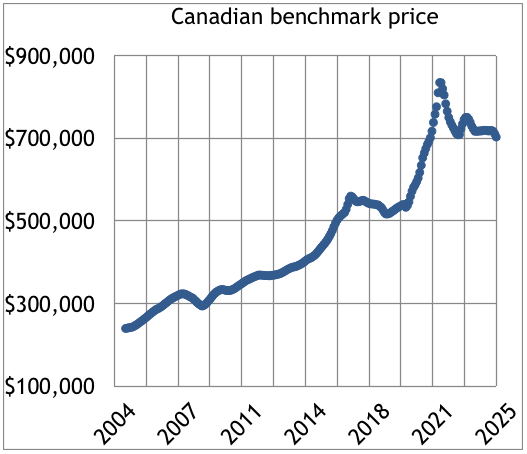
MLS Canadian aggregate data of all regions, composite of all housing types Jan 2005 to Mar 2025

In 2015, the IMF further detailed their concern as house prices being 9-20% overvalued, while the Bank of Canada estimated 10-30% overvaluation. In December 2015, the benchmark price of housing in Metro Vancouver increased by 18.9% year over year. In March 2017, the cost of owning a single-family house in the Greater Toronto Area had grown 33% year over year. In May 2017, the IMF again expressed concern to Canada’s Standing Senate committee on National Finance in an in-person meeting. Specifically related to housing exposure, household debt, and rapid acceleration of home prices. This was shortly before Moody’s downgraded the credit ratings of the Big Six Canadian banks, citing increased private sector debt and elevated house prices. Multiple levels of government attempted to slow the growth of the real estate market and gradually bring down prices, to aid first-time home buyers in a way that would cause the bubble to shrink slowly rather than burst in this period of time. In October 2016, Finance Canada introduced a stress test for insured mortgages, to ensure that buyers would continue to afford their mortgage in the event that interest rates rose. British Columbia instituted a 15% foreign buyer's tax, termed the National resident Speculation tax. In 2017, Ontario followed suit with a 15% property transfer tax on foreign buyers in the Greater Golden Horseshoe region. and the city of Vancouver introduced a vacant property tax. In addition, the province of Ontario's Fair Housing Plan set in place stricter rent controls and 16 measures to help combat the growth of the real estate market . These remedies coincided with a slight dip in housing prices in 2017 which some believed was the beginning of a housing crash; however this did not come to pass.

=== 2018 and 2019 signs of risk ===
Despite prices easing, the Canadian Mortgage and Housing Corporation noted that the housing market remained vulnerable and cited overbuilding (high rental vacancy or inventory of unsold new-builds) as an indicator of the country's housing bubble risk.

Other signs of financial risk included:

1. Canadian private sector debt-to-GDP ratio rising to 218% in 2018
2. The amount of household debt in Canada surpassing national GDP
3. In Alberta, despite a recession and high unemployment, real estate prices in Calgary dropping less than 5%.

The OSFI revised and expanded the mortgage stress test in 2018 to uninsured mortgages, although CREA decried this action in 2020 due to its impact on declining sales.

Investors (defined as owners who borrow to buy a secondary property while maintaining a mortgage for a primary property) accounted for ~20% of home purchases between 2018 and 2019, and increased in 2021. StatsCan's Canadian Housing Statistic Program estimated in a 2019 report that one third of the Toronto condo market is owned by people who do not personally live in the units but rent them out or leave them empty.

In their April 2019, the Bank of Canada concluded that Canada's housing market is "currently in uncharted territory" as they monitored the impact of the new mortgage rules. While the report does not use the word "bubble," it instead uses the term "froth," to describe "resales exceeding fundamentals" in Vancouver and Toronto in 2015-2016 and "extrapolative expectations." The IMF was more straightforward, noting that the risk in Canada had grown and was near levels seen during the U.S. financial crisis a decade prior. The Bank for International Settlements found Canada to be the only country in their analysis that presented warning indicators in all four categories of financial stress.

House prices did not drop significantly during this time, but rather stagnated through 2019.

=== Pandemic 2020 to 2021 ===
The housing market experienced a brief slowdown during the onset of the pandemic, especially for condos in larger cities. In response to the pandemic, the Bank of Canada slashed interest rates three times in one month and reduced the mortgage "stress test" rate, which enabled buyers to qualify for slightly larger mortgages. Prices soon rebounded. By June 2020, detached home prices had increased in 95% of Toronto districts, with double-digit increases in most (55%) of them.

This defied many predictions, including those by the CMHC, which had forecasted prices falling by 9–18% and for house prices and sales to not recover their pre-pandemic levels until 2023 onwards. Instead, by the end of 2021, the Canadian Real Estate Association's House Price Index had risen by 26.6%, the fastest annual pace on record. Incomes did not keep up. Condominiums accounted for the bulk of new housing in BC (54%) and Ontario (59%), where sales rose 71% yoy and investors constituted an increasing share of the buyers of these units (41% in Ontario).

On February 23, 2021, Bank of Canada Governor Tiff Macklem said the Bank was only starting to see "early" signs of "excessive exuberance". In a Q&A, he said the Bank was not considering any additional measures to cool the market, saying: "We need the growth." While other countries were attempting to cool their overheated markets, Canada was not, citing concerns about the economic recovery. The Bank indicated that it would continue to hold firm on low interest rates until likely 2023, resisting calls from investors and economists that higher rates were needed. However, by mid-June, with fiscal spending booming and households flush with cash from stimulus, investors expected the Bank of Canada to begin raising rates in 2022.

Zoom towns, popular with remote workers, were experiencing growth at the expense of major urban centres. Notably:

From July 1, 2019 to July 1, 2020, Toronto and Montreal posted record population losses, while Halifax grew the second-fastest of any major urban area, and Moncton also grew faster than average. Housing prices have soared as people across Canada buy property in the Maritimes sight unseen through virtual tours, with Fredericton’s U-Haul dealer struggling to keep up with all the people renting moving trucks in Ontario and Quebec and trying to drop them off at its lot.

During the COVID-19 pandemic, while the housing sector grew, much of the rest of the Canadian economy did not. Jeremy Kronick, associate director of research at the C.D. Howe Institute summarized "data from Statistics Canada show that, for the first time on record, investment in the housing market is now greater than 50 per cent of all investment in the Canadian economy".

=== 2022 Price peak ===
On January 26, 2022, the Bank of Canada announced their expectation that "interest rates will need to increase." The Bank of Canada began hiking interest rates on March 2, 2022, which would normally impact prices 12 to 18 months later (i.e. March- September 2023). However, Canada's average home price began to decline rapidly after peaking in February 2022, before interest rate increases, but after the announcement. The Teranet-National Bank House Price Index peaked a few months later, in May 2022, before dropping 10%, the "largest contraction in the index ever recorded" since it began in 1999.

The net worth of Canadian households (assets minus liabilities) fell by a staggering $990.1 billion in April, May and June 2022.

Later that same month, Oxford Economics forecasted a 24% drop in Canadian home prices by mid-2024, unless higher interest rates and anti-speculation policies fail. Were home prices to rise further (in this latter scenario), a crash of 40% and a financial crisis was to be expected.

The average and median prices for detached houses declined by almost $400,000 in the Greater Toronto Area by September 2022. Contractions in CREA's MLS® house price index from 2022 to January 2023 were especially pronounced in southwestern Ontario (London -26%, Cambridge -25%, Kitchener-Waterloo -25%, Brantford -24%) and southern Ontario (Hamilton -23%, the Niagara region -20%)

Lance Lambert, co-founder and editor of ResiClub media and research company, attributed regional disparities in real estate markets to demand being more elastic than supply (i.e. demand changes more quickly than supply) when he noted that overheated pandemic boom markets in the US cooled faster than those that didn't increase as much in 2021.

The Bank of Canada hiked the overnight interest rate 10 times between March 2022 and July 2023 bringing the target interest rate from 0.25% to 5% to combat inflation.

=== 2023 Price bounce and peak unaffordability ===
The IMF concluded that "Canada runs the highest risk of mortgage defaults among advanced economies" in their May 2023 report comparing 38 countries. Canada's residential housing stock was valued at 3.1 times GDP in 2023 after the average home price peaked in 2022, prices having more than doubled since 2011.

By October 2023, housing sales had slowed (-17% compared to pre-pandemic) while prices stabilized. Regional disparities were noticeable with month over month House Price Index up in more affordable markets such as Calgary (+9.4%) and Moncton (+12%), to the highest or near-highest levels on record while prices in larger, more expensive markets such as Toronto (-1.7%) and Vancouver (-0.6%) remained flat. The impact at the national level was a wash, with HPI increasing by 1.1% year over year.

The combination of high prices and rising interest rates led to housing being the most unaffordable it had ever been in Canada since RBC began tracking affordability in 1986, requiring the median income earner to save for over 26 years for the downpayment on the median home in Toronto, or over 34 years in Vancouver. Unaffordability peaked at the end of 2023.

=== 2024 Sales drop, inventory increase ===
Price changes were not significant compared to changes in number of sales and inventory, particularly in condo markets. The average selling price of a home in Canada decreased by 3.9% year-over-year to $724,800 in July 2024. Sales of new condo units in the first half of the year fell 57% from the previous year, marking the slowest pace in 27 years in Toronto and all housing inventory in Vancouver increased by 39% compared to the year prior, rising above the 10-year average. In October 2024, renters stayed put, with turnover at the lowest rate CMHC had tracked since data collection began in 2016.

=== 2025 Condo crash ===
Housing affordability continued to improve through 2025 in Vancouver and Toronto due to house price decreases in these areas and declining interest rates.

== Decline in productivity ==
Concerns regarding productivity were a focus in 2024, with Chief Economist Leith van Onselen attributing Canada's poor labour productivity (as well as Australia's) to the countries' heavy dependence on housing and immigration to drive growth, contrasting them with the US. Canada's Real GDP per capita had barely experienced any growth in a decade, while labour productivity had not grown since 2018. "Construction has generated no productivity growth over the past forty years!” lamented chief economists at TD Bank, while construction grew to surpass manufacturing in labour hours, increasing its negative impact on the whole. The OECD forecasted Canada’s per-capita real GDP growth to be last among advanced economies for the next 40 years.

== Investor/speculator impact ==
Investor activity (measured as the percentage of non-owner-occupied homes) increased both housing price appreciation and price collapse during the 2008 financial crisis. Investor activity peaked in 2005, with over 29% of new mortgages in Las Vegas taken out for investment properties. In Vancouver in 2020, nearly 48% of condos, and 33% of all housing was owned by investors; while in Toronto, 21% of all housing, and 56.7% of condos were investor owned although closer to 70% of pre-construction condos were purchased by investors. Investors were found to be increasingly crowding out prospective first-time buyers in a 2024 analysis.

Housing investors are most often individual residents of Canada but many properties are held opaquely through corporations. It is unknown how many properties are owned by institutional investors, including public pension funds. The top pension funds, such as the Canada Pension Plan Investment Board, Ontario Teachers' Pension Plan, and Ontario Municipal Employees Retirement System(OMERS), own residential rentals across Canada. The share of housing held by corporations and institutions in Ontario is 7.6%, and in British Columbia, 10.0%. Canadian pension funds have been considered "overweight" in their real estate portfolios in comparison to international peers.

Although less than 4% of investors are non-residents of Canada, the federal government placed a temporary ban on foreign buyers from January 1, 2023, until January 1, 2027. In British Columbia and Ontario, only around 20% of condos are owned by "in-province" investors. There is a debate on which group of investors, foreign or domestic, play a bigger role in driving rising prices. Foreign buyers may have a disproportionate impact on the housing market, as reports by CMHC and IMF concluded that rising prices in Toronto and Vancouver cannot be entirely explained by credit conditions (interest rates and mortgage regulations are similar from coast to coast), income growth, or demographic factors. This leaves either a chronic lack of supply, or, non-resident buying and financial speculation as primary variables to consider.

Ways in which foreign buyers may have disproportionately impacted house prices:

Setting prices at high levels. In Vancouver, the single-detached homes owned by non-residents were assessed at $707,000 more than local owners on average. In Toronto, the difference is about $100,000. Non-resident buyers may be pulling up the price on all ‘comparable’ properties. By pulling up prices in one segment of the market, households who are priced out of luxury units may start to bid up prices elsewhere, generating a ripple effect ‘downmarket’.

Foreign buyers do not include:

- Non-resident students attending Canadian universities
- New immigrants who arrive with substantial amounts of wealth earned abroad
- Residents who live in a 'satellite' family where the primary income earner lives abroad
- Foreign money that is laundered in local real estate through shell companies.

== Money laundering ==
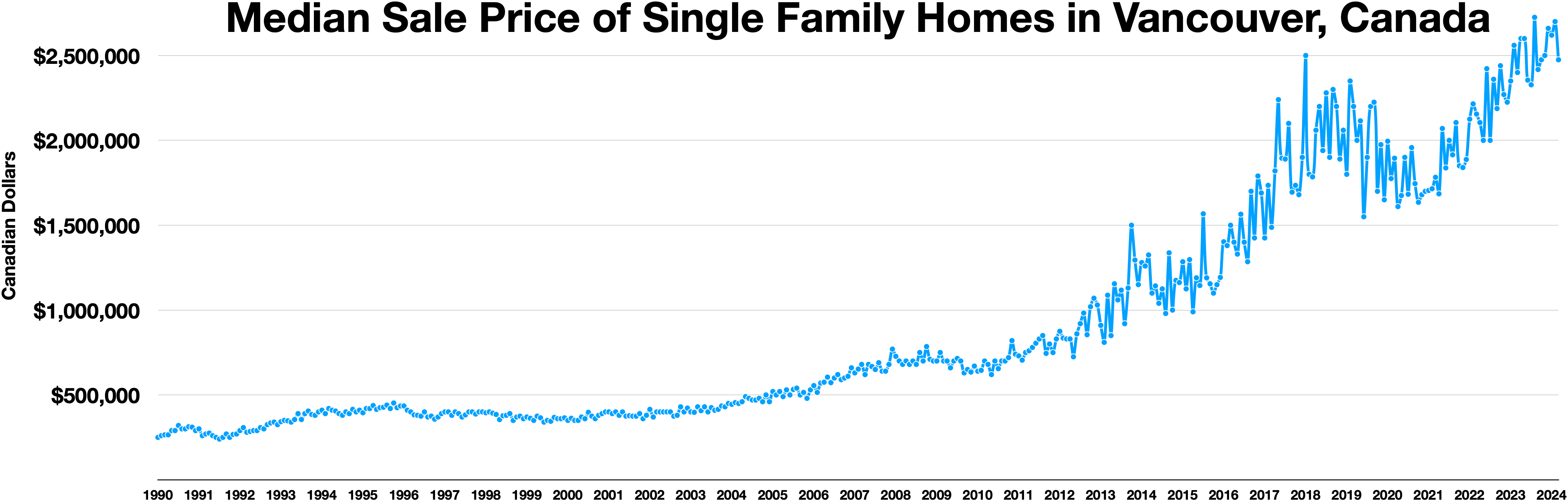
Vancouver home prices

A suspected contributor to Canada's real estate price growth is "The Vancouver Model" of money laundering. Stephen Schneider, criminology professor at St. Mary's University in Halifax stated "I've never seen such a big operation … that is so geographically confined." in his contribution to the Cullen Commission, which is an ongoing public inquiry into money laundering in British Columbia, led by B.C. Supreme Court Justice Austin Cullen. The Cullen Commission estimated that in 2019 alone, $5.3 Billion of illicit funds was laundered through the Vancouver real estate market, which increased housing prices by 5%.

"The Vancouver Model" is a way for Chinese organized crime to launder revenue generated primarily by fentanyl sales through casinos.

In 2016, Transparency International Canada found that 33% of the most valuable residential real estate in Vancouver was owned by shell companies and at least 11% have a nominee listed on their title.

Transparency International Canada also studied corporate ownership of Greater Toronto residential real estate and found that between 2008 and 2018, $20 billion of purchases were made using over 50,000 corporations with no checks and balances to determine the beneficial owners or source of funds. Roughly $9.8 Billion (49%) of those purchases were "all cash buys," i.e. no mortgage debt was used for the purchases. In addition, roughly $10 Billion (50%) of the same corporate purchases used mortgages from private unregulated lenders. In contrast, only 11% of households purchase real estate with "all cash" and 3% use private lenders.

Transparency International Canada has highlighted that part of the problem is lack of data. They reported that availability of real estate ownership data varies by province and was hidden behind a paywall.

In 2018, the BC government convened an Expert Panel on Money Laundering in B.C. Real Estate. The resulting report recommended the disclosure of beneficial ownership, among other steps the government could take to address money laundering in the province. In May 2019, the BC government passed an Act which led to the launching of the Land Owner Transparency Registry of BC on November 30, 2020. The registry opened to public search on April 30, 2021.

== Supply/Demand ==
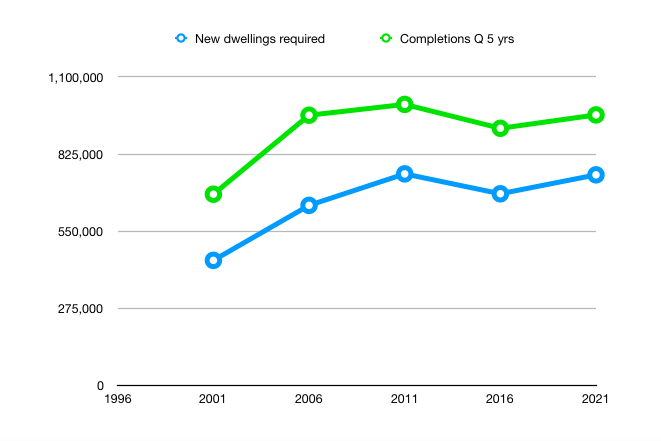
Created by uploader based on Statistics Canada data

Demand-supply imbalance in the housing market is an oft-cited cause for increased housing prices, with proposed solutions most often focused on increasing supply. However, the proportion of investors purchasing homes began outpacing first-time and repeat homebuyers in 2021. Investors acquire, specifically: recently built housing, and the most affordable housing that is for sale (i.e. condo apartments). This raises serious doubts about the extent to which increasing market-rate housing supply can expand “attainable” housing for non-investors.

In addition, multiple studies suggest that Canadian housing supply has been sufficient for decades. A study by the International Monetary Fund (IMF) in 2018 concluded that Canada was the 2nd most responsive to housing demand of 20 advanced economies. Pomeroy found "little evidence of a chronic undersupply" Canada-wide, or in Canada's eight largest metropolitan areas. Bank of Montreal (BMO) Chief Economist Doug Porter summarized "Over the past 45 years or so, the ratio [of housing starts to growth in working age population] has typically been about 0.60 (about one new build for every 1.7 additional adult)” Another 2022 analysis by BMO highlighted that over the past two decades, Canada’s housing stock has grown at a faster rate than new households formed. It concludes that “the country doesn’t have a supply problem so much as an affordability problem due to recurring waves of excess demand pressure.” Between 2001 and 2021, there were 16,000 more new housing units than new households in Montreal and 17,000 in Quebec City. Vancouver, the city with the fastest increase in home values, tripled the number of homes between 1970 and 2020, "... but the population only rose by around 70 per cent. No other major city in North America can claim a comparable feat: New York City increased its housing stock by only 30 per cent over the same period, and Los Angeles and San Francisco had similarly modest gains."

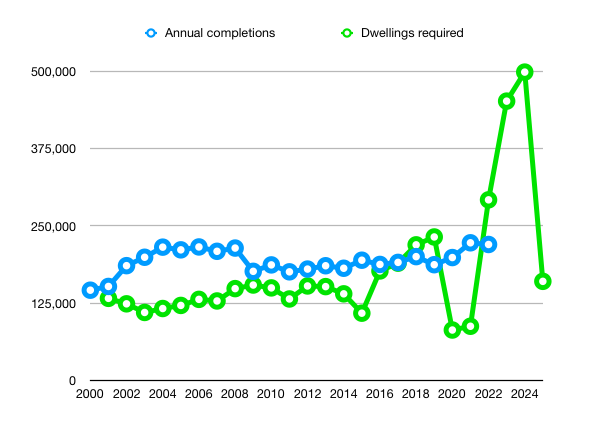
Created by uploader based on Statistics Canada data from statcan.gc.ca

When comparing annual Canadian Census population estimates to housing completions from 2001 to 2022, the number of housing completions exceeded household formation in 19 of the 22 years measured (accounting for household size decreasing from 2.6 in 2001 to 2.4 in 2021).

Suggestions that housing supply does not keep pace with population growth may be failing to account for household size. Such as in the Fraser Institute's emphasis that increased population growth outpaced housing completions in 2022.

Housing filtering theory (resembling trickle-down economics), proposes that once newly built housing, inhabited by wealthy occupants, declines in quality and value over time, it should then become accessible to lower income households. A Quebec report found that in Canada, this was not playing out, much like trickle-down economics, which has been shown to be ineffective and increase inequality. Many homes had gained value over time. Other examples of housing filtering not working is that one-fifth of first time home buyers never rented and multiple-property owners possessed 30% of housing stock in BC and Ontario. Finally, despite Montreal’s vacancy rate going up in 2024, so did rent. Zuk et al. found dozens of studies illustrating the failure of house filtering theory in their 2015 literature review.

== Risks ==
Canada is a nation heavily dependent on the real estate industry which accounted for roughly 14% of its GDP in 2020 and over 20% in 2023. There is a high risk that if investor sentiment changes, buyer demand may drop significantly, triggering a vicious cycle of prices declines that snowball. Canadians hold increasing mortgage debt (almost $2 trillion in June 2021, $2.16 trillion residential in 2023) while unemployment rose and net employment fell in 2024.

Short-term fixed-rate mortgages are dominant in Canada, typically with the interest rate locked in for five years. This contrasts with the United States, where most homeowners hold long-term fixed-rate mortgage contracts. If the reset rate in five, ten, or fifteen years is higher than in the past, there will be a large risk of default for Canadians with high amounts of debt. A July 2017 report noted that uninsured mortgages represent the greatest risk to the financial industry. A decreasing number of Canadian mortgages are backed by insurance, from over 60% in 2012 to less than 22% in 2022. Drops in home prices could cause homeowners to owe more on their mortgages than the house is currently valued, which is known as negative equity.
