= Bliss and Wisdom =

Buddhist organization

- Bliss and Wisdom logo
- Established: 1991
- Founder: Master Jih-Chang (d. 2004)
- Type: Buddhist organization
- Headquarters: Taiwan
- Region served: Canada, United States, several Asian countries
- Leader: Master Zhen-Ru

Bliss and Wisdom (Chinese: 福智; pinyin: Fúzhì) is a Taiwanese Buddhist organization operating in the Canadian province of Prince Edward Island. Founded in 1991 by Master Jih-Chang, the organization arrived in the province in 2008 and has come under scrutiny for its significant acquisitions of land. A citizens group estimates that Bliss and Wisdom has acquired over 17,000 acres of land in Prince Edward Island, contravening the province's land protection legislation. The provincial government of Prince Edward Island launched an investigation into Bliss and Wisdom's landholdings in February 2025.

The organization has extensive business holdings in the areas of jewellery, electronics, organic farming, translation, and exporting. They operate a natural foods retailer based in Taiwan called Leezen, which opened its first overseas store in Charlottetown in 2016.

== Background ==
Bliss and Wisdom is a Taiwanese Buddhist organization founded in 1991 by Master Jih-Chang. After his death in 2004, Master Zhen-Ru (Note: Zhen-Ru's birth name has been reported as Meng Rong Jin, Mengrong Jin, or Jin Mengrong. She has also been referred to as Mary Jin, and was reportedly born in China.) became leader of the organization. She led Bliss and Wisdom's move into the Canadian province of Prince Edward Island, arriving in 2008. The organization underwent significant expansion under Zhen-Ru's leadership; they claim that their number of students has increased from 20,000 to 100,000 since she assumed leadership, with over 800 monks and 600 nuns. Bliss and Wisdom is based in Taiwan, and has operations throughout Canada, the United States, and several Asian countries.

The Dalai Lama does not recognize Zhen-Ru as the spiritual leader of Bliss and Wisdom. Kelsang Gyaltsen, the official representative of the Dalai Lama in Taiwan, states that "Zhen-Ru is a layperson who has not undergone monastic ordination. Someone without formal ordination and precept training cannot be recognized as the leader of the monastic community." Gyaltsen noted that the Dalai Lama does recognize the monks and nuns of Bliss and Wisdom.

== Operations in PEI ==
External audio
- How a group of Buddhist monks bought up a chunk of PEI. – The Globe and Mail (20:32 min)

Bliss and Wisdom arrived in Kings County, Prince Edward Island in 2008, when they moved into an old motel called the Lobster Shanty in Montague. The organization operates five campuses in the province: the Great Enlightenment Buddhist Institute Society (GEBIS) and Great Wisdom Buddhist Institute (GWBI) are attended by Taiwanese students, while three others are attended exclusively by Chinese students. Some residents questioned the organization's choice to establish itself in Prince Edward Island. In 2018, amid growing concerns regarding Bliss and Wisdom's land acquisitions, the provincial government rejected a proposed sale of 20 acres near Heatherdale from a local farmer to the organization. In September 2020, the municipal council of Three Rivers voted to deny a building permit to Bliss and Wisdom for the construction of a monastic campus and dormitory in Brudenell. As a result of the denial, some of the organization's students had to return home due to overcrowding at their campuses, and plans to construct additional facilities were put on hold.

A citizens group known as Coalition for the Protection of P.E.I. Lands estimates that Bliss and Wisdom and its affiliates have purchased over 17,000 acres of land in the province, (Note: 17,000 acres of land is equivalent to 1/4 of the land in Taipei City.) drawing significant community opposition. In contrast, The Guardian of Charlottetown reported that their investigation only counted 1,251 acres owned by the group. According to The Globe and Mail, much of the land purchased by Bliss and Wisdom is owned by individual members of the organization, making it difficult to track their land holdings. Spokespeople from Bliss and Wisdom claim that its members are purchasing land of their own accord to be near their campuses.

The land acquisitions of Bliss and Wisdom have raised concerns over compliance with the province's Lands Protection Act, which limits individuals to 1,000 acres and corporations to 3,000 acres of arable land, with non-residents restricted to five acres purchased after a 90-day public listing period. Critics allege that Bliss and Wisdom exploit loopholes in the province's land protection legislation by using a network of followers and affiliated companies to purchase properties, many of which are left vacant, inflating real estate prices in rural communities. In a 2023 statement, Bliss and Wisdom asserted that they only owned 577 acres at one campus and 670 acres at another, well within the limit set by the act.

In February 2025, the provincial government of Prince Edward Island launched an investigation into the land acquisitions of Bliss and Wisdom. Stephen Myers, the Minister of Housing, Land and Communities, directed the Island Regulatory and Appeals Commission to investigate the direct and indirect land holdings of the organization. In a statement, Myers said that residents have "valid concerns" regarding land ownership by the organization, adding that "it's important too that these discussions are based on evidence, not assumptions". In March, the municipal council of Three Rivers approved a development application from GWBI to construct two buildings in Brudenell, totaling 88,000 square feet of space. One councillor moved to delay the vote, but his motion did not pass, and the development application was approved by a vote of 6-2.

A book documenting the controversy, titled Canada Under Siege: How P.E.I. Became a Forward Operating Base for the Chinese Communist Party, was released in June 2025. The book was written by Michel Juneau-Katsuya, former CSIS investigator; Garry Clement, former RCMP investigator; and Dean Baxendale, the CEO of Optimum Publishing. 205 pages in length, Canada Under Siege chronicles prior scandals involving the provincial nominee program, focusing largely on Bliss and Wisdom's operations. At the launch of the book in Charlottetown, the former solicitor general Wayne Easter and the authors called for a public inquiry into Bliss and Wisdom's landholdings and foreign affiliations. The authors allege that Bliss and Wisdom has ties to the Chinese government, and that their presence in the province constitutes a national security threat.

In October 2025, the Prince Edward Island standing committee on natural resources and environmental sustainability subpoenaed the Island Regulatory and Appeals Commission (IRAC) to provide their "2018 investigative report into land holdings of Buddhist organizations on Prince Edward Island". IRAC claimed in response that no investigative report on the topic exists, and provided conflicting information on when the investigation began; in an earlier letter, IRAC claimed that the investigation began in 2018, but while responding to the subpoena, IRAC said the investigation began in 2016. The chair of IRAC, Pamela Williams, said that "in 2017, the consultant prepared both an 'initial' and 'supplementary' report, and provided those reports to special counsel". She added that while "special counsel provided both of those reports, on a privileged basis, to the investigating officers", IRAC decided not to prepare a final report.

On 16 October 2025, the Premier of Prince Edward Island Rob Lantz released two letters he sent to the RCMP and FINTRAC requesting that they address the allegations made against Bliss and Wisdom pertaining to money laundering and foreign interference. Lantz stated in the letter that "we ask the RCMP to give this matter prompt attention. Allegations of this nature – whether found to be substantiated or not – have the potential to erode public trust and confidence in our democratic institutions". The RCMP responded in a statement on 20 October confirming that the allegations against Bliss and Wisdom were previously investigated, with the police determining that the allegations were baseless. The RCMP received reports regarding money laundering and foreign interference as early as 2015, but their investigation found no evidence of money laundering or any criminal activity in respect to their land acquisitions. The statement from the RCMP added that "in light of new information and allegations", the RCMP Federal Policing Eastern Region would be reviewing the investigation to determine whether further action was warranted.

== Operations in New York ==
In 2024, the Great Enlightenment Buddhist Institute Society (GEBIS) purchased the 240-acre Honor's Haven Retreat and Conference Centre in Upstate New York. Geoffrey Yang, the executive secretary of GEBIS, estimated that there were hundreds of lay followers of the organization within New York state. He stated that GEBIS planned to operate the venue as a hotel and retreat centre.

== Business operations ==
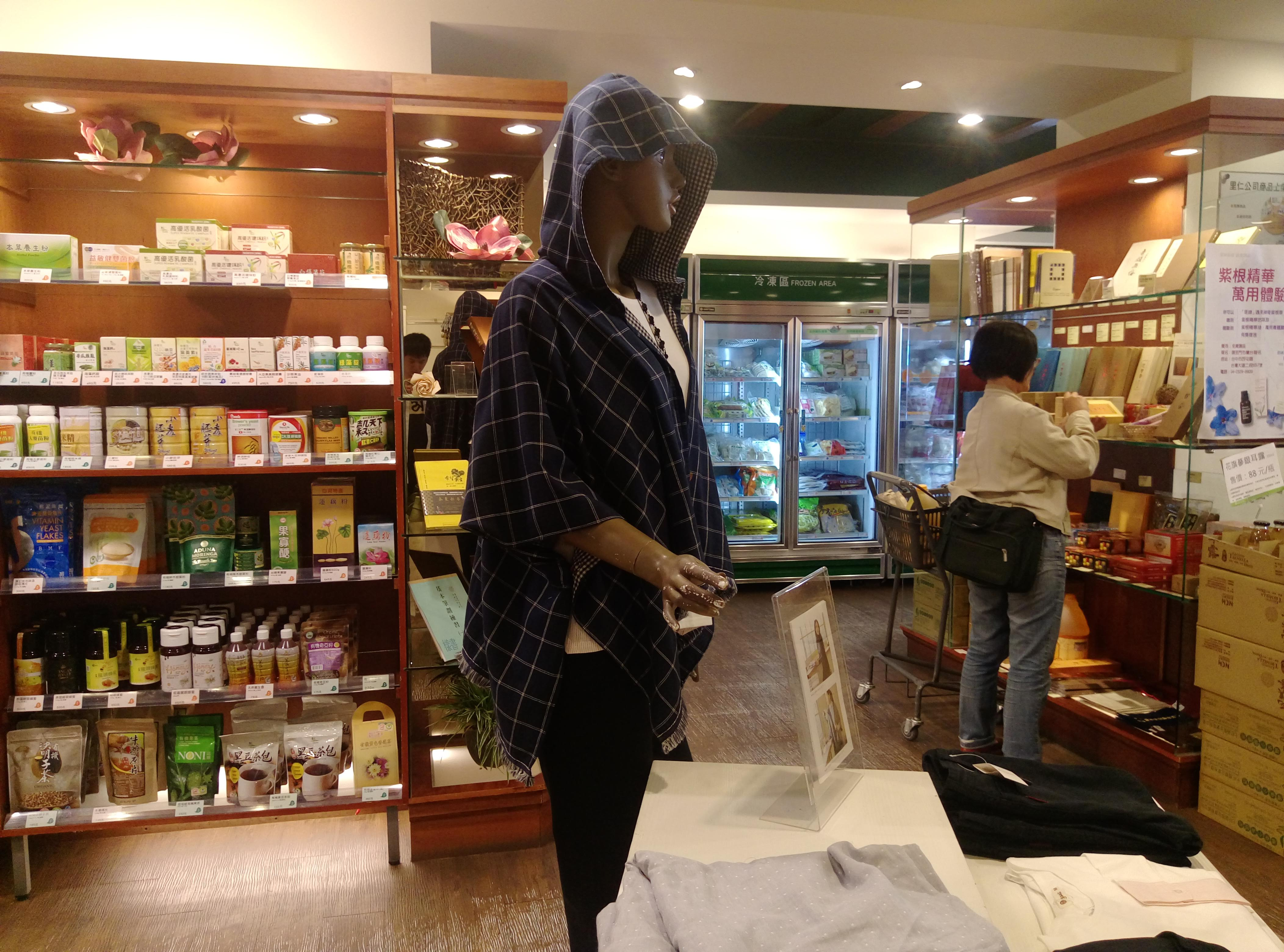
Bliss and Wisdom owns Leezen, a chain of natural product retailers

Bliss and Wisdom has extensive business holdings in the areas of jewellery, electronics, organic farming, translation, and exporting. The group in Prince Edward Island has received hundreds of millions of dollars from foreign donations and their businesses in Taiwan and China. Bliss and Wisdom is the owner of Leezen, a chain of retail stores selling natural products. Leezen originates from the establishment of the Tse-Xin Organic Agriculture Foundation (Chinese: 慈心大地) in the late 1990s by close disciples of Jih-Chang, the founder of Bliss and Wisdom. Members of Bliss and Wisdom founded the exporting company Grain Essence Garden in 2011, which began exporting Prince Edward Island products to Taiwan for sale at Leezen. The chain opened their first store outside of Taiwan in 2016, located in Charlottetown. Members of Bliss and Wisdom also operate a vegetarian restaurant in Charlottetown called Splendid Essence.
