= Project Sidewinder =

Canadian intelligence report

- Created: 1997
- Location: Canada
- Commissioned by: Government of Canada
- Author(s): RCMP, Canadian Security Intelligence Service
- Subject: China, Money laundering, Organized Crime

Project Sidewinder (officially Project Ricewater: Chinese Intelligence Services and Triads Financial Links in Canada; sometimes called Operation Sidewinder) is a declassified study conducted by a Canadian Security Intelligence Service (CSIS) and Royal Canadian Mounted Police (RCMP) joint task force. It controversially argues Chinese intelligence and Triads have been working together on intelligence operations in Canada. The report was headed by former Asia Pacific Chief, Michel Juneau Katsuya. He later collaborated with various US counterparts who were investigating the links between Organized Crime (Criminal Triads), the Chinese Communist Party and Chinese business tycoons. Dubbed the Unholy Trinity by the U.S. Department of Justice in a later named collaboration between 5 US agencies including the FBI, DEA, DIA, NSIA and CIA. Dubbed Dragon Lord, a summary of the report was uncovered by former military intelligence analyst Scott McGregor and Documentary Journalist Ina Mitchell and published in their book The Mosaic Effect in October 2023.

== Overview ==
The Project Sidewinder study was conducted by a joint Canadian intelligence task force, composed of members of the Canadian Security Intelligence Service (CSIS) and the Royal Canadian Mounted Police (RCMP) in 1997.

The study's authors allege after submitting the first draft, political interference led to the project being sidelined. Canada's top spymaster is also accused of destroying evidence related to his case.

Letters between CSIS and the RCMP reveal the report had been altered. The RCMP accused CSIS of altering the report in a way that ultimately undermined its integrity. CSIS acknowledged it altered the reports but maintains it was due to a disagreement of facts.

A review by Canada's Security Intelligence Review Committee (SIRC) followed the leak. It concludes there is no threat that is ignored by the country's intelligence. As of 2021, academics say it is still unclear if that means the threat is overstated, or if intelligence is adequately monitoring the situation.

In 2010, then director of CSIS Richard Fadden appeared on CBC News, and hinted the allegations are true. According to Fadden, the spy agency had been monitoring several members of British Columbia's municipal governments, due to the belief they are under the influence of foreign governments. He also alleged two provincial members of the Crown are under the influence of China, but declined to say which provinces.

Fadden downplayed the seriousness of his allegations the following week, days ahead of the arrival of China's premier for the G20 Summit in Canada.

Researchers cite the report as a long line of evidence showing the influence operations of the United Front in Canada.

In 2021, Michel Juneau-Katsuya, one of the officers that worked on the original project testified to the Parliament of Canada they believe the evidence to be true. They cited an incident identified by Elections Canada, where they had found Chinese embassies had donated to political parties. This had been one of the key allegations made in Project Sidewinder.

== Key allegations ==
- A number of Canadian politicians are under the influence of Chinese intelligence. “The triads, the tycoons, and ChIS have learned the quick way to gain influence is to provide finance to the main political parties. Most of the companies identified in this research have contributed, sometimes several tens of thousands of dollars, to the two traditional parties, that is, the Liberal and Progressive-Conservative Parties,” reads the allegations.
- Over 200 businesses are “secretly” under the control of the Chinese Communist Party.
- Chinese intelligence is avoiding a crackdown in exchange for sharing influence in Canada.
- Canadian real estate was bought and used by China in an organized fashion to sway local politics.
- Chinese Intelligence Service (ChIS) uses specialists, students, and shell companies to “pursue their acquisition of economic intelligence.”
- A section in the report is titled “University of Toronto and University of Western Ontario,” but the allegations were redacted even in the leaked copy.

== Criticism ==
The report was dismissed by the Canadian intelligence community, controversially dismissing its findings. At the time they don't support the findings of the report, and the analytic work wasn't up to standard.

Subsequent findings weren't so clear. Analysts that worked on the report filed a complaint with Security Intelligence Review Committee (SIRC). SIRC's findings generally support the findings of the report, but dismissed the suggestion that Canada is unaware of any threats not monitored by intelligence agencies.

== Money laundering inquiry ==
In 2017, the Government of BC hired lawyer and former RCMP deputy commissioner Peter German to investigate a number of themes brought up in the Sidewinder Report, resulting in the Dirty Money report. The report found money laundering by organized crime had become rampant at Canadian casinos. A second volume of the report would later show a large share of the funds were the proceeds from fentanyl sales, and were subsequently “layered” into home purchases after being initially washed in the casinos.

The findings in Dirty Money support many of the findings in Project Sidewinder. As an independent report, those findings were the basis of the Cullen Commission, BC's inquiry into money laundering.

== In popular media ==
The report sparked a number of investigations and national security books covering the allegations. One, Nest of Spies, is written by some of the former intelligence agents that authored the report.

In 2021, Wilful Blindness by Sam Cooper was published, covering how the allegations in Sidewinder evolved into larger scale operations.
