= Leezen (supermarket) =

Taiwanese company

Leezen Company Ltd.
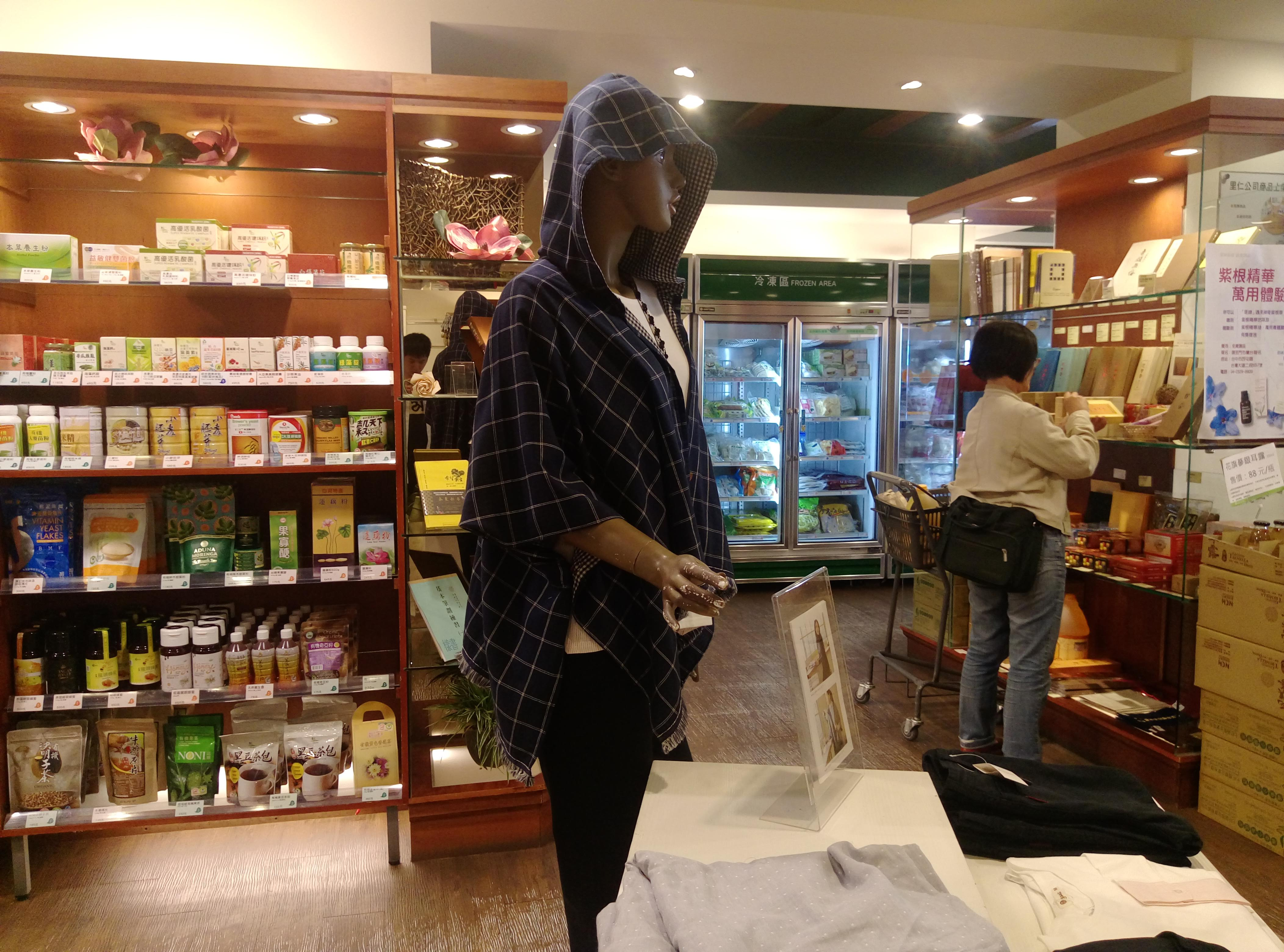
- Native name: 里仁事業股份有限公司
- Company type: Private / social enterprise
- Industry: Organic & sustainable retail, food & consumer goods
- Founded: January 1998
- Founder: Nichang
- Number of locations: 135 stores in Taiwan; 3 in Canada; 17 in the United States; 1 each in Malaysia, Singapore, Brunei; 4 in China
- Area served: Taiwan (and some overseas distribution)
- Key people: Li Miaoling (李妙玲, Chair)
- Website: www.leezen.com.tw

Leezen (Chinese: 里仁, also known as 里仁事業股份有限公司, "Leezen Company Ltd.") is a Taiwanese chain of natural products retailers. The company is owned and operated by Bliss and Wisdom, a Taiwanese Buddhist organization.

== History ==
Leezen originates from the establishment of the Tse-Xin Organic Agriculture Foundation (Chinese: 慈心大地) in the late 1990s by close disciples of Jih-Chang, the founder of Bliss and Wisdom.

In January 1998, the first Leezen shop opened in Keelung, and Leezen Company Ltd. was formally incorporated in February 1998.In June 1998, Leezen began stocking locally produced organic "Black Beauty" watermelons despite their pale appearance, as a statement of support for farmers in conversion.

In 2011, members of Bliss and Wisdom founded the exporting company Grain Essence Garden, which began exporting Prince Edward Island products to Taiwan for sale at Leezen. Leezen opened their first overseas location in Charlottetown, Prince Edward Island in 2016.

== Scale and operations ==
As of recent reports, Leezen collaborates with over 500 food and goods manufacturers and owns over 766 hectares of farmland. It distributes over 4,500 tonnes of organic produce annually, and carries more than 3,000 organic/vegetarian products across its store network.

Leezen operates 135 physical stores across Taiwan, as well as 3 in Canada, 17 in the United States, 1 each in Malaysia, Singapore, Brunei and 4 in China (including Hong Kong and Macau).

== Controversies ==
- In 2013 during Taiwan's "toxin starch" scandal, a tofu product sold through Leezen and others was found to contain maleic acid. Leezen and partner channels came under public scrutiny.
- In 2015, Greenpeace randomly sampled fresh produce sold by various organic channels and found papaya from Leezen containing bifenthrin residue; Leezen responded that contamination derived from an organic input (tobacco powder) used by farmers, and promised stronger controls.
- In 2016, Taichung City Government's health bureau inspected hotpot products sold through major channels and found Leezen’s hotpot ingredients exceeded microbial limits; they were ordered to be withdrawn or improved.
- In 2017, Leezen announced it would suspend cooperation with a tofu manufacturer (“Quansheng Old House”) after exposure of illegal labor and mistreatment of foreign workers; all its tofu products from that supplier were delisted.
