= Countering Foreign Interference Act =

Canadian federal legislation

Parliament of Canada
- Long title: An Act respecting countering foreign interference
- Citation: S.C. 2024, c. 16
- Considered by: House of Commons of Canada
- Considered by: Senate of Canada
- Royal assent: June 20, 2024

Legislative history

Initiating chamber: House of Commons of Canada
- Bill citation: Bill C-70
- Introduced by: Dominic LeBlanc, Minister of Public Safety, Democratic Institutions and Intergovernmental Affairs
- First reading: May 6, 2024
- Second reading: May 29, 2024
- Considered in committee: May 30, June 3, 4, 5, 6, 10, 2024
- Third reading: June 13, 2024

Revising chamber: Senate of Canada
- Member(s) in charge: Tony Dean
- First reading: June 13, 2024
- Second reading: June 17, 2024
- Considered in committee: June 18, 2024
- Third reading: June 19, 2024
- Status: In force

The Countering Foreign Interference Act (French: Loi sur la lutte contre l'ingérence étrangère), introduced as Bill C-70, is an act of the Parliament of Canada with the objective of countering foreign interference in Canadian democratic processes. The legislation consists of four parts, with the first three parts consisting of amendments to the Canadian Security Intelligence Service Act, the newly renamed Foreign Interference and Security of Information Act plus the Criminal Code, and the Canada Evidence Act, respectively. The fourth part enacts the Foreign Influence Transparency and Accountability Act, which establishes a public registry of foreign agents.

The act was introduced by Justin Trudeau's government and came in the wake of official probes into Chinese interference in the 2019 and 2021 federal elections and the killing of Hardeep Singh Nijjar, and the high degree of public concern these events generated among Canadians, especially among diaspora communities. It was unanimously supported by all the political parties in Parliament, who also agreed to expedite its passage to ensure it could be in effect before the 2025 federal election.

== Background ==
On November 7, 2022, Global News published an article describing Chinese attempts to interfere in the 2019 Canadian federal election. The article, which quoted anonymous sources with the Canadian Security Intelligence Service (CSIS), ignited a political firestorm. Following the report, Prime Minister Justin Trudeau condemned China, but defended the government's handling of the interference operation, stating that civil servants had determined "the integrity of our elections was not compromised".

Several probes were launched by parliamentary committees and watchdogs in the wake of the reports. Trudeau initially resisted calls for a public inquiry by the opposition, however he eventually agreed and appointed Justice Marie-Josée Hogue to lead it. Hogue's report confirmed foreign interference in the 2019 and 2021 federal elections, predominantly by China, and identified its operation as "persistent and sophisticated".

Meanwhile, on June 13, 2023, Hardeep Singh Nijjar - a prominent advocate of the Khalistan movement - was killed by masked gunmen outside a Gurdwara in Surrey. His death immediately aroused suspicions in the local Sikh community that the government of India was involved. On September 18, Trudeau announced that investigators were pursuing credible allegations into Indian involvement in Nijjar's killing. The episode caused a diplomatic rift between Canada and India, and furthered increased public concern regarding foreign interference in Canada, especially among diaspora communities.

== Legislative history ==
On March 10, 2023, the Trudeau government launched public consultations on a foreign agent registry. This was followed by the launch of additional consultations on November 24, 2023, focusing on new criminal penalties and increased powers for the CSIS, both with an aim to combat foreign interference. On May 6, 2024, Public Safety and Democratic Institutions Minister Dominic LeBlanc tabled Bill C-70, the Countering Foreign Interference Act.

In a letter to LeBlanc, Conservative foreign affairs critic Michael Chong offered his party's help in expediting the bill so it may be enacted before the 2025 federal election. On May 29, the Conservatives moved a motion to do this, but the New Democratic Party (NDP) opposed it, denying unanimous consent and delaying the bill. The Party insisted on expert testimony on the bill, but expressed support in principle to fast-tracking it. The NDP proposed its own motion to expedite the bill - with a brief committee study - which was adopted by the House of Commons. On June 13, after roughly a week of committee study, the bill was unanimously approved by the House of Commons, winning the support of all parties. The Senate gave its approval to the bill on June 19, ensuring its passage before Parliament rose for summer recess. It received royal assent the following day.

== Provisions ==
The act consists of four parts.

Part 1 amended the Canadian Security Intelligence Service Act to increase the powers of the CSIS. It gives the CSIS the power to disclose information to entities outside the federal public sector to "build resiliency to threats", access to new warrant authorities for specific investigative techniques (as opposed to the general warrant authority it had before, with the same stringent standard regardless of the intrusiveness of the technique it was seeking authorization for), and a more streamlined ability to collect and query datasets. It also gives the CSIS - in certain circumstances - the authority to collect from within Canada, foreign intelligence outside Canada, using technology.

Part 2 amended the Security of Information Act - changing its name to the Foreign Interference and Security of Information Act - and the Criminal Code, creating new offences and broadening the scope of existing offences. These changes include the creation of a new offence of surreptitiously influencing a political process (such as a party nomination contest) at the direction of a foreign entity, and giving extraterritorial effect to the existing offence of using intimidation and threats at the direction of a foreign entity.

Part 3 amended the Canada Evidence Act to create a new standardized procedure for protecting classified information, regulating how and to whom such information may be disclosed in the course of judicial and administrative proceedings.

Part 4 enacted the Foreign Influence Transparency and Accountability Act. The act creates a new public registry of foreign agents. Under this scheme, anyone who enters into an "arrangement" under the direction of, or in association with, a "foreign principal" is required to report to the Foreign Influence Transparency Commissioner, a new independent officer of Parliament. Under the act, a "foreign principal" is a foreign state/power and its subnational components, anyone acting at their direction or for their benefit, political factions within them, and any entity controlled by them. An "arrangement" is defined as any scheme to influence a political or governmental process through communicating with a public office holder, public dissemination of information, or the provision of money or aid. The legislation is universal in scope and does not draw a distinction between friendly and unfriendly states, though the government is given the regulatory power to exempt certain types of activities in specified circumstances.
