= Michel Juneau-Katsuya =

Canadian intelligence agent

Michel Juneau-Katsuya is a former senior intelligence officer and manager at the Canadian Security Intelligence Service.

== Career ==
He started his career as a police officer with the Royal Canadian Mounted Police (RCMP) before transferring to the Canadian Security Intelligence Service (CSIS). He has performed duties as a criminal investigator, and intelligence officer in both counterintelligence and counterterrorism, and also as a strategic analyst on global and emerging issues.

In 1994, he stated that the most imminent threat to the world was not nuclear proliferation, but simple machetes - a prophecy he considers to have been fulfilled by the Rwandan genocide later.

Today he is the president and CEO of The Northgate Group, and sometimes cited in media stories as a source on international espionage.

== Works ==
He is the co-author with Fabrice de Pierrebourg of Nest of Spies: The Startling Truth About Foreign Agents At Work Within Canada's Border published in September 2009 (HarperCollins, ISBN 1554684498) and Ces espions venus d'ailleurs: Enquête sur les activités d'espionnage au Canada, published September 2009 (Stanké). These books reveal various spy activities in Canada and share some points on how to defend its company against it.

Juneau-Katsuya wrote the afterword in the book, The Mosaic Effect, co-authored by Canadian Military Intelligence Analyst, Scott McGregor and Journalist Ina Mitchell. In it, Juneau-Katsuya was critical of the Canadian Governments failure to recognize the threat of the People's Republic of China (PRC) in Canada saying "Regrettably, throughout my 40-year career I've, encountered all three of these attitudes from our Canadian political elite."

Together with the former RCMP investigator Garry Clement and the CEO of Optimum Publishing Dean Baxendale, Juneau-Katsuya co-authored Canada Under Siege: How P.E.I. Became a Forward Operating Base for the Chinese Communist Party, released in June 2025. The book chronicles scandals involving the provincial nominee program, focusing largely on the operations of the Taiwanese Buddhist organization Bliss and Wisdom.

== In Popular Media ==
In 2017, Juneau-Katsuya was interviewed in the documentary film "In the Name of Confucius" by Canadian filmmaker Doris Liu, the film, is about the controversies around one of China’s largest overseas soft-power initiatives, China’s Confucius Institutes (CI). He also participated in a panel discussion at the official Ottawa premiere screening held at the One World Film Festival on Sept. 30, 2017. Where he said that the CI is promoted as a Chinese language and cultural program, as a way “to collect information in order, eventually, for intelligence officers to target certain individuals that went to that institute to study."

In 2021, Juneau-Katsuya testified to the Parliament of Canada about Project Sidewinder, a joint Canadian intelligence task force, composed of members of the Canadian Security Intelligence Service (CSIS) and the Royal Canadian Mounted Police (RCMP) in 1997. Juneau-Katsuya was one of the officers who worked on the original project. In his testimony, Juneau-Katsuya said that he believed there was political interference leading to the shuttering of Project Sidewinder and that evidence was destroyed.
