= Jih-Chang =

Founder of Bliss and Wisdom

Venerable Jih-Chang
- 釋日常
- Born: 1929; Chongming County, Jiangsu, China
- Died: 2004 (aged 74–75)
- Other name: Bhikshu Tenzin Jamchen
- Occupation: Buddhist leader
- Years active: 1965–2004
- Known for: Founder of Bliss and Wisdom

Jih-Chang (Note: Jih-Chang is also rendered in English as Shi-Ri-Chang.) (1929 – 2004) was a Chinese Buddhist leader who founded Bliss and Wisdom.

== Biography ==
Jih-Chang (釋日常) was born in 1929 in Chongming County in the Chinese province of Jiangsu. As a child, he was taught the Four Books and Five Classics by his father. He immigrated to Taiwan with his uncle in 1947 during the Chinese Communist Revolution, where he took a position at the Tainan Institute of Technology's department of civil engineering.

In 1965, Jih-Chang became a Buddhist monk at Yuan Guang temple in Miaoli, Taiwan. He spent some time in the United States in the 1970s, studying zen with Philip Kapleau at the Rochester Zen Center in New York and teaching at the American Buddhist Association's Dajue Temple. Jih-Chang established a Tibetan Buddhist organization in Taiwan called the Fu-chih Buddhist Academy in 1987, where he began teaching from the Tibetan reformer Tsong-Kha-Pa's Extensive and Orderly Treatise on Perfect Wisdom. He established the Buddhist organization Bliss and Wisdom (福智) in 1991, and together with his close disciples established the Tse-Xin Organic Agriculture Foundation (慈心大地) in 1997. Under Jih-Chang's leadership, the foundation became a certified testing body for organic produce (Note: In 2010, a total of 433 Taiwanese farms had received an organic accreditation from the Tse-Xin Organic Agriculture Foundation.) and developed food without chemical additives for sale at their Leezen (里仁) supermarkets. In Canada, Jih-Chang facilitated the establishment of a temple at an 80-acre plot on the outskirts of Toronto, now the Great Enlightenment Buddhist Institute Society (GEBIS).

Jih-Chang died in 2004, and his disciple Zhen-Ru subsequently became the leader of Bliss and Wisdom. As a woman and a layperson, her appointment was controversial, and the Dalai Lama does not recognize her leadership.
