= Sam Cooper (journalist) =

Canadian investigative journalist

- Citizenship: Canadian
- Occupation: Journalist
- Known for: Investigative Journalism
- Notable work: Wilful Blindness
- Website: www.thebureau.news

Sam Cooper is a Canadian investigative journalist and author known for his coverage of Canada–China relations and tensions.

== Career ==
Cooper left the Postmedia newspapers to work for Global News, where his coverage on money laundering in Canada, alleging a relationship between foreign states colluding with organized crime.

Cooper turned his reporting into the controversial Wilful Blindness, which alleges Canadian officials intentionally ignored money laundering linked to organized crime based out of China. His work builds on allegations made in the Canadian-intelligence report Project Sidewinder, which argues spies have infiltrated the country's institutions.

== Reception ==
Cooper alleges Canadian senator Yuen Pau Woo lobbied on behalf of Beijing, as well as organized an attack on the credibility of Andy Yan, an academic at Simon Fraser University. Woo has publicly accused Cooper of failing to fact check the allegations, nor seeking his response before making said allegations.

In May 2020, the official WeChat group for Canadian Liberal Party of Canada politician Joyce Murray began fundraising to sue Cooper after he made allegations a Chinese-government group had begun to stockpile Canadian personal protective equipment at the start of the COVID-19 pandemic. Murray condemned the group's actions, and distanced herself for an organized attack against a journalist.

In March 2023, in an investigate report published for Global News, Cooper alleged that Liberal Party of Canada Member of Parliament Han Dong had advised a Chinese diplomat to extend the detention of Michael Spavor and Michael Kovrig. Following a subsequent libel lawsuit issued by Dong, Cooper's reporting was criticized by reporters and national security commentators for failing to verify his sources' claims, with the judge finding Global News had no documentary evidence supporting Cooper's claims. As part of a 2025 settlement with Dong, Global News issued a statement recognizing the findings of the final report of the Public Inquiry into Foreign Interference, which found that classified intelligence corroborated Dong's denial of Cooper's reporting.

In September 2024, Cooper published a report in The Bureau claiming to show video evidence of Bill Majcher, a former RCMP undercover operative accused of assisting Chinese intelligence, meeting with drug trafficker Tse Chi Lop in a Macau casino. Journalist Nury Vittachi noted that the purported video footage actually was from the 2014 action-comedy movie From Vegas to Macau, starring Chow Yun-fat. The article was subsequently retracted by Cooper.
