= Peter German (academic) =

Anti-money laundering expert

Peter German KC

Former Deputy Commissioner of the RCMP

Personal details
- Born: Vancouver, British Columbia, Canada
- Education: University of London (PhD)
- Occupation: Consultant

Peter German KC is a Canadian legal academic and anti-money laundering expert. He is best known as the author of the Dirty Money reports, as well as serving as the former deputy commissioner for western and northern Canada of the Royal Canadian Mounted Police.

== Personal life ==
German was born in 1952 in Vancouver, British Columbia, and currently lives in the city where he operates an anti-money laundering consultancy. He completed his PhD in law at the University of London in 2010.

== Career ==
German served in various law enforcement and intelligence roles and runs a private legal consultancy.

=== Law Enforcement ===
German previously served as the RCMP commander for the Lower Mainland from 2007 to 2011. He subsequently served as the RCMP deputy commissioner for western and northern Canada, and as the deputy commissioner of the Correctional Service of Canada.

=== Academia ===
German is the author of Proceeds of Crime and Money Laundering, considered the “leading anti-money laundering law” textbook in Canada.

=== Peter German & Associates ===
German operates a private consultancy that provides legal expertise in organized crime and money laundering. The firm was notably contracted by the Government of British Columbia to assess the extent if money laundering in Canada. The firm produced the Dirty Money reports for the province, resulting in the Cullen Commission.

== Dirty Money Reports ==
German’s Dirty Money reports linked Canada’s extensive money laundering problem to global crime networks, and argued Canada had become a world-class destination for transnational crime. The report resulted in the Cullen Commission.
