= Dirty Money (report) =

- Created: March 31, 2018
- Location: Canada
- Commissioned by: Government of British Columbia
- Author: Peter German
- Subject: Money Laundering
- Purpose: Investigation Into Money Laundering In Canada

Dirty Money is a formerly confidential report commissioned by the Government of British Columbia into the state of money laundering in the province. It was released to the public in two parts in 2018 and 2019, respectively.

== Dirty Money I ==
The first Dirty Money report (officially: Dirty Money: An Independent Review of Money Laundering in Lower Mainland Casinos conducted for the Attorney General of British Columbia) was released in 2018. The report specifically focused on money laundering in the province’s casinos, and alleges the funds were often the proceeds of illicit fentanyl sales.

The report provides evidence showing officials were warned about the problem as early as 2011, but failed to take action. At least $100 million in funds were unwittingly washed through major casinos in the province. In the year immediately after the report, casinos adopted more strict protocols and observed a 30% decline in gambling revenues. This potentially implies the number is significantly higher.

The report was one of the first to reveal what anti-money laundering experts coined the “Vancouver Model.” The method involves combining opioid sales, loan sharking, and money laundering through casinos and housing.

== Dirty Money II ==
In 2019, Dirty Money II (officially: Dirty Money – Part 2: Turning the Tide – An Independent Review of Money Laundering in B.C. Real Estate, Luxury Vehicle Sales & Horse Racing) was released. The second part focused on how the funds ended up in everyday consumer goods, such as real estate and luxury vehicles.

The report estimates the annual amount of money laundering in the province to be $7 billion. It also reveals real estate and luxury vehicle purchases are frequently used to launder money in the province.

== History ==
In 2017, then BC Attorney General David Eby hired former RCMP deputy commissioner Peter German to conduct an independent investigation into money laundering rumors. This follows reports of rapidly rising home prices and increased brazenness of organized crime in Vancouver.
