= Transparency International Canada =

Canadian not-for-profit corporation

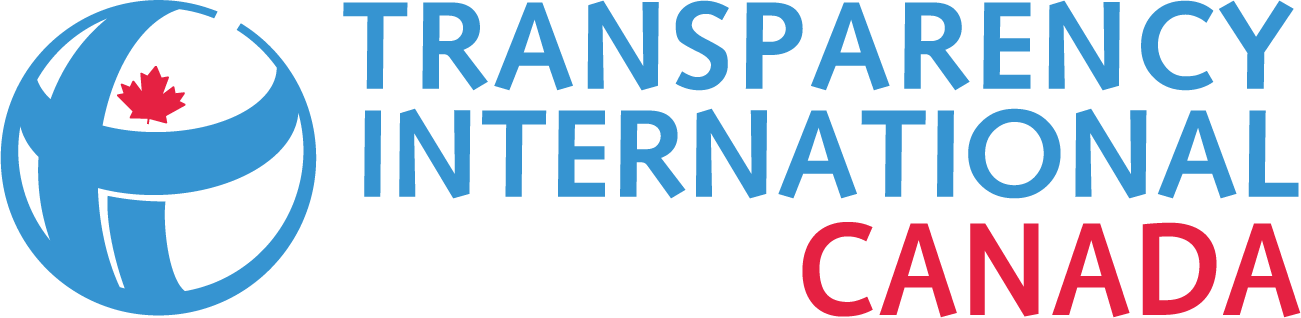
- Formation: 1996
- Type: Not-for-profit corporation with charitable status
- Legal status: Active
- Purpose: Combatting corruption and promoting transparency, accountability, and integrity in Canadian business, civil society, and government.
- Headquarters: Toronto, Ontario, Canada
- Official language: English, French
- Executive Director: Salvator Cusimano
- Chair & President: Susan Côté-Freeman
- Main organ: Board of Directors
- Affiliations: Transparency International
- Website: www.transparencycanada.ca

Transparency International Canada (TI Canada) is the Canadian chapter of Transparency International, the world's leading non-governmental organization devoted to combatting corruption. Although accredited and financially supported by Transparency International, TI Canada operates as an independent organization with its own governance structure. Branding itself as "Canadians leading the anti-corruption movement," TI Canada plays a pivotal role in advocating for transparency, accountability, and integrity across government, business, and civil society.

== Background ==
Established in 1996, TI Canada is committed to promoting transparency, accountability, and integrity in government, businesses, and civil society throughout Canada, and bringing Canadian leadership to the global anti-corruption movement.

Transparency International Canada claims that lack of ownership disclosure makes Canada's real estate market attractive for the investment the proceeds of crime, and that the lack of disclosure in property ownership facilitate tax evasion. It claims this is a growing problem gone mostly unpunished in Canada.

=== Mission and vision ===
TI Canada's mission is to foster a culture of integrity in all sectors of Canadian society. The organization's vision is a transparent, participatory, and fair Canada where corruption no longer exists.

== Areas of focus, key issues, and findings ==
The Strategic Plan of TI Canada (2024–2030) focuses on four pillars:

- Stop the flow of dirty money
- Drive integrity in business
- Protect the public's resources
- Build political integrity

=== Public sector integrity ===
Advocating for stronger anti-corruption policies and practices within all levels of government.

=== Private sector integrity ===
Promoting corporate transparency and responsible business practices to prevent corruption.

=== Beneficial ownership transparency ===
Pushing for legislation that requires the disclosure of the true owners of companies and trusts, to prevent the use of anonymous entities for money laundering and tax evasion. TI Canada is part of the End Snow Washing Coalition to advocate for strong transparency measures to prevent money laundering through real estate and other sectors in Canada.

=== Greenbelt scandal ===
In 2023, the Ontario government faced significant controversy over its decision to remove certain lands from the protected Greenbelt area, a move widely criticized for lacking transparency and accountability. TI Canada was vocal in its opposition to the decision, raising concerns about the opaque process used to determine which lands would be removed. The Government of Ontario eventually canceled its plans, with Premier Doug Ford stating, "it was a mistake."

=== Real estate ===
In its 2017 report, "No Reason to Hide: Unmasking the Anonymous Owners of Canadian Companies and Trusts," TI Canada highlighted significant gaps in transparency regarding property ownership in Vancouver. The report found that nearly half of the city's most valuable properties were owned through anonymous entities, making it difficult to track the true owners. TI Canada called for mandatory public registries to disclose beneficial ownership to curb the use of real estate for money laundering. The report suggested that lawyers are often used to launder money in Canada and that almost half of Vancouver's 100 most expensive homes were bought using methods that obscure the identity of the buyer. Research by TIC showed that between 29 and half of the 100 most valuable residential properties in the Greater Vancouver area are owned using methods that obscure the identity of the buyer, and that four are registered in offshore jurisdictions. TIC recommends that the Canadian federal government should require all companies and trusts in the country to identify their beneficial owners, and publish the collected information in a registry that is accessible to the public.

=== Corruption Perceptions Index ===
Canada ranked consistently in the top ten least corrupt countries globally, according to the Transparency International Corruption Perceptions Index until recent years. In 2024, Canada was ranked 12th globally.

=== OECD Anti-Bribery Convention ===
In September 2018, Transparency International downgraded Canada to "limited" enforcement of its obligations under the OECD Anti-Bribery Convention. It was previously ranked as "moderate". This new lower ranking places Canada in the same category as "Hungary, Greece and Argentina" and "two levels out of four below international leaders such as the United States and the U.K."

== See also ==
- Money laundering in Canada
- Public Services and Procurement Canada
