= Canadian Immigrant Investor Program =

Canadian government initiative

The Federal Immigrant Investor Program (French: Programme d'immigration des investisseurs) was an initiative of the federal government of Canada lasting from 1986 to 2014 that promoted immigration from people investing in Canada. Under the program, successful applicants and their families received permanent and unconditional Canadian residential visas and were then eligible to obtain Canadian citizenship.

== Overview ==
The Canadian Immigrant Investor Program was one of the most popular immigration investor programs (IIP) in the world, but its requirements were not changed since its inception and it had become one of the least expensive ones. As of June 26, 2010, the qualification requirements were doubled and the program was briefly suspended while the new changes came into effect. The new updated program was reopened on December 1, 2010.

At the time of termination, qualified investors needed to have at least two years of business management experience; have a legally obtained minimum net worth of CAD$1,600,000 (equivalent to $2 million in 2025); alone or with their accompanying spouse, make an investment of CAD$800,000 (equivalent to $1 million in 2025); and meet certain health and security requirements. The closest alternative to the Canadian Immigrant Investor Program would now be immigrating through the Owner-Operator Labour Market Impact Assessment (LMIA) pathway, which is a 2 staged process.

With the passing of Economic Action Plan 2014 Act (Bill C-31) on June 19, 2014, the program was terminated and undecided applications were cancelled.
