= Money laundering in Canada =

Money laundering in Canada is a problem described by professionals in 2019 as a "national crisis," and which has attracted international attention. As of July 2022, a public inquiry is currently being held to gauge the extent of the problem.

== Economic impact ==
Canadian intelligence estimates that between $45 and $113 billion of funds are laundered annually.

=== Housing ===
Canadian housing is a frequently used tool for money laundering that often involves organized crime, according to Criminal Intelligence Service Canada, one of the country's intelligence agencies. Canada is uniquely targeted due to a lack of beneficial ownership, meaning the true owner of property is never collected by authorities.

=== Luxury vehicles ===
Canada's lack of vehicle purchasing regulations have made luxury passenger vehicles a common tool for money laundering. Luxury vehicles are purchased with illicit cash since payments are only regulated in some provinces, and then sold. The depreciation is a relatively small price to obtain clean money that can be deposited into a bank account with a clear source of funds.

== Snow washing ==
Snow washing is the process of routing illegal activity through Canada to capitalize on its reputation as a “boring” and safe place.

== The Vancouver Model ==
The Vancouver Model is the name anti-money laundering experts gave to a unique model observed in Vancouver, Canada. It involves taking illicit cash earned through crime to a casino (often a VIP room), and gambling some of the proceeds. The chips are then cashed out of the casino as clean cash. To further obfuscate the funds in a money laundering process known as layering, the funds are then used to buy assets such as real estate.
