= Optimum Publishing International =

Canadian book publisher

- Status: Active
- Founded: c. 1970
- Founder: Michael Baxendale
- Headquarters location: Toronto, Canada
- Key people: Dean Baxendale, CEO
- Nonfiction topics: Politics, geopolitics, true crime
- Official website: Official website

Optimum Publishing International is a Canadian independent publisher, specializing in human, civil and political rights, geopolitics and espionage and intelligence topics.

== History ==
Optimum Publishing International was originally founded as the publishing arm of the Montreal Star in the late 1960s. It continued to operate in the 1970s, even during the Star’s strike.

Post-strike, the book publisher was acquired by Michael Baxendale, who led the publishing house until his death in 2017. Dean Baxendale, the son of Michael who is also CEO of the China Democracy Fund, relaunched the company in 2018.

== Controversies ==
Optimum has published a number of national and international authors. Due to the subjects covered in the course of publishing, the organization has been subject to pushback.

=== Patrick Brown ===
Optimum International Publishing was named in a suit over publishing a book by Canadian politician Patrick Brown. The publisher stood by the author based on their legal vetting of first hand witnesses and evidence that the content was indeed truthful. In a sworn deposition the person who made the accusations against Vic Fedeli confirmed her allegations and that deposition remains a matter of record in the Ontario Court. The case was quickly settled after the testimony. The case resulted in no settlement but an apology from Brown. The publisher’s insurer disputed its obligations for reimbursement of legal fees for the author. The insurer lost the case in superior court and all fees were paid to Brown’s attorney’s. In March of 2022 Brown settled his suit with CTV. The network corrected the story that lead to his resignation while admitting no fault allowing anchor Lisa Laflamme to continue her career without further embarrassment. In the taped audio recording Lisa Leflamme is made aware that she wasn’t underage and had no idea why she was being interviewed by her.

=== Twitter suspension ===
In 2021, the publisher's Twitter accounts were suspended following the publisher's release of two books that alleged Chinese government connections to transnational organized crime and political influence operations in western democracies. Shortly afterwards Twitter suspended the publisher’s main Twitter accounts, as well at 5 affiliated promotional accounts including those for Optimum imprint Hidden Hand and author Sam Cooper. The National Review stated that the suspensions may have resulted from efforts by the United Front Work Department of the Chinese Communist Party to disrupt sales of the books.
