= Cullen Commission =

British Columbia money laundering inquiry

Commission of Inquiry into Money Laundering In British Columbia
- Date: February 1, 2020 – May 1, 2022
- Location: British Columbia, Canada
- Also known as: Cullen Commission
- Budget: $15,000,000
- Outcome: tbd
- Website: cullencommission.ca

The Cullen Commission (officially: Commission of Inquiry Into Money Laundering in British Columbia) is a money laundering inquiry established by the Canadian province of British Columbia. Currently all evidence has been presented, and the Commission was given an extension until May 20, 2022, to deliver its findings. The findings were delivered to the BC attorney general on June 2, 2022, and require a review from the Attorney general of British Columbia before they can be released. The findings were expected to be released on June 15, 2022.

== Mandate and hearings ==
The commission is mandated with examining whether systemic regulatory failures allowed money laundering to take root in BC casinos and real estate. The commission collected testimony of 200 witnesses, including former Premier Christy Clark and former gaming minister Rich Coleman, in an investigation that took place over more than 130 days. As of 2021, closing arguments are underway. The final report is expected to be submitted to the provincial government later this year. The money laundering situation in British Columbia has been dubbed the "Vancouver Model" by an Australian professor.

== Background ==
In May 2019, the provincial government appointed Austin Cullen, a Supreme Court of British Columbia justice, to lead the inquiry following three reports stating that hundreds of millions of dollars in illegal cash affected the province's luxury vehicle, gaming, and real estate industries. It was also reported that it was at least partially responsible for the province's opioid epidemic. The inquiry was originally scheduled to conclude in May 2021, but the COVID-19 pandemic and 2020 British Columbia general election caused delays; the report was delivered on June 2, 2022.

== Inquiry details ==
The inquiry found that the "Vancouver Model" connected British Columbia, Las Vegas, and Macau casinos. Funds would come into Vancouver from transnational Chinese and Asian crime syndicates via Chinese underground banks. This influx was only stemmed when new regulations came into effect in 2015, according to former Royal Canadian Mounted Police deputy commissioner Peter German.

German had been hired by the province to investigate the state of money laundering in the province. His findings were published in the two-part Dirty Money reports. One key finding from the reports is an estimate that over 5 billion dollars—about 5 percent of all transactions—was laundered in the Vancouver real estate market.

The initial budget for the inquiry was set at $15 million. Since the commission was launched in May 2019, the inquiry held 133 days of evidence hearings; called 199 witnesses (an additional 23 witnesses appeared by sworn affidavit); held five community meetings across BC; conducted thousands of hours of independent investigation involving research and interviews; and delivered the final report within budget, despite delays.

The report was delivered on June 2, 2022, and the findings are expected to be released on June 15, 2022. The findings are expected to shape the pursuit of Federal direction on tackling money laundering In Canada.

== Testimony ==
According to testimony by the former head of the British Columbia Lottery Corporation Anti-Money Laundering Investigations and Intelligence Division, he was instructed that it was not his job to investigate suspicious transactions. It was common practice for individuals involved with the illicit proceeds of organized crime in Vancouver to bring in hundreds of thousands of dollars in $20 bills, convert them to casino chips, and then withdraw the funds in higher denominations; this process is referred to by investigators as "refining". According to a former senior investigator with the BC Lottery Corporation, he was convinced that the influx of illicit funds had been going on since at least 2009. He cited a rise in the allowed maximum bet per hand amplified the problem by inviting a criminal element. The former executive director of the Gaming Policy Branch, Larry Vander Graaf, testified that he believed putting restrictions on cash buy-ins at casinos as early as 2009 could have mitigated the issue by deterring money launderers; Graaf's calls for these restrictions were ignored.

The first interim report of the commission, issued in December 2020, reported that the Government of Canada obstructed the commission lawyers' attempts to access important records and that any records that were provided "have been redacted to the point that they provide no meaningful information." In response to this, the Attorney General of British Columbia David Eby stated that he was "incredibly concerned" about the reported reluctance to cooperate with the probe. Cullen also wrote in the report that the commission was also forbidden from interviewing federal prosecutors involved with the Financial Transactions and Reports Analysis Centre of Canada. The report also found that the CEO of the BC Lottery Corporation ignored federal anti-money laundering direction in favour of allowing these transactions as they were large revenue generators.

== Findings ==
The report concluded Canada failed to stop the flow of tens of billions in laundered cash per year.

The inquiry made several findings, with the most important being the province should create its own anti-money laundering task force. This suggestion builds on another key finding, suggesting Canada’s federal anti-money laundering resources are unreliable.

== Criticism ==
The final report delivered was heavily criticized by whistleblowers, who said that they received little support for coming forward. BC Attorney General David Eby agreed, suggesting he would be pursuing ways to strengthen whistleblower protections in the future.
