= Paragon Gaming =

Gaming company based in Enterprise, Nevada, US

- Company type: Private
- Industry: Gaming and hospitality
- Founded: 2000
- Founders: Diana L. Bennett; Scott Menke
- Headquarters: Las Vegas, Nevada, United States
- Key people: Diana L. Bennett (Chairman); Scott Menke (Chief Executive Officer)
- Products: Casino and resort properties
- Services: Casino management; development; consulting
- Website: www.paragongaming.com

Paragon Gaming is a gaming company based in Enterprise, Nevada that owns and manages casinos in the United States and formerly in Canada.

== History ==
Paragon Gaming was founded in 2000 by cousins Diana Bennett and Scott Menke, who were experienced gaming executives and the daughter and nephew, respectively, of prominent casino owner William Bennett. The company began working with American Indian tribes, seeking opportunities to develop tribal casinos.

In 2001, Paragon proposed to develop a casino at the Channel Islands Harbor in Oxnard, California on behalf of a yet-to-be-determined tribe. In the face of opposition from local officials, the company withdrew the proposal and announced a new plan to build a casino at the Oxnard Factory Outlet with the Greenville Rancheria of Maidu Indians. This plan, too, provoked strong opposition, and was rejected by the city council.

Later in 2001, Paragon announced a deal to develop a casino near Palm Springs, California for the Augustine Band of Cahuilla Mission Indians. The project drew some attention because the tribe had only one adult member; critics questioned the seemliness of developers profiting from a casino that would benefit so few Indians. The Augustine Casino opened in 2002 at a cost of $16 million.

Meanwhile, the company worked with First Nations bands in Alberta to lobby for regulations that would allow tribes to open casinos. When those efforts succeeded in 2002, Paragon partnered with the Enoch Cree Nation to develop a casino hotel in Edmonton. The $178-million River Cree Resort and Casino opened in October 2006. Paragon operated and co-owned the casino until 2014, when the Enoch Cree bought out the company's interests.

In September 2006, the company purchased the bankrupt Edgewater Casino, located at the Plaza of Nations in Vancouver, for $43 million.

In 2008, Paragon opened the Eagle River Casino and Travel Plaza at the Alexis Whitecourt Indian Reserve in northern Alberta. Paragon owned a 40 percent share of the property, with the Alexis First Nation owning the rest. The casino's revenues fell short of expectations, and it went into bankruptcy by 2014; Paragon was left with no stake in it.

In 2013, Paragon assumed management of the struggling Riviera hotel and casino on the Las Vegas Strip on behalf of Starwood Capital. The Riviera closed in May 2015. Later that month, Paragon took over management of the nearby Westgate Las Vegas under a lease from Westgate Resorts. The company transferred many of its employees and bookings from the Riviera to the Westgate.

In 2014, Paragon began construction of the Parq Vancouver, a $600-million hotel and casino complex at the BC Place stadium. The Parq opened in 2017, and the Edgewater Casino, which it replaced, closed on the same day. In 2019, Paragon sold its stake in the Parq to one of the property's other co-owners.

The company added two more Nevada casinos to its portfolio in 2016, assuming management of the Hooters Casino Hotel near the Las Vegas Strip and acquiring a majority stake in the Hard Rock Hotel & Casino Lake Tahoe.

Paragon's management contract at the Westgate ended in 2020.

In 2023, Paragon sold the Hard Rock in Lake Tahoe to Fertitta Entertainment.

== Properties ==
The properties owned or managed by Paragon are:

- The Den Las Vegas – Spring Valley, Nevada
- Oyo Hotel & Casino – Paradise, Nevada

=== Former properties ===
- Augustine Casino – Coachella, California
- Eagle River Casino and Travel Plaza – Alexis Whitecourt Indian Reserve, Alberta
- Edgewater Casino – Vancouver, British Columbia
- Hard Rock Hotel & Casino Lake Tahoe – Stateline, Nevada
- Parq Vancouver – Vancouver, British Columbia
- River Cree Resort and Casino – Enoch, Alberta
- Riviera – Winchester, Nevada
- Westgate Las Vegas – Winchester, Nevada
