= Portobello West =

Seasonal market in Vancouver, British Columbia

Coordinates: 49.2717°N 123.1053°W

Portobello West is a seasonal market held in Vancouver, British Columbia. The market was founded in 2006 and features products from various local designers and artisans. It currently takes place at Creekside Community Centre in the Olympic Village neighbourhood of False Creek.

== History ==
Portobello West was founded in August 2006 by Carlie Smith who, after living in London for two years, wanted to bring the European-style market atmosphere to Vancouver. The market's name is a reference to the Portobello Road Market in London. Smith envisioned a regular event to showcase local designers and artisans. The inaugural market, held at the Plaza of Nations, was attended by some 3,000 shoppers and had 92 vendors selling local fashion and art products.

In November 2006, following the closure of the Plaza of Nations, the market relocated to the Rocky Mountaineer Station. The sudden change in location, along with a snowfall on the day of the market, caused low attendance for the 2006 market. Portobello hosted its first holiday market on December 10, 2006.

Portobello West has only ever had one January Market and one February Market, both in 2007. After consultation with local artists and designers and the general public, the January and February Markets were determined to be unpopular, predominantly as a result of the consistently inclement weather in the region during those months.

In 2008, the Market introduced a two-day season opener on the last weekend of March and a two-day Holiday Season Market on the second weekend of December, with both events drawing nearly 3,000 shoppers across both days.

In 2009, Portobello added another two-day market at the end of November, expanding the holiday season markets to four days total. The same year, Smith launched a market in Toronto, Ontario, called Portobello East.

The 2024 Spring Market took place from April 6 to 7, featuring over 65 vendors at the Roundhouse Community Centre in Yaletown.
