= Oyo Hotel & Casino =

Casino hotel in Las Vegas, Nevada

Coordinates: 36°5′59″N 115°10′3″W

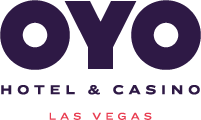

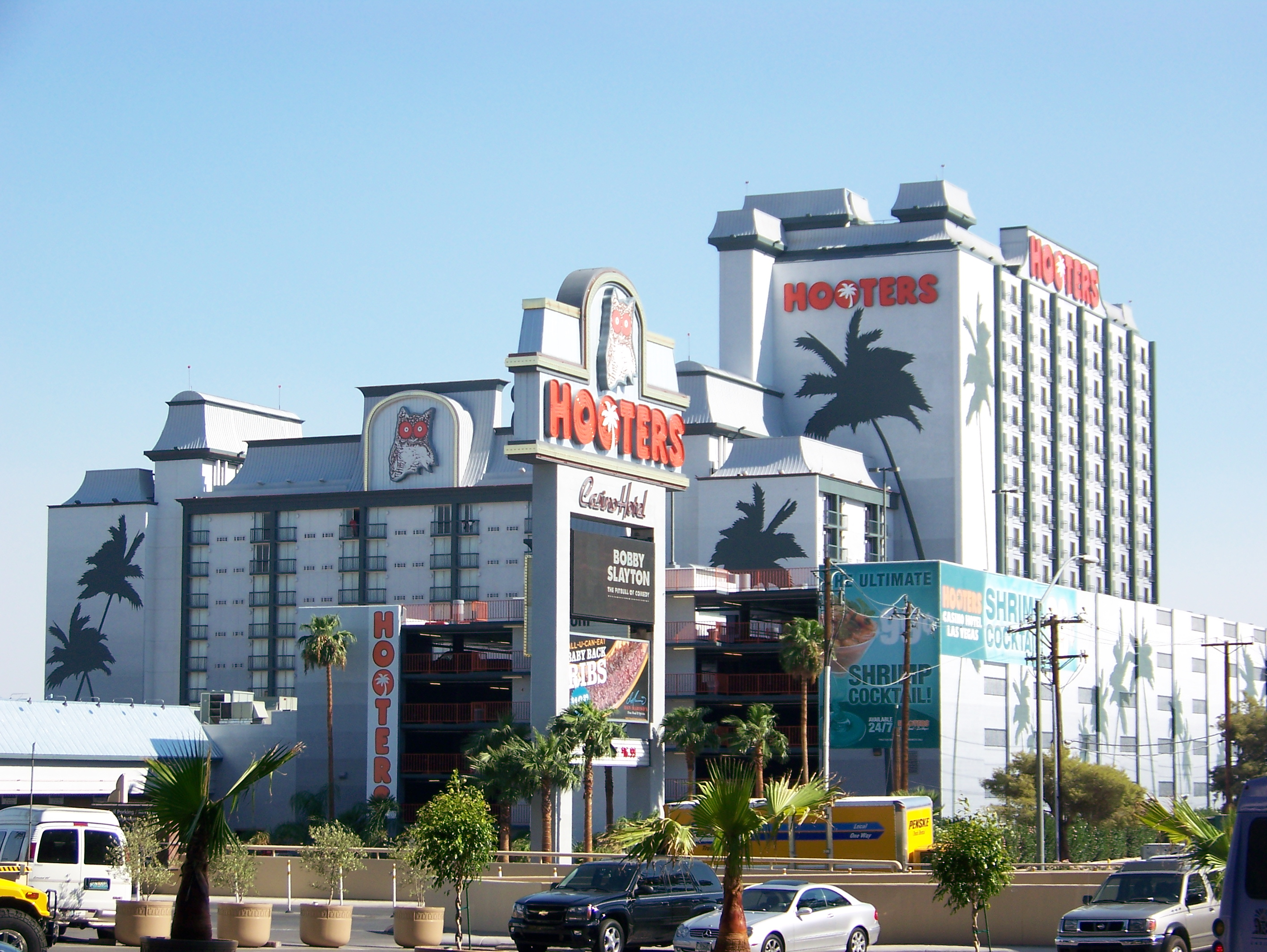
- The Hooters-era property in 2007
- Interactive map of Oyo Hotel & Casino
- Location: Paradise, Nevada, U.S.; 115 East Tropicana Avenue
- Opened: July 26, 1973; 53 years ago
- No. of rooms: 696
- Gaming space: 30,000 ft^{2} (2,800 m^{2})
- Permanent shows: Cons of Comedy; Gordie Brown; The Hilarious 7
- Notable restaurants: Hooters; Steak 'n Shake
- Casino type: Land-based
- Owner: Highgate & Oyo Hotels & Homes
- Operating license holder: Paragon Gaming
- Previous names: Howard Johnson Hotel (1973–1975); Paradise (1975-1976); 20th Century (1977-1978); Treasury (1978–1985); Pacifica (1985); Polynesian (1985–1989); Hôtel San Rémo (1989–2006); Hooters Casino Hotel (2006–2019)
- Renovated in: 1975-1976, 1977, 1989, 2006, 2012, 2017, 2019
- Website: oyolasvegas.com

Oyo Hotel & Casino (Note: Stylized as "OYO".) is a casino hotel near the Las Vegas Strip in Paradise, Nevada, United States. It is owned by Highgate and Oyo Hotels & Homes, and its casino is operated by Paragon Gaming. It is located east of the Strip and next to the former site of the Tropicana resort. The hotel has 696 rooms with a 30,000-square-foot (2,800 m^{2}) casino.

The property originally opened on July 26, 1973, as a Howard Johnson's hotel. Since then, it has changed ownership and names several times, most recently operating as the Hotel San Remo (Note: Stylized as Hôtel San Rémo.) (1989–2006) and the Hooters Casino Hotel (2006–2019), the latter in partnership with the Hooters restaurant chain. The hotel includes the original 10-story tower and an 18-story addition added in 1991.

== History ==
=== Howard Johnson Hotel (1973–1975) ===
The hotel was originally a Howard Johnson's Motor Lodge. Construction began in September 1972. It was developed at a cost of $8 million by a group of local businesspersons led by Paul Oesterle. It was built along Tropicana Avenue, just east of the Las Vegas Strip and adjacent to the Tropicana resort. The Howard Johnson Hotel opened on July 26, 1973. A gaming license was issued for the property later that year, allowing the operation of 150 slot machines.

The hotel included 332 rooms, spread across a 10-story tower and two-story suites. By 1974, Oesterle had plans to expand the hotel by adding three additional 10-story towers with 544 new rooms. However, his company Oesterle Nevada soon declared bankruptcy as it was unable to pay its debts. Eureka Federal Savings and Loan, holder of the hotel's mortgage, foreclosed on the property and bought it at auction for $7.7 million in March 1975.

=== Ownership changes and renamings (1975–1989) ===
In September 1975, Eureka sold the Howard Johnson's to Bernard Nemerov, a former part owner of the Riviera casino, for $10 million. Nemerov renamed it as the Paradise Hotel. He reopened the property's casino on New Year's Day 1976. Five months later, the Paradise was targeted in a credit scam by 54 mobsters associated with the Philadelphia crime family. The scheme left the casino with insufficient cash to operate, and it was forced to close and declare bankruptcy.

The property was purchased in 1977 by a group led by New York businessman Andrew DeLillo, who then renamed it as the 20th Century. It was later sold to Herb Pastor, owner of the Coin Castle and Golden Goose casinos in Downtown Las Vegas, who renamed the 20th Century as the Treasury Hotel. At that time, the property featured a country western theme.

Former football player Gerry Philbin purchased the Treasury in 1982 for $20 million; the casino closed at that time because Philbin had not obtained a gaming license, though the hotel continued to operate. By the end of the year, Philbin was forced to put the hotel into Chapter 11 bankruptcy protection.

In 1985, the DeLillo family regained ownership of the Treasury through foreclosure and renamed it as the Pacifica Hotel. It was announced that the Pacifica would be marketed to gay travelers, but this plan proved controversial and was soon abandoned. Later that year, the Pacifica was renamed as the Polynesian Hotel.

=== Hotel San Remo (1989–2006) ===
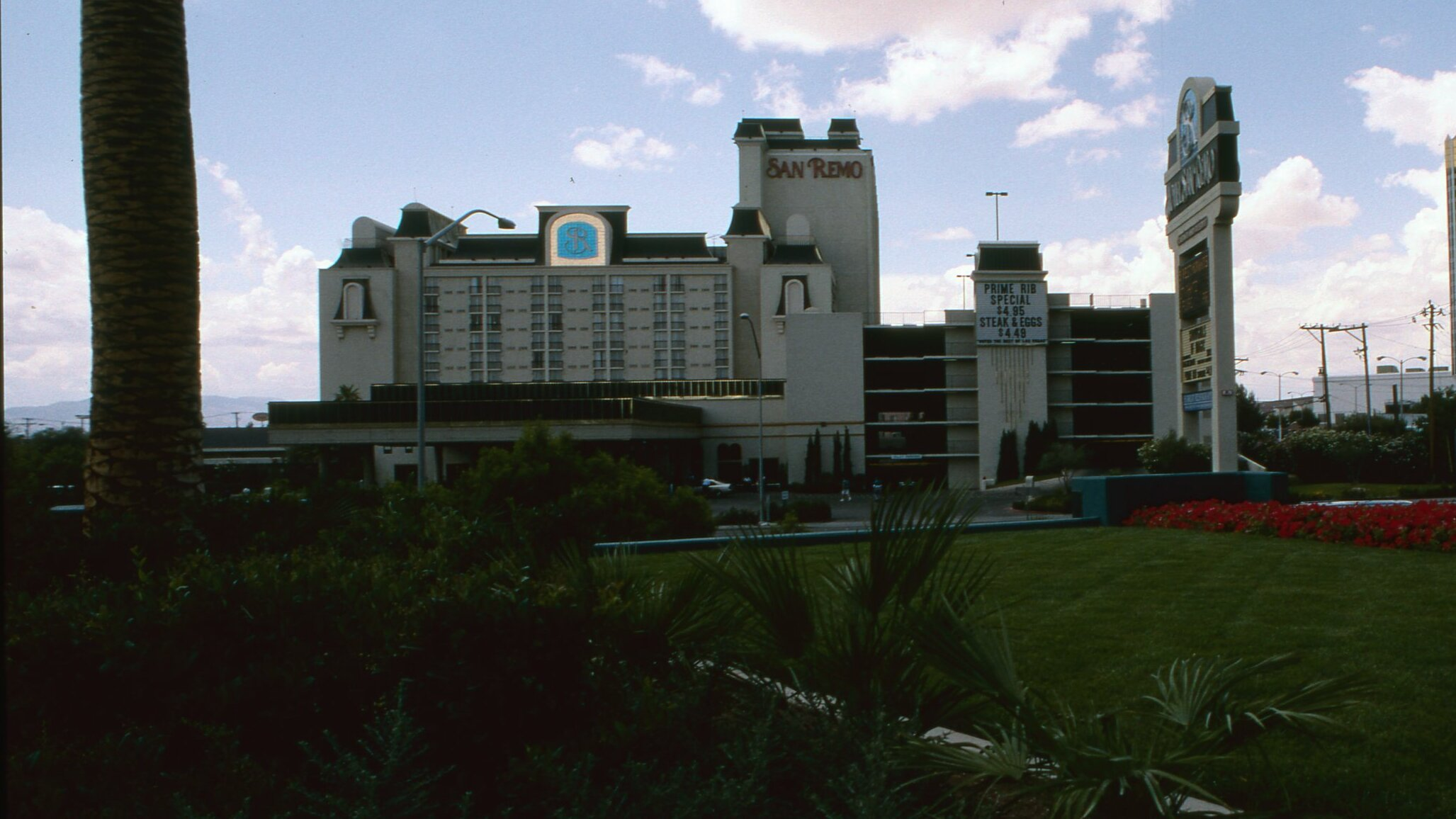
San Remo in 1996

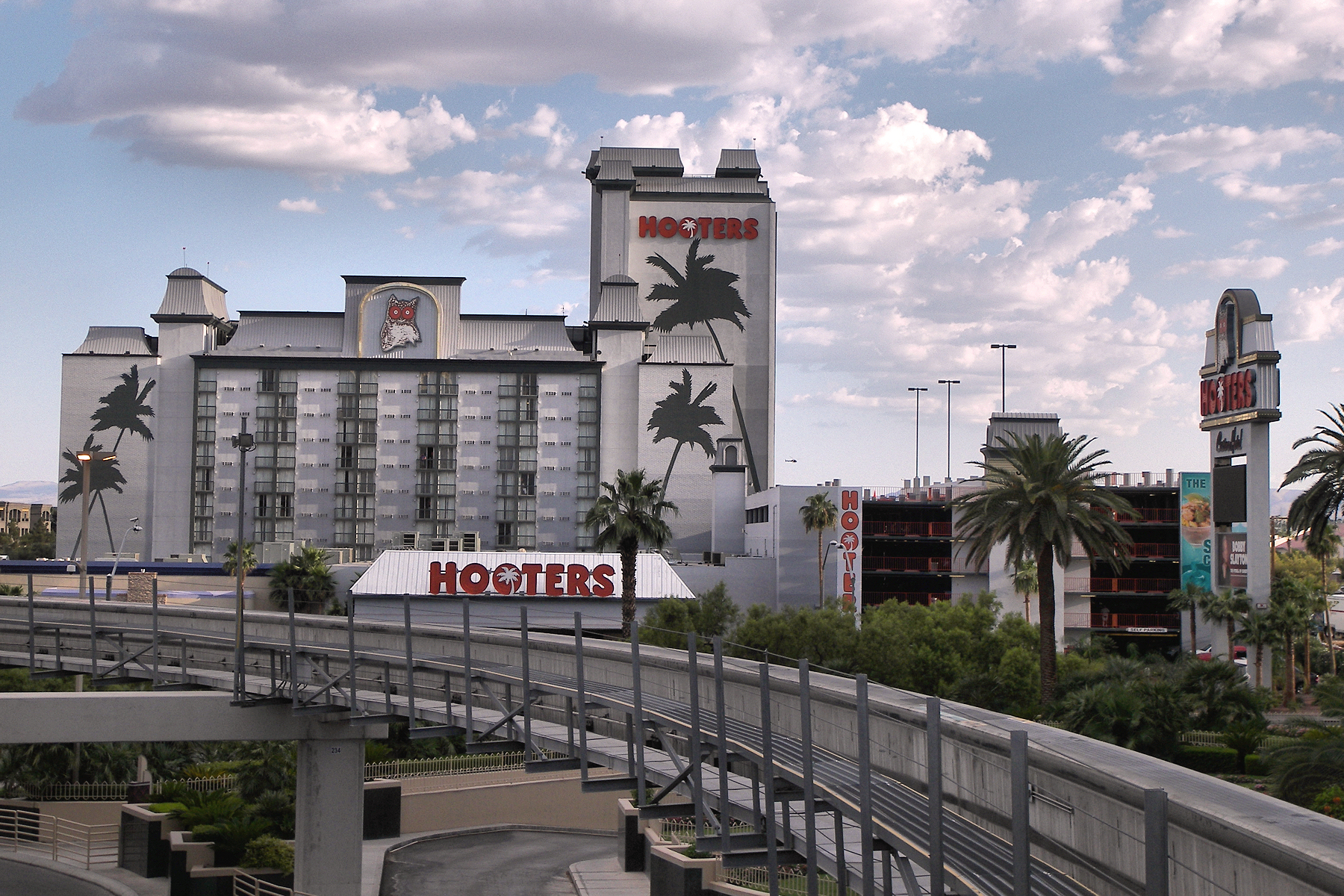
The property in 2007, following the Hooters conversion

In 1989, it was purchased by Sukeaki Izumi, a Japanese industrialist and hotelier, who renovated it with an Italian Riviera ambience and renamed it the Hotel San Remo. He paid a reported $30 million for the purchase and renovation. During its initial years, the San Remo was affiliated with the Ramada hotel chain. It became popular as a bargain property. A second hotel tower, rising 18 stories, was finished in 1991. It brought the total room count to 711, and the San Remo now employed 600 workers.

In 2004, Izumi's company, Eastern and Western Hotel Corp., began looking for opportunities to grow the hotel. The company sought to take advantage of heavy development that had occurred at the nearby Tropicana – Las Vegas Boulevard intersection since 1989. Hooters approached with a redevelopment proposal. Ultimately, a group of nine partners in Hooters of America acquired a two-thirds interest in the property, which was put under control of a joint venture, 155 East Tropicana, LLC. Plans were announced in August 2004 to redevelop the San Remo as a Hooters brand casino and hotel. Hooters of America, owner of the Hooters trademark, would receive 2% of revenue as royalties.

Of the property's many names, San Remo had the longest run. Hooters launched a nine-month, $130 million renovation in 2005, as part of the rebranding effort. The entire property was renovated, including its hotel. The room count was reduced to 696, the result of several units being converted into suites.

=== Hooters Casino Hotel (2006–2019) ===
Hooters Casino Hotel opened on February 2, 2006, the weekend of Super Bowl XL. The opening was low-key for a Las Vegas debut, with a handful of celebrities in attendance, such as TV personality Brooke Burke.

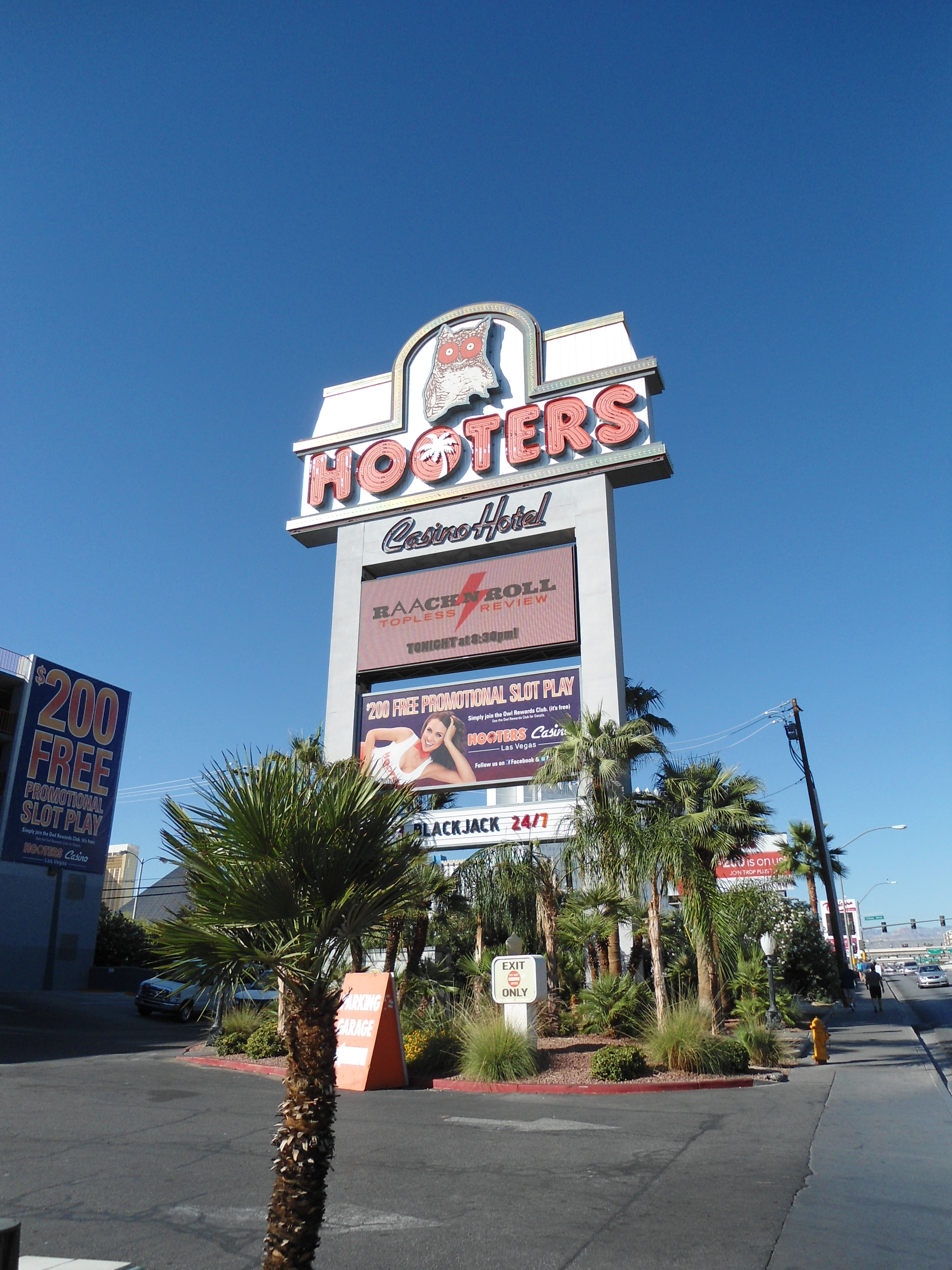
Roadside sign

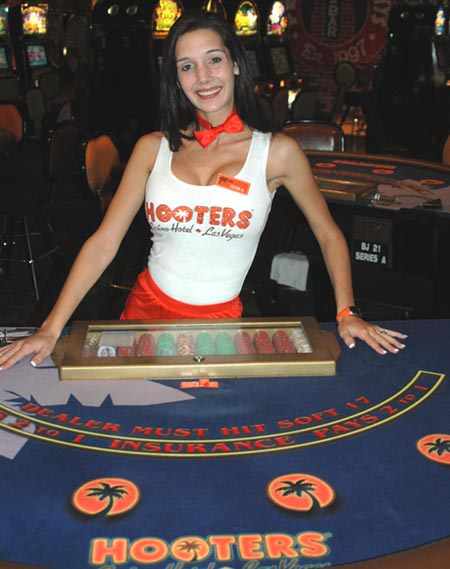
A Hooters Girl table dealer

The casino included an on-site Hooters restaurant. Former Miami Dolphins quarterback Dan Marino also opened a steak and seafood restaurant known as Dan Marino's Fine Food and Spirits. The hotel-casino employed 1,000 workers, including more than 200 of the restaurant chain's signature Hooters Girls, who worked at the property as waitresses, bartenders, cocktail servers, and casino dealers.

The hotel-casino was promoted at more than 100 Hooters restaurant locations. The property struggled in its early years, but still proved to be more profitable than the San Remo. Roughly 80 percent of its clientele was male. The Hooters brand was found to be a turn-off for female gamblers, as well as wealthy tourists and business travelers. The property also appealed to a younger demographic, whereas casinos generally relied on a middle-age clientele. To increase profits, the property added new slot machines and began marketing to an older demographic. Hooters began to turn a profit in 2007, after taking cost-cutting measures, such as staff reductions. The casino was popular for its $3 minimum blackjack, and its Hooters restaurant was the chain's most profitable location.

During 2007, 155 East Tropicana accepted an unsolicited offer from Hedwigs Las Vegas Top Tier, a joint venture of NTH Advisory Group and Silverleaf Real Estate, to buy the property for $225 million (including assumption of $130 million in debt). Hedwigs planned to redesign and rebrand the casino once again, as a "lifestyle, entertainment-driven boutique hotel". Analysts called the agreement "curious" given Hooters's poor earnings performance. The deal fell through in June 2008 when Hedwigs failed to make a required payment. Profits fell again that year, due to the Great Recession.

With revenue declining, the casino began defaulting on loan payments in April 2009. Canpartners Realty Holding Co., a subsidiary of Canyon Capital, bought up much of the company's debt at a heavy discount and planned to foreclose on the hotel. The owners, seeking to block foreclosure, filed for Chapter 11 bankruptcy in August 2011, listing only $63 million in assets against liabilities of $163 million. After a planned February 2012 auction attracted no outside bidders, the bankruptcy court approved Canpartner's $60 million credit offer for the property, with the sale expected to close around March 30. The Navegante Group was approved to manage casino operations, while Canyon Capital said it was seeking a major hotel chain to take over and rebrand the property.

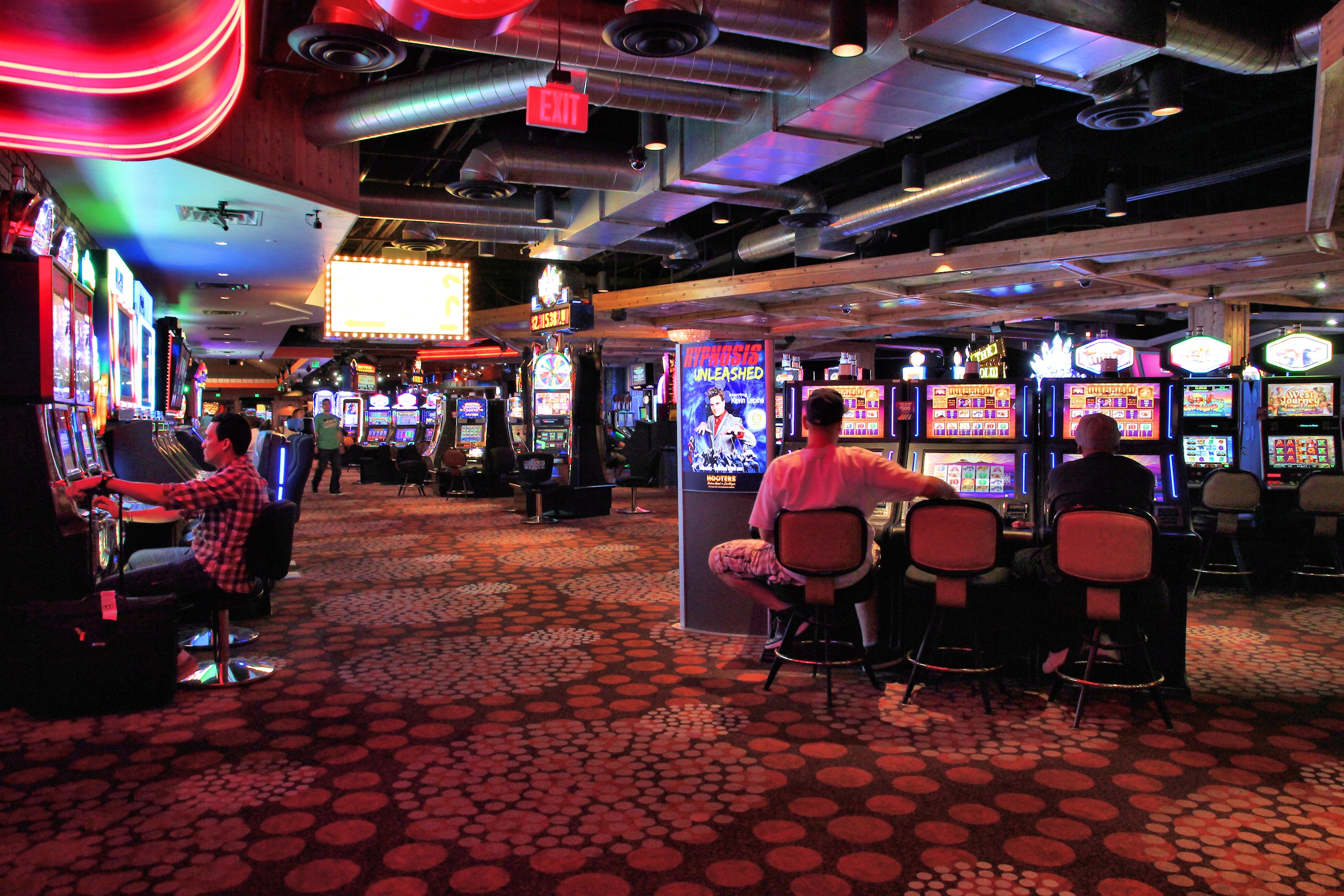
Slot machines in Hooters Casino

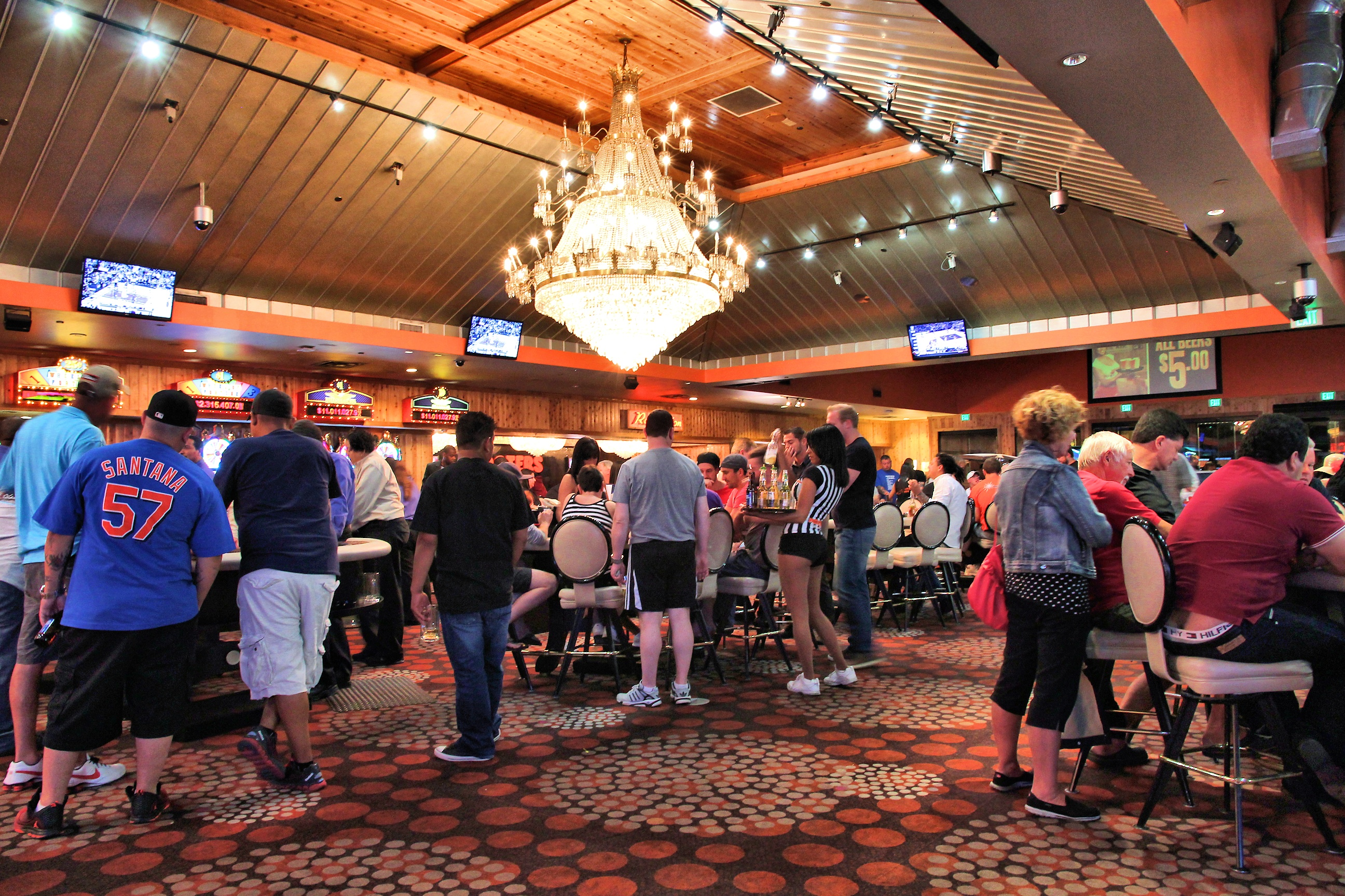
Game tables in Hooters Casino

In May 2015, Canyon Capital sold the casino to Trinity Hotel Investors, based in New York, for $70 million. At first, Trinity was expected to rename the property and place it under the management of Holiday Inn, but they later decided to retain the Hooters branding. Trinity hired Paragon Gaming to replace Navegante as the property's operator in 2016.

Joystixx, a 21-and-over video game lounge, had opened in 2011, but it saw minimal success and was replaced a year later by the Saloon, featuring live music. The Saloon was added as part of a property-wide remodel. Another renovation, costing $18 million, was underway in 2017. The project included makeovers of the casino floor and hotel rooms. The world's largest Steak 'n Shake restaurant, with seating for 200 people, opened inside the Hooters casino in 2018.

=== Oyo Hotel & Casino (2019–present) ===
In August 2019, Oyo Hotels & Homes partnered with New York-based investment and management company Highgate to purchase the property for $135 million. They announced plans to rename it as Oyo Hotel & Casino Las Vegas, while retaining the Hooters restaurant. The Oyo rebranding process began on September 16, 2019, and included restaurant upgrades as part of a $20 million renovation. The casino floor is 30,000 sq ft (2,800 m^{2}). In October 2025 and, again, in October 2026, alcohol sales were suspended at the property for 10 days. The 2025 closure was a result of a sudden severance of Oyo and third-party operator Highgate Hotels, while no official reason was immediately cited in 2026.

"Palette" and "Collection O" controversy

On August 13th and 14th, 2026, the property and its parent company (PRISM) were subject to controversy for using AI-generated or heavily edited imagery to depict two non-existent properties using their same address, "Palette Las Vegas" and "Collection O Las Vegas", brands owned by them, in order to lure customers to check in at Oyo, after finding no other choice.

== Live entertainment ==
The San Remo featured budget-priced entertainment in the 1990s. Among its offerings was Showgirls of Magic, which ran from 1996 to 2005, in the 180-seat Parisian Cabaret. The show included dancing and comedy. It was produced, directed and choreographed by Bonnie Saxe, mother of magician Melinda Saxe. In 1999, the show was renamed Les Trix, capitalizing on the Strip's opening of the Paris Las Vegas resort. By 2001, the name had been changed back to Showgirls of Magic, and the show was revamped. It initially featured a family friendly edition, followed by a topless version later in the evening; the former was eliminated in 2003, in favor of another topless performance.

Broadway Cabaret, another show in the 1990s, featured songs from various Broadway musicals. In 1999, the San Remo debuted Night Madness, a music and magic show starring Julie McCullough and Corinna Harney. Comedian Bobby Slayton performed at Hooters from 2007 to 2009. Comedian Geechy Guy created The Dirty Joke Show a year later.

Purple Reign, a tribute show to the musician Prince, opened at Hooters in 2009. Men of X, a male stripper revue, also opened that year. Raack N Roll, a show featuring topless female dancers, debuted in 2011. The three shows closed in 2012, allowing renovation work to commence on the property's performance venue.

A dinner and magic show, featuring the duo Jarrett & Raja, opened at Hooters in 2017. Other entertainment included singer Gordie Brown and the show Cons of Comedy. Cherry Boom Boom, a show featuring female dancers and rock and roll music, opened in 2019. That year, Hooters also debuted Hilarious 7, featuring a rotating lineup of seven comedians, each giving a 10-minute performance.
