= Parq Casino =

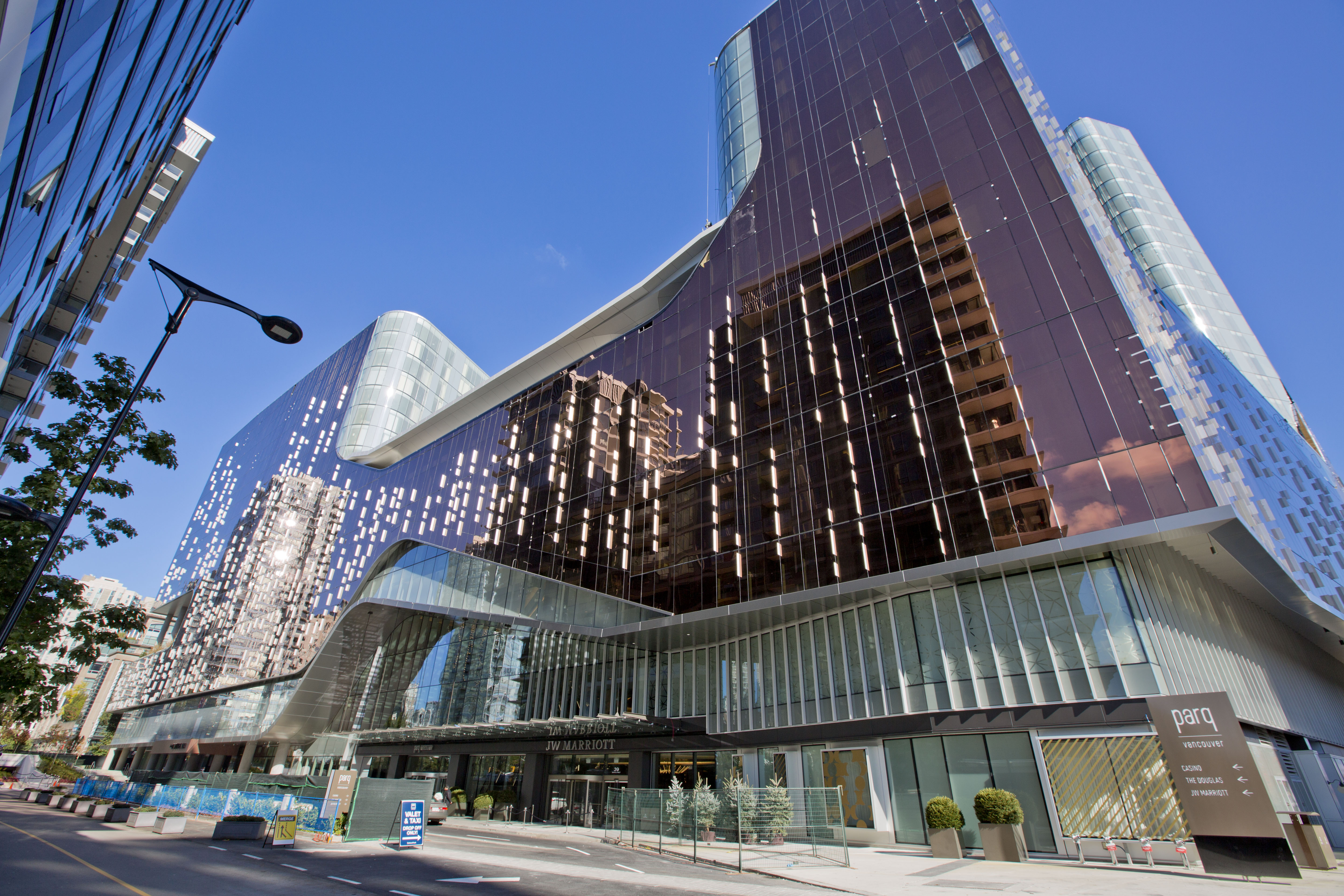
- Hotel chain: JW Marriott; Autograph Collection

General information
- Status: Completed
- Type: Casino, resort
- Location: 39 Smithe Street, Vancouver, BC V6B 0R3, Vancouver, British Columbia
- Coordinates: 49°16′30.771″N 123°6′47.136″W
- Construction started: December 2014
- Opened: September 29, 2017

Height
- Height: 83 m (272 ft) JW Marriott North Tower; 57 m (187 ft) JW Marriott South Tower; 59 m (194 ft) The Douglas

Technical details
- Size: 72,000 m^{2} (780,000 sq ft)
- Floor count: 25 (JW Marriott North Tower), 17 (JW Marriott South Tower and The Douglas)

Design and construction
- Architects: ACDF Architecture and Architecture49 (Design Architect), IBI Group Architects (Canada) Inc. (Project Architect and Architect of Record)
- Developer: New Edgewater Development
- Main contractor: EllisDon

Other information
- Number of rooms: 517
- Number of restaurants: 5
- Number of bars: 3
- Parking: 1,069 stalls

Website
- www.parqvancouver.com

Parq Casino (formerly Parq Vancouver) is a resort and casino in Downtown Vancouver, British Columbia. Located adjacent to BC Place, the resort features two Marriott International hotels (consisting of the JW Marriott Parq Vancouver and spa, and Autograph Collection hotel The Douglas) with a combined 517 rooms and suites, a 6,700 m^{2} (72,000-square-foot) casino, bars and restaurants, and 5,800 m^{2} (62,000 square feet) of event space.

Parq opened in September 2017, replacing the temporary Edgewater Casino at the Plaza of Nations; it was developed by Edgewater owner Paragon Gaming in partnership with Dundee Corporation and PBC Group, via the joint venture Parq Holdings Limited. Paragon sold its stake in the property in 2019.

== History ==
=== Development ===
In 2010, Paragon Gaming—operator of the Edgewater Casino at Enterprise Hall—proposed a $500 million expansion and re-location of the casino to a vacant site adjacent to the west end of BC Place. Paragon CEO Scott Menke had frequently visited Vancouver during the development of the River Cree Casino on Enoch Cree Nation 135, and became increasingly interested in developing a new downtown casino there after being impressed by its hosting of the 2010 Winter Olympics.

The new building was estimated to be three times larger than the interim Edgewater Casino, and feature as many as 1,500 slot machines and 150 table games (in comparison to 600 slot machines and 75 tables). The proposal was backed by the British Columbia Lottery Corporation (BCLC) and BC Place operator BC Pavilion Corporation (PavCo). On April 12, 2011, Paragon announced an agreement with Marriott International to build two luxury hotels as part of the casino.

The new casino was opposed by anti-gambling groups (including the lobbying group Vancouver Not Vegas) and former police officers, who believed that expanding casino gaming in downtown Vancouver would exacerbate gambling addiction and organized crime activity. Then-mayor Gregor Robertson was also opposed to the project, and proposed a moratorium on any further applications seeking to expand gaming in Vancouver. In April 2011, Vancouver City Council approved the future relocation of Edgewater Casino's license to the proposed property, but blocked Paragon's proposed expansion of gaming. Menke later admitted that the company did not perform enough consultation on the original proposal.

In March 2013, Paragon reached a master development agreement with PavCo for the leased land, which it promoted as "Site 10a". In September 2013, Paragon announced a revised proposal for the new casino in partnership with Dundee Corporation and 360 Vox Corporation, repositioning it as a $535 million "urban resort" with an array of hospitality amenities and event space alongside the casino. The project would be anchored by two Marriott hotels, including a JW Marriott and a "boutique" Autograph Collection hotel. While the casino would have a larger floor space, it would maintain the same number of slot machines and tables as Edgewater. Dundee CEO Ned Goodman stated that the property would be "a resort centrepiece where people can see a game, concert or show; meet, work, or stay."

Amid continued lobbying efforts, the project was a granted a preliminary development permit in December 2013; the city imposed conditions requiring Paragon to adhere to its commitment to not expand gaming, and to establish a responsible gambling framework aligned with the recommendations of Provincial Health Officer Perry Kendall (including considerations regarding the provision of ATMs and the sale of liquor in the casino space, among others). The property would also be required to meet LEED Gold environmental standards.

=== Construction ===
The project, now known as the Parq Vancouver, broke ground in December 2014. Construction was originally expected to be completed in late-2016 for an opening in early-2017. Former BCLC CEO Mike Graydon was hired to serve as president of Parq Holdings, a joint venture of Paragon, Dundee, and Ottawa-based PBC Group; the BC Comptroller General later found that Graydon was engaged in a conflict of interest with Paragon relating to Parq before he departed from the BCLC. Graydon subsequently repaid approximately $55,000 in salary, and later stepped down from Parq in 2015.

In June 2016, the opening of Parq Vancouver was delayed to fall 2017 The project went $95 million over its budget; costing an estimated $640 million in total, it became British Columbia's largest privately-funded development.

=== Opening ===
Parq Vancouver officially opened on September 29, 2017, at 11 p.m. PT, with its restaurants opening over the days that followed, and the hotels having already soft opened. The casino's grand opening attracted a large number of visitors, many of whom having come from a Coldplay concert at BC Place; within half an hour, the fire department ordered the closure of its Beatty Street entrance due to capacity limits. All employees from the Edgewater were transferred to Parq.

In November 2018, rapper Drake accused the Parq of racial profiling and prohibiting him from entering the casino. Parq Holdings issued an apology stating that the company "categorically stand[s] against racism of any kind", and were improving its communications regarding "new regulations" (alluding to BC anti-money laundering rules adopted in 2017, which require a source-of-funds declaration for patrons gambling with more than $10,000) to ensure they were "better understood by all guests".

In February 2019, Paragon sold its stake in Parq Holdings to PBC Group. The property was reported to have taken multiple unsecured loans in 2018 to cover debt, after having lost $158 million in 2018 due to the impact of the BC money laundering regulations. In May 2019, Parq Holdings restructured nearly $580 million in debt after receiving an investment from a new equity partner. In November 2019, it was announced that Joe Brunini had resigned as CEO of Parq Holdings, and that he would be succeeded by Peter Goudron, former executive director of the BC Gaming Industry Association.

In March 2020, the Parq Vancouver casino and its restaurants were closed due to the COVID-19 pandemic. By October 2020, Parq estimated that it had lost at least $1 billion in potential revenue from cancelled corporate events, although the JW Marriot did continue to host smaller gatherings and hybrid events. The casino reopened on July 1, 2021 in compliance with public health orders. The resort also opened two new "VIP" gaming salons, Koi and Luna.

In December 2024, the property was rebranded from "Parq Vancouver" to "Parq Casino", as part of a new marketing campaign targeting casino players as its core customer base, rather than entertainment and "casual" visitors coming from events at BC Place and Rogers Arena.

In February 2026, after it eased a moratorium on gaming expansion, the city of Vancouver approved a permit request by Parq Casino to install 300 additional slot machines, expanding it from 600 to 900 machines.

== Features and design ==
Paragon CEO Scott Menke explained that Parq was intended to preserve the "integrity" of Vancouver's "unique local culture", and "show off Vancouver in its finest form" rather than "keep everyone in a box" like a Las Vegas resort; he argued that "Vancouver Not Vegas" was actually an appropriate mantra. Its architecture is designed to evoke Vancouver's mountainous, coastal terrain, while its main façade features copper-coloured glass and an array of shimmering metallic "fins" arranged to look like a mountain range.

The property contains 517 rooms and suites across two hotels, the JW Marriott Parq Vancouver and The Douglas (named after the Douglas fir tree common to BC and the Pacific coast). It would initially feature eight restaurants and lounges led by Blau + Associates, including a Vancouver location of Honey Salt, the steak and seafood restaurant The Victor, the Chinese restaurant 1886 (named after the year that Chinatown, Vancouver was established), the bar and eatery D/6, and the Lotus Whiskey and Tea Lounge among others. The JW Marriott hotel includes a spa.

A 2,800 m^{2} (30,000-square-foot) rooftop terrace is situated on its sixth floor, which has views of BC Place and serves as a patio space for D/6 and The Victor. The property includes 5,800 square metres (62,000 sq ft) of event space, including a 1,449.7 m^{2} (15,604-square-foot) grand ballroom promoted as being the largest of its kind in Western Canada.

The casino occupies two floors and features 6,700 m^{2} (72,000 square feet) of gaming space, including 75 table games, up to 900 slot machines, a poker room, and VIP areas. In 2025, BCLC opened one of its first ProLine Sportsbook Lounge locations at Parq Casino.

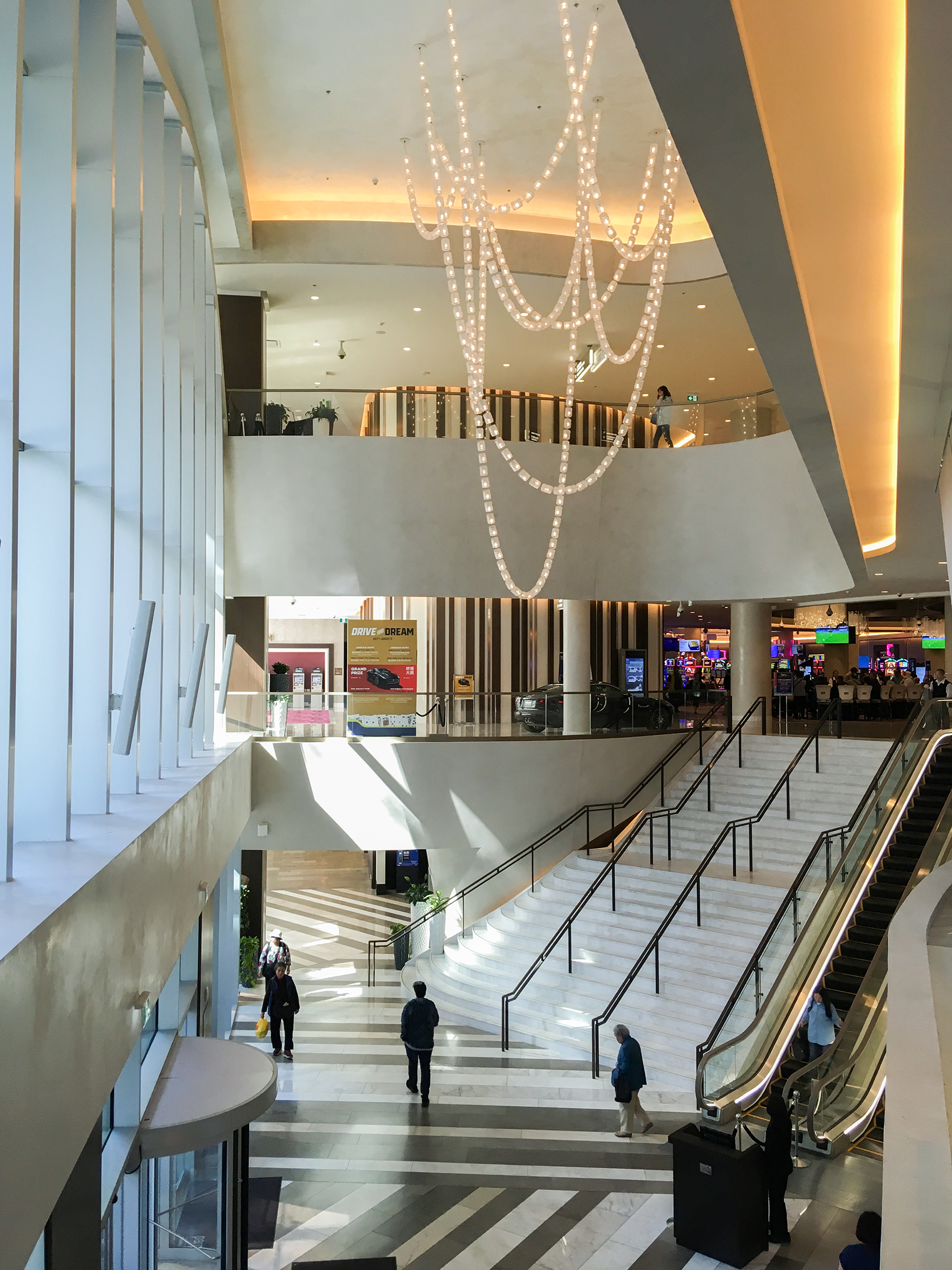
Entrance lobby

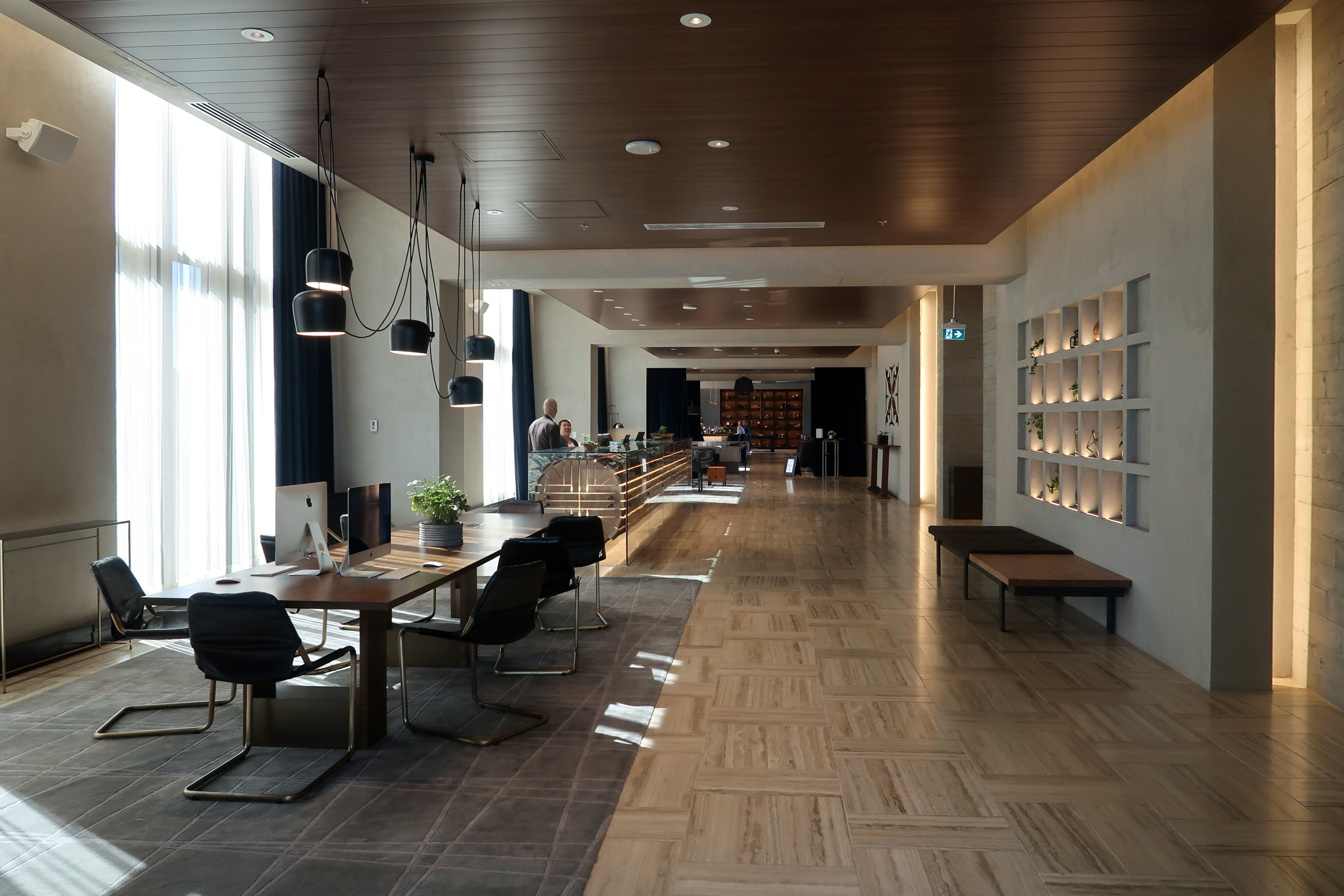
The Douglas level 6 lobby

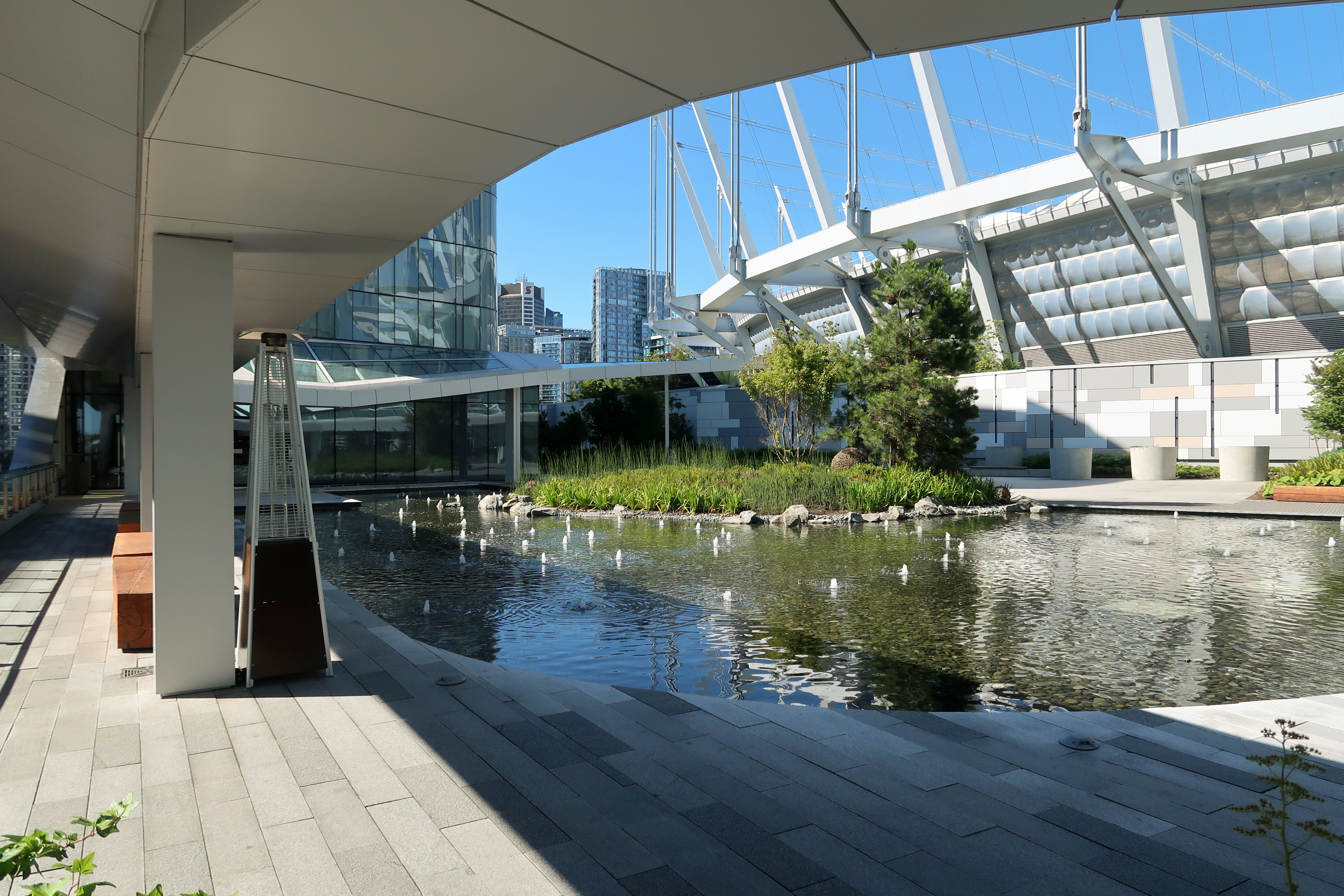
The Park on level 6

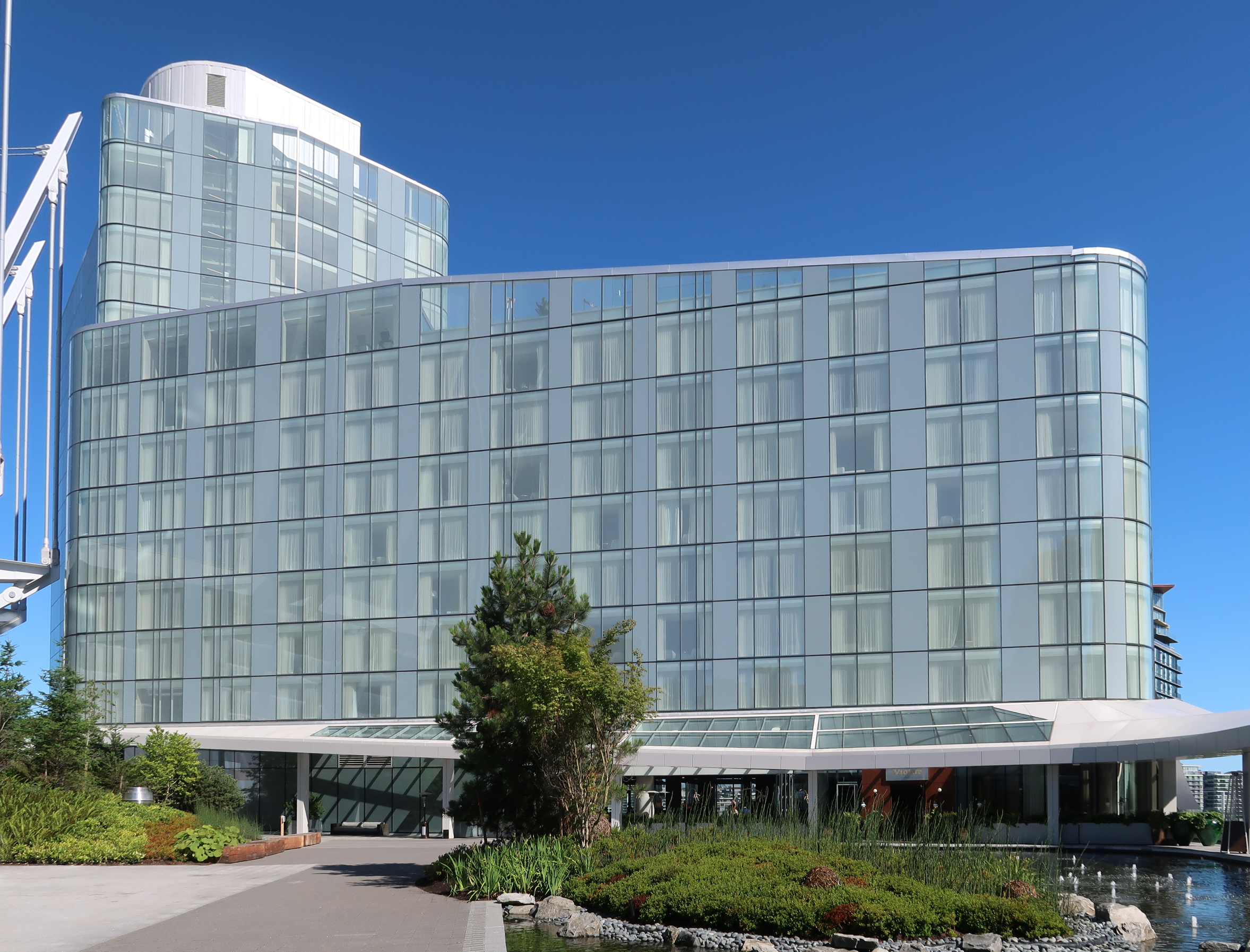
JW Marriott Parq Vancouver

== See also ==
- List of casinos in Canada
