= Purple Reign (show) =

Prince tribute show

Purple Reign is a tribute show featuring the music of Prince. It has been performed mainly at casinos in the Las Vegas area. Jason Tenner produces and stars in the show.

== History ==
The act originated out of The Mothership Connection, a 1970s funk tribute band in which Tenner played in the mid-1990s. Tenner was inspired to begin incorporating Prince's music into the band's act after he dressed as the musician for Halloween in 1996 and received positive feedback on the resemblance. He and other members of The Mothership Connection formed Purple Reign as a band in 1997. It was named after Prince's 1984 hit song, "Purple Rain", and the film of the same name. The group performed regularly at Tom and Jerry's, a bar near the University of Nevada, Las Vegas campus.

In 2001, the band was hired to perform nightly in the lounge at the Boardwalk Hotel and Casino on the Las Vegas Strip. They soon added impersonators of Prince associates Morris Day and Jerome Benton to the lineup. The band remained at the Boardwalk until the hotel closed in 2006. For the next few years, the band performed weekly gigs at various casinos, including Santa Fe Station, Mandalay Bay, and the Monte Carlo. They made an appearance on the Late Show with David Letterman in 2008.

In 2009, Purple Reign made its transition to being a ticketed show, rather than a band playing in open casino lounges; it was signed as a weekend headliner act at the Hooters Casino Hotel. The show moved to The D casino in Downtown Las Vegas in 2012. When the D's showroom closed for renovations eight months later, the show moved back to Hooters and then had a short run at the Planet Hollywood casino, before returning to the D in June 2014.

Tenner moved his show to the Shimmer Cabaret at the Westgate Las Vegas in October 2014. After Prince's death in April 2016, the show gained extra attention, and moved into the hotel's main theater, where a more elaborate stage production was developed. A tribute to Vanity 6, a female vocal group assembled by Prince, was added to the show. Tenner found that the larger venue was too expensive to make the show profitable, however, so he left in October 2017. Purple Reign reopened at the Tropicana Las Vegas the following month.

In March 2024, with the Tropicana preparing to close, the show moved to the V Theater at the Miracle Mile Shops.
