= Tropicana – Las Vegas Boulevard intersection =

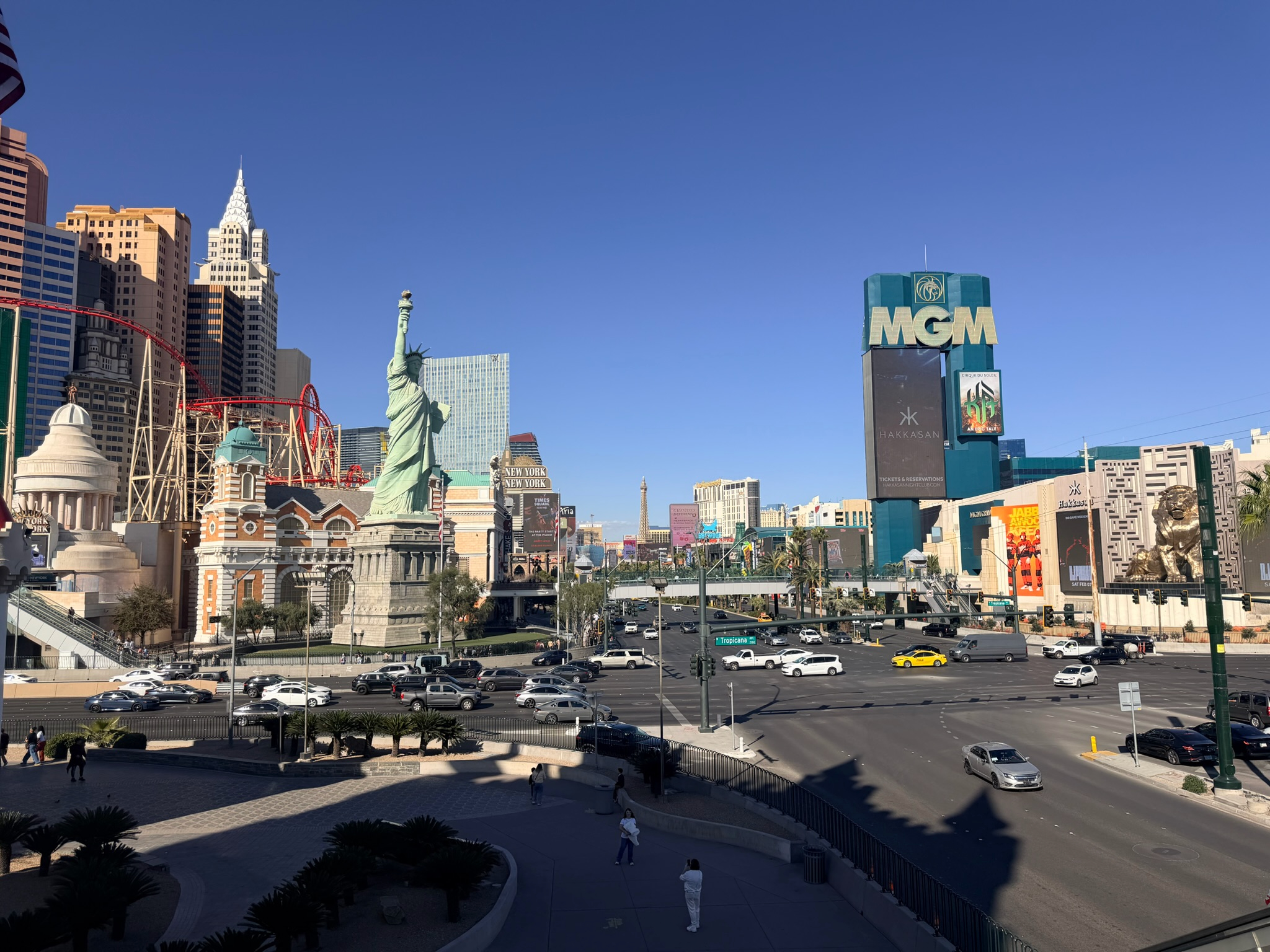
- View of the intersection from the Excalibur
- Interactive map of Tropicana – Las Vegas Boulevard intersection

Location
- Las Vegas Strip
- Coordinates: 36°6′2.288″N 115°10′22.44″W
- Roads at junction: Tropicana Avenue (SR 593); Las Vegas Boulevard (SR 604)

Construction
- Type: Intersection

The Tropicana – Las Vegas Boulevard intersection is a major intersection on the Las Vegas Strip (Tropicana Avenue and Las Vegas Boulevard) in Paradise, Nevada, United States, and is noteworthy for several reasons. It was the first intersection in Las Vegas completely closed to street level pedestrian traffic and its four corners are home to three major resorts: Excalibur Hotel and Casino, New York-New York Hotel and Casino and MGM Grand Las Vegas—the latter has 5,044 rooms and was once the largest hotel in the world. The fourth corner was home to Tropicana, which Tropicana Avenue is named after; it closed on April 2, 2024, and was demolished by implosion on October 9 to make way for a new Bally's Las Vegas and a new baseball stadium for The Athletics after they relocate to Las Vegas. The resorts at the four corners had a total of 12,536 hotel rooms as of 2016.

Tropicana Avenue is also the main local street into Harry Reid International Airport and the first major exit from I-15 to the Strip for traffic heading north from the Los Angeles and San Diego areas. The heavy local traffic on Las Vegas Boulevard, which is listed as a National Scenic Byway All-American Road, further adds to the number of vehicles in this area, making the intersection one of the busiest in the nation.

== History ==
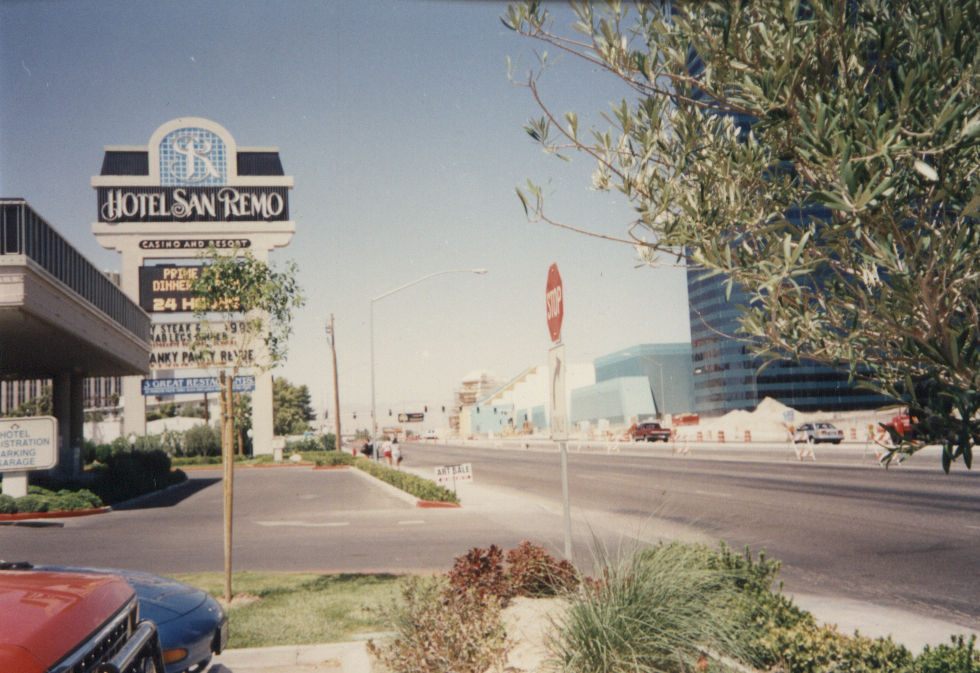
Looking west on Tropicana Avenue, east of the Las Vegas Boulevard intersection, in 1994 by what is now Oyo. Note the lack of elevated pedestrian walkways in the background.

After much study, Clark County officials decided that the only solution to reducing crashes at this intersection that would improve pedestrian and vehicular traffic flow would be to separate the vehicles and pedestrians. Tunnels were considered, but being enclosed and underground posed extra security risks. Thus, uncovered walkways over the streets, using escalators and elevators for access, was selected as the best solution.

Construction began in 1993 on four, open air pedestrian walkways, one bridging each leg of the intersection, with platforms at the ends providing elevator and escalator access between the street and walkway level. The project included barricades between the sidewalks and streets in the vicinity of the intersection, eliminating the at-grade crosswalks.

In 2016 and 2017, the walkways received aesthetic improvements and the escalators were replaced.
