= Edgewater Casino (Vancouver) =

Casino in British Columbia, Canada (2005–2017)

The Edgewater Casino
- Interactive map of The Edgewater Casino
- Location: Vancouver, British Columbia; 750 Pacific Blvd South Vancouver, British Columbia; 49.2757°N 123.1096°W
- Opened: February 2005
- Closed: September 29, 2017

The Edgewater Casino was a casino located at 760 Pacific Blvd South Vancouver, British Columbia. It was in operation from 2005 to 2017, after which it was replaced by the newly-opened Parq Casino.

== History ==
The Edgewater Casino opened in February 2005 under the ownership of investors Leonard Libin and Gary Jackson, occupying the Enterprise Hall at the Plaza of Nations. The Edgewater was conceived as a temporary casino, with the city targeting the eventual development of a permanent casino in downtown Vancouver. Its gaming floor included 600 slot machines and 75 table games. In 2006, Nevada-based Paragon Gaming acquired the Edgewater Casino out of bankruptcy. Paragon had recently begun construction of the River Cree Casino on Enoch Cree Nation 135 near Edmonton, during which its CEO Scott Menke frequently visited Vancouver.

In 2010, Paragon Gaming announced a proposal to relocate Edgewater Casino to a new, $500 million property adjacent to nearby BC Place. The new casino would be triple the size of Edgewater, and planned to feature 1,500 slot machines and 150 table games. While the relocation of the casino license to the new property was approved, Vancouver City Council blocked the expansion of casino gaming.

In September 2013, Paragon announced a revised proposal with new investors, retooling the development as an "urban resort" with two high-end hotels, restaurants, and event spaces in addition to the casino—which would maintain the same number of tables and slot machines as Edgewater. The new, $640 million casino resort opened on September 27, 2017 as Parq Vancouver; Edgewater Casino officially closed earlier in the day, and all employees were transferred to Parq.

== Statistics ==
In 2013, it generated $6.6 million for the city. In 2014 it was $7.2 million. In 2015, it was $8.3 million and 2016 it was $8.6 million.

== Events ==
The Casino was well known for its hosting of live events. The 2016 Karaoke World Championships were held at the casino. The competition ran from the 1st of November to the 6th.

The Canada International Film Festival is an annual event that had been hosted by the casino since 2009. In 2014, it was held from March 28–29.
