= Plaza of Nations =

Former entertainment complex in Vancouver, British Columbia, Canada

Coordinates: 49.275015°N 123.110175°W

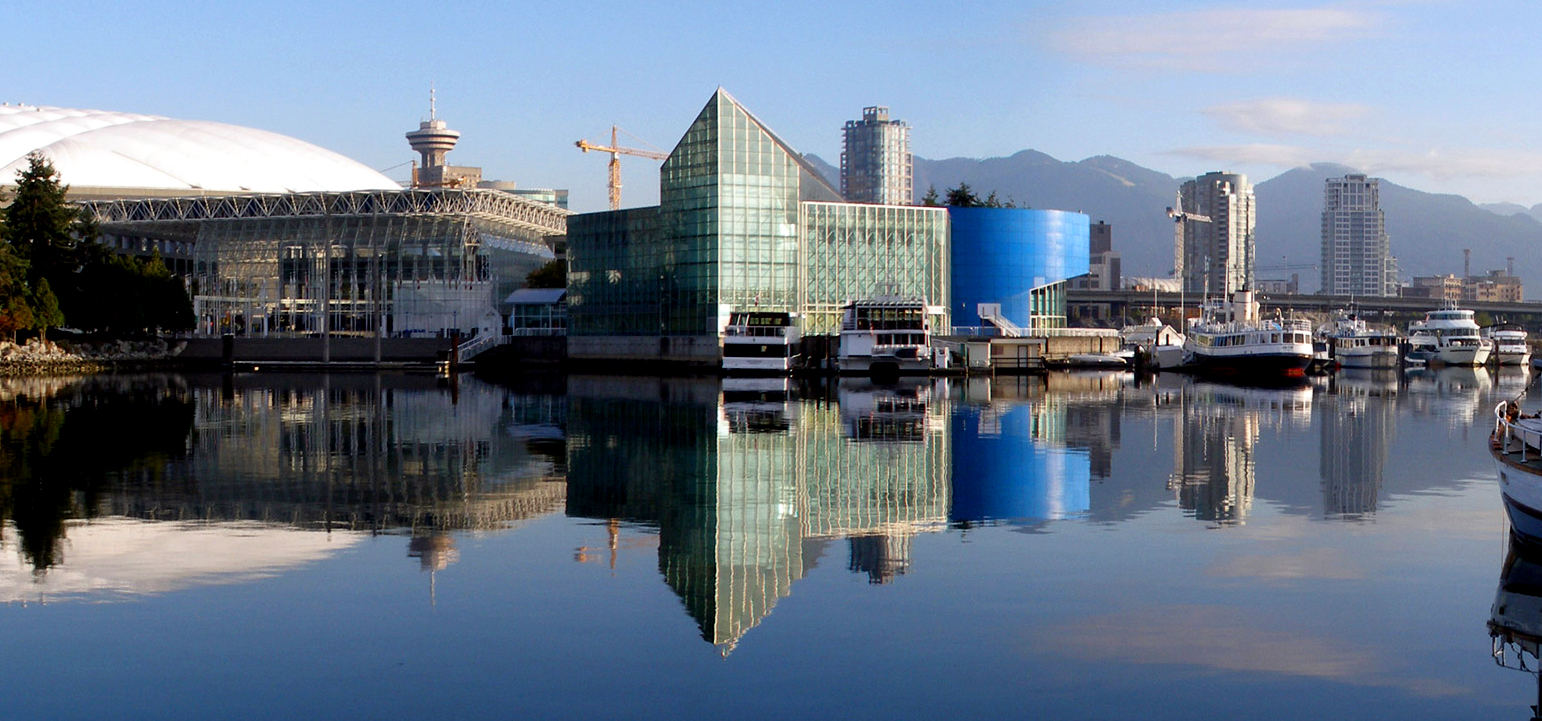
Plaza of Nations from False Creek, before demolition in 2007.

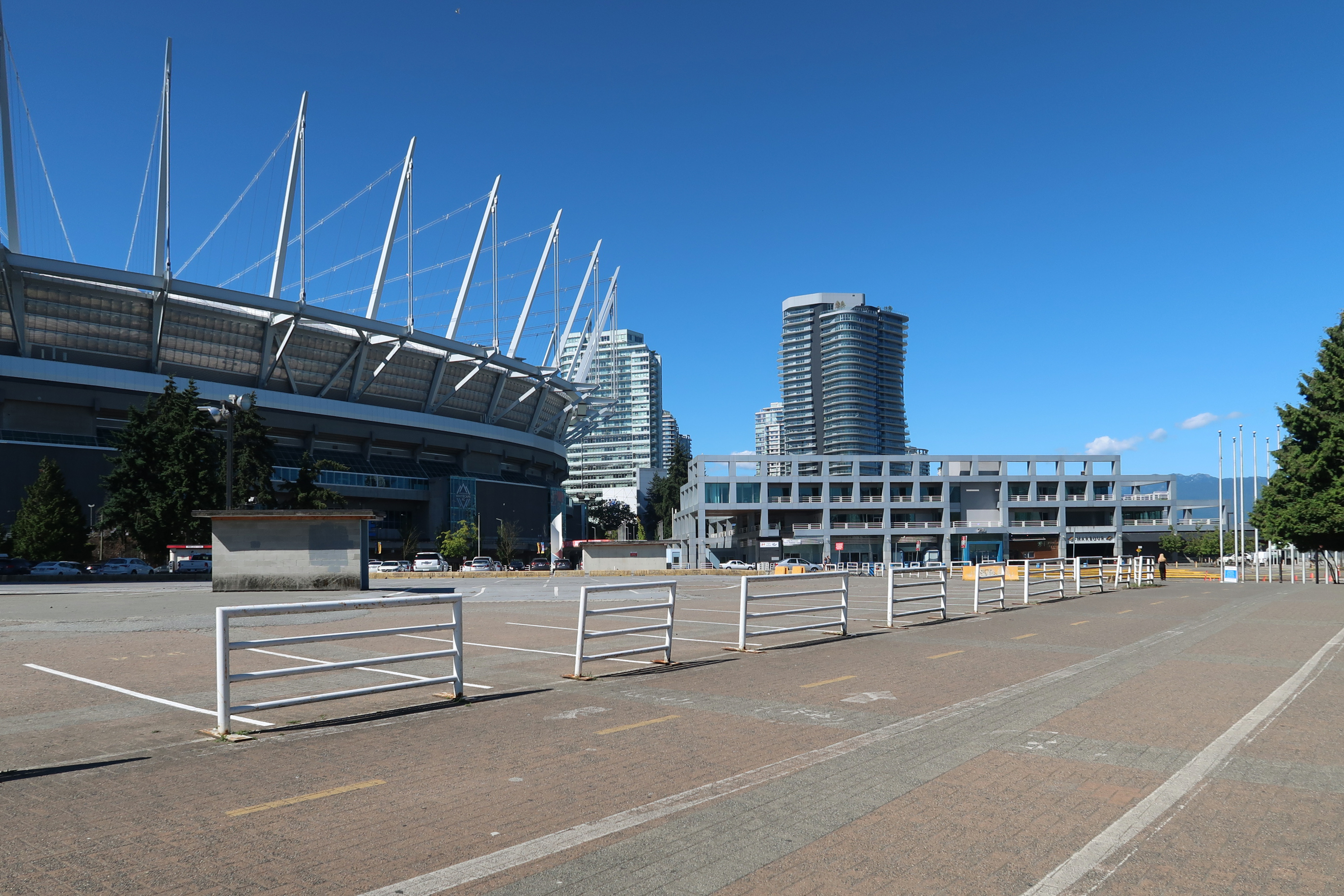
Plaza of Nations after demolition (2018).

The Plaza of Nations was an entertainment complex located on the northeast shore of False Creek in Vancouver, British Columbia.

It was part of the British Columbia Pavilion during Expo '86, and along with Science World, Canada Place, and the Roundhouse Community Centre, it had been one of the remaining physical reminders of the Expo. The sheltered plaza had a capacity of 4,500 for performances. The Plaza had been nominated by the city's Heritage Commission to be added to the Vancouver Heritage Register. Along with the Roundhouse and Science World, Plaza of Nations was considered important for demarcating the spatial extent of the world's fair, which was a transformative event for the city in its centennial year. It was decided in 2007 that the building was to be demolished completely, leaving the Edgewater Casino as the only remaining structure, itself closing in 2017.

Plaza of Nations consisted of Enterprise Hall, the West Building, the East Building, and the Covered Plaza. It has been owned by Canadian Metropolitan Properties since 1990. The site housed Edgewater Casino, until its relocation to Parq Vancouver in September 2017, and hosted various cultural and entertainment events, including the Dragon Boat Festival, and has been a popular events venue for various ethnic communities in Vancouver, as well as for corporate events.

Plaza of Nations was the only outdoor sheltered plaza in Vancouver, as well as the city's only cultural venue on the waterfront. It was also an important mid-size venue for popular music acts, with artists such as Foo Fighters, Hootie & the Blowfish, Fugazi, My Morning Jacket and Garbage, performing concerts at the venue.

The Plaza was used for a filming location for numerous projects, such as the Stargate SG-1 episode "2010", Final Destination 2, several episodes of The Outer Limits and Zenon: Girl of the 21st Century and it served as the stadium precinct in Continuum.

Planned as a temporary structure to be torn down after Expo '86, the glass roof of the plaza was found to be unsafe by city officials in November 2006, with notices to that effect being posted in the offices of the ownership on Wednesday, November 22 and subsequently the area under the canopy was fenced off for public safety. The sudden closure forced the events planned for the space to move with little or no notice (see Portobello West). In January 2007, the ownership decided that the cost of repairing the roof was too high, and opted to demolish both the roof and its two adjoining office buildings. As of November 2007, demolition of the roof has been completed and all tenants of the adjoining structures have vacated. Plans for use of the space have not been released, however the owners and the City of Vancouver are planning continued use of the plaza as a covered outdoor performance venue. As of March 2008, the west building office structure is completely demolished. The future of the site remains unclear as the east office complex has not been abandoned and the plaza concert amphitheater was rebuilt and restored with the original seating and new flooring.

Oei Hong Leong bought the Plaza of Nations site from Li Ka-shing in 1989 for CAN$40 million. The site has been renamed Expo Gardens and there are plans to build 1.4 million sq ft of residential property and 700,000 sq ft of commercial and retail property. It was reported in The Vancouver Sun, Jan 2025, that the waterfront property in Vancouver was sold for hundreds of millions of dollars to minority partners based in Hong Kong.
