= Millionaire for Life =

American lottery drawing game

- Region: United States (30 states and the District of Columbia)
- First draw: February 22, 2026
- Operator: Multi-State Lottery Association
- Highest jackpot: $1 million/year in perpetuity (minimum guaranteed annuity payout over 20 years); $18 million (one-time cash payment option)
- Odds of winning jackpot: 1 in 22,910,580.00
- Website: www.powerball.com/millionaire-for-life

Millionaire for Life is an American multi-state lottery drawing game operated by the Multi-State Lottery Association (MUSL). It is currently offered in 30 states as well as the District of Columbia; drawings are conducted nightly at 11:15 p.m. Eastern Time and use a random number generator (RNG) to select the numbers. Ticket sales commenced on February 22, 2026, and the inaugural drawing took place that evening.

The game replaced two other MUSL-sanctioned multi-state draw games, Cash4Life and Lucky For Life, in 28 of the 31 states where either of the retired games were previously offered; of the predecessor games’ former participants, Delaware (which offered Lucky for Life), Maryland, Florida, and Missouri (all of which offered Cash4Life) elected not to transition to the new game at launch. Mississippi and West Virginia, neither of which offered the predecessor games, joined Millionaire for Life when it commenced play.

== Rules ==
Each game costs $5 to play. Players then select five white ball numbers from 1-58 and an additional number from 1-5, the green "Millionaire Ball." Matching all five white balls as well as the Millionaire Ball will win $1,000,000 a year for life (with a guaranteed payout for 20 years) or $18,000,000 upfront in cash.

== Odds and prizes ==
Matches		Prize	Odds
White Balls (58)	Millionaire Ball (5)	Prize	Odds
5	1	$1 million/year in perpetuity (or $18 million cash option)	1 in 22,910,580.00
5	0	$100,000/year in perpetuity (or $2.2 million cash option)	1 in 5,727,645.00
4	1	$7,500	1 in 86,455.02
4	0	$500	1 in 21,613.75
3	1	$250	1 in 1,662.60
3	0	$50	1 in 415.65
2	1	$25	1 in 97.80
2	0	$8	1 in 24.45
1	1	$8	1 in 15.65

== Participating lotteries ==
Map of U.S states and territories offering Millionaire for Life as of April 20, 2026

Members	Joined	Replaced
Arkansas	2026	LFL
Colorado	2026	LFL
Connecticut	2026	LFL
Delaware	2026	LFL
District of Columbia	2026	LFL
Georgia	2026	C4L
Idaho	2026	LFL
Indiana	2026	C4L
Iowa	2026	LFL
Kansas	2026	LFL
Kentucky	2026	LFL
Maine	2026	LFL
Massachusetts	2026	LFL
Mississippi	2026	—
Michigan	2026	LFL
Montana	2026	LFL
Nebraska	2026	LFL
New Hampshire	2026	LFL
New Jersey	2026	C4L
New York	2026	C4L
North Carolina	2026	LFL
North Dakota	2026	LFL
Ohio	2026	LFL
Oklahoma	2026	LFL
Pennsylvania	2026	C4L
Rhode Island	2026	LFL
South Dakota	2026	LFL
Tennessee	2026	C4L
Virginia	2026	C4L
Vermont	2026	LFL
West Virginia	2026	—
Wyoming	2026	LFL

Key

- C4L = Cash4Life
- LFL = Lucky for Life
