= Hot Lotto =

American lottery game

Hot Lotto logo

Hot Lotto was a multi-state lottery game administered by the Iowa-based Multi-State Lottery Association (MUSL), which is best known for operating the Powerball game.

Hot Lotto began sales on April 7, 2002; its first drawing was on April 10. Hot Lotto gave smaller lotteries the opportunity to create the "middle-sized" jackpots that are commonplace in single-state games in populous states such as in California, New York, and Florida.

Hot Lotto drawings were held Wednesday and Saturday at MUSL's headquarters in West Des Moines, Iowa. Normally, the Hot Lotto drawing was immediately following the 9:59 p.m. Central Time Powerball drawing. Unlike Mega Millions or Powerball, the Hot Lotto drawings were not televised; its drawings used a random number generator (RNG), instead of ball-drawing machines.

The Sizzler option, which tripled non-jackpot prizes, was added in 2008. The basic game, $1 per play, was unchanged until 2013, when the advertised jackpot changed from the annuity value (25 equal yearly payments) to cash, and "taxes-paid"; the annuity option was eliminated, as winners almost always chose cash instead of the long-term payout.

In 2017, it was announced that Hot Lotto would be discontinued due to falling sales and a 2010 fraud scandal first uncovered in 2015; its final drawing was on October 28, 2017. It was replaced by a new version of Lotto America, which launched on November 12, 2017, and held its first drawing three days later.

== Rules ==
A player paid $1 to play five numbers from 1 through 47, plus one additional number, the "Hot Ball", from 1 through 19 drawn from a second, separate pool. Players could choose their own numbers or have the lottery terminal choose random numbers.

=== Sizzler option ===
Hot Lotto had an option called Sizzler where players could pay an additional dollar to win triple the normal amount of a non-jackpot prize. The $30,000 second prize became $90,000 if the player activated the Sizzler option, for example.

The Sizzler option began in January 2008, although Idaho and the District of Columbia did not immediately offer it.

== Prizes ==
| Matches | Prize | with Sizzler | Odds of winning |
|---|---|---|---|
| Hot Ball only (0+1) | $2 | $6 | 1:34 |
| 1 white ball number plus HB (1+1) | $3 | $9 | 1:52 |
| 2 WB numbers plus HB (2+1) | $6 | $18 | 1:254 |
| 3 WB numbers (3+0) | $6 | $18 | 1:188 |
| 3 WB numbers plus HB (3+1) | $50 | $150 | 1:3,385 |
| 4 WB numbers (4+0) | $100 | $300 | 1:7,710 |
| 4 WB numbers plus HB (4+1) | $3,000 | $9,000 | 1:138,785 |
| All 5 WB numbers without HB (5+0) | $30,000 | $90,000 | 1:1,619,158 |
| All 5 WB numbers plus HB (5+1) | Net cash jackpot | N/A | 1:29,144,841 |

Overall odds were 1:17.

=== Prizes ===
Prizes were determined by a modified parimutuel system; except under special circumstances, only the jackpot was shared among multiple winners.

A jackpot won on or before May 11, 2013, entitled a winner of the choice of the present cash value of the jackpot, or receiving an annuity paid out over 25 equal yearly payments totaling the full advertised jackpot value. These winners had 25 percent withheld towards federal taxes (and additional withholding in most cases.) The annuity option was dropped as most winners took the cash option.

The minimum jackpot was $1,000,000; rollovers were at least $50,000 per drawing. A jackpot winner received cash (although not necessarily in one payment); however, the "pre-withholding" amount must be declared for income tax purposes.

Depending on where a Hot Lotto ticket was purchased, winners (jackpot or otherwise) had from 90 days to 1 year in which to claim their prize.

The final Hot Lotto drawing did not produce a jackpot winner; its 13 members agreed to use the funds to augment the initial jackpot for its replacement, Lotto America.

== Final members ==
| Members | Joined |
|---|---|
| Delaware | January 2008 |
| Idaho | October 2007 |
| Iowa † | |
| Kansas | March 2006 |
| Maine | October 2009 |
| Minnesota † | |
| Montana † | |
| New Hampshire †§ | |
| New Mexico | November 2006 |
| North Dakota | June 2004 |
| Oklahoma | |
| South Dakota † | |
| Tennessee | May 2013 |
| West Virginia † | |

† Charter member

§ All Hot Lotto members (when game ended in October 2017) offered Lotto America when it began in November 2017, with the exception of New Hampshire which joined in June 2018.

=== Previous members ===
- District of Columbia (April 2004–December 24, 2016)
- Vermont (July 2009–May 17, 2014)

== Fraud scandal ==
On July 20, 2015, Eddie Raymond Tipton, MUSL's director of information security, was found guilty of two counts of fraud for rigging a Hot Lotto drawing in December 2010, and then fraudulently attempting to claim the prize anonymously. Prosecutors believed that Tipton had used his privileged access to the secured room housing the Hot Lotto computer for servicing, in order to install a rootkit that rigged the $16.5 million drawing held on December 29, 2010. He then purchased a ticket containing the rigged numbers from a convenience store in Des Moines, even though as a MUSL employee he was prohibited from taking part in any lottery game. Nearly a year later, the "winning" ticket of the draw was routed through several accomplices, including a Belize-based investment trust that was said to represent its owner, in an attempt to claim it anonymously, but the prize claims were rejected per Iowa Lottery policy forbidding anonymous claims.

By means of a person from Quebec City identified as the trust's president, the trust was found to be connected to two people from Sugar Land, Texas, including Robert Rhodes, with whom Tipton has professional relations and had contact with and was in Des Moines during the period that Tipton had purchased the ticket. Rhodes would also be arrested in Texas on two counts of fraud. Allegations that Tipton had rigged the drawing were presented during Tipton's trial in April 2015. Tipton has since been accused of rigging other lottery draws.

On January 28, 2018, GSN aired an original documentary special Cover Story: the Notorious Lottery Heist which covered the scandal.
