= List of five-number lottery games =

Lottery games with five-number draws

The following is a list of lottery games in which five regular numbers are drawn from a larger set of numbers. The list includes the name, the number field for each, and the frequency of drawings. All pick-5 games in the U.S. and Canada are drawn multiple times per week (usually nightly, including Sundays and holidays); some lotteries now hold such drawings more than once a day.

Most U.S. pick-5 games now have a progressive jackpot, even in games that are drawn daily; in unusual cases, a single ticket has won a cash prize in excess of $1 million. A common top prize in non-jackpot pick-5 games is $100,000. Depending on the game, a minimum of either two or three numbers (not counting a "bonus ball") must be matched for a winning ticket. A 2/5 match usually results in a free play for that game, or a "break-even" win; for the latter, the player wins back their stake on that particular five-number wager. Prize payouts depending on the game are either fixed (with parimutuel exceptions), are always parimutuel, or feature a parimutuel jackpot with fixed lower-tier prizes.

With very few exceptions, all U.S. and Canadian games where five regular numbers are drawn from the same pool have had a lump sum jackpot/grand prize, hence the word Cash is used as part of the name of several such games.

Except where noted, all current pick-5 games listed here cost $1 per play. Some pick-5 games have introduced an add-on wager, usually $1, either as an "instant match" feature, as a multiplier, or, as in the additional 50-cent Connecticut Cash 5 wager Kicker, to give a player additional prize levels. An increasingly popular style of pick-5 game is based on Caribbean stud poker; such games combine a "traditional" drawing with an instant-win feature.

The lists do not include "4+1" games, such as Florida's Lucky Money, where all five numbers must be matched to win the top prize, but are drawn from two number fields. A similar game, Montana's Big Sky Bonus, is actually a "four-number" game; the double matrix is 4/31 + 1/16 (previously 4/28 + 1/17). Matching all four "regular" numbers wins the jackpot; matching the "bonus" ball wins $10 plus any money won for matching at least two of the four "regular" numbers.

DC-5, Delaware's Play 5, Florida's Pick 5, Georgia Five, Louisiana's Pick 5, Maryland's Pick 5, Ohio's Pick 5, Pennsylvania's Pick 5, and Virginia's Pick 5 also do not truly fit this category, as they are five-digit numbers games with "straight" and "box" wagers played like many U.S. pick-3 and pick-4 games.

== History and overview ==
Five-number lottery games have been part of the North American lottery landscape since the 1980s. They were introduced as lower-cost, daily-draw alternatives to larger jackpot games such as Lotto America and later Powerball. Their relatively small number field makes it easier for players to win prizes, which in turn increases frequency of play and provides steady lottery revenue.

By the 2000s, nearly every state and provincial lottery had introduced a variant of a five-number game, often under names such as Cash 5, Fantasy 5 or Match 5. In some jurisdictions, these draws are held twice daily, and many games have added online play options via official lottery websites or mobile apps.

== Gameplay and odds ==
In most pick-5 games, players choose five numbers from a pool ranging from 30 to 47. The odds of winning the jackpot vary depending on the pool size, ranging from about 1 in 142,506 (in a 5/30 game) to 1 in 1,533,939 (in a 5/47 game). Lower-tier prizes are awarded for matching fewer numbers.

- Example: In a 5/39 format (e.g., California Fantasy 5), the jackpot odds are 1 in 575,757.
- In games with poker-style instant wins (e.g., Poker Lotto in Canada), prizes can also be won immediately without waiting for the nightly draw.

== U.S. pick-5 games ==
=== Multi-jurisdictional ===
- Tri-State Lottery (Maine, New Hampshire, Vermont) Gimme5 (39 numbers; Monday to Friday)

=== Single-jurisdictional ===
- Arizona Fantasy 5 (41 numbers, daily)
- Arkansas Natural State Jackpot (39 numbers, daily)
- California Fantasy 5 (39 numbers, daily)
- Colorado Cash 5 (32 numbers, daily)
- Connecticut Cash5 (35 numbers, nightly)
- Florida Fantasy 5 (36 numbers, twice daily)
- Georgia Fantasy 5 (42 numbers, daily)
- Idaho Idaho Ca$h (45 numbers, 2 plays/$1, daily)
- Illinois Lucky Day Lotto (45 numbers, twice daily)
- Indiana Cash 5 (45 numbers, daily)
- Louisiana Easy 5 (37 numbers, Wednesday & Saturday)
- Maryland Bonus Match 5 (39 numbers, daily)
- Massachusetts Mass Cash (35 numbers, twice daily)
- Michigan Fantasy 5 (39 numbers, daily); Poker Lotto (52 cards; daily)
- Minnesota Gopher 5 (47 numbers, Mon/Wed/Fri); North 5 (31 numbers, daily)
- Mississippi Match 5 (35 numbers, daily)
- Missouri Show Me Ca$h (39 numbers, daily)
- Montana Montana Cash (45 numbers, 2 plays/$1, Wed & Sat)
- Nebraska Pick 5 (40 numbers, daily)
- New Jersey Jersey Cash 5 (45 numbers, daily)
- New Mexico Roadrunner Cash (37 numbers, daily)
- New York Take 5 (39 numbers, twice daily)
- North Carolina Carolina Cash 5 (43 numbers, daily)
- Ohio Rolling Cash 5 (39 numbers, daily)
- Oklahoma Cash 5 (36 numbers, daily)
- Pennsylvania Cash 5 (43 numbers, nightly); Treasure Hunt (30 numbers, daily midday)
- Rhode Island Wild Money (38 numbers, daily)
- South Carolina Palmetto Cash 5 (42 numbers, daily)
- South Dakota Dakota Cash (35 numbers, Wed & Sat)
- Tennessee Daily Tennessee Jackpot (38 numbers, daily)
- Texas Cash Five (35 numbers; daily except Sunday)
- Virginia Cash 5 (45 numbers, daily)
- Washington Hit 5 (42 numbers, daily)
- Wisconsin Badger 5 (31 numbers, daily)
- Wyoming Cowboy Draw (45 numbers, 2 plays/$5, Mon & Thu)

== Current Canadian pick-5 games ==
- Atlantic Lottery Corporation Bucko! (41 numbers, daily); Poker Lotto (52 cards, daily)
- Ontario Poker Lotto (52 cards, daily); Lightning Lotto (49 numbers, daily)
- Québec Lotto Poker (52 cards; daily);
- Western Canada Poker Lotto (52 cards, daily); Lightning Lotto (49 numbers, daily)

== Other international games ==
- Mexico: Chispazo (28 numbers; twice daily)
- Russia: Sportloto 5 out of 36 (36 numbers + 1 of 4 bonus balls; every 30 minutes)
- South Africa: Daily Lotto (36 numbers; daily)
- United Kingdom: Thunderball (39 numbers + 1 of 14 bonus balls; Tue/Wed/Fri/Sat)

== See also ==
- List of six-number lottery games
