= Lottery fraud =

Claiming a lottery prize by deception or forgery

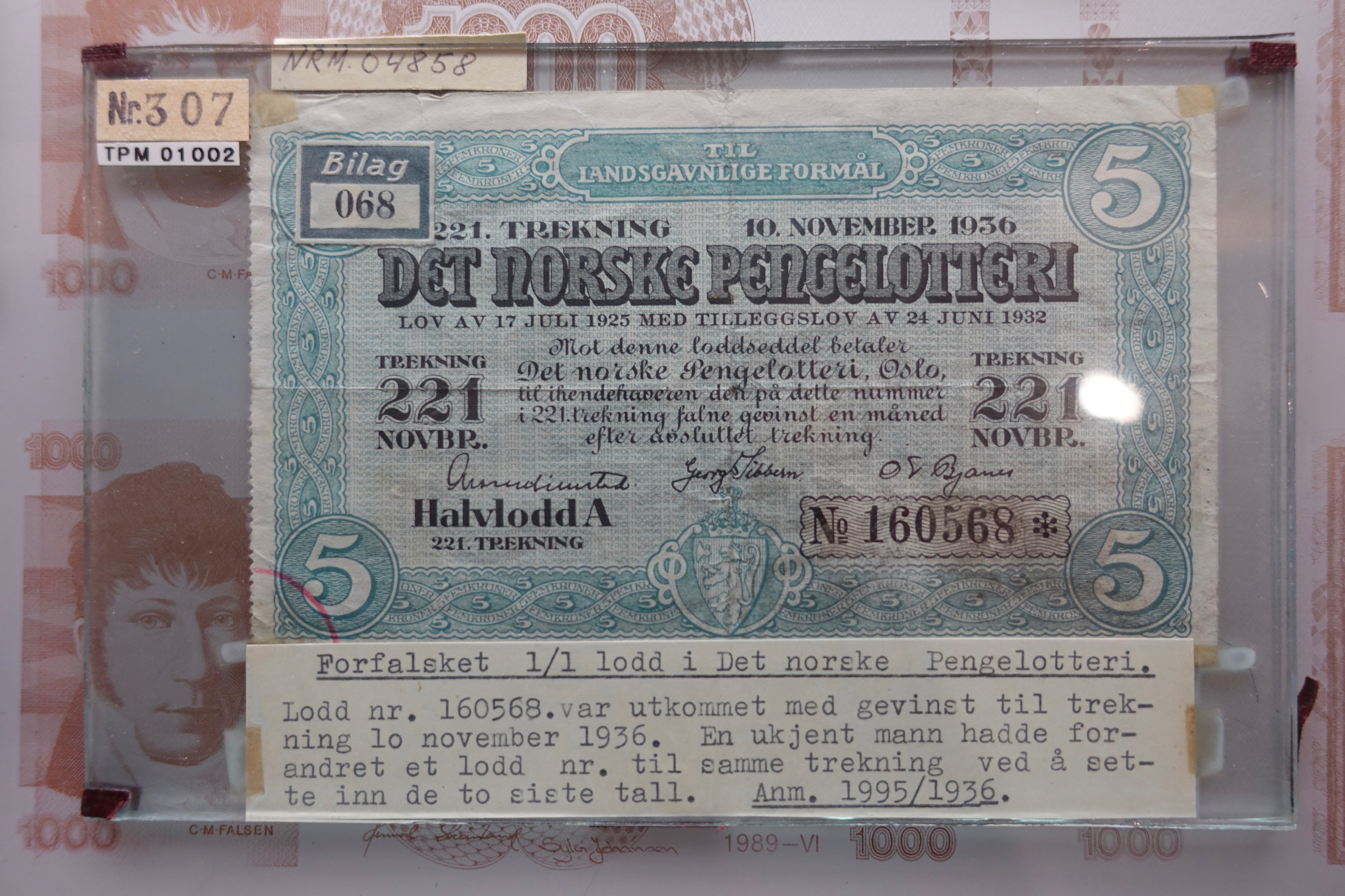
Forged lottery ticket from 1936, displayed in the Norwegian National Museum of Justice, Trondheim

Lottery fraud is any act committed to defraud a lottery game. A perpetrator attempts to win a jackpot prize through fraudulent means. The aim is to defraud the organisation running the lottery of money, or in the case of a stolen lottery ticket, to defraud an individual of their legitimately won prize.

Several common techniques are used, including using a forged or altered lottery ticket to claim a prize, or presenting a genuine, stolen ticket to claim a prize through misrepresentation. There are also cases of insider fraud, where employees or agents involved in the lottery have exploited their position to fraudulently claim prizes for themselves, such as tampering with the lottery draw process itself. In many countries, players can present their lottery tickets in person at retail outlets to check for winning numbers at the point of sale; cases have emerged of retailers failing to inform customers of their winnings and then claiming the prizes for themselves.

An alternative form of lottery fraud, commonly known as a lottery scam, takes the form of informing an individual by email, letter or phone call that they have won a lottery prize. The victim is instructed to pay a fee to enable the non-existent winnings to be processed. This type is a form of advance-fee fraud and a common email scam.

== Noted cases ==
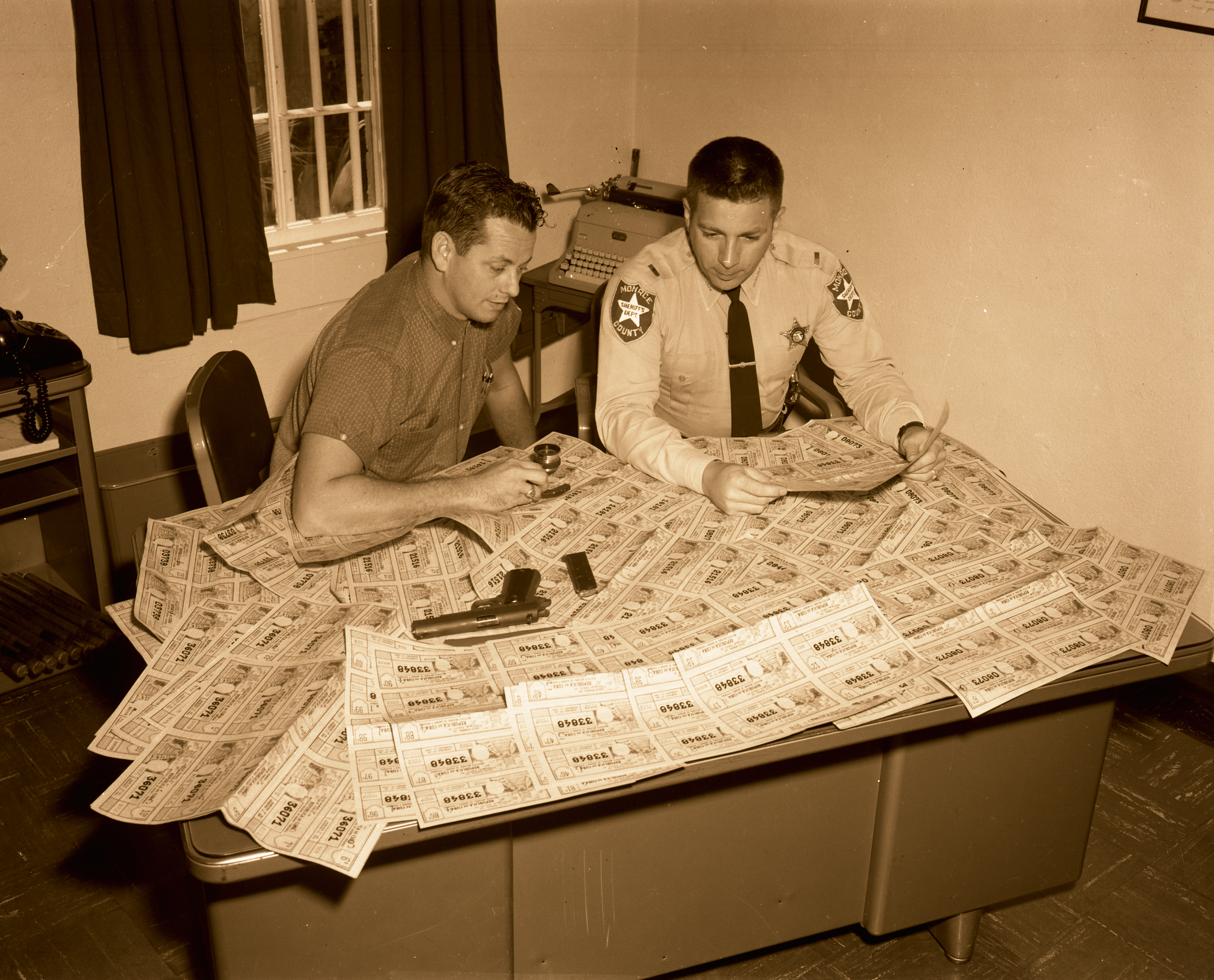
Monroe County police officers examining fake Cuban lottery tickets (c.1960)

A number of high-profile cases have emerged of lottery fraud around the world. A counterfeit ticket scandal was recorded in 1913–1914 which involved fake tickets from the Cuban lottery being sold in Puerto Rico, South Florida and the West Indies. The fraud was perpetrated by Cuban officials inside the lottery. During the 1960s, Colombian drug lord Pablo Escobar's early petty criminal activities included selling fake lottery tickets. In 1999, a case of draw tampering emerged in Italy when the balls of the national Lotto were treated with varnish or heated. The blindfolded children who drew the winning numbers were then secretly instructed to pick preselected numbers by feeling for treated balls.

=== Canada ===
Between 1999 and 2006, the Ontario Lottery and Gaming Corporation (OLG) was subject to widespread retailer fraud. Authorities noticed that an improbably large number of lottery retailers in Ontario were winning major prizes, from $50,000 to $12.5 million. Evidence emerged that certain retailers were failing to inform customers of their winnings when they presented their lottery tickets in-store, and then fraudulently claiming prizes for themselves. An investigation found evidence of widespread insider fraud among lottery retailers, including collusion with employees and family members. Four OLG officials were fined and dismissed.

=== United States ===
In 1980, Nick Perry, TV host of the Pennsylvania Lottery, was at the centre of the 1980 Pennsylvania Lottery scandal, a fraud that involved creating replicas of the official ping-pong balls used in the Pennsylvania Lottery machines. The specially weighted balls ensured that limited combinations of numbers were likely to be drawn. Perry's accomplices then purchased a large number of tickets around the state corresponding to the predicted draw results, enabling them to claim approximately $1.8 million in prize money. Suspicions were aroused when authorities noticed that a large number of tickets were purchased for the eight possible combinations. On 20 May 1981, Perry was convicted of criminal conspiracy, criminal mischief, theft by deception, rigging a publicly exhibited contest and perjury, and was sentenced to seven years in prison. His accomplices were also tried and convicted. A fictionalized version of the scandal was the basis of the screenplay for the 2000 film Lucky Numbers.

In 2010, in the Hot Lotto fraud scandal, Eddie Raymond Tipton, former information security director of the Multi-State Lottery Association (MUSL) (which also controls the Powerball game), rigged a random number generator to defraud the Hot Lotto lottery game of $14.3 million. On 20 July 2015, Tipton was found guilty on two counts of fraud and sentenced to ten years' imprisonment. Subsequent criminal investigations revealed that Tipton had also rigged other state lotteries: the Colorado Lottery in 2005 ($568,990 jackpot prize paid to Tipton's brother Tommy); the Wisconsin Lottery in 2007 ($783,257 prize paid to Tipton's accomplice); and the Oklahoma Lottery in 2011 ($1.2 million prize). Tipton was tried again in 2017 and sentenced to 25 years in prison.

=== United Kingdom ===
In 2009, a couple found a National Lottery ticket on the floor of a supermarket in Swindon. The ticket bore winning numbers and the couple claimed £30,000 in prize money. The woman who bought the ticket had retained her receipt as proof of purchase. The couple who found the ticket were charged with theft and making a false representation, and received an 11-month suspended sentence.

Several cases of insider fraud by retailers have been uncovered by investigators. In 2011, a shopkeeper in Watton, Norfolk, retained a winning lottery ticket and later claimed the £156,000 prize herself. She and her husband were later jailed for 14 months. In 2012, an Oldham newsagent falsely told a woman that her lottery ticket had won nothing and then claimed the £1 million prize for himself. He was sentenced to 30 months in prison. In Gravesend, another newsagent falsely claimed an £80,000 with a lottery ticket purchased by a customer, and was given a non-custodial sentence.

In 2009 an employee of Camelot — the company that operates the UK National Lottery — conspired with a member of the public, Edward Putman, of Kings Langley in Hertfordshire, to claim a jackpot prize using a bogus ticket. The employee, who worked in Camelot's fraud department, found a way to forge lottery tickets bearing winning numbers. Putman was initially prosecuted in July 2012 for benefit fraud after failing to declare lottery winnings of nearly £5 million whilst in receipt of welfare benefits. Although police did not have enough evidence to bring a prosecution at the time, the case was investigated by the Gambling Commission in December 2016, who found that Camelot had breached the terms of its operating licence in failing to investigate the veracity of the prize claim before paying out and fined Camelot £3 million. The case was subsequently investigated further, and in October 2019 Putman was jailed for 9 years for defrauding the National Lottery of £2.5 million.

=== China ===
In the 2004 Chinese lottery scandal, a contractor at the Shaanxi Provincial Sports Lottery Centre in Shaanxi Province attempted to claim a prize of a new BMW car using a fake lottery ticket.

In 2005, a lotto retailer in Anshan, Liaoning Province, exploited a flaw in a lottery draw process that allowed him to continue to sell lottery tickets up to five minutes after the winning numbers had been announced. He bought a ticket with winning numbers and claimed a prize of $3.76 million, but eventually he was caught and sentenced to life imprisonment.

=== Vietnam ===
In Vietnam, lottery fraud has occurred on many different scales, from small to large, causing great damage to the state and the people. Lottery fraud takes many different forms, including: fraud in the lottery drawing process, fraud in the lottery printing process, fraud in the lottery ticket sales process.

== In popular culture ==
Lottery fraud has featured in films, television productions, and literature. David Baldacci's 1997 novel The Winner follows an impoverished young woman who is approached by a mysterious man that offers to arrange for her to win a $100,000,000 national lottery on the condition that she leaves the United States and never returns. The 2000 film Lucky Numbers depicts a TV weatherman, Russ Richards (John Travolta), who rigs the Pennsylvania Lottery in a story inspired by the 1980 Pennsylvania Lottery scandal. In Class Warfare (2001), two high school students plot to murder a classmate to gain possession of his winning lottery ticket. In Ridley Scott's 2003 film Matchstick Men, con artist Roy Waller (Nicolas Cage) teaches his daughter how to con a woman into believing she has won the lottery, and she shares her expected winnings with them. A 2011 episode of the BBC TV documentary series The Real Hustle, a group of scammers pretend to be a lottery syndicate who have won a lottery. They persuade a member of the public to cash the ticket for them with a promise of a share in the prize pool.
