= New Mexico Lottery =

Lottery for the state of New Mexico

The New Mexico Lottery is run by the government of New Mexico. It was established in 1996. It is a member of the Multi-State Lottery Association (MUSL). It offers draw games and scratch off games. As of December 2014, draw games are Powerball, Mega Millions, Monopoly Millionaires' Club, Hot Lotto, Roadrunner Cash, Pick 3, Quicksters, and Lucky Numbers Bingo.

The New Mexico Lottery Authority is separate from the New Mexico government. A seven-person board of directors appointed by the Government of New Mexico operates the Lottery, which has oversight from the Legislative Finance Committee.

New Mexico requires lottery players to be at least 18.

== Notable prizes ==
The largest prize to date won on a ticket bought in New Mexico was for the Powerball drawing on September 27, 2008. The ticket was worth $206.9 million, payable in 30 annual payments (increasing by 4 percent yearly), or about $102.9 million cash value.

== New Mexico–only draw games ==
=== Roadrunner Cash ===
Roadrunner Cash drawings are every night at approximately 9:45 pm Mountain Time. It draws five numbers from 1 through 37. Tickets cost $1 per play per drawing. The jackpot starts at $25,000, increasing by at least $2,000 if there is no play matching all five numbers.

Historically the game was introduced in 1998 as a pick 5 out of 34 game with a jackpot that started at $20,000 and grew until it was won and drawings were held every day of the week. The game drew 6 numbers from 1-34 for each drawing (with the 6th being the bonus number which only applies to non jackpot prizes to help players win more money). On October 5, 2009, the Sunday drawing was discontinued after the game switched to 5/37 from 5/34. A prize for matching two of the winning numbers drawn was also added to the prize structure (originally players who matched at least three of the winning numbers drawn with the numbers on their Roadrunner Cash tickets won prizes). The “bonus number” feature was also dropped in favor of the current format. After so many years, the Sunday drawings are returned.

=== Pick 3 ===
Pick 3 drawings are held twice daily Monday through Saturday at approximately 1:05 pm and 9:35 pm Mountain Time (MT). Tickets can be purchased until 1:00 pm (MT) for the Day Drawing and until 9:30 pm (MT) for the Evening Drawing. Tickets cost $1 per play per drawing. Prizes range from $5 to $500, depending on play type.

=== Lucky Numbers Bingo ===
Lucky Numbers Bingo drawings are held every 4 minutes. Tickets cost $2 per play per drawing. Prizes range from $1 to $10,000.

=== Quicksters ===
Red Hot Jackpot Bingo is an instant draw game in which the numbers to be matched are printed on the ticket itself. Tickets cost $5 per play per drawing. The jackpot starts at $1,000 and grows until won.

==== Former draw games ====
4 This Way! ended in 2007. It was a pick-4 game; however, players won by matching the last digit. Prizes ranged from $1 for the last digit to $4,000 for matching all four.

== Multi-state games ==
=== Hot Lotto ===
Hot Lotto is available in 14 states. Drawings are Wednesday and Saturday nights. The game draws five "white balls" numbered 1 through 47 and an orange "Hot Ball" numbered 1 through 19. The jackpot begins at $1,000,000 (all-cash and "taxes-paid"), with minimum rollovers of $50,000. Hot Lotto, whose basic game is $1 per play, has a $2-per-game option called Sizzler; it triples non-jackpot prizes.

Hot Lotto's only format change was in May 2013. Eight "white balls" were added; jackpot winners no longer could choose annuity.

Hot Lotto's final drawing will be held October 28, 2017 (the same day as the Mega Millions format change); it will be replaced by a new version of Lotto*America on November 12, 2017.

=== Mega Millions ===
On October 27, 2009, a special meeting was held by the New Mexico Lottery Board of Directors in which it voted in favor of adding Mega Millions to the Lottery's portfolio. New Mexico joined Mega Millions on January 31, 2010, the official cross-selling date. Mega Millions is available in 44 states, the District of Columbia, and the U.S. Virgin Islands.

Drawings are on Tuesdays and Fridays at 9:00 pm Mountain Time (the numbers are drawn in Atlanta.) Tickets cost $1 per play per drawing and can be purchased until 8:45 pm Mountain Time for that night's drawing. The jackpot starts at $15 million and grows until won. The advertised jackpot/grand prize is an estimated amount which is paid as a 30-payment graduated annuity (5 percent yearly) or, at the election of the winner, in a single lump sum payment of the cash value of the annuity jackpot/grand prize (subject to state and Federal taxes.) Players can multiply a non-jackpot prize by adding the Megaplier for $1 more per play per drawing.

Mega Millions (which began in 1996 as the six-state The Big Game) will undergo the latest of several format changes on October 28, 2017, which includes a $2 base play ($3 with the Megaplier).

=== Powerball ===
Powerball jackpots begin at $40 million. Drawings are Wednesdays and Saturdays at 8:59 pm Mountain Time. Tickets cost $2 per play and can be purchased until 8:00 pm Mountain Time for that night's drawing. Similar to Mega Millions' Megaplier option, Power Play can increase most prize levels. Jackpots are advertised, and paid out, similar to in Mega Millions.

== Scratch off games ==
NM Lottery Scratchers includes a wide variety of instant win games.

== Lottery scholarship ==
New Mexico is one of eight states that funds college scholarships through its state lottery. The state of New Mexico requires that the lottery put 30% of its gross sales into the scholarship fund. The scholarship is available to residents who graduated from a state high school, and attend a state university full-time while maintaining a 2.5 GPA or higher. It covered 100% of tuition when it was first instated in 1996, decreased to 90%, then dropped to 60% in 2017. In 2018 the value has slightly increased, and new legislation has been passed to outline what funds are available per type of institution.
