= Idaho Lottery =

American state lottery of Idaho

- Logo
- Formation: July 19, 1989; 37 years ago
- Key people: Andrew Arulanandam

The Idaho Lottery began play on July 19, 1989, and is run by the government of the state of Idaho. It is a member of the Multi-State Lottery Association (MUSL). Fifty percent of all net funds is given to public schools, while the remainder is pledged to the Permanent Building Fund, which is used as a financial resource for the state's colleges and universities.

The Idaho Lottery offers the multi-state draw games Mega Millions, Powerball, Lucky for Life, and Lotto America along with state-operated daily games. The minimum age to play the Idaho Lottery is 18.

The Lottery also offers approximately 50 scratchcards yearly. Price points range from $1 to $30. Pull-tabs are offered in social settings, such as restaurants, bars, and bowling centers; its price points are 25 cents to one dollar.

== History ==
The Idaho Supreme Court handed down a decision in late 1953 that eliminated all forms of casino gaming in the state, most notably slot machines.

Nearly three decades later In January 1983, a proposal for a state lottery was defeated quickly in committee in the Idaho Legislature. Almost four years later, the lottery initiative was approved by voters in November 1986, but was declared unconstitutional the following March by district judge Gerald Schroeder, a future chief justice of the state supreme court. His decision was upheld 4–1 by the Idaho Supreme Court, and resulted in an amendment to the state constitution. Voters approved that in November 1988, and a mere 200 days later, a lottery industry record at the time, the Idaho Lottery began on July 19, 1989, with the scratch ticket Match 3 game.

Since its beginning, the Lottery has sold more than $1.8 billion in tickets and returned more than $437.3 million to Idaho public schools and buildings.

Three bordering states began lottery play in the 1980s, prior to Idaho's launch: Washington (1982), Oregon (1985), and Montana (1987). Wyoming began play in its lottery in 2014, while Nevada and Utah remain without. To the north in Canada, British Columbia also has lottery games.

== Draw games ==
=== In-state draw games ===
==== Pick 3 ====
Idaho Pick 3 is a twice-daily numbers game, drawn seven days a week; play styles and prizes vary.

==== Pick 4 ====
Idaho Pick 4 is also drawn twice a day, seven days a week; play styles and prizes vary.

==== Idaho Cash ====
Idaho Cash is a daily pick 5 game. A minimum of 2 plays must be played for $1. The starting jackpot prize is $20,000, and rolls until there is one or more winners. For each play, the player picks any five numbers from 1 to 45. Players matching 4 of 5 numbers win $200, matching 3 of 5 numbers wins $5, and matching 2 of 5 numbers wins a free ticket for the next draw. The odds for the jackpot are 1:610,879.5, and the overall odds of winning a prize are 1:5.7. The draw takes place on every night at 8:00 p.m. MT. Originally the game was twice-weekly, drawn on Wednesdays and Saturdays, before July 16, 2021.

=== Multi-jurisdictional games ===
==== Lotto America ====
Lotto America replaced the multi-state Hot Lotto in October 2017. (Hot Lotto was unrelated to an Idaho-only game by that name.) Lotto America is available in 13 states, including Idaho.

==== Lucky for Life ====
Lucky for Life, which began as a Connecticut-only game in 2009 called Lucky4Life, became a regional game three years later. The top prize is $1000-per-day for life, and the second-prize is $25,000-per-year for life. Both "lifetime" prizes offer a cash option, which began in 2013.

On January 27, 2015, Lucky for Life added eight states, including Idaho. The game was modified to its current double matrix (5 of 48 white balls, and 1 of 18 green "Lucky Balls"); Ten states plus the District of Columbia have joined in addition.

The game retired on February 21, 2026, replaced by a new lifetime-prize game, Millionaire for Life.

==== Mega Millions ====
On January 31, 2010, Mega Millions and Powerball became available to lotteries which previously offered either game. Idaho joined Mega Millions on the above date, as part of the games' cross-sell expansion. Mega Millions is drawn Tuesdays and Fridays; its games are $5 each, and include the Megaplier. Mega Millions' minimum jackpot is $40 million, paid in 30 graduated yearly installments unless the cash option is chosen.

Mega Millions is offered in 44 states, the District of Columbia, and the U.S. Virgin Islands.

==== Powerball ====
Idaho has been a member of MUSL since 1990. Powerball began in 1992; its cash option began in 1997, and Power Play was added in 2001. The current version of Powerball began on January 15, 2012. Games are $3 each and automatically includes Power Play. The game is drawn Mondays, Wednesdays and Saturdays; Powerball jackpots begin at $20 million.

=== 2by2 ===
2by2 is a drawn nightly double-matrix game, where the player picks 2 numbers from 1–26 on each number field(red and white). The top prize is $22,000, which is won by matching all 2 red and 2 white numbers. Players who buy a ticket good for seven consecutive drawings are eligible for a doubling of the top prize to $44,000 if the top prize is won on a Tuesday. Idaho ended the participation of 2by2 on August 26, 2022.

==== Weekly Grand ====
Weekly Grand was drawn daily (previously twice a week on Wednesdays and Saturdays) at 8:00 p.m. MT. The player selected five numbers from 1 to 32. Games were $2 each; the top prize was $1000 a week for a year, taxes paid. Players matching 4 of 5 numbers would win $200, matching 3 of 5 numbers would win $25, and matching 2 of 5 numbers would win a free ticket for the next draw. The odds for the top prize is 1:201,376, and the overall odds of winning a prize is 1:6.12. Non-winning tickets could be entered in a monthly raffle for $100 a week. The "second chance" drawings were controversial; if a potential winner was disqualified, the $100-per-week prize was not paid. Weekly Grand did not offer a cash option, and was a rare example of a pick-5 game with an annuitized prize, as well as an increasingly rare example of any lottery game without a cash option.

==== 5 Star Draw ====
5 Star Draw was a twice-weekly game. A minimum of 2 play were played for $5. The starting jackpot prize was $250,000, and rolled until there is one or more winners. For each play, the player picked any five numbers from 1 to 45. Players matching 4 of 5 numbers win $200, matching 3 of 5 numbers win $5, and matching 2 of 5 numbers win a free ticket for the next draw. The odds for the jackpot is 1:610,879.5, and the overall odds of winning a prize is 1:6. The draws took place on every Tuesday and Friday at 8:00 p.m. MT. It was retired on April 4, 2025.

== 2009 fiscal year ==
In FY 2009, the Idaho Lottery set a sales record on the way to grossing nearly $140 million. It also set a dividend record by returning a profit of $35 million to the people of Idaho, the sixth consecutive year for returning a record dividend. Players won a record $84.9 million in prizes, and retailers received a record $8.3 million in commissions.

FY 2009 sales by product were:

Game	Revenues ($)
Powerball	36,787,378
Hot Lotto§	4,132,812
Wild Card	3,152,691
Idaho Pick 3	1,883,839
Double Play Daily	360,806
Idaho $1,000,000 Raffle	2,500,000
Instant Scratch Tickets	88,425,049
Pulltabs	2,406,606
Total Sales	139,649,181

== Where the money goes ==
The largest share of Idaho Lottery dollars is returned to players in the form of prizes. This amount in FY 2009 was approximately 60%. The next largest share of revenue is the annual dividend, which by statute is split equally between Idaho's public schools and permanent buildings, including college campuses. Approximately 25% of all Idaho Lottery revenue was returned to the people of Idaho in FY 2009. The approximately 900 Idaho Lottery retailers received 6% of all revenue while game support utilizes 4%, administration costs were 3% and the smallest portion, 2%, was used for advertising.

== Technology ==
The Idaho Lottery changed the on-line provider to INTRALOT, USA in February 2007. This required the installation of satellites and terminals across Idaho. The new terminals and software capabilities allow the Lottery to perform specialized and unique game promotions.

The Lottery also changed its instant ticket vendor to Scientific Games, Inc. in July 2007. This combination of companies has allowed the Lottery to offer unique game promotions where players have the opportunity to enter second-chance draws through either the internet or via tele-entry using a regular touch-tone telephone.

In July 2007, the Lottery debuted a North American industry first when it offered their VIP Club members the opportunity to earn rewards for making game purchases (excluding instant ticket). For each $1 spent on draw game tickets, players receive one point. Points may be redeemed through the Lottery's VIP Club website for merchandise.

In August 2008, the Lottery offered another North American first – the ability for players to donate part of their winnings from scratch tickets to an international non-profit organization. The Lottery offered a $1 scratch game to help financially support the 2009 Special Olympic World Winter Games to be held in Idaho that February. Using creative game technology, winning players were asked to donate 25%, 50% or 100% of their win to support the international event.

== Mascot ==
The unofficial mascot of the Idaho Lottery is "BALL", a large, life-sized symbol of the red Powerball. "BALL" boasts a circumference of 132 inches and made its debut in television commercials in 2006. The Powerball commercials featuring "BALL" won critical acclaim from the Northwest Addy Awards with a Best of Show Award. The commercial campaign depicted "BALL" being so huge it could not fit through revolving doors, into elevators, or up escalators. More recently, "BALL" made appearances at special events and community venues such as collegiate and professional sporting events.
