= Delaware Lottery =

U.S. state lottery

- Delaware Lottery logo
- Type: Lottery System
- Headquarters: McKee Business Park; 1575 McKee Road; Dover, Delaware 19904
- Website: www.delottery.com

The Delaware Lottery is run by the government of Delaware. Its creation was authorized by the state legislature on May 31, 1974. Its "traditional" games include Play 3, Play 4, Multi-Win Lotto, Lucky For Life, Lotto America, Mega Millions, and Powerball. Delaware also offers Keno, sports betting, and video lottery.

Prior to 2018, Delaware was one of only four jurisdictions where wagering on sports was legal under federal law, although it had not permitted such betting since a game based on final scores in the National Football League (NFL) was available for only the 1976 season. However, a bill was signed by the Governor of Delaware in May 2009 that is much broader than the previous sports wagering law. (The other US jurisdictions exempted from the federal ban on sports gambling under the Professional & Amateur Sports Protection Act were Montana, Nevada, and Oregon.) In August 2009, a federal court limited sports gambling in Delaware to NFL parlays, based on what Delaware had offered prior to 1992. On June 5, 2018, after the Supreme Court ruled PASPA unconstitutional, the Delaware Lottery expanded sports betting to include additional sports and single-game bets.

In January 2010, legislation was passed legalizing Lottery-owned table games at Delaware's three racetrack casinos ("racinos".)

The minimum age to play the Delaware Lottery is 18, except for video lottery and sports betting, which have a minimum age of 21. As Delaware's liquor stores do not allow underage persons in them, the minimum age to purchase tickets in such establishments is effectively 21.

== Sports Pick ==
Sports Pick is the brand name for sports betting offered by the Delaware Lottery. Prior to 2018, the Delaware Lottery offered limited sports betting consisting of parlay betting and championship futures on National Football League (NFL) only; betting was available at casino sportsbooks and at retailers throughout the state. Delaware had made a failed attempt to legalized sports betting in 1976 and received a partial exemption from a federal ban on sports betting under the Professional & Amateur Sports Protection Act in 1992. On May 14, 2018, the U.S. Supreme Court struck down the ban on sports betting in the case Murphy v. National Collegiate Athletic Association. On June 5, 2018, the Delaware Lottery expanded sports betting to single-game and championship wagers on professional and college sports (excluding Delaware college teams) including football, baseball, basketball, hockey, soccer, boxing/MMA, golf, and auto racing. The expanded sports betting is available at the state's three casinos – Casino at Delaware Park, Dover Downs, and Harrington Raceway & Casino. Parlay betting on NFL and college football games (excluding Delaware teams) is available at retailers throughout the state.

Parlay Betting:

Regular season:

- Half-point parlays
- Teasers (6 points)
- Super Teasers (10 points)
- Reverse Teasers (-7 points)
- $100,000 Parlay Card
- Future book wagering

All spreads on Half-point parlays, Teasers, SuperTeasers, and Reverse Teasers have half point spreads to eliminate ties. $100,000 Parlay Card has integer spreads and ties lose.

Postseason:

- Half-point parlays
- Teasers (6 points)
- Reverse Teasers (-7 points)
- Playoff Special cards
- Future book wagering

== Current draw games ==
=== In-house draw games ===
==== Play 3, Play 4 and Play 5 ====
Play 3, Play 4 and Play 5 are drawn twice a day. Play 3 draws a 3 digit number from 000 to 999, Play 4 draws a 4 digit number from 0000 to 9999 and play 5 draws a 5 digit number from 00000 to 99999.

==== Multi-Win Lotto ====
Multi-Win lotto is played daily. Cash jackpots begin at $50,000 and roll over until they are won. Six numbers from 1 through 35 are drawn. Each $2 game features 3 lines of play. In addition to winning in the "classic" way (matching in any six-number play), prizes also are won by matching enough of the 18 numbers across the three lines to the six numbers drawn; "combined play" also wins if none of the 18 match the numbers drawn.

==== Keno ====
Delaware Keno is a keno game drawn every few minutes that began in January 2013 in 81 businesses.

=== Multi-state draw games ===
==== Lotto America ====
Lotto America is available through 13 lotteries, including Delaware's, and is drawn Wednesdays and Saturdays. Lotto America draws five white numbers from 1 through 52, and a "Star Ball", numbered 1 through 10. The jackpots begin at $2,000,000. Lotto America also has an option called All-Star Bonus that multiplies non-jackpot prizes by 2, 3, 4, or 5.

==== Lucky For Life ====
In January 2015, Delaware began selling Lucky For Life, a lesser multi-state game with a $2 price. The game offers a top prize of $1,000 a day for life. Second prize is $25,000 a year for life. The game had only been available for people in the six New England states until January 27, 2015. Drawings will take place on Monday and Thursday evenings. Those drawings will be conducted by the Connecticut Lottery. The game was suspended in February 2026 and was replaced by millionaire for life, which the Delaware lottery didn't join due to its high ticket cost.

==== Mega Millions ====
On October 13, 2009 the Mega Millions consortium and MUSL reached an agreement in principle to cross-sell Mega Millions and Powerball in US lottery jurisdictions. The Delaware Lottery added Mega Millions on the date of the cross-selling expansion, January 31, 2010. Mega Millions' jackpots currently start at $40 million (temporarily reduced to $20 million); it is drawn Tuesday and Friday nights.

==== Powerball ====
Since 1991, Delaware has been a member of MUSL. Powerball began in 1992. Powerball's jackpots currently start at $40 million (temporarily reduced to $20 million); it is drawn Monday, Wednesday, and Saturday nights.

== Former in-state draw games ==
=== Delaware Cash 5 ===
Delaware Cash 5 was a 5-number game, were introduced on February 2nd, 2011. Players chose 5 numbers from 1 to 33. The minimum Jackpot prize was $25,000, and if it was not won, it keeps rolling, until there is/are a jackpot winner(s). Players won by matching 2($1), 3($5), 4($100), or all 5 numbers in any order. There was also a Doubler number, from 1 to 7. If the player matched the Doubler number drawn, all non-jackpot prizes will be doubled. Drawings were held every Tuesday & Saturday nights. The game was suspended on January 24th, 2015, and replaced by the Multi-State game, Lucky For Life.

== Former multi-state draw games ==
=== Hot Lotto ===
Hot Lotto was available through 15 lotteries, including Delaware's, and was drawn Wednesdays and Saturdays. Hot Lotto drew five white numbers from 1 through 47, and an orange "Hot Ball", numbered 1 through 19. The jackpots began at $1,000,000 (all-cash, and "taxes-paid"), increasing by at least $50,000 if there is no top prize winner. Hot Lotto also had an option, called Sizzler (similar to Powerball's PowerPlay); the Sizzler tripled non-jackpot prizes.

The Hot Lotto game underwent a major change on May 12, 2013. Eight "white balls" were added, although the "Hot Ball" field remained at 19 numbers. The top prize changed from annuity-with-a-cash-option to will all-cash, and "taxes paid" (jackpot amounts reflect the net amount to be won, rather than the gross.) Hot Lotto had its last drawing on October 28, 2017.

== Video lottery ==
Delaware has three lottery-sponsored casinos – Casino at Delaware Park, Dover Downs, and Harrington Raceway & Casino – whose games include MUSL's MegaHits.
