= Hot Lotto fraud scandal =

Lottery-rigging scandal in the United States

The Hot Lotto fraud scandal was a lottery-rigging scandal in the United States. It came to light in 2017, after Eddie Raymond Tipton (born 1963), the former information security director of the Multi-State Lottery Association (MUSL), confessed to rigging a random number generator that he and two others used in multiple cases of fraud against state lotteries. Tipton was first convicted in October 2015 of rigging a $14.3 million drawing of MUSL's lottery game Hot Lotto. Eddie Tipton ultimately confessed to rigging lottery drawings in Iowa, Colorado, Wisconsin, Kansas, and Oklahoma. Also involved in the scheme were his brother and former Texas justice of the peace Tommy Tipton, and Texas businessman Robert Rhodes. Eddie Tipton was sentenced to 25 years in prison. He was released on parole in 2022 after serving five years.

A $14.3 million prize for the Hot Lotto draw on December 29, 2010, had been left unclaimed for nearly a year. When attempts were finally made to claim the prize on behalf of an anonymous off-shore trust company in Belize, the claim was rejected by the Iowa Lottery because it was made anonymously. A subsequent investigation into the trust and the discovery of surveillance footage from a convenience store that depicted the ticket being purchased led to the arrest of Eddie Tipton on two counts of fraud for attempting to illegally participate in a lottery game as an employee of the MUSL, and then trying to claim a prize through fraudulent means.

When his trial began on April 13, 2015, evidence was introduced by the prosecutors to support allegations that Tipton had rigged the draw in question by using his privileged access to an MUSL facility to install a rootkit on the computer containing Hot Lotto's random number generator, and then attempting to claim a winning ticket with the rigged numbers anonymously. On July 20, 2015, Tipton was found guilty on both counts; he was sentenced to 10 years' imprisonment, pending an appeal.

Eddie Tipton and his brother Tommy Boyd Tipton were subsequently accused of rigging other lottery drawings, dating back as far as 2005. Based on forensic examination of the random number generator that had been used in a 2007 Wisconsin lottery incident, investigators discovered that Eddie Tipton programmed a lottery random number generator to produce special results if the lottery numbers were drawn on certain days of the year.

The Iowa Lottery and MUSL were also sued by a subsequent winner of a Hot Lotto drawing who sought to have his winnings retroactively increased because the jackpot had been illegitimately reset by Tipton's rigged win. He settled with MUSL for an undisclosed amount on the eve of trial in 2019, but a memo from 2015 was revealed during discovery that showed that MUSL's security officers lacked confidence in the random number generation process and recommended that some of the games be suspended.

Hot Lotto held its final drawing on October 28, 2017; the game was replaced by Lotto America in November 2017.

== Investigation ==
The December 29, 2010, drawing of the multi-state lottery game Hot Lotto featured an advertised top prize of US$16.5 million. On November 9, 2011, Philip Johnston, a resident of Quebec City, Canada, phoned the Iowa Lottery to claim a ticket that had won the jackpot; stating he was too sick to claim the prize in person, he provided a 15-digit code that verified the winning ticket. However, Johnston's prize claim was turned down when he was unable to answer questions that verified he was the owner of the ticket. On December 6, Johnston phoned again, stating the ticket was actually owned by an anonymous individual who was being represented by a Belize-based shell company, Hexham Investments Trust. However, Iowa Lottery rules forbid anonymous prize claims, so the claim was turned down.

On December 29, 2011, less than two hours before the expiration of a one-year deadline for prize claims, representatives of a Des Moines law firm presented the winning ticket at the Iowa Lottery headquarters, signed on behalf of Hexham Investments and New York City–based attorney Crawford Shaw. However, Hexham was misspelled on the ticket as "Hexam", and the claim was, once again, turned down. On January 12, 2012, Shaw met with Iowa Lottery officials in person to try claiming the prize, but was turned down yet again after he refused to identify the owners of the trust. Shaw withdrew his claims over the prize afterward, and the prize money was returned to Hot Lotto's member lotteries in February 2011.

In an interview with Iowa's Division of Criminal Investigation, Johnston (who was listed as Hexham's president) explained that Robert Rhodes and Robert Sonfield of Sugar Land, Texas, with whom Johnston had professional relations, had asked him to assist in anonymously claiming the prize. The Daily Beast reported that Rhodes and Sonfield were, according to an anonymous source, in active litigation over a pump and dump scam, and that Rhodes, Sonfield, and Johnston had also had past business relationships.

In October 2014, investigators released surveillance footage from a Des Moines convenience store which they believed showed the purchaser of the ticket. He was later identified as Eddie Raymond Tipton, the director of information security at the Multi-State Lottery Association (MUSL), which organizes the Hot Lotto game. As an MUSL employee, it was illegal under Iowa law for Tipton to participate in any lottery game. On January 15, 2015, he was arrested and charged with two counts of fraud for attempting to illegally participate in the lottery, and attempting to use fraudulent means to claim prizes. Rhodes, a previous co-worker of Tipton's, was in Des Moines when Tipton purchased the ticket, and the two were in frequent contact by phone. Tipton claimed he was visiting family in his hometown of Houston at the time of the suspicious purchase, but witnesses matched the buyer's mannerisms and Texas-accented voice to him. Rhodes was arrested on two counts of fraud in March 2015.

== Trial ==
Tipton's trial began on April 13, 2015. Alongside the suspicious manner that Tipton had allegedly attempted to claim the ticket, prosecutors suggested that he had rigged the Hot Lotto draw on December 29, 2010, so that the "drawn" numbers would match the ticket.

Hot Lotto draws are conducted using a random number generator running on a computer in MUSL's Des Moines facility. The computer is in a "locked glass-walled room accessible only by two people at a time and then only on camera", and is not connected to the Internet or any other networks. Tipton was let into the room on November 20, 2010, to manually adjust the time on the draw computer to reflect daylight saving time; it was alleged that while Tipton was in the room, he used a USB flash drive to install self-destructing malware on the random number generator computer, presumably to rig a draw. Tipton's co-workers described him as having been "obsessed" with rootkits at the time. It was also noted that on that day, security cameras were configured to record only for "roughly one second per minute", a change the prosecutors believed was made to prevent anything suspicious from being recorded.

In an April 13, 2015, statement, Iowa Lottery CEO Terry Rich explained that MUSL had implemented stronger security measures to protect the integrity of its draws, including new equipment and software to conduct the drawing, updated security protocols for the draw room, new security cameras, and further separation of duties. Tipton's defense attorney, Nicholas Sarcone, unsuccessfully attempted to block presentation of the hacking theory in court, arguing that Tipton was with multiple people in the draw room, as per protocol, and use of the convenience store surveillance footage, claiming that the person in the video could not have been Tipton because he did not have a beard at the time. The trial was recessed to July 2015 to give the defense time to analyze the new evidence.

In a brief issued on July 9, 2015, Sarcone wrote that following an examination, there was no evidence that Tipton had tampered with the draw computer, and that according to lottery officials, the cameras in the draw room had a long-term history of technical problems that could have resulted in the incomplete surveillance recording of Tipton's actions. In an interview with The Daily Beast, Tipton denied he was the person who purchased the ticket, and argued that he had been singled out because he was an employee of MUSL. He also noted that, aside from Rhodes, he had not been in active contact with or knew Sonfield, or any other individual alleged to have been involved in the fraud. In his closing arguments, Assistant Attorney General Rob Sand singled out two pieces of evidence as proof beyond a reasonable doubt of Tipton's guilt: firstly, co-workers and friends testified that the voice of the man on the surveillance recording matched Tipton's, and secondly, MUSL IT director Jason Maher testified that Tipton had access to a rootkit.

=== First conviction ===
On July 20, 2015, Tipton was found guilty on two counts of fraud. On September 9, he was sentenced to ten years' imprisonment but remained free on bond pending an appeal. Tipton's attorney argued that his client's conviction was based on "speculative" evidence.

In June 2017, the Iowa Supreme Court dismissed Tipton’s conviction on the tampering charge and vacated his conviction on the fraudulent redeeming charge, both due to the state exceeding the statute of limitations. However, by this time Tipton was already planning on pleading guilty to additional charges.

== Subsequent allegations ==
Lottery investigators uncovered three other instances in which they alleged Tipton rigged lottery outcomes.

- On November 23, 2005, Tipton's brother Tommy won a $568,990 jackpot prize share in a Colorado Lottery drawing. Eddie Tipton was among those who constructed Colorado's random number generator. A friend of Tommy Tipton claimed that Tommy asked him to claim the ticket in return for ten percent of the winnings.
- A December 29, 2007, prize of $783,257 in a Wisconsin Lottery drawing was paid to a limited liability corporation controlled by Robert Rhodes, who had also been charged in the 2010 Hot Lotto case. Records show that the corporation subsequently transferred money to Tipton.
- A November 23, 2011, Hot Lotto jackpot of $1.2 million was paid to Kyle Conn, an owner of a construction company in Texas. Conn bought the ticket from the Oklahoma Lottery. Oklahoma investigators were suspicious because Conn was not a frequent player, came from out of state, and specified the winning numbers manually instead of relying on a random pick. They initially declined to say what linked this case to Tipton.

Eddie Tipton faced criminal charges, filed October 9, 2015, related to the 2005 and 2007 allegations. Tommy Tipton was charged on March 30, 2016.

== Confession and second conviction ==
Forensic investigation of the random number generator used to pick the lottery numbers in the 2007 Megabucks drawing showed that it had been programmed to produce knowable outcomes if the drawing occurred on three dates of the year – May 27, November 23, and December 29 – provided these dates were Wednesdays or Saturdays and the drawing was after 8 p.m.

In January 2017, Rhodes pled guilty in Iowa to charges related to aiding Eddie Tipton in the 2010 Hot Lotto incident. In March 2017, he pled guilty to the 2007 Megabucks incident. As part of the plea bargain, Rhodes agreed to testify against Eddie and Tommy Tipton. He was sentenced to six months of house arrest and ordered to pay $409,000 in restitution.

In June 2017, Eddie Tipton confessed in court to having installed the rigged random number generator in 2005 or 2006. "I wrote software that included code that allowed me to technically predict winning numbers and I gave those numbers to other individuals who then won the lottery and shared those winnings with me," he said. He admitted to fixing lotteries in Colorado, Oklahoma, Wisconsin, and Kansas as well as Iowa. Tipton was sentenced to 25 years in prison, but his attorneys claimed he could be paroled in three or four years. Eddie and Tommy were also ordered to pay about $3 million in restitution.

Tommy Tipton served 75 days in jail in Texas, after pleading guilty in June 2017 to conspiracy to commit theft by deception.

Eddie Tipton was released on parole in July 2022 after serving five years. On January 20, 2022, Tipton had been approved for parole, but prior to release parole had been revoked for getting into a fight.

== Restitution avoided ==
As of 2019, Eddie and Tommy had largely avoided paying the over $2.3 million in restitution they owed to Oklahoma, Colorado, Kansas, and Wisconsin. Their payments to the four states totaled about $1,225. During the interim, Eddie and Tommy Tipton had transferred ownership of several properties to their mother, Lawanda Tipton.

== Counter-suit to overturn sentence ==
Tipton sued the state of Iowa in January 2020, claiming he was pressured four years ago to plead guilty to crimes he did not commit. The lawsuit sought to overturn his sentence. Assistant Attorney General William Hill asked a judge on November 4, 2021, to dismiss this lawsuit.

== Suit by later jackpot winner ==
On February 4, 2016, the Iowa Lottery and the MUSL were sued by Larry Dawson, who won a $6 million Hot Lotto jackpot several months after the rigged draw. Dawson claimed that because the MUSL had officially recognized an illegitimate draw as having a winning ticket, the following drawing's jackpot should not have been reset to $1 million and would have theoretically reached $16 million by the time of his winning draw. As such, Dawson claimed that, given the parties' failure in properly auditing their games, he was entitled to $10 million that was not officially awarded in the rigged draw. Iowa Lottery CEO Terry Rich criticized Dawson's lawsuit for its attempt to "rewrite history", stating that, "No one can know what would have occurred in this case had any event in it been changed. We believe that Mr. Dawson rightfully was paid the jackpot to which he was entitled." Dawson later received a $1.5 million settlement from MUSL.

The jackpot from the rigged 2010 draw was ultimately not claimed and distributed among the sixteen states participating in the lottery.

== In popular culture ==
On January 7, 2018, episode #1 of the podcast Swindled covered the incident.

On January 28, 2018, GSN aired a documentary about the Hot Lotto fraud scandal called Cover Story: The Notorious Lottery Heist.

In September 2018 an episode of American Greed documented the incident.

In March 2021 episode #160 of the podcast Criminal covered the incident.

In April 2025 the documentary Jackpot: America's Biggest Lotto Scam produced by AMS Pictures, covered the case.

== See also ==
- 1980 Pennsylvania Lottery scandal
