= Lotto America =

American Lottery

- Region: United States (14 states and the District of Columbia)
- First draw: November 12, 2017
- Operator: Multi-State Lottery Association
- Highest jackpot: $40.03 million (April 1, 2023)
- Odds of winning jackpot: 1 in 25,989,600
- Website: www.powerball.com/lotto-america

Lotto America is an American multi-jurisdictional lottery drawing game operated by the Multi-State Lottery Association (MUSL), which was created as a revival of the original Lotto America that operated from 1988 to 1992. Both incarnations (as with the present version’s direct predecessor) were created to provide a progressive mid-sized jackpot drawing for state lotteries that do not offer their own similar in-house “lotto” games. As of 2026, Lotto America, which conducts its drawings using a random number generator (RNG) selection, is currently offered in 14 states and the District of Columbia.

The second incarnation of Lotto America was launched by 12 state lotteries on November 12, 2017, as a replacement for the scandal-tarred Hot Lotto game; each of the original members of this version of Lotto America previously offered Hot Lotto at the time that game was discontinued on October 28, 2017.

== Original Lotto America (1988–1992) ==
The original version of Lotto America held its first drawing on February 13, 1988. The game was a $1-per-play, pick-7-of-40 game, rather than the pick-6 games that had become wildly popular in U.S. lotteries. Matching four numbers won a fixed prize of $5; matching at least five won a parimutuel prize. Matching all seven won the jackpot, whose odds were roughly 1 in 18 million, at the time the longest odds of a U.S. lottery game. The top prize was a 20-year annuity; there was never a cash option, even though a few games did offer one when Lotto America ended.

During the middle of its four-year run, Lotto America became a more traditional pick-6-of-54 game; unlike the first version, players got two games for $1. The jackpot odds actually became more favorable at 1 in 13 million per dollar; however, overall odds were much tougher, since four numbers were still needed to win the lowest prize tier. This version was entirely parimutuel.

In some of its jurisdictions, Lotto America was known by a different, "more local" name. For instance, in Minnesota, it was called Lotto Minnesota.

Several states joined the Multi-State Lottery Association during the era of Lotto America. One of them, Maine, decided to leave the Multi-State Lottery Association when Lotto America ended; Maine did not rejoin the Multi-State Lottery Association until 2004.

The Multi-State Lottery Associations' rapidly growing population base resulted in the replacement of Lotto America in April 1992 with Powerball.

=== Original members (1988–1992) ===
Members	Joined	Additional notes
Delaware	January 1991	
District of Columbia §	February 1988	
Idaho	February 1990	
Indiana	October 1990	
Iowa §	February 1988	
Kansas §	February 1988	
Kentucky	January 1991	
Maine	July 1990	Was the only original member not to continue with the game when it became Powerball in April 1992.
Minnesota	August 1990	
Missouri §	February 1988	
Montana	November 1989	
Oregon §	February 1988	
Rhode Island §	February 1988	
South Dakota	November 1990	
West Virginia §	February 1988	
Wisconsin	August 1989	

§ One of the founding members of the Multi-State Lottery Association composed the original lineup for Lotto America.

== 2017 revival ==
Due to declining sales for the game in the wake of a fraud scandal, the MUSL discontinued Hot Lotto, holding its final drawing on October 28, 2017. Replacing it was a new version of Lotto America that commenced ticket sales on November 12, 2017; the game’s first drawing was held three days later on November 15. Lotto America was initially available in 12 of the 13 states that offered Hot Lotto at the time it concluded play, except New Hampshire, which elected not to transition to the successor game. Nebraska became the first state to join Lotto America post-inception on May 19, 2024; Mississippi subsequently joined on May 12, 2024, eventually followed by the District of Columbia on October 5, 2025.

Lotto America is drawn on Monday, Wednesday and Saturday nights before 10:15 p.m. Eastern Time. (Drawings were originally held on Wednesdays and Saturdays, with Monday drawings being added on July 18, 2022.) For each $1 play, bettors choose five numbers from 1 through 52, and a "star ball" numbered from 1 through 10, or ask for terminal-generated numbers. For an additional $1 per play, the bettor can add the "All-Star Bonus" option, which multiplies non-jackpot prizes by 2, 3, 4, or 5. Lotto America’s progressive jackpot starts at $2 million; however, the game's initial jackpot was $15 million; the 13 members chose to augment the jackpot with funds from Hot Lotto, whose final jackpot was not won.

While Hot Lotto used a random number generator during most of its run (including the December 2010 drawing whose jackpot was "won" by Eddie Tipton, a MUSL employee), Lotto America is believed to be drawn in Tallahassee, Florida (even though the Florida Lottery does not offer the game), originally using physical ball machines and numbered balls; one machine drew the five main numbers while another was used to draw the "Star Ball". Lotto America began conducting drawings using a random number generator on April 17, 2023. As of April 2026, the drawings have never been made publicly available as a televised or streaming presentation; a computer-generated display of the drawings is shown on an unofficial website. This traditional draw setup is in stark contrast to Hungary's Putto game, where draws take place every five minutes and results are displayed in real time.

=== Members ===
Members	Joined
Delaware †	November 12, 2017
District of Columbia	October 5, 2025
Idaho †	November 12, 2017
Iowa †	November 12, 2017
Kansas †	November 12, 2017
Maine †	November 12, 2017
Minnesota †	November 12, 2017
Mississippi	May 12, 2024
Montana †	November 12, 2017
Nebraska	May 19, 2024
North Dakota †	November 12, 2017
Oklahoma †	November 12, 2017
South Dakota †	November 12, 2017
Tennessee †	November 12, 2017
West Virginia †	November 12, 2017

- † Member lottery that was previously a Hot Lotto participant when that game was discontinued on October 28, 2017.
