= West Virginia Lottery =

West Virginia state-operated gambling agency

- Region: West Virginia
- First draw: 9 January 1986
- Number of games: Daily 3; Daily 4; Cash 25; Powerball; Mega Millions; Lotto America
- Website: wvlottery.com

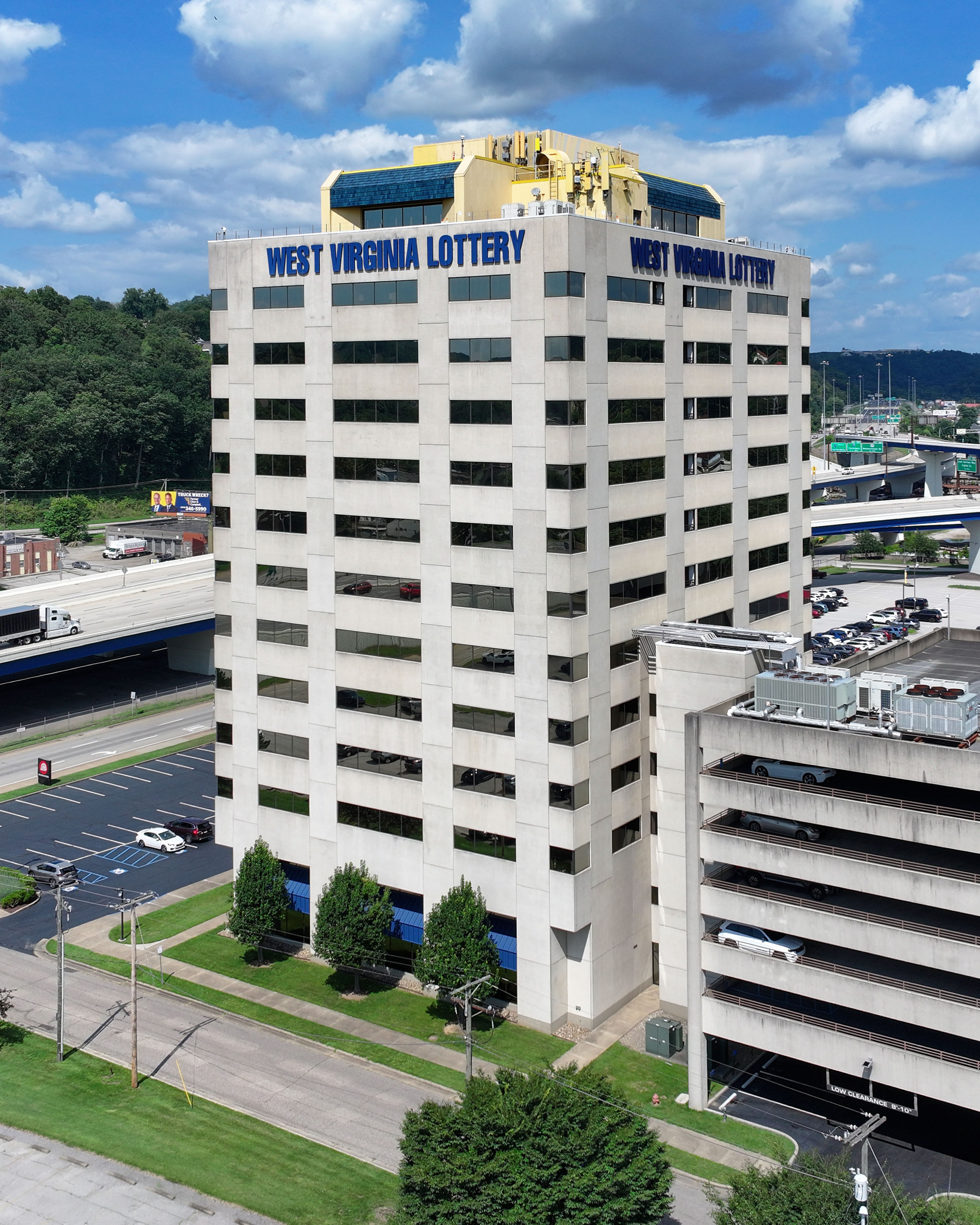
West Virginia Lottery headquarters at 900 Pennsylvania Avenue in Charleston, West Virginia

The West Virginia Lottery is run by the government of West Virginia. It was established in 1984 via a voter referendum. It is a charter member of the Multi-State Lottery Association (MUSL). The Lottery offers games such as Lotto America, Powerball, Mega Millions, and scratch tickets. West Virginia has reinterpreted the amendment to its Constitution that permitted its lottery to include casinos, and thus the West Virginia Lottery Commission also regulates slot machines, which are marketed as "video lottery" and available at several hundred businesses; and five "lottery table games" casinos.

Jack Whittaker, arguably the most notable American lottery winner, won his then-record Powerball jackpot of about $315 million (annuity value) on a ticket bought in West Virginia for the December 25, 2002 drawing.

The minimum age to buy West Virginia Lottery tickets is 18, while casinos and slot machine parlors require patrons to be at least 21. The lottery has the lowest payoff of any state lottery system in the country, returning on average a 15% share to winners.

In March 2018, West Virginia passed the WV Sports Lottery Wagering Act, which legalizes sports betting in the state, pending a decision from the Supreme Court allowing states to offer sports betting. The West Virginia Lottery Commission would regulate the new industry, and has stated that casinos could be ready to launch sports betting as early as 90 days after a Supreme Court decision.

== Current draw games ==
=== In-house draw games ===
==== Daily 3 ====
Daily 3 is drawn Mondays through Saturdays. It draws three sets of balls numbered 0 through 9. Prices, prizes, and options vary.

==== Daily 4 ====
Daily 4 is similar to Daily 3, except four ball sets are used.

==== Cash 25 ====
Cash 25 is drawn Mondays, Tuesdays, Thursdays, and Fridays. It draws six numbers from 1 through 25. The top prize is $25,000; games cost $1.

=== Multi-jurisdictional games ===
==== Powerball ====
Since 1988, West Virginia has been a member of MUSL; Powerball began in 1992. Powerball's jackpots begin at $40 million; it is drawn Wednesday and Saturday nights. Monday drawings were added August, 2021.

==== Mega Millions ====
On September 6, 1996, six lotteries began a multi-jurisdictional game, then known as The Big Game. In May 1999, the New Jersey Lottery became its first additional member. The game became known as The Big Game Mega Millions in May 2002; a short time later, The Big Game was dropped from the name. Mega Millions' starting jackpots is $40 million, a cash option is available.

On January 31, 2010, many MUSL members (until then offering only Powerball) joined Mega Millions; likewise, most Mega Millions members added Powerball, New Jersey offered both games as of the cross-sell expansion date.

The Megaplier option, initially available only in Texas, became available to Mega Millions players in New Jersey during January 2011, the deadline for the then 43 Mega Millions members to offer the Megaplier.

Mega Millions currently is played in 44 states, the District of Columbia, and the U.S. Virgin Islands.

Mega Millions is drawn live, usually from Atlanta.

==== Lotto America ====
The West Virginia Lottery is one of 13 lotteries offering Lotto America, which started on November 15, 2017. The minimum jackpot for Lotto America is $2 million and drawings are held on Monday, Wednesday and Saturday nights.

=== Former ===
==== Hot Lotto ====
Hot Lotto began ticket sales on April 7, 2002 with West Virginia as one of its six original lotteries. It was available in a total of 14 states. It was drawn Wednesdays and Saturdays. Hot Lotto was the only game in West Virginia where the numbers were drawn via RNG (other than its keno and video slot machines). Five "white numbers" from 1 through 47 were drawn, followed by the "orange Hot Ball" numbered 1-19. Jackpots started at $1,000,000 (all-cash, and "taxes paid") with a $50,000 minimum rollovers. The Sizzler option tripled non-jackpot prizes.

The only major format change (other than the game's switch in 2006 to computerized drawings) was in 2013. The game concluded on October 28, 2017.

== See also ==
- Gambling
- Lotteries in the United States
