= Wisconsin Lottery =

State lottery of Wisconsin, United States

- Region: State of Wisconsin
- Operator: Wisconsin Department of Revenue
- Regulated by: Wisconsin Department of Revenue
- Number of games: 8 lotto games
- Shown on: Previously aired on ABC-affiliated stations statewide until 2002
- Website: wilottery.com

The Wisconsin Lottery is run by the Wisconsin Department of Revenue and was authorized in 1988 by the state legislature. It is a member of the Multi-State Lottery Association (MUSL). Its games consist of Mega Millions, Powerball, Megabucks, Supercash!, Badger 5, Pick 3, Pick 4, All or Nothing, and scratch games. Since its founding, it has generated $4.6 billion for property tax relief for state residents.

The minimum age to buy Wisconsin Lottery tickets is 18.

== Televised history ==
=== The Money Game ===
Until 2003, a game show produced by the Wisconsin Lottery and Hearst-Argyle Television, called Wisconsin Lottery Money Game, was aired weekly on the Lottery's network of stations. Contestants won a chance to play the game (and $100) if a scratch ticket contained three "TV" symbols; if not chosen for the main game, would win at least $500 from a pool of money split between them and the other 54 players not chosen. Five contestants would play the game, consisting of four or five rounds where they would choose cash prizes hidden behind the letters Wisconsin Lottery Moneygame, which were set up in the style of the Wheel of Fortune gameboard, but with reversed play. Here, contestants hit a plunger to light up one of the word rows, then picked one letter in that word. The letter was turned over to reveal the prize, which in the last round was a maximum of $7,500; there were no letters with penalties where money was taken away. The winner of the main game went to the bonus round, where they spun a wheel which had alternating values of $25,000 and $50,000. During the show, new instant games were showcased, along with lottery news, and a second-chance drawing of losing mailed-in tickets (instant and online) was conducted.

The program was taped at WISN-TV in Milwaukee. All contestants (each could bring a guest 18 or older) living outside of the Milwaukee area received a two-night stay at the Grand Milwaukee Hotel (later the Four Points Sheraton-Mitchell Field, which closed at the end of 2012.) for their appearance. Hosts were Mark Johnson and Parker Drew; the show's hostesses were Mary Christine and Lori Minetti. The show's format was changed to a new version known as the Super Money Game in mid-2002, involving more contests with a smaller contestant pool, equivalent to a lower-cost version of the Hoosier Lottery's Hoosier Millionaire.

=== Television network ===
The Lottery television network consisted of the following stations from 1988 until 2002:

- WISN (12) - Milwaukee
- WKOW (27) - Madison
- WBAY (2) - Green Bay (converted from CBS to ABC in 1992)
- WXOW & WQOW (19/18) - La Crosse/Eau Claire
- WAOW/WYOW (9/34) - Wausau/Eagle River/Rhinelander
- KBJR (6) - Superior, Wisconsin/Duluth, Minnesota (the only non-ABC station to air the show)

WISN Radio (1130) in Milwaukee aired the drawings on radio until the station's 1997 sale from Hearst to Clear Channel Communications. Several Wisconsin stations picked up the audio portion of the television drawings, though most stations read the winning numbers from Associated Press releases from the Lottery on the mornings after the drawings, which also are published online, in newspapers throughout Wisconsin, USA Today, and the border areas of outlying states. Lottery results are also a common feature of the last segments in the state's late newscasts, and a feature of station news tickers.

=== Drawings ===
The Lottery joined the multi-jurisdictional Lotto*America game in 1989. Later, the Lottery began its Wisconsin's Very Own Megabucks jackpot drawings after the launch of Powerball (which replaced L*A) in 1992.

The Lottery's nightly drawings, starting in 1991 with the introduction of Supercash! (a $250,000 daily six-number game when it began), took place at WISN-TV. Employees who were not part of the station's news department, or employees of WISN Radio and WLTQ, which were owned by Hearst at the time and shared the WISN studios, drew the numbers. In 1993, the Lottery added a Pick 3 game, followed by Pick 4 in 1997. Other games were added by the Lottery, but were not always successful, such as MUSL's Daily Millions, which was infamous for having few winners of the $1 million cash prize, and having a complicated drawing procedure involving three number pools and various colored balls. Another MUSL game, Cash4Life (not to be confused with the current multi-state game by that name), which offered an annuitized prize of $1,000 per week for life (no cash option was available) with a first-prize win from a 99-ball pool; only four players won that game by its end in 1999. Neither WISN nor the Wisconsin Lottery network televised either game's drawings (held at 9:45pm) due to lack of popularity and their drawing time being during primetime. The Badger 5 game continues to this day; its play style is found in most U.S. lotteries.

The televised drawings and the Money Game were discontinued in late 2002, due to budget constraints and stations moving the show to lower-rated timeslots. The drawings were moved to Madison, where they are conducted around 9:30pm nightly at the Lottery's headquarters building using an air-gapped random number generator machine instead. The stations which were part of the Lottery network continue to receive first priority to release the nightly numbers. The Mega Millions and Powerball drawings now can be aired by any Wisconsin station, although they usually televise the drawings only for large jackpots. Until 2014, the Chicago cable channel WGN America also carried both drawings, as the channel is nearly universally available across the state of Wisconsin, though since then they have not been carried after the network's conversion to a general entertainment format.

On June 14, 2020, the Lottery began to draw Pick 3, Pick 4, and All or Nothing twice daily from Madison; the drawings occur at 1:30 p.m. and 9:00 p.m. CT daily, and are uploaded to the Lottery's YouTube channel shortly after the numbers are generated.

== Pre-Wisconsin Lottery ==
The federally recognized Oneida Nation of Wisconsin sold the first "modern" lottery tickets in the state in the 1980s at their reservation near Green Bay, Wisconsin. Before the Wisconsin Lottery began in 1988, some players who did not want to drive to Illinois tried their luck at stores on the reservation. The main game offered by the Oneida Nation was Big Green, which began as a pick-6-of-36 jackpot game.

The Oneida Nation also offered a televised bingo game program on Green Bay stations in the mid-to-late 1980s, which was in the form of a caller reading the numbers on the bottom of the screen, with the lighted number board on the top portion. Winners could redeem winning cards at the tribe's bingo hall. It has since established a full-service gaming casino, known as the Oneida Bingo & Casino, which includes hotel and conference facilities.

== Current lottery-offered online games ==
=== Pick 3 ===
Pick 3 is drawn twice daily. It began on September 21, 1992. Pick 3 draws three digits 0 through 9. Prizes and options vary.

=== Pick 4 ===
Pick 4 began on September 15, 1997 and is drawn twice daily. It draws a four-digit number in the style of Pick 3.

=== All or Nothing ===
All or Nothing is drawn twice daily. It draws 11 numbers from 1 through 22, with the top $100,000 prize being won by either matching all eleven numbers, or having none of the eleven drawn numbers; smaller prizes involve matching 1, 2, 3, 8, 9 or 10 numbers. Minimum play is $2, and the game launched on April 7, 2019.

=== Badger 5 ===
Badger 5 is drawn nightly. It draws 5 numbers from 1 through 31. Badger 5 jackpots begin at $10,000, increasing by at least $1,000 per drawing if not won. Games cost $1. Badger 5 began on February 17, 2003.

=== SuperCash! ===
SuperCash! also is nightly. It began on February 4, 1991. SuperCash! draws 6 numbers 1 through 39 (previously from 1 through 36). Players get 2 sets of numbers for each $1 game they play. an even number of games must be played. The top prize is $350,000; initially, the top prize was $250,000.

=== Wisconsin's Megabucks ===
Wisconsin's Megabucks (once known as "Wisconsin's Very Own Megabucks" to distinguish itself from the "local" name of Lotto*America), is drawn Wednesdays and Saturdays. It draws 6 numbers 1 through 49. Players get 2 sets of numbers for each $1 game they play.

There have been two incarnations of this game, the first incarnation beginning August 10, 1989 and being replaced by Powerball on April 19, 1992 (which was the year Lotto*America had its final drawing), and the second and current incarnation beginning two months later on June 18, 1992.

== Wisconsin's multi-state games ==
=== Mega Millions ===
Mega Millions began as The Big Game in 1996. Mega Millions was expanded in 2010 to include Wisconsin. Its starting jackpot is $40 million. In 2018 the biggest jackpot was $1.537 billion. Mega Millions is drawn Tuesday and Friday nights. Plays are $2 each, or $3 with the Megaplier.

=== Powerball ===
Wisconsin has been a member of MUSL since 1989. Powerball began on April 19, 1992, replacing the original incarnation of Wisconsin’s Megabucks. Its minimum jackpots is $40 million; it is drawn Wednesdays and Saturdays. Plays are $2; with the PowerPlay, $3.
