= Illinois Lottery =

American lottery

- Region: Illinois, United States
- First draw: July 1, 1974
- Operator: Allwyn
- Website: illinoislottery.com

The Illinois State Lottery (known simply as the Illinois Lottery) is an American lottery for the U.S. state of Illinois, operated by Allwyn Illinois.

== Overview ==
The Illinois Lottery began operations on July 1, 1974, when lotteries in the United States were confined to areas of the Northeast and Midwest.

The drawings are supervised by an independent auditor who certifies the winning results. Illinois was the only single jurisdictional state lottery to have their drawings televised nationwide (which were broadcast throughout the United States and much of Canada via WGN-TV's national superstation feed WGN America [now NewsNation]). The 9 p.m. newscast was removed from WGN America in February 2014 as they begin their transition to a general cable network.

The Illinois Lottery is one of 45 lottery jurisdictions that participate in Mega Millions and Powerball – of these jurisdictions, 44 of the 45 lotteries offer both games. The Lottery also offers Lotto with a smaller jackpot, which is drawn on Monday, Thursday and Saturday nights. Pick 3 and Pick 4 numbers are drawn twice daily. Until April 16, 2014, with the discontinuation two months before of WGN-TV's 9 p.m. newscast from WGN America, the same numbers applied to those playing the same games in neighboring Iowa; that state now draws their own numbers. Lucky Day Lotto (5/45), with a minimum jackpot of $100,000, is drawn twice a day.

In 2009, the Illinois legislature passed amendments to the Lottery Law that approved the Internet Pilot Program to launch the sale of the Mega Millions and Lotto games on the Internet. The Illinois Lottery suspended the sale of Mega Millions tickets as the state's General Assembly struggled to pass a budget including lottery funding for the 2018 fiscal year. On December 23, 2011, a U.S. Justice Department decision provided much anticipated clarity to Illinois' and other U.S. lotteries by confirming that the sale of lottery products over the Internet by lotteries in United States jurisdictions was legal. On March 25, 2012, Illinois became the first jurisdiction to allow internet lottery sales. Adults with an IP address within the state of Illinois can play the Lottery in this manner. The program was approved to run for 36 to 48 months on a trial basis, before being implemented permanently sometime afterwards. The June 4, 2024 Mega Millions jackpot of $552 million was won by an Illinois resident who purchased their ticket via the Illinois State Lottery's online platform.

On October 1, 2015, the Illinois Lottery started determining the winning numbers electronically, using a computer with a random number generator, instead of using machines with numbered balls; furthermore, live draws were no longer televised, but rather posted on the Illinois Lottery's website, and on the Lottery's YouTube channel. Prior to this date, the selection of the winning numbers had been broadcast on WGN-TV for more than 25 years.

Winners of a Mega Millions (on an Illinois Lottery ticket) or a Lotto jackpot must choose the cash option within 60 days of the drawing if the cash option is desired (a Powerball jackpot winner on an Illinois Lottery ticket has 60 days after claiming to make their choice). Purchasers must be at least 18 years of age to purchase an Illinois Lottery ticket.

In December 2016, a Chicago Tribune investigation found that the Illinois Lottery simply suspended many of its most expensive games before awarding its largest prizes. While many lotteries across the United States do not award all its largest, the Tribune investigation found that Illinois's rate of awarding top prizes was significantly lower. In one example, a game called The Good Life was distributed with tickets at $30 each, with two top prizes of $46 million, but the game was ended before the lottery sold most of the printed tickets.

In January 2018, the Camelot Group, a gaming company based in the United Kingdom owned by the Ontario Teachers' Pension Plan, became the new operator of the Illinois Lottery. The state of Illinois was the first in the US to privatize its lottery system.

=== Distribution of funds ===
Illinois Lottery proceeds currently benefit three major areas: 1) the state's Common School Fund (CSF), which helps finance K–12 public schools; 2) The Capital Projects Fund, used for infrastructure improvements and job creation and 3) special causes like Illinois veterans, breast cancer charities and research, assistance for people living with HIV/AIDS, and multiple sclerosis research. Each of the four special causes above is funded by a unique instant scratch-off game authorized by the Illinois General Assembly.

When the Lottery began in 1974, proceeds went into the state's General Revenue Fund. In 1985, a law was enacted to earmark all Lottery proceeds to the CSF. A similar initiative was vetoed a year earlier by then-governor James R. Thompson, who said the bill earmarking Lottery proceeds to the CSF would give people the wrong impression that the Lottery would be a panacea for school funding.

The Lottery's first contributions from special-cause instant games occurred in the 2006 fiscal year. The first contribution to the Capital Projects Fund occurred in 2010. In 2012, the Lottery contributed $639,875,000 to the CSF; $65,200,000 to the Capital Projects Fund; and $3,421,368 in support of the four special-cause instant games initiated to date. The Illinois Lottery has contributed more than $18 billion to charitable causes from its inception through 2013.

=== Suspension of payouts ===
Beginning on July 1, 2015, the Illinois State Lottery suspended payouts on jackpots of $25,000 or more due to a state budget impasse that would eventually stretch to the end of August 2017. In October 2015, this was extended to all winnings above $600. The stated reason was that there was no legal authority for the Illinois Lottery or Illinois's comptroller to issue checks. Despite this, the state continued to offer its lottery games for play. The move drew criticism from some lawmakers, including one who has described the move as fraud. The following month, the Illinois Lottery became the subject of a class-action seeking to recoup the monies not paid since the suspension of payouts, including a group of players owed at least $288.4 million. Finally, on December 7, 2015, Illinois Governor Bruce Rauner signed legislation which allowed for the resumption of all payouts.

== Current draw games ==
=== In-house draw games ===
==== Pick 3 ====
Pick 3 (originally known as The Daily Game) launched on February 19, 1980. It started out as a single-drawing game that was held on Monday through Saturday evenings. On March 20, 1983, the lottery began to offer Sunday drawings of Pick 3. Ten years later on December 20, 1993, it expanded to 14 draws weekly with the addition of midday drawings. Pick 3 draws three sets of balls numbered 0 through 9. Prices, options, and payouts vary.

==== Pick 4 ====
Pick 4, similar to Pick 3, began on February 16, 1982, with drawings held on Tuesday and Friday evenings. On August 27, 1984, drawings expanded to six nights a week with the addition of Monday, Wednesday, Thursday and Saturday draws. Sunday drawings were added on March 9, 1985. Concurrent with the expansion of Pick 3 to daily drawings, on December 20, 1993, Pick 4 expanded to 14 draws weekly with the addition of midday games. The game draws four sets of ten balls numbered 0 through 9. Prices, options and payouts vary.

=== Fireball ===
On September 1, 2013, the Illinois Lottery introduced an optional feature to Pick 3 and Pick 4, called "Fireball", to provide a chance to obtain more winning number combinations. The option can be added for a cost equivalent to the player's original base wager(for example, if a Pick 3 wager is 50¢, it costs an additional 50¢ to add the "Fireball" option); The fireball number is drawn from 10 balls numbered 0 through 9 for each game during each day and night pick 3 and pick 4 drawing. Players can use the fireball number to replace a number drawn by the lottery to make new combinations. A fireball prize is awarded to players who match the numbers in any given fireball combination. A bonus prize will be awarded if the player matches the base game numbers and any of the resulting fireball combinations to where the Fireball number can replace a lottery drawn number that is identical to the Fireball number drawn.

==== Lucky Day Lotto ====
In the current version of Lucky Day Lotto, a player pays $1 and picks 5 numbers from a field of 1 to 45 (or gets 5 randomly assigned numbers as a "quick pick"). Players matching all 5 numbers split a parimutuel jackpot that starts at $100,000. Players matching 4 of 5 numbers win $200, players matching 3 of 5 numbers win $15, and players matching 2 of 5 numbers win $1. Lucky Day Lotto drawings take place twice a day, seven days a week.

For an additional $1 per game, players can add an EZMatch option. With EZMatch, five additional numbers are randomly assigned. If any of the EZMatch numbers match any of the regular field numbers chosen by the player, there is an instant payout of an amount varying from $2 to $5,000.

Historically, on June 1, 1988, Illinois created "Cash 5", which began as a 5/35 game that was drawn on Mondays, Wednesdays and Fridays. On May 15, 1989, the game's name was changed to "Little Lotto Cash 5", then "Little Lotto". New drawing balls were introduced on April 6, 1990; the game used a Beitel Criterion drawing machine. On November 7, 1994, five of the possible numbers were removed from the game(with the matrix becoming 5/30). Little Lotto became a Monday-through-Friday game beginning with the August 4, 1998 drawing. On February 25, 2004, the number matrix for "Little Lotto" changed again, to 5/39, with jackpots beginning at $100,000; the game's drawing also expanded to seven days a week. In 2012, Little Lotto was renamed Lucky Day Lotto. On July 14, 2014, Lucky Day Lotto was changed again, to 5/45, with 4/5, 3/5, and 2/5 rewards being doubled while maintaining the same jackpot theology.

==== Lotto ====
In the current version of Lotto, a player pays $2 and picks 6 numbers from a field of 1 to 50 (or gets 6 randomly assigned numbers as a "quick pick"). Players matching all 6 numbers split a parimutuel jackpot that starts at $2,000,000 and rolls by $150,000 until it is won. Players matching 5 of 6 numbers win a variable amount that averages $2,000, matching 4 of 6 win a variable amount that averages $50, matching 3 of 6 numbers win $5, and matching 2 of 6 win $1. Lotto drawings take place on Monday, Thursday, and Saturday. Lotto now has three drawings: the Jackpot drawing, Lotto Million 1, and Lotto Million 2. Historically, Lotto began on February 19, 1983, as a Saturday-only game, with six plus an "alternate" of 40 numbered balls being drawn. On May 19, 1984, it became a 6/44 game. On December 1, 1985, advance play was introduced. On January 15, 1986, Wednesday drawings were added; the game was played twice weekly until April 15, 1987. Beginning with the May 7, 1988 drawing, the matrix in which the six numbers could be drawn increased from 44 to 54. On April 7, 1990, new balls and a Beitel Criterion drawing machine debuted. Wednesday drawings were reintroduced on August 15, 1990. On January 15, 1998, the 6/54 matrix was scaled down to 6/48, featuring an all-cash jackpot that began at $1 million (previously, the jackpot was annuitized, with no cash option). The matrix changed again to 6/52 on April 14, 1999, and added a fourth prize, $3, for matching three numbers; the jackpot again became annuitized, but with a cash option. On April 1, 2021, the matrix is changed from 6/52 to 6/50 and the base wager was raised to $2 to support the entry for the Main draw and 2 additional draws (Lotto Million 1 and Lotto Million 2, both have a $1,000,000 cash prize). The odds of winning a jackpot in the game's current version are 1 in 15,890,700 for a single set of drawn numbers.

===== Lotto Extra Shot =====
In November 2012, Illinois introduced an add-on to Lotto, called Lotto Extra Shot. While regular Lotto plays are $2 per game, Lotto Extra Shot plays are $3. A Lotto Extra Shot purchase adds a "quick picked" number from 1 through 25 for each play. Matching the Extra Shot number increases the payout received.

Players matching the Extra Shot and either 5, 4, 3, or 2 of the 6 numbers of the regular field receive a payout that is 25 times the payout without the Extra Shot. When matching the Extra Shot and 5 regular field numbers this is a variable amount that averages $50,000. When matching 4 it is a variable amount that averages $1,250. When matching 3 regular field numbers the prize is $125, and when matching 2 it is $25. There is also a payout for matching the Extra Shot and 1 or no regular field numbers – $10 or $5, respectively. Matching the Extra Shot when also matching all 6 regular field numbers does not increase the jackpot payout.

==== Instant games ====
Multiple scratch games in varying amounts and themes are offered by the lottery, including games based on licensed properties such as the NBC game show Deal or No Deal. Chicago and St. Louis area sports teams also have tie-ins with the Lottery.

=== Multi-jurisdictional games ===
==== Mega Millions ====
On September 6, 1996, six U.S. lotteries, including Illinois', launched The Big Game. Six years later, The Big Game added Mega Millions to its name; the game now is known simply as Mega Millions.

Mega Millions' minimum jackpot is $40 million. Players pick 5 numbers from 1 to 70 for the primary numbers and 1 number from 1 to 25 for the mega ball. Each set of numbers costs $2 for the base game, $3 with the megaplier add on, where players can win up to $5 million without hitting the jackpot.

Initially, Mega Millions drawings were to be held at the WGN-TV studios; however, to entice the Georgia Lottery to switch from Powerball, The Big Game′s drawing machines were moved to Atlanta before its first drawing.

Mega Millions tickets are currently sold in 44 states plus the District of Columbia and the U.S. Virgin Islands.

In late October 2017, Mega Millions became $2 per play ($3 with the "Megaplier").

Mega Millions sales in Illinois were suspended on June 30, 2017, due to the state's budget dispute. Mega Millions sales resumed on July 7, 2017, after the Illinois House came to an agreement on a new state budget.

==== Powerball ====
On October 13, 2009, the Mega Millions consortium and MUSL reached an agreement to cross-sell Mega Millions and Powerball. Illinois, already a Mega Millions member, began selling tickets for both games on January 31, 2010. In 2012, the price of a Powerball play was raised to $2 ($3 with the "PowerPlay" option). Powerball tickets are sold in the same jurisdictions as Mega Millions.

Powerball sales in Illinois were suspended on June 28, 2017, due to the state's budget dispute. Powerball sales resumed on July 7, 2017, after the Illinois House came to an agreement on a new state budget.

== Retired draw games ==
=== Lotto 7 ===
Beginning on April 22, 1987, the Illinois Lottery offered a second jackpot game called "Lotto 7". The game was drawn on Wednesday nights. Jackpots were paid in annuities, never offering a cash option. "Lotto 7" was discontinued on May 4, 1988.

Players chose 7 numbers from 1 to 39. The "Lotto 7" Game replaced the Wednesday "Lotto" Draw.

=== My 3 ===
"My 3" began on September 9, 2012, with drawings held daily at 10:30 a.m. and 6:30 p.m. CT. The game, which was separate from "Pick 3", allowed players to choose numbers without the need to specify the type of wager being made. Players had to match all three digits in exact order to win $200. Lesser amounts were won depending on the order in which three digits were drawn.

The final "My 3" drawing was on September 14, 2014.

=== Hit or Miss ===
This game had a similar title to the All or Nothing game (although it made its way to Illinois in September 2013 with an unknown end date). The game was played by picking 12 numbers from 1 to 24 for each game played. Unlike the All or Nothing concept and format, players also had an additional number selected at random called the life ball number(from 1 to 5) which only applied to the game’s top prize which was $250,000. Players who match all or none of the numbers drawn with the good life number won the top prize and $100,000 a year for life (the $100,000 a year for life prize was paid on a financial annuity over 20 years or the player was given a $1.2 million cash value for such annuity). The game was drawn 4 times a day every day (at 10:30 a.m., 12:40 p.m., 6:30 p.m. and at 9:22 p.m. Central time).
