= Minnesota State Lottery =

Government agency

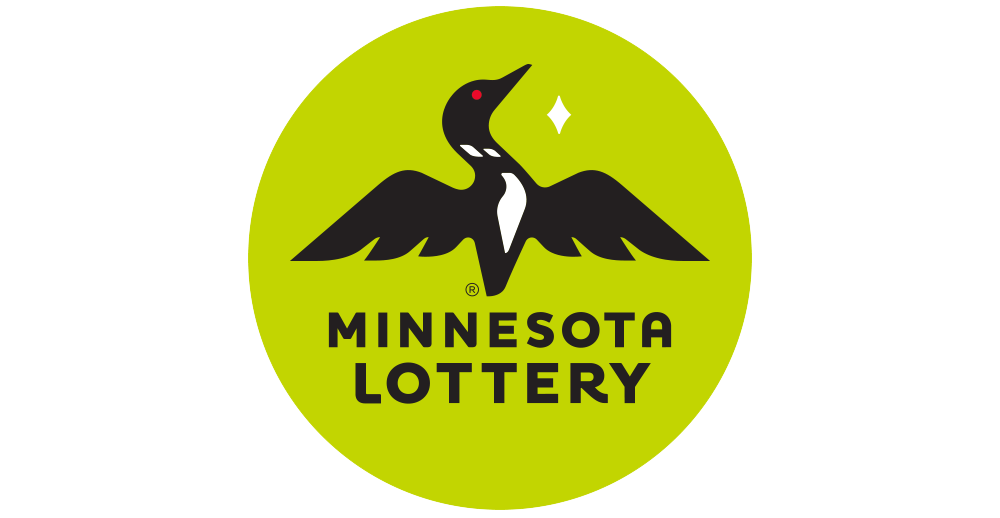
- Minnesota Lottery logo (debuted in 2014)

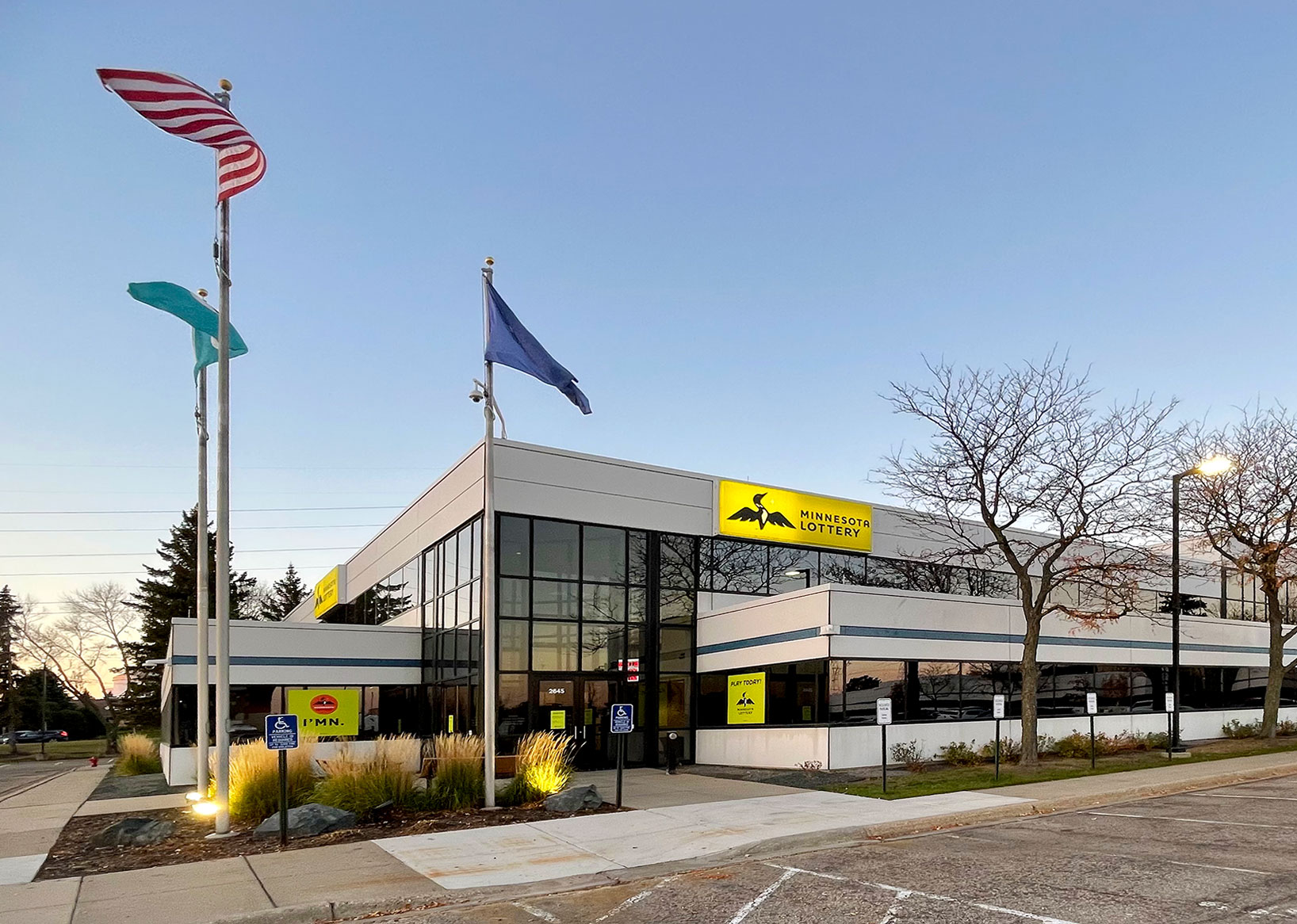
- Lottery headquarters (2023)
- Formation: April 17, 1990
- Type: State lottery
- Headquarters: Roseville, Minnesota, United States
- Coordinates: 45.021294°N 93.193470°W
- Executive Director: Adam Prock
- Revenue: $740.2 million (FY2022)
- Staff: 154 (2015)
- Website: www.mnlottery.com

The Minnesota Lottery, officially the Minnesota State Lottery, is a government agency that operates lotteries in the U.S. state of Minnesota. The state’s lottery system was established in 1988 through a successful voter referendum that amended the state’s constitution. Lottery revenue is paid out towards prizes, administrative expenses, and retailers, and the remaining proceeds are split between environmental conservation funds and the state's general fund. The Minnesota Lottery participates in the Multi-State Lottery Association and several other multi-jurisdiction games. In-house draws include Pick 3 (previously Daily 3), Gopher 5, and North 5 (previously Northstar Cash), among many other games and offerings.

Over the three decades since its first game debuted on April 17, 1990, expansion and management of the lottery has resulted in controversy. In the early 1990s, the Minnesota State Lottery partnered with a technology company to develop a lottery cartridge for a modem-equipped Nintendo Entertainment System but had to cancel a test run of an in-home lottery system after political pushback. A corruption probe in the early 2000s effectively ended with the suicides of a long-time director and a public relations contractor, and mismanagement of the lottery agency led to the ouster of several top executives in the 2010s. The lottery posted its record level of sales in the fiscal year 2020 period at $668.6 million. The lottery has been criticized for relying disproportionately on sales to people with below-average incomes and operating with a lack of oversight.

== History ==
=== 1960s to 1980s: modern lottery movement ===
Modern state lotteries began with the creation of a sweepstakes in New Hampshire in 1964, a New York state lottery in 1967, and a New Jersey lottery in 1970. In Minnesota, bills first emerged in 1972 to amend the state's constitution to permit a lottery, and by 1986 a bill was narrowly defeated in the legislature. By the late 1980s, public opinion polls revealed popular support for a lottery idea, with betting at the Canterbury Downs racetrack in Shakopee, charitable gambling, and Indian tribal casinos proving both popular and profitable in the state.

After several years of debate about the creation of a state lottery system, the Minnesota Legislature put the decision before voters. In 1988, Minnesotans approved with 59% of the vote a referendum to amend the state's constitution to authorize a state lottery, but it did not codify how lottery revenue would be used, leaving it up to the legislature to decide. Legislation establishing the lottery passed in 1989.

=== 1990s: debut and expansion ===
The first ticket sales, for an instant scratch-off game, began on April 17, 1990. Political disputes about how to direct revenue and state budget pressures led to a second lottery-related constitution amendment in 1990, which established and dedicated 40% of lottery proceeds to an environment and natural resources trust fund.

Soon after its creation, the lottery quickly expanded to other games and concepts. The Minnesota lottery joined the multistate Lotto America game in 1990. (Lotto America transitioned to the Powerball game in 1992). In 1991, the lottery added the Minnesota-only Daily 3 and Gopher 5 lotto games, which were considered "on-line" as they used a central computer system.

In partnership with Nintendo and the Bloomington-based Control Data Corporation, the state agency had plans to launch a test lottery with 10,000 Minnesota households in 1992 via an experimental modem for the NES. At the time, Japanese consumers were able to use the Nintendo Famicom console for banking and stock purchases with the Network System peripheral. The American console had a relatively unknown expansion port that made the device capable of connecting to phone lines. Lottery officials hoped that in-home lottery ticket sales would spur growth that had flattened. Technology companies hoped the idea would spur greater American interest in the burgeoning industry of electronic commerce. Nintendo hoped the effort would extend the useful life of the NES console that was being supplanted by the SNES. The lottery would have been conducted via connection to a central computer and with pre-paid credits and an encrypted password to ensure users were 18 years of age or older. The concept was ultimately not pursued after receiving substantial opposition by advocates worried that use of an in-home video game console would encourage youth gambling. Several editorial pages and state legislators condemned the plan.

Prior to 1995, the lottery maintained accounts outside the state treasury, until a change in statute moved lottery proceeds to state funds, with the exception of day-to-day operating accounts. The state's constitution was amended again in 1998 to extend authorization of the lottery to 2025.

=== 2000s: corruption and investigations ===
In 2003, the lottery received criticism by an environmental advocacy organization for operating at a higher cost than comparable lotteries in other states. State lawmakers placed stricter spending limits on lottery operations, which resulted in 34 staff layoffs. The agency added the Minnesota-only game Northstar Cash, an all-cash lotto, the same year.

In 2004, George R. Andersen, the longtime director of the lottery who had served in the role since its inception in 1990, died the day after meeting with the Legislative Auditor about a pending report. His death was the result of an overdose of pain medication and ruled a suicide. Governor Tim Pawlenty appointed Michael Vekich to succeed Anderson and head the embattled lottery agency, a role Vekich served in for eight months. Vekich was credited with increasing productivity and reducing the lottery's operating costs.

In 2005, Michael Priesnitz, a public relations executive who was both a friend of Anderson and contractor of the lottery, died of a self-inflicted gunshot wound to the head. Priesnitz's death came a month after the lottery cancelled a $1.3 million promotional contract with his company and as he was under a probe by the Minnesota Department of Public Safety. Ramsey County prosecutors concluded in 2006 that Anderson had engaged in "a string of self-dealing, favor granting, and contract-rigging actions of the type expected from the ‘Chicago-style’ politics of the past." Prosecutors did not file criminal charges as the two main suspects, Anderson and Priesnitz, were both dead.

=== 2010s: managerial strife ===
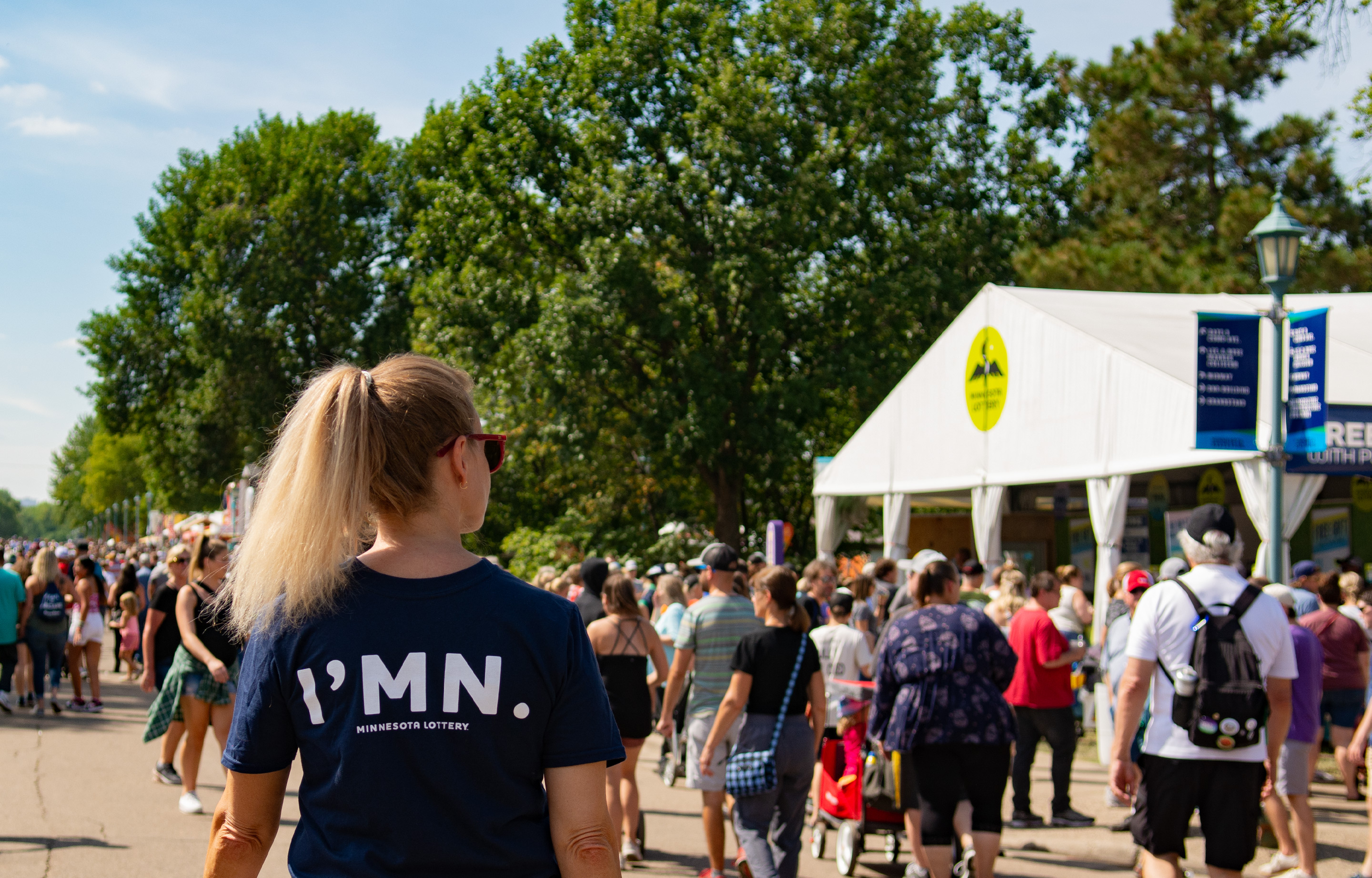
Minnesota Lottery booth at the State Fair in 2022

Lottery ticket sales were suspended during the 2011 Minnesota state government shutdown. An estimate of the 20-day government closure put the revenue losses of the lottery to state funds at $9,988,000.

The lottery introduced ticket sales at gas pumps and ATMs and offered online games in 2012. By 2015, the state legislature shutdown the newer types of game offerings.

In 2015, lottery director Ed Van Petten resigned under pressure from Governor Mark Dayton. Van Petten had already drawn criticism from state lawmakers for expanding the lottery without sufficient authorization. When he was confronted by the Minneapolis-based Star Tribune newspaper about lavish expenses that he charged to state accounts, Van Petten resigned the following day. Controversially, Van Petten was reimbursed $7,000 for staying with his staff at timeshares he owned while attending out-of-state conferences. Minnesota Management and Budget determined the reimbursements were not allowable, and Van Petten later repaid the agency.

Johnene Canfield, the lottery's interim director after Van Petten's departure, was fired in 2015 after being intoxicated at out-of-state conferences and meetings. Canfield sued to be reinstated on the grounds that alcoholism was a disorder and that she was held to a different workplace standard due to her gender. The Minnesota State Lottery had a policy disallowing alcohol consumption in the office, but allowed it in moderation at conferences. Canfield alleged that Van Petten, the former lottery director, encouraged her to drink at conferences. Canfield later pled guilty to an unrelated drunken-driving charge that resulted in a serious crash in 2015. In 2017, a Ramsey County District Court narrowed the scope of the suit to potentially allow Canfield to return to the lottery as a lower-level employee but not as its director.

Among the managerial turmoil at the lottery, Vekich was re-appointed director in 2016 by Governor Mark Dayton of the Democrat-Farmer-Labor party, though Vekich he had served under the GOP administration of Tim Pawlenty and he had run briefly as Republican candidate for governor. Vekich was an in acting role for more than a year until Robert Doty was appointed by Dayton in 2017 as the lottery's chief.

By 2018, unaffiliated, out-of-state companies were essentially operating as courier services to facilitate online sales of Minnesota Lottery games for state residents.

Newly elected governor Tim Walz in 2019 tapped Adam Prock, the director of communications for the lottery, to take over the executive director role. The lottery posted three years of consecutive, record earnings for the fiscal year 2018, 2019, and 2020 periods.

=== 2020s: profits and a pandemic ===
Sales revenues during the fiscal year 2020 period that ended on June 30 totaled a record $668.6 million, a 5% increase above the previous high of $636.8 million set in 2019. Players won $423.6 million in 2020, the highest single-year total in the lottery’s 30-year history, and retailers took in $44.8 million while the state collected $156 million. Mitigation measures for the COVID-19 pandemic in Minnesota were seen as a factor driving sales despite people staying home and record levels of unemployment. As with other state lotteries, ticket sales were uninterrupted by Walz's emergency stay-at-home order and considered an "essential" service, but the agency's regional field offices closed to the public, which affected some prize claiming. Some retailers also decided to halt sales to prevent the spread of COVID-19, which also affected prize claiming and sales in the state.

== Games and eligibility ==
The Minnesota Lottery offered 48 different games in 2020. It has participated in several multi-jurisdiction games: Lotto America, Lucky for Life (ended participation in 2021), Mega Millions, and Powerball. It offered the brand-name lotto games Pick 3 (previously Daily 3), Gopher 5, and North 5(previously Northstar Cash), as well as several other scratch games, "print-n-play" games, and raffles.

The minimum legal age to purchase a ticket or claim in a prize in Minnesota has been 18. Winners had one year from the date of the draw to claim game prizes. Minnesota statute had required the names of winners to be made public. But a change in state law required the lottery to withhold winners’ names after September 1, 2021, unless authorization is given.

== Governance ==
=== State agency ===
The Minnesota State Lottery is a relatively small agency of the State of Minnesota. The 1989 law that established the lottery gave it unprecedented autonomy for a state agency. It has a director appointed by the governor and a lottery commission that acts in an advisory role. The director must hire personnel to operate the lottery in accordance with Minnesota Statutes, and one staff position must be for an attorney to perform legal responsibilities for the lottery. The lottery's headquarters are in Roseville and it has four regional offices in the cities of Virginia, Detroit Lakes, Marshall, and Owatonna. In 2015, the state lottery employed 154 people.

=== Retailers ===
The lottery contracts with local retailers like gas stations, grocers, and convenience stores to sell tickets. Nearly any retailer—or organizations such as non-profits and charities with a retail business open to the general public—may apply for a license to sell lottery tickets. Minnesota Alcohol and Gambling Enforcement Division conducts compliance checks of lottery retailers. There were 3,100 lottery retailers in the state at the end of 2018.

== Revenue ==
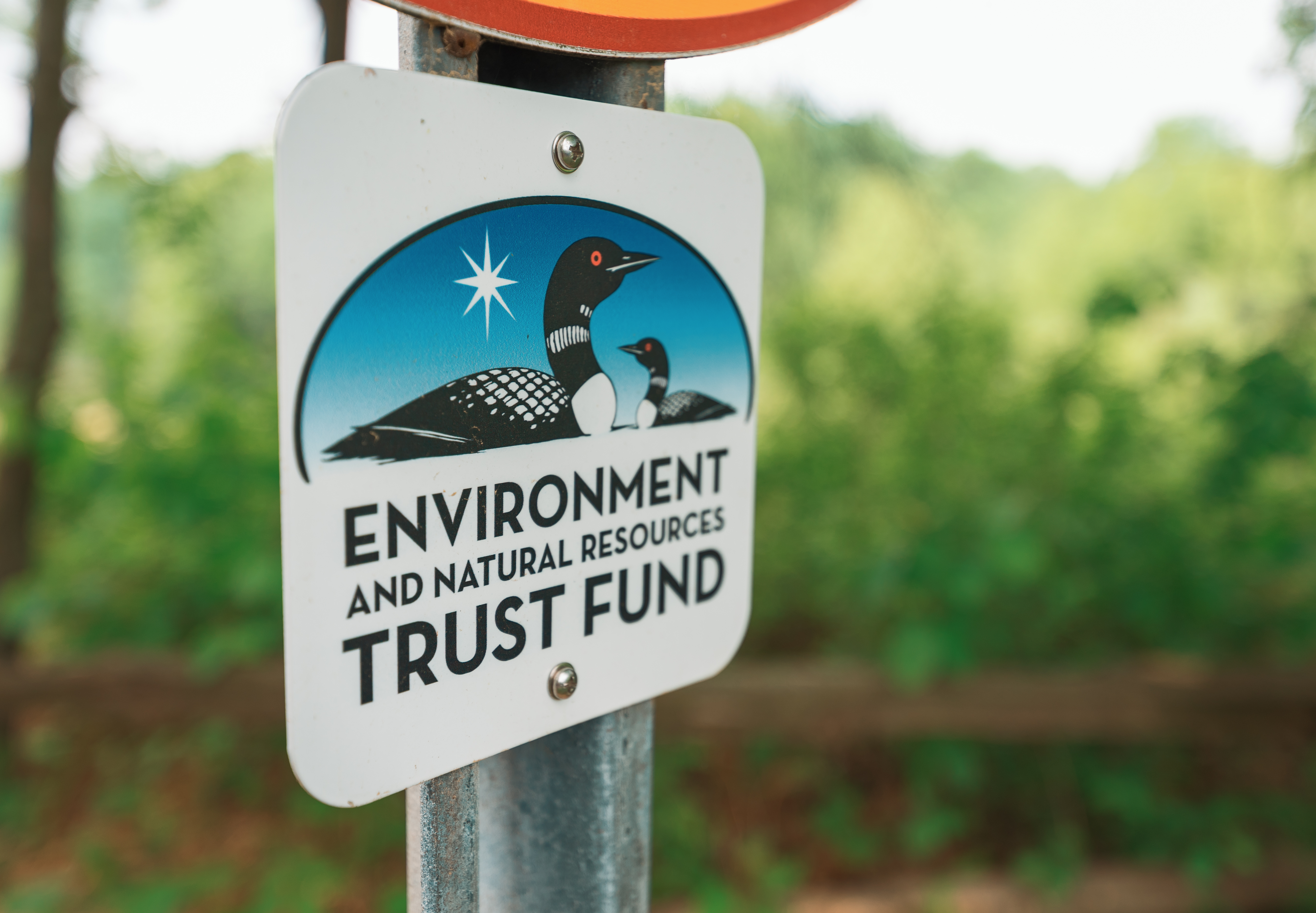
Sign of an Environment and Natural Resources Trust Fund site in Inver Grove Heights in 2018

=== Distribution ===
By Minnesota Statute, lottery revenue is paid out towards prizes, administrative expenses, and retailers, and the remaining portion is split between a wildlife and environment trust fund and the state's general fund.

The exact distribution of proceeds has changed several times since the lottery's creation. Of the portion retained by the State of Minnesota, 60% goes towards the general fund and 40% goes towards the environment and natural resources trust fund. The lottery also produces state revenue from a 6.5% in-lieu-of-sales tax on lottery tickets, which is credited to the state's general fund, game and fish fund, and natural resources fund. Some lottery proceeds offset the cost of a Minnesota Department of Human Services' compulsive gambling program to the amount of approximately $2 million annually by 2015.

The state-operated lottery is considered a recreational activity, not an investment enterprise, that generates revenue. Winning players as a group receive approximately 62% of played dollars back.

=== Endowment funds ===
Money from the lottery owed to the state is deposited in state trust funds that function like an endowment. The 17-member Legislative-Citizen Commission on Minnesota Resources(LCCMR)—though it was established in 1963 and pre-dates the lottery—makes recommendations to the legislature for use of lottery proceeds credited to special environment and natural resource trust funds. The state legislature appropriates all trust fund dollars for specific uses. The Minnesota State Lottery does not have a role in the LCCMR and appropriations process.

=== Total state earnings ===
Over a three-decade period, from its inception in 1990 to 2020, the lottery had generated approximately $3.3 billion for the state with $1.4 billion toward environmental conservation and another $1.9 billion towards other state funds.

== Controversy and criticism ==
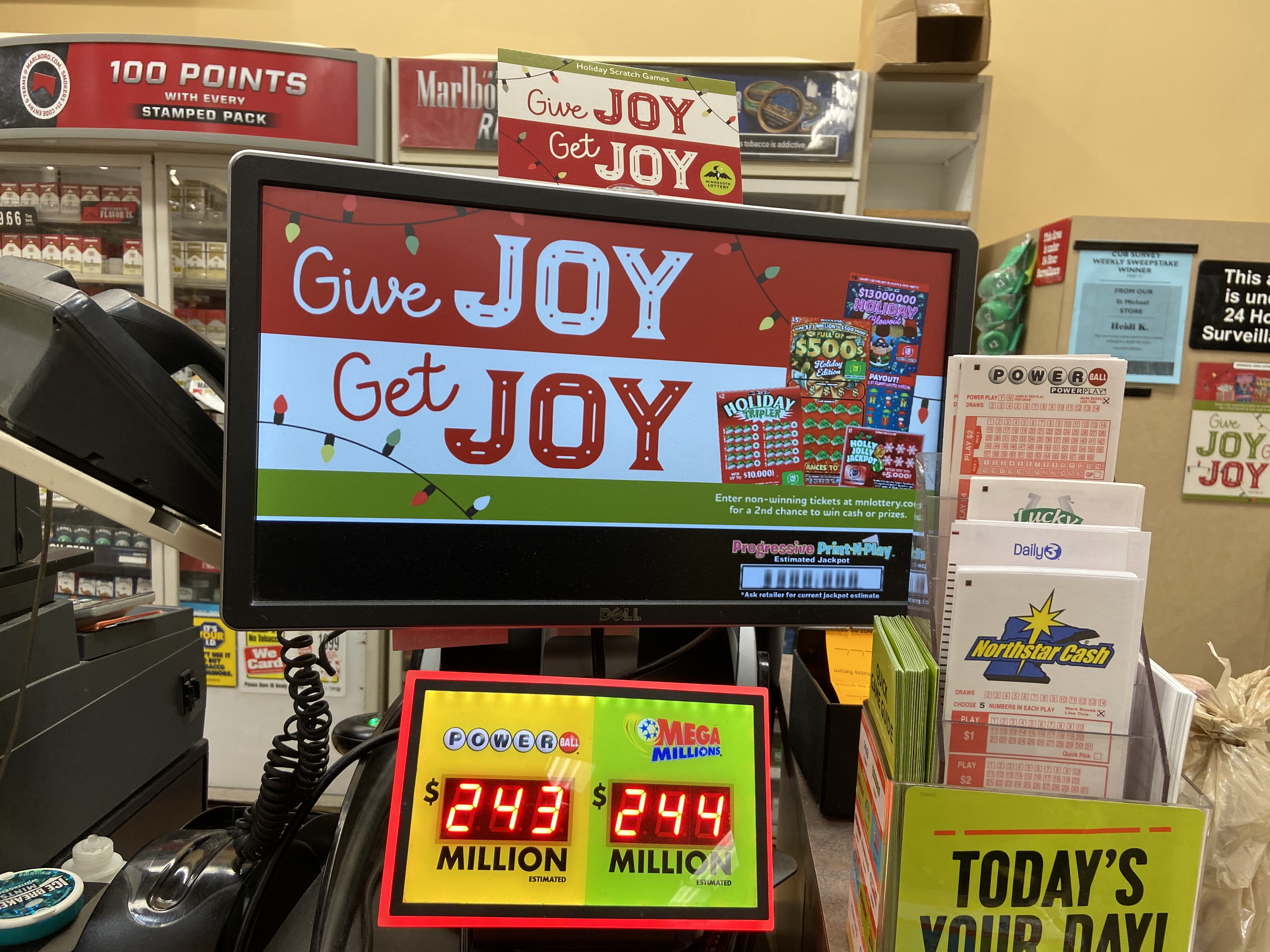
Holiday themed gambling

A common criticism of lotteries is that they are a de facto tax on the poor. Multiple studies of the lotteries offered in Minnesota and other U.S. states have found that the people who play instant lotto games are more likely to have below-average incomes. In Minnesota, three out of every four instant lottery tickets were sold to people with a below-average income level. Poor people also tend to spend a higher percent of their income on lotteries than wealthy people. Similar to other state lotteries and customer mix of private businesses, 20% of lottery players in Minnesota account for 80% of total revenue.

Lottery officials have expressed concern about Minnesotans gifting lottery scratch cards to minors. Researchers have established a link between the age a person first gambles and the occurrence of excessive gambling later in life. A survey in 2019 found that as many as 2% of Minnesota students had gambling problems.

Over its history, the Minnesota State Lottery has enjoyed a degree of autonomy, but that resulted in a lack of oversight. In the mid 2000s, a state auditor uncovered preferential contracting for a friend of the director. In the 2010s, several directors and senior managers were forced out for controversial management practices and abuse of state finances.

In 2024 the state proposed allocating 1.5% to underserved communities. This could amount to around 30 million per year to unnamed projects with little oversight. The measure is on the 2024 ballot.

== See also ==
- Economy of Minnesota
- Gambling in the United States
- Pull-tab
