= Tennessee Lottery =

American state lottery

Tennessee Lottery Corporation
- Official logo
- Formation: June 11, 2003
- Type: Lottery System
- Headquarters: Nashville, Tennessee, U.S.
- Website: tnlottery.com

The Tennessee Lottery is run by the Tennessee Education Lottery Corporation (TELC), which was created on June 11, 2003, by the Tennessee General Assembly. TELC derives its legal authority from the Tennessee Education Lottery Implementation Law, which the General Assembly passed following a November 2002 Amendment to the state constitution establishing the lottery and approved by 58 percent of the voters.

The TELC is responsible for the operation of a lottery, and is deemed to be acting in all respects for the benefit of the people of Tennessee. It is a member of the Multi-State Lottery Association (MUSL); it participates in the Mega Millions and Powerball games.

The TELC sold its first ticket on January 20, 2004. On July 28, 2007, Tennessee switched from ball drawings to those using a random number generator (RNG). However, Powerball (which moved its drawings from MUSL's Iowa headquarters to Florida in 2009) continues to be ball-drawn; likewise, Mega Millions is ball-drawn in Atlanta, with the Megaplier RNG selection conducted in Texas, as California does not have the Megaplier option.

Tennessee began its third multi-jurisdictional jackpot game, Hot Lotto, on May 12, 2013; it is the game's 16th member. On that date, Hot Lotto changed its double matrix and how the jackpot will be advertised.

Tennessee also has an in-state jackpot game, Tennessee Cash, which replaced Pick 5 in October 2010.

People must be at least 18 years of age to purchase or redeem TELC tickets; only cash can be used to purchase lottery tickets.

== Current games ==
=== In-house draw games ===
==== Cash 3 ====
Cash 3 is drawn thrice daily, except once on Sundays. It draws 3 digits, each 0 through 9. Prices, prizes, and options vary.

==== Cash 4 ====
Cash 4 also is drawn 19 times weekly; it draws a four-digit number in the same fashion as Cash 3.

===== Wild Ball =====
In October 2021, the Lottery added a new add-on feature to both Cash 3 and Cash 4 games, replacing the Lucky Sum, called the Wild Ball. The Wild Ball feature doubles the cost. The Lottery draw one different Wild Ball number for Cash 3 and Cash 4.

==== Daily Tennessee Jackpot ====
The Tennessee State Lottery Commission has introduced this game on November 13, 2022. Players pick 5 numbers from 1 to 38. The Jackpots start at $30,000 and increase by $10,000 until there's a winner. Players need to match their numbers to the drawn numbers to win the jackpot with prizes for matching 2, 3, or 4 main numbers drawn. Drawings are held every night just like the lottery’s cash 3 and cash 4 evening draws.

==== Tennessee Cash ====
Tennessee Cash is the first in-state progressive jackpot game. Players pick 5 numbers from 1 to 35, and 1 Cash Ball number from 1 to 5. The jackpot starts at $200,000 and grows from there and it can go up over $1,000,000. Players also win by matching at least 2 numbers, with or without the Cash Ball number. The minimum prize is a free Tennessee Cash QP ticket, for matching 2 main numbers. All other prizes are pari-mutuel. Drawing are held at Mondays, Wednesdays and Fridays.

=== Multi-jurisdictional games ===
==== Cash4Life ====
The Tennessee lottery joined Cash4Life on November 1, 2015; it is also offered in Florida, Georgia, Indiana, Maryland, New Jersey, New York, Pennsylvania, and Virginia.

Players choose 5 of 60 numbers in one field, and 1 of 4 green "Cash Ball" numbers in the second field. Live drawings are held on Monday and Thursday evenings at 9 pm Eastern Time on Livestream. The top prize (win or share) is $1,000-per-day-for-life ($365K yearly). Second prize is $1,000-per-week-for-life ($52K yearly). A winner of either "lifetime" prize can choose cash in lieu of the annuity. Unlike Tennessee's in-house draw games, Cash4Life is drawn with numbered balls and drawing machines (in New Jersey).

==== Powerball ====
Since 2004, Tennessee has been a member of MUSL. Powerball began in 1992. Powerball's jackpots begin at $40 million, and it is drawn on Wednesday and Saturday nights.

== See also ==
- Lotteries in the United States
