= Iowa Lottery =

Lottery authority for the state of Iowa in the US

The Iowa Lottery Authority is run by the state of Iowa. It is a member of the Multi-State Lottery Association (MUSL), which administers games on behalf of the member lotteries. The Iowa Lottery portfolio includes Powerball, Mega Millions, Lotto America, Lucky for Life, Pick 3, Pick 4, plus numerous instant scratch ticket, InstaPlay and pull-tab games.

The largest jackpot won in Iowa so far was in October 2018. Lerynne West of Redfield claimed a $343.9 million Powerball prize. West's ticket split the $687.8 million Powerball jackpot in the Oct. 27 drawing with a ticket purchased in New York.

== History ==
Legislation creating Iowa's lottery was signed into law in April 1985; the Lottery began sales on August 22, 1985, with a kickoff celebration at the Iowa State Fair.

The first product sold by the Iowa Lottery was an instant-scratch game called Scratch, Match and Win; players bought more than 6.4 million tickets during its first week.

Since the lottery's start in 1985, its players have won more than $4.5 billion in prizes while the lottery has raised $2 billion for the state programs that benefit all Iowans. Today, lottery proceeds in Iowa have four main purposes. They provide support for our state's veterans and their families through the Iowa Veterans Trust Fund; support through the Iowa Public Safety Survivor Benefits Fund for the surviving family members of Iowa peace officers and fire fighters who die in the line of duty; help for a variety of significant projects through the state General Fund; and backing for the Vision Iowa program, which was implemented to create tourism destinations and community attractions in the state and build and repair schools.

The Lottery sells tickets in four general categories: instant-scratch, InstaPlay, pull-tab and online games. Lottery products are sold at nearly 2,400 retail locations.

The Iowa Lottery has over 110 employees who work at its headquarters in Clive and its regional offices in Cedar Rapids, Council Bluffs, Mason City and Storm Lake.

In 1994, Iowa became the first state in the US that required lottery players to be at least 21 years of age. (Louisiana became the second in 1998, followed by Arizona in 2003, then Mississippi in 2019)

In September 2007, the Iowa Lottery (along with the Kansas Lottery) began the first US multi-jurisdictional scratch game, Midwest Millions.

Iowa's Pick 3 and Pick 4 numbers were previously drawn by the Illinois Lottery at the WGN-TV studios in Chicago using their Pick 3 and Pick 4 results until April 16, 2014, when the Iowa Lottery began drawing their own numbers two months after WGN America, which previously televised all Illinois Lottery drawings, discontinued airing their 9 p.m. newscasts, along with the diverging winning options for each game between each lottery over the years. As of July 1, 2017, the Iowa Lottery now utilizes Indiana's Hoosier Lottery results from their Daily 3 and Daily 4 drawings for Pick 3 and Pick 4 numbers in Iowa, with the latter's Super Ball doublers disregarded in Iowa.

== Current Iowa-only games offered ==
=== Pick 3 ===
Pick 3 is drawn 14 times weekly (twice daily) and gives players a chance to win up to 600 times the price they pay for each play type. Options and prizes vary. Players have the ability to pay anywhere from 50 cents to $5 on each set of numbers on any play type except for the straight box play type where players have to pay in increments of $1, from $1-$5 for each set of numbers that qualifies for the straight box play type.

Players choose three digits, each from 0 through 9, or let the lottery terminal select them (Easy Pick). If the player wants to have the lottery terminal pick the numbers for him or her, those numbers will be assigned at random with the $1 straight/box play type.

Play types:

- Straight – selected numbers must match the winning numbers exactly. This play type pays up to $3,000. The prizes are bigger on this play type because it’s harder to match the winning numbers exactly.
- Box – selected numbers must match the winning numbers but can be in any order. This play type pays up to $1,000.
- Straight/Box – combines a straight and a box play type so that the players can win prizes for each set of numbers that match in exact order (which wins prizes for both play types) or in any order. The prizes are cut in half on this play type as the risk but the reward is prizes for this play type go up to $2,000.
- Front pair – players have to match the first two numbers exactly. This play type pays up to $300.
- Back pair - Players have to match the last two numbers exactly. This play type pays up to $300.

Players can play up to eight drawings for either midday or evening draws or up to 16 drawings for both midday and evening drawings.

Midday drawings are held daily at 12:20 p.m. and evening drawings are held daily at about 10:00 p.m. Pick 3 sales end 20 minutes prior to each drawing.

Pick 3 prizes must be claimed within 90 days of the drawing for which they were eligible.

=== Pick 4 ===
Pick 4 also is drawn 14 times weekly giving players a chance to win up to 6,000 times the price they pay for each play type. Options and prizes vary.

Players choose four digits, each from 0 through 9, or let the lottery terminal select them (Easy Pick) via a $1 straight/box play type. Players have the ability to wager anywhere from 50 cents to $5 (straight/box wagers range from $1 to $5, in increments of $1) if they were to choose their own numbers and play type.

Play types:

- Straight – selected numbers must match the winning numbers exactly. This play type pays up to $30,000.
- Box – selected numbers must match the winning numbers but can be in any order. This play type pays up to $7,500.
- Straight/Box – combines a straight and a box play type so that players can win if they match their numbers in the exact order (which wins them straight and box prizes) or in any order. The risk is that the prizes are cut in half but the reward is the prizes run up to $18,750.
- Front pair – Players have to match the first two numbers in the exact order drawn. This play type pays up to $300.
- Back pair – Players have to match the last two numbers in the exact order drawn. This play type pays up to $300.

Pick 4 players may play their numbers for up to eight drawings for either midday or evening drawings or up to 16 drawings for both midday and evening drawings. Drawings are held at the same time as Pick 3. Pick 4 sales end 20 minutes prior to each drawing.

Pick 4 prizes must be claimed within 90 days of the drawing for which they were eligible.

== Current multi-jurisdictional games offered ==
- Powerball
- Mega Millions
- Lotto America
- Lucky for Life

== Previous games offered ==
=== All or Nothing ===
Iowa, along with Minnesota, offered the MUSL version of the All or Nothing lottery game. Due to low sales, the game was ended and the final drawing for the All or Nothing game was held on June 30, 2017.

=== Hot Lotto ===
Hot Lotto was available through 14 lotteries, including Iowa's and the District of Columbia's; its drawings were held each Wednesday and Saturday. Hot Lotto drew five "white balls" numbered from 1 through 47, and one orange "Hot Ball", numbered 1 through 19. The starting jackpot was $1,000,000 (all-cash, and "taxes paid"), increasing by at least $50,000 if there is no top prize winner. Hot Lotto, normally $1 per play had a $2 option. Players could add the Sizzler option to their tickets (similar to Powerball's Power Play); it tripled non-jackpot prizes.

On May 12, 2013, the Hot Lotto game dropped its annuity option; eight "white balls" were added to the original 39.

The game acquired some notoriety in 2015, when it was revealed that Eddie Tipton, an employee of the Multi-State Lottery Association, attempted to rig a 2010 drawing to claim a $16.5 million prize. Hot Lotto held its final drawing on Oct. 28, 2017. Since its jackpot was not won in the final drawing, the money was rolled into the start of the Lotto America game.

=== $100,000 cash game ===
The Iowa Lottery has offered this game with an unknown start date. The game has offered a top prize of $100,000. The game was retired in January 2014 to make room for the all or nothing game (see above).
