= Montana Lottery =

American state lottery

- Region: Montana
- Operator: Intralot
- Chief executive: Bob Brown, Director
- Regulated by: Montana Department of Justice Gambling Control Division
- Website: www.montanalottery.com

The Montana Lottery is run by the government of Montana. It is a member of the Multi-State Lottery Association (MUSL). The Montana Lottery's portfolio consists of scratch tickets, plus Mega Millions, Powerball, Lotto America, Montana Millionaire, Lucky for Life, Big Sky Bonus, Montana Sports Action, Treasure Play and Montana Cash.

The Montana Lottery was created by referendum in 1986. It passed by a wide margin and the Montana Lottery opened for business in June 1987. Since then, it has paid out at least $590 million to players in prizes, and has generated over $259 million for the State of Montana.

In Montana, the minimum age to purchase a lottery ticket is 18.

== History ==
The Montana Lottery was created by citizen referendum and passed on November 4, 1986, by 68.97% of voters.

In 1995 the state legislature passed SB 83, which redirected lottery revenue earmarked for the Superintendent of Public Instruction to the General Fund as "part of a larger bill simplifying revenue allocations throughout state government."

On August 31, 2008, the Montana Lottery began fantasy sports wagering, called Montana Sports Action, which is offered under the authority of MCA 23-4, a law passed by the Montana Legislature in 2007 to help the Board of Horse Racing increase purses in Montana. The Board of Horse Racing may also use the funds raised in other ways to stimulate horse racing in Montana. The law requires that 74% of the money wagered be returned to players in prize payouts. The remaining 26% is shared between the establishments offering Montana Sports Action, the Board of Horse Racing, and the Montana Lottery. (Sports betting in the US also was legal in Delaware, Nevada, and Oregon prior to the Supreme Court ruling the Professional & Amateur Sports Protection Act (PASPA) unconstitutional in May 2018, opening the door for other states to legalize sports betting.)

In 2019, gaming associations recommended that the Montana Lottery have a competitive bidding process for its lottery operations contract. Amid allegations of a "sweetheart deal" with its long-time operating vendor, Intralot; in March and September 2024, the Montana State Lottery Commission instructed Director Bob Brown, appointed in March 2024, and staff to send out requests for new proposals (RFPs) for its $50 million lottery operator contract. In 2025, the Commission came under fire for sidestepping a competitive and transparent bidding process; on February 5, Brown appeared before the Joint Appropriations Subcommittee on General Government at the Montana Legislature and was grilled over persistent delays and the Montana Lottery's avoidance of the bidding process. In March, with investigations on-going, Montana Lottery cancelled its negotiations with Intralot to pursue competitive bidding.

== Current draw games ==
=== In-house draw games ===
==== Big Sky Bonus ====
Big Sky Bonus draws daily at 7:30 p.m. Mountain Time. Tickets may be purchased up to two minutes before the drawing. Players can choose to play up to seven consecutive drawings.

On April 25, 2021, the game's number matrix shifted from 4/28 + 1/17 to 4/31 + 1/16.

==== Montana Cash ====
Montana Cash is played Wednesdays and Saturdays. It draws 5 numbers from 1 through 45. Players get two games for $1. The jackpot starts at $40,000 and rolls over until it's won.

Prior to May 14, 2014, the game drew 5 numbers from 1 to 37 with a starting jackpot of $20,000.

=== Multi state games ===
==== Lotto America ====
Lotto America draws on Wednesdays and Saturdays at 8:59 p.m. mountain time. The jackpot starts at a guaranteed $2 million and grows each time the jackpot is not won. For an additional $1 per play, All Star Bonus provides the opportunity to multiply any Lotto America prize you win (excluding the jackpot) up to five times.

==== Lucky for Life ====
Lucky for Life is a lottery drawing game available in 23 states and the District of Columbia. Players select 5 numbers from 1 through 48, and a green "Lucky Ball" numbered from 1 through 18. Lucky for Life, which began as a Connecticut-only game, Lucky-4-Life, has a top prize of $1,000-per-day-for-life, and a second prize of $25,000-per-year for life. ("Lifetime" winners can choose cash in lieu of the periodic payments.)

==== Mega Millions ====
On September 6, 1996, six lotteries began the-then The Big Game; it became Mega Millions in May 2002. Its jackpots begin at $20 million (annuitized with cash option.) Mega Millions draws 5 white balls numbered 1 through 70, and 1 gold-colored Mega Ball numbered 1 through 25.

Most lotteries with either Mega Millions or Powerball prior to January 31, 2010, added the other game on that date. The Montana Lottery added Mega Millions on March 1, 2010, becoming the first lottery to add the "other" game after the official cross-selling expansion about a month prior. As with all Mega Millions members (except for California), Montana offers Mega Millions' multiplier, called Megaplier; it multiplies all non-jackpot prizes by up to 5x. A second-prize wager with "Megaplier" can win $5 million cash.

==== Powerball ====
Since 1989, the Montana Lottery has been a member of MUSL. Powerball began in April 1992. Powerball's jackpots are at least $20 million. It is also drawn Monday, Wednesday, and Saturday nights. Powerball draws 5 white balls from 1 to 69 and 1 red Powerball from 1 to 26. Powerball also has an optional multiplier, PowerPlay, which multiplies a non-jackpot prize by 2x to 5x. When the jackpot is at $150,000,000 or less, a power play number of 10x can be drawn. Also the power play match 5 prize is always set at $2,000,000 regardless of the power play number selected. All other non jackpot prizes are multiplied by the power play number selected.
