= Mississippi State Lottery =

Lottery in Mississippi

- Formation: August 28, 2018
- Type: Lottery System
- Headquarters: Flowood, Mississippi, U.S.
- Website: www.mslottery.com

The Mississippi State Lottery is a lottery authorized by the Alyce G. Clarke Mississippi Lottery Law in 2018. It is administered by the Mississippi Lottery Corporation. The corporation expected to begin scratch off sales by December 1, 2019, with sales of draw game tickets in 2020. However, this was bought forward to November 25 as announced by Mississippi Lottery Corporation. On August 2, 2019, the Mississippi Lottery Corporation announced its acceptance into the Multi-State Lottery Association, with sales of Mega Millions and Powerball beginning on January 30, 2020.

Unlike most U.S. lotteries, the minimum age to buy tickets is 21, the same as Arizona, Iowa and neighboring Louisiana.

== Lottery Act ==
The Alyce G. Clarke Mississippi Lottery Act was passed by the Mississippi House of Representatives on August 28, 2018, in a 58–54 vote, following a 60–54 vote against the bill the previous day. The bill states that net proceeds up to $80 million will be paid into the State Highway Fund each fiscal year until June 30, 2028. Proceeds above the $80 million threshold will be paid into Mississippi's Education Enhancement Fund. From July 1, 2028, net proceeds up to $80 million will be transferred into the Lottery Proceeds Fund and from there into the State General Fund. Proceeds above $80 million will continue to be transferred into the Education Enhancement Fund. Mississippi Governor Phil Bryant signed the bill on August 31, 2018.

== History ==
While Mississippi was an early adopter of casino gambling (primarily in the town of Tunica and along the Gulf of Mexico), like many other Bible Belt states it was reluctant to start a state lottery due to opposition from religious leaders. In addition, casino operators were against a lottery as it could potentially sway gamblers away from casinos. The formation of a state lottery in Mississippi was made possible in November 1992, when fifty-three percent of the state's electorate voted to repeal Section 98 of Article 4 of the Mississippi Constitution, which read: “No lottery shall ever be allowed, or be advertised by newspapers, or otherwise, or its tickets be sold in this state; and the Legislature shall provide by law for the enforcement of this provision; nor shall any lottery heretofore authorized be permitted to be drawn or its tickets sold.”

In 2004, Alyce Clarke introduced a bill to create a state lottery in Mississippi but met with strong opposition from Republican governor Haley Barbour and the leaders of both houses of legislature, so much so that the Mississippi Baptist Convention did not feel the need to mobilize its own opposition.

== Current games ==
=== Scratch-offs ===
The Mississippi State Lottery launched its first four scratch-off games – $100,000 Jackpot, 3 Times Lucky, Happy Holidays Y'All, and Triple 7 – at 05:00 on November 25, 2019. Over $2.5 million of sales were recorded in the first day and $8.9 million in the first week.

=== Cash 3 ===
The lottery's first statewide draw game, Cash 3 was introduced on September 1, 2020. Drawings occur twice daily(at 2:30 PM & 9:30 PM)(originally was once daily before July 31, 2022) and the top prize is $500 for an exact straight match. Like most other states that run a "daily number"-style game, Mississippi offers exotic wagers such as boxes and any-order, plus a "one-off" option.

=== Cash 4 ===
The lottery's third statewide draw game, Cash 4 was introduced on January 10, 2022. It plays similarly to Cash 3, but with a 4-digit number, and the top prize is $5,000 for an exact match.

==== Fireball ====
From July 31, 2022, the Lottery added a Fireball feature, which gives players an additional opportunity to create winning combinations. With Fireball, players can replace one of the Lottery drawn Cash 3 or Cash 4 winning numbers with the Fireball number drawn for more ways to win. Adding Fireball doubles the cost of the play and can be added to any Cash 3 or Cash 4 play type.

=== Cash Pop ===
The lottery's fourth statewide draw game, Cash Pop was introduced on November 1, 2022. Cash Pop is a drawing game based on the drawing of a single number from 1 to 15. Players can choose to wager on as many of the numbers as they wish for a given drawing, paying for each number covered. Each ticket has a base odds of 15-to-1, but the prize is different for each ticket, even for the same number; the higher the prize, the less likely it is to appear, with the top prize appearing on only 1 in 1000 tickets for a given number(for an overall winning odds of 15,000-to-1). Wagers for a given ticket can be $1, $2, $5, or $10, with the prizes scaling proportionally to the wager and a maximum prize of $2,500(on a $10 wager). Tickets played apply to the next drawing(s), which occur two times a day(at 2:30 PM and 9:30 PM, like Cash 3 & Cash 4 does). Cash Pop commenced the ticket sales and the first Midday & Evening drawings on November 20, 2022.

=== Match 5 with Multiplier ===
The lottery's second in-state, and first progressive jackpot game, introduced on March 15, 2021. The starting jackpot prize is $50,000*, and if there's no winner in a drawing, it keeps rolling. The players pick 5 numbers from 1 to 35, and each play costs $2. For an additional $1, the player can multiply the non-jackpot prizes with the Multiplier feature, by 2, 3, 4, or even up to 5 times. Unlike multiplier features from the 2 multi-state games', if the player purchase the game with the Multiplier, the terminal will generate a random Multiplier number for each set(s) of numbers. The player also wins by matching at least 2, 3, or 4 numbers. The drawings are take place every night at around 9:30 p.m. CST, where the drawing results available after 10:00 p.m. CST(previously was every Tuesday, Thursday, and Saturday nights before Sep. 10th, 2023). Match 5 commenced the ticket sales on April 28, 2021, and the first drawing was held one day later.

Match	Base prize	Multiplier 2x prize	Multiplier 3x prize	Multiplier 4x prize	Multiplier 5x prize	Odds
5 of 5	Jackpot	N/A				1 : 324,632
4 of 5	$200	$400	$600	$800	$1,000	1 : 2,164
3 of 5	$10	$20	$30	$40	$50	1 : 75
2 of 5	Free Ticket	2 Free Tickets	3 Free Tickets	4 Free Tickets	5 Free Tickets	1 : 8

The overall odds of winning a prize are approximately 1 in 7.2.

(*)The jackpot prize is pari-mutuel if there are multiple winners. The starting jackpot may change time-to-time based on sales.

=== Multi-jurisdictional games ===
Mississippi started selling Mega Millions and Powerball tickets on January 30, 2020, then starting selling Lotto America tickets on May 12, 2024.
