= List of six-number lottery games =

A six-number lottery game is a form of lottery in which six numbers are drawn from a larger pool (for example, 6 out of 44). Winning the top prize, usually a progressive jackpot, requires a player to match all six regular numbers drawn; the order in which they are drawn is irrelevant. Functionally, these games are similar to five-number games, except, because of the need to match a sixth number, the top-prize odds are longer. Therefore, six-number games generally offer a higher top prize.

A straight six-number game is different from "two-drum" games such as Powerball, Cash4Life, Lucky for Life, and Mega Millions. While these games also draw six numbers, five are from one set, while a sixth is drawn from a second pool. These "5+1" games also require all six numbers to be matched for the top prize, but the use of a separate field for the last number lengthens the odds considerably.

In a variant of the six-number game, such as Pennsylvania's Match 6, the player receives three sets of six numbers for each play; the sales terminal automatically generates two of these sets. A player wins either by matching enough numbers in any of the three sets against those drawn, or by matching enough numbers across all three sets. The jackpot is won in the "classic" way, by matching all six numbers in one set, rather than the total matched against the 18.

Some six-number games actually draw seven numbers; the first six for the top prize, and a seventh, "bonus" number for some lower-tier prize levels. These "bonus" numbers are drawn from the remaining numbers in the same drum, rather than from a second set of numbers.

Some six-number games have a top prize(jackpot or otherwise) that always is paid as a lump sum, whereas other six-number games have an annuity top prize; generally, all six-number games with an annuitized top prize have a cash option.

Six-number games historically are the most popular kind of lottery in the U.S., although "5+1" games have grown in popularity, especially with the rise of multi-state games. The Canadian Lotto 6/49 is one of its two national lottery games. Typically, six-number games cost $1 or $2 per play, and most are drawn twice weekly, often Wednesdays and Saturdays.

== List ==
Most lotteries offer a six-number game(using one drum.) Some are listed below, with number fields and drawing frequency:

=== Asia ===
- Singapore: TOTO
- Thailand: Thai lottery
- South Korea: Lotto 6/45 (45; Saturdays)

=== Australia ===
- National: Lotto (45, Saturdays), Weekly Windfall / Millionaire Medley (45, Mondays, Wednesdays, and Fridays)

=== New Zealand ===
- New Zealand: Lotto (40; Wednesdays & Saturdays)

=== Canada ===
National

- Canada (national): Lotto 6/49 (49; Wednesdays & Saturdays)

Provincial

- Atlantic Lottery Corporation: Atlantic 49 (49; Wednesdays & Saturdays)
- British Columbia: BC 49 (49; Wednesdays & Saturdays)
- Ontario: Lottario (45; Saturdays), Ontario 49 (49; Wednesdays & Saturdays)
- Québec Québec 49 (49; Wednesdays & Saturdays)
- Western Canada Lottery Corporation Western 649 (49; Wednesdays & Saturdays)

=== Europe ===
- United Kingdom: Lotto (59; Wednesdays and Saturdays)
- Scandinavia: Vikinglotto (48+1 Viking ball out of 5; Wednesdays)
- Slovakia: Loto (49; Wednesdays, Fridays and Sundays)
- Slovenia: Loto (44; Wednesdays and Sundays)
- Hungary: Lotto 6 (45; Thursdays and Sundays)
- Bulgaria: TOTO 2 (6/49 and 6/42) Thursdays and Sundays
- Switzerland: Swiss Lotto (6/42) (42+1 Bonus ball out of 6; Wednesdays and Saturdays)
- Switzerland and Liechtenstein: International Lottery in Liechtenstein Foundation (49; Wednesdays)
- Ireland Lotto (47, Wednesdays and Saturdays)
- Russian Federation: Sportloto 6 to 45 (5 times per day)

=== United States ===
- Arizona: The Pick (44; Wednesdays & Saturdays), Triple Twist (42; daily)
- Arkansas: Lotto (40; Wednesdays & Saturdays)
- Colorado: Colorado Lotto+ (40; Wednesdays & Saturdays)
- Connecticut: Lotto! (44; Tuesdays & Fridays)
- Delaware: Multi-Win Lotto (35; daily)
- Florida: Florida Lotto (53; Wednesdays & Saturdays), Jackpot Triple Play (46; Tuesdays & Fridays)
- Illinois: Lotto (50; Mondays, Thursdays, & Saturdays)
- Indiana: Hoosier Lotto (48; Wednesdays & Saturdays)
- Louisiana: Lotto (42; Wednesdays & Saturdays)
- Maryland: Multi-Match (43; Mondays & Thursdays)
- Massachusetts: Megabucks (44; Mondays, Wednesdays & Saturdays)
- Michigan: Lotto 47 (47; Wednesdays & Saturdays)
- Missouri: MO Millions (42; Wednesdays & Saturdays)
- New Jersey: Pick-6 (46; Mondays, Thursdays & Saturdays)
- New York: Lotto (59; Wednesdays & Saturdays)
- Ohio: Classic Lotto (49; Mondays, Wednesdays & Saturdays)
- Oregon Megabucks (48; Mondays, Wednesdays, & Saturdays)
- Pennsylvania: Match 6 (49; daily)
- Texas: Lotto Texas (54; Mondays, Wednesdays & Saturdays)
- Virginia: Bank a Million (40 numbers, Wednesdays & Saturdays)
- Washington: Lotto (49; Mondays, Wednesdays, & Saturdays)
- West Virginia: Cash 25 (25; Monday, Tuesday, Thursday, & Friday)
- Wisconsin: Megabucks (49; Wednesdays & Saturdays), SuperCash! (39; daily)

== See also ==
- List of five-number lottery games
