= Massachusetts Lottery =

State agency

- Formation: September 27, 1971; 55 years ago
- Type: State lottery
- Owner: Government of the Commonwealth
- Website: www.masslottery.com

The Massachusetts Lottery was established on September 27, 1971, following the legalization of gambling by the Massachusetts General Court, the legislature of the Commonwealth. The Lottery is administered by the Massachusetts State Lottery Commission. It is a member of the North American Association of State and Provincial Lotteries (NASPL) since 1972.

As with most U.S. lotteries, lottery games in Massachusetts require players to be at least 18 years old.

Drawings are no longer telecast as of 2011.

== Massachusetts State Lottery Commission ==
The Massachusetts Lottery is run by the Massachusetts State Lottery Commission (MSLC).

The MSLC has five members:

- the Treasurer and Receiver-General of Massachusetts, who serves as Chair of the MSLC
- the Secretary of the Massachusetts Department of Public Safety
- the Comptroller, who serve on an ex officio basis
- two other members, appointed by the Governor

A Director of the Lottery is appointed by the Chair of the MSLC, albeit requiring approval by the Governor. The Director reports directly to the Chair.

== Current draw games ==
=== In-house draw games ===
==== The Numbers Game ====
The Numbers Game is played twice daily. It draws 4 1-digit numbers, bets can be made on a 1-digit and/or 2-digit number. 3-digit numbers are "first 3" or "last 3," as a 3-digit number is not drawn separately. Minimum wagers are 25 cents on a 3-digit or 4-digit number, and 50 cents on a 2-digit number or 1-digit.

Payouts are on a pari-mutuel basis, the payout percentage is 60% on 1- and 2-digit wagers, 70% on 3-digit bets, and 50% on a 4-digit number.

Bet table:

Numbers Game bet types
	1	2	3	4
$0.25	✕	✕	✓	✓
$0.50	✓	✓	✓	✓
$1.00	✓	✓	✓	✓
$2.00	✓	✓	✓	✓
$5.00	✓	✓	✕	✕

==== Keno ====
Keno is mainly played at retailers that are equipped with game monitors, although it is available at every location. Keno started on September 30, 1993. Five minutes apart of drawing started on September 30, 1993, and ended on February 28, 2003, after 475,622 games. On February 20, 2003, Keno announced that starting on March 1, 2003, it would modify from five minutes apart of drawing to four minutes apart of drawing. Prizes and options vary. 101 games were drawn for Keno on December 22, 1995, from 12:00 p.m. to 8:25 p.m. which is the least, and 300 games were drawn for Keno from November 24, 2004, to April 29, 2023, from 5:00 a.m. to 1:00 a.m. On March 31, 2021, 316 games were drawn from 5:00 a.m. to 2:00 a.m., the most in a single day in the history of Keno. On April 30, 2023, it was modified from four minutes apart of drawing to three minutes apart of drawing with a new record of 400 games drawn.

==== The Wheel of Luck ====
This game launched on January 19, 2023, as a replacement for All or Nothing. Meant to be similar to roulette, players can select an individual number between 1 and 36, which pays 25 times their wager upon a hit, choose all red or black or all odd or even numbers, which each pay 1.5 times their wager upon a hit, two out of the three options or all three options on a single ticket. An animated roulette-style wheel spins for each drawing, in which a ball will land on a random number. Like Keno, a game is played every four minutes. Unlike Keno, and in fact every other draw game that the Lottery runs, there is no option for quick-picks.

==== Mass Cash ====
On July 17, 2011, Mass Cash expanded to daily drawings. 5 numbers 1 through 35 are drawn. Top prize is $100,000 (with a $1 million liability limit). The game is similar to neighboring Connecticut's Cash 5 basic game (without the Kicker). 4 numbers wins $250, 3 numbers, $10.

==== Megabucks ====
Megabucks is drawn on Mondays, Wednesdays and Saturdays. Tickets cost $2, up from $1 beforehand. 6 numbers from 1 through 44 are chosen. The jackpot starts at $500,000, unlike previous versions of the game, there is a cash option. Matching 5 out of 6 wins $5,000. Matching 4 out of 6 wins $200. Matching 3 out of 6 wins $4.

Between 2009 and 2023, the game was known as Megabucks Doubler, and as such there was a doubler system where random tickets purchased from vendors (As well as season tickets that had their last number matched with a randomly drawn number between 0 and 9) would have their non-jackpot prizes doubled if they were hit. As such, for example, matching 3 out of 6 numbers would award $4 instead of $2 on a regular ticket. These doubler prizes would be used for Megabucks when the game changed its format in November 2023, which also saw the doubler dropped from the game. Megabucks Doubler was drawn on Wednesdays and Saturdays, with 6 numbers chosen from 1 through 49.

=== Multi-jurisdictional games ===
==== Millionaire for Life ====
On February 22, 2026, the Multi-State Lottery Association introduced Millionaire for Life, a multi-state lottery game designed as a successor to regional lifetime games such as Lucky for Life and Cash4Life.

Offered across 30 participating state lotteries and the District of Columbia, the game features daily drawings that take place at 11:15 p.m. with a top prize of $1,000,000 a year for life.

==== Mega Millions ====
On September 6, 1996, Illinois, Georgia, Virginia, Maryland, Michigan, and Massachusetts began a jackpot game, then called The Big Game. The current name, Mega Millions, was adopted in 2002, with The Big Game name retired soon after.

The current version of the game began in April 2025. Players pick 5 numbers from the first field of 70 numbers and one Mega Ball number from the second field of 24 numbers. Each ticket costs $5, and there is a built-in multiplier in every ticket, which is drawn from 2x, up to 10x. The parimutuel jackpot starts at $50 million and grows from there until someone wins. There is a minimum rollover per drawing of $10 million.

==== Powerball ====
Powerball began in 1992. Massachusetts added Powerball on February 3, 2010.

== Instant tickets ==
The Lottery offers scratch tickets with price points of $1, $2, $5, $10, $20, $30 and $50. Top prizes range from $5,000 to $25 million. "Cash for Life" tickets offer the chance to win $500 to $10,000 a week for life.

== Former games ==
=== Lucky for Life ===
In 2009, the Connecticut Lottery introduced Lucky4Life, which became a regional game, Lucky for Life, three years later when the game expanded to include Maine, New Hampshire, Vermont, Rhode Island, and Massachusetts.

In January 2015, Lucky for Life became a "quasi-national" game, as of 2017 it is offered in 25 states and the District of Columbia.

On February 21, 2026, the final Lucky for Life drawing was held, which did not have a top prize winner. The game was replaced by Millionaire for Life, with higher prizes.

=== Mass Millions ===
Mass Millions was introduced in 1987. Similar to Megabucks, it was played the same way where players picked 6 numbers out of a field of 42, however, a bonus number was drawn during each drawing, drawings were held on Tuesday and Friday nights. Matching all 6 regular numbers won the jackpot. 5 out of 6 plus the bonus number won $100,000, 5 out of 6 won $5,000, 4 out of 6 won $100, and 3 out of 6 won $2. This game was replaced by Cash WinFall in 2004.

=== The Daily Race Game ===
The Daily Game Race was played much the same as Keno. It used a horserace-themed Keno-style computer monitor. The Daily Race Game started on April 2, 2007, and ended on June 11, 2013, due to poor sales and players' preference for poker.

=== Cash WinFall ===
Cash WinFall was drawn Mondays and Thursdays. 6 numbers 1 through 46 were chosen. The jackpot began at $500,000, it always was paid in lump sum. Lower-tier prizes were $4,000, $150, or $5 for matching 5, 4, or 3 numbers respectively, 2 numbers won another Cash WinFall bet. If the jackpot reached $2 million and was not won, the jackpot was "rolled down", hence the name, with the secondary prizes increased.

After the Boston Globe published reports of individual stores selling millions of dollars in tickets, state officials suspended the game, suspecting organized crime involvement. Investigations revealed that the profiteers were a retired couple from Michigan (who had exploited the same system when that state's lottery had the WinFall game) and a group of MIT college students who, by legally exploiting elements of the game, were practically guaranteed to win profits of approximately 20% when tickets were bought in rolldown conditions. The story was adapted into the 2022 Paramount+ film Jerry & Marge Go Large.

Cash WinFall ended on January 26, 2012, following the scandal.

=== Jackpot Poker ===
This was a poker-themed game with a side bet. Jackpot Poker started on June 17, 2013, and ended on June 30, 2016, after 318,953 games, and was replaced with All or Nothing 2 weeks and 4 days later on July 18, 2016. The basic game costs $1, if the computer-generated "hand" is a Royal Flush, the player wins $25,000. Smaller prizes are for other poker hands. A $2 wager is eligible for the Progressive Jackpot option, the minimum jackpot is $100,000.

=== All or Nothing ===
All or Nothing (stylized as ALL OR NOTHING) was a game where bettors selected 12 numbers from a pool of 24. The drawing also consisted of 12 numbers and paid out if 0-4 numbers or 8-12 numbers were matched. If bettors matched 5, 6, or 7 numbers, the most likely amounts to be matched, there would be no prize. Matching all 12 or none of the 12 paid out the jackpot (hence the name All or Nothing), which was $100,000. Other prizes included $2, $4, $25, and $400. Like in Keno, there was 1 drawing every 4 minutes. All or Nothing began drawing on July 18, 2016, following the cession of Jackpot Poker, and ended on January 4, 2023, after 702,010 games across its 6-year run. It was replaced by The Wheel of Luck 2 weeks and 1 day afterwards on January 19, 2023.

== Claiming prizes ==
For each prize of less than $600, players may collect from either a Lottery retailer or the Lottery itself. Prizes of $600 or more must be collected from the Lottery, via claim form. Prizes from $601 to $103,000 can be claimed at the Lottery's regional offices and headquarters, while prizes from $601 to $5,000 can be claimed with the Lottery's mobile app via mobile cashing. Prizes over $103,000 must be claimed at the Lottery's headquarters in Dorchester. Prizes up to $50,000 can also be claimed by mail.

=== Claim period ===
For instant tickets, the claim period usually ends 1 year after the game's end-of-sale date. For draw games, like Powerball, Mega Millions, Megabucks, and Mass Cash, the claim period lasts for one year after the draw.

=== Payment options ===
The state's lottery is unusual in that it withholds 5% on prizes over $600, instead of only over $5,000. The Federal withholding on prizes of at least $5,000 is 25%.

== See also ==
- Gambling in Massachusetts
- Lotteries in the United States
- Lottery wheeling
- Lottery payouts
- Lump sum
- Structured settlement
- Annuity (finance theory)
