= Colorado Lottery =

U.S. state lottery

- Region: Colorado
- First draw: January 24, 1983
- Regulated by: Multi-State Lottery Association
- Highest jackpot: $27,000,000
- Odds of winning jackpot: 3,838,380 to 1 (Colorado Lotto+); 201,376 to 1 (Cash 5); 1,000 to 1 (Pick 3)
- Number of games: 6
- Website: www.coloradolottery.com

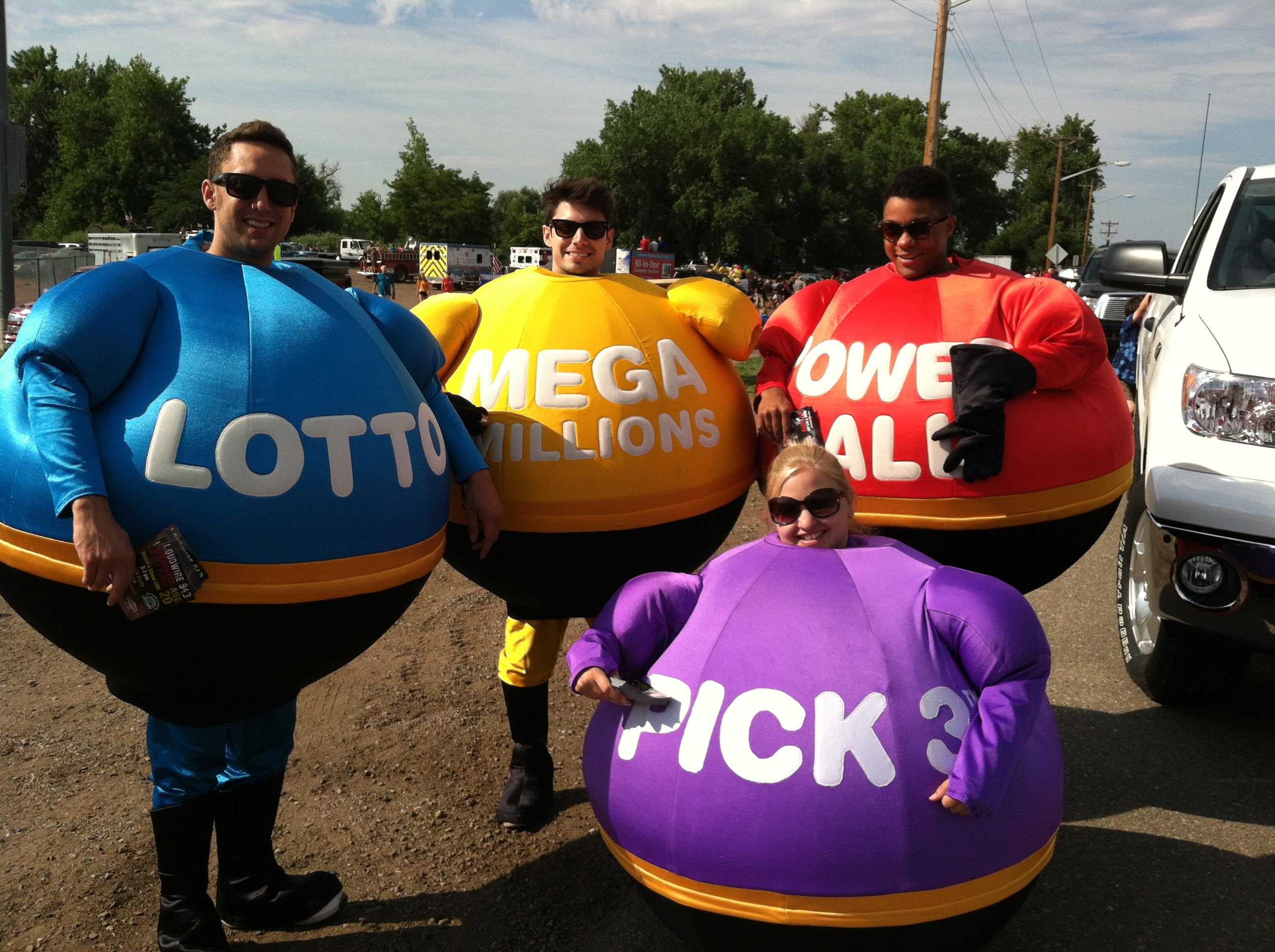
Colorado Lottery mascots

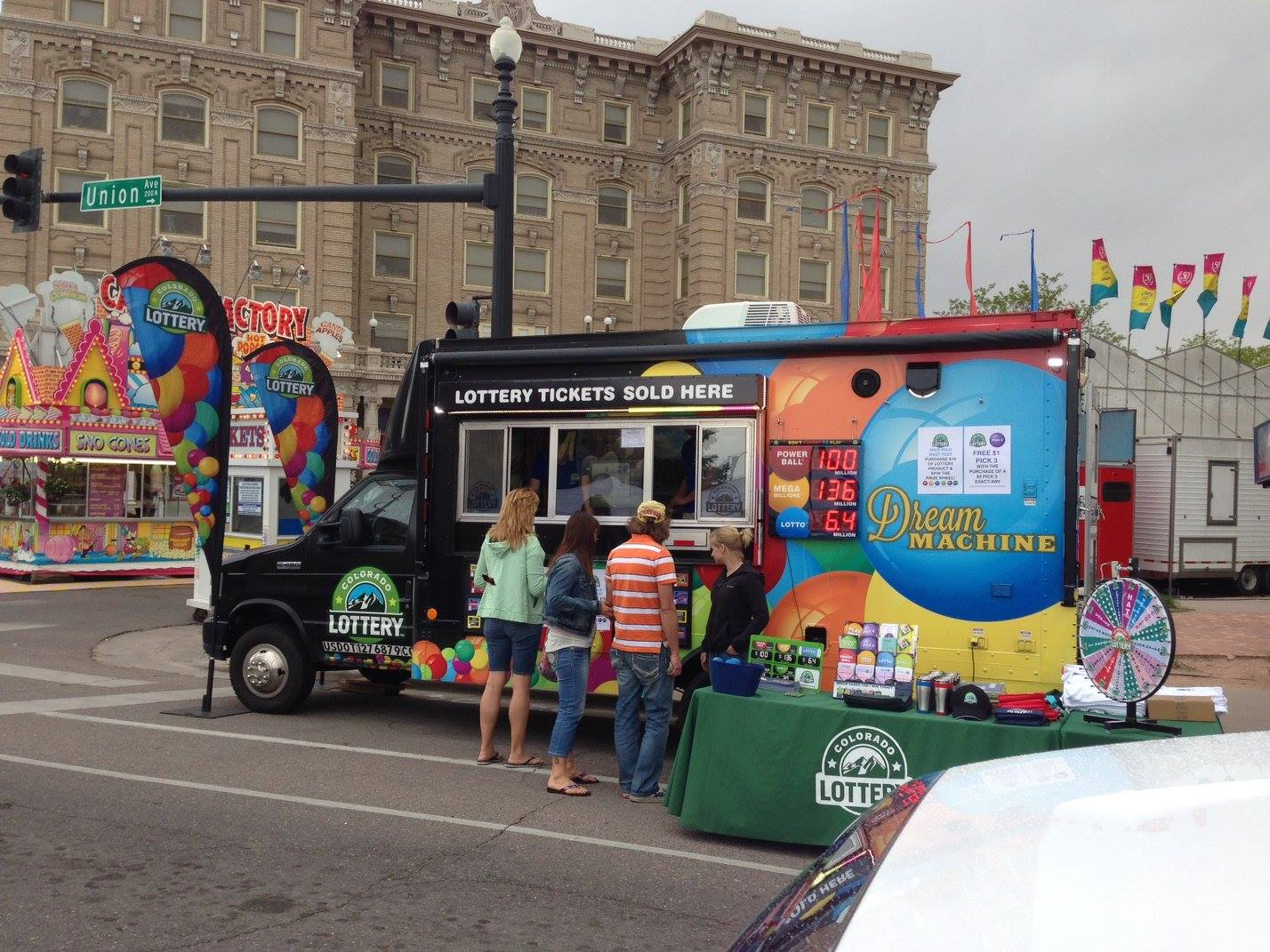
The Colorado Lottery Dream Machine in Pueblo, CO.

The Colorado Lottery is run by the state government of Colorado. It is a member of the Multi-State Lottery Association(MUSL). The Colorado Lottery began on January 24, 1983, initially selling only scratch tickets. Its first drawing took place on April 23, 1983. Colorado Lottery games include Cash 5 (with a 5-of-32 matrix), Pick 3, Colorado Lotto+, Mega Millions, Lucky for Life, and Powerball; it also sells scratch tickets. Colorado has offered fewer drawing games than most U.S. lotteries even though it began in the early 1980s; Powerball was not available in Colorado until 2001. Colorado joined Mega Millions on May 16, 2010 (the same day as South Dakota) as part of the MUSL cross-selling agreement involving both major jackpot games.

Colorado joined Lucky for Life on July 17, 2016; as of September 2017, Lucky for Life is available in 24 states and the District of Columbia (The game began in Connecticut in 2009, as Lucky-4-Life.).

Colorado Lottery revenues are directed to outdoor recreation, parks, trails, rivers, wildlife, and open space by a state constitutional amendment approved by voters in 1992. 50 percent of Lottery proceeds go to a trust fund administered by Great Outdoors Colorado (GOCO). GOCO distributes the funds through competitive grants to local governments and land trusts, 40 percent to the Conservation Trust Fund, and 10 percent goes to Colorado Parks and Wildlife. After the GOCO cap is met, proceeds fall into the BEST fund (Building Excellent Schools Today).

== Current draw games ==
=== In-house draw games ===
==== Pick 3 ====
Pick 3 began in April 2013. It draws three digits, each 0 through 9; wagers are of 50 cents to $5.00. Wager types include Exact Order, Any Order, Front Pair, and Back Pair. A 50-cent Exact Order bet can win $250.

==== Cash 5 ====
Cash 5 began in 1996. Players pick 5 numbers from 1 to 32 for each $1 game played. The top prize for the game is $20,000.

==== Colorado Lotto+ ====
Colorado Lotto+ replaced Colorado Lotto and had its first drawing on September 25, 2019. Colorado Lotto+ has several significant differences from the old lotto game. The price increased from $1 to $2, and the game matrix was reduced to 40 numbers, down from 42, giving players better odds. When each ticket is purchased, the computer randomly selects a multiplier that applies to that ticket only (2x, 3x, 4x, or 5x) for all non-jackpot prizes.

Starting jackpots begin at $1,000,000, rolling over in multiples of $100,000 (with the potential to grow to over $25,000,000) and the drawings are held on Mondays, Wednesdays and Saturdays. The jackpot averages at about $3.7 million. Optionally, players can add the “plus” option for an additional $1 on each game played (for a total of $3 per game) for a chance to win prizes up to $250,000 and bigger prizes for matching 3, 4, and 5 of the winning numbers in any order. The multiplier is also carried over to multiply each secondary prize by the number given for each ticket. The largest jackpot for this game thus far to date is $25,000,000 which has occurred in January 2022.

=== Multi-jurisdictional games ===
==== Powerball ====
Since April 2001, Colorado has been a member of MUSL. Powerball's jackpots begin at $40 million; it is drawn Wednesday and Saturday nights. Players pick 5 numbers from 1 to 69, and 1 number out of 26. The largest Powerball jackpot won in Colorado was $133 million in September 2017.

==== Mega Millions ====
On October 13, 2009 the Mega Millions consortium and MUSL reached an agreement in principle to cross-sell Mega Millions and Powerball in U.S. lottery jurisdictions. Most lotteries with either game began selling tickets for both on January 31, 2010. Mega Millions tickets have been sold in Colorado since May 16, 2010. The Colorado Lottery has not yet had a Mega Millions jackpot winner. Originally one play was $1, or $2 with the Megaplier; the latter multiplier non-jackpot prizes. Since October 2017, plays have increased to $2 each, or $3 with the Megaplier. Ticket price is now $5.00 per play with a built-in multiplier up to 5.

==== Millionaire for Life ====
Millionaire for Life is a draw game with a lifetime annuity option for the top prize. It was introduced on February 22, 2026, to replace Lucky for Life. The game draws five numbers from a matrix of 58 and one from a matrix of 5. The ticket price is $5, and the top prize is $1 million for life.

== Former games ==
=== Colorado Lotto ===
On January 24, 1989, Colorado Lotto began. Initially it was drawn Saturdays. On July 18, 1990, Wednesday drawings were added. Six of 42 numbers were chosen. The minimum jackpot was $1 million(annuity with cash option); games cost $1. Colorado Lotto's final drawing was on September 22, 2019, after which it was replaced by Colorado Lotto+. The largest Colorado Lotto jackpot was $27 million, won by Kim Walker of Boulder in 1992. The jackpot average for the game was about $3.4 million.

=== MatchPlay ===
MatchPlay, which ended on June 29, 2012, was drawn on Tuesdays and Fridays. Games were $2 each; each play consisted of three sets of six numbers. The first set could either be chosen by the player, or as a computer-generated "quick pick"; the other two always were quick picks. Six of 38 numbers were drawn. Prizes were won in two ways: "line play"(matching enough numbers in any of the six-number sets), or "combination play"(if enough of the 18 numbers across the three sets were matched. Some $2 plays won in both categories.) An example of a game similar to MatchPlay is Pennsylvania's Match 6.

==== Lucky for Life ====
Begun in Connecticut in 2009 as Lucky-4-Life, it has changed it double matrix three times, and expanded to a regional game and then "quasi-national." It also began giving "lifetime" winners the option of cash in lieu of the annuity. Players choose 5 of 48 "white balls", and a green "Lucky Ball" from a second pool, of 18 numbers. There are ten prize tiers, including two that have a "lifetime" prize. Drawings remain in Connecticut. The game had its last drawing on February 21, 2026.
