= Cash for Life =

Cash for Life may refer to:

- Cash for Life, a game produced by the Ontario Lottery and Gaming Corporation
- Cash for Life, a game produced by the Michigan Lottery
- Cash4Life, a game offered by eight U.S. lotteries
