= Oklahoma Lottery =

Lottery

The Oklahoma Lottery is an American lottery that is operated by that state's government. The Lottery, which began ticket sales on October 12, 2005, is a member of the Multi-State Lottery Association (MUSL).

Players must be 18 years or older to play.

== History ==
In 2003, the Oklahoma state legislature approved a lottery proposal to go before a vote of the people. Two questions (SQ 705 and SQ 706) were placed on the 2004 general election ballot. Both questions were approved, creating a Lottery Commission and a lottery trust fund.

== Lottery games ==
=== Drawing methods ===
Originally, Oklahoma Pick 3 and Cash 5 were drawn using traditional drawing machines and numbered balls, which Oklahoma purchased from Missouri after the latter switched to computerized (random number-generated) drawings. When Oklahoma joined Hot Lotto in 2008, that game had already switched to an RNG). On September 20, 2009, Oklahoma changed its two in-house games to RNG drawings. Mega Millions (usually drawn in Georgia) and Powerball (drawn in Florida) have always used traditional lottery machines and numbered balls.

=== Claiming winnings ===
Pick 3 and Cash 5 winners must claim prizes within 90 days of the drawing date. Lucky for Life, Mega Millions, Lotto America, and Powerball winners must claim within 180 days of the drawing.

=== Current in-house drawings ===
==== Pick 3 ====
Pick 3, drawn daily, began on November 10, 2005. Players choose three digits 0 through 9, either selected by the player, or selected by the lottery terminal ("Easy Pick".)

==== Cash 5 ====
Oklahoma Cash 5, initially thrice weekly when begun in 2005, has been drawn nightly since July 2009. Players pick 5 numbers from 1 to 36.

=== Current multi-jurisdictional drawings ===
==== Lucky for Life ====
Lucky for Life began in Connecticut in 2009 as Lucky-4-Life. The game has undergone several changes while it grew from a one-state game, to a regional game, to a quasi-national game with 25 states and the District of Columbia.

Players choose 5 "white ball" numbers from 1 through 48, and a green "Lucky Ball" from a second set of numbers, 1 through 18. Plays are $2 each. Top prize is $1,000 per day for life, while second prize is $25,000 per year for life; both "lifetime" tiers have a cash option. There are 10 prize tiers in all.

==== Lotto America ====
Lotto America is drawn Monday, Wednesday and Saturday evenings. Lotto America began in October 2017, replacing Hot Lotto.

==== Powerball ====
Powerball began in 1992; it added Oklahoma in 2006. Powerball jackpots begin at $40 million; the game is drawn Monday, Wednesday and Saturday evenings at 9:59 p.m. Central Time. Powerball drawings were televised on Fox affiliate KOKH (channel 25) and CW affiliate KOCB (channel 34) in Oklahoma City; and on Cox Communications channel 9 in Tulsa through January 2013. Powerball numbers now are televised via cable superstation WGN America (available on most cable, IPTV and satellite providers in the state; it also carries Mega Millions. Drawings also are available on the Lottery's website.

==== Mega Millions ====
In March 2009, Mega Millions and Powerball began negotiating an agreement to allow each participating U.S. lottery to sell tickets for both games. An agreement was reached on October 13 of that year; two months later, it was announced that Oklahoma would begin selling Mega Millions tickets on January 31, 2010, the cross-selling date. The first Mega Millions drawing with Oklahoma a participant occurred on February 2, 2010. Mega Millions players choose 5 of 70 "white ball" numbers, and a gold-colored "Mega Ball" from a second pool, of 25 numbers. Mega Millions drawings are not televised on any local broadcast television station or local origination cable channel in the Oklahoma City and Tulsa markets; those playing Mega Millions instead see the winning numbers via WGN America on cable and satellite television or on the lottery's website.

=== Former drawing games ===
==== Pick 4 ====
Pick 4 launched in July 2011. Players were required to choose a set of four digits 0 through 9, either selected by the player, or selected by the lottery terminal. On September 7, 2013, the Lottery announced that it would discontinue Pick 4; its final drawing was seven days later.

=== Scratchers ===
The first Oklahoma Lottery tickets were scratch tickets; four such tickets were introduced on October 12, 2005, with price points of $1, $2, and $5. "Lucky 7's" was among these scratch tickets.

=== Jackpot winners ===
In June 2006, the Oklahoma Lottery had its first jackpot winner when an Oklahoman won $101 million in Powerball. The Powerball drawing of June 27, 2007 produced Oklahoma's second winning jackpot ticket for the game, and the largest to date: $105.8 million (annuitized). It was bought in the Sequoyah County town of Roland. Muldrow residents Don and Joyce Harvey (a married couple that at the time were respectively 64 and 50 years old) claimed the prize on June 29, 2007; they chose the cash option, and received approximately $33.7 million after withholdings.

July 2, 2008 produced one jackpot winner in Oklahoma for not only Powerball, but also Hot Lotto. It was the first time that the same jurisdiction provided at least one jackpot winner in both games on the same day.

== The Oklahoma Lottery game show ==
The Lottery produced a game show (simply titled The Oklahoma Lottery Game Show) that was taped in Oklahoma City (and produced by Sande Stewart), which aired on KOCB in Oklahoma City, and Cox Communications cable channel 9 in Tulsa from October 13, 2007 to October 4, 2008. The show, which was hosted by Brad Morris and Amber Dickinson, was introduced to combat lower than expected sales as a result of the Lottery not offering video lottery or keno games. Players on the game show were guaranteed to win $500 each, and could win over $50,000. The second and succeeding shows included a "returning champion". The program was cancelled due to low ratings; the final episode was taped on August 20, 2008.
