= Oregon Lottery =

American state-run lottery

- Oregon Lottery logo
- First draw: 1985
- Operator: State of Oregon
- Number of games: Powerball, Mega Millions, scratch-offs.
- Website: www.oregonlottery.org

The Oregon Lottery is run by the government of the U.S. state of Oregon.

== History ==
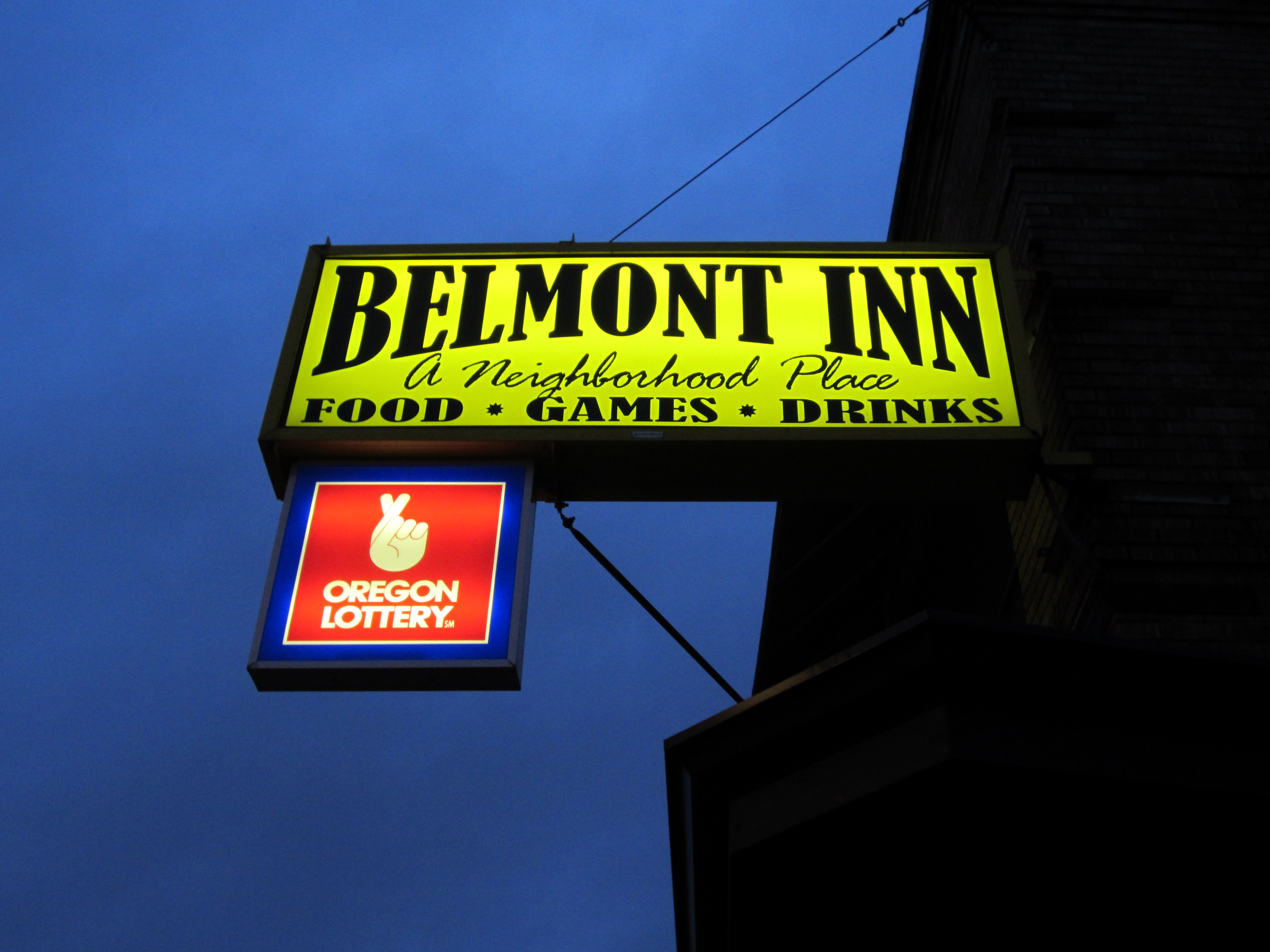
Oregon Lottery signage at a bar in Southeast Portland

The Oregon Lottery was authorized by “Oregon Ballot Measure 5” which was passed by voters in the 1984 general election. The measure amended the Oregon Constitution to allow a state lottery to be created. The Lottery began in April 1985; eventually offering two types of games: scratch-it tickets, and a drawing game, Megabucks. The Lottery has introduced many games, while removing those that were not successful. In fiscal year 2006, the Lottery's sales reached $1 billion for the first time.

== Games offered ==
The following games (including those retired) have been offered by the Lottery:

- In 1985, Megabucks, an in-house jackpot game, was introduced. In 1990, Megabucks became the first US lottery game to give players a choice of lump sum or annuity, should they win the top prize. It has become Oregon Lottery's flagship game, and is referred to in promotional advertising as "Oregon's Game".
- In 1985, Scratch-it games were introduced.
- In 1987, "Breakopen" games were introduced; they were discontinued in 2009.
- In 1988, as a charter member of Multi-State Lottery Association, Oregon helped launch Lotto*America, which became Powerball in 1992. Four Powerball jackpots have been won in Oregon; a $38.4 million winner from Eugene in 1992; a $33.8 million winner from Beaverton in 1999; a family from Jacksonville won a then-record $340 million jackpot in 2005; and in March 2007 a man from Milwaukie, won a $182.7 million jackpot. Powerball's cash option began in 1997.
- In 1989, the lottery added Sports Action, a parlay game that enabled betting on National Football League (NFL) games. In 1989, National Basketball Association (NBA) games were added (excluding games involving the Oregon-based Portland Trail Blazers); wagering on basketball was discontinued in 1990. In 2005, a bill was signed that ended football wagering at the conclusion of the 2006–2007 NFL season.
- In 1991, a keno game began.
- In 1992, the Lottery began video lottery games that included versions of draw poker. Video lottery games are a type of slot machine known as a Video Lottery Terminal.
- In 2001, Win for Life, which awards its top prize as a lifetime weekly annuity, was introduced; unlike the other U.S. "lifetime payout" draw games (Cash4Life and Lucky for Life; the latter available in Idaho beginning January 27, 2015) there is no cash option for Oregon WFL top-prize winners.
- In 2005, traditional slot machine games were added to the video terminals.
- In 2006, the tic-tac-toe-style game, Lucky Lines, was launched by the Lottery.
- In 2009, the first raffle drawing was conducted.
- In 2010, Oregon added Mega Millions.
- In 2011, Oregon's video lottery added Platinum Spin Series games with prizes over $600.
- in 2025, the Oregon lottery added the cash pop game to its lineup.

== Profits ==
The allocation of lottery profits is determined by Oregon voters, who approve the broad categories that may receive Oregon Lottery funds. Constitutional amendments have allowed using lottery funds for economic development (Oregon Ballot Measure 4 in 1984), public education (Oregon Ballot Measure 21 in May 1995) and natural resource programs (Oregon Ballot Measure 66 in 1998). In 2016, Oregon voter approved Measure 96 that amended the state constitution to set aside 1.5 percent of Oregon's lottery funds for veterans programs. Measure 96 passed with 84 percent of voters in favoring the amendment. The Oregon State Legislature and Governor appropriate the remainder of lottery funds within those categories during each legislative session.

As of 2012, over $5 billion of lottery proceeds have gone to public education, $2 billion to economic development, $900 million to natural resources (including Oregon State Parks and watersheds), and over $50 million for problem gambling treatment programs.

== Problem gambling ==
Oregon dedicates about 1% of lottery proceeds for problem gambling prevention and treatment programs.

== Controversy ==
Like other U.S. lotteries (and gambling in general), the Oregon Lottery has drawn its share of controversy. Topics of debate include: the morality of legalized, government-sponsored gambling; the disproportionate economic impact that gambling (of all kinds) has on the poor; and, the suitability of lottery dollars as an alternative (to taxes) revenue source. Several issues have been unique to Oregon, however.

In 2009, the lottery was criticized for calling its most frequent players "loyal customers", when many of them may in fact be problem gamblers that contribute a large percentage of revenues.

Other controversies include the 1992 introduction of video poker machines, which may be installed in a wide number of locations, such as bars and other adults-only establishments.

=== Sports Action ===
In 1989, the lottery added Sports Action, a parlay game allowing wagers on National Football League (NFL) games. The reaction from the sports world was negative. The NFL was highly displeased by this move, though legally powerless to stop the Oregon Lottery as the game took care to avoid infringing upon any NFL trademark (no NFL team names were used; NFL teams were identified by city). They even stated that Oregon would never have an NFL team as long as the betting continued. The revenues were used to provide funding to intercollegiate athletics in the state.

In 1990, National Basketball Association (NBA) games were added (excluding games involving the Portland Trail Blazers.) This prompted a lawsuit from the NBA; however, betting on basketball did not prove financially viable, and the lottery discontinued NBA betting the following year (settling the lawsuit with the NBA thereafter). Still, wagering on football proved highly successful for Oregon, bringing in over $2 million yearly in proceeds. The National Collegiate Athletic Association (NCAA), long opposed to sports betting, took the position that no post-season basketball games (which are played at neutral sites) would be held in Oregon so long as Sports Action was available; the NBA criticized Oregon even after its wagering on NBA games was discontinued.

Many proponents of the lottery rebuffed such criticism, noting that the Oregon Lottery, with a maximum wager of $20, was "small potatoes" compared to the Las Vegas sports book and the various illegal sports books throughout the country. Further, it had been pointed out that the overwhelming popularity of the NCAA Men's Division I Basketball Championship is driven by office pools and other forms of gambling.

In 1997, a bill was introduced to eliminate the lottery game, but was not enacted into law. In 2005, House Bill 3466 was passed by the Oregon State Legislature and signed into law by Governor Ted Kulongoski; this bill outlawed Sports Action game as of the conclusion of the 2006–2007 NFL season. As a result, the Rose Garden arena was awarded regional games in the 2009 NCAA men's basketball tournament.

== See also ==
- Gambling in Oregon
