= South Dakota Lottery =

Agency overview
- Jurisdiction: South Dakota
- Headquarters: Pierre, South Dakota
- Annual budget: no tax money is used
- Agency executives: Bob Hartford, Pierre, Chairman; Doyle Estes, Hill City, Vice Chairman
- Parent agency: State of South Dakota
- Website: lottery.sd.gov

The South Dakota Lottery is run by the government of South Dakota. It is a member of the Multi-State Lottery Association (MUSL). The Lottery is headquartered in Pierre; it is a self-funded endeavor. The minimum age to buy tickets is 18; however, video lottery players must be at least 21.

== History ==
- November 4, 1986: South Dakota voters approve a constitutional amendment a lottery.
- April 2, 1987: The bill to create the Lottery was signed
- October 16, 1989: Video lottery is established
- April 19, 1992: Powerball begins
- November 1992 Voters reject a plan to repeal video lottery
- June 22, 1994: Supreme Court rules video lottery is unconstitutional
- August 13, 1994: Video lottery machines shut down pursuant to court order
- November 8, 1994: Voters approve constitutional amendment to re-authorize video lottery
- November 22, 1994: Video lottery restored
- 2000: Voters rejected for a second time to repeal video lottery.
- 2006: Voters again rejected repealing video lottery.
- May 16, 2010, South Dakota joins Mega Millions
- January 15, 2012: Enhanced Powerball game begins
- October 19, 2013: Current version of Mega Millions begins
- June 4, 2017: Lucky for Life adds South Dakota

== Games ==
South Dakota's games include:

- Multi-state:
  - Lucky for Life
  - Powerball
  - Mega Millions
  - Lotto America
- South Dakota only:
  - Dakota Cash (5/35)
  - Scratch-offs (each ticket costing $1 to $20)
  - Raffle (first drawing in 2007)
  - Video lottery

=== Dakota Cash ===
Dakota Cash is drawn Wednesdays and Saturdays. It draws 5 numbers from 1 through 35. Jackpots begin at $20,000. Each game is $1.

=== Lucky for Life ===
In 2009, the Connecticut Lottery began a game then called Lucky-4-Life. It eventually became a regional game, taking on its current name. In 2013, Lucky for Life added a second "lifetime" prize tier and began allowing such prizes to be paid in cash. In 2015, LFL further expanded into a quasi-national game. With South Dakota joining on June 4, 2017, LFL now is offered in 23 states and the District of Columbia.

Lucky for Life players choose five white balls numbered 01 through 48 and one green "Lucky Ball" numbered 01 through 18. LFL continues to be drawn in Connecticut with numbered balls and two classic-style drawing machines.

=== Lotto America ===
This game began in November 2017, replacing hot lotto. The current version is played by picking 5 numbers from 52 for the main numbers and 1 number from 10 for the star ball number. Jackpots in this version start at $2,000,000 and grow from there. The game costs $1 to play just like its predecessor from the late 1980s. The game has 9 ways to win and has an “all star bonus” feature that allows players to increase non jackpot winnings up to 5 times for $1 more per game. The jackpot is payable on a financial annuity over 30 years or in an available cash option (both payments are before taxes and deducted from the amount).

=== Powerball ===
Since 1990, South Dakota has been a member of MUSL. Powerball began in 1992. Its jackpots begin at $40 million; it also is drawn Wednesdays and Saturdays.

=== Mega Millions ===
On October 13, 2009, the Mega Millions consortium and MUSL reached an agreement in principle to cross-sell Mega Millions and Powerball in US lottery jurisdictions. Most lotteries with either game prior to January 31, 2010 added the other on that date. South Dakota joined Mega Millions on May 16, 2010.
