= Midwest Millions =

American scratchcard game

Midwest Millions is an American scratchcard game that began on September 7, 2007, in Iowa and Kansas, administered by the Multi-State Lottery Association.

== Overview ==
Midwest Millions originally became available in Kansas at the State Fair in Hutchinson and then throughout Kansas on September 13. It was the US's first multi-jurisdictional scratch game since the Powerball scratch ticket in the early 2000s. Both $500,000 prizes were won on tickets bought in Iowa, although one of the winners was from Nebraska.

A total of 1.2 million tickets were offered, split evenly between Iowa and Kansas. The game's biggest prize, $500,000 cash, was won in both second-chance drawings. The first drawing was held in January 2008 in Topeka, Kansas; Because of the success of the first series, another version was announced to start in April 2008.
