= Lucky for Life =

Lottery drawing game

- Region: 22 states and the District of Columbia
- First draw: 2009
- Final draw: February 21, 2026
- Highest jackpot: $1,000 a day for life
- Odds of winning jackpot: 1 in 30,821,472
- Website: luckyforlife.us

Lucky for Life (LFL) was a lottery drawing game. As of June 28, 2021, it was available in 22 states and the District of Columbia. LFL, which began in 2009 in Connecticut as Lucky-4-Life, became a New England–wide game three years later. Another 11 lotteries joined FLF in 2015. LFL's slogan was "The Game of a Lifetime". Drawings were performed by the Multi-State Lottery Association (MUSL) using a digital drawing system to pick the numbers. LFL was drawings were held nightly at approximately 10:30 p.m. Eastern Time.

LFL was modified on September 17, 2013, adding a second "lifetime" prize tier and a cash option for either annuity tier; it was modified again in January 2015 to its final format. Each LFL play cost $2.

In 2015, Montana joined on January 29, followed by the District of Columbia on February 15 (the first member added without changing the game's double matrix). Kentucky joined on March 22, and Ohio on November 15. In 2016, Iowa joined on January 24, North Carolina on February 7, North Dakota on February 26, Colorado on July 17, Kansas on November 15, andWyoming on December 4. In 2017, South Dakota joined on June 4, and Nebraska on August 20. In 2018, Oklahoma joined on February 25. These additions gave LFL 23 members.

As of June 28, 2021, Missouri, South Carolina, and Minnesota had withdrawn from LFL, with Missouri switching to the Multi State Cash4Life game.

In October 2025, the MUSL announced it would replace both Cash4Life and Lucky for Life with a new lifetime-prize game, Millionaire for Life, in early 2026. The drawdown for Lucky for Life, or the elimination of available multi-draws, commenced on January 24, 2026. The final drawing was held on February 21, 2026. The fixed-jackpot Millionaire for Life, which offers a $1 million annuity option (paid out over a guaranteed minimum of 20 years), replaced LFL and Cash4Life in 30 of the successor game's initial 31 jurisdictions on February 22. Delaware was the only Lucky for Life jurisdiction that elected not to transition to Millionaire for Life upon launch. It was also one of four jurisdictions offering either predecessor. The other three were Cash4Life participants.

== First and second-prize payouts ==
Lucky for Life had multiple prize levels, two of which were advertised as "lifetime" prizes. Beginning with the 2013 game modification, a first-prize winner could choose cash or a lifetime annuity; second-prize winners were also offered a cash option. If the annuity was chosen, a first-prize winner received or shared, the equivalent of "$365,000 a YEAR, FOR LIFE" (the timing of the payments was determined by the rules applicable where the ticket was sold), with a 20-year guarantee; if the winner died, payments continued to the winner's estate. Second prize was $25,000 a year for life.

The original Connecticut-only version used 4 of 39 white balls and 1 of 19 green balls; hence the name Lucky-4-Life. The format changed to 5/40 + 1/21 when the game adopted its final name. During 2013 game modification, each of the two drums had 43 balls, corresponding to a selection matrix of 5/43 + 1/43. This modification also introduced a new second "lifetime" prize tier and a cash option.

This 5/43 + 1/43 version never produced a top-prize-winning ticket. In January 2015, LFL used a double matrix, consisting of 5 of 48 white balls and 1 of 18 green "Lucky Balls". The first top-prize-winning ticket under this final matrix was sold in South Carolina for the November 19, 2015, drawing. The winner of this ticket, who claimed the prize anonymously under SCEL rules, was also the first winner to choose cash instead of the annuity. Previous top-prize winners are receiving their payments under the game's pre-2013 rules.

== Participating lotteries ==
Map of U.S. states and territories offering Lucky for Life, as of November 2022

22 states and D.C. participated in LFL when it was discontinued. Three states participated in the LFL but have since withdrawn.

Members	Joined
Arkansas	January 27, 2015
Colorado	July 17, 2016
Connecticut †	2009
Delaware	January 27, 2015
District of Columbia	February 15, 2015
Idaho	January 27, 2015
Iowa ‡	January 24, 2016
Kansas	November 15, 2016
Kentucky	March 22, 2015
Maine	March 3, 2012
Massachusetts	March 15, 2012
Michigan	January 27, 2015
Montana	January 27, 2015
Nebraska ‡	August 20, 2017
New Hampshire	2012
North Carolina	February 7, 2016
North Dakota	February 26, 2016
Ohio	November 15, 2015
Oklahoma	February 25, 2018
Rhode Island	2012
South Dakota	June 4, 2017
Vermont	2012
Wyoming	December 4, 2016

† Original member; the game started as Lucky-4-Life. Connecticut continued to host the drawings.

‡ The minimum age to play LFL in Iowa was 21, while in Nebraska it was 19; elsewhere it was 18.

== Former members ==
Missouri ended sales of LFL on April 8, 2021, and switched to Cash4Life three days later.

South Carolina and Minnesota left LFL after the drawing on June 28, 2021.

== See also ==
- Cash4Life, a similar game offered in Florida, Georgia, Indiana, Maryland, Missouri, New Jersey, New York, Pennsylvania, Tennessee, and Virginia
