= Multi-State Lottery Association =

Nonprofit that facilitates the operation of multi-jurisdictional lottery games in the US

Map of U.S. states and territories which are part of the Multi-State Lottery Association

The Multi-State Lottery Association (MUSL) is an American non-profit, government-benefit association owned and operated by agreement of its 34 member lotteries. MUSL was created to facilitate the operation of multi-jurisdictional lottery games, most notably Powerball.

MUSL was formed in December 1987, by seven U.S. lotteries. Its first game was launched in February 1988, Lotto America. That game was changed to Powerball; its first drawing was in April 1992. Powerball was a unique game using two drums, suggested to MUSL by Steve Caputo of the Oregon Lottery.

== Powerball/Mega Millions cross-selling ==
On October 13, 2009, MUSL signed an agreement with the consortium of states that operated the similar Mega Millions lottery, which allowed MUSL members to sell Mega Millions tickets and consortium members to sell Powerball tickets. On January 31, 2010, all but 2 of the 12 Mega Millions consortium lotteries began selling Powerball tickets. The consortium members did not join MUSL; they were licensed by MUSL to sell Powerball, and the consortium coordinates their Powerball participation with MUSL. Likewise, MUSL members may offer Mega Millions through a special MUSL product group that coordinates with the Mega Millions consortium.

Before the agreement, the only places that sold both Mega Millions and Powerball tickets were retailers that sat on state lines and offered multiple lotteries; one retailer on U.S. Route 62 straddling Sharon, Pennsylvania and Masury, Ohio sold both Mega Millions (via the Ohio Lottery) and Powerball (via the Pennsylvania Lottery) before the agreement and continues to be the only retailer to sell tickets for both states' lotteries.

As of 2016, Powerball and Mega Millions were both offered in 46 jurisdictions, including the District of Columbia and the U.S. Virgin Islands. Powerball is also offered in Puerto Rico, where Mega Millions is not currently offered.

Powerball began to be offered in the United Kingdom in July 2026.

== Other games ==
Besides Powerball, MUSL operates the Lotto America, 2by2 and Millionaire for Life draw games.

Millionaire for Life, a fixed-jackpot draw game offering a $1 million annuity payout (with a minimum guaranteed payout over 20 years for winners who take the annuity option) and higher odds of winning, launched on February 22, 2026, replacing the separate annuity jackpot draws Cash4Life and Lucky for Life in 30 of the initial 31 jurisdictions. (Delaware, Florida, Maryland and Missouri chose not to transition over from either predecessor to Millionaire for Life upon launch, while Mississippi offered neither draw before joining MFL.)

MUSL has retired several draw games, including Hot Lotto, Wild Card, Daily Millions, the original Lotto*America, and the Powerball scratchcard game; the latter was tied to a weekly television game show produced for two years in Hollywood, California called Powerball: The Game Show (hosted by Bob Eubanks); then for two years from the Venetian Hotel in Las Vegas, called Powerball Instant Millionaire (hosted by Todd Newton).

In September 2007, MUSL launched Midwest Millions, a scratch ticket game, in Iowa and Kansas; it was the country's first multi-jurisdictional scratch game since the Powerball television game shows. Midwest Millions returned in 2008 and 2009.

Ca$hola, a video lottery game operated by MUSL, was retired on May 15, 2011, when its 37th jackpot was won. A replacement multi-jurisdictional video lottery game, MegaHits, began on July 15, 2011, in Delaware, Rhode Island, and West Virginia, the three lotteries which offered Ca$hola; MegaHits was then added in Maryland and Ohio. MegaHits ended on July 31, 2018.

== Services ==
MUSL provides a variety of services for lotteries, including game design, management of game finances, production and up-linking of drawings, the development of common minimum information technology and security standards and inspections of lottery vendor sites; the building of a quantum-based random number generator (RNG), coordination of common promotions and advertisements, coordination of public relations, and emergency back-drawing sites for lottery games. MUSL also hosts the Powerball website and the websites for more than a dozen U.S. lotteries. The Powerball website averages over 350,000 pageviews per day (over 10.5 million monthly.) MUSL provides these services to the lotteries at no cost. MUSL earns its income from non-game sources such as earnings on its accounts, bond swaps, and licensing of its trademarks. MUSL owns the patents and trademarks involved in its operations, holding them for the benefit of its members.

MUSL games operate under the same core game rules in each jurisdiction; however, each lottery is free to vary rules pertaining to such things as purchase age, the claim period, and some validation processes.

== Hot Lotto fraud scandal ==
In December 2010, a jackpot-winning ticket for the Hot Lotto jackpot was purchased near MUSL headquarters. However, the ticket was not claimed until just before the Iowa Lottery's one-year deadline. At that time, an attorney from New York state attempted to claim the jackpot on behalf of a Belize trust. The trust later decided not to pursue the claim, to avoid revealing the purchaser's identity.

In January 2015, Edward Tipton, MUSL's Director of Information Security, was arrested. Authorities determined that he was the purchaser by reviewing a convenience store's video footage. In March 2015, a second man, Robert Rhodes, from Texas, was arrested in connection to the fraud.

Tipton was convicted in July 2015 of two counts of fraud and sentenced to 10 years in prison. He posted $10,000 bond and was released pending appeal. Authorities suspected that Tipton rigged drawings in at least four states, and as a result of their investigation he was charged in October 2015 for crimes in 2005 and 2007.

Eddie Tipton was sentenced to 25 years in an Iowa court in 2017 for gaming multiple lotteries by installing a rootkit in the computer running the RNG used by MUSL for the drawings. The rootkit changed the behavior of the RNG, allowing Tipton to predict the numbers that would be drawn. The MUSL gaming software had been approved by Gaming Laboratories International.

== Members ==
MUSL's membership consists of 38 lotteries (including those of the District of Columbia, Puerto Rico, and the Virgin Islands) which offered Powerball prior to the January 31, 2010 beginning of cross-selling with the 12 lotteries operating Mega Millions. Mississippi became the 35th state to join in 2019, with ticket sales planned for 2020.

The 38 MUSL members, alphabetically (and when joined):

- Arizona (1994)
- Arkansas (2009)
- Colorado (2001)
- Connecticut (1995)
- Delaware (1991)
- District of Columbia (1988)
- Florida (2009)
- Idaho (1990)
- Indiana (1990)
- Iowa (1988)
- Kansas (1988)
- Kentucky (1991)
- Louisiana (1995)
- Maine (1990–1992 and 2004–present)
- Minnesota (1990)
- Mississippi (2019)
- Missouri (1988)
- Montana (1989)
- Nebraska (1994)
- New Hampshire (1995)
- New Mexico (1996)
- New York (2019)
- North Carolina (2006)
- North Dakota (2004)
- Ohio (2002)
- Oklahoma (2006)
- Oregon (1988)
- Pennsylvania (2002)
- Puerto Rico (2014)
- Rhode Island (1988)
- South Carolina (2002)
- South Dakota (1990)
- Tennessee (2004)
- Texas (1992)
- US Virgin Islands (2002)
- Vermont (2003)
- West Virginia (1988)
- Wisconsin (1989)
