= New Jersey Lottery =

Government agency of the US state of New Jersey

New Jersey Lottery Commission
Agency overview
- Formed: November 20, 1969
- Jurisdiction: State of New Jersey, U.S.
- Headquarters: Lawrence Park Complex 1333 Brunswick Avenue Circle Trenton, NJ 08648
- Motto: Anything Can Happen in Jersey
- Employees: 100
- Agency executives: James Carey, Executive Director; Robert J. D'Anton, Chairman; Ian K. Leonard, Vice Chair
- Parent agency: New Jersey Department of the Treasury
- Key document: N.J.S.A 5:9-1
- Website: NJLottery.com

The New Jersey Lottery is run by the U.S. state of New Jersey. Its In-house draw games are Pick-3, Pick-4, Jersey Cash 5, Pick-6, Quick Draw, and Cash Pop. Its multi-jurisdictional draw games are Cash4Life, Mega Millions, and Powerball. The Lottery also sells Fast Play and scratch-off tickets. The New Jersey Lottery is headquartered at One Lawrence Park Complex in Lawrence Township, Mercer County.

== Current draw games ==
=== In-house draw games ===
==== Pick-3 ====
Pick-3 is a three-digit draw game drawn twice daily. It began on May 22, 1975, as a daily game and the nation's first game where players can choose their own numbers and play type. Midday drawings were introduced in November 2001. It was originally known as Pick-it; the name changed to Pick-3 in 1987 to distinguish from the newer Pick-4 game.

The ways to win, in the order of payouts from highest to lowest, are:

- Straight – Match all three digits exactly as they are drawn.
- Wheel – Match all three digits in any order and win the Straight prize. This play type multiplies the wager amount by the number of straight combinations covered.
- Box – Match all three digits in any order.
- Straight/Box – Match the winning numbers in the exact order to win the straight and the box prizes. Match the winning numbers in any order to win the box prize.
- Pair – Match the first two or the last two numbers (depending on the specific pair selected) in the exact order to win.

Plays in pick 3 range from $0.50 to $5 and prizes range from $25 to $2,500 depending on the player's choice of play type and wager amount for each game.

As of November 14, 2022, the New Jersey Lottery pays winners fixed prize amounts to players who have pick 3 tickets that match the winning numbers for the play type they choose. Prizes in pick 3 were awarded on a parimutuel basis prior to the November 14th, 2022 drawings.

==== Pick-4 ====
Pick-4 is a four-digit draw game also drawn twice daily. It was introduced as a weekly game on July 9, 1977, became a daily game, and has been a twice-daily game since November 2001.

Price and play options for pick 4 are the same as the pick 3 game with prizes ranging from $25 to $25,000 depending on the player's choice for play type and how much they will pay for the game. The prizes are paid on a fixed basis as of November 14, 2022. Prior to November 14, 2022, players won a prize that was awarded to them on a parimutuel basis.

===== Fireball =====
On February 27, 2017, the Fireball feature was added to Pick-3 and Pick-4, replacing a play type that the NJ Lottery offered until February 19, 2017, called "So Close". This Fireball feature gives players an additional opportunity to create winning combinations. With Fireball, players can replace one of the Lottery drawn Pick-3 or Pick-4 winning numbers with the Fireball number drawn for more ways to win, for example, if a player placed a 3-6-8 Straight bet and the winning numbers were 2-6-8 and the Fireball number was 3, the player would swap out the first number 2 with the Fireball number to match the numbers 3-6-8 and win the Fireball prize.

In addition, player matching the winning numbers for their play type and the fireball number is the same as one of their numbers and the player matches the winning fireball combinations win the base game and any fireball prizes for each fireball combination for that play type (for example if a player placed a 1-2-2-7 Straight bet with the fireball feature and the winning numbers were 1-2-2-7 and the fireball number was 2, they would win 3 times). Adding Fireball doubles the cost of the play and can be added to any pick 3 or pick 4 play type.

==== Green Ball ====
During the four sweep months per year, Green Ball is a featured add-on companion to the evening Pick-3 drawings. A separate machine is used containing six white balls and one green ball. If a white ball is drawn, it will be removed from the machine for the next drawing. If the green ball is drawn, a second Pick-3 drawing is held giving playsrs a second chance to win from the same wager.

==== Jersey Cash 5 Xtra ====
Jersey Cash 5 is a daily game that draws five balls numbered from 1 through 45. Drawings are held nightly, and the cost is $2 per game. The top prize (matching all five numbers drawn) is a progressive jackpot that starts at an estimated $100,000. The jackpot increases each day until a wager matches all five numbers drawn. The jackpot amount is shared between each winning ticket if there is more than one.

Jersey Cash 5 began on September 20, 1992, as a pick-5-of-38 game. Players won a parimutuel prize by matching at least three numbers. The original version of Jersey Cash 5 did not have a rolling jackpot; instead, if no set of five numbers was a perfect match, the first-prize pool was added to second prize winners (those who matched four of five numbers). In September 2003, two numbers were added to make Jersey Cash 5 a 5/40 game, and the top prize level was changed to a progressive jackpot.

On September 14, 2014, Jersey Cash 5 increased its field of numbers from 40 to 43 and became a 5/43 game. Its estimated starting jackpot prize was also increased – from $50,000 to $75,000. On June 29, 2020, the starting jackpot was increased from $75,000 to $100,000 and increased its field of numbers from 43 to 45.

On October 3, 2016, the "Xtra" feature was added to Jersey Cash 5. This feature gives players the opportunity to multiply their non-jackpot winnings up to five times by matching three or four out of five numbers. If a player matches two out of five numbers with the "Xtra" feature, they win $2.

On July 1, 2024, Jersey Cash 5 went through some major changes which include a change in the ticket price to $2 per play, the addition of the new Bullseye feature which allows players to win additional money for matching three and four numbers with the last number being the bullseye number and the starting jackpot will increase to $150,000 and grow from there. The game's instant match feature has also been discontinued in honor of the new format, but the "Xtra" feature will continue as an optional add on to the game.

==== Pick-6 ====
Pick-6 is drawn on Monday and Thursday evenings. It draws six numbers from 1 through 46. Games cost $2 each. The jackpot begins at $2 million annuity and increases by at least $100,000 per rollover until there is a 6-of-6 winner (the jackpot prize is paid in a financial annuity over 30 years or the jackpot winner can choose the available cash option for such annuity). The game requires players to choose how they want to be paid if they win the jackpot prize while playing the game.

Pick-6 began on May 9, 1980, as one of the first games of its kind in the US. It originally was a pick-6 (hence the name) of 36 numbers. Players paid $1 for each game; a winning ticket needed at least four correct numbers in a game. In June 1984, it was changed to 6/39, then in February 1986, later went to a 6/42 matrix, followed by an additional change to 6/46, in January 1989; making even higher jackpots possible. Until 2000, drawings included a five-digit "bonus" number; an exact match entered the player into a special drawing where the top prize was $50,000 yearly in 20 installments, with no cash option. (Although the Pick-6 cash option began in 1997, it applied only to the "regular" game; choosing "cash" on a betslip, then winning the top prize in the "bonus" drawing, still meant receiving mandatory annuity payments.)

In September 2000, Pick-6 adopted the 6/49 format, adding a $3 prize for matching three numbers. Matching at least four numbers has always won a parimutuel prize.

On January 22, 2015, Pick-6 added its "XTRA" option (an additional $1 per play per drawing). Matching five, four, or three of the six numbers means the basic parimutuel prize is multiplied by the "XTRA" number. The "XTRA" feature originally awarded a $2 prize for matching two of the six numbers drawn.

On April 7, 2022, the game matrix scaled back to the 6/46 matrix, the price increased to $2 per play and a new feature called Double Play added to the game, giving players additional chance to win up to $250,000, with other prizes being reduced. In addition to that, the XTRA multiplier turned into an instant multiplier on every purchased ticket, and a new 10x multiplier number added, which gives players the chance to multiply any non jackpot prizes up to 10 times, both for the regular Pick-6 and Double Play drawings.

On July 12, 2025, the New Jersey lottery added a Saturday drawing to allow for more excitement in the game with bigger jackpots to happen more frequently.

==== Quick Draw ====
Quick Draw is a keno-style draw game which was launched on July 17, 2017. The game is drawn every four minutes from 5:00 a.m. to 2:00 a.m. Players choose 1 to 10 numbers (spots) per play. It is drawn using a random number generator (RNG). The RNG draws 20 numbers from 1 through 80. Minimum play is $1. The 10-spot option has a top prize of $100,000 ($1 million on a $10 play). Players also have the option of how many consecutive drawings (up to 20) they wish to play. Up until September 30, 2018, Quick Draw was only offered at a limited number of lottery retailers (who have an HDTV monitor) showing each drawing.

On October 1, 2018, Quick Draw's Bullseye feature was launched giving players higher chances of winning. During each drawing, one of the 20 drawn numbers is randomly selected as the Bullseye number. If a player matches the Bullseye number, bigger prizes are won. Players can add Bullseye to each play for double the amount of the bet per draw. On the same day, the Quick Draw ePlayslip was also launched where players can generate a bet slip by selecting their own numbers and bets through the NJ Lottery app. Quick Draw is available through all New Jersey Lottery retailers, with the live drawings displayed on each lottery terminal, HDTV monitors, the NJ Lottery app and website.

On June 7, 2021, the Multiplier feature was launched. This feature gives lottery players the opportunity to multiply their winnings up to 10 times. The Multiplier drawing takes place prior to each draw. The cost to add the Multiplier to each play costs double the wager.

==== Cash Pop ====
The game launched on September 30, 2019. Players select how much to wager; $1, $2, $5, or $10. Players choose from 1 to 15 numbers; the "cover all" option guarantees a win. One number from 1 through 15 is drawn by an RNG. Players can win anywhere from 5 to 250 times their wager, with prizes ranging from $5 to $2,500. Winning numbers are shown on each lottery terminal, HDTV monitors, the New Jersey Lottery app, and website. Since Monday, June 27, 2022, Cash Pop drawings take place every 4 minutes instead of every 15 minutes.

==== Instant Games ====
Since June 16, 1975, the New Jersey has offered numerous scratchcard games, called "Instant Games", with various price points, prizes, formats and themes.

==== Fast Play ====
The Lottery offered a form of instant win game known as Instant Match. Available as a $1 add-on to Pick-3, Pick-4 and Jersey Cash 5 tickets, the lottery terminal's random number generator produced a same-sized set of numbers to the main game. If any of the randomly generated numbers match the ticket's chosen numbers, the player wins the indicated prize amount.

In 2015, this was replaced by a series of games known as Fast Play, which are instant games similar to a scratchcard, but generated by the lottery terminal. Cost and prize values vary between games. One game, Jersey Jackpot features a progressive jackpot.

=== Multi-jurisdictional games ===
==== Mega Millions ====
On September 6, 1996, six lotteries began a multi-jurisdictional game, then known as The Big Game. In May 1999, the New Jersey Lottery became its first additional member. The game became known as The Big Game Mega Millions in May 2002; a short time later, The Big Game was dropped from the name. Mega Millions' starting jackpots is $15 million; a cash option is available.

On January 31, 2010, many MUSL members (until then offering only Powerball) joined Mega Millions; likewise, most Mega Millions members added Powerball; New Jersey offered both games as of the cross-sell expansion date.

The Megaplier option, initially available only in Texas, became available to Mega Millions players in New Jersey during January 2011, the deadline for the then 43 Mega Millions members to offer the Megaplier.

Mega Millions currently is played in 44 states, the District of Columbia, and the U.S. Virgin Islands. Mega Millions is drawn live, usually from Atlanta.

The largest prize won on a ticket sold in New Jersey was for the March 26, 2024, Mega Millions drawing. The annuity value of the ticket was approximately $1.128 billion (that was the first time ever that someone in New Jersey won a jackpot of $1 billion or more in the Mega Millions game). The ticket was sold in Neptune Township.

==== Millionaire for Life ====
On February 22, 2026, New Jersey joined 31 other lottery jurisdictions in launching Millionaire for Life, a multi-state daily draw game that replaced Cash4Life. Tickets cost $5 per play, with players selecting five numbers from 1 to 58 and one Millionaire Ball number from 1 to 5. Drawings are held nightly at 11:15 p.m. Eastern Time. The top prize is $1 million per year for life (or an $18 million cash option), while the second prize is $100,000 per year for life (or a $2.2 million cash option).

==== Powerball ====
Powerball is a multi-lottery game which began in 1992. On October 13, 2009, the Mega Millions consortium and Multi-State Lottery Association (MUSL) reached an agreement in principle to cross-sell Mega Millions and Powerball in U.S. lottery jurisdictions. On January 7, 2010, the New Jersey Lottery announced that it would join Powerball, effective January 31, 2010; on that date, the 33 MUSL members were joined by 12 lotteries, including New Jersey's, that offered Mega Millions, although some of the 45 lotteries did not add the "other" game on that date.

On March 13, 2010, New Jersey became the first previously Mega Millions-only jurisdiction to produce a jackpot ticket for Powerball after the cross-sell expansion. The annuity value of the jackpot was over $211 million; the ticket was sold in Morris Plains.

Powerball's basic game has always had a $1 price; a game with the Power Play option (introduced in 2001) costs $2. On January 15, 2012, the most recent format change for Powerball included a price increase; games are $2 each, or $3 with Power Play. The minimum jackpot was doubled, to $40 million; a second-prize game (matching all five white balls, but not also the Powerball) wins $1 million, or $2 million if Power Play was selected.

Powerball is drawn live from Florida Lottery headquarters in Tallahassee, Florida.

=== Retired draw games ===
==== 5 Card Lotto/Cash ====
The original version of the game was called 5 Card Lotto, and was offered from January 11, 1988, to September 18, 1990. It was New Jersey Lottery's response to the initial wave of terminal-based, all-cash, lottery games with a higher prize potential than those offered in Pick-3 and Pick-4 games. Rather than an all-number field, the game used 52 cards from a standard deck of playing cards. The game was drawn twice a week, on Tuesdays and Fridays. The winning combination was the five "cards" (actually marked balls) drawn. Although a "poker-themed" game, poker hands (four of a kind, full house, flush etc.) were not used to determine winning tickets. Instead, any game matching at least three of the five cards won a parimutuel prize. A ticket with any game matching all five cards won (or shared) the cash jackpot, which started at $200,000 and remained there until sales supported a higher top prize. Unusual at the time, 5 Card Lotto drawings were originally broadcast during the early afternoon, before being shifted to evenings.

The game was revived as 5 Card Cash and was offered from May 16, 2016, to May 3, 2020. Each play cost $2 per quick pick and offered two plays with the same set of terminal-generated playing cards. The first play was called "Win Now" which was an instant match game similar to the Fast Play games by matching the cards to a poker hand. Cash prizes ranged from $2 (for a pair of jacks or better) to $5000 (for a royal flush). The second play was called "Win Tonight", where a nightly jackpot drawing similar to the prior version of the game by matching at least two of the five cards drawn via random number generator would win a cash prize. Matching all five drawn cards won $100,000. An additional $1 bet called "All In" added to the prizes for the "Win Now" play, with a royal flush winning an additional progressive jackpot which started at $10,000, while a straight flush added 10% of the jackpot value to the prize.

The New Jersey Lottery officially retired 5 Card Cash as a draw game on October 5, 2020, after being temporarily suspended on May 4, 2020, due to the COVID-19 pandemic. It was ultimately discontinued because of limited player interest. On October 16, 2020, a new poker-themed version of the game was launched as a Fast Play Progressive game. In addition, any remaining amount for the "All In" prize pool was carried forward into the Fast Play progressive Jackpot.

==== Cash4Life ====
On June 13, 2014, New Jersey and New York began sales of Cash4Life, which replaced Sweet Million in New York. Tickets cost $2 per play, and the first drawing was held on June 16, 2014. Initially, drawings were held on Monday and Thursday evenings. Beginning July 1, 2019, Cash4Life transitioned to nightly drawings. The game ultimately expanded to ten participating lotteries. Its final drawing was held on February 21, 2026, when it was retired and replaced by Millionaire for Life.

Players selected 5 of 60 numbers in one field and 1 of 4 green "Cash Ball" numbers in a second field. Drawings were conducted live from Studio B at New Jersey Lottery headquarters at 9:00 p.m. Eastern Time. The top prize was $1,000 per day for life, while the second prize was $1,000 per week for life; both annuity prizes included a lump-sum cash option.

On May 15, 2017, the New Jersey Lottery introduced Doubler NJ, an optional feature available only in New Jersey. For an additional $1 per play, all non-"for Life" prizes were doubled. The feature did not affect either of the game's lifetime-prize tiers.

==== Lotzee ====
Lotzee (stylized LOTZEE) was a game offered from June 14, 1998, to September 13, 2003. Originally drawn once a week on Saturdays, it expanded with a Wednesday drawing before being discontinued. It was unpopular with players, who felt the rules, which featured a combination of player- and machine-selected numbers, were too complex and confusing. The top prize was $500,000 cash; although not a progressive jackpot, the prize was split if there were multiple winners.

Players had to choose 4 numbers from 00 to 76 (00 to 99 prior to 2002).

==== Lottery Bingo ====
Lottery Bingo was a Pick 5 style game. The game ran from February 6, 1980, to July 29, 1981. It was only drawn on Wednesdays. The player needed to choose one number from each letter column (for example: B15 I30 N45 G60 and O75). The drawing used one machine with five bingo cages(the first cage loaded with the B numbers, the second with the I numbers, and so on). Players had to match all five bingo numbers in the exact order to win a prize. There were prizes for matching two, three, or four numbers in the exact order. The prize structure for the game was unknown.

==== Monopoly Millionaires' Club ====
Monopoly Millionaires' Club began on October 19, 2014. Its only jackpot winner was purchased in New Jersey. In December 2014, it was announced that due to low sales among the 23 members, sales of the game were to be suspended.

==== Lucky 7 ====
This game has had a limited run having been played from February 3 through March 10, 1990. The format, prize structure and draw frequency were unknown.

== Cash & Annuity option ==
Unusually, for Pick-6 (as well as for Cash4Life, Mega Millions, and Powerball within New Jersey), players must choose cash or annuity when playing, instead of after winning. The cash option, if chosen, is legally binding; however, a New Jersey-generated annuity ticket that wins an annuity prize in any of these four games can be changed to cash. Such winners are given a 60-day period upon claiming in which to make the choice.

There is no annuity option in Jersey Cash 5, as its jackpot shares are paid in lump sum.

== Drawings ==
The New Jersey Network (NJN) aired live televised drawings twice a day, seven days a week; midday at 12:59 p.m. Eastern Time and nightly at 10:57 p.m. Eastern Time. Also, NJN aired the twice-weekly Mega Millions drawings at 10:59 p.m. Eastern time every Tuesday and Friday night, as well as the Monday, Wednesday and Saturday Powerball drawings at the equivalent time.

On July 1, 2011, the New Jersey Lottery became the first lottery in the nation to stream their drawings, live, from the New Jersey Lottery's headquarters on either the New Jersey Lottery's website or the New Jersey Lottery's Ustream channel. On September 6, 2011, drawings returned to broadcast on television on NJTV on a one-hour tape delay; the live drawings continue to be held at the Lottery's headquarters and broadcast online. On June 4, 2012, the live drawings from the New Jersey Lottery's Ustream channel moved to Livestream.

On January 1, 2013, the New Jersey Lottery drawings returned to broadcast television. The drawings were aired on WLNY (channel 10/55) in northern New Jersey, and WPSG-TV (channel 57), in southern New Jersey, both of which are owned by CBS. These are the first New Jersey Lottery drawings to be aired on commercial television. On July 1, 2014, the New Jersey Lottery live drawings moved to WPIX/channel 11 (New York City) and WPHL/channel 17 (Philadelphia), both of which are formerly owned by Tribune Broadcasting. On the same day, Erica Young (daughter of the late New Jersey Lottery draw host Hela Young) was introduced as the lottery's new draw host.

On May 11, 2018, Erica Young hosted her final New Jersey Lottery drawing, taking on a new position with the Lottery. On the same day, the lottery announced that it would no longer televise midday drawings on WPIX and WPHL. On May 14, 2018, Lauren Berman was introduced as New Jersey Lottery's new draw host.

On June 22, 2020, the New Jersey State Lottery announced that it would no longer broadcast drawings on WPIX and WPHL, but still live stream them on their website, Facebook page, YouTube channel and Livestream. In addition, the evening drawings moved from 7:57 pm to 10:57 pm. The Mega Millions and Powerball drawings continue to broadcast on WABC-TV and WXTV-DT (in Spanish) in New York and WTXF-TV in Philadelphia, although WABC-TV occasionally airs the Powerball drawings, particularly when the Powerball jackpot is significantly high. Due to the COVID-19 pandemic, the live drawings are hosted by unseen announcers.

All New Jersey Lottery drawings are held live from New Jersey Lottery Headquarters at Lawrence Park Complex in Trenton, New Jersey. Pick 3, Pick 4, Fireball, Jersey Cash 5, and Pick 6 are drawn in Studio A. The nightly Cash4Life drawings are held in Studio B. All NJ Lottery Drawings are under the observation of Mercadien P.C., a CPA and Asset Management firm.

Game	Ticket Sales Cutoff	Draw Days	Draw Times
Pick 3 and Pick 4 Fireball ‡	12:53pm and 10:53pm	Twice Daily	12:59pm and 10:57pm
Jersey Cash 5 Xtra ‡	10:53pm	Nightly	10:57pm
Pick 6 ‡	10:53pm	Monday, Thursday and Saturday	10:57pm
Mega Millions †	10:45pm	Tuesday and Friday	11:00pm
Millionaire for Life	10:15pm	Nightly	11:15pm
Powerball †	10:00pm	Monday, Wednesday, and Saturday	10:59pm

‡ Live drawings take place on NJ Lottery's Facebook page and YouTube channel.

† Live drawings take place on WABC-TV, WXTV-DT (in Spanish), and WTXF-TV.

^{L} Live drawings take place only on Livestream.

=== Former hosts ===
- Kaitlyn Cunning
- Lauren Berman
- Carmen Delia-Bryant
- Joe DeRose
- Renai Ellison
- Jacqueline Knox
- Foster Krupa
- Dick LaRossa
- Meredith Orlow (née Parker)
- Erica Young
- Hela Young
