= Richard Lustig =

American lottery winner (died 2018)

Richard Lustig was an American man who came to prominence for winning relatively large prizes in seven state-sponsored lottery games from 1993 to 2010. His prizes totaled over $1 million. He wrote Learn How To Increase Your Chances of Winning the Lottery.

== Life ==
Lustig lived in Orlando, Florida, where he had a career as an entertainment booking agent. He died in 2018 at age 67.

== Publicity ==
Lustig's seven lottery wins have been featured on the financial web site CNN Money.

His book Learn How to Increase Your Chances of Winning the Lottery was ranked #3 on Amazon's self-help book list in 2013.

In an interview with ABC News, Lustig explained that his method is to re-invest all of his winnings back into the lottery. He also recommends using hand-picked sequential numbers and using the same numbers repeatedly.

Personal finance author Zac Bissonnette has characterized Richard Lustig's recommendations as "dangerous", further noting the odds of winning any lotto prize are low and Lustig's advice to play sequential numbers is statistically inferior to selecting random numbers for each drawing. Financial journalist Felix Salmon wrote that given Lustig's habit of using much of his winnings to buy more lotto tickets, it is unclear if he has kept more in prize money than he spent on lotto tickets: "[Lustig] never actually comes out and says that he’s a net winner." CNN Money took their video down after a "firestorm of criticism."

== Wins ==
Lustig's total wins amount to a value of $1,052,205.58 (before taxes). Two of those wins were vacations rather than cash prizes, valued at $8,560.66 total. His first win was in 1993, and the last one in 2010:

- Win 1: $10,000 – January 1993 (scratch-off ticket)
- Win 2: $13,696.03 – August 1997 (Florida Fantasy 5)
- Win 3: "Wheel of Fortune" Holiday trip to Los Angeles – June 2000 (valued at $3,594.66) (scratch-off ticket "2nd chance drawing")
- Win 4: Elvis Holiday trip to Memphis – October 2001 (valued at $4,966) (scratch-off ticket "2nd chance drawing")
- Win 5: $842,152.91 – January 2002 (Florida Mega Money)
- Win 6: $73,658.06 – November 25, 2008 (Florida Fantasy 5)
- Win 7: $98,992.92 – August 9, 2010 (Florida Fantasy 5)
