= Missouri Lottery =

State-run lottery in Missouri

The Missouri Lottery is the state-run lottery in Missouri. It is a charter member of the Multi-State Lottery Association (MUSL). As of 2022, the lottery offers Powerball, Mega Millions, Cash4Life, Lotto, Show Me Cash, Pick 4, Pick 3, Cash Pop, Club Keno, scratchers, and pull-tabs. The minimum age to buy a ticket is 18.

The lottery was approved by voters in 1984 with 70% of the vote; the first sales beginning in 1986. Over $7 billion has been earned from the lottery for education.

== History ==
The Lottery began selling tickets January 20, 1986. An executive director oversees the organization and reports to a five-member commission that is appointed by the governor. Retired Highway Patrol Captain Lester Elder was hired as the director of the Missouri Lottery in November 2022.

In the beginning, Lottery proceeds were directed to Missouri's General Revenue fund. In 1992, voters approved Amendment 11, which earmarked proceeds for public education. All monies since July 1993 have gone to education programs. Proceeds are appropriated by the Legislature.

The Lottery offers Scratchers tickets, plus the online games Missouri Lotto, Club Keno, Pick 3, Pick 4, Show Me Cash, and Powerball. Powerball's former rival, Mega Millions, came to Missouri on January 31, 2010. The $250,000 Scratcher card generated much publicity when unemployed couple Robert Russell and Tracie Rogers won the jackpot in July 2010.

The Lottery's mission: "The Missouri Lottery generates funds to provide educational opportunities for Missouri students, support Missouri businesses and entertain millions."

The minimum age to purchase a Missouri Lottery ticket is 18.

== Lottery games ==
=== Current in-house games ===
==== Club Keno/Keno To Go ====
Club Keno has drawings every four minutes. Traditionally sold in age-controlled environments (often where alcoholic beverages are served), the game is now available at any Missouri Lottery retailer as Keno To Go. Options and prizes vary.

==== Scratchers ====
Scratch cards are the Lottery's most popular games, sold in a large variety of locations from gas stations to sports venues via vending machines. Card prices range from $1 to $50, with the more expensive games having better odds of winning as well as larger prizes. Themed scratchers are common (such as for holidays, promotional tie-ins with St. Louis and Kansas City sports teams, or licensed pop-culture properties) and players are occasionally encouraged to enter specific losing tickets into "second chance" drawings for additional prizes.

==== Pick 3 and Pick 4 ====
These two games are drawn twice daily, every day of the week. Pick 3 draws a 3 digit number and Pick 4 draws a 4 digit number. Prices, options and payouts vary depending on the game type and price of the game.

===== Wild Ball =====
On April 16, 2023, the Missouri State Lottery announced that it would add this feature to its Pick 3 and Pick 4 games, replacing the play type “1off” that it offered until the day before the wild ball feature was introduced. Adding wild ball to a game would allow players to create more unique combinations for their game and win a wild ball prize. The wild ball number is used to replace the numbers drawn by the lottery. Players can also win multiple wild ball prizes on the same play depending on the unique numbers played. Adding wild ball doubles the cost of each game and can be done with any play type that a player chooses. There will be a separate wild ball number drawn for pick 3 and pick 4 with every draw.

==== Show Me Cash ====
Show Me Cash (previously called as Show Me 5) is played daily, drawing five numbers from 1 through 39. Games cost $1 each. Jackpots begin at $50,000, increasing by at least $5,000 until there is a game matching all five numbers.

==== MO Millions ====
MO Millions is an in-state Draw Game that costs $2 per play and includes a built-in Bulls-Eye feature. In this each game, players pick 6 numbers from 1 to 42. Each drawing, one of the 6 winning numbers will be randomly selected as the Bulls-Eye number. Matching this number will increase the prize. MO Millions jackpots start at $1,000,000, and grow until someone win it. The amount that the jackpot grows is dependent on sales, but it will roll by at least $100,000 each drawing. Players also win by matching at least 3 numbers, either without/with the Bulls-Eye number.

For an additional $1 per play, the Double Play feature allows players to play their same numbers in a second drawing, and a chance to win prizes up to $50,000. The Double Play drawings are held immediately following the main drawing.

MO Millions tickets with Double Play are eligible to win any prize in the main MO Millions drawing as well as the Double Play drawing, or both.

Match	Base prize	Double Play	Odds
6 of 6	Jackpot	$50,000	1 : 5,245,786
5 of 5 + Bulls-Eye	$1,500	$2,000	1 : 29,143.26
5 of 5	$750	$1,000	1 : 145,716.28
4 of 5 + Bulls-Eye	$50	$70	1 : 832.66
4 of 5	$25	$35	1 : 1,665.33
3 of 5 + Bulls-Eye	$6	$10	1 : 73.47
3 of 5	$3	$5	1 : 73.47
2 of 5 + Bulls-Eye	$2	$3	1 : 17.81

Overall odds of winning a prize: 1 in 11.74

Drawings are held on Wednesdays and Saturdays at approximately 8:59 p.m.

=== Multi-jurisdictional games ===
==== Cash4Life ====
In 2014, New Jersey and New York launched Cash4Life. Initially drawn Mondays and Thursdays, Cash4Life has been drawn seven nights a week beginning July 1, 2019.

On April 11, 2021, Cash4Life become available in Missouri, becoming the game's 10th member. Three days earlier, Missouri ended sales of the rival game Lucky for Life which remains available in 24 states and the District of Columbia. Games are $2 each.

==== Mega Millions ====
On October 13, 2009, the Mega Millions consortium (then with 12 lotteries) and MUSL (with 33) reached an agreement to cross-sell Mega Millions and Powerball. Missouri joined Mega Millions on January 31, 2010, the cross-sell expansion date.

Mega Millions is drawn Tuesdays and Fridays. Players choose five white balls numbered 1 through 70, and a gold-colored "Mega Ball" numbered 1 through 25. Games are $2 each, or $3 if the Megaplier is chosen. Jackpots begin at $20 million, payable in 30 graduated yearly installments unless the cash option is chosen.

==== Powerball ====
Powerball began in 1992. Its jackpots begin at $20 million, with drawings on Monday, Wednesday, and Saturday nights.

=== Former games ===
==== Missouri Lotto ====
Missouri Lotto was drawn Wednesdays and Saturdays. Six numbers from 1 through 44 were chosen. Players got two games for each $1 wager (games must be played in multiples of two.) The progressive jackpot started at $1,000,000 (annuitized with a cash option) and rolled over in multiples of $100,000 until either game set matches all six of the winning numbers drawn; players won cash by matching at least four of the six numbers in any game. A free ticket with 2 sets of numbers qualifying for the next Lotto draw was won by matching three numbers. The game's 6 of 6, 5 of 6 and 4 of 6 prizes are paid on a pari-mutual basis.

Started on November 4, 2012, the game’s “Doubler” feature was introduced. Some lotto tickets had the words “This is a Lotto Doubler Ticket” printed on them. If players saw those words printed on their lotto tickets, all non jackpot prizes are doubled, and best of all, it’s offered free of charge.

Missouri Lotto ended on October 18, 2025, replaced by the newest game, MO Millions.

==== $100,000 triple play taxes paid ====
This game began as a limited time game on March 31, 2000, and ended on June 30 of that same year. Players will pick 4 Numbers From 1 To 51. After the Players pick their numbers they will get 2 more set of numbers randomly selected by the ticket machine. In total, the player got 3 sets of numbers for each game played for 3 chances to win up to $100,000. The $100,000 prize is taxes paid, hence the name of the game.

==== Fun & Fortune ====
From 1996 to 2002, the Lottery aired a television game show called Fun & Fortune, hosted by Rick Tamblyn (nationally known Geoff Edwards hosted the pilot).

==== Lucky for Life ====
Lucky for Life began in Connecticut in 2009 as Lucky-4-Life. It grew by 2015 to include Missouri, and by 2018 it became available in 25 states and the District of Columbia. Missouri, on April 8, 2021, became the first Lucky for Life member to end sales, switching to Cash4Life three days later.
