= Connecticut Lottery =

Official lottery in Connecticut, US

Connecticut Lottery Corporation
- Connecticut Lottery Corporation logo
- Formation: 1971
- Type: Lottery System
- Headquarters: Wallingford, Connecticut, United States
- Website: www.ctlottery.org

The Connecticut Lottery Corporation, also called the CT Lottery, is the official lottery in Connecticut. It was created in 1971 by then-Gov. Thomas Meskill, who signed Public Act No. 865. The first tickets were sold on February 15, 1972. The Connecticut Lottery offers several in-house drawing games; Connecticut also participates in Mega Millions and Powerball; each are played in 44 states, the District of Columbia, and the U.S. Virgin Islands.

== Current Draw Games ==
Drawings were broadcast on WCCT-TV (channel 20), the CW affiliate in the Hartford/New Haven television market prior to June 30th, 2024. A few days later the Connecticut lottery announced that it would no longer be televising the drawings.

=== Play3 ===
A three-digit numbers game-style game drawn twice daily, with day and night drawings. Tickets can be bought in 50-cent multiples. Bets include straight (all three digits in order), box (all three digits in any order) and pairs (any two digits).

=== Play4 ===
A four-digit numbers game similar to Play3, but with 4 digits.

=== Cash5 ===
Cash5 is a nightly five-number game; it was originally known as Cash Lotto when it debuted in 1992, and was drawn only on Saturdays. The game went to Monday, Wednesday and Saturday by 1995. It became nightly in 1997 and the name was changed to Cash 5. It gives players a chance to win up to $100,000. The basic game is won by players who match at least 3 numbers in any order drawn. The Kicker feature gives players a chance to win an increased non guaranteed-jackpot prize with other prizes available to win on the same game. The name was changed to Cash 5 when the Kicker option was introduced; the game began nightly drawings. Five winning numbers are chosen from 1 to 35. The basic Cash5 game costs $1; for an additional 50 cents, the Kicker option is activated. The Kicker option gives a player more opportunities to win.

=== Lotto! ===
Connecticut's in-house jackpot game, Lotto!, is drawn Tuesdays and Friday nights. Six numbers are drawn from 1 to 44; the 6/44 matrix has been used continuously since 1989, when the game's name was its original name, Connecticut Lotto (without an exclamation point).

The minimum jackpot is $1,000,000 (annuitized; payable in 21 equal yearly installments unless the cash option is chosen.) The jackpot rolls upon the sales of the game (until it is won), with a guaranteed minimum increase in the jackpot of $100,000. The jackpot has the potential to grow to more than $25,000,000. The Biggest jackpot thus far is $25.8 million which was won in November of 2019. Players win by matching at least three of the six numbers drawn; a parimutuel prize is won by matching at least 4 numbers and a guaranteed $2 prize in won for matching 3 numbers.

What is now Lotto! began in 1983 as Connecticut Lotto, a 6/36 game. The matrix was changed to 6/40 in 1986, and to the current 6/44 in 1989(The then-current game logo was 36, 40, or 44 yellow squares forming a rectangle, reflecting the game matrix.). The cash option was added in 1997. The game became Wild Card Lotto in 1998(adding a seventh ball, which was used for additional lower-tier prizes, but not for the jackpot). Due to slumping sales, Wild Card Lotto was dropped and Classic Lotto introduced Memorial Day weekend in 1999.

The name Classic Lotto was retired on Saturday, March 9, 2013 (which did not coincide with it being drawn), as the game's name became Lotto! the next day, although the format was not changed (Lotto! tickets, including Advance Action, purchased on or before March 9, 2013 have "Classic Lotto" printed on them, but were valid for draw(s) under the new name. As the 6/44 matrix was not changed, "Classic Lotto" bet slips can still be used).

=== Keno ===
On April 25, 2016, the CT Lottery began offering Keno. It is drawn at four-minute intervals, with over 300 drawings daily. An agreement with Connecticut's two tribal casinos, Foxwoods and Mohegan Sun, was necessary to allow the Lottery permission to offer Keno; unlike in the two casinos, Lottery keno players need only to be at least 18 years old instead of 21. (The agreement allows Lottery tickets to be sold on tribal property, in areas accessible to those under 21; Mohegan Sun also houses one of Connecticut's "High-Tier Claim Centers" for claiming prizes of $600 to $5,000). Keno wagers may be made at any Connecticut Lottery retailer, although only those in a "social" setting have a monitor for witnessing the computer-drawn numbers.

=== Fast Play ===
On July 20, 2020, the CT Lottery launched a new category of games called Fast Play. Fast Play games are like instant (scratch) games, but are printed on-demand from a CT Lottery retailer terminal or self-serve CT Lottery vending machine. The first family of games is “Jumbo Bucks,” and is available at the $1, $2, and $5 price points. Fast Play progressive games are a series (or family) of games that all share the same name, appearance and playstyle, but are available at different price points (wager amounts). There are no numbers to pick, no play slip needed and no drawings. Each game in a family contributes to ONE progressive jackpot that grows with ticket sales, until someone wins. Fast Play also offers single top prize games such as BINGO and CASHWORD.

== Former draw games ==
=== Lucky Links ===
Lucky Links began April 26, 2015. Played similar to tic-tac-toe, each $2 ticket contained eight numbers, with a "$" free space in the middle. The player needed to make at least two complete horizontal, vertical, or diagonal lines to win a cash prize. If the player completed the board(matching all eight printed numbers), they won $50,000. A doubler option, for an extra $1(called "2X Power"), doubled a prize for matching three to six lines. Prizes were $5(2 lines), $10(3 lines), $50(4 lines), $100(5 lines), $1000(6 lines), and $50,000(7 & all 8 lines). The chance of winning a prize was 1 in 8.4; the chance of winning the top prize was 1 in 319,770. Drawings were held daily at 1:45 PM and 10:15 PM EST. Only the Monday through Friday drawings were televised. All game tickets were Quick Picks. Sales for the game ended on June 30, 2020.

=== 5 Card Cash ===
On May 4, 2014, the Connecticut Lottery began sales of 5 Card Cash. This game, the first of its kind in Connecticut, combined an "instant" game with a more traditional(albeit with "playing cards" instead of numbers) drawing-style game. The first drawing was held on May 5, 2014, in keeping with the "five" theme. Sales for the game were suspended on November 14, 2015.

Each play cost $2. There were no play slips, multi-game tickets, or advance play. A ticket(quick-pick only) won instantly if it matched a poker hand(straight, flush, or "jacks-or-better)." Prizes in the "instant" game ranged from $3 to $5,555. Additionally, while a "lower" pair did not win immediately, a pair of 5s won a 5 Card Cash ticket. The draw-game portion required a player to match at least three of the five cards drawn. Matching three cards won $20; four cards, $555. Matching all five cards won or shared $255,555.

== Multi-jurisdictional draw games ==
=== Lucky For Life ===
In 2009, Connecticut began a $2-per-play game called Lucky4Life. Three years later, the game became Lucky For Life(drawing five numbers from the first chamber, and one lucky ball from the second chamber of the machine), expanding to include Maine, Massachusetts, New Hampshire, Rhode Island, and Vermont; its "nickname" became New England′s Game.

Lucky for Life changed its double matrix on September 17, 2013. Players chose 5 of 43 "white ball" numbers, and a green "Lucky Ball" from a second set of 43. For the first time; a "lifetime" winner could choose the annuity or cash. This format change added a second "lifetime" tier.

Lucky for Life became a "quasi-national" game on January 27, 2015, adding eight lotteries on that date. As of April 2, 2017, the game is offered in 22 states and the District of Columbia. Players choose 5 of 48 "white balls", and a sixth number, from 18 green "Lucky Balls." Top prize is $1,000-per-day-for-life(with a $5,750,000 cash option); second prize is $25,000 per year-for-life, with a $390,000 cash option.(A similar game, Cash4Life, began in June 2014; it is currently available in nine states).

=== Mega Millions ===
Connecticut began selling Mega Millions tickets January 31, 2010, following a 2009 agreement in which lotteries then offering either Mega Millions or Powerball were allowed to offer both games. Connecticut is among 46 lotteries selling Mega Millions tickets. Mega Millions plays are $2 each, or $3 with the Megaplier option. The current format for Mega Millions began on October 28, 2017.

Mega Millions players choose 5 of 70 white ball numbers and a "Mega Ball" numbered 01 through 25. Jackpots began at $40,000,000 with minimum rollovers of $5,000,000. Jackpot winners chose either 30 graduated annual payments(increasing 5% per annum) or the cash value option. Other prizes range from $2 to $1,000,000.

The Megaplier option, which increases the cost of each $2 play to $3, multiplies non-jackpot winnings by 2, 3, 4, or 5; a second-prize(all five white balls but not also the "Mega Ball") wager can win $5,000,000 cash.

As of March 26, 2018, Connecticut has yet to produce a Mega Millions jackpot winner.

The "Just the Jackpot" option for Mega Millions, which began with the October 2017 format change(all six numbers must be matched to win), is not available in Connecticut.)

=== Powerball ===
Connecticut has been a member of the Multi-State Lottery Association(MUSL) since 1995. MUSL operates Powerball, which is offered by 44 lotteries. A jackpot of $254.2 million was won in the November 2, 2011, drawing by one ticket, sold in Fairfield County. Three men claimed the ticket; it is the largest prize in Connecticut Lottery history.

On January 15, 2012, Powerball became a $2-per-play game; $3 with Power Play.

== Replay feature ==
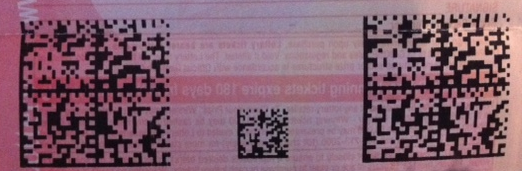
The two large data matrix barcodes on this ticket are used to activate the Replay feature on Connecticut Lottery terminals.

The Connecticut Lottery, in April 2011, began its "Replay" option; players can use old tickets, in lieu of betting cards, to repeat number selections played in the appropriate games. The replay feature makes use of either of the two large data matrix barcodes found on Connecticut Lottery tickets. They contain information such as

== Scratch games ==
The Connecticut Lottery offers numerous scratch games with price points of $1, $2, $3, $5, $10, $20, $30, and $50 with differing themes and prize levels.

Beginning with the April 8, 2013 launch of its 19th version of Win for Life, all prizes in Connecticut Lottery scratch games are paid in lump sum (some games' top prizes are annuitized with a cash option. None of the winners of previous versions of Connecticut "lifetime" scratch games could receive their prize in cash.)

== 1998 shooting ==
On March 6, 1998, there was a mass shooting at Connecticut Lottery headquarters, which was then located in Newington. An employee, 35-year-old Matthew Beck, armed with a 9mm Glock pistol and a knife, shot and killed four of his supervisors, and then killed himself with a shot to the right temple as police arrived. He was upset about not getting a promotion despite working there for 9 years, having to do tasks that were not his job description, and other such grievances against his bosses.

== See also ==
- Gambling in Connecticut
- Lotteries in the United States
