= Florida Lottery =

Lottery of the U.S. state of Florida

Agency overview
- Formed: January 12, 1988; 38 years ago
- Jurisdiction: Florida
- Headquarters: Tallahassee, Florida
- Motto: Doing Good For Education. It’s Good Fun.
- Agency executive: John F. Davis, Secretary
- Website: www.flalottery.com

The Florida Lottery is the government-operated lottery of the U.S. state of Florida. As of 2022, the lottery offers eleven terminal-generated games: Cash4Life, Mega Millions, Powerball, Florida Lotto, Pick 2, Pick 3, Pick 4, Pick 5, Fantasy 5, Cash Pop, and Jackpot Triple Play. Participants must be 18 or older to play.

The lottery was established through efforts by Governor Bob Martinez and the Florida legislature to generate revenue for public education in Florida. The lottery's first game, the $1 scratch-off Millionaire, was launched in 1988.

In 2012, Florida was the third-ranked state in yearly lottery revenue with $4.45 billion; revenue passed $5 billion in fiscal year 2013.

== History ==
The Florida Lottery began operation on January 12, 1988, by order of a constitutional amendment approved by Florida voters in the general election of November 4, 1986. The lottery was established to generate additional funding for public education in Florida, with a significant portion of revenue directed to the Education Enhancement Trust Fund. The Bright Futures scholarship program is funded by the Florida Lottery. The minimum age to purchase a Florida Lottery ticket, regardless of game, is 18.

The Lottery’s first game was Millionaire, a $1 scratch-off ticket with a top prize of $1 million. Since its inception, the Florida Lottery has introduced a variety of games, including daily and multi-state games. Notable additions include the Play 4 game in 1991, the addition of a cash option to Florida Lotto in 1998, and the launch of Mega Millions tickets in 2013

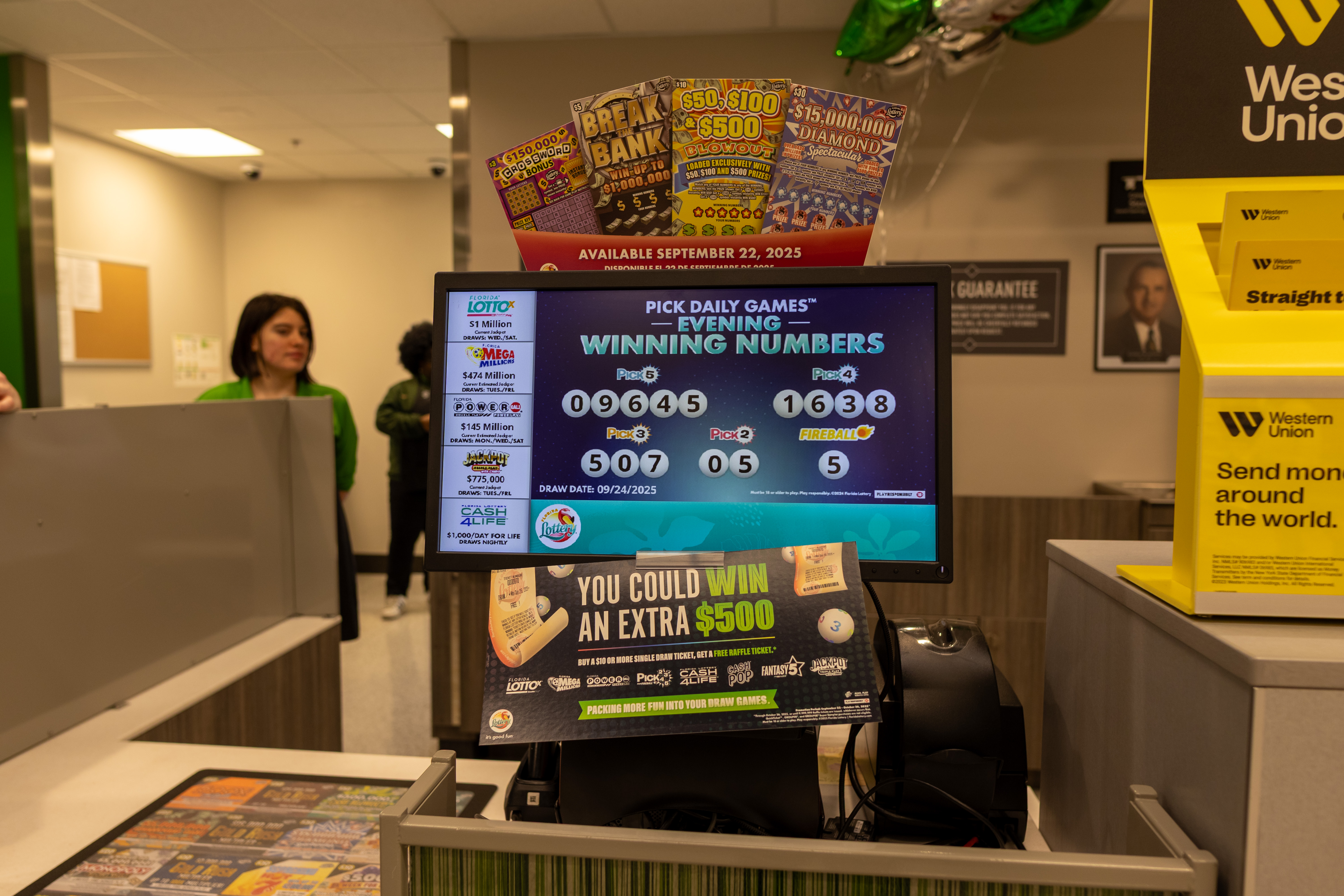
A Florida Lottery booth at a Publix store in Orlando, Florida.

On July 2, 2008, the Florida Lottery announced it would be joining Powerball, making it the 32nd lottery to join the Multi-State Lottery Association (MUSL), which includes the District of Columbia and the U.S. Virgin Islands. The Powerball game changed to accommodate Florida, which then became the most populous MUSL member. Powerball sales began in Florida on January 4, 2009; the first drawing was held at Universal Orlando Resort three days later for the January 7 drawing. Florida became the home base of the Powerball drawing.

On January 12, 2013, the Florida Lottery celebrated 25 years in operation with a major rebranding campaign including a logo redesign and presence on social media, including Facebook and Twitter.

On February 28, 2013, the Florida Lottery announced it would begin selling Mega Millions tickets on May 15, 2013. Florida became the 43rd state to join Mega Millions.

== Bright Futures Scholarship Program ==
The Bright Futures Scholarship Program was created in 1997 with revenues generated from the Florida Lottery, and was meant to emulate the Hope Scholarship in Georgia. Originally the program disbursed more than 42,000 scholarships totaling about $70 million. Later, the costs for the scholarship ballooned substantially. The Scholarship currently costs the Lottery's coffers more than $436.1 million, with about 170,000 students taking advantage of the program.

== Instant games ==
Florida Lottery instant games range in price from $1 to $50, with higher priced tickets typically putting out a higher percentage of sales back into prizes. Payouts range from 58% to almost 77% of sales and average 70%.

== Draw games ==
Webcasts of the Lottery's draw games are available on the Florida Lottery web site. According to the Florida Lottery, $1.28 billion in proceeds went to Florida schools, about 5% of the education budget in 2008–2009. See Your Winning Numbers .

=== Florida-only draw games ===
==== Pick 2 ====
Pick 2, which debuted in Florida on August 1, 2016, is drawn every day during a live broadcast at 1:30 p.m. Eastern Time for the midday drawing, and, effective August 5, 2018, 9:45 p.m. (previously 7:57 p.m.) ET for the evening drawing. It uses a two chambered ball machine, each with balls numbered ranging from 0 through 9. One ball is drawn from each chamber. Anyone who matches the two digits (in any order, or only in order, depending on how the numbers were played; Picks 2, 3, 4, and 5 offer several different options when playing) in exact order wins $50 on a $1 ticket.

==== Pick 3 ====
Pick 3 (formerly named Cash 3 until August 1, 2016) is drawn every day during a live broadcast immediately following the Pick 2 drawings. It is played the same way as Pick 2, except a three chambered ball machine is used. Anyone who matches the three digits (in any order, or only in order, depending on how exactly the numbers are played; Picks 2, 3, 4, and 5 offer several different options when playing) in exact order wins $500 on a $1 wager. More recently, more ways to play involving multiple-number tickets were introduced. On August 23, 2010, Florida added a 1-OFF selection to the game. This gives the player 26 extra combinations of his/her number in which the digits are 1 up or 1 down. If the number matched exactly, one would win just $250 instead of $500 for a $1 play and $125 instead of $250 for a 50-cent play. If one of the 1-Off numbers drew, one would win $10 on $1 plays and $5 on 50-cent plays. See the lottery website for further details.

==== Pick 4 ====
Pick 4 (formerly named Play 4 until August 1, 2016) is drawn every day during a live broadcast immediately following the Pick 3 drawings. This time, a four chambered ball machine is used, and anyone who matches the four digits (in any order, or only in order, depending on how exactly the numbers are played; Picks 2, 3, 4, and 5 offer several different options when playing) in exact order wins $5,000 on a $1 wager.

==== Pick 5 ====
Pick 5, which debuted in Florida on August 1, 2016, is drawn every day during a live broadcast immediately following the Pick 4 drawings. This time, a five chambered ball machine is used, and anyone who matches the five digits (in any order, or only in order, depending on how exactly the numbers are played; Picks 2, 3, 4, and 5 offer several different options when playing) in exact order wins $50,000 on a $1 wager.

===== Fireball =====
The Fireball is an add-on to the Pick 2, Pick 3, Pick 4, and Pick 5 games introduced on January 18, 2021. Activating the Fireball doubles the cost of the play.

After the Pick games are drawn, one digit from 0 through 9 is drawn and designated as the Fireball number. The Fireball number may then be used by the player to replace any one digit in any of the Pick games. For instance, if the player selects 1-2-3 in the Pick 3 game, and the number actually drawn is 1-2-4, but the Fireball is a 3, the player may replace the 4 with a 3 to create a winning combination.

Because the Fireball creates additional ways to win, a win using the Fireball generally pays a lesser amount than a win using the base play (with the exceptions of the front and back digit plays in Pick 2), however, a player can win both from the Fireball and from the base play if the Fireball matches one of the digits naturally.

==== Fantasy 5 ====
Fantasy 5 is drawn twice every day during a live broadcast at 11:15 p.m. and, since March 20, 2023, 1:05 p.m. ET. (Before that date, it was drawn every night.) A single ball machine is used with balls numbered from 1 through 36. (Before July 16, 2001, the matrix was 1 through 26, and before 1993, it was 1 through 39.) Five balls are drawn from the machine. Anyone who matches all five numbers in any order wins or shares a top prize pool of around $100,000. Originally, if no one matched all five, the pool rolled down to the 4-out-of-5 winners.

The rolldown feature in Fantasy 5 was modified on September 15, 2008. See the Rollover and Rolldown section below for more details. An astonishing 98 people won the August 28, 2012, Fantasy 5 drawing (the combination was 1, 3, 5, 7, 9), reminiscent of a scene in the movie, Bruce Almighty. The reward for each winning ticket was only $1,992.32.

==== Jackpot Triple Play ====
Jackpot Triple Play is drawn each Tuesday and Friday during a live broadcast at 11:15 p.m. ET. Jackpot Triple Play replaced Lucky Money. A single ball machine is used with numbered balls ranging from 1 through 46. For $1 players select 6 numbers, or may opt to have them quick picked. Two additional rows of 6 numbers are automatically quick picked. Each of the 3 rows play separately for regular prizes. For an additional $1, players add a "Combo" option for that selection, then the numbers of all 3 lines qualify for matching the drawn numbers, even if they appear more than once. The game has a progressive jackpot that starts at $250,000 and can roll up to $2 million. Once the jackpot reaches $2 million and there is no jackpot winner, the excess money for the jackpot prize will be added to the other prizes that the game offers being paid to the players matching fewer numbers on a single row or any numbers on multiple rows upon the drawing and it’ll be that way until someone wins the jackpot prize.

$2 purchase			$3 combo purchase		
Numbers matched	Probability	Payout	Numbers matched	Probability	Payout
6 of 6 (one line)	1:3,122,273.33	Jackpot	10+ of 18 (all lines)	1:323,322.60	$10,000.00
5 of 6 (one line)	1:13,009.80	$500.00	9 of 18 (all lines)	1:26,569.71	$500.00
4 of 6 (one line)	1:267.19	$25.00	8 of 18 (all lines)	1:2,815.95	$50.00
3 of 6 (one line)	1:16.14	$1.00	7 of 18 (all lines)	1:405.13	$20.00
			6 of 18 (all lines)	1:79.17	$10.00
			5 of 18 (all lines)	1:21.18	$5.00
			4 of 18 (all lines)	1:7.88	Free Ticket

==== Cash Pop ====
Cash Pop was introduced to the lottery beginning January 3, 2022, and is drawn five times every day (8:45 a.m. ET for the morning drawing, 11:45 a.m. ET for the matinee drawing, 2:45 p.m. ET for the afternoon drawing, 6:45 p.m. ET for the evening drawing, and 11:45 p.m. ET for the late night drawing). One number from 1 to 15 is selected for a chance to win up to $2,500 in cash prizes. Players can select a single number or up to 15 numbers in each play panel, quick pick to obtain a single random number, or can play all 15 numbers for a guaranteed prize using the "Play All" option. Players can then select the amount of $1, $2, $5, or $10 to play per number, which determines the cash prize they could win, as well as how many consecutive draws they want to play: 1, 2, 3, 4, 5, or 10.

==== Florida Lotto ====
Florida Lotto is drawn each Wednesday and Saturday during a live broadcast at 11:15 p.m. ET. A single ball machine is used with numbered balls ranging from 1 through 53 (before October 24, 1999, there were 49 balls). Anyone who matches all six numbers in any order wins or shares the jackpot.

In October 2009, the Lotto Xtra option was introduced, replacing Lotto Plus. Players can pay an additional $1 for each game, multiplying non-jackpot winnings by 2x, 3x, 4x, or 5x. Additionally, Lotto Xtra tickets win a free play for matching 2 of 6 numbers.

Beginning on October 10, 2020, the Lotto Double Play option was introduced for an additional $1 per play, which allows players the chance to win up to $250,000 in an additional drawing following the regular Lotto drawing. Also, the Xtra feature is switched into an instant multiplier for every purchased ticket, which automatically multiplies the non-jackpot prizes by 2, 3, 4, 5, or up to 10 times, and also works on the Double Play additional drawing feature. This means that, similar to any other numbers game that has a multiplier feature, players can’t win the base game or double play prizes for matching 3, 4, or 5 numbers in any order as those prizes are shown as starting prizes for cumulative prize amounts which give players a chance to win upwards of $35,000 without winning the jackpot prize or the double play top prize. The prize for matching 2 numbers in any order (for both the base game and double play drawings) is a free “Florida Lotto” ticket that’s eligible for the next “Florida Lotto” drawing.

=== Multi-jurisdictional games ===
==== Mega Millions ====
Mega Millions is offered in 45 states, the District of Columbia, and the U.S. Virgin Islands. Mega Millions was added to the Florida Lottery on May 15, 2013. The game began its current format on October 19, 2013; since October 28, 2017, players choose 5 of 70 "white balls", and a gold-colored "Mega Ball" from a second pool, of 25 numbers. The odds of winning the jackpot per play are 1 in 302,575,350. Games are $2 each ($1 previously); games with the "Megaplier" option are $3 ($2 previously). Also, the Mega Millions starting jackpot increased to $40 million from $15 million. (On April 2, 2020, because of the COVID-19 novel coronavirus pandemic, the Mega Millions starting jackpot amount was temporarily reduced to $20 million.) The Megaplier multiplies non-jackpot prizes by up to 5.

Mega Millions is drawn Tuesday and Friday nights at 11:00 p.m. Eastern Time at the WSB-TV main studios in Atlanta, Georgia.

==== Powerball ====
Powerball became available in Florida on January 4, 2009; the first drawing including Florida was January 7. Powerball jackpots start at $40 million; Since August 23, 2021, Powerball is drawn Monday, Wednesday, and Saturday nights at 10:59 p.m. (On April 7, 2020, due to the COVID-19 pandemic, the Powerball starting jackpot amount was temporarily reduced to $20 million.) Since October 7, 2015, players choose 5 of 69 "white balls", and a red-colored "Powerball" out of 26 numbers from a separate pool. The odds of winning the jackpot per play are 1 in 292,201,338. Each draw costs $2, or $3 with the Power Play option (Previously, Powerball plays cost $1; when PowerPlay began, such games were $2.). The official cutoff for ticket sales is 10:00 p.m. Eastern Time, with some lotteries cutting off their sales earlier.

As a result of Florida joining Powerball, the regular drawing venue was moved from Iowa to Universal Orlando Resort, and then to the Lottery's Tallahassee headquarters.

== Former games ==
=== Cash4Life ===
The Florida Lottery joined Cash4Life on February 17, 2017. (The game also is available in Georgia, Indiana, Maryland, Missouri, New Jersey, New York, Pennsylvania, Tennessee, and Virginia.)

Players choose 5 of 60 numbers in one field, and 1 of 4 green "Cash Ball" numbers in the second field. Until July 1, 2019, live drawings were held on Monday and Thursday evenings at 9:00 p.m. Eastern Time on Livestream. Since then, the drawings are held nightly at 9:00 p.m. ET. The top prize (win or share) is $1,000-per-day-for-life. Second prize is $1,000-per-week-for-life. A cash option is available for winners of a "lifetime" prize. After this and Lucky For Life's consolidation into Millionaire For Life, the Florida Lottery elected not to join Millionaire for Life at this time. Cash4Life was discontinued on February 21, 2026.

=== Monopoly Millionaires' Club ===
Monopoly Millionaires' Club (MMC) began sales on October 19, 2014, with 23 lotteries participating in the launch. MMC, drawn weekly on Fridays, was suspended following the December 26 draw.

MMC was tied to a television game show, which continued airing until April 2016; the draw game was replaced by 16 states' versions of an MMC scratch ticket. The game show featured players and audience members who won a trip to Las Vegas via the draw game, and later the scratch game.

=== Lucky Lines (Instant game) ===
Lucky Lines tickets went on sale on October 11, 2010. Players who wish to purchase this game must make two selections when they buy their tickets. First they must choose how much to pay for each ticket, either $1, $2, $3, or $5 and secondly they must determine if they wish to select a set of 7 numbers between 1 and 49 or let the computer select (Quick Pick) the numbers for them. Like previous online games players may mark their selections on a Lucky Lines play slip or verbally give their instructions to the Lottery Terminal operator. Unlike other Lottery online games players may not have a partial quick pick ticket. Players must either select all 7 numbers, or have the computer quick pick all numbers.

As each ticket is produced the Lottery's computer generates a 7x7 grid with the numbers 1 through 49 arranged in each cell. If the player selected their own numbers the grid will be completely randomized. If the player numbers were quick picked the numbers on the 7x7 grid will be in sequential order to make it easier for players to find their numbers on the grid. Regardless to the method of play, the game odds and dynamic are unchanged. Players are then asked to circle their 7 numbers on the grid and if 3 or more of the numbers for a straight line horizontally, vertically, or diagonally that ticket is a winner. In addition a ticket with no numbers touching is also a winner and will pay double the original ticket cost. Since the grid has all 49 numbers present it is not possible for any player numbers to not be in the grid; all tickets will have all 7 player numbers on the grid. Prizes are awarded for tickets with a single 3 number line, a single 4 number line, two independent 3 number lines, a 5 number line, separate 3 and 4 number lines, 6 numbers in a line, or all 7 numbers in a single line. If all 7 numbers form a line the ticket is a grand prize winner and will pay $400,000 for a $1 bet, $1 million for a $2 bet, $1.6 million for a $3 bet, and $3 million for a $5 bet. All lucky lines prizes are lump sum awards. The odds of winning the top prize is 1:5,368,787. The odds of winning any prize is 1:4.37.

Unlike previous online games, Lucky Lines players do not have to wait till a future drawing to determine if their ticket is a winner making this game very similar to one of the Lottery's scratch off offerings. However, unlike scratch-off tickets where the winning tickets are all predetermined and top prizes may be sold before a player makes their purchase, the Lottery's computer randomly generates all Lucky Line tickets in real time. All Lucky Lines tickets have an equal chance of winning the top prize regardless of what tickets were sold in the past. Because Lucky Lines is an instant win game, tickets cannot be cancelled once purchased.

With the introduction of Mega Millions, Lucky Lines ended in 2013.

=== Lucky Money ===
Lucky Money (originally known as Mega Money until July 1, 2014 in an effort to avoid confusion with Mega Millions) was drawn each Tuesday and Friday during a live broadcast at 11:15 p.m. ET. One ball machine with two chambers was used, the first chamber with white balls numbered from 1 through 47, and the second chamber with orange balls (called the "Lucky Ball") numbered from 1 through 17. (Before July 1, 2014, the first chamber had 44 white balls, and the second chamber had 22 balls (called the "Mega Ball") that were originally colored pink. And before January 28, 2004, each chamber contained 32 balls.) Four balls were drawn from the "white" chamber, and one Lucky Ball number was drawn from the "orange" chamber. Anyone who matched all four white numbers in any order plus the Lucky Ball won or shared the jackpot. The jackpot began at $500,000 (annuity). If not won, the jackpot increased until it reached $2 million, where it was capped. Any excess funds rolled down to the lower prize levels. Unlike the original version of Lucky Money, which was all-cash, jackpot winners desiring the lump sum had to claim their prize within 60 days of the drawing. From July 1, 2014, Lucky Money also had the add on feature of EZmatch for a dollar extra per play. Lucky Money had its final drawing on January 29, 2019, and was replaced with Jackpot Triple Play.

== Other Florida Lottery Information ==
Though the Florida Lottery's expenses and payouts vary from year to year, approximately 50 percent of its net revenue makes up the games' prize pools, 40 percent is transferred to the Educational Enhancement Trust Fund, 6 percent is paid to retailers in the form of commissions, 2 percent is paid to the Lottery's on-line and Scratch-Off ticket vendors, and the remaining 2 percent covers operational costs, including advertising.

All Pick 2, Pick 3, Pick 4, Pick 5, and Fantasy 5 winners receive their winnings as a one-time, lump-sum payment. Any winnings of less than $600 may be redeemed at an authorized Florida Lottery retailer; higher winnings must be redeemed at a Lottery district office or at Lottery headquarters in Tallahassee. All non-Powerball prizes greater than $250,000, or Powerball prizes more than $1 million, must be redeemed at Florida Lottery headquarters. Lucky Money jackpot winners may choose between an annuity of 20 payments that equals the advertised jackpot, or a lump-sum payment, which is about 2/3 of the advertised jackpot, less federal income tax withholding. Florida Lotto jackpot winners may choose between an annuity of 30 payments, or a lump-sum payment, which is about 1/2 of the advertised jackpot less federal income taxes. For both Lucky Money and Florida Lotto, the cash option, if desired, must be exercised within 60 days of the applicable drawing. Florida does not collect income tax; however, like all U.S. lottery prizes, they are taxable by the federal government.

As of January 2013, the Florida Lottery had 13,200 retail stores selling products. Each retailer earns 5% of their ticket sales and 1% on cashed tickets. They also receive incentives for a top winning ticket sold in the big games. A $100,000 bonus is given to the store for a winning Powerball ticket. Publix is the largest retailer in the state, accounting for 18% of all lottery sales.

Winners of Florida Lottery on-line games (Florida Lotto, Lucky Money, Fantasy 5, and Picks 2-3-4-5) must claim their prize within 180 days of the applicable drawing. Fifty percent of ticket sales go to prize payouts. Eighty percent of unclaimed jackpot money is transferred to the Educational Enhancement Trust Fund, while 20 percent of the jackpot is transferred to a prize pool for funding future prizes.

Florida resident Richard Lustig won seven lotto prizes between 1993 and 2010, totaling over $1 million before taxes. He wrote a best-selling booklet promoting the techniques he believes led to his lotto success, though critics characterized Lustig as promoting a get-rich-quick scheme and questioned his net wealth levels by noting that he used much of his lotto winnings to buy additional lotto tickets.

=== Florida Bright Futures ===
In addition to simple donations to education, the Florida Lottery has, along with the Florida Legislature established the Bright Futures Scholarship Program to help students pay for college. Since the program's inception in 1997, the Florida Lottery has contributed more than $3.9 billion to send over 600,000 students to college. The Florida Bright Futures Scholarship Program consists of three levels of awards. The first is the Florida Gold Seal Vocational Scholars Award, followed by the Florida Medallion Scholars Award, and finally the Florida Academic Scholars Award. Once the student is in college, these awards must be renewed by maintaining a minimum 2.75 GPA for Florida Gold Seal Vocational and Florida Medallion Scholars awards and a 3.0 for the Florida Academic Scholars Award. Each award has additional hours requirements to maintain.

== Rollover, Rolldown, and "Quick Pick" ==
Rollover: A rollover occurs when a jackpot is not won; it is carried over to that game's next drawing. Powerball, Lotto, Lucky Money, and Mega Millions all use rollovers to increase their jackpots when no one wins a drawing. Lucky Money has a $2 million jackpot cap, after which any money in excess must roll down. Florida Lotto does not have a jackpot cap and can roll over as long as no one matches all six numbers. Powerball had a rollover cap but as of the 2012 game modification and conversion to a $2 price point game, no longer has a cap.

Rolldown: A rolldown occurs when a top prize pool is not won, and that money is redistributed to be shared with those that win a smaller prize. In Lucky Money, when a $2 million jackpot is not won, any funds in excess of $2 million are rolled down and added to the pools for all other winners, except players who only matched the "Numbers" (they still get a free ticket). In Fantasy 5, whenever no player matches all five numbers, the top prize pool is added to the second prize pool (correctly matching four numbers). On September 15, 2008, the Fantasy 5 rolldown was modified; the top prize pool now is added to second prize. However, matching four numbers is capped at $555 per occurrence; in such cases, the third prize (three numbers matched) pool receives the remainder of rolldown funds.

Quick-Pick: Players can fill out a bubble sheet with the numbers for the game they want to play. Another option is called Quick-Pick, which allows the lottery terminal to select numbers for the chosen game. In either case, players can opt for 52 consecutive draws (Advance Play) for Florida Lotto, 30 consecutive draws for Lucky Money or Fantasy 5, and 14 consecutive draws for Picks 2, 3, 4 or 5. When the Florida Lottery's number games were established, however, quick-picks were not available, nor were Advance Play tickets—all purchasers had to select their own numbers for the next drawing only.

== The Florida Council on Compulsive Gambling ==
The Florida Council on Compulsive Gambling (FCCG) is an 501(c)(3) non-profit organization created to provide information, support, and referrals to anyone affected by problem gambling. It began the same year that the Florida Lottery was implemented. The agency operates the 24/7, confidential, and multilingual problem gambling helpline, 888-ADMIT-IT, which provides resource referrals for gamblers and loved ones suffering from gambling disorder. The FCCG also has programs for awareness/prevention of compulsive gambling. Training is available for professionals who have interaction with gambling-addicted individuals.

== Criticism ==
Florida voters approved the lottery in 1986 to fund education enhancement. The law stipulated that 50% go to prizes, 38% go to education, and the remaining 12% used for lottery administration and promotion. Within a few years, the legislature began to subvert the original intent. In the state budget, they began to use lottery money to pay for education operating costs and salaries while shifting those tax dollars to pet projects and non-educational spending.

By 1994, voters were angry with the politicians in Tallahassee. Frank Brogan was elected Florida Commissioner of Education with Lottery funding being a key issue. Brogan's plan created the Bright Futures Scholarship Program, funded voluntary Pre-K programs for disadvantaged children, and provided enhancements for public schools, including educational technology and new classrooms. Brogan commented, "Floridians have come to see lottery funding of education as a giant shell game. This is important both to enhance education and to restore credibility to the lottery and government in general."

In 1995, State Senators Ken Jenne and Karen Johnson stated that the lottery wasn't funding education the way it should and filed bills to change that. Senator Jenne displayed an alternate Lottery logo to indicate that Lottery funding was in bad shape. For that year, Lottery money comprised 7.5% ($829 million) of the state's $11 billion education budget.

== See also ==
- Bright Futures Scholarship Program
- MUSL
- Powerball
- Mega Millions
- Lotteries in the United States
