= Cash4Life =

American lottery drawing game

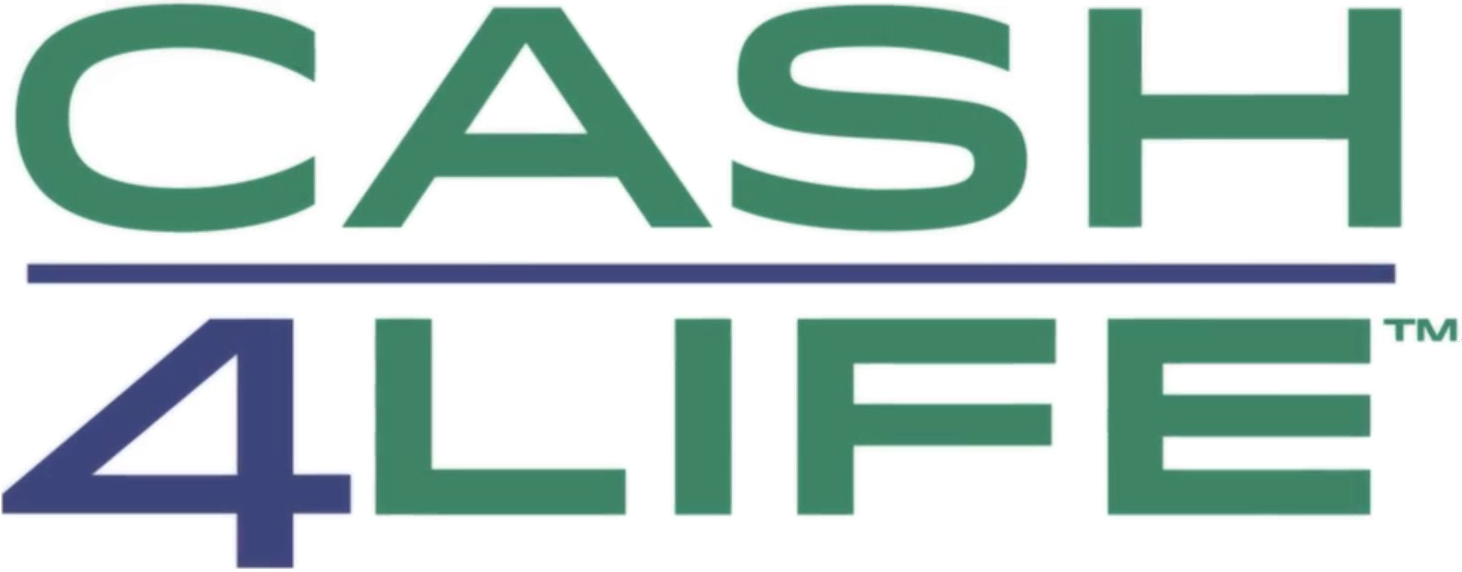
Cash4Life logo

Cash4Life was an American multi-jurisdictional lottery drawing game; it was offered by ten state lotteries and was drawn nightly. Ticket sales began on June 13, 2014, in New York and New Jersey; the first drawing took place three days later.

The game along with its rival Lucky For Life was retired and held its final drawing on February 21, 2026. Both games were replaced by a single joint lifetime-prize game, Millionaire for Life, a fixed-jackpot draw game offering a $1 million annuity payout (paid out at a guaranteed minimum over 20 years), launched on February 22, 2026. Florida, Maryland and Missouri were the only Cash4Life jurisdictions (among four overall between the predecessor games) that elected not to transition over to Millionaire for Life upon launch.

== Rules ==
Each game cost $2 per drawing. Players pick five white ball numbers from 1 through 60 in the main field, plus one number from 1 through 4 from the second field, the green "Cash Ball". Players also have the option to have the terminal randomly select the numbers in both fields. Matching all five numbers in the main field plus the Cash Ball wins, or shares ("split-prize liability"), the equivalent of $1,000-per-day-for-life, or $7,000,000 cash, at the winner's option. Second prize, however, can have multiple winners of $1,000-per-week-for-life and/or $1,000,000 cash. New Jersey Lottery regulations require that players choose either the annuity or cash option when playing. First- and second-prize winners who chose the annuity option can change to the cash option after winning; however, the cash option is binding and cannot be changed.

=== New Jersey's Doubler NJ option ===
On May 15, 2017, New Jersey added an option, called Doubler NJ; it can be added to a Cash4Life ticket for an additional $1 per play. Any non-"for Life" prize is doubled. New Jersey was the only state to offer the Doubler NJ option for Cash4Life.

== Odds and prizes ==
Matches		Prize		Approximate odds of winning (per $2 play)
White Balls (60)	Cash Ball (4)	Base Prize	Doubler NJ	Approximate odds of winning (per $2 play)
5	1	$1,000 a Day for Life ($7,000,000 cash)†‡		1: 21,846,048
5	0	$1,000 a Week for Life ($1,000,000 cash)†		1: 7,282,016
4	1	$2,500†	$5,000†	1: 79,440
4	0	$500	$1,000†	1: 26,480
3	1	$100	$200	1: 1,471
3	0	$25	$50	1: 490
2	1	$10	$20	1: 83
2	0	$4	$8	1: 28
1	1	$2	$4	1: 13

The overall odds of winning were approximately 1:7.76. The prize pool was 55 percent of sales.

† The top two annuitized prizes, third prize, and the $1,000 Doubler NJ prize each had a liability limit. If there were multiple winners of the top prize, the prize is divided between the winners. If there were more than 14 top prize winners in the same drawing then the prize will automatically be paid in cash to each winner. If there are more than five second prize winners in the same draw the prize would be awarded in cash and be divided evenly among the winners for that draw. If there were more than the number of winners established in the rules of the game for the third prize and the fourth prize with the “DOUBLER NJ” feature the prize for that category would be distributed based on the amount established in the game’s rules. Cash option values (which can change periodically), were $7,000,000 for the top prize, and $1,000,000 for second prize.

‡ The top prize is "split-prize liability"; in essence, a non-progressive jackpot.

Winners of either "lifetime" prize tier could receive cash in lieu of the lifetime annuity. Rules varied by Cash4Life members: a ticket bought in Florida whose winner prefers the cash option must claim within 60 days of the drawing. New Jersey requires the cash/annuity choice be made when purchasing a ticket; a "cash option" choice is legally binding, but an "annuity option" ticket can be changed to the "cash option" when claiming.

== Drawings ==
The nightly Cash4Life drawings were held live from Studio B (a.k.a. the Cash4Life Studio) at New Jersey Lottery Headquarters at Lawrence Park Complex in Trenton, New Jersey, at 9:00 p.m. Eastern Time on Livestream. Each drawing is supervised by an auditor from Hamilton, New Jersey–based Mercadien P.C., a CPA and Asset Management firm. The drawings were originally hosted by Erica Young, through May 10, 2018. Lauren Berman replaced Young in 2018. The drawing's secondary hostess was Jacqueline Knox. Beginning in 2020, the practice of having on-screen hostesses were eliminated in favor of using the off-camera announcers, as a result of the COVID-19 pandemic.

Two drawing machines are used during each Cash4Life drawing. The larger machine (Magnum I) is used for randomly mixing the 60 white balls by using counter-rotating arms. The smaller machine (Messenger Single Digit) mixes the four green Cash Balls by using a clockwise rotating arm. Individually, the five white balls (several seconds apart) followed by the green Cash Ball are drawn; each ball drops through a hole at the bottom of the appropriate mixing drum. The drawing machines are manufactured by Smartplay International of Edgewater Park, New Jersey.

The Cash4Life drawings were originally held on Monday and Thursday evenings before the game expanded to nightly drawings which began on July 1, 2019.

== Participating lotteries ==
Map of U.S. states and territories offering Cash4Life, as of February 2023

Ten states participated in Cash4Life.

Members	Joined	Additional notes
Florida	February 17, 2017	Elected not to join Millionaire For Life at this time.
Georgia	August 29, 2016	Joined Millionaire for Life
Indiana	September 19, 2016	Joined Millionaire for Life
Maryland	January 26, 2016	Elected not to join Millionaire for Life at this time.
Missouri	April 11, 2021	Missouri previously offered Lucky for Life from 2015 to April 8, 2021; it is the only state lottery to offer both "lifetime payout" draw games, although not simultaneously. After the game closure, Missouri chose not to join Millionaire for Life.
New Jersey†	June 13, 2014	Serves as the flagship lottery for Cash4Life. Joined Millionaire for Life.
New York†	June 13, 2014	Replaced Sweet Million. Joined Millionaire for Life.
Pennsylvania	April 7, 2015	Joined Millionaire for Life.
Tennessee	November 1, 2015	Joined Millionaire for Life.
Virginia	May 3, 2015	Replaced Decades of Dollars, a multi-state game which ended as a Virginia-only game. Joined Millionaire for Life.

† Original member

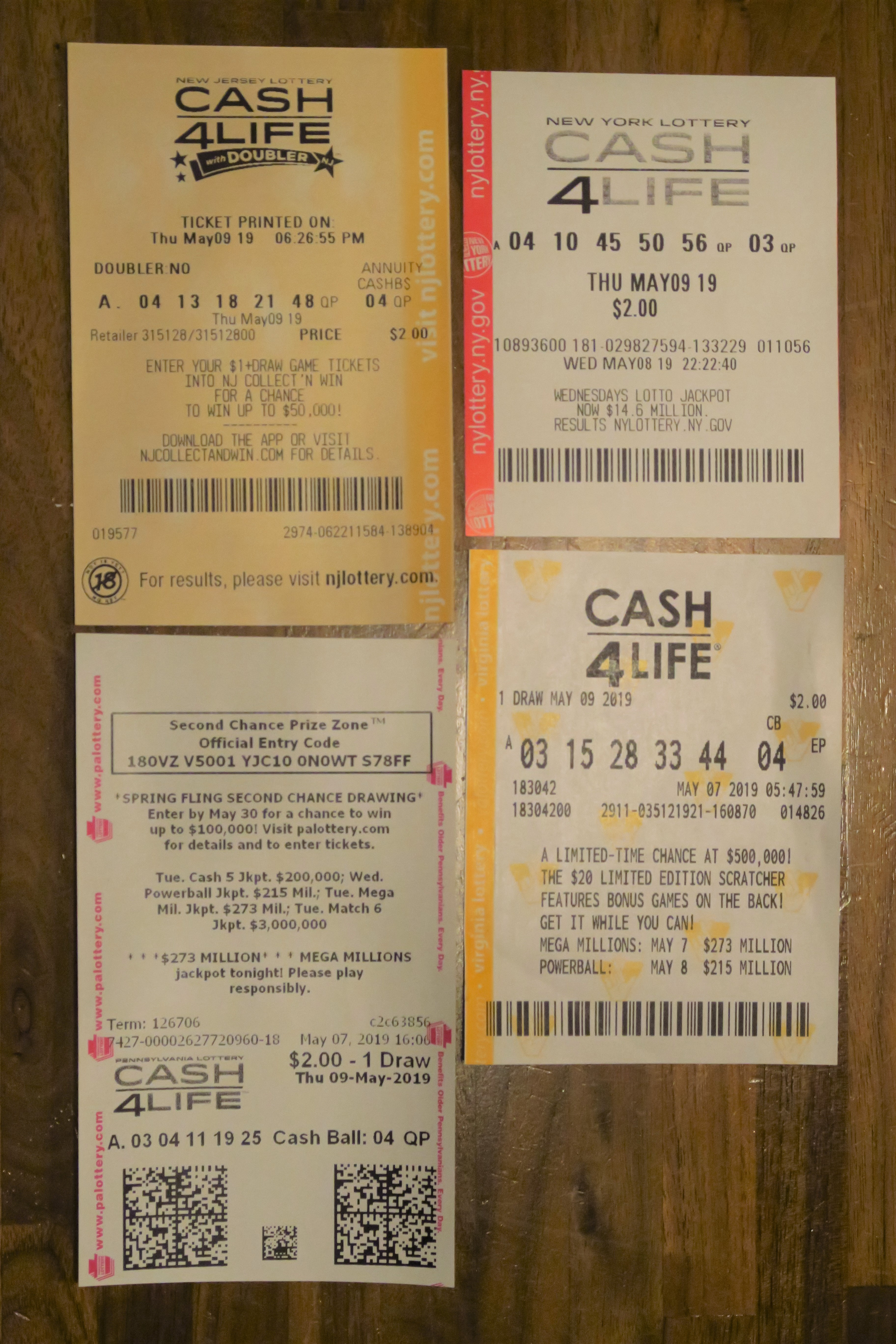
Cash4Life tickets representing four of the game's ten members

== 1998-2000 game ==
Cash 4 Life was also the name of a significantly different game offered from March 30, 1998, to September 7, 2000, by the Multi-State Lottery Association (MUSL). The top prize, $1,000-per-week-for-life (no cash option), was won if the player's primary set of two-digit numbers (00 through 99) matched those drawn. It was offered in Indiana, Iowa, Kansas, Minnesota, Montana, Nebraska, New Hampshire, South Dakota, West Virginia, Wisconsin, and the District of Columbia.

== See also ==
- Lucky for Life, a similar game that began in Connecticut (as Lucky4Life) in 2009; available in 25 states and the District of Columbia as of 2019.
