= D.C. Lottery =

American lottery organization

District of Columbia Office of Lottery and Gaming
- Formation: August 25, 1982
- Type: Lottery System
- Headquarters: Washington, D.C.
- Website: www.dclottery.com

The DC Lottery (official name District of Columbia Office of Lottery and Gaming) is run by the government of the District of Columbia, in the United States. The DC Lottery is a charter member of the Multi-State Lottery Association (MUSL). Games offered include DC 2, DC 3, DC 4, DC 5, Powerball, Mega Millions, Lucky for Life, DC Keno, Race2Riches, The Lucky One, DC Fast Play, DC Tap-N-Play, and DC Scratchers.

Since its inception in August 25, 1982, the DC Lottery has awarded more than $4.4 billion in prizes to members of its community and transferred more than $2.3 billion to the district’s general fund, which supports essential services in the district. DC Lottery's licensing of charitable gaming activities has helped local nonprofits raise more than $136.5 million in support of social causes.

In 2025, D.C. Lottery's operator, Intralot, was fined $6.5 million for having fraudulently obtained and operated its five-year contract.

All D.C. Lottery games have a minimum age of 18.

== Intralot 2019-2025 operator fraud and restituation ==
Attorney General Brian Schwalb announced, on January 14, 2025, that games operator Intralot, and its subcontractor, Veterans Services Corporation (VSC), would pay restitution totaling $6.5 million for its fraudulent operation of a shell game meant to deceive city officials and win the District’s lottery and sports betting contract in 2019; obtain related payments; and appear compliant with District law requiring any firm securing a large public contract to subcontract to small local businesses in order to grow the local economy. VSC was revealed to have no employees. Intralot and VSC were found to have conspired in an "elaborate scheme" to secure the contract, with VSC receiving over half of D.C.’s lottery and sports gambling contract proceeds, and then funneling funds back to Intralot, which will pay $5 million of the $6.5 million settlement.

== Charitable games ==
The board licenses games of chance that are conducted by DC-based non-profit organizations. D.C., Virginia, and Maryland-based charities can offer raffles, with the provision that these drawings are held in the District of Columbia. Organizations seeking to conduct such fundraisers must obtain a license from the board, with D.C. Lottery employees supervising the drawings to assure fairness.

== Games ==
=== Numbers draw games ===
==== DC 3 ====
DC 3 is a three-digit game drawn three times daily.

==== DC 4 ====
DC 4 is a four-digit game drawn three times daily.

==== DC 5 ====
DC 5 is a five-digit game drawn twice daily, with straight and box wagers. It is played in the same manner as Pennsylvania's Pick 5, and Ohio's Pick 5.

=== Monitor draw games ===
==== Race2Riches ====
Race2Riches is a horse betting type game, drawings are every four minutes, from 6 a.m. to 2 a.m. daily. Participants bet which horse will place 1st, 2nd, and 3rd.

DC Keno

Drawings are held every four minutes, from 6:00 a.m. to 2:00 a.m. daily.

The Lucky One

Drawings are held every four minutes, from 6:00 a.m. to 2:00 a.m. daily.

=== Instant-win games ===
DC Fast Play

DC Fast Play is an instant-style game played at any DC Lottery retailer.

DC TAP-N-PLAY

DC TAP-N-PLAY is an instant game played in select DC Lottery retailers.

DC Scratchers

DC Scratchers are scratch-and-win instant games sold at any DC Lottery retailer.

=== Multi-state draw games ===
==== Lucky for Life ====
Lucky for Life began in Connecticut in 2009; it expanded in 2015 to include the District of Columbia, and is now offered by 17 jurisdictions. The lucky for life game has ended with the February 21st, 2026 draw and has been replaced with the multi state millionaire for life game.

==== Mega Millions ====
On January 31, 2010, most U.S. lotteries with either Mega Millions or Powerball began offering both games. The D.C. Lottery added Mega Millions on the cross-selling expansion date. The largest Mega Millions jackpot was over $650 million.

On August 8, 2023, the largest Mega Millions jackpot ever won was $1.602 billion in Florida.

==== Powerball ====
Since 1988, the D.C. Lottery has been a member of MUSL, which created Powerball in 1992. Its jackpots currently start at $20 million. It is drawn Monday, Wednesday, and Saturday nights at the Florida Lottery in Tallahassee, Florida.

==== Millionaire for life ====
Millionaire for life is played in 31 states in the US and Washington DC. Players pick 5from 58 main numbers in the first field and just 1 of 5 millionaire balls and they can win anywhere from $8 to $1,000,000 a year for life. This game was introduced on February 22nd, 2026 as a replacement of Lucky for Life and Cash 4 Life.

On September 19, 2010, the D.C. Lottery had entered the wrong Powerball numbers into its computer system. Terminals read some losing tickets as winners, and vice versa. The lottery revised its procedures to prevent such errors from recurring.

On January 31, 2010, most lotteries with either Mega Millions or Powerball began offering both games. The D.C. Lottery added Mega Millions on that date. The largest jackpot in Mega Millions so far was more than $640 million.

== Sports wagering ==
On May 14, 2018, the Supreme Court of the United States ruled that the Professional and Amateur Sports Protection Act of 1992 which allowed sports wagering only in the State of Nevada to be unconstitutional. This was brought forth in the case of Christie v. the NCAA in which then New Jersey governor Chris Christie (R) wanted to legalize sports wagering in his and other states and territories (Including the District) but professional sports organizations including the National Collegiate Athletic Association (NCAA), Major League Baseball, National Football League and the National Hockey League opposed such operations. Following the ruling, the District of Columbia government, which included Mayor Muriel Bowser (D) and the members of the D.C. City Council, began working on legalizing sports wagering within the district. On September 21, 2021 the D.C. City Council passed, and Mayor Bowser signed into law that legalized sports wagering, the D.C. Lottery was tasked with overseeing the regulation of sports wagering licenses and sportsbook facility.

The D.C. Lottery began operating a wagering app which geo-fences customers to areas within the District of Columbia but access to certain areas of the district would be excluded including, Capitol Hill, residential areas and in and around all the federal buildings, and within 2 blocks of a brick and mortar sportsbook facility. The D.C. Lottery also began operating sports wagering kiosks (GambetDC) at authorized D.C. Lottery agents including at local bodegas, bars, gas stations and restaurants. William Hill owned by Caesars Entertainment was the first sportsbook in the District of Columbia opening its temporary sportsbook in an unused box office area of the Capital One Arena on July 31, 2020 and its permanent sportsbook on May 26, 2021, in the former Greene Turtle Sports Bar and Restaurant on the F and 6th Streets N.W. corner of the Capital One Arena. This was followed by BetMGM opening a sportsbook at Nationals Park, FanDuel sportsbook at Audi Field and a sportsbook which will open at the CareFirst Arena.

As part of the regulations of sports wagering, the District of Columbia prohibits the betting on local college sports including athletics at Georgetown University, George Washington University, American University and Howard University. This is consistent with states like New Jersey which also prohibit wagering on collegiate athletics at big universities like Rutgers, Seton Hall and Princeton.

== DC iLottery ==
The DC Lottery unveiled DC iLottery, a digital sales platform for purchasing lottery games. Players can access DC iLottery from their smart phone, computer, or tablet, and once registered for an account, can play DC3, DC4, DC5, DC Keno, Race2Riches games, and more while physically in the district and not within an area of the district where lottery play is prohibited. The platform uses geolocation technology to confirm a player’s location before a ticket can be purchased.
