= Lotteries in the United States =

In the United States, lotteries are run by 48 jurisdictions: 45 states plus the District of Columbia, Puerto Rico, and the U.S. Virgin Islands.

Lotteries are subject to the laws of and operated independently by each jurisdiction, and there is no national lottery organization. However, consortiums of state lotteries jointly organize games spanning larger geographical footprints, which in turn, carry larger jackpots. Two major lottery games, Mega Millions and Powerball, are both offered in nearly all jurisdictions that operate lotteries, and serve as de facto national lotteries.

In fiscal 2018, Americans spent $77.7 billion on various lotteries, up by about $5 billion from 2017.

== History ==
Historian Neal Millikan using newspaper advertisements in the colonial era found at least 392 lotteries were held in the 13 colonies.

Lotteries were used not only as a form of entertainment but as a source of revenue to help fund the colonies. The financiers of Jamestown, Virginia, for instance, funded lotteries to raise money to support their colony. These lotteries were quite sophisticated for the time period and even included instant winners. Not long after, each of the 13 original colonies established a lottery system to raise revenue.

In the early post-independence era, legislators commonly authorized lotteries to fund schools, roads, bridges, and other public works. Evangelical reformers in the 1830s began denouncing lotteries on moral grounds and petitioned legislatures and constitutional conventions to ban them. Recurring lottery scandals and a general backlash against legislative corruption following the Panic of 1837 also contributed to anti-lottery sentiments. From 1844 to 1859 alone, 10 new state constitutions contained lottery bans. By 1890, lotteries were prohibited in every state except Delaware and Louisiana.

Lotteries in the United States did not always have sterling reputations. One early lottery in particular, the National Lottery, which was passed by Congress for the beautification of Washington, D.C., and was administered by the municipal government, was the subject of a major U.S. Supreme Court decision – Cohens v. Virginia.

The lottery never paid out, and it brought to light the prevalent issue of crookedness amongst the lotteries in the United States. The wave of anti-lottery protests finally broke through when, by 1860, all states had prohibited lotteries except Delaware, Missouri, and Kentucky. The scarcity of lotteries in the United States meant that tickets were shipped across the country and eventually led to the creation of illegal lotteries. In 1868, after years of illegal operation, the Louisiana State Lottery Company obtained a 25-year charter for its state lottery system. The charter was passed by the legislature due to immense bribing from a criminal syndicate in New York. The Louisiana Lottery Company derived 90% of its revenue from tickets sold across state borders. These continued issues of corruption led to the complete prohibition of lotteries in the United States by 1895. It was discovered that the promoters of the Louisiana Lottery Company had accrued immense sums of money from illegitimate sources and that the legislature was riddled with bribery. Before the advent of government-sponsored lotteries, many illegal lotteries thrived, such as number games.

=== Modern era ===
The first modern government-run US lottery was established in Puerto Rico in 1934. This was followed, decades later, by the New Hampshire Lottery in 1964. Instant lottery tickets, also known as scratch cards, were introduced in the 1970s and have become a major source of lottery revenue. Individual lotteries often feature three-digit and four-digit games akin to numbers games; a five number game, and a six number game (the latter two often have a jackpot). Some lotteries also offer at least one game similar to keno, and some offer video lottery terminals. Presently, many US lotteries support public education systems.

As of November 2019, lotteries are established in 45 states, the District of Columbia, Puerto Rico, and the U.S. Virgin Islands; the most recent U.S. state to legalize a lottery is Mississippi, with lottery commission members receiving appointments on October 19, 2018.

The first U.S. multi-state lottery game was formed in 1985 in Maine, New Hampshire, and Vermont; its flagship game remains Tri-State Megabucks. In 1988, the Multi-State Lottery Association (MUSL) was formed with Iowa, Kansas, Missouri, Oregon, Rhode Island, West Virginia, and the District of Columbia as its charter members; it is best known for Powerball, which was designed to create large jackpots. Another joint lottery, The Big Game (now called Mega Millions), was formed in 1996 by six lotteries as its charter members.

As of October 2020, each of the 45 state lotteries offer both Mega Millions and Powerball as a result of a 2009 agreement between the Mega Millions consortium and MUSL to cross-license their game to one another's members, although the two organizations continue to administer Mega Millions and Powerball separately. Mississippi was the most recent to join both, beginning sales in January 2020. Puerto Rico is the only jurisdiction not to offer both, as they do not offer Mega Millions.

=== State revenues ===
State lotteries have become a significant source of revenue for states, raising $17.6 billion in profits for state budgets in the 2009 fiscal year (FY) with 11 states collecting more revenue from their state lottery than from their state corporate income tax during FY2009.

Lottery policies within states can have conflicting goals. Given that instructions are passed down from state legislatures, lottery implementation is often expected to be carried out with reduced advertising and funding while still producing the same amount of revenue. This issue led states to look for loopholes in the system. Massachusetts, for example, had its advertising budget dramatically cut, and therefore started using free-play coupons as money to pay for advertising. This led to an IRS investigation into alleged non-reporting of income because the IRS considered the coupons to have monetary value.

=== States with no lotteries ===
Among the states that do not have lotteries, Alabama cites religious objections and Utah's state constitution bans all forms of gambling. Nevada's gambling industry has lobbied against a state lottery there, fearing the competition; similarly, the Mississippi Gaming Commission expressed concern that a state lottery would constitute a "competing force" for gambling dollars spent at Mississippi casinos. In August 2018, Mississippi passed legislation to create a state lottery. Governor Phil Bryant expressed his support for the lottery to fund transportation in the state and sales, initially only scratch tickets, began on November 25, 2019. Mega Millions and Powerball tickets became available to the state on January 30, 2020.

Alaska and Hawaii, being outside the contiguous United States, have not felt the pressure of losing sales to competitors. However, in February 2020, Alaska's governor Mike Dunleavy introduced legislation proposing the establishment of an Alaska Lottery Corporation, as part of an effort to overcome a budgetary deficit.

=== New technologies ===
In recent years, new applications such as Lotto.com, Lottery.com, and Jackpocket were created for people to purchase state lottery tickets over their smartphones.

== U.S. lotteries ==
Map of U.S. states and territories offering Powerball, the most extensively offered lottery — Mega Millions is offered by the same states and territories with the exception of Puerto Rico.

State or territory	Lottery	Year of first ticket sales	Other joint games
Alabama	No	–	–
Alaska	No	–	–
American Samoa	No	–	–
Arizona	Yes	1981	0
Arkansas	Yes	2009	MFL
California	Yes	1985	0
Colorado	Yes	1983	MFL
Connecticut	Yes	1972	MFL
Delaware	Yes	1974	LA
District of Columbia	Yes	1982	MFL
Florida	Yes	1988	0
Georgia	Yes	1993	MFL
Guam	No	–	–
Hawaii	No	–	–
Idaho	Yes	1989	LA, MFL
Illinois	Yes	1974	0
Indiana	Yes	1989	MFL
Iowa	Yes	1985	LA, MFL
Kansas	Yes	1987	2by2, LA, MFL
Kentucky	Yes	1989	MFL
Louisiana	Yes	1991	0
Maine	Yes	1974	LA, MFL, TSM
Maryland	Yes	1973	0
Massachusetts	Yes	1971	MFL
Michigan	Yes	1972	MFL
Minnesota	Yes	1988	LA
Mississippi	Yes	2019	LA, MFL
Missouri	Yes	1986	0
Montana	Yes	1986	LA, MFL
Nebraska	Yes	1993	2by2, LA, MFL
Nevada	No	–	–
New Hampshire	Yes	1964	MFL, TSM
New Jersey	Yes	1969	MFL
New Mexico	Yes	1996	LA
New York	Yes	1967	MFL
North Carolina	Yes	2005	MFL
North Dakota	Yes	2004	2by2, LA, MFL
Northern Mariana Islands	No	–	–
Ohio	Yes	1974	MFL
Oklahoma	Yes	2005	LA, MFL
Oregon	Yes	1985	0
Pennsylvania	Yes	1972	MFL
Puerto Rico	Yes	1934	0 (Note: Puerto Rico Lottery participates in Powerball only; they do not participate in Mega Millions.)
Rhode Island	Yes	1974	MFL
South Carolina	Yes	2002	0
South Dakota	Yes	1987	LA, MFL
Tennessee	Yes	2004	LA, MFL
Texas	Yes	1992	0
Utah	No	–	–
U.S. Virgin Islands	Yes	1937	0 (Note: USVI also participates in the games of the Caribbean Lottery, which is also played in several other Caribbean countries. Only the USVI participates in Powerball and Mega Millions, however.)
Vermont	Yes	1978	MFL, TSM
Virginia	Yes	1988	MFL
Washington	Yes	1982	0
West Virginia	Yes	1984	LA, MFL
Wisconsin	Yes	1988	0
Wyoming	Yes	2013	2by2, MFL

Key

- 2by2 = 2by2
- LA = Lotto America
- MFL = Millionaire for Life
- TSM = Tri-State Megabucks consortium
- 0 = only multi-jurisdictional games are Mega Millions or Powerball

=== Other joint U.S. lotteries ===
==== Current ====
These games also are offered by multiple lotteries. Some of these games feature a shared progressive jackpot (noted by °):

- 2by2 (four lotteries): Kansas, Nebraska, North Dakota, Wyoming
- Lotto America° (13): Delaware, Idaho, Iowa, Kansas, Maine, Minnesota, Montana, Nebraska, New Mexico, North Dakota, Oklahoma, South Dakota, Tennessee, West Virginia
- Millionaire for Life (31): Arkansas, Colorado, Connecticut, District of Columbia, Georgia, Idaho, Indiana, Iowa, Kansas, Kentucky, Maine, Massachusetts, Michigan, Mississippi, Montana, Nebraska, New Hampshire, New Jersey, New York, North Carolina, North Dakota, Ohio, Oklahoma, Pennsylvania, Rhode Island, South Dakota, Tennessee, Vermont, Virginia, West Virginia, Wyoming
- Tri-State Lottery (Megabucks°, Gimme 5, Pick 3 (Day & Night), Pick 4 (Day & Night), Fast Play°): Maine, New Hampshire, Vermont

==== Former ====
- Cash4Life (2014–2026; 10 lotteries): Florida, Georgia, Indiana, Maryland, Missouri, New Jersey, New York, Pennsylvania, Tennessee, Virginia
- Lucky for Life (2009–2026; 23 lotteries): Arkansas, Colorado, Connecticut, Delaware, District of Columbia, Idaho, Iowa, Kansas, Kentucky, Maine, Massachusetts, Michigan, Montana, Nebraska, New Hampshire, North Carolina, North Dakota, Ohio, Oklahoma, Rhode Island, South Dakota, Vermont, Wyoming

== See also ==
- Gambling in the United States
- Lottery jackpot records
- Sweepstake
