= Megabucks =

Megabucks may refer to:

== Lottery games ==
- Megabucks, operated by the Massachusetts Lottery
- Megabucks, operated by the Oregon Lottery
- Megabucks, operated by the Wisconsin Lottery
- Tri-State Megabucks (formerly Tri-State Megabucks Plus), operated by the Tri-State Lottery in Maine, New Hampshire, and Vermont

== Other uses ==
- Mega Bucks, a professional wrestling team

== See also ==
- Mega Millions, an American multi-state lottery game
