= New Hampshire Lottery =

Lottery of the U.S. state of New Hampshire

New Hampshire Lottery Commission
Agency overview
- Formed: August 1, 1963
- Jurisdiction: New Hampshire
- Headquarters: 14 Integra Drive; Concord, New Hampshire
- Motto: Over $2 Billion and Counting For Our Schools
- Agency executive: Debra Douglas, Chairperson
- Website: nhlottery.com/About-Us

The New Hampshire Lottery was established in 1964, (Note: New Hampshire's state lottery was originally known as the New Hampshire Sweepstakes.) making it the third-oldest lottery in the United States, (Note: The Puerto Rico Lottery has been in operation since 1934 and the Virgin Islands Lottery since 1937.) and the oldest in the contiguous United States. New Hampshire's lottery games include Lucky for Life, Mega Millions, Powerball, Tri-State Megabucks Plus, and numerous scratch tickets. All New Hampshire Lottery games require players to be at least 18 years old.

New Hampshire is part of the Iowa-based Multi-State Lottery Association (MUSL), having joined it in 1995. New Hampshire is also a member of the Tri-State Lottery, operated in conjunction with the Maine Lottery and Vermont Lottery. Established in 1985, the Tri-State Lottery was the nation's first multi-jurisdictional lottery. New Hampshire hosts these drawings. (Note: Mega Millions draws are held in Georgia, while Powerball is drawn in Florida.)

The state's lottery is overseen by the three-member New Hampshire Lottery Commission. Initially known as the Sweepstakes Commission, its first members were sworn into office on August 1, 1963. Commission members are nominated by the Governor of New Hampshire for three-year terms and must be approved by the Governor's Council.

== History ==
The New Hampshire Sweepstakes was approved by the New Hampshire General Court (state legislature) in 1963, at the urging of Representative Larry Pickett, from Keene, who had proposed the idea five times over the prior decade.

A special election, on March 10, 1964, allowed residents of New Hampshire's cities and towns to vote for or against the sale of Sweepstakes tickets. Only 12 towns out of 224 (New London, Canterbury, New Hampton, Brookfield, Dummer, Lyman, Monroe, Piermont, Hollis, Sharon, Durham and Madbury) voted against the measure, as did one of the 78 city wards (Ward 5 in Concord). One author would later paraphrase this as "Only 13 of the state's 211 communities voted disapproval of the measure." Sweepstakes tickets went on sale two days later, on March 12, 1964.

Initially, the New Hampshire Sweepstakes was conducted by Thoroughbred horse races at Salem's Rockingham Park, with the winning numbers based on the races, rather than simply drawing numbers from a barrel or using ping pong balls, to avoid violating US anti-lottery statutes. Tickets were sold mostly in the state's liquor stores.

In September 2018, the New Hampshire Lottery offered online lottery products for the first time.

== Current draw games ==
All of New Hampshire's draw games are shared with other lotteries, with the exception of Keno.

=== Keno 603 ===
New Hampshire's version of lottery keno, called "Keno 603" (the state's area code) launched on December 15, 2017.

==== In-house Tri-State games ====
These games are always drawn in New Hampshire:

===== Pick 3 and Pick 4 =====
Pick 3 and Pick 4 are numbers games played twice daily, including Sundays. Prizes and options vary.

===== Megabucks =====
The original Megabucks, a "classic" six-number game, began in 1985. Megabucks became Megabucks Plus on July 26, 2009, then switched back as Megabucks in the late 2010s. As with Mega Millions or Powerball, Megabucks utilizes a 5+1 format; it draws 5 of 41 numbers from the first machine, and 1 of 6 from the second. Games cost $2; the minimum jackpot is $1,000,000. Drawings are Wednesdays and Saturdays.

== Multi-jurisdictional games ==
=== Mega Millions ===
Mega Millions became available in New Hampshire on January 31, 2010, the cross-selling expansion date whereby Powerball was made available in Mega Millions-only jurisdictions, and vice versa.

The newest version of Mega Millions began in October 2013. Currently, players choose 5 of 75 "white balls" and 1 of 15 gold-colored "Mega Balls." Jackpots begin at $15 million. For an additional $1, the "Megaplier" can be activated; it multiplies non-jackpot winnings by up to 5.

Mega Millions' format will change again on October 28, 2017. Among the changes is a $2 price point, Megaplier plays will be $3 each.

=== Powerball ===
New Hampshire joined Powerball in 1995. It is played in a similar fashion as Mega Millions.

==== Lotto America (future) ====
Lotto America was MUSL's first game, offered from 1988 to 1992. As New Hampshire did not join MUSL until 1995, this version of Lotto America was never offered there. The new version of Lotto America will begin on October 28, 2017, the day of the Mega Millions format change New Hampshire is waiting until 2018 to join because it began its Keno game on December 15, 2017.

=== Lucky for Life ===
In 2009, the Connecticut Lottery began Lucky4Life. Three years later, it expanded to become a regional game, now called Lucky for Life, played in six states. (The original 4+1 double matrix is now 5+1, Lucky for Life drawings remain in Connecticut).

On September 17, 2013, changes included an annuitized second prize ($25,000-per-year-for-life), first- and second-prize winners now had the option of cash in lieu of lifetime payments.

Lucky for Life, on January 25, 2015, became a quasi-national game. The most recent changes resulted in a 5/48 + 1/18 double matrix. As of April 2017, the game is offered in 22 states and the District of Columbia.

== See also ==
- Gambling in New Hampshire
