= Washington's Lottery =

Lottery of Washington state, U.S.

- Washington's Lottery logo
- Formation: November 15, 1982
- Type: Lottery System
- Headquarters: Olympia, Washington, U.S.
- Website: www.walottery.com

Washington's Lottery is the lottery system for the U.S. state of Washington, run by the state government. Its games include Mega Millions, Powerball, Keno, Lotto, Hit 5, Match 4, Pick 3, and scratch games.

The bill (H.B. 1251) creating the lottery was passed by the state legislature in 1982 (House on June 30, 1982; Senate on July 1, 1982) and signed by governor John Spellman on July 16. Washington became the sixteenth state with a lottery and only the second in the Western U.S., joining Arizona.

It was launched four months later with a one-dollar scratch ticket game titled "Pot O'Gold Instant Lottery," which began on November 15, 1982. What is now Pick 3 began as Triple Choice in January 1984, and Lotto was launched six months later in July, with a weekly drawing on Saturday evening. A second Lotto drawing on Wednesday was added on November 18, 1987, and a third on Monday on February 14, 2005.

== Games ==
Washington's Lottery offers several draw games, plus scratch ticket games. The list of draw games:

Game	Matrice(s)	Prize range
Mega Millions	5 of 70 + 1 of 25	$1†, $2†, $5†, $5†, $500†, $5,000†, $1,000,000†, or Jackpot (begins at $20 million)
Powerball	5 of 69 + 1 of 26	$4♠, $7♠, $100♠, $50,000♠, $1,000,000♠, or Jackpot (begins at $20 million)
Lotto	6 of 49	$3 through Jackpot (begins at $1 million)
Hit 5	5 of 42	Free ticket through Cashpot (begins at $100,000)
Daily Keno	10 of 80; 20 numbers drawn	Prizes vary by number of 'spots' picked and matched.
Match 4	4 of 24	$2, $20, or $10,000
Pick 3 (originally Triple Choice (1984-87), then The Daily Game (1987-2020))	3 digits from 0-9	Prizes vary by betting style.
Cash Pop	1 of 15	prizes range from $25 to $1,250 for a $5 wager for each number (here called a pop).

Laws prohibit any game from being drawn more than once daily.

† These prizes are multiplied by 2, 3, 4, or 5 if the Megaplier option was activated (this option, initially used only in Texas, was introduced to Washington's Lottery in January 2011).

♠ In January 2012, the Power Play multiplier was retired; non-jackpot prizes have fixed values regardless of whether the option was activated. In the case of second prize, a Power Play wager wins $2,000,000 cash.

A list of scratch ticket games can be found *here

== Retired games ==
This is a partial list games that have been retired and when they were active.

Name	Dates	Rules
Quinto	1990-March 2007	5 of 52 cards
Lotto Plus	May 1, 2002 - October 4, 2003	5 of 43; + 1 of 23

Quinto, for a brief period, had an add-on game called Beat the State.

== Special games ==
For its 25th anniversary in 2007, the Lottery held its first raffle, 375,000 tickets were sold, with three prizes of $1 million, four of $100,000, and 350 of $1,000. In the first drawing, all tickets were sold. In spring 2008, a second raffle was held, however, over 100,000 tickets were unsold. The cost of a ticket in both raffles was $20.

== Additional information ==
Many U.S. lotteries draw some games, such as pick-3, at least twice daily. However, local law prohibits Washington's Lottery from drawing any of its games more than once daily. This explains why its Keno is not drawn every few minutes, unlike a growing number of lotteries.

Washington was the tenth state lottery to join Mega Millions and sales began on September 6, 2002.

In April 2009, both houses of the state legislature passed a bill to allow Washington's Lottery to sell Powerball tickets, to take effect 90 days after the governor's signature, and sales began on February 3, 2010. Minimum age to purchase lottery tickets in Washington is 18.

== See also ==
- Birds, award-winning Washington Lottery television commercial
