= Lottery jackpot records =

Largest prizes awarded in lotteries

This is a list of the largest jackpots, or prizes, awarded in various lotteries.

== United States ==
All lottery winnings are subject to federal taxation (automatically reported to the Internal Revenue Service if the win is at least $600); many smaller jurisdictions also levy taxes. The IRS requires a minimum withholding of 24% of the prize (minus the wager) of any gambling win in excess of $5,000. However, the net for a major prize often is misleading; winners often owe the IRS upon filing a return because the Federal withholding was below the winner's tax obligations. Nonresident U.S. lottery winners have 30% of winnings of at least $600 withheld.

While the largest lottery prizes in the early history of U.S. state lotteries were "annuity-only," these lotteries gradually introduced a "cash option" for these games. All prizes listed below are reported as the pre-withholdings amount, as this is taxable income the player must report on their returns to be subject to taxation. Jackpots and jackpot shares listed below are annuity amounts (and the cash value). The annuities for both the Mega Millions and the Powerball are paid out in 30 annual installments, increasing 5 percent yearly.

Over time, the size of Mega Millions and Powerball jackpots has generally increased because of higher ticket prices, the larger number of states participating (especially after cross-selling was allowed), and the reduced odds of winning.

List of U.S. lottery jackpot-winning draws of $400 million or more (annuity value):

Rank	Jackpot	Cash value	Tickets	Per ticket	Game	Date	Location	Notes
1	$2.04b	$997.6m	1	$997.6m	Powerball	November 7, 2022	CA	Largest jackpot for a single ticket; largest cash value for a single ticket. Due to technical difficulties, the November 7, 2022, drawing did not take place until the morning of November 8.
2	$1.817b	$834.9m	1	$834.9m	Powerball	December 24, 2025	AR	
3	$1.787b	$820.6m	2	$410.3m	Powerball	September 6, 2025	MO, TX	
4	$1.765b	$774.1m	1	$774.1m	Powerball	October 11, 2023	CA	
5	$1.602b	$794.2m	1	$794.2m	Mega Millions	August 8, 2023	FL	
6	$1.5864b	$983.5m	3	$327.8m	Powerball	January 13, 2016	CA, FL, TN	First lottery jackpot over $1 billion.
7	$1.537b	$877.8m	1	$877.8m	Mega Millions	October 23, 2018	SC	
8	$1.350b	$724.6m	1	$724.6m	Mega Millions	January 13, 2023	ME	
9	$1.337b	$780.5m	1	$780.5m	Mega Millions	July 29, 2022	IL	
10	$1.326b	$621m	1	$621m	Powerball	April 7, 2024	OR	Due to technical difficulties, the April 6, 2024, drawing did not take place until the morning of April 7.
11	$1.269b	$571.9m	1	$571.9m	Mega Millions	December 27, 2024	CA	
12	$1.130b	$537.5m	1	$537.5m	Mega Millions	March 26, 2024	NJ	
13	$1.080b	$558.1m	1	$558.1m	Powerball	July 19, 2023	CA	
14	$1.050b	$776.6m	1	$776.6m	Mega Millions	January 22, 2021	MI	
15	$1.04b	$450.5m	1	$450.5m	Powerball	August 12, 2026	IL	
16	$980m	$452m	1	$452m	Mega Millions	November 14, 2025	GA	
17	$842.4m	$425.2m	1	$425.2m	Powerball	January 1, 2024	MI	
18	$810m	$409.3m	1	$409.3m	Mega Millions	September 10, 2024	TX	
19	$800m	$344.2m	1	$344.2m	Mega Millions	July 28, 2026	FL	
20	$768.4m	$477m	1	$477m	Powerball	March 27, 2019	WI	
21	$758.7m	$480.5m	1	$480.5m	Powerball	August 23, 2017	MA	
22	$754.6m	$407.2m	1	$407.2m	Powerball	February 6, 2023	WA	
23	$731.1m	$546.8m	1	$546.8m	Powerball	January 20, 2021	MD	
24	$699.8m	$496m	1	$496m	Powerball	October 4, 2021	CA	First Powerball jackpot won in a Monday drawing.
25	$687.8m	$396.2m	2	$198.1m	Powerball	October 27, 2018	IA, NY	
26	$656m	$474m	3	$158m	Mega Millions	March 30, 2012	IL, KS, MD	
27	$648m	$347.6m	2	$173.8m	Mega Millions	December 17, 2013	CA, GA	
28	$632.6m	$450.2m	2	$225.1m	Powerball	January 5, 2022	CA, WI	
29	$590.5m	$370.9m	1	$370.9m	Powerball	May 18, 2013	FL	
30	$587.5m	$384.7m	2	$192.4m	Powerball	November 28, 2012	AZ, MO	
31	$564.1m	$381.1m	3	$127.0m	Powerball	February 11, 2015	NC, PR, TX	
32	$560m	$264.4m	1	$264.4m	Mega Millions	June 4, 2024	IL	
33	$559.7m	$352m	1	$352m	Powerball	January 6, 2018	NH	The winner successfully sued for the right to stay anonymous.
34	$543m	$320.5m	1	$320.5m	Mega Millions	July 24, 2018	CA	
35	$536m	$378.3m	1	$378.3m	Mega Millions	July 8, 2016	IN	
36	$533m	$324.6m	1	$324.6m	Mega Millions	March 30, 2018	NJ	
37	$530m	$345.2m	1	$345.2m	Mega Millions	June 7, 2019	CA	
38	$526.5m	$243.8m	1	$243.8m	Powerball	March 29, 2025	CA	
39	$516m	$349.3m	1	$349.3m	Mega Millions	May 21, 2021	PA	
40	$502m	$252m	2	$126m	Mega Millions	October 14, 2022	CA, FL	
41	$487m	$341.7m	1	$341.7m	Powerball	July 30, 2016	NH	
42	$483m	$256.9m	1	$256.9m	Mega Millions	April 14, 2023	NY	
43	$478m	$230.5m	1	$230.5m	Powerball	October 23, 2024	GA	
44	$473.1m	$283.3m	1	$283.3m	Powerball	April 27, 2022	AZ	
45	$456.7m	$269.4m	1	$269.4m	Powerball	March 17, 2018	PA	
46	$451m	$281.9m	1	$281.9m	Mega Millions	January 5, 2018	FL	
47	$448.4m	$258.2m	3	$86.1m	Powerball	August 7, 2013	MN; NJ (2)	
48	$447.8m	$279.1m	1	$279.1m	Powerball	June 10, 2017	CA	
49	$437m	$261.8m	1	$261.8m	Mega Millions	January 1, 2019	NY	
50	$435.3m	$263.4m	1	$263.4m	Powerball	February 22, 2017	IN	
51	$431m	$314.4m	1	$314.4m	Mega Millions	September 21, 2021	NY	
52	$429.6m	$284.1m	1	$284.1m	Powerball	May 7, 2016	NJ	
53	$426m	$293m	1	$293m	Mega Millions	January 28, 2022	CA	
54	$425.3m	$242.2m	1	$242.2m	Powerball	February 19, 2014	CA	
55	$420.9m	$254.6m	1	$254.6m	Powerball	November 26, 2016	TN	

== Europe ==
Unlike in the United States, where lottery wins are taxed, European jackpots are generally tax-free (the lotteries themselves are taxed in other ways) and jackpots are paid in a lump sum. For example, in the United Kingdom's National Lottery, wagers are split between the game operator Allwyn Entertainment and the government, with Allwyn Entertainment distributing its share among prizes, operating costs, profit, Camelot's "good causes" programme, with the remainder going to the government as tax.

Examples of largest jackpots in specific European lotteries

Rank	Jackpot (local currency)	Lottery	Country	Tickets	Date	Notes
1	€371.1m	SuperEnalotto	Italy	One winning ticket split among 90 players	February 16, 2023	Europe's largest jackpot, €296.9m after tax
2	€250.0m	EuroMillions	Ireland	1	June 17, 2025	Ireland's largest jackpot
2	€250.0m	EuroMillions	France	1	August 19, 2025	
4	€230.0m	EuroMillions	United Kingdom	1	July 19, 2022	record in pound £195.7m
5	€209.1m	SuperEnalotto	Italy	1	August 13, 2019	
6	€190.0m	EuroMillions	Spain	1	October 6, 2017	Sold in Las Palmas, Canary Islands
7	€183.6m	EuroMillions	France ×2, Portugal ×1	3	February 3, 2006	
8	€177.7m	SuperEnalotto	Italy	1	October 30, 2010	Shared by 70 players
9	€163.5m	SuperEnalotto	Italy	1	October 27, 2016	
10	€147.8m	SuperEnalotto	Italy	1	August 22, 2009	Sold in Bagnone, Tuscany
11	€142.4m	EuroMillions	Belgium	1	December 9, 2025	
12	€137.3m	EuroMillions	Spain	1	June 13, 2014	Sold in Parla
13	€129.8m	EuroMillions	United Kingdom	1	October 8, 2010	
14	€129.6m	EuroMillions	United Kingdom, Spain	2	February 12, 2010	UK ticket won by Nigel Page and Justine Laycock of Cirencester
15	€126.2m	EuroMillions	Spain	1	May 8, 2009	Won by an anonymous 25-year-old single mother from Mallorca
16	€115.4m	EuroMillions	Ireland	1	July 29, 2005	Won by Dolores McNamara
17	€102.2m	EuroMillions	United Kingdom	2	November 6, 2009	Won by Les Scadding and a syndicate of 7 call center workers
18	€100.0m	EuroMillions	Belgium	1	February 9, 2007	Largest single jackpot win of Belgium is 175.0m (June 9, 2026)
18	€100.0m	EuroMillions	France	1	September 18, 2009	Sold in Venelles; shared by a syndicate of 15 players; largest single jackpot win of France is 220m
18	€100.0m	EuroMillions	United Kingdom	1	May 14, 2010	
21	£42m	National Lottery	United Kingdom	3	January 6, 1996	
22	€38.4m	State Lottery	Netherlands	1	May 10, 2013	Tax-free lump sum
23	€37.7m	National Lottery	Germany	1	October 7, 2006	Won by a nurse; largest single jackpot win of Germany is €48.6m

- €371.1 million (US$394.6 million) was the largest single-ticket jackpot in Italy's SuperEnalotto lottery, won on February 16, 2023.
- €250.0 million (US$291.2 million/£216.1 million) was the largest jackpot in the Euromillions history in the pan-European EuroMillions, won on August 19, 2025, the ticket was sold in France.
- £195.7 million was the largest prize won by a British winner in the pan-European EuroMillions in sterling currency, won on July 19, 2022.
- €120.0 million (US$134.4 million) was the largest jackpot in the Eurojackpot history, won on October 13, 2026, by one tickets in Germany.
- €98.4 million (US$112.0 million) was the largest jackpot in Spain's La Primitiva (not to be confused with El Gordo de la Primitiva), won by a single ticket holder on Thursday October 15, 2015. The ticket was purchased in Barcelona.
- £66.1 million (US$96 million) was the largest jackpot in the United Kingdom's Lotto, won on January 9, 2016, by two tickets.
- CHF 70.1 million was the largest jackpot in Switzerland's Swiss Lotto, won by 3 winning tickets on December 17, 2016.
- CHF 64.6 million (US$72.8 million) was the largest winner in Switzerland's Swiss Lotto, won on March 2, 2024.
- €50.0 million (US$57.4 million) was the largest jackpot and winner in Germany's Lotto 6 aus 49, won on September 16, 2026.
- €38.4 million (US$49.7 million) was the largest jackpot in the Netherlands draw of the Staatsloterij (State Lottery) in May 2013.
- £35.1 million (US$49.6 million) was the largest winner on the UK Lotto game in April 2016.
- Kr. 388 million (US$38 million) is the largest single ticket jackpot of Svenska Spel Lotto Drömvinsten, won on August 17, 2024
- €30,009,676 (US$31 million) was the largest jackpot in France's SuperLoto, won in May 2006 by two tickets.
- €30,000,000 (US$25.7 million) was the largest single-ticket jackpot in the French Lotto, won on December 4, 2021.
- €22.5 million (US$23.9 million) was the biggest lottery win in Hungary, which was on Eurojackpot (half of the €45 mil.) on February 10, 2017. This 7 billion forint grand prize beat a 5 billion record set up in 2003.
- Kr. 215 million (€22 million, US$30 million) was the largest single-ticket jackpot in Sweden's Lotto of Svenska Spel, won on March 27, 2010.
- €19.1 million (US$21.8 million) was the largest jackpot and largest single-ticket jackpot in Ireland's Lotto, won on January 15, 2022.
- €16 million (US$19 million) was the largest jackpot in Finland’s Lotto, won on January 31, 2026, by a single ticket.
- €13 million (US$17.9 million) was the largest jackpot in Belgium's Loterie Nationale/Nationale Loterij, won in December 2013 by one ticket.
- ₽358 million (€4.32 million/US$4.77 million) was the largest jackpot in Russia's Gosloto 6 to 45, won in February 2016 by one 1,800 rouble ticket. This is the largest jackpot in Russia.

=== Spain ===
The Spanish Christmas Lottery is considered to be the world's largest lottery. The 2011 top prize of €720 million was paid out as €4 million (US$5.2 million) to each of the 180 tickets. In 2012, the first prize was €720 million (then US$941.8 million; $1.215 billion in 2022 dollars), out of a total prize pool of €2.52 billion (US$3.297 billion; $4.255 billion in 2022 dollars). In 2016, the total prize pool was €2.310 billion ($2.414 billion). In 2020, the total prize pool was €2.38 billion ($2.897 billion).

== Other ==
Prize (local currency)	Prize in USD	Lottery	Country	Tickets	Date	Notes
R$1.091b	197.8m	Mega-Sena	Brazil	6	January 01, 2026	Brazil's largest prize. Six winners: One (digital) in Belo Horizonte (MG), one (10-person pool) in Ponta Porã (MS), one in João Pessoa (PB), one (digital) in Rio de Janeiro (RJ), one (18-person pool) in Franco da Rocha (SP), and one (digital) in São Paulo (SP). (R$181.892.881,09 each).
A$200M	131.4M	PowerBall	Australia	2	February 1, 2024	Australia's largest jackpot shared by 2 winners
R$635.4m	102.6M	Mega-Sena	Brazil	8	December 31, 2024	Eight winners: Sold two in Brasília (DF), one in Nova Lima (MG), two in Curitiba (PR), one in Pinhais (PR), one in Osasco (SP) and one in Tupã (SP). (R$79.435.770,67 each).
¥570M	89.3M	Welfare Lottery (Union Lotto)	China	1	June 12, 2012	Sold in Beijing; Asia's largest prize
A$107.6M	77.3m	PowerBall	Australia	1	January 17, 2019	Australia's largest prize winner
₩$40.7b	33M	6/45 Lotto	South Korea	1	April 2003	Won by a police officer in Chuncheon; South Korea's largest prize
HK$223M	28.5M	Mark Six	Hong Kong	4	May 2, 2026	Hong Kong's largest prize
₱1.18b	21.8m	Ultra Lotto 6/58	Philippines	2	October 14, 2018	The Philippines' largest prize as of 2020
₱741m	17.2m	Grand Lotto 6/55	Philippines	1	November 29, 2010	
