= Birds (advertisement) =

"Birds" is a television commercial for the Washington Lottery; it won a Silver Lion at the 2009 Cannes Lions International Advertising Festival, and "Best in Show" at the 2009 National ADDY Awards. SHOOT magazine placed it on their Top 10 list for Summer 2008.

First broadcast in June 2008, it depicts three flightless birds—a penguin, a chicken, and an emu—being taken hang-gliding (the chicken and the penguin are shown wearing harnesses strapped to the chest of the glider pilots; the emu's harness is suspended between two gliders).

The images of the birds in mid-air were produced by compositing video of the birds in their harnesses with video of the gliders in flight.
