= Edwin Castro (lottery winner) =

American lottery winner

Edwin Castro is an American who won the US$2.04 billion Powerball jackpot lottery, the largest Powerball jackpot in history, won on 7th November 2022.

== Biography ==
Edwin Castro grew up as one of two children in a middle-class family in California. He spent the first few years of his life in Altadena, California. When he was in the third grade, he and his family moved to La Crescenta, California. He attended Crescenta Valley High School where he played on the football and baseball team. He was an active Boy Scout, achieving the rank of Eagle Scout. He went on to study architecture at Woodbury University in Burbank, California. After college he worked as an architecture consultant.

In 2022, Castro won the $2.04 billion Powerball lottery jackpot. He chose to receive a lump sum, which was $628.5 million after taxes.

More than three months after winning the lottery, Castro claimed the jackpot. He requested that lottery officials not reveal any biographical information about him. His name was revealed due to California's public disclosure laws.

After claiming his winnings, Castro purchased a $25.5 million Los Angeles home with five bedrooms and six bathrooms. The home sits in the hills above Chateau Marmont.

Castro bought a second home in Altadena, California, for $4 million. The house is not far from the gas station where he purchased the winning ticket. The Japanese style house was built in 1953 and includes five bedrooms, four baths, and a swimming pool.

In September 2023, Castro bought a third house for $47 million. This Los Angeles house, which has panoramic views of Los Angeles, includes seven bedrooms, 11 bathrooms, an infinity pool, and a koi pond. In April 2024, a landslide narrowly missed the home.

In February 2023, a lawsuit was filed against Castro alleging that his winning lottery ticket was stolen. In September 2024, the lawsuit was dismissed due to a lack of physical evidence.

In January 2025, Castro's ocean front Malibu home was destroyed in the Palisades fire.

In the aftermath of the 2025 Altadena fire, Castro bought 15 lots for $10 million. He said the homes he intends to build on the lots will be sold to families looking to live in them rather than rent them out.
