= Tri-State Lottery =

Lottery covering Maine, New Hampshire and Vermont

Tri-State Lottery is the terminal-generated game series offered by the Maine, New Hampshire, and Vermont lotteries. It was the first multi-jurisdictional lottery. Its first multi-state game (Tri-State Megabucks) came in September 1985. The compact (as of September 2017) includes five games: Megabucks (drawn Mondays, Wednesdays and Saturdays); Pick 3 and Pick 4 (both have "day" and "night" drawings daily, including Sundays), Gimme 5 (drawn Monday to Friday), and Fast Play (terminal-generated "instant" tickets); the latter are games that differ among the three states.

== Games ==
The Tri-State lottery corporation is not part of the Multi-State Lottery Association (MUSL).

Maine, New Hampshire, and Vermont offer individual instant (scratch) games (scratch games currently are not offered through MUSL, although it created the former scratch game Midwest Millions).

== History ==
Prior to the Tri-State compact, Maine, New Hampshire, and Vermont individually operated online games, including pick-3 and pick-4 games. Maine currently offers a poker-style game that is drawn every few minutes.

Maine (a MUSL member from 1990 to 1992) returned to MUSL in 2004. All three lotteries offer Powerball. The three states also participate in the 46-jurisdiction Mega Millions. Vermont joined on January 31, 2010, Maine joined on May 9, 2010. Maine and New Hampshire also offered MUSL's Hot Lotto before it ended on October 28, 2017; Vermont offered Hot Lotto before May 2014. A new version of Lotto America debuted on November 12, 2017 as Hot Lotto's replacement. New Hampshire joined Lotto America in January 2018.

Tri-State games are not directly part of MUSL. The Iowa-based organization assists with multi-jurisdictional games. Powerball is operated by MUSL, while Mega Millions is not. Mega Millions′ draws are held in Georgia, Lucky for Life draws are held in Connecticut, where the game began in 2009 as Lucky4Life, and Powerball draws are in Florida; the first two games use traditional drawing machines and numbered balls, while Lucky for Life uses a computer random number generator (RNG) since mid-2021. Lucky for Life became a "quasi-national" game in January 2015; as of September 2017 it was available in 24 states and the District of Columbia.

The Gimme 5, began on May 12, 2013. Gimme 5 draws 5 of 39 numbers; the top prize is $100,000 split among players matching all five numbers.

Megabucks, whose original version began in 1985, became Megabucks Plus in July 2009, doubling the cost of a ticket to $2. In the late 2010s, Megabucks Plus switched back to the name Megabucks. Megabucks is a double-matrix game like Powerball, Mega Millions and Lucky for Life; players select five numbers out of a field of 1 to 41, and a "Megaball" from a field of 1 to 6.

Tri-State drawings are held in New Hampshire. These drawings use "classic" numbered balls and drawing machines, except for raffles.

New Hampshire and Vermont allow subscription play for Megabucks and Mega Millions; in the case of New Hampshire, it does not have a residency requirement for subscription play.
