= Match 4 (Washington's Lottery) =

Lottery numbers game

Match 4 is a numbers game offered by Washington's Lottery; it began on August 3, 2008. It is drawn nightly; games are $2 each.

== Rules ==
For each $2 game, a player chooses 4 numbers from 1 through 24, and/or lets the terminal choose numbers. Tickets are good for up to 10 drawings.

Players win $10,000 by matching all four numbers, $20 matching three numbers, or $2 matching two numbers.

Unlike jackpot games, the top prize does not "roll over". Additionally, if there are multiple winners, the prize is not split among the winners; all winners receive the full $10,000 regardless of the number of winners.
