= Vermont Lottery =

U.S. state lottery

The Vermont Lottery began fiscal operations as an enterprise fund in October 1977, following a 1976 referendum, and the enactment of Public Act No. 82 by the 1977 General Assembly. It is run by the Vermont Lottery Commission, which is headquartered in Berlin. Along with Maine and New Hampshire, Vermont is a member of the Tri-State Lottery.

== History ==
Chronology of game introductions:

=== 1978 ===
- February: Green Mountain Game was the lottery's first game, with weekly drawings.
- June: Scratch 'n Match was the Lottery's first instant game.

=== 1980 ===
- November 10: Pick 3 began as the Lottery's first online game; draws were nightly.

=== September 1985 ===
- Vermont-only Pick 4 began, with nightly draws.
  - Tri-State Megabucks began; its first draw was September 14. The partnership with Maine and New Hampshire began.

=== 1990 ===
- Lotto Vermont began; it was drawn Fridays.

=== 1992-1995 ===
- Tri-State Cash 5; drawn Tuesdays.

=== 1995 ===
- June 28: Pick 3 and Pick 4 became Tri-State games, joining Maine and New Hampshire; 5 Card Cash, also shared with Maine and New Hampshire, replaced Cash 5 and Lotto Vermont.

=== 2002 ===
- WinCash replaced 5 Card Cash.
- Cash Lotto (not to be confused with the New Hampshire-only game of that name), replaced WinCash.

=== 2003 ===
- June: Mid-day draws were added for Pick 3 and Pick 4.
- July: The Lottery began offering Powerball. (New Hampshire had joined Powerball in 1995; Maine joined in 2004.)
- November: Heads or Tails, drawn daily, replaced Cash Lotto.

=== 2005 ===
Triple Play, drawn Tuesdays and Fridays, replaced Heads or Tails.

=== 2007 ===
Paycheck replaced Triple Play.

=== 2009 ===
Paycheck ends.

== Finances ==
The Lottery funded about 2% of the 2007 expenditures for education, contributing $23 million of the $1.3 billion school spending. Prior to July 1, 1998, profits from the Lottery went to the government's general fund; since then profits go to the Education Fund.

== Games ==
Players must be 18 or older. Games include scratch tickets, Mega Millions, Tri-State Megabucks, and Powerball. Drawings times (Eastern Time Zone):

Game	Purchase Cutoff	Draw Schedule
Megabucks†	7:50 pm	Wednesday and Saturday 7:59 pm
Pick 3 and Pick 4†	1:00 and 6:45 pm	1:10 and 6:55 pm
Mega Millions††	9:50 pm	Tuesday and Friday 10:59 pm
Powerball†††	9:50 pm	Wednesday and Saturday 10:59 pm

†Tri-State games are always drawn in New Hampshire.

††Mega Millions usually is drawn in Atlanta.

†††Powerball usually is drawn in Florida; its home base was Iowa through 2008.

== Current Draw games ==
=== In-House Tri-State Lottery Commission draw games ===
==== Pick 3 and Pick 4 ====
Pick 3 and Pick 4 are drawn twice daily including Sundays. Prizes and options vary.

==== Megabucks ====
Megabucks Plus replaced Megabucks in July 2009; it also uses a 5+1 double matrix. The game draws 5 balls from 1 through 41, plus a megaball from 1 through 6. Games cost $2; minimum jackpot is $1,000,000. Drawings are Wednesdays and Saturdays. In the late 2010s somewhere, the name of the game's switched back as Megabucks.

==== Gimme5 ====
On May 12, 2013, Maine, New Hampshire, and Vermont began Gimme5, with a top prize of $100,000 cash, to be split if there are multiple winners. Drawings are Mondays, Wednesdays, and Fridays.

=== Multi-jurisdictional draw games ===
==== Lucky for Life ====
In 2009, the Connecticut Lottery began an in-house game, Lucky4Lífe, which became a regional game three years later, and became Lucky for Life. (Its drawings remain in Connecticut.) The top prize is $1,000-per-day for life; multiple winners split the prize.

On September 17, 2013, Lucky for Life was revamped; changes include a $25,000-per-year second prize. Winners of either annuitized prize level are allowed to choose cash in lieu of the lifetime annuity, unlike the top prize in the previous versions.

In January 2015, Lucky for Life became a "quasi-national" game. Players now choose 5 of 48 white balls and a green "Lucky Ball" numbered 01 through 18. As of April 2017, the game is offered in 22 states and the District of Columbia, with three more states expected to join.

==== Mega Millions ====
In October 2009, the Mega Millions consortium and MUSL reached an agreement to cross-sell Mega Millions and Powerball in American lotteries wishing to offer both games. The Vermont Lottery added Mega Millions on January 31, 2010, the cross-selling expansion day.

The current version of Mega Millions (drawn Tuesdays and Fridays) began on October 28, 2017; its jackpot starts at $40 million, with minimum rollovers of $5 million. Players choose 5 of 70 "white ball" numbers, and a gold-colored "Mega Ball"; the latter is numbered 1 through 25. For an extra $2. a player can activate the "Megaplier" option, which multiplies non-jackpot winnings by up to 5.

==== Powerball ====
In 2003, the Vermont Lottery added Powerball, which began in 1992. Jackpots begin at $40 million; the game is drawn Mondays, Wednesdays and Saturdays.

As of April 2017, Vermont has yet to sell a jackpot-winning ticket for either Mega Millions or Powerball.
