= Maine Lottery =

The Maine Lottery is run by the government of Maine. It is a member of the Multi-State Lottery Association (MUSL), whose flagship game is Powerball. It was founded in 1974 after being approved through a voter referendum.

Maine originally joined MUSL in 1990, before the Iowa-based organization began Powerball; Maine pulled out two years later, when Powerball was introduced. Maine did not rejoin MUSL until 2004. (Powerball drawings moved to Florida in 2009, although MUSL headquarters remain in Iowa). MUSL's smaller jackpot game Hot Lotto is Maine's first continuing draw game to have its winning numbers drawn via random number generator (RNG) instead of using traditional lottery balls.

An agreement was reached on October 13, 2009, for Mega Millions and Powerball to be available through any US lottery. Maine began sales of Mega Millions on May 9, 2010, after most lotteries began offering both games on January 31, 2010. The Portland Press Herald, on March 31, 2010, reported that the Supplemental Budget had passed; it included a provision to require Maine to join Mega Millions on May 9, 2010. WCSH-TV (NBC) in Portland reported that Gov. Baldacci signed the Supplemental Budget on March 31, 2010.

Currently, 46 lotteries offer Mega Millions and Powerball. Since rejoining MUSL in 2004, Maine has not sold a Powerball jackpot ticket; it sold its first Mega Millions jackpot ticket in January 2023. Maine's largest lottery prize was from Lotto*America during its first incarnation with MUSL.

All of Maine's draw games are shared with other lotteries; its "smallest" online games are those offered by the Tri-State Lottery; whose drawing games, also available in Vermont and New Hampshire, are always drawn in New Hampshire. Maine also offers scratch tickets.

== Current Draw games ==
=== In-house Tri-State games ===
Drawings for these games, played in Maine, New Hampshire, and Vermont, are held in New Hampshire(except for World Poker Tour, which is a Maine state game only):

==== Pick 3 ====
Pick 3 is drawn twice daily. Prizes and options vary.

==== Pick 4 ====
Pick 4 is drawn in conjunction with Pick 3.

==== Gimme 5 ====
Gimme 5, began on May 12, 2013. Gimme 5 draws 5 of 39 numbers; the top prize is $100,000 split among plays matching all five numbers. Drawings takes place on Monday through Friday (originally was on Mondays, Wednesdays and Fridays).

==== World Poker Tour Featuring All In(retired) ====
World Poker Tour was drawn nightly and offered 2 chances to win for only $2. Every ticket could win twice per day; instantly and in the nightly drawing. The top prize in the instant game was $5,000(for the Royal Flush combination), and the top prize in the nightly drawings was $100,000(for matching all 5 cards). For an extra $1 per Hand, the "ALL IN" feature paid bigger prizes on the top 5 instant win hands and included a chance to win the progressive jackpot. Nightly drawings were held every night after 9:05pm.

==== Megabucks ====
Megabucks Plus has a similar format as Mega Millions or Powerball. As Megabucks, begun in 1985, it was a "classic"-style six-number game until July 2009. Every Monday, Wednesday and Saturday, five "regular' numbers are drawn from a pool of 1 to 41, and one from a second pool, of one to six. Games are $2 each; the minimum jackpot is $1,000,000(annuitized with a cash option.) In the late 2010s, Megabucks Plus switched back to the name as Megabucks.

=== Multi-jurisdictional games ===
==== Lotto America ====
This game began in November of 2017 replacing hot lotto, a game that was offered until October of that year. Players pick 5 numbers from 1-52 for the main numbers and 1 number from 1-10 for the star ball number. The odds of winning are much better in this game than in powerball and mega millions and jackpots in today’s version start at $2,000,000 and grow from there. Tickets cost $1 for each game just like its predecessor from the late 1980s. Players can purchase the game with the “all star bonus” feature for $1 more for a chance to multiply their non jackpot winnings up to 5 times. Drawings are held on Mondays Wednesdays and Saturdays at 9:15 PM and are conducted using a computer system to determine the winning numbers (a random number generator).

==== Lucky for Life ====
Connecticut's in-state draw game Lucky4Lìfe, which began in 2009, became a regional game three years later. Now called Lucky for Life, it replaced the Tri-State game Weekly Grand Extra.

The third version of the game began on September 17, 2013. As with the first multi-state Lucky for Life, first prize is $1000-per-day-for-life (split by multiple winners); the current game has a second prize of $25,000-per-year-for-life. For the first time, a winner of a "lifetime" (first- or second- prize) has the option of choosing cash.

The current version, which began on January 27, 2015, is offered by 22 lotteries plus the District of Columbia. Players choose 5 of 48 white balls, and a "Lucky Ball" from 18 green balls in the second machine.

==== Mega Millions ====
Maine joined Mega Millions on May 9, 2010, several months after U.S. lotteries, which initially could offer either Mega Millions or Powerball, could add the other game. Mega Millions plays are $2 each; with Megaplier, $3. Jackpots begin at $20 million.

Mega Millions' most recent format change was in October 2017.

==== Powerball ====
Powerball jackpots begin at $40 million(annuitized), and increase by at least $10 million if not won. Games cost $2 each; with Power Play, $3. There are nine prize levels; second prize is $1,000,000(cash) in a $2 game; if Power Play was selected, $2,000,000.

Maine had been a MUSL member from 1990 to 1992, offering Lotto*America; Maine opted out of MUSL when Lotto*America was replaced by Powerball.

== Instant Tickets/Fast Play ==
Maine offers scratch-off tickets with price points of $1, $2, $3, $5, $10, $20, and $25. Maine also offers Fast Play terminal-generated "instant tickets". Fast Play tickets are part of the Tri-State compact.

== See also ==
- Gambling in Maine
- Lotteries in the United States
