= South Carolina Education Lottery =

Public lottery in South Carolina, US

- Region: South Carolina
- First draw: January 7, 2002
- Regulated by: South Carolina Lottery Commission
- Odds of winning jackpot: 292,201,338 to 1 (Powerball); 290,472,336 to 1 (Mega Millions); 850,668 to 1 (Palmetto Cash 5); 15 to 1 (Cash Pop)
- Number of games: 7
- Website: www.sceducationlottery.com

The South Carolina Education Lottery (SCEL) began in 2002.

South Carolina is a member of the Multi-State Lottery Association (MUSL), best known for Powerball. Like most US lotteries, on January 31, 2010, it participated in the cross-sell lottery expansion, adding Mega Millions.

SCEL-only games consist of Pick 3, Pick 4, Palmetto Cash 5 and Cash Pop.

The minimum age to purchase SCEL tickets is 18.

== Current draw games ==
=== In-house draw games ===
==== Pick-3 ====
This game is drawn 13 times a week, every week except for the week of Christmas Day when it’s only drawn 12 times as there are no midday drawings on Sunday and Christmas Day. The pick 3 machine has 3 compartments each containing 10 balls numbered 0 through 9. The lottery draws one number from each compartment. Prices, prizes, and options vary.

==== Pick 4 ====
Pick 4 also is drawn 13 times weekly except for the week of Christmas Day. The system for selecting the numbers is the same as the pick 3 game and made up from a 4 compartment machine. Prices, prizes, and options vary.

===== Fireball =====
On May 3, 2021, the South Carolina Education Lottery added fireball to its pick 3 and pick 4 games. Adding fireball gives players an extra number to improve their chances of winning a prize. Activating the fireball feature doubles the price of each set of numbers that the player activated the fireball feature and can be added to any of the play styles that either game offers. During each pick 3 and pick 4 drawings, after the winning numbers are selected for the base game an additional ball is drawn for fireball from a pool of 10 balls numbered 0-9 and it applies to both pick 3 and pick 4. Players can use the fireball number to replace any one of the lottery drawn numbers to make a fireball prize winning combination & win a fireball prize. Fireball prizes are separate and can be won in addition to the base game prizes. The odds of winning fireball prizes depend on the numbers chosen and play type.

==== Palmetto Cash 5 (formally Carolina 5) ====
This game began on Jun. 8, 2002 as Carolina 5, starting out as a weekly game before gradually becoming a daily game. In February 2005, the name of this game changed to Palmetto Cash 5. It draws 5 numbers from 1 through 42. Palmetto Cash 5 also features a Multiplier, that allows the player to multiply their non-jackpot winnings, by 2, 3, 5, or 10 times. Games cost $2 each, and include the Multiplier feature, that works the same way as the two multi-state games' multipliers. The jackpot starts at $100,000, and grows by at least $10,000 with each draw, that goes without a winner.

Before March 3rd, 2024, it drew 5 numbers from 1 to 38. Games costed at $1. It also had a Power-Up multiplier that was randomly drawn from 28 balls(16 being marked with a "2", 10 with a "3", and 1 each with a "5" and a "10"). The Power-Up option costed an additional $1 per game. The top prize was set at $100,000. Unlike Mega Millions's Megaplier, and Powerball's PowerPlay, the Power-Up multiplier also applied to the top prize, meaning players could multiply their winnings up to $1 million cash with every game that has a $2 purchase ($1 base game play and a $1 Power-Up add on). The top prize for the base game had a $1 million liability limit and the top prize for the Power-Up feature had a $2.5 million liability limit for each drawing.

==== Cash Pop ====
This game began on January 17th, 2022. Players can choose one or more numbers from 1-15 and choose either a $1, $2, $5 or a $10 wager on each number that they choose. Players can choose all the numbers to be guaranteed a winner for the drawing. The SCEL draws one number from balls numbered 1–15. If the player matches the winning number drawn, he/she wins a prize shown on the printed Cash Pop ticket. The player can also win a prize instantly, though the chances of winning instantly are better than on a drawing. Players can wager up to $900 each time they ask for a Cash Pop ticket. Cash Pop drawings take place immediately after the Pick 3 and Pick 4 midday drawings and after the Palmetto Cash 5 drawing.

=== Multi-State Games ===
==== Powerball ====
The SCEL joined the game on October 9, 2002. Players pick 5 numbers from 1-69 for the white balls and one bonus number from 1-26 for the powerball. Players win a prize by matching 3 out of the 5 white balls drawn with or without the powerball or by matching the powerball number with 2, 1, or 0 white balls. Each set of numbers costs $2 for the Base game. Players can also add the power play and/or double play features, each for $1 more. The parimutuel jackpot starts at $40,000,000 annuity or an available cash option. The double play drawing takes place immediately after the main powerball drawing.

==== Mega Millions ====
The SCEL was among the powerball members to join the game during the 2010 cross sell expansion. Players pick 5 numbers from 1-70 for the White balls and one bonus number from 1-25 for the Mega Ball. players win prizes by matching at least 3 out of the 5 white ball numbers drawn with or without the mega ball or matching the mega ball with 2, 1 or 0 white balls drawn. Each set of numbers costs $2 for the base game. For an extra $1 on each set, the players can ADD megaplier to multiply any non jackpot prize up to 5 times. The parimutuel jackpot starts at $40,000,000 annuity or an available cash option.

=== Former Games ===
The South Carolina Education Lottery offered several games which would later be discontinued for a reason.

These games include:

==== Mega Match 6 ====
This game began on January 30, 2008, as a 6/37 game. Players got 3 sets of numbers for $5 to try to win a progressive jackpot that starts at $550,000. Drawings were held on Tuesday and Friday nights. Players won prizes for matching 4 or more numbers on each line and as few as 5 numbers on all 3 lines to the lottery’s drawn numbers. On December 2, 2009, the SCEL announced that this game would end on the drawing on Tuesday, December 29, 2009, to avoid confusion with the multi state Mega Millions game that the lottery has joined in January 2010.

==== Carolina Cash 6 ====
This game began on April 2, 2013, as a 6/38 game. Players would pick 6 numbers from 1–38 to try to win a top prize of $200,000 taxes paid. Players got 3 sets of numbers for $2. Players won prizes by matching 3 or more numbers on each line and as few as 5 numbers on all 3 lines to the lottery’s drawn numbers. On August 12, 2013, the SCEL announced that the game would end after the October 17, 2013 drawing after sales for the game which was introduced in April of that same year fell short of expectations with player interest.

==== Lucky For Life ====
The game started in South Carolina on Tue, Jan 27, 2015 whenever the format changed to 5/48 + 1/18. Players would pick 5 numbers from a field of 48 and one lucky ball from a field of 18. Each set of numbers cost $2. The top prize ($1,000 a day for life) was won by matching all the numbers on one set. The second prize ($25,000 a year for life) was won by matching all 5 white balls w/o the lucky ball. Players had to match at least one white ball with the lucky ball or match just the lucky ball to win a prize. South Carolina was also the first lucky for life participating state to have a top prize winner after the game offered the current format. On Tue, Apr 22, 2021, the SCEL announced that it would end its participation of this game on the drawing on Mon, Jun 28, 2021 drawing to explore some exciting new game opportunities for players that will launch in the coming months and enhance funding for education.
