= Powerball =

American and British lottery game

- Predecessor: Lotto America
- Formation: April 19, 1992; 34 years ago
- Type: Lottery draw
- Headquarters: Florida Lottery (drawing); Multi-State Lottery Association (administration)
- Location(s): United States and United Kingdom
- Owner: Multi-State Lottery Association
- Website: powerball.com

- Highest jackpot: $2.04 billion
- Odds of winning jackpot: 292,201,338 to 1
- Website: powerball.com

Powerball
- Genre: Lottery
- Presented by: Mike Pace; Tracy Wiu; Elizabeth Hart; Scott Adams; Sam Arlen; Laura Johnson; Michelle Lyles; Randy Traynor
- Country of origin: United States
- Original language: English
- No. of seasons: 33

Production
- Running time: 1 Minute
- Production companies: Multi-State Lottery Association; Florida Lottery

Original release
- Network: Syndicated

Powerball is an American lottery game offered by 45 states, the District of Columbia, Puerto Rico, U.S. Virgin Islands and the United Kingdom, and overseen by the Multi-State Lottery Association (MUSL), which also manages other large jackpot games such as the Mega Millions. Drawings are held three times weekly on Mondays, Wednesdays, and Saturdays at 10:59 p.m. Eastern Time, at the Florida Lottery's headquarters in Tallahassee.

The winning numbers are made up of five "white balls" from a matrix of 69 and one red "Powerball" from a matrix of 26, resulting in jackpot odds of 1 in 292,201,338 per play. Each play costs two dollars, but players in some states can add Power Play, which allows players to increase the payout of their winning numbers, or Double Play, which allows players to use their numbers in a second, concurrent drawing with a different prize pool, each for an additional dollar. The official cutoff for ticket sales is 10:00 p.m. Eastern Time; some lotteries cut off sales earlier. Powerball's minimum jackpot starts at $20 million annuity. Powerball jackpot winners have the choice of taking the annuity or lump sum cash prize (although in the UK only an annuity is provided). The annuity is paid in 30 graduated installments over 29 years with each annuity payment increasing 5% annually, whereas the lump sum payment, with a cash value of about half of the advertised jackpot, is paid all at once.

Powerball is known for producing some of the largest lottery jackpots in history, including the record-breaking $2.04 billion jackpot won by Edwin Castro.

== Powerball members ==
Map of all U.S. states and territories offering Powerball

=== Mega Millions and Powerball ===
Lottery	Powerball	Mega Millions
Arizona	April 4, 1994	April 18, 2010
Arkansas	October 31, 2009	January 31, 2010
California	April 8, 2013	June 22, 2005
Connecticut	November 28, 1995	January 31, 2010
Colorado	August 2, 2001	May 16, 2010
Delaware	January 14, 1991	January 31, 2010
District of Columbia	February 13, 1988	January 31, 2010
Florida	January 4, 2009	May 15, 2013
Georgia	January 31, 2010	September 6, 1996
Idaho	February 1, 1990	January 31, 2010
Illinois	January 31, 2010	September 6, 1996
Indiana	October 14, 1990	January 31, 2010
Iowa	February 13, 1988	January 31, 2010
Kansas	February 13, 1988	January 31, 2010
Kentucky	January 10, 1991	January 31, 2010
Louisiana	March 5, 1995	November 16, 2011
Maine	July 30, 2004	May 9, 2010
Maryland	January 31, 2010	September 6, 1996
Massachusetts	February 3, 2010	September 6, 1996
Michigan	January 31, 2010	September 6, 1996
Minnesota	August 14, 1990	January 31, 2010
Mississippi	January 30, 2020	January 30, 2020
Missouri	February 13, 1988	January 31, 2010
Montana	November 9, 1989	March 1, 2010
Nebraska	July 21, 1994	March 20, 2010
New Hampshire	November 5, 1995	January 31, 2010
New Jersey	January 31, 2010	May 26, 1999
New Mexico	October 20, 1996	January 31, 2010
New York	January 31, 2010	May 17, 2002
North Carolina	May 30, 2006	January 31, 2010
North Dakota	March 25, 2004	January 31, 2010
Ohio	April 16, 2010	May 17, 2002
Oklahoma	January 12, 2006	January 31, 2010
Oregon	February 13, 1988	March 28, 2010
Pennsylvania	June 29, 2002	January 31, 2010
Puerto Rico	September 28, 2014	Not offered
Rhode Island	February 13, 1988	January 31, 2010
South Carolina	October 6, 2002	January 31, 2010
South Dakota	November 15, 1990	May 16, 2010
Tennessee	April 21, 2004	January 31, 2010
Texas	January 31, 2010	December 5, 2003
US Virgin Islands	November 14, 2010	October 4, 2010
Vermont	July 1, 2003	January 31, 2010
Virginia	January 31, 2010	September 6, 1996
Washington	January 31, 2010	September 4, 2002
West Virginia	February 13, 1988	January 31, 2010
Wisconsin	August 10, 1989	January 31, 2010
Wyoming	August 24, 2014	August 24, 2014
Non US: United Kingdom	July 21, 2026	Not offered

Alabama, Alaska, Hawaii, Nevada, and Utah do not have state lotteries.

== History ==
=== 1988 precursor: Lotto America ===
Powerball's predecessor began in 1988; the multi-state game was known as Lotto America. The game, and name, were changed to Powerball on April 19, 1992; its first drawing was held April 22.

=== 1992: Powerball begins ===
When it was launched in 1992 Powerball became the first game to use two drums. Using two drums to draw numbers from offers more manipulation of the probabilities by simultaneously allowing low jackpot odds, numerous prize levels, and high overall odds of winning (as explained later, a ticket can win by matching only one number). The two-drum concept was suggested by Steve Caputo of the Oregon Lottery. The two-drum concept has since been used by The Big Game (Mega Millions) in the US, Australia's Powerball, Thunderball in the UK, Eurojackpot and EuroMillions.

Through 2008, Powerball drawings usually were held at Screenscape Studios in West Des Moines, Iowa. The drawings' host was longtime Iowa radio personality Mike Pace, who had hosted MUSL drawings since Lotto America began in 1988. In 1996, Powerball went "on the road" for the first time, holding five remote drawings at the Summer Olympics in Atlanta. A few weeks later, Georgia became the only jurisdiction to leave Powerball (Maine, which joined MUSL in 1990, left when Powerball began). In August 1996, Georgia joined the then-new The Big Game, then the other major U.S. lottery group. It planned to sell tickets for both games for the rest of 1996; but within days Georgia was removed from MUSL, not to return until the 2010 cross-sell expansion.

On November 2, 1997, the annuity was changed from 20 to 25 yearly payments and the cash option was added.

In 1998, Florida was given permission by its government to participate in a multi-state game. It was set to offer Powerball but in early 1999, new governor Jeb Bush barred Florida from joining since he believed Powerball would hurt the existing Florida Lottery games. In 2008, Governor Charlie Crist allowed Florida to join MUSL on January 4, 2009.

=== 2001: Introduction of Power Play ===
On March 7, 2001, an optional multiplier (called Power Play) was added, allowing players to multiply non-jackpot winnings by up to five by paying an extra $1 per game. A wheel was introduced to choose the Power Play multiplier for each drawing (the next year, the 1x was removed from the Power Play wheel).

=== 2009: Move to Florida ===
With the start of Powerball sales in Florida on January 4, 2009 at its first drawing on January 7, the matrices changed to 5/59 + 1/39 (adding four white ball numbers and dropping three red balls). This changed the jackpot probability from 1:146 million to 1:195 million; the overall probability became 1:35.

Based on statistical projections, the average jackpot win increased from $95 million to $141 million. Over 3.5 million additional prizes were expected to be won yearly due to the change in probability. The starting jackpot increased to $20 million, with minimum rollovers of $5 million. The jackpot contribution increased from 30.3% to 32.5% of total sales. The Power Play option was modified; second prize, usually $200,000, was given an automatic 5x multiplier, making the 5+0 prize $1 million cash. The bonus second prize if the jackpot exceeded its previous record by $25 million, triggered only twice, was eliminated with the 2012 format change.

The conditions for Florida joining Powerball included a move of the live drawings from Iowa to Universal Studios in Orlando. The three hosts rotating announcing duties from Universal Studios were Tracy Wiu, Elizabeth Hart and Scott Adams (MUSL headquarters remained in Iowa, where its other draws are held). The wheel that was used to determine the Power Play multiplier was retired when the drawings moved to Florida; a random number generator (RNG) was used until the 2012 format change.

Arkansas became the 33rd MUSL member on October 31, 2009, the last to join before the 2010 cross-sell expansion. The Ohio Lottery added Powerball on April 16, 2010, it joined Mega Millions (along with New York) years earlier, when The Big Game added Mega Millions to its name.

=== 2010: Cross-sell expansion ===
In March 2009, it was reported that New Jersey, already a Mega Millions member, sought permission to join Powerball. Shortly after, discussions were revealed about allowing each US lottery to offer both games. On October 13, the Mega Millions consortium and MUSL reached an agreement in principle to cross-sell Mega Millions and Powerball. In November, MUSL signed an agreement to start streaming Powerball drawings online.

On January 31, 2010, the date of the cross-sell expansion, Mega Millions and MUSL each added lotteries; eight Powerball members added Mega Millions by May. The Montana Lottery joined Mega Millions on March 1, 2010. Nebraska added Mega Millions on March 20, 2010, Oregon followed on March 28, 2010, Arizona joined Mega Millions on April 18, 2010, Maine added Mega Millions on May 9, 2010, Colorado and South Dakota joined Mega Millions on May 16, 2010. The U.S. Virgin Islands joined Mega Millions in October 2010.

Before the agreement, the only places that sold both Mega Millions and Powerball tickets were retailers straddling a border; one retailer on the Sharon, Pennsylvania/Masury, Ohio, border sold both Mega Millions (via the Ohio Lottery) and Powerball (Pennsylvania) before the agreement and continued to be the only retailer to sell tickets for both lotteries.

Illinois joining Powerball on the expansion date, it became the second multi-jurisdictional lottery game (after Mega Millions, in which Illinois already participated) whose drawings were carried nationally. Both games' drawings were simulcast via Chicago cable superstation WGN-TV through its national WGN America feed. WGN-TV aired Illinois Lottery drawings nationally from 1992 to 2015 after acquiring broadcast rights from Chicago's Fox owned-and-operated station WFLD in 1988, which took the rights from WGN-TV in 1987. Powerball drawings were aired on WGN-TV and WGN America on Wednesday and Saturday immediately following the station's 9:00 p.m. (Central Time) newscast, with the Mega Millions drawings being aired Tue and Fri evenings after the newscast. WGN served as a default carrier of Mega Millions or Powerball where no local television station carries either multi-jurisdictional lottery's drawings.

On March 13, 2010, New Jersey became the first previous Mega Millions-only member (just before the cross-selling expansion) to produce a jackpot-winning Powerball ticket. It was worth over $211 million in annuity payments; it was sold in Morris Plains. On May 28, 2010, North Carolina became the first previous MUSL member (just before the cross-selling expansion) to produce a jackpot-winning Mega Millions ticket; that jackpot was $12 million (annuity).

On June 2, 2010, Ohio won a Powerball jackpot; it became the first lottery selling either Mega Millions or Powerball (when 2010 began) to provide a jackpot-winning ticket for its newer game. The ticket was worth a $261 million annuity; it was sold in Sunbury. Ohio's second Powerball jackpot-winning ticket, sold for the June 23, 2010, drawing, was part of another first; since Montana also provided a jackpot winner for that drawing, it was the first time a jackpot was shared through lotteries which sold competing games before the cross-selling expansion, as Montana sold only Powerball before the expansion date.

=== 2012 format change ===
On January 15, 2012, the price of each basic Powerball play doubled to $2, while PowerPlay games became $3; the minimum jackpot doubled to $40 million, with at least a $10 million rollover for each drawing without a jackpot winner. A non-jackpot play matching the five white balls won $1 million. The red balls decreased from 39 to 35. The drawings were moved from Universal Studios Orlando to the Florida Lottery's studios in Tallahassee. Sam Arlen began his tenure as host in 2012, while Laura W. Johnson served as Arlen’s co-host.

These changes were made to increase the frequency of nine-figure jackpots; a Powerball spokesperson believed a $500 million jackpot was feasible (it became a reality within the year,) and that the first $1 billion jackpot in US history would occur by 2012 (though it didn't occur until 4 years later.) Less than three months after the Powerball changes, Mega Millions' jackpot reached $656,000,000 despite remaining a $1-per-play game. The random Power Play multiplier was retired for a set, fixed dollar amount payout. The $25 million rollover "cap" (creating larger 5+0 prizes) was eliminated.

California joined on April 8, 2013; it has never offered the Power Play option, as all payouts in California Lottery drawing games, by law, are parimutuel. Mega Millions, which became available in California in 2005, offers its Megaplier in its other 45 jurisdictions.

On January 22, 2014, the variable Power Play option returned (2x-5x) for multiplying non-jackpot prizes.

In October 2014, Puerto Rico joined Powerball; the first mainly Spanish-speaking jurisdiction offering the game; as of 2016 it had not joined Mega Millions.

=== 2015 format change ===
On October 4, 2015, the Powerball format changed again; the white-ball pool increased from 59 to 69 while the Powerball pool decreased from 35 to 26. While this improved the chance of winning any prize to 1 in 24, it also lengthened the jackpot odds to 1 in 292,201,338. The 4+1 prize became $50,000; the 10x PowerPlay became available in drawings with a jackpot of under $150 million. Three months later, the format produced a $1.5 billion jackpot, double the previous record, after 20 consecutive rollovers.

=== 2020 COVID-19 adjustments and 2021 provisional removal by Idaho ===
On April 2, 2020, the Powerball starting jackpot amount was temporarily reset from $40 million to $20 million with the annuity option, with at least a $2 million rollover for each drawing without a jackpot winner, due to the COVID-19 pandemic in the United States. This was done to enforce social distancing and discourage crowding of selling venues for large jackpots, and to account for lower interest rates.

On March 10, 2021, following Powerball's move to expand its operations in Australia later that year and in the United Kingdom in 2022, the Idaho Legislature voted overwhelmingly to end the state's participation in the lottery after more than 30 years. State lawmakers cited fears of its domestic revenue from the games being used by those governments for issues the state's Republican majority opposed as reasons behind the vote. The removal would have taken place when non-US jurisdictions were allowed to join in August 2021, but was rendered moot when the expansion was put on hold.

=== 2021 addition of Monday drawings and introduction of Double Play ===
On May 23, 2021, Powerball announced that starting on August 23, 2021, draws would occur on Monday, in addition to Wednesday and Saturday. Along with the new Monday drawings, a new Double Play option was added for 12 states (including host state Florida) and Puerto Rico, allowing players to reuse their Powerball numbers in a second drawing (held 30 minutes after the main drawing) for a chance to win a $10 million top prize by paying an extra $1 per game.

Due to technical difficulties that occurred before the start of the new draw schedule, the first ever Monday draw did not occur on its usual time meaning that the first Monday draw did not happen as planned for the group that operates the game. Michele Lyles became the third regular hostess of the Powerball drawings serving alongside Arlen and Johnson. Randy Traynor originally served as a substitute host if neither Arlen, Johnson or Lyles are available. In 2024, Arlen retired from Powerball and the Florida Lottery and Traynor was promoted to regular host.

=== 2022 delay ===
The scheduled November 7, 2022, drawing of the record-breaking $2.04 billion jackpot was delayed due to incomplete security protocols regarding ticket sales at an unnamed lottery until the next day at 8:59 a.m. EST. Prior to the November 7 delay, there had been delays on April 9 and October 19th and on March 16, 2022. After the drawing was completed for the $2.04 billion Powerball Jackpot, the Minnesota Lottery announced later that week that it had been responsible for the delay. Lottery officials there said there was a technical problem with the communication system that prevented the drawing from occurring.

=== 2026 UK expansion ===
On April 13, 2026, Powerball and Allwyn UK announced the expansion of the game to the UK through the National Lottery. This was the first expansion outside of the United States, although as previously mentioned the game was to expand into the United Kingdom by 2022 had international expansion gone forward in 2021. The UK version of the game will feature differing lower tier prizes and prize pools, including a 2 main number tier.; only the Jackpot tier will be shared. On July 6, the release date was revealed to be on July 21, 2026 with the first draw including the UK held on July 23.. The UK version of the game features a fixed £1 Million prize for those who match five main numbers, this was first won in the draw on September 1st 2026.

In the U.K. the advertised payout is lower than in the U.S. due to it listing a net payout rather than a gross payout. In addition, U.K. jackpot winners must take the 30-year annuity payout option and are not allowed to take the discounted lump sum, but lottery winnings are also not subject to tax like in the U.S.

== System of the game ==
=== Basic game ===
The minimum Powerball bet is $2 in the United States and £4 in the United Kingdom. The higher ticket price in the UK, after the currency exchange rate has been taken into account, is because the UK has an additional prize tier (Match 2) which increases the overall odds of winning a prize and so the total value of prizes paid; and all applicable lottery taxation is included upfront within the purchase price of the ticket as all prizes are paid tax free to the winner (subject to a UK jackpot winner being eligible to file US IRS forms W-7 and W-8BEN to obtain Double Taxation Treaty benefits which is a citizenship-dependent, not a UK residence-dependent or visitor eligibility - otherwise the US-funded portion of the jackpot will be subject to US withholding tax).

In each game, players select five numbers from a set of 69 white balls and one number from 26 red Powerballs; the red ball number can be the same as one of the white balls. The drawing order of the five white balls is irrelevant; all tickets show the white ball numbers in ascending order. Players cannot use the drawn Powerball to match one of their white numbers, or vice versa. Players can select their own numbers, or have the terminal pseudorandomly select the numbers (the name for this varies by state, but most are called some variation of "quick pick", "easy pick", etc.).

In each drawing, winning numbers are selected using two ball machines: one containing the white balls and the other containing the red Powerballs. Five white balls are drawn from the first machine and the red ball from the second machine. Games matching at least three white balls or the red Powerball win.

Two identical machines are used for each drawing, randomly selected from four sets. Originally, the model of machine was the Criterion, manufactured by Beitel Lottery Products (as was the previous Lotto America machines), however in 2001, the model of machine used is the Halogen, manufactured by Smartplay International of Edgewater Park, New Jersey. There are eight ball sets (four of each color); one set of each color is randomly selected before a drawing. The balls are mixed by a turntable at the bottom of the machine that propels the balls around the chamber. When the machine selects a ball, the turntable slows to catch it, sends it up the shaft, and then down the rail to the display (the Florida Lottery was considering switching to a random number generator in 2019 for its in-state drawings; it is unknown whether Powerball was affected). If the onsite location is unavailable, as was the case during Hurricane Michael and again during Hurricane Helene, a backup machine is located at MUSL headquarters in Iowa. The drawings are supervised by Carroll & Company, CPA’s.

The double matrices and probabilities in the game's history:

Starting date	Pick 5 White Balls from Field of	Pick 1 Red Ball from Field of	Jackpot chance	Power Play multiplier
April 22, 1992	45	45	1:54,979,154	None†
November 5, 1997	49	42	1:80,089,127	None†
March 7, 2001	49	42	1:80,089,127	1×-5×
October 9, 2002	53	42	1:120,526,769	2×-5×
August 28, 2005	55	42	1:146,107,961	2×-5×
January 7, 2009	59	39	1:195,249,054	2×-5×
January 15, 2012	59	35	1:175,223,510	None
January 19, 2014	59	35	1:175,223,510	2×-5×
July 7, 2015	69	26	1:292,201,338	2×-5×; 10×‡

†Power Play was introduced in 2001.
‡10× available if jackpot is $150 million or less.

While Mega Millions and Powerball each have similar jackpot odds despite having a different double matrix (Mega Millions is 5/70 + 1/25), since Powerball is $2 per play, it now takes $584,402,676 (not counting Power Play side bets) on average to produce a jackpot-winning ticket.

=== Power Play ===
In the United States, a player may activate the Power Play option for an additional $1 per game. Activating it multiplies lower-tier winnings (base prize $50,000 or less) by up to 5, or 10 when the jackpot is under $150 million. Power Play is drawn separately from the 6 numbers. The 5+0 prize is automatically doubled to $2 million if Power Play is activated.

The dilemma for players is whether to maximize the chance at the jackpot or increase lower-tier winnings. If a player selects a fixed amount of money to spend on tickets at a certain time, the player will give up one guess of the winning set of numbers every two times this player activates Power Play in respect of one of the purchased tickets.

Power Play, when it began in 2001, was drawn with a special wheel. In 2006 and 2007, MUSL replaced one of the 5× spaces on the Power Play wheel with a 10×. During each month-long promotion, MUSL guaranteed that there would be at least one drawing with a 10× multiplier. The promotion returned in 2008; the ball landed in the 10× space twice. After being absent in 2009, the 10× multiplier returned in May 2010 (after the Power Play drawing was changed to RNG). The promotion was extended for the only time, as the 10× multiplier was not drawn until June 12, 2010. The second prize 5× guarantee continued; the 10× applied to all non-jackpot prizes, as in previous promotions.

Power Play's success has led to similar multipliers in other games, most notably Megaplier, initially available through all Mega Millions members except California before being built into the game after a revamp in 2025. The 2012 Powerball changes resulted in all eight lower-tier levels having "fixed" Power Play prizes.

On January 19, 2014, PowerPlay was modified; it used 30 balls with the following distribution:

- 2× (15)
- 3× (9)
- 4×/5×: 3 each

On October 4, 2015, PowerPlay changed again, using 42 or 43† balls as follows:

- 2× (24)
- 3× (13)
- 4× (3)
- 5× (2)
- 10× (1)†

† 10× available when jackpot is under $150 million.

=== Double Play ===
A Double Play option is available in 14 states and Puerto Rico. (Note: Beginning August 23, 2021, Double Play became available in Colorado, Florida, Indiana, Maryland, Michigan, Missouri, New Jersey, Pennsylvania, Puerto Rico, South Carolina, South Dakota, Tennessee and Washington. Montana added Double Play in July 2022. Mississippi added Double Play option beginning November 5, 2023.) For an additional $1, players may reuse their Powerball numbers in a second drawing with a different prize structure held approximately 30 minutes after the main drawing. The Double Play top prize is worth $10 million, which stays as a fixed amount in every drawing, even if there's no winner. Unlike the main drawing's increasing jackpots, the $10 million top prize in Double Play is a not annuitized. Thus, a player is able to receive a cash lump sum worth $10 million, subject to state and federal taxes. A Powerball ticket with the Double Play option costs $3. If both the Power Play and Double Play options are chosen, then the total cost is $4.

=== Prizes and odds ===
United States payouts as of October 7, 2015:

Matches	Prize (Note: California's prize amounts are always parimutuel because its state penal code distinguishes between a "lottery" which cannot be broken and a "banked game" whose bank theoretically could be broken. Only a "lottery" was authorized by the state Lottery Act. Therefore, Power Play is not offered in California.)	Power Play 2× (1 in 1.75)	Power Play 3× (1 in 3.23)	Power Play 4× (1 in 14)	Power Play 5× (1 in 21)	Odds of winning
PB only (0+1)	$4	$8	$12	$16	$20	1 in 38.32 (Note: Odds of winning 0+1 prize are 1:38.32 instead of 1:26 as there is the possibility of also matching at least one white ball.)
1 number plus PB (1+1)	$4	$8	$12	$16	$20	1 in 91.98
2+1	$7	$14	$21	$28	$35	1 in 701.33
3+0	$7	$14	$21	$28	$35	1 in 579.76
3+1	$100	$200	$300	$400	$500	1 in 14,494.11
4+0	$100	$200	$300	$400	$500	1 in 36,525.17
4+1	$50,000	$100,000	$150,000	$200,000	$250,000	1 in 913,129.18
5+0	$1,000,000	$2,000,000 (Note: $2,000,000 fixed for match 5+0 with Power Play as of 2012 format change.)				1 in 11,688,053.52
5+1	Jackpot (Note: Power Play multipliers do not apply to jackpot. Jackpot is split among multiple winners.)					1 in 292,201,338

United Kingdom payouts as of July 21, 2026:

Matches	Prize (Note: With the exception of the prizes for matching two main balls and five main balls, the United Kingdom's prize amounts are parimutuel. Therefore, Power Play is not offered in the United Kingdom.)	Odds of winning
2 numbers (2+0)	£8 (fixed)	1 in 28
PB only (0+1)	est. £11.90	1 in 38.32
1 number plus PB (1+1)	est. £15.30	1 in 91.98
2+1	est. £30.80	1 in 701.33
3+0	est. £52.10	1 in 579.76
3+1	est. £500	1 in 14,494.11
4+0	est. £1,100	1 in 36,525.17
4+1	est. £33,000	1 in 913,129.18
5+0	£1,000,000 (fixed)	1 in 11,688,053.52
5+1	Jackpot (Note: Jackpot is paid as a lump sum over 30 years)	1 in 292,201,338

In the United States, the overall odds of winning a prize are 1 in 24.87. In the United Kingdom, these odds are about 1 in 14.

Former prizes/odds (January 19, 2014 – October 3, 2015):

Matches	Prize	Power Play 2× (1 in 2)	Power Play 3× (1 in 3 1/3)	Power Play 4× (1 in 10)	Power Play 5× (1 in 10)	Odds of winning
PB only	$4	$8	$12	$16	$20	1 in 55.41
1 number plus PB	$4	$8	$12	$16	$20	1 in 110.81
2 numbers plus PB	$7	$14	$21	$28	$35	1 in 706.43
3 numbers; no PB	$7	$14	$21	$28	$35	1 in 360.14
3 numbers plus PB	$100	$200	$300	$400	$500	1 in 12,244.83
4 numbers; no PB	$100	$200	$300	$400	$500	1 in 19,087.53
4 numbers plus PB	$10,000	$20,000	$30,000	$40,000	$50,000	1 in 648,975.96
5 numbers; no PB	$1,000,000	$2,000,000				1 in 5,153,632.65
5 numbers plus PB	Jackpot					1 in 175,223,510.00

Payouts and odds for Double Play:

Matches	Prize	Odds of winning
PB only (0+1)	$7	1 in 38.32
1+1	$10	1 in 91.98
2+1	$20	1 in 701.33
3+0	$20	1 in 579.76
3+1	$500	1 in 14,494.11
4+0	$500	1 in 36,525.17
4+1	$50,000	1 in 913,129.18
5+0	$500,000	1 in 11,688,053.52
5+1	$10,000,000	1 in 292,201,338

Overall odds of winning were 1 in 31.85.

All non-jackpot prizes are fixed amounts (except in California and, with the exception of the 2+0 and 5+0 prizes, the United Kingdom); they may be reduced and paid on a parimutuel basis, with each member paying differing amounts for the same prize tier, if the liability exceeds the funds in the prize pool for any game member.

=== Jackpot accumulation and payment options ===
Jackpot winners have the option of receiving their prize in cash (in two installments; one from the winning jurisdiction, then the combined funds from the other members) or as a graduated annuity paid in 30 yearly installments in the United States; only the annuity is available in the United Kingdom. The pre-tax amount of the first annuity payment is approximately 1.505% of the jackpot amount. Each annuity payment is 5% higher than in the previous year to adjust for inflation.

The advertised estimated jackpot represents the total payments that would be paid to jackpot winner(s) should they accept the annuity option. This estimate is based on the funds accumulated in the jackpot pool rolled over from prior drawings, expected sales for the next drawing, and market interest rates for the securities that would be used to fund the annuity. The estimated jackpot usually is 32.5% of the (non–Power Play) revenue of each base ($2/£4) play, submitted by game members to accumulate into a prize pool to fund the jackpot. The advertised jackpot in the United Kingdom accounts for the exchange rate between the US dollar and Pound sterling as well as the country's taxation requirements. If the jackpot is not won in a particular drawing, the prize pool carries over to the next drawing, accumulating until there is a jackpot winner. This prize pool is the cash that is paid to a jackpot winner if they choose cash. If the winner chooses the annuity, current market rates are used to calculate the graduated payment schedule and the initial installment is paid. The remaining funds in the prize pool are invested to generate the income required to fund the remaining installments. If there are multiple jackpot winners for a drawing, the jackpot prize pool is divided equally for all such plays.

MUSL and its members accept all investment risk and are contractually obligated and liable to the winner to make all scheduled payments to annuity winners. If a jackpot ticket is not claimed, the funds in the prize pool are returned to members in proportion to the amount they contributed to the prize pool. The members have different rules regulating how unclaimed funds are used.

When the Powerball jackpot is won, the next jackpot is guaranteed to be $20 million (annuity). If a jackpot is not won, the minimum rollover is $10 million. The cash in the jackpot pool is guaranteed to be the current value of the annuity. If revenue from ticket sales falls below expectations, game members must contribute additional funds to the jackpot pool to cover the shortage; the most likely scenario where this can occur is if the jackpot is won in consecutive drawings.

Because of the COVID-19 pandemic in the United States and resulting drop in ticket sales plus the falling interest rates on which annuity prizes were based, Powerball administrators reduced the minimum starting jackpot to $20 million, and the minimum increase to $2 million when the previous jackpot is not won.

=== Claiming prizes ===
A winning ticket must be claimed in the jurisdiction in which it was purchased, regardless of residence. The minimum age to play Powerball is 18, except in Nebraska (19), and Arizona, Iowa, Louisiana and Mississippi (21).

Generally, Powerball players do not have to choose cash or annuity unless they win a jackpot (then they usually have 60 days to choose). Exceptions include Florida and Missouri; the 60-day "clock" starts with the drawing, so a jackpot winner who wishes to take the cash option needs to make immediate plans to claim their prize. New Jersey and Texas require the cash/annuity choice to be made when playing; in New Jersey, an annuity ticket can be changed to cash after winning, while in Texas, the choice is binding (when the cash option was introduced in 1997, all Powerball players had to make the choice when playing. This regulation was phased out by 1999). In the United Kingdom, only the annuity option is allowed for jackpot winners. All Powerball prizes must be claimed within a period ranging from 90 days to a year, depending on where the ticket was bought.

Powerball winnings in California are subject to federal income tax only. Conversely, Powerball winnings in Puerto Rico are not subject to federal income tax, only local tax. There is no state income tax in Florida, South Dakota, Texas, Washington and Wyoming, and only on interest and dividends in New Hampshire and Tennessee. In all other states, winnings are subject to both federal income tax and that state's income tax, provided the winning ticket was purchased in the winner's home state. Winnings from tickets purchased outside of one's home state may be subject to the income tax laws of both states (with possible credit based on the two jurisdictions), though this depends on the states in question.

=== Secondary prizes ===
Unlike the jackpot pool, other prizes are the responsibility and liability of each participating lottery. All revenue for Powerball ticket sales not used for jackpots is retained by each member; none of this revenue is shared with other lotteries. Members are liable only for the payment of secondary prizes sold there.

Since the secondary prizes are defined in fixed amounts (except in California and most prizes in the United Kingdom), if the liability for a given prize level exceed the funds in the prize pool for that level the amount of the prize may be reduced and the prize pool be distributed on a parimutuel basis and result in a prize lower than the fixed amounts given in the prize tables. Because the secondary prize pools are calculated independently, it is possible lower-tier prizes will differ among the game members.

== Notable wins ==
Over time, the size of jackpots has increased because of the higher ticket price, the larger number of states participating, and the reduced odds of winning.

Because the quoted jackpot amount is an annuity of 30 graduated annual payments, its cash value relative to the annuity fluctuates. The actual ratio depends on projected interest rates and other factors. MUSL starts with the cash value, built from a percentage of sales, and then calculates the advertised jackpot amount from that value, based on the average costs of the three best securities bids.

On December 25, 2002, the president of a construction firm in Putnam County, West Virginia, won $314.9 million ($564 million after inflation), then a new record for a single ticket in an American lottery. The winner chose the cash option of $170 million, receiving approximately $83 million after West Virginia and Federal withholdings.

On October 19, 2005, a family from Jacksonville, Oregon, won $340 million ($560 million after inflation). The winners chose the cash payout of $164.4 million (before withholdings), smaller than a previous winners cash payout in 2002 due to a then-recent change in the annuity structure.

A jackpot of $365 million ($583 million after inflation) was won on February 18, 2006, by one ticket in Nebraska. It was shared by eight people who worked at a meatpacking plant. The group chose the cash option of approximately $177.3 million, before withholdings.

On August 25, 2007, a jackpot worth $314 million ($488 million after inflation) was won by a retired auto worker from Ohio; that ticket was bought in Richmond, Indiana, a community that had previously sold a jackpot-winning ticket of over $200 million.

In November 2011, three Greenwich, Connecticut, financial executives shared a jackpot of $254.2 million ($364 million after inflation), the largest prize on a Connecticut-bought ticket. Choosing the cash option, the men split nearly $104 million after withholdings. The jackpot, at the time, was the 12th largest in Powerball history.

On May 18, 2013, the world's largest one-ticket jackpot at the time, an annuity of approximately $590.5 million ($816 million after inflation), was won by a Powerball ticket sold in Zephyrhills, Florida. On June 5, Florida Lottery officials announced the winner who purchased the "quick pick" ticket at a Publix supermarket. The winner chose the cash option of approximately $370.8 million, before Federal withholding; Florida does not have a state income tax.

On January 13, 2016, the world's largest lottery jackpot at the time, an annuity of approximately $1.586 billion was split among three Powerball tickets in Chino Hills, California, Melbourne Beach, Florida, and Munford, Tennessee, each worth $528.8 million. Since there is no income tax in Florida or Tennessee (and California does not tax lottery winnings), the cash option after Federal withholdings is $187.2 million each.

On August 23, 2017, the owner of a Powerball ticket sold in Chicopee, Massachusetts, won more than $750 million, one of the largest prizes in the lottery's history. A mother of two from Massachusetts was the winner.

On March 27, 2019, a single ticket purchased in Wisconsin was the only winner of a $768.4 million ($477 million cash) Powerball jackpot, the third largest in U.S. lottery history. The winner of the enormous prize was identified as a 24-year-old Wisconsin man.

On November 8, 2022, a single ticket purchased in Altadena, California, was the only winner of a $2.04 billion Powerball jackpot, the largest in U.S. lottery history. The prize was claimed on February 14, 2023. The winner was revealed as Edwin Castro. He opted to collect his prize as a lump sum payment of $997.6 million. He purchased his ticket at Joe's Service Center in Altadena, which received a $1 million reward from the Powerball operator for selling the winning ticket.

On July 19, 2023, a single ticket purchased in Los Angeles, California, was the only winner of a $1.08 billion ($558.1 million cash) Powerball jackpot.

On October 11, 2023, a single ticket purchased in Frazier Park, California, was the only winner of a $1.76 billion ($774.1 million cash) Powerball jackpot, the second-largest in U.S lottery history.

=== Fortune cookie payout ===
The Powerball drawing on March 30, 2005, produced 110 second-prize winners. The total payout to these winners was $19.4 million, with 89 winners receiving $100,000 each, while the other 21 winners received $500,000 each as they were Power Play selections.

MUSL officials initially suspected fraud or a reporting error. However, all 110 winners had played numbers from fortune cookies made by Wonton Food Inc. of Long Island City, New York. The factory had printed the numbers "22, 28, 32, 33, 39, 40" on thousands of fortunes. The "40" in the fortune did not match the Powerball number, 42. No employees of Wonton Food played those numbers. At the time, the closest game member was Connecticut. Because the ticket holders had won as result of a coincidence rather than foul play, the payouts were made.

Had the fortune cookie given 42 as the Powerball number, these winners would have shared the $25 million jackpot: each $227,272 annuity or $122,727 cash (before withholdings). The fortune on the cookie read: "All the preparation you've done will finally be paying off."

== Offshoots ==
In 2006, WMS Gaming released a range of slot machines under the Powerball brand name. In 2007, the Oregon Lottery released a Windows Sidebar gadget that displays the winning numbers for Powerball in real-time. The gadget also provides large jackpot announcements.

The New York Lottery introduced a Powerball scratchcard in 2010. Five winning numbers plus a Powerball were printed across the top of the card, with 12 opportunities to match. Matching the winning numbers or the Powerball won. The top prize was $1 million (annuity); unlike actual Powerball, there was no cash option for the top prize.

Powerball Xs & Os is a separate lottery game launched in September 2026 available in 23 of the 49 lotteries that offer Powerball and is officially licensed by the National Football League. Instead of picking numbers, a player picks the logos of 8 of the 32 NFL teams and is awarded prizes based on how many of the logos they match during the Sunday 10:00 p.m. drawing; the jackpot for matching all 8 logos starts at $1 million and is currently $2.35 million. Each ticket, which costs $5, can also be redeemed for points that can be entered into bonus drawings for NFL-themed prizes.

== See also ==
- Lottery jackpot records
