= Arkansas Scholarship Lottery =

- Key people: Sharon Strong, Executive Director; Jerry Fetzer, Chief Fiscal Officer; Karen Reynolds, Director of Advertising & Marketing; Mike Smith, Director of Gaming; Mark Hern, Director of Sales

The Arkansas Scholarship Lottery is run by the government of Arkansas.

== History ==
On November 4, 2008, Arkansas voters approved a ballot question legalizing the sale of lottery tickets there. The Arkansas Scholarship Lottery Act establishes a Commission to oversee the operation of the Lottery in Arkansas (see Arkansas Lottery Commission below). On July 1, 2009, Arkansas voted to join the Multi-State Lottery Association (MUSL); it was the 33rd lottery to join.

Ticket buyers must be at least 18, which is the usual minimum age for US lotteries, but lower than in neighboring Louisiana. Video lottery is prohibited. Arkansas started selling scratch off tickets on September 28, 2009. Powerball tickets went on sale on October 31, 2009. Mega Millions tickets went on sale in Arkansas on January 31, 2010.

Arkansas conducts its in-house draw games using a random number generator (RNG); it is believed to be the first US lottery to begin with computerized drawings. Balls and drawing machines are not used by the Lottery, although this "classic" drawing method is used in Arkansas' multi-jurisdictional games (Lucky for Life, Mega Millions, and Powerball.)

== Arkansas Lottery Commission ==
Subchapter 2 of the Arkansas Scholarship Lottery Act established the creation of the Arkansas Lottery Commission. The subchapter established the Commission or Lottery as a self-supporting and revenue-raising agency of the state. The commission had 9 members by law, of whom three were appointed by the Governor, three by the Speaker of the state House of Representatives, and three by the President Pro Tempore of the state Senate. After the initial appointment of commissioners, the normal term of each commissioner was six years. Commissioners were limited to no more than two terms of six years and General Assembly members or anyone in their immediate family were prohibited from serving as commissioners.

In the 2015 legislative session of the General Assembly, the Arkansas Lottery Commission was abolished. Act 218 of 2015 dissolved the 9 member commission and placed lottery operations under the purview of the Department of Finance and Administration.

== Draw games timeline ==
- October 31, 2009 - Powerball tickets went on sale
- November 4, 2009 - First Powerball drawing including Arkansas was held
- December 14, 2009 - Cash 3 tickets went on sale
- January 2, 2010 - Arkansas's first Powerball jackpot winner
- January 31, 2010 - Mega Millions tickets went on sale
- February 2, 2010 - First Mega Millions drawing including Arkansas was held
- July 12, 2010 - Cash 4 tickets went on sale
- July 14, 2010 - Million Dollar Raffle tickets became available.
- May 2011 - Arkansas joins Decades of Dollars, which began in January 2011 in Georgia, Kentucky, and Virginia.

== Draw games ==
=== In-house draw games ===
==== Cash 3 ====
Cash 3 is a game that has 13 drawings weekly (twice daily except Sundays). It began on December 14, 2009. Prices, prizes, and options vary.

==== Cash 4 ====
Cash 4 was originally to begin in February 2010, but was delayed until July 2010. It also has 13 weekly drawings. Prices, prizes, and options will vary; the maximum prize is $5,000 on a $1 play.

==== Natural State Jackpot ====
This game was introduced on August 27, 2012. Players need to pick a set of 5 numbers from 1 to 39 for each $1 game played. Five numbers are drawn at random from a field of primary numbers ranging from 1 to 39 for each drawing. Players need to match all five numbers in any order with the numbers selected on their Natural State Jackpot tickets to win the jackpot which starts at $50,000 cash and rolls over by $5,000 until it reaches $100,000 after which it rolls over by $10,000 until it’s won (usually the jackpot for this game is won when it’s within the $200,000 to $225,000 range). Players can also win by matching 2, 3, or 4 numbers in any order out of the 5 selected. Drawings are held every day.

==== Lotto ====
This game began on September 18, 2022, with drawings held every Wednesday and Saturday starting on September 21, 2022. The game is played by picking 6 numbers from a field of primary numbers ranging from 1 to 40 for each $2 game played. The Arkansas Lottery draws 6 winning Lotto numbers and 1 bonus number from that field of numbers ranging from 1 to 40. Players have to match the first 6 numbers drawn in any order with the numbers on their Lotto tickets to win the jackpot which starts at $250,000. The 7th number is the bonus number and can be used with 3, 4, or 5 of the winning numbers drawn to increase prizes won for matching 3, 4, or 5 numbers without the bonus number. Players can also win by matching 2 numbers and the bonus number.

=== Multi-jurisdiction draw games ===
==== Lucky for Life ====
Lucky for Life began as a Connecticut-only game, Lucky-4-Life, in 2009. Eventually it added five lotteries and became a regional game under the current name. The current version began on January 27, 2015; as of April 2017 it is available in 22 states plus the District of Columbia.

Lucky for Life's two highest prize tiers ($1000-per-day and $25,000-per-year) are "lifetime" prizes; winners of either tier can choose cash instead. The drawings remain in Connecticut; winning numbers are chosen using two drawing machines with numbered balls.

==== Mega Millions ====
In 2010, lotteries then with either Mega Millions or Powerball could begin offering both. The current version of Mega Millions began in 2013. Drawings are held in Atlanta using a similar draw method as in Lucky for Life.

=== Former multi-state games ===
==== Decades of Dollars ====
Decades of Dollars began in 2011 in three states, with Arkansas joining a few months later. DoD became a Virginia-only game when Arkansas, Georgia, and Kentucky participated in the launch of Monopoly Millionaires′ Club (see below.)

==== Monopoly Millionaires′ Club ====
Monopoly Millionaires′ Club began in October 2014 in 22 states and the District of Columbia; however, poor sales largely due to player confusion led to the game suspending sales after only 10 draws of the Friday-only game.

In 2015 MMC was resurrected as a series (one in each jurisdiction) of scratch games. A television game show featuring Monopoly Millionaires′ Club aired beginning March 28, 2015.

== Play It Again ==
Every Arkansas Scholarship Lottery instant game qualifies for entry into a "Play It Again" drawing. When the game is over, the top cash prize winner will be selected randomly from all qualifying entries for that game.

Some player-favorite games like Jumbo Bucks may always be available to play. Periodically, there will be second chance drawings scheduled to award the top prize from those games.
