= Arizona Lottery =

State agency

- Region: Arizona
- Regulated by: Multi-State Lottery Association
- Website: https://www.arizonalottery.com/

The Arizona Lottery is a state agency of Arizona in the southwest United States. It is a member of the Multi-State Lottery Association (MUSL). Lottery draw games include Mega Millions, Powerball, The Pick, Triple Twist, Fantasy 5, Pick 3, and Pick 4. A variety of instant scratch tickets, or Scratchers, are also offered.

The Arizona Lottery's mission statement is to support Arizona programs for the public benefit by maximizing revenue in a responsible manner. Arizona became the first state west of the Mississippi River to approve a lottery when the statewide public initiative (Proposition 200) narrowly passed in November 1980. In 2002, a vote to extend the lottery for another ten years was passed, with 73% in favor. In 2010, the Lottery was extended into 2035.

The first sale from the Arizona Lottery was 45 years ago on July 1, 1981; the product was an instant scratch ticket called Scratch It Rich.

Proceeds from sales of Arizona Lottery tickets, nearly $4 million weekly, fund a variety of state programs. In fiscal year 2016, the Arizona Lottery transferred over $205 million to these programs. The Lottery transfers money to 12 funds that serve 18 beneficiaries. There are six core Arizona Lottery pillars that these 18 beneficiaries align with: arts and education; community enrichment; economic development; environmental conservation; health and human services; and public safety.

Arizona requires lottery players to be at least 21 years of age; the minimum age was 18 until June 1, 2003.

== Current draw games ==
=== In-hose draw games ===
==== Pick 3 ====
Pick 3 is drawn twice daily. It draws three digits 0 through 9. The prize for an exact match (Straight) is $250 on a 50-cent wager, or $500 on a $1 wager.

==== Pick 4 ====
Pick 4 is drawn twice daily, with its first drawing held on June 14, 2026. It is the four-digit variant of Pick 3. The prize for an exact match (Straight) is $2,500 on a 50-cent wager, or $5,000 on a $1 wager.

==== Fantasy 5 ====
Fantasy 5 is also drawn daily. It draws 5 of 41 numbers. Its minimum jackpot is $50,000, increasing until there is a 5-of-5 winner. Games are $1. Fantasy 5 has an add-on game, EXTRA!.

==== Triple Twist ====
Triple Twist is an in-state jackpot game, with the first drawing held on December 17, 2018. Each play costs $2 for three rows (two of the three rows are quick pick). Jackpots start at $200,000. The largest jackpot ever claimed was $1.9 million back on May 22, 2019, located in Tucson. The draw type is 6 from 42 numbers.

==== The Pick ====
The Pick is an in-state jackpot game; its first drawing was October 13, 1984. Its largest jackpot was $14.6 million on June 5, 2019. The Pick is drawn Mondays, Wednesdays and Saturdays at 8:00 PM MST. Plays are $1. Jackpots begin at $1 million. The Pick draws 6 of 44 numbers (previously 39, with a "Bonus Number").

=== Multi-jurisdictional games ===
==== Powerball ====
Arizona participated in its first Powerball drawing on April 3, 1994, when the lottery became a member of MUSL. Since then, 12 jackpot winners have won in Arizona. Powerball is drawn Mondays, Wednesdays, and Saturdays. Each play is $2 ($3 with Power Play) Starting jackpot is $20 million (annuitized with cash option.)

==== Mega Millions ====
First Mega Millions Drawing for Arizona: April 8, 2010

The Arizona Lottery began selling Mega Millions tickets in April 2010. The state is waiting for its first Mega Millions jackpot winner. However, 6 lucky players have won second place prizes of $1 million or more during the past six years.

On October 13, 2009, the Mega Millions consortium and MUSL reached an agreement in principle to cross-sell Mega Millions and Powerball in US lottery jurisdictions. Most lotteries with either game began selling tickets for both on January 31, 2010. Arizona joined Mega Millions on April 18, 2010. For an extra $1 the winnings may be multiplied by up to 5 with the Megaplier option.

On November 1, 2017, Mega Millions became a two dollar play.

=== The Trio ===
On November 1, 2017, Mega Millions increased from $1 to $2 and the Trio became $5. The Trio consists of one Powerball ticket, one Mega Millions ticket, and one The Pick ticket. Powerball and Mega Millions (national games) are both $2 per play, while The Pick (an Arizona-only game) is $2 per play.

== Scratchers ==
First Scratchers Ticket: Scratch it Rich

The first Arizona Lottery ticket was a Scratchers ticket called Scratch it Rich. The game launched on July 1, 1981. Since then, the Arizona Lottery has sold nearly 1,000 different versions of its Scratchers tickets.

The state's longest running, most popular Scratchers tickets include:

Game	Original Launch	Consecutive Years; Available	Price; Point	Average Number of Tickets; Sold Each Year
Crossword	January 25, 1999	17 years	$2	16.6 million
Red Hot 7's	June 7, 1999	17 years	$2	3.5 million
Bingo	November 27, 1995	21 years	$2	11 million

Unusual Scratchers Ticket Prizes

Arizona Lottery winners have received more than just cash prizes in the past 35 years. Some of the most unusual Scratchers prizes have included hot air balloon rides, a Caribbean cruise, a Las Vegas game show experience, a Phoenix Suns travel package, a trip to Caesar's Palace, a seat in the 2011 World Series of Poker Main Event and a contestant spot on an episode of Wheel of Fortune featuring lottery winners exclusively.

== See also ==
- Lottery wheeling
- Structured settlement
