= Puerto Rico Lottery =

Operated by the Puerto Rico Department of Treasury

- Former logo
- Region: Puerto Rico
- First draw: 1934
- Operator: Puerto Rico Department of Treasury
- Regulated by: Puerto Rico Department of Treasury
- Number of games: Lotería Tradicional, Loto Cash (with Multiplicador), Revancha X2, Pega 2, Pega 3, Pega 4, Powerball; Mega Millions - Soon 2026
- Website: loteriasdepuertorico.pr.gov (in Spanish)

The Puerto Rico Lottery (Lotería de Puerto Rico) was first authorized in 1814 by the King of Spain and was put into law in 1934. It is operated by the Puerto Rico Department of Treasury.

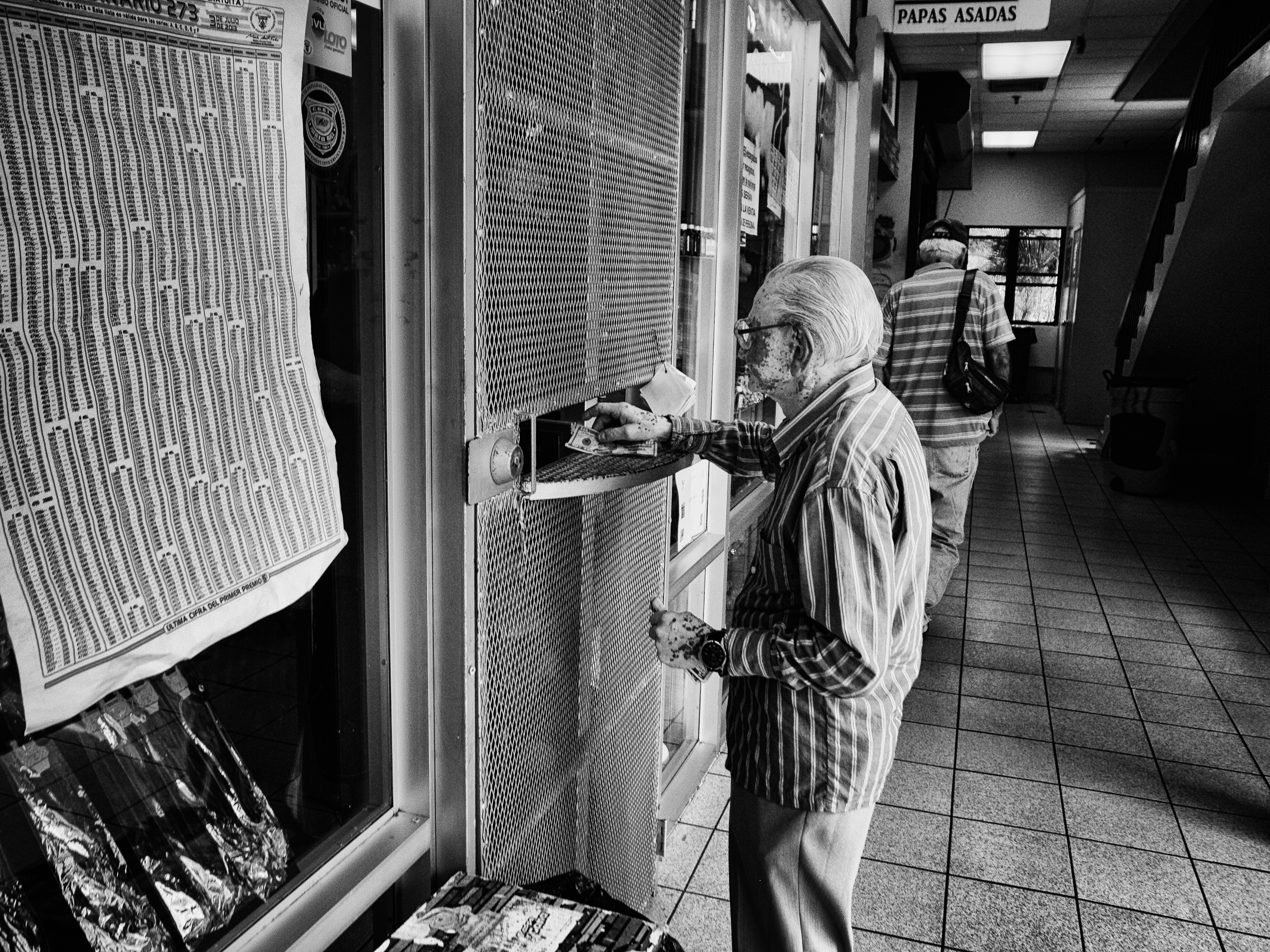
Man buying lottery in Puerto Rico

== History ==
The first Puerto Rico Lottery drawing was held on September 1, 1814 in the public plaza of San Juan. The lottery then was not very popular and it and other similar lotteries begun in Mayagüez and Ponce had for the most part died down. However, clandestine lotteries continued until an official lottery began again on May 31, 1934. This was spearheaded by the government of Puerto Rico and included 54 yearly prizes. It was restarted to stop clandestine lotteries which were quite popular among the Puerto Rican people and to raise funds for community projects. A Puerto Rican athlete headed to the Olympics could be supported by lottery winnings. In 1942, advertisements for the Puerto Rico Lottery published in the “Radio Album” asked people to buy the lottery because earnings would be used to address the tuberculosis epidemic on the island.

On May 15, 1947, as a result of Law 465 the lottery received $250,000 funding.

In its beginnings, tickets were sold by lottery ticket vendors who spent the day walking up and down the streets, with tickets in hand. Other vendors displayed the lottery tickets for sale, at their shop entrances. Local tales abounded about who won or almost won the lottery.

Puerto Rico's lottery includes daily Pega 2, Pega 3, and Pega 4 (“Pick 2”, “Pick 3”, and “Pick 4”) games, weekly regular lottery draws on Wednesdays (50 times annually), and two special draws, each prior to Mother's Day and Christmas. The lottery also offers instant scratch-off games, which were introduced in 2010. The lottery uses equipment for the sale of electronic lottery tickets from Scientific Games Corporation.

In 2014, the lottery was losing millions of dollars with more money being paid out than was being received (through ticket sales). The aberration was investigated by a consultant who found evidence, which he passed on to the Federal Bureau of Investigation. A drug and gun-running cartel was stealing the money from the lottery in order to launder their money.

== Other lotteries ==
The Puerto Rico Lottery participates in the Multi-State Lottery Association's Powerball lottery draws since September 28, 2014; they were the last state lottery in the United States to participate in the national draw.

Mega Millions, available in all other U.S. states with a lottery, is soon offered in Puerto Rico on 2026 and there are plans for the lottery to offer it on 2nd trimester of 2026.
