= Virgin Islands Lottery (US) =

A lottery exists within the United States Virgin Islands, the only US lottery outside the mainland and Puerto Rico. It was established in 1937 and became an independent agency of the territorial government in 1971. The USVI is a member of the Multi-State Lottery Association (MUSL). It is the smallest US lottery to offer either Powerball, Mega Millions or scratchcard games. The USVI Lottery is also a member of the Caribbean Lottery, in which other islands, such as Sint Maarten, Saint Kitts and Nevis, and Barbados, participate. Minimum age to play the Virgin Islands Lottery is 18.

The lottery headquarters is in Charlotte Amalie on St. Thomas.
