= Mega Millions =

American multi-jurisdictional lottery game

- Region: United States
- First draw: August 31, 1996
- Operator: Mega Millions Group
- Highest jackpot: $1.602 billion
- Odds of winning jackpot: 290,472,336 to 1
- Website: www.megamillions.com

Mega Millions
- Established: May 15, 2002 (as Mega Millions); August 31, 1996 (as The Big Game)
- Defunct: May 14, 2002 (as The Big Game)
- Type: Lottery drawing
- Headquarters: WSB-TV/Georgia Lottery (drawing); Mega Millions Group (administration)

Mega Millions
- Genre: Lottery Drawing
- Presented by: Glenn Burns; Carol Blackmon; Sabrina Gibbons-Cupit; John Crow; Adria Wofford
- Country of origin: United States
- Original language: English
- No. of seasons: 29

Production
- Production locations: Georgia Lottery Headquarters; Atlanta, Georgia
- Running time: 1 Minute
- Production company: Georgia Lottery

Original release
- Network: Syndicated to WSB-TV, WGN-TV, & WABC-TV among others

Mega Millions (originally known as The Big Game in 1996 and renamed, temporarily, to The Big Game Mega Millions six years later) is an American multijurisdictional lottery game. The first drawing took place on September 6, 1996, with six participating states, Georgia, Illinois, Maryland, Michigan, Massachusetts, and Virginia. After growth of the game in 1997, a Tuesday Drawing was added in February 1998. As of June 30, 2023, it is offered in 45 states, the District of Columbia, and the U.S. Virgin Islands. The first (The Big Game) Mega Millions drawing was in 2002. The logo for all versions of the game following the retirement of The Big Game name featured a gold-colored ball with six stars to represent the game's initial membership, although some lotteries insert their respective logos to replace said stars.

Mega Millions is drawn at 11:00 p.m. Eastern Time on Tuesday and Friday evenings, including holidays. It is administered by a consortium of its 12 original lotteries, the drawings are held at the studios of WSB-TV in Atlanta, Georgia, supervised by the Georgia Lottery. The hosts are Carol Blackmon, John Crow, and Adria Wofford.

Under the existing version's regulations (which began April 5, 2025, with the first drawing planned for April 8) for Mega Millions, the minimum Mega Millions advertised jackpot is $50 million, paid in 30 graduated yearly installments, increasing 5% each year (unless the cash option is chosen). The jackpot increases when no top-prize winner results, with a minimum guaranteed increase per unwon draw of $10 million.

Reflecting common practice among American lotteries, the jackpot is advertised as a nominal value of annual installments. A cash-value option (the usual choice), when chosen by a jackpot winner, pays the approximate present value of the installments. Mega Millions' previous format began on October 28, 2017; its first drawing was three days later. In the existing version of Mega Millions, five white balls are drawn from a pool of 70, and one gold-colored "Mega Ball" is drawn from a separate pool of 24; a player must match all six numbers to win the jackpot.

Each game costs $5 (previously $2). Each game includes a multiplier formerly known as the "Megaplier" until 2025, now a regular 'multiplier', where the base non-jackpot prize is multiplied by 2, 3, 4, 5 or 10. The Megaplier was made available to all Mega Millions jurisdictions in January 2011 as an add-on which cost an extra $1 per play; it began as an option available only in Texas in 2003. Several of the game's members offered an only-the-jackpot option that was called "Just the Jackpot", in which two plays cost $3. None of the lower-tier prizes are in play on such a wager.

== The 2010 expansion of Mega Millions and Powerball ==
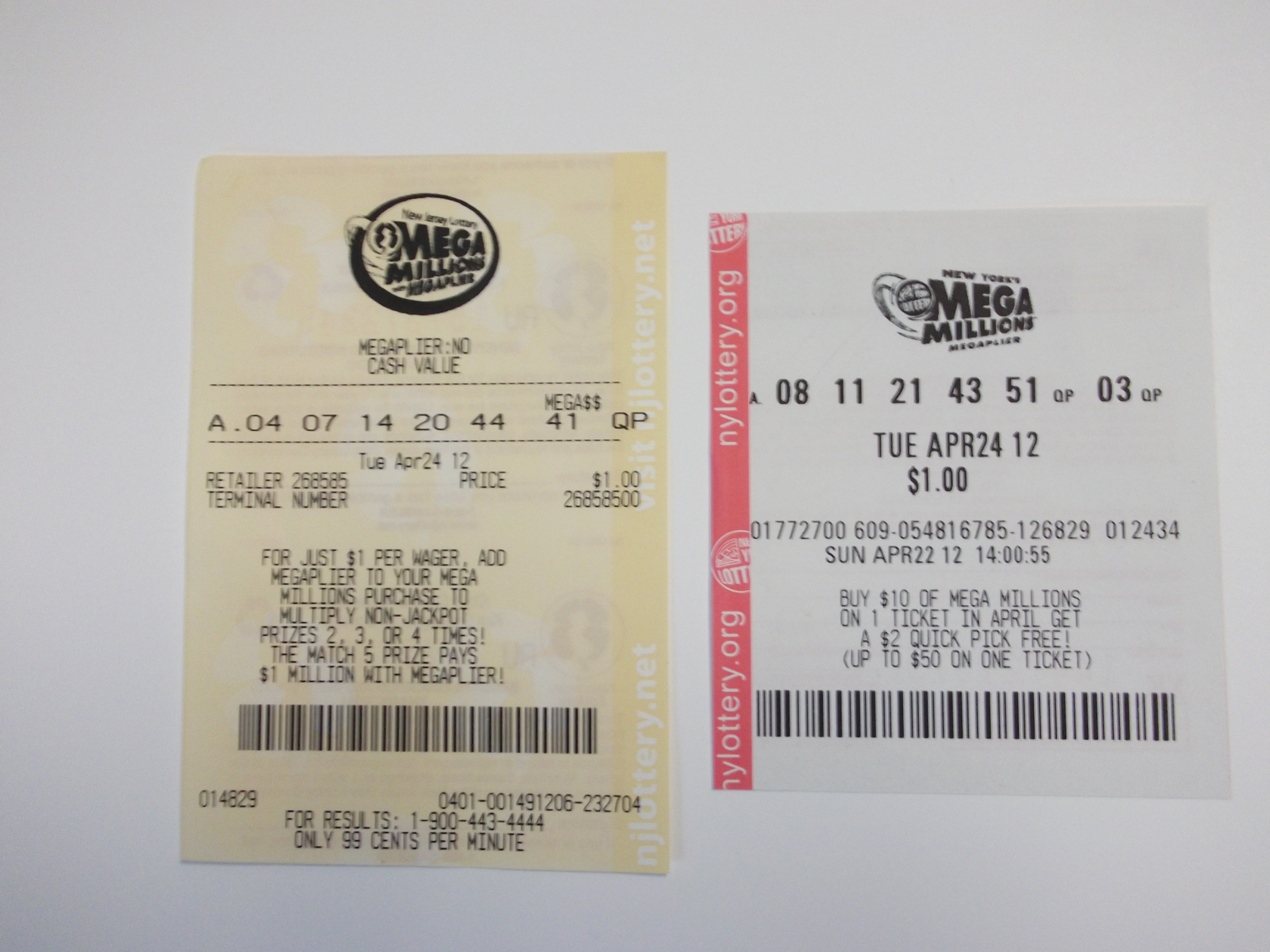
Mega Millions lottery tickets from New Jersey (left) and New York (right): See below for rule variations among the game's members, including which lotteries offer the Just the Jackpot option

On October 13, 2009, the Mega Millions consortium and Multi-State Lottery Association (MUSL) reached an agreement in principle to cross-sell Mega Millions and Powerball in American lottery jurisdictions, with the two groups referred to as the "Mega Power Lottery" by many users. The expansion occurred on January 31, 2010, as 23 Powerball members began selling Mega Millions tickets for their first drawing on February 2, 2010; likewise, 10 Mega Millions members began selling Powerball tickets for their first drawing the next day. Montana (joining Mega Millions on March 1, 2010) was the first jurisdiction to add either game after the cross-sell expansion. Nebraska (March 20, 2010), Oregon (March 28, 2010), Arizona (April 18, 2010), Maine (May 9, 2010), Colorado, and South Dakota (the latter two on May 16, 2010) also have joined Mega Millions since the expansion.

As of January 2020, 47 lotteries were offering Mega Millions and Powerball, Florida joined Mega Millions in May 2013. (Puerto Rico, whose lottery began in the 1930s, does not offer Mega Millions.) Mississippi began selling lottery tickets in 2019, it joined Mega Millions on January 30, 2020.

Before the agreement, the only stores that sold Mega Millions and Powerball tickets were retailers whose businesses were on a border between jurisdictions and sold competing games.

The existing Mega Millions format began in April 2025. Plays are $5 per game. Each game has an attached, randomly-generated value known as the 'multiplier', which multiplies non-jackpot prizes. Multipliers are 2, 3, 4, 5 and 10 (a second-prize 10x multiplier play can win $10 million cash).

== Active Mega Millions members ==
Map of U.S. states and territories offering Mega Millions, as of November 2022

=== Mega Millions and Powerball ===
Lottery	Powerball	Mega Millions
Arizona	April 4, 1994	April 18, 2010
Arkansas	October 31, 2009	January 31, 2010
California	April 8, 2013	June 22, 2005
Connecticut	November 28, 1995	January 31, 2010
Colorado	August 2, 2001	May 16, 2010
Delaware	January 14, 1991	January 31, 2010
District of Columbia	February 13, 1988	January 31, 2010
Florida	January 4, 2009	May 15, 2013
Georgia (flagship lottery)	January 31, 2010	September 6, 1996
Idaho	February 1, 1990	January 31, 2010
Illinois	January 31, 2010	September 6, 1996
Indiana	October 14, 1990	January 31, 2010
Iowa	February 13, 1988	January 31, 2010
Kansas	February 13, 1988	January 31, 2010
Kentucky	January 10, 1991	January 31, 2010
Louisiana	March 5, 1995	November 16, 2011
Maine	July 30, 2004	May 9, 2010
Maryland	January 31, 2010	September 6, 1996
Massachusetts	January 31, 2010	September 6, 1996
Michigan	January 31, 2010	September 6, 1996
Minnesota	August 14, 1990	January 31, 2010
Mississippi	January 30, 2020	January 30, 2020
Missouri	February 13, 1988	January 31, 2010
Montana	November 9, 1989	March 1, 2010
Nebraska	July 21, 1994	March 20, 2010
New Hampshire	November 5, 1995	January 31, 2010
New Jersey	January 31, 2010	May 26, 1999
New Mexico	October 20, 1996	January 31, 2010
New York	January 31, 2010	May 17, 2002
North Carolina	May 30, 2006	January 31, 2010
North Dakota	March 25, 2004	January 31, 2010
Ohio	April 16, 2010	May 17, 2002
Oklahoma	January 12, 2006	January 31, 2010
Oregon	February 13, 1988	March 28, 2010
Pennsylvania	June 29, 2002	January 31, 2010
Puerto Rico	September 28, 2014	Not offered
Rhode Island	February 13, 1988	January 31, 2010
South Carolina	October 6, 2002	January 31, 2010
South Dakota	November 15, 1990	May 16, 2010
Tennessee	April 21, 2004	January 31, 2010
Texas	January 31, 2010	December 5, 2003
US Virgin Islands	November 14, 2010	October 4, 2010
Vermont	July 1, 2003	January 31, 2010
Virginia	January 31, 2010	September 6, 1996
Washington	January 31, 2010	September 4, 2002
West Virginia	February 13, 1988	January 31, 2010
Wisconsin	August 10, 1989	January 31, 2010
Wyoming	August 24, 2014	August 24, 2014

Alabama, Alaska, Hawaii, Nevada, and Utah do not sell lottery tickets. In 2013, Wyoming became the 44th state to establish a lottery, the next year, it began, initially offering both Mega Millions and Powerball. In August 2018, a bill establishing a lottery in Mississippi was passed, and sent to its governor for his signature, its lottery began November 25, 2019, with Mississippi joining Mega Millions on January 30, 2020.

In most cases, a lottery joining Mega Millions on or after January 31, 2010, offered Powerball before the MUSL cross-sell expansion.

== History ==
=== The Big Game ===
The Big Game logo prior to the Mega Millions name change

Tickets for The Big Game began to be sold in Georgia, Illinois, Maryland, Massachusetts, Michigan, and Virginia on August 31, 1996. The Big Game was created and designed by Michigan Lottery Commissioner Bill Martin and Illinois Lottery Director Desiree Rogers after having discussions regarding a multistate game with lottery directors Rebecca Paul of the Georgia Lottery and Penelope W. Kyle of the Virginia Lottery. The Big Game initially was drawn weekly, on Friday.

The Georgia Lottery was a member of MUSL at the time and wanted to sell both games for the remainder of 1996, but within a few days, Georgia was forcibly removed from MUSL, returning with the 2010 cross-selling expansion.

Beginning in January 1999, jackpot winners were given the option to receive their prize in cash. In May 1999, New Jersey joined The Big Game, the only jurisdiction to enter as a participant before The Big Game became Mega Millions in 2002.

=== The Big Game Mega Millions ===
The Big Game Mega Millions logo following the addition of the name Mega Millions

Ohio and New York joined The Big Game consortium on May 15, 2002, when the game was renamed The Big Game Mega Millions, temporarily retaining the old name and the original "gold ball" logo. The "Big Money Ball" became the "Mega Ball". While the game's name was altered, the yellow ball in the new Mega Millions logo continued to read "The Big Game" until February 2003, after which it was replaced with six stars representing the original members of the consortium. The first (The Big Game) Mega Millions drawing was held two days later, on May 17. The Mega Millions trademark is owned by the Illinois Lottery. The first three lotteries to join Mega Millions were Washington (in September 2002), Texas (in 2003), and California (in 2005), California was the last addition to Mega Millions before the cross-sell expansion of 2010. Montana joined Mega Millions on March 1, 2010, the first addition to Mega Millions after the cross-sell expansion.

When Texas joined Mega Millions in 2003, it began offering an option, initially available only to Texas Lottery players, known as the Megaplier, which was similar to Powerball's Power Play. The 11 Mega Millions lotteries without Megaplier on the January 31, 2010, cross-selling date gradually added the multiplier option, by January 2011, all Mega Millions lotteries, except for California, offered the Megaplier. The Texas Lottery owns the trademark to Megaplier.

On June 24, 2005, to commemorate California joining Mega Millions, that night's drawing was held in Hollywood, with Carrie Underwood assisting host Glenn Burns for the draw.

For the November 15, 2005, drawing, a group called "The Lucky 7" held the only jackpot-winning ticket, purchased in Anaheim, California, winning $315 million. They chose the cash option, splitting $175 million before tax was withheld.

On March 6, 2007, the Mega Millions jackpot reached $390 million, which was then the third-largest jackpot in U.S. history. The jackpot was shared by two tickets, both matching the numbers of 16–22–29–39–42 and Mega Ball 20. Both winners chose the cash option, with each share $116,557,083 before tax was withheld.

=== 2010 cross-sell expansion ===
The New Jersey Lottery, among others, in early 2009 announced it would seek permission to sell Powerball tickets alongside Mega Millions. In October 2009, an agreement between Mega Millions and MUSL allowed all U.S. lotteries, including New Jersey's, to offer both games. On January 31, 2010, Mega Millions expanded to include the 23 MUSL members; as of that date, 35 jurisdictions were participating in Mega Millions. On the same day, 10 existing Mega Millions-participating lotteries began selling Powerball tickets. Ohio joined Powerball on April 16, 2010. On March 1, 2010, Montana became the first MUSL member to add Mega Millions after the cross-sell expansion. Nebraska became the 37th Mega Millions participating member on March 20, 2010, followed by Oregon as the 38th member on March 28, Arizona as the 39th member on April 18, and Maine as 40th Mega Millions participant on May 9, 2010. Colorado and South Dakota added Mega Millions on May 16, 2010, bringing the total to 42 jurisdictions.

Recent additions to Mega Millions included the U.S. Virgin Islands, in October 2010, and Louisiana in November 2011. Florida joined Mega Millions on May 15, 2013, the first drawing to include Florida-bought tickets was two days later.

Presumably due to their experience with the Power Play option for Powerball, all 23 lotteries joining Mega Millions on January 31, 2010, immediately offered Megaplier to their players. The Megaplier continues to be drawn by Texas Lottery computers, as California does not offer the multiplier. Montana, offering Powerball before the expansion date, became the 24th lottery to offer the Megaplier, followed by Nebraska (the 25th), Oregon (the 26th), Arizona (as the 27th) and Maine (as the 28th lottery to offer the option). After Colorado and South Dakota joined Mega Millions, the number of lotteries offering the Megaplier rose to 37.

Mega Millions tickets bought with the Megaplier option, beginning September 12, 2010, automatically won $1 million (instead of $250,000) if the five white balls – but excluding the Mega Ball – are matched.

On March 13, 2010, New Jersey became the first Mega Millions participant (just before the cross-sell expansion) to produce a jackpot-winning ticket for Powerball after joining that game. The ticket was worth over $211 million annuity (the cash option was chosen). On May 28, 2010, North Carolina became the first Powerball member (just before the cross-selling expansion) to produce a jackpot-winning Mega Millions ticket after joining Mega Millions, with an annuity jackpot of $12 million.

In January 2012, Mega Millions' rival Powerball was altered, among the changes were a price increase of $1 for each play; as a result, a base game costs $2, or $3 with the Power Play option. The price of a Mega Millions play stayed the same until 2017. The price increase for playing Powerball was a major factor in Louisiana deciding to pursue joining Mega Millions, as that state's lottery joined Mega Millions on November 16, 2011.

=== October 2013 format change ===
The final 5/56 + 1/46 Mega Millions drawing was held on October 18, 2013; that night's jackpot of $37 million was not won. The first drawing under the revised 5/75 + 1/15 format—which saw the jackpot estimate "leap" to $55 million due to the change in the annuity structure—occurred on October 22, 2013. The minimum jackpot was then $15 million, with rollovers of at least $5 million. Second prize (5+0) became $1 million cash. In the revised format, players chose 5 of 75 white ball numbers, and the "Gold Ball" number out of 15.

The Megaplier option remained, the 5 multiplier was added.

Lower prize tiers (through October 18, 2013) based on a $1 play:

- Match 5+0: $250,000
- Match 4+MB: $10,000
- Match 4+0: $150
- Match 3+MB: $150
- Match 3+0: $7
- Match 2+MB: $10
- Match 1+MB: $3
- Match 0+MB: $2

Payouts in California remained parimutuel.

The odds of winning or sharing a Mega Millions jackpot (October 19, 2013 – October 27, 2017): one in about 258.9 million. The overall odds of winning a prize were one in 14.71, including the base $1 prize for a "Mega Ball"-only match.

Prizes and odds (2013–2017 version) based on a $1 play:

- 5 numbers plus the Mega Ball (5+1): Jackpot; 1 in 258,890,850
- 5 numbers but not the Mega Ball (5+0): $1,000,000; 1 in 17,259,390
- 4+1: $5,000; 1 in 739,688
- 4+0: $500; 1 in 52,835
- 3+1: $50; 1 in 10,720
- 3+0: $5; 1 in 766
- 2+1: $5; 1 in 473
- 1+1: $2; 1 in 56
- Mega Ball only: $1; 1 in 21

The odds for winning the $1 prize, 1 in 21, reflected the possibility of matching none of the white balls, but matching the Mega Ball.

The annuity—which was 20 annual payments (no cash option was available) when The Big Game began—changed from 26 equal yearly installments to 30 graduated annual payments (increasing 5 percent yearly) with the format change on October 19, 2013.

=== October 2017 format/price point change ===
On October 28, 2017, the price of a Mega Millions play doubled, to $2, the first drawing under that price point was October 31, 2017. The Mega Millions double matrix changed, from 5/75 + 1/15 to the existing 5/70 + 1/25. The starting jackpot became $40 million, with minimum rollovers of $5 million. The "Megaplier" option (which again is not offered in California) was retained, with an adjustment to its multipliers. (The final jackpot for the $1 version was $30 million, which was not won, the initial jackpot for the new version would still be $40 million with a jackpot hit.)

Mega Millions' non-California prize tiers effective October 28, 2017 (old prizes in parentheses, changed amounts in boldface) for a $2 base play:

- 5+MB: Jackpot; **starting jackpot raised to $40 million (annuity value)**
- 5+0: $1,000,000 ($1,000,000)
- 4+MB: **$10,000** ($5,000)
- 4+0: $500 ($500)
- 3+MB: **$200** ($50)
- 3+0: **$10** ($5)
- 2+MB: **$10** ($5)
- 1+MB: **$4** ($2)
- 0+MB: **$2** ($1)

The new prize structure allocates roughly 75 percent of the prize pool for the jackpot, this is, in part, to facilitate the new Just the Jackpot option. The 2013–2017 version allocated about 68 percent towards the jackpot.

=== "Just the Jackpot" option ===
Alongside the 2017 format change, the then-46 Mega Millions members were given the choice of offering a "Just the Jackpot" option. As the name would suggest, a player choosing this option is not eligible for any of the eight lower-tier prizes. The option cost $3 for two plays, a $1 discount from two full plays.

The option was initially offered by the Georgia, Massachusetts, Nebraska, Ohio, South Dakota, and Texas lotteries, with it later expanding to the Indiana, Kansas, Kentucky, New Jersey, New Mexico, New York, Virginia, Wisconsin, and Wyoming lotteries. Most states required that "Just the Jackpot" wagers be terminal-generated, though Kansas and Texas allowed players to select their own numbers.

"Just the Jackpot" was removed in the 2025 format change. Throughout its lifespan, no Mega Millions jackpot was ever won by a "Just the Jackpot" ticket.

=== 2020 adjustments to jackpot starting point and rollover due to COVID-19 ===
On April 7, 2020, the Mega Millions starting jackpot amount was temporarily reset from $40 million to $20 million with the annuity option, with at least a $2 million rollover for each drawing without a jackpot winner, due to the COVID-19 pandemic in the United States. This was done to enforce social distancing and discourage crowding of selling venues for large jackpots, and to account for lower interest rates.

=== April 2025 format/price point change ===
On October 7, 2024, Mega Millions announced a new format that took effect on April 5, 2025, in time for the April 8, 2025 drawing. Plays then cost $5 each, with the Megaplier included in that cost, built into each play, and renamed a "multiplier". The multiplier had all of the older Megaplier numbers: 2, 3, 4, and 5, while introducing a 10x multiplier that could increase the maximum second-prize win to $10 million. The starting jackpot also increased from $20 million to $50 million, the minimum guaranteed increase quintupled from $2 million to $10 million, and the matrix features one less Mega Ball.

== Record jackpots ==
Over time, the size of jackpots has increased because of the higher ticket price, the larger number of states participating, and the reduced odds of winning.

Mega Millions' largest jackpot of $1.602 billion was won on August 8, 2023, in Neptune Beach, Florida. The jackpot ticket was sold at Publix, and the winner chose the cash option of $794.2 million.

The second-largest Mega Millions jackpot, $1.537 billion, was won on October 23, 2018, by one ticket, sold in South Carolina. The jackpot was claimed on March 5, 2019, with the winner choosing to remain anonymous under South Carolina law.

The third-largest Mega Millions jackpot worth $1.35 billion was won following the January 13, 2023, drawing, in which one winning ticket was sold in Maine. Notably, this was the first jackpot ticket sold in the state.

The fourth-largest Mega Millions jackpot worth $1.34 billion was won following the July 29, 2022, drawing, in which one winning ticket was sold in Illinois.

The fifth-largest Mega Millions jackpot worth $1.22 billion was won following the December 27, 2024 drawing. The winning ticket was sold in Cottonwood, California. A total of five others won the secondary prize. Two tickets were sold in California, one in Arizona, one in Texas, and one in Missouri.

The sixth-largest Mega Millions jackpot worth $1.13 billion was won following the March 26, 2024, drawing, in which one winning ticket was sold in New Jersey.

The seventh-largest Mega Millions jackpot advertised as $640 million at the time of the drawing (annuitized) or $462 million (cash value), was drawn on March 30, 2012. The initial estimate for that drawing (following the March 27 drawing, which was $363 million annuity) was $476 million (later increased to $500 million and again to $540 million); brisk ticket sales pushed the jackpot values, both annuitized (to $656 million) and the cash option ($474 million) higher. The amount spent on Mega Millions for drawings following its previous jackpot win, on January 24, 2012, was at least $1.5 billion. Three jackpot-winning tickets had been confirmed (Illinois, Kansas, and Maryland).

Mega Millions' eighth-largest jackpot, $648 million (second-largest won), was for the December 17, 2013, drawing. Two winning tickets, one each from California and Georgia, were sold. The holder of the Georgia ticket claimed the next morning; they selected the cash option, which amounted to $173,819,742.50 before withholdings. The holder of the California ticket claimed the prize on January 3, 2014. (The California ticket holder received an equal share, but potentially a larger cash-option amount, as California lottery winnings are exempt from state income tax.)

The July 24, 2018, drawing produced the ninth-largest jackpot (pending the larger one on offer the following October). The annuity value was $543 million, but the holders of the winning ticket, 11 co-workers at a Wells Fargo branch in San Jose, chose to split the $320 million cash lump sum.

Mega Millions' tenth-largest jackpot, $540 million, was for the July 8, 2016, drawing. One ticket from Indiana won the jackpot; the winner chose the cash option.

Mega Millions' eleventh-largest jackpot, $533 million, was for the March 30, 2018, drawing. One ticket from New Jersey won the jackpot; Riverdale Lukoil South Gas Station sold the winning ticket.

== Versions of (The Big Game) Mega Millions ==
Versions of The Big Game and Mega Millions have used different matrices:

Starting Date	Pick 5 White Balls From Field of	Pick 1 Gold (Mega) Ball From Field of	Jackpot odds
September 6, 1996	50	25	1: 52,969,000
January 13, 1999	50	36	1: 76,275,360
May 15, 2002	52	52	1: 135,145,920
June 22, 2005	56	46	1: 175,711,536
October 19, 2013	75	15	1: 258,890,850
October 28, 2017	70	25	1: 302,575,350
April 8, 2025	70	24	1: 290,472,336

=== Megaplier ===
Each individual Mega Millions game has an associated multiplier, called the Megaplier; it is functionally similar to Powerball's Power Play, except the latter limits the second-prize multiplier to 2×. (Power Play is not offered in California because the parimutuel prize structure required by California law is not compatible with the multiplier, while the Megaplier wasn't offered in California prior to the April 2025 format change for the same reason) Prior to April 5, 2025, the Megaplier could be activated by adding $1 to a basic Mega Millions game (for a $3 purchase). A player will have their non-jackpot prize multiplied by 2, 3, 4, 5 or 10; the 10X multiplier was introduced with the April 2025 format change. The Megaplier is drawn for each play by a random number generator (RNG) (before April 2025 it was drawn by the Texas Lottery, who before the cross-sell expansion on January 31, 2010, was the only lottery to offer Megaplier). The odds for each Megaplier possibility are not uniform.

Megaplier	Former odds (October 8, 2017 – April 4, 2025)	Current odds
2×	1:2	1:2.13
3×	1:1.5	1:3.2
4×	1:4	1.8
5×	1:14	1:16
10×	N/A	1:32

Megaplier wagers made for drawings from September 12, 2010, through October 18, 2013, that won second prize (then $250,000) were automatically elevated to 4×, winning $1 million. This "guarantee" did not carry over to the following version of Mega Millions, although the $1 million second prize becomes $5 million if the Megaplier is 5×.

=== Winning and probability ===
Former Mega Millions odds (October 19, 2013 – October 27, 2017):

Matches		Prize	Approximate probability of winning
White balls (pool of 75)	Mega Ball (pool of 15)	Prize	Approximate probability of winning
5	1	Jackpot	1 in 258,890,850
5	0	$1 million	1 in 18,492,204
4	1	$5,000	1 in 739,688
4	0	$500	1 in 52,835
3	1	$50	1 in 10,720
3	0	$5	1 in 766
2	1	$5	1 in 473
1	1	$2	1 in 56
0	1	$1	1 in 21

The probability and odds can be taken into a mathematical perspective: The probability of winning the jackpot (through October 27, 2017) was 1:(_{75}C_{5}) × (15), that is: 75 ways for the first white ball times 74 ways for the second times 73 for the third times 72 for the fourth times 71 for the last white ball divided by 5 × 4 × 3 × 2 × 1, or 5!, and this number is then multiplied by 15 (15 possible numbers for the "Megaball"). Therefore, (75 × 74 × 73 × 72 × 71)/(5 × 4 × 3 × 2 × 1) × 15 = 258,890,850, which means any combination of five white balls plus the Megaball has a 1:258,890,850 chance of winning the jackpot. Similarly, the odds for second prize were 1:(_{75}C_{5}) × (15/14) = 1: 18,492,204 chance of winning. The overall probability of winning any prize was 1 in 14.7. If there are no jackpot winners for a specific drawing, the jackpot will keep increasing; however, the odds will still remain the same.

Payouts through October 18, 2013:

Matches		Prize	Approximate probability of winning
White balls (pool of 56)	Mega Ball (pool of 46)	Prize	Approximate probability of winning
5	1	Jackpot	1 in 175,711,536 (_{56}C_{5}×46)
5	0	$250,000	1 in 3,904,701 (_{56}C_{5}×46/45)
4	1	$10,000	1 in 689,065
4	0	$150	1 in 15,313
3	1	$150	1 in 13,781
2	1	$10	1 in 844
3	0	$7	1 in 306
1	1	$3	1 in 141
0	1	$2	1 in 74.8 (the probability for this prize was not 1:46, because there is the possibility of matching at least one of the "white" balls, which decreases the likelihood of matching only the "Mega Ball")

Overall probabilities: 1 in 755 of winning any of the top six prizes, 1 in 40 of winning any prize.

In California, prize levels are paid on a parimutuel basis, rather than the fixed lower-tier amounts for winners in other Mega Millions jurisdictions. California's eight lower-tier Mega Millions prize pools are separate from those shared by the other 45 lotteries. California's second prize is a "secondary jackpot," its payout sometimes exceeds $1 million cash, even though California did not offer the Megaplier until the April 2025 format changes.

=== Payment options and claiming prizes ===
In New Jersey and Texas lotteries, players must choose, in advance, whether they wish to collect a jackpot prize in cash or annuity. New Jersey winners can change an annuity ticket to cash should they be eligible to claim a jackpot, but the choice is binding in Texas. The other Mega Millions members allow the cash/annuity choice to be made after winning (usually 60 days after claiming the ticket), although in Florida, the 60-day "clock" starts with the drawing in which the jackpot prize was won.

If a jackpot prize is not claimed within the respective jurisdiction's time limit, each of the 46 Mega Millions members gets back the money they contributed to that jackpot. Each of the 46 lotteries has rules in regards to unclaimed prizes, most Mega Millions members set aside unclaimed winnings for educational purposes.

In 2007, a $31 million prize went unclaimed in New York. Many prizes of $250,000 each have been unclaimed, including several in Michigan for 2007 drawings.

Mega Millions winners have either 180 days (California nonjackpot prizes only) or one year to claim prizes, including the jackpot (although some Mega Millions winners lose the right to collect a jackpot in cash if they wait more than 60 days after the drawing).

The minimum age to purchase a Mega Millions ticket is 18, except in Arizona, Iowa, Louisiana, and Mississippi, where the minimum age is 21, in Nebraska, it is 19. Generally (an exception is Virginia), minors can win on tickets received as gifts, the rules according to each Mega Millions member vary for minors receiving prizes.

Rules vary according to the applicable laws and regulations in the jurisdiction where the ticket is sold, and the winner's residence (e.g., if New Jerseyans win on a ticket bought near their workplace in Manhattan). Mega Millions winnings are exempt from state income tax in California, while Florida, New Hampshire, South Dakota, Tennessee, Texas, Washington, and Wyoming do not have an income tax. Some residents of New York City and Yonkers, New York, pay three levels of income tax, as these cities levy income taxes.

== Drawings ==
Drawings are usually held at the studios of WSB-TV in Atlanta, Georgia. The original host was WSB's chief meteorologist, Glenn Burns. From 2008 to 2025, the drawings have been emceed by the hosts of the Georgia Lottery drawings John Crow, Atlanta radio host Carol Blackmon and Adria Wofford. Sabrina Cupit originally served as the secondary host if neither Crow or Blackmon are available. In 2022, Cupit was replaced by Wofford. In 2023, Wofford was promoted to co-host serving alongside Crow while Blackmon was demoted to back-up host if neither primary host is available. On Friday, December 12, 2025, Crow announced that he will be soft retiring from Mega Millions and The Georgia Lottery on December 26 to spend more time with family. He will remain with the lottery on an “emeritus” status. As of 2026, Blackmon hosts the drawings on Tuesdays, Wofford hosts the drawings on Fridays. Drawings are supervised by Lottery Security and certified by Preston, CPA.

Crow usually begins each drawing with “Let's see if I can make you a millionaire tonight.” or “Let's see you can win some money!” and signs off with "Play on, America!"

Before the January 31, 2010, cross-sell expansion, Mega Millions was the only multi-jurisdictional lottery whose drawings were carried nationally, instead of airing only on stations in participating jurisdictions. Chicago-based cable superstation WGN-TV simulcast Mega Millions drawings on its national WGN America feed immediately following WGN's 9:00 p.m. Central Time newscast. Following the cross-sell expansion, WGN also began airing Powerball drawings nationally. WGN served as a default carrier of both major games where no local television station carried either multi-jurisdictional lottery's drawings. Both drawings were removed from WGN America in late 2014 when it ceased carrying WGN's newscasts.

Two machines are used in each Mega Millions drawing. The model used for Mega Millions is the Criterion II, manufactured by Smartplay International of Edgewater Park, New Jersey. The balls are moved around by means of counter-rotating arms which randomly mix the balls. Individually, the five white balls, several seconds apart, drop through a hole in the bottom of the mixing drum.

== Record jackpots (listed by annuity value) ==
Cash value (in millions USD)	Annuity value (in millions USD)	Drawing date	Winner(s)	Description
$783.3	$1,602	August 8, 2023	1 (FL)	Largest annuity jackpot, second largest cash value jackpot
$878	$1,537	October 23, 2018	1 (SC)	Second largest annuity jackpot, largest cash value jackpot
$723.5	$1,348	January 13, 2023	1 (ME)	Third largest jackpot (annuity)
$780.5	$1,337	July 29, 2022	1 (IL)	Fourth largest jackpot (annuity)
$572	$1,270	December 27, 2024	1 (CA)	
$537.5	$1,130	March 26, 2024	1 (NJ)	
$739.6	$1,000	January 22, 2021	1 (MI)	
$452.2	$980.0	November 15, 2025	1 (GA)	
$474	$656	March 30, 2012	3 (MD, KS, IL)	
$347.7	$648	December 17, 2013	2 (CA, GA)	
$320	$543	July 24, 2018	1 (CA)	
$378	$536	July 8, 2016	1 (IN)	
$324.6	$533	March 30, 2018	1 (NJ)	
$282	$451	January 5, 2018	1 (FL)	
$262	$437	January 1, 2019	1 (NY)	
$231	$414	March 18, 2014	2 (MD, FL)	
$247.3	$393	August 11, 2017	1 (IL)	
$240	$380	January 4, 2011	2 (ID, WA)	
$233	$390	March 6, 2007	2 (GA, NJ)	
$224	$400	March 18, 2014	2 (FL, MD)	
$210	$336	August 28, 2009	2 (CA, NY)	NY winner chose annuity (the cash/annuity choice made "when playing" required per NY Lottery rules at the time)
$208.3	$330	August 31, 2007	4 (NJ, MD, TX, VA)	
$197.5	$326	November 4, 2014	1 (NY)	Sold in Middletown, Orange County
$202.9	$319	March 25, 2011	1 (Albany, NY)	
$180	$363	May 9, 2000	2 (IL, MI)	Largest The Big Game jackpot

== Revenue ==
Approximately 50% of Mega Millions sales is returned to players as prizes, the remainder is split (each lottery has different rules regarding these funds) among retailers, marketing, and operations, as well as the 47 jurisdictions offering the game, different lotteries use the proceeds in different ways.

== Miscellany ==
In 2005, Mega Millions was the target of a mailing scam. A letter bearing the Mega Millions logo was used in a string of lottery scams designed to trick people into providing personal financial information by cashing bogus checks. The letter, which had been sent to people in several states via standard mail, included a check for what the scammers said was an unclaimed Mega Millions prize. If the check was cashed, it bounced, but not before the bank stamped it with a routing number and personal account information and sent it back to the fraudulent organization, providing them with the recipients' financial information.

A budget impasse due to the 2006 New Jersey Government shutdown led to the temporary closing of its non-essential agencies on July 1, 2006. Among the casualties were the Atlantic City casinos and the New Jersey Lottery. Not only were New Jersey's in-house games (such as Pick-6) not drawn for about a week, but all New Jersey lottery terminals were shut down, meaning Mega Millions could not be played in New Jersey, even though Mega Millions was drawn as usual. A similar shutdown happened in Minnesota on July 1, 2011.

Elecia Battle made national headlines in January 2004 when she claimed that she had lost the winning ticket in the December 30, 2003, Mega Millions drawing. She then filed a lawsuit against the woman who had come forward with the ticket, Rebecca Jemison. Several days later, when confronted with contradictory evidence, she admitted that she had lied. Battle was charged with filing a false police report the following day. As a result of this false report, she was fined $1,000, ordered to perform 50 hours of community service, and required to compensate the police and courts for various costs incurred.

The January 4, 2011, Mega Millions drawing drew attention for its similarity to "The Numbers," a sequence of six numbers that served as a plot device of the ABC drama series Lost. One such usage involved character Hugo "Hurley" Reyes playing the sequence in a similar "Mega Lotto" game, winning a nine-figure jackpot and subsequently experiencing numerous misfortunes in his personal life. The first three numbers (4, 8, 15) and mega ball (42) in the Mega Millions drawing matched the first three numbers and the final number (which Hurley also used as the "mega ball" number) in the Lost sequence. The last two numbers in the Mega Millions drawing did not match the last two numbers that were used in the scene. Those who played "The Numbers," including from quick-picks, won $150 ($118 in California) in a non-Megaplier game, $600 with the multiplier.

On May 11, 2022, Crow incorrectly called the mega ball number as a "6" instead of the actual "9," the numbers printed on the ball have an underline to denote their correct orientation. The New York Lottery paid $5,538 to customers before discovering the error.
