= Dan Metelsky =

American politician (born 1960)

Member of the Ohio House of Representatives from the 61st district
- In office January 9, 1996 – October 17, 2001
- Preceded by: Joseph Koziura
- Succeeded by: Joseph Koziura

Personal details
- Born: August 19, 1960 (age 65) Lorain, Ohio, U.S.
- Party: Democratic

George Daniel Metelsky (born August 19, 1960) is a former American politician who served as a Democratic member of the Ohio House of Representatives from 1996 to 2001. His district consisted of a portion of Lorain County, Ohio. He was succeeded by Joseph Koziura.

Before being elected to the Ohio House of Representatives Metelsky had been a city councilman for 12 in Lorain. After stepping down from the House in 2001 Metelsky held a post at the Ohio Lottery Commission from 2001 to 2008.
