= Craig Foltin =

American politician

Lenord Craig Foltin

47th Mayor of Lorain, Ohio
- In office January 2000 – August 1, 2007
- Preceded by: Joseph Koziura
- Succeeded by: John Romoser

L. Craig Foltin is a Republican politician who served as mayor of Lorain, Ohio from 2000 to 2007. At the age of 32, Foltin upset incumbent Joseph Koziura 51.5% to 48.5% in 1999 to win the mayoral seat in the City of Lorain, where Democrats outnumber Republicans five to one. He again won against Koziura in 2003 and won by a 55%–45% margin.

Foltin was endorsed several times by The Plain Dealer and The Morning Journal. Foltin has been featured in Cleveland Magazine, Inside Business, Crain's Cleveland Business and was a frequent guest of several Cleveland market morning and afternoon drive radio shows. He appeared on the major TV news broadcasts and was featured on several documentary shows on WVIZ.

== Education ==
- Doctor of Business Administration, June 1996, Major in Accounting, Minor in Information Systems, Cleveland State University, Cleveland, Ohio
- Master of Business Administration, June 1991, Area of Concentration: Finance, Cleveland State University
- Bachelor of Science in Accounting, June 1989, Ohio State University, Columbus, Ohio
- Lorain High School, Lorain, Ohio, June 1985

== 2006 congressional campaign ==
Craig Foltin ran for the Ohio's 13th congressional district against trial lawyer Betty Sutton. Although the 13th was one of the most Democratic districts in Ohio, the Republicans had high hopes for Foltin since he was the Republican mayor of a heavily Democratic city. However, Foltin could not overcome the strong anti-Republican mood in the district or the presence of the district's incumbent congressman, Sherrod Brown, atop the ballot as the Democratic candidate for Senate. He was defeated, gaining only 39 percent of the vote. In May 2007, Foltin announced his resignation as mayor of Lorain effective August 1, 2007 to take the Executive Vice-President of Finance position at Cuyahoga Community College in Cleveland, Ohio.

== See also ==
- List of mayors of Lorain, Ohio
