= Detroit Metropolitan Airport =

Airport serving Detroit, Michigan, United States

Detroit Metropolitan Wayne County Airport

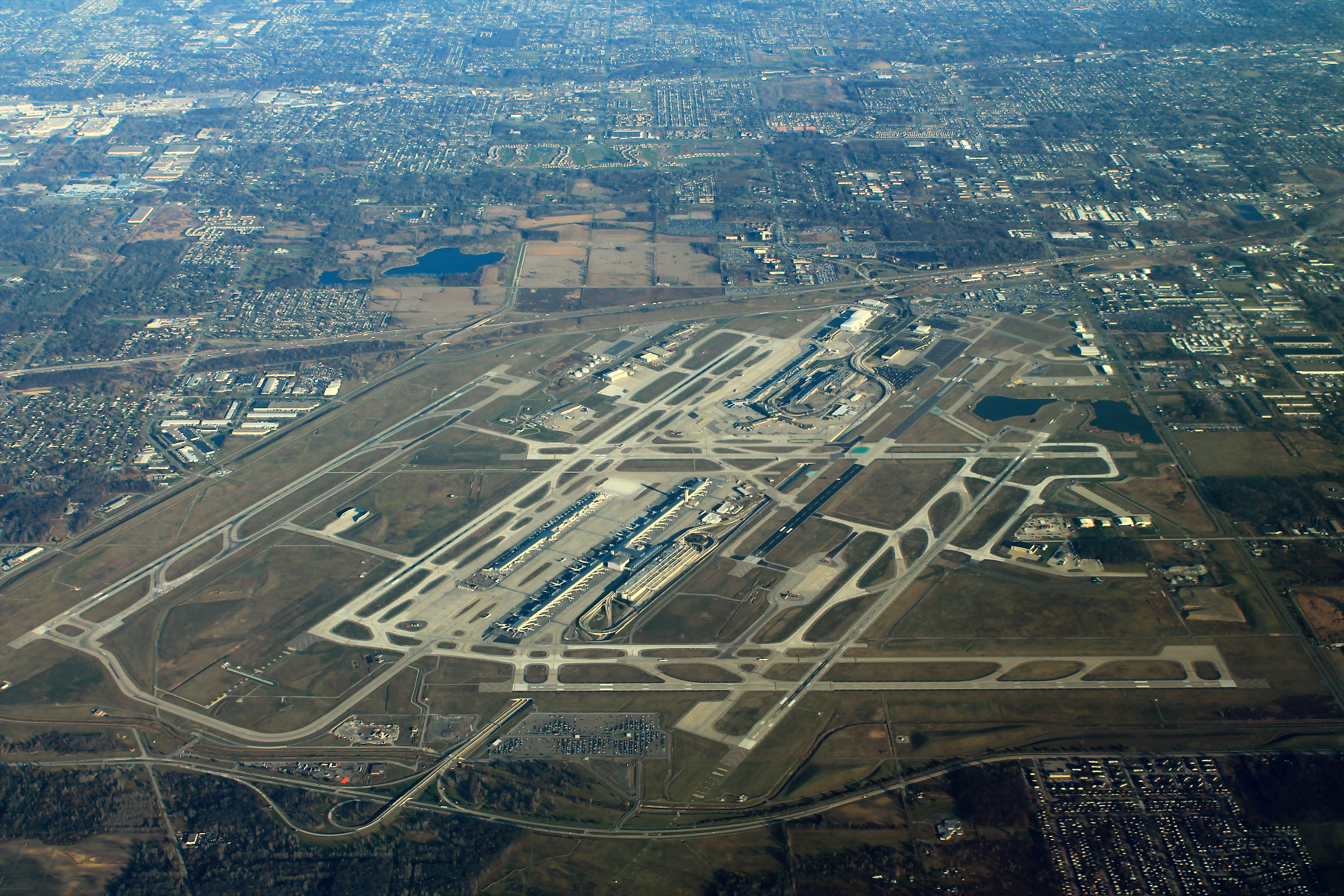
- IATA: DTW; ICAO: KDTW; FAA LID: DTW; WMO: 72537

Summary
- Airport type: Public
- Owner/Operator: Wayne County Airport Authority
- Serves: Detroit–Windsor; Metro Detroit; Ann Arbor; Toledo metropolitan area; Northwest Ohio
- Location: Romulus, Michigan, U.S.
- Opened: September 4, 1930; 96 years ago
- Hub for: Delta Air Lines
- Time zone: EST (UTC−05:00)
  - Summer (DST): EDT (UTC−04:00)
- Elevation AMSL: 197 m (646 ft)
- Coordinates: 42°12′45″N 083°21′12″W
- Website: metroairport.com

Maps
- FAA airport diagram
- Interactive map of Detroit Metropolitan; Wayne County Airport

Runways
Direction	Length		Surface
Direction	m	ft	Surface
4R/22L	3,659	12,003	Concrete
4L/22R	3,048	10,000	Concrete
3R/21L	3,048	10,001	Concrete
3L/21R	2,591	8,500	Concrete
9L/27R	2,654	8,708	Concrete
9R/27L	2,591	8,500	Concrete

Statistics (2025)
- Passengers: 33,372,682 ▲1.2%
- Cargo (lbs.): 354,581,419
- Aircraft operations: 321,759
- Source: Detroit Metropolitan Airport

Detroit Metropolitan Wayne County Airport (IATA: DTW, ICAO: KDTW, FAA LID: DTW) is a major international airport serving Detroit and the surrounding metropolitan area, in the U.S. state of Michigan. Operated by the Wayne County Airport Authority, it is located approximately 18 miles (29 km) southwest of Detroit city center, in Romulus, a suburb of Detroit. It is by far Michigan's busiest airport, with about 8 times as many enplanements and deplanements as the next busiest, Gerald R. Ford International Airport in Grand Rapids, and more than all other airports in the state combined.

The Federal Aviation Administration (FAA) National Plan of Integrated Airport Systems for 2017–2021 categorized it as a large hub primary commercial service facility. The airport covers 4,850 acres (1,960 ha) of land.

The airport is the second-largest hub for Delta Air Lines. The airport has service to 32 international destinations and to 43 states across the United States. The airport has six runways, two terminals, and 129 in-service gates.Detroit Metropolitan Airport has maintenance facilities capable of servicing and repairing aircraft as large as the Boeing 747-400.

Metro Airport serves the metropolitan Detroit area; the Toledo, Ohio, area about 40 miles (64 km) south; the Ann Arbor area to the west; Windsor, Ontario; and Southwestern Ontario in Canada. The airport serves over 140 destinations, and was named the best large U.S. airport in customer satisfaction by J.D. Power & Associates in 2010, 2019, and 2022.

== History ==
Wayne County began to plan an airport in the western townships of the county as early as 1927. The following year, the county board of commissioners issued a $2 million bond to fund the purchase of one square mile (2.6 km^{2}) of land at the corner of Middlebelt and Wick roads, the northeastern boundary of today's airport. Construction was completed in 1929, and the first landing was on February 22, 1930; Wayne County Airport was dedicated on September 4, 1930. That year, Thompson Aeronautical Corporation, a forerunner of American Airlines, began service from the airport. From 1931 until 1945, the airport hosted Michigan Air National Guard flights operated by the United States Army Air Forces. It was named Romulus Field during the war; it was then all east of Merriman Road and north of Goddard Road. The intersection of the two runways is still visible at 42.23266°N 83.33564°W.

Wayne County expanded the airport to become Detroit's primary airport. It renamed it Detroit-Wayne Major Airport in 1947, and in the next three years expanded threefold as three more runways were built. In 1949, the airport added runways 3L/21R and 9L/27R, followed by runway 4R/22L in 1950. In 1946-47, most airline traffic moved from the cramped Detroit City Airport (now Coleman A. Young International Airport) northeast of downtown Detroit to Willow Run Airport over 20 miles (32 km) west of the city, and 10 miles (16 km) west of Wayne County Airport.

Pan American Airways (1954) and British Overseas Airways Corporation (1956) were the first passenger airlines at Detroit-Wayne Major. In the April 1957 Official Airline Guide they were the only passenger airlines: three Pan Am DC-7Cs each week FRA–LHR–SNN–DTW–ORD and back, and one BOAC DC-7C each week LHR–PIK–YUL–DTW–ORD and back (skipping YUL on the return flight).

Aerial photographs of DTW from 1949 and 1956 show the airport's expansion. In 1958, the Civil Aviation Administration—now the Federal Aviation Administration (FAA)—announced the inclusion of Detroit-Wayne in the first group of American airports to receive new long-range radar equipment, enabling the airport to become the first inland airport in the United States certified for jet airliners. Also, in 1958, airport management completed the Leroy C. Smith (South) Terminal and gave the airport its present name.

American Airlines moved from Willow Run to Detroit-Wayne in October 1958, followed by Northwest, Allegheny, and Delta in the next few months; the other airlines stayed at Willow Run until 1966.

Northwest's flights to Minneapolis were DTW's only nonstops west beyond Chicago and Milwaukee until 1966. The first scheduled jets were Delta DC-8s to Miami in late 1959. The North Terminal (later renamed the James M. Davey Terminal) opened in 1966, which was located on the current site of the Evans Terminal. A third terminal, the Michael Berry International Terminal, opened in 1974. The last of its original three parallel runways (3R/21L) was completed in 1976; a new parallel crosswind runway (9R/27L) opened in 1993.

Republic Airlines began hub operations in 1984, and its merger with Northwest Airlines in 1986 expanded the hub. The Northwest hub operated out of the Davey Terminal throughout the 1980s and 1990s. Transpacific flights began in 1987, with Northwest providing nonstop service to Tokyo–Narita. The last of Metro's six runways (4L/22R) was completed in December 2001 in preparation for the opening of the mile-long, 122-gate, $1.2 billion McNamara Terminal in the airport midfield in 2002. The airport remained a hub for Northwest Airlines until it merged with Delta Air Lines.

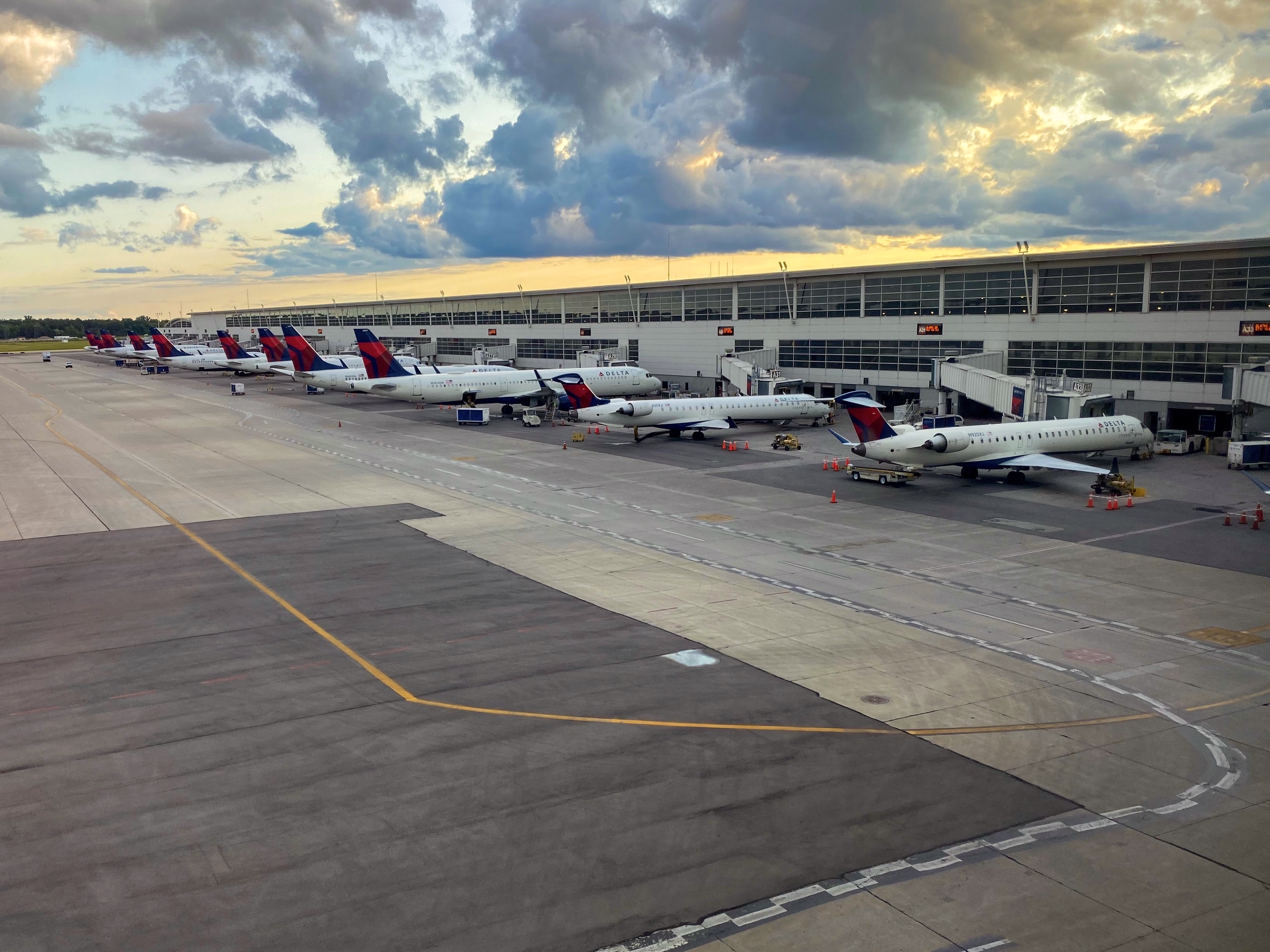
A view south along the McNamara Terminal at DTW (8/4/2020). Tails include aircraft types CRJ-900, A321, 737-900ER, A319, and A220.

The present Runway 3L/21R has had four identifiers. When it opened in 1949, it was Runway 3/21. With the opening of the new west side Runway 3L/21R in 1950, the original 3/21 became 3R/21L. With the opening of the new east side Runway 3R/21L in 1976, it became 3C/21C. With the opening of Runway 4L/22R in December 2001 and the splitting of the field into two sectors (3/21 on the east and 4/22 on the west), Runway 3C/21C became Runway 3L/21R.

Detroit was a major hub for Northwest Airlines from 1986 to 2010; Northwest merged with Delta Air Lines, and Detroit became Delta's second-largest hub.

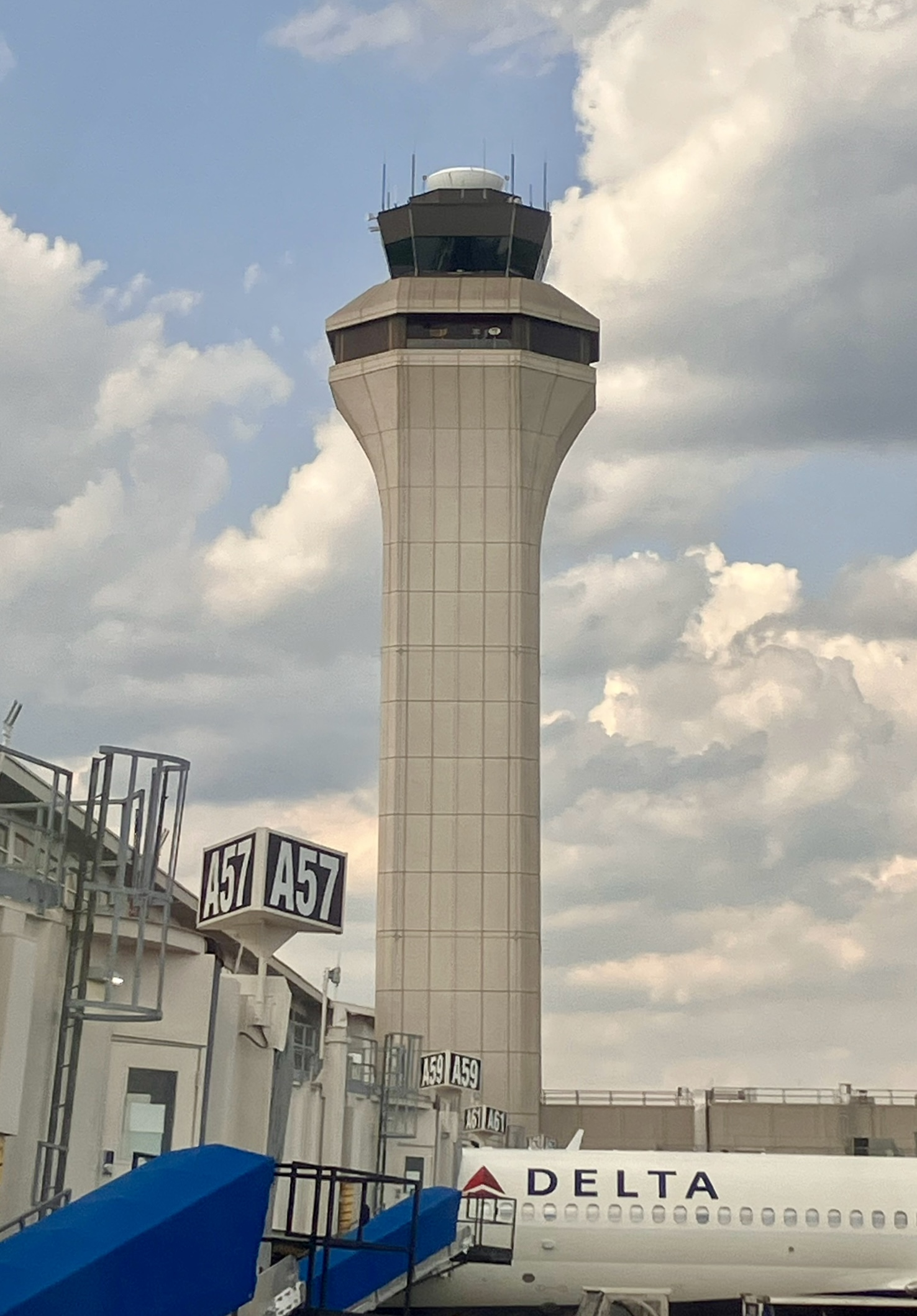
Air traffic control tower is located near the McNamara Terminal.

In April 2011, Lufthansa launched a unique curbside check-in and baggage check service for premium customers from DTW's North Terminal to Frankfurt and beyond. Lufthansa became the only airline allowing international customers departing from DTW to check their bags and receive a boarding pass at the curb, while DTW became Lufthansa's first North American gateway with this service.

Detroit's economy plunged in the Great Recession, causing airlines such as British Airways to drop flights to London–Heathrow and other airlines such as KLM and Virgin Atlantic to use codeshare flights through Delta Air Lines. The city has lost population, but Detroit Metropolitan Airport has since re-grown, and airlines are looking to expand or resume service. JetBlue began flights to Boston in February 2014. Spirit Airlines had grown at DTW, adding service to more East and West Coast cities. Until May 2, 2026, when the airline ceased all services, Spirit had increased its market share to over 10%, widening the gap as Metro Airport's second largest carrier.

Royal Jordanian was the first airline to schedule the Boeing 787 Dreamliner into Detroit, on December 1, 2014.

One of Delta Connection carriers, Compass Airlines chose to close its operating base in Detroit to move operations to the new Seattle hub in early 2015. Delta has replaced many of the existing Compass flights with mainline Delta flights to allow SkyWest Airlines and GoJet to open Detroit bases.

Beginning in January 2018, SMART began providing a direct connection from the airport to the Rosa Parks Transit Center in downtown Detroit via route 261, with stations at both the McNamara and Evans terminals.

On June 26, 2015, Spirit Airlines announced the construction of a new maintenance facility, saying it would bring $31.5 million and 82 jobs to the area. Spirit previously had a hangar that closed, forcing the airline to do maintenance at the gate with contract workers. With the new facility, which opened in May 2017, Spirit retained its operating base at Metro Airport.

In 2017, WOW Air announced service to Reykjavík on the Airbus A321. This marked the first ever entrance of a modern European low-cost carrier to DTW. In the summer of 2018, Reykjavík went from the 55th most traveled destination to the fifth due to this flight's popularity. Passengers could connect onwards in Reykjavík, boosting travel to European destinations. In March 2019, the airline ceased operations, leaving Metro Airport with no low-cost nonstop to Europe; the airport looked for replacement service to begin in 2020, but due to the COVID-19 pandemic, that effort ceased until 2022, when Icelandair and Delta announced seasonal flights to Reykjavík starting in 2023.

Since the Great Recession of 2008, Southeast Michigan has gone through an economic and industrial resurgence leading to several new airlines and services including service by Icelandair, Sun Country Airlines, Turkish Airlines, and WestJet. In October 2021, Turkish Airlines announced the intent to serve Detroit. Service began on November 13, 2023. In February 2023, WestJet announced seasonal service to Calgary, later adding seasonal service to Vancouver and Halifax.

== Facilities ==
DTW has two passenger terminals, with a total of 151 gates.

=== McNamara Terminal ===
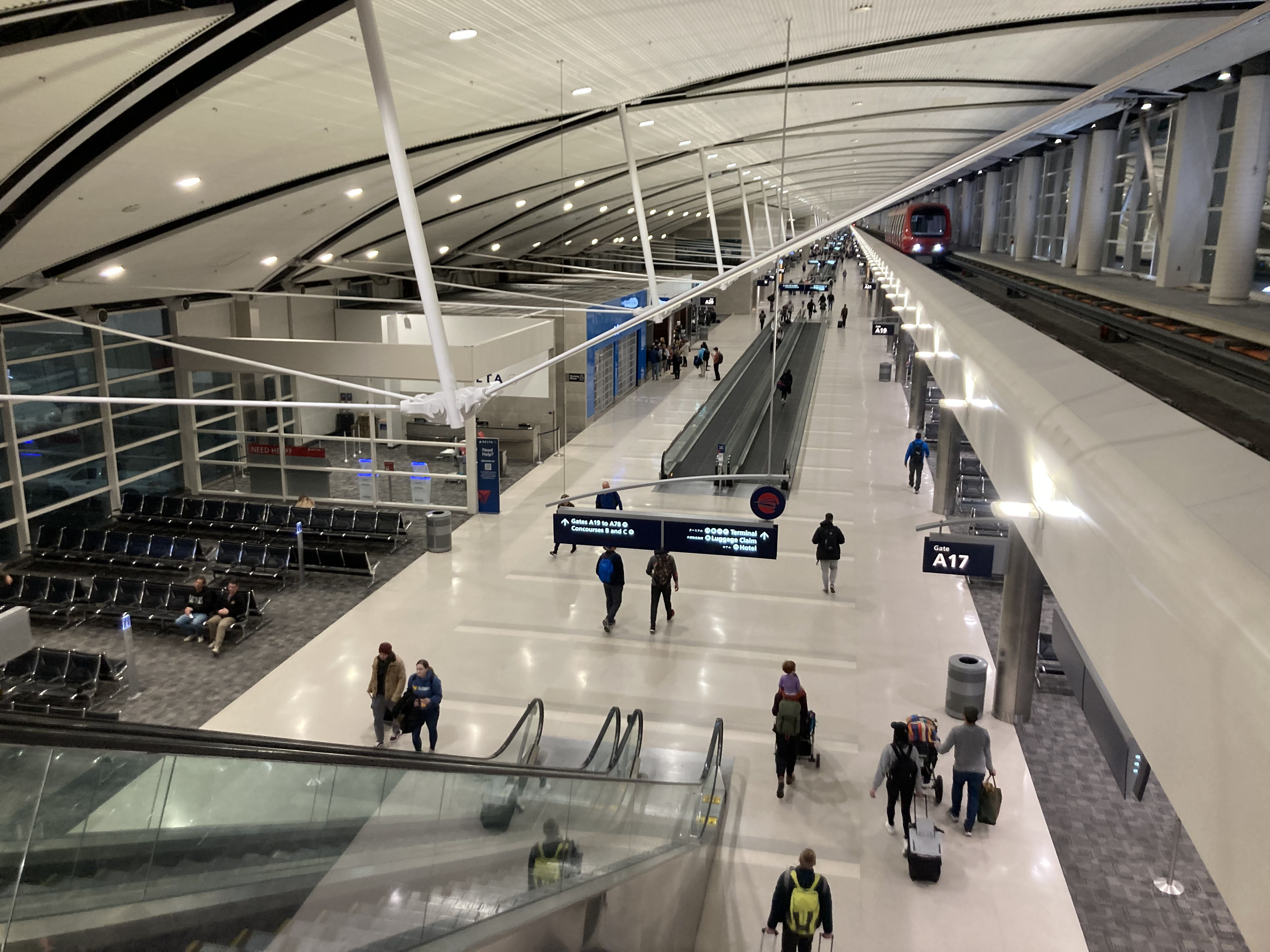
Interior of Concourse A in the McNamara Terminal

The Edward H. McNamara Terminal (MAC-nuh-mahr-uh) is the larger of the two terminals, containing 122 gates between its three concourses, lettered A, B, and C. As of 2026, the McNamara Terminal is served by Delta Air Lines, other members of the SkyTeam airline alliance, and WestJet.

Designed by SmithGroup and built by Hunt Construction Group, the McNamara Terminal opened on February 24, 2002, as the first major airport terminal in the U.S. to open after the September 11 attacks. It replaced the Davey Terminal as the primary base of Northwest Airlines in Detroit. Known during planning as the Midfield Terminal, the facility was named in honor of Edward H. McNamara, then the sitting county executive of Wayne County. It was developed in collaboration with Northwest to serve as its primary hub for international flights, and was prominently branded by the airline as the Northwest WorldGateway upon its opening.

McNamara Terminal's linear Concourse A houses 64 gates, and is roughly one mile (1.6 km) in length, ranking as the longest linear airport concourse in the U.S. and the second-longest in the world (behind Terminal 1 of Kansai International Airport in Japan). Moving walkways line the entire length of the concourse, as does the ExpressTram, an elevated automated people mover which quickly transports passengers between three stations within the concourse. Concourse A includes a variety of restaurants and retail stores, and four Delta Sky Club lounges. At the midpoint of the concourse is a large, laminar flow water feature designed by WET.

The smaller Concourses B and C, containing 17 and 41 gates respectively, run parallel to Concourse A, and combined are roughly 0.5 miles (0.80 km) long. They are primarily used for smaller aircraft, and feature jet bridges at all gates. They were expanded between 2004 and 2006. Concourses B and C also contain retail stores, restaurants, and a Delta Sky Club lounge.

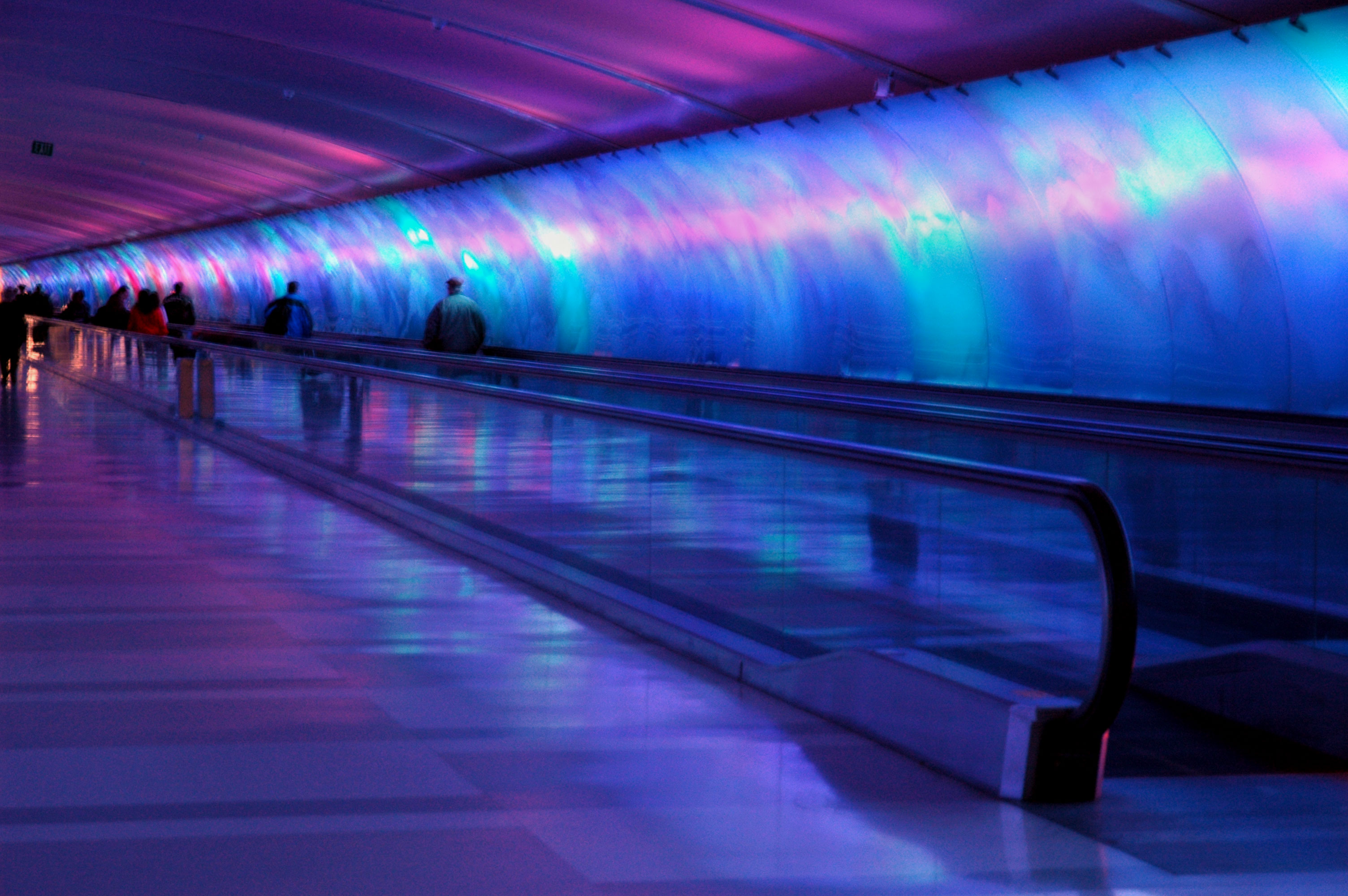
The Light Tunnel, which connects Concourse A with Concourses B and C, incorporates a light show with glass panels

Concourses B and C are connected to the main terminal and Concourse A by the underground pedestrian Light Tunnel, which runs under the airport ramp. The tunnel features an elaborate multi-colored light show behind sculpted glass panels, synchronized with an original musical score composed by Victor Alexeeff. This installation, one of the first large-scale uses of color-changing LED lighting in the United States, was produced by Mills James Productions with glasswork by Foxfire Glass Works of Pontiac, Michigan.

McNamara Terminal prominently features signage in Japanese, as it serves a large number of travelers from Japan.

The terminal houses ten international gates that are capable of dual jet bridge loading and unloading. The gates contain two exit configurations depending on the arriving flight. Domestic arrivals follow an upper path directly into the terminal, while international arrivals proceed downstairs to customs and immigration screening. The Customs and Border Protection processing center located in the terminal's lower level is designed to accommodate as many as 3,200 passengers per hour. International arriving passengers connecting to another flight are screened by TSA at a dedicated screening checkpoint within the international arrivals facility. Those passengers then exit directly back into the center of the A concourse. Passengers arriving from international destinations who end their trip in Detroit (or connecting to a flight via Evans Terminal) exit directly into a dedicated International Arrivals Hall on the lower level of the terminal.

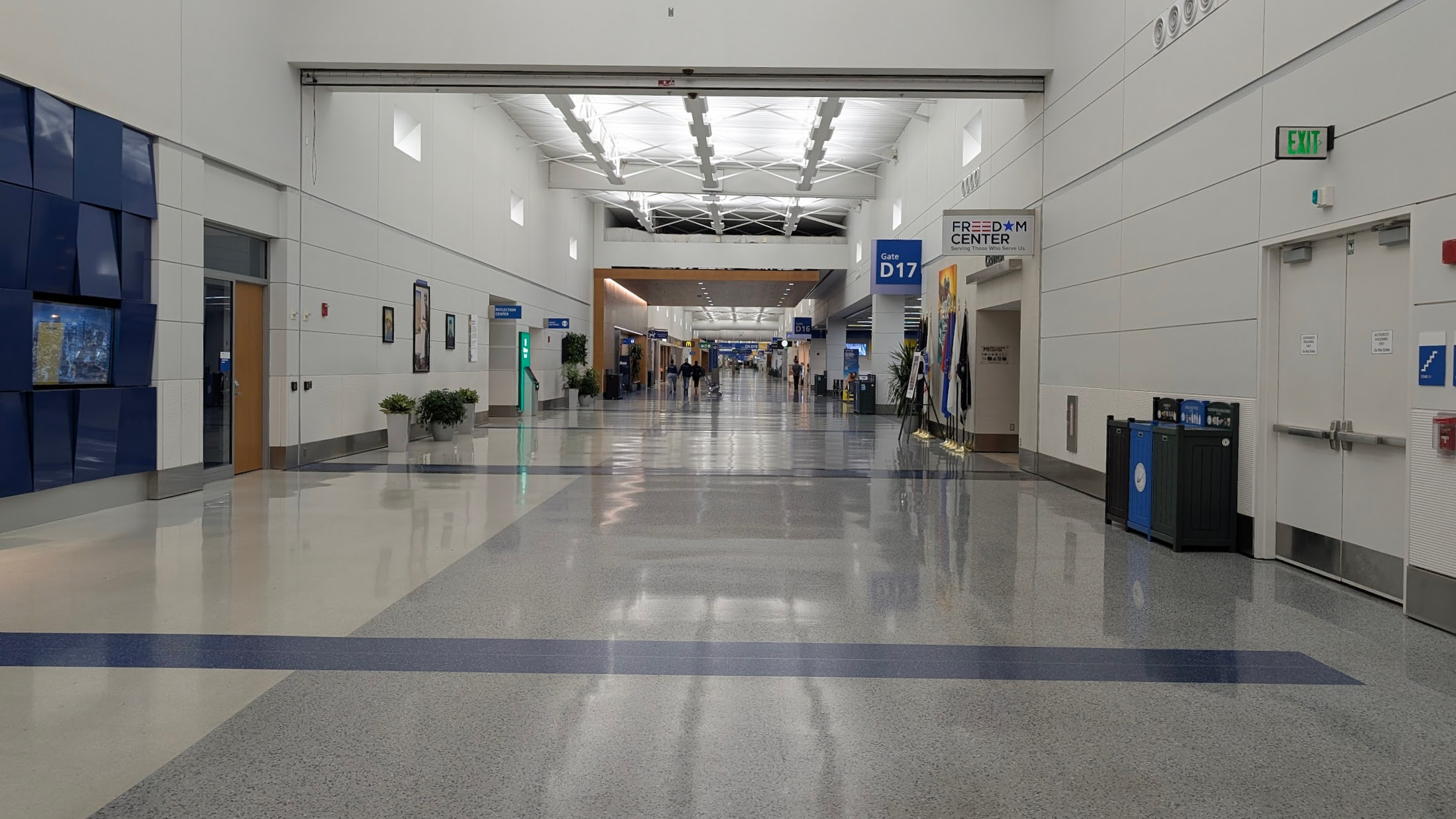
Interior of the Evans Terminal

=== Evans Terminal ===
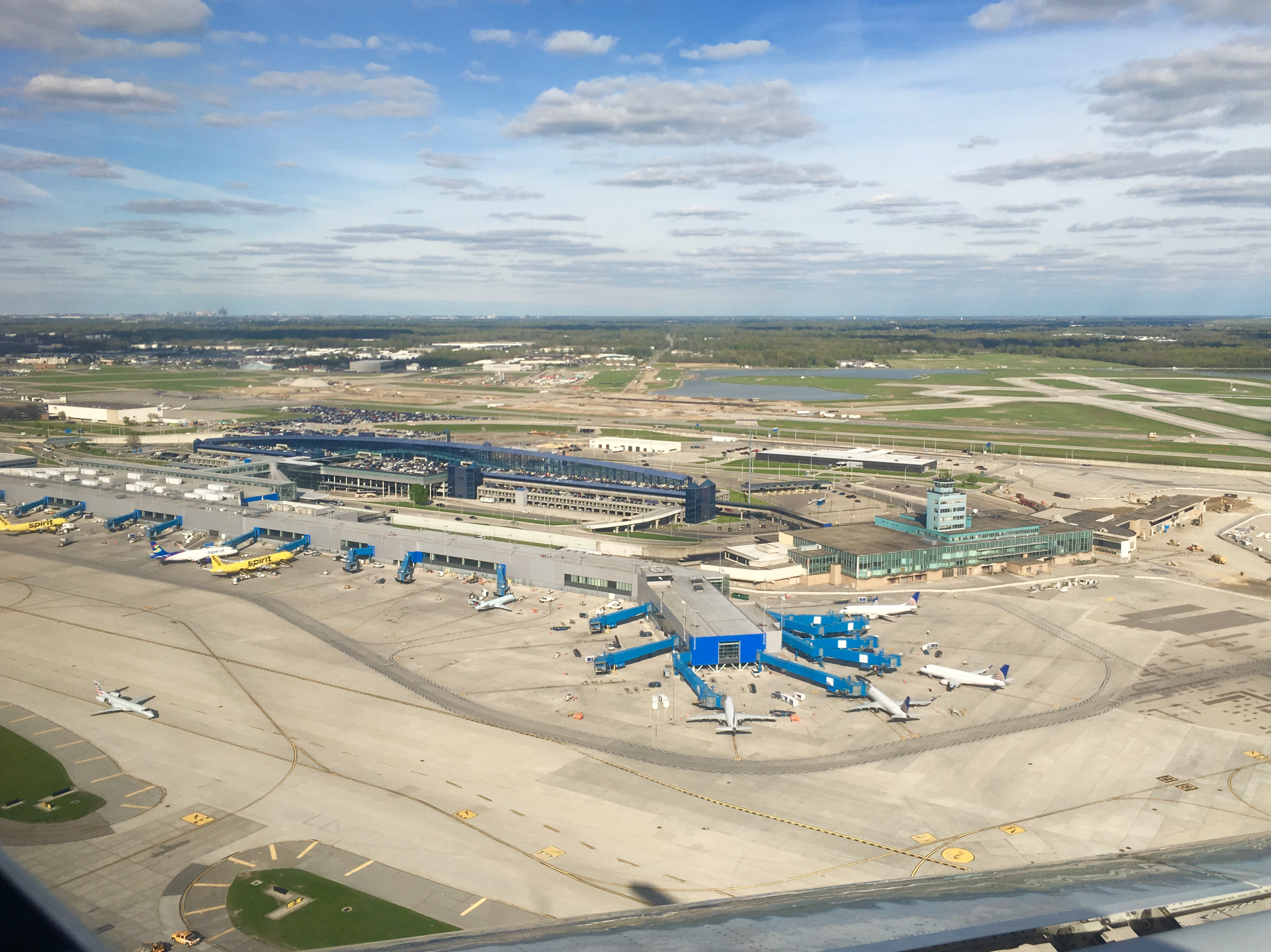
View of DTW's Evans Terminal and the remains of the Smith Terminal

The Warren Cleage Evans Terminal is the smaller of the two terminals. It is coextensive with concourse D, which is 0.5 miles (0.80 km) long, and contains 29 gates, which as of 2026 serve all flights operated by airlines which are not members of SkyTeam or partners of Delta Air Lines.

The Evans Terminal was originally known as the North Terminal, and opened on September 17, 2008, replacing the Berry and Smith terminals. It was designed by Gensler and built by a joint venture of Walbridge and Barton Malow. The Wayne County Airport Authority initially sought bids for the naming rights of the North Terminal, though those plans were abandoned in 2010. It was renamed in April 2022 after Warren Evans, who is the current county executive of Wayne County as of 2026.

Evans Terminal houses two six-lane security checkpoints, and eight gates equipped to serve international flights, which feed to U.S. Customs & Border Protection inspection facilities located on the lower level. It is also home to a Lufthansa Business and Senator Lounge, available to passengers flying in Lufthansa premium cabins as well as select Lufthansa and Star Alliance elite members. This lounge also grants access to Priority Pass members outside of peak hours.

=== Historical terminals ===
==== Berry Terminal ====
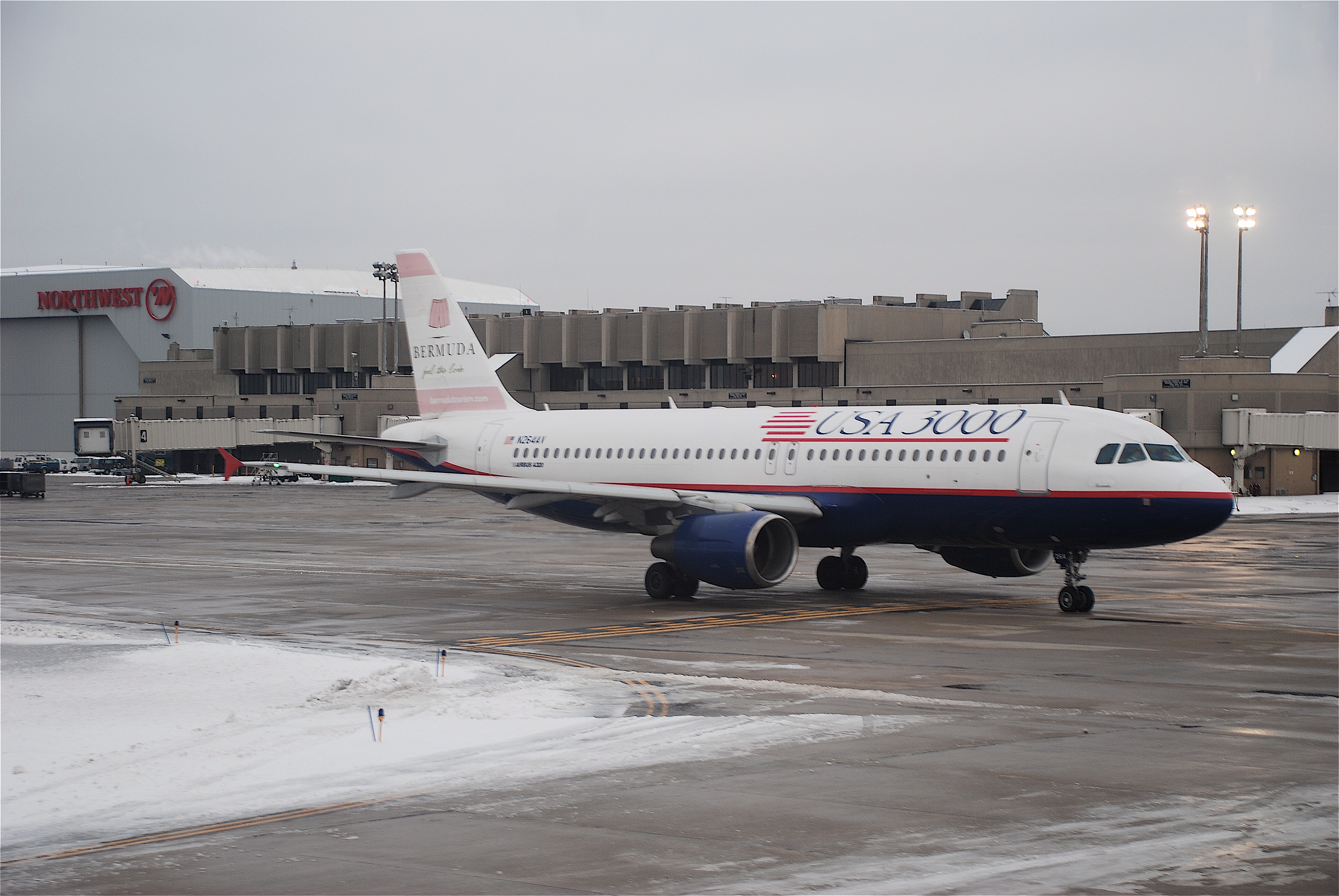
Berry Terminal in 2008, immediately prior to its closure

The Berry Terminal, named for the former airport commissioner Michael Berry, was designed by Detroit architect Louis G. Redstone, and opened in 1974 as the international terminal at DTW. It was decommissioned on September 17, 2008, and replaced by the Evans Terminal; however, the airport authority voted May 20, 2009, to renovate the terminal to house its offices. All international passengers would arrive at this terminal, pass through customs and immigration inspection, and continue on to their connecting flights by bus to adjacent terminals.

Originally containing six gates (two of which were removed in 2003 to allow for construction of an adjacent Northwest Airlines maintenance hangar), the terminal was later used for scheduled and charter flights. There were still several international scheduled flights on low cost carriers to destinations in the Caribbean and other warm-weathered places in the early 2000s (decade), including flights from Champion Air, Ryan International Airlines, and USA3000 Airlines. Four charter airlines also used this terminal.

Following its closure in 2008, the Berry Terminal became a popular space for commercial film and television production. Films such as Up in the Air (2009), Machine Gun Preacher (2011), and This Must Be the Place (2011) used the vacant terminal as a set (in addition to shooting in and around the airport's active terminals). The Berry Terminal was demolished in 2018.

==== Smith Terminal ====
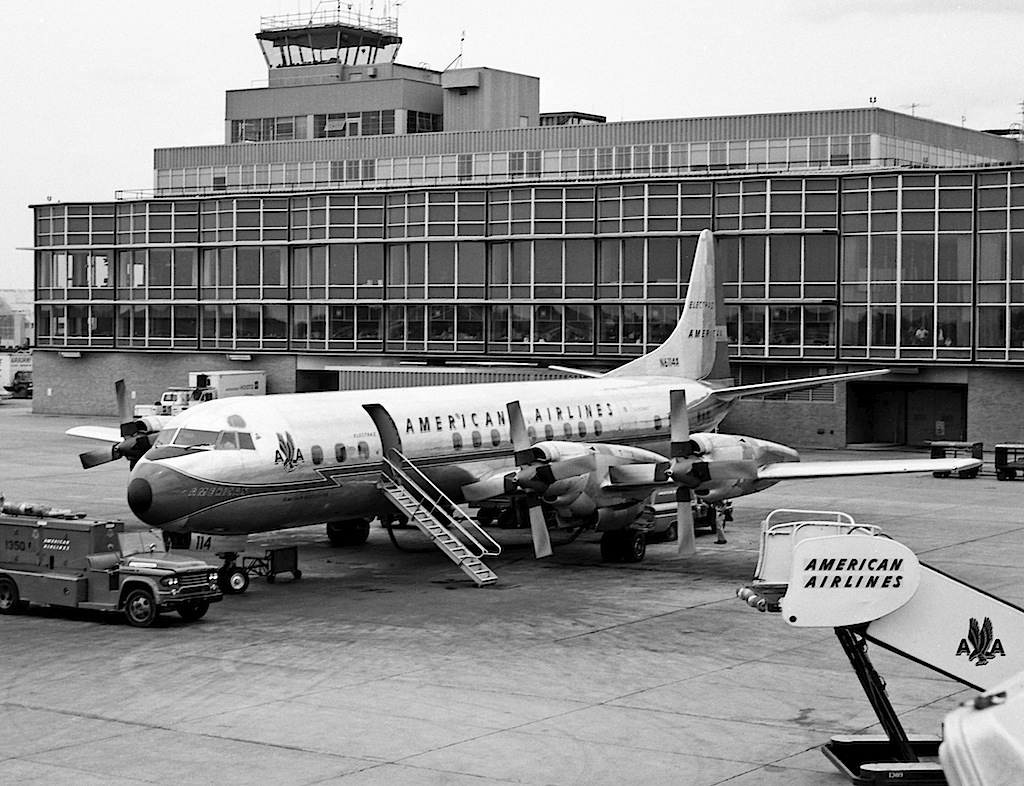
Smith Terminal in 1962

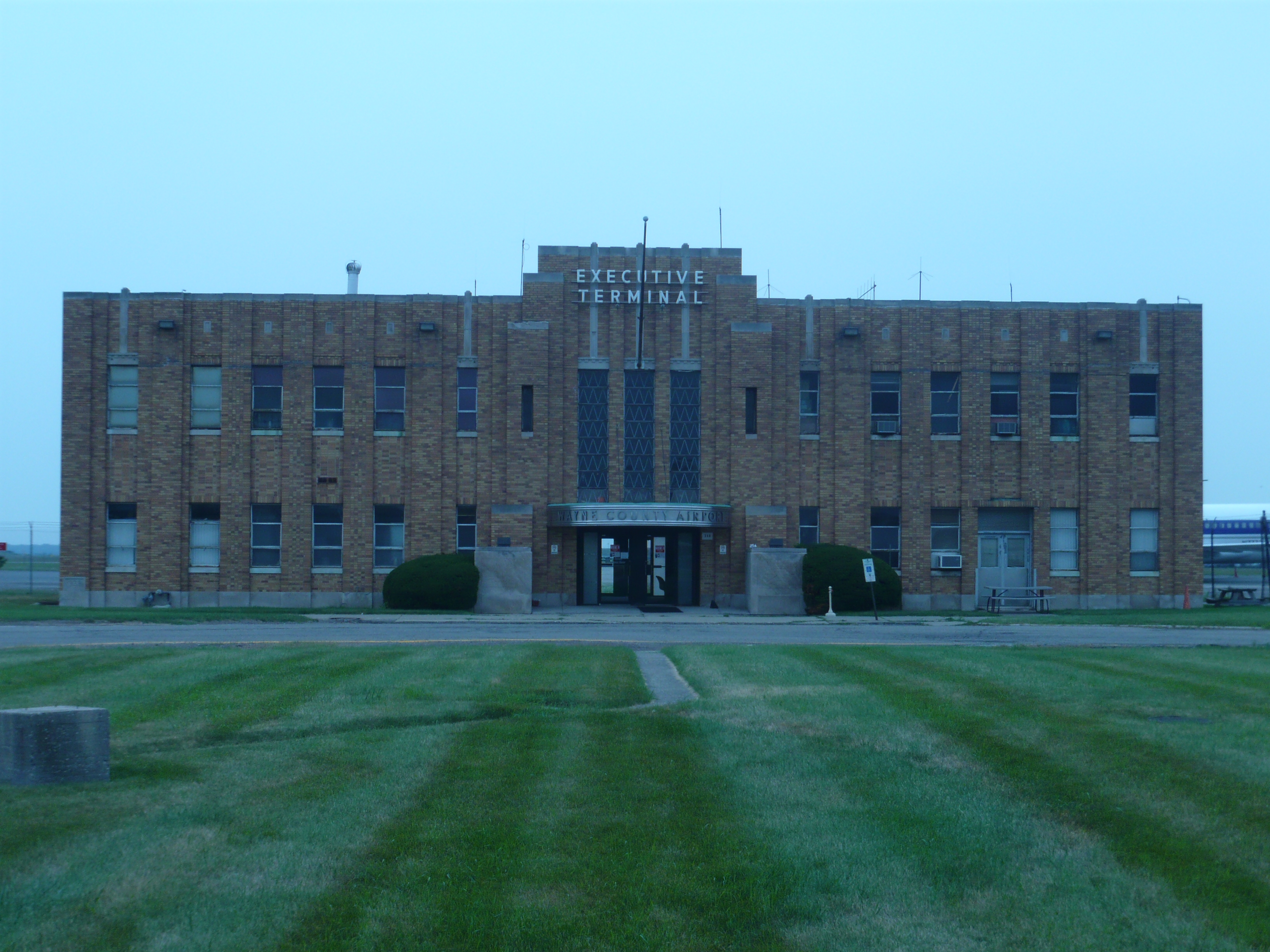
The former Executive Terminal, 2014

The Smith Terminal, named for Detroit-Wayne Major airport visionary Leroy C. Smith, was built in 1958. Though cited as the oldest of Metro Airport's terminals, that designation belongs to the Executive Terminal building located near Middlebelt Road and Lucas Drive, one-quarter-mile east. The Executive Terminal was built in the late 1920s and is still in operation today as home to ASIG, a flight support company.

The Smith Terminal's 32 gates originally housed Northwest Orient Airlines, Allegheny Airlines (forerunner to US Airways), Eastern Air Lines, and Pan-Am, among others. A control tower was included in the construction, and served its purpose until the late 1980s, when a new control tower was built near the site of the new McNamara Terminal.

In later years, Smith Terminal hosted North American carriers other than Northwest, Continental, and later Delta, which relocated to the McNamara Terminal in 2002 before its merger with Northwest.

State of the art for its time, the Smith Terminal eventually became victim to airline expansion. The design of the building did not allow for physical expansion of the ticketing area. To accommodate additional airlines, ticketing counters were constructed on the sides of the lobby in areas that previously held lounges and retail. In contrast, the North Terminal was constructed with future expansion in mind.

Spirit Airlines, which operated out of many of the gates once used by Northwest, made few upgrades to the gate areas in those parts of the terminal. The Northwest Airlines display boards near check-in counters at each gate remained in place, with the Northwest logos removed, and a Spirit information board simply affixed over the old signage.

On September 10, 2008, The Detroit News reported that Smith Terminal itself will not be demolished due to the airport authority offices remaining on the upper floors. However, the Detroit Free Press of October 9, 2008, stated that maintaining the terminal in its present condition would cost upwards of $4 million annually in utilities, a sore spot for airlines at DTW who foot the bill, in part, through airport landing fees; the airlines were hoping for a greater cost savings once the Smith and Berry Terminals were decommissioned. On May 20, 2009, the airport authority formally voted to totally vacate the Smith Terminal, while retaining and renovating the Berry Terminal for its offices.

Discussions were also raised regarding proposed construction of a new structure to house the Airport Authority offices and Airport Police, with a preliminary price tag of $31.5 million.

==== Davey Terminal ====
The James M. Davey Terminal was built in 1966 and was first known as "Terminal 2" or the "North Terminal". Designed by the firm of Smith, Hinchman and Grylls, it was said to be the largest post tensioned building in the world. Tapering cruciform columns around the perimeter and curved beams supported five large concrete roof panels. The lack of columns allowed maximum flexibility in the interior space. The spaces between the roof panels and exterior columns were filled with glass to allow abundant natural light into the building. It was renamed the "J. M. Davey Terminal" in 1975 in honor of former airport manager James M. Davey. It originally contained three concourses labeled C to E, as well as a Host Hotel which later was rebranded Marriott. In the early 1980s, a separate ticketing area was constructed to the north of the Davey Terminal, along with Concourses F and G to eventually accommodate Northwest Airlink's regional jet fleet.

Over time, the terminal and added concourse began showing its age due to its layout and poor maintenance, hastened further by increased aircraft traffic, which it was not designed to handle efficiently. Despite this, more gates were added to Concourse C in a short-term expansion project in the early 1990s, making it 26 gates in length. This concourse was considered the worst by most travelers due to its long distance from the center of the terminal, and for its length.

The Davey Terminal was originally the principal base of operations for Republic Airlines, which merged with Northwest Orient Airlines to become Northwest Airlines in 1986. Upon relocation of Northwest operations to the McNamara Terminal, the Davey Terminal was mothballed for three years before demolition of the ticketing area and Concourse G began October 17, 2005, to prepare for the North Terminal project. All concourses of the Davey Terminal and adjoining Marriott hotel, except gates 1 to 11 of Concourse C, were subsequently demolished in 2005–06 (the remaining gates were in use by Spirit Airlines until the new North Terminal (now Evans Terminal) opened on September 17, 2008).

=== Ground transportation ===
The airport is accessible from I-94 via Merriman Road (exit 198), which is the nearest entrance to the Evans Terminal, and from I-275 via Eureka Road (exit 15), which is closer to the McNamara Terminal. Both entrances and the terminals are connected by John D. Dingell Drive, an expressway completed in 1999 and named after the longtime Congressman. Cell phone lots are located near both entrances.

The airport includes two large parking garages, one adjacent to each terminal. The McNamara Terminal parking garage includes 11,500 spaces, spanning 1,863,000 square feet (173,100 m^{2}), and is reportedly the third-largest parking garage in the world. Adjacent to the Evans Terminal is the Big Blue Deck, which was constructed between 1992 and 1994 to serve the Smith and Berry terminals, and later expanded with the opening of Evans Terminal.

Free shuttle buses are available between the two terminals, and also connect to the Green parking lots. Rental car companies provide their own shuttles, as do private offsite parking lots and most hotels in the airport's vicinity.

==== Public transit ====
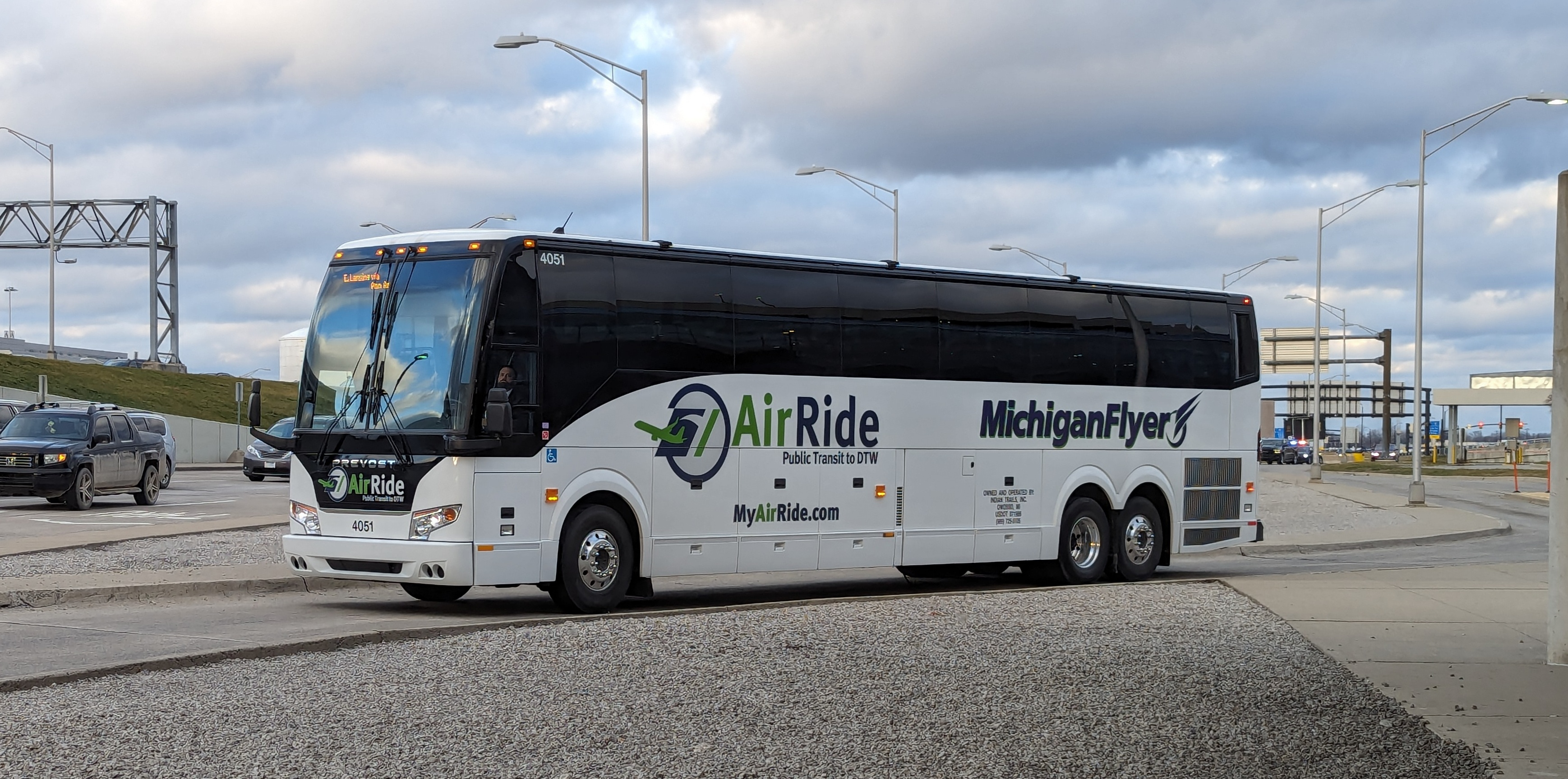
Michigan Flyer arriving at Evans Terminal

Multiple public transit bus services serve Metro Airport:

- The RTA's Detroit Air Xpress (DAX) provides non-stop service from both terminals to downtown Detroit via I-94.
- SMART operates the FAST Michigan, a limited-stop bus service from both terminals to downtown Detroit via Michigan Avenue and Dearborn.
- The Michigan Flyer intercity bus service offers transportation from both terminals to Ann Arbor and East Lansing.
- SMART additionally operates two local bus routes originating at Metro Airport: route 125, to communities in the Downriver region of southern Wayne County, serves both terminals; and route 280, to downtown Romulus and other suburbs in western Wayne County, serves only the Evans Terminal.
- Robert Q Airbus, a private operator, offers scheduled bus service from Metro Airport to Windsor, London, and other cities in Ontario, Canada.

Transit buses board from the Ground Transportation Center at the Evans Terminal, and from the departures drop-off area at McNamara.

== Airlines and destinations ==
=== Passenger ===
Airlines	Destinations
Aeroméxico Connect	Monterrey, Querétaro
Air Canada Express	Toronto–Pearson; Seasonal: Montréal–Trudeau
Air France	Paris–Charles de Gaulle
Alaska Airlines	Seattle/Tacoma
American Airlines	Charlotte, Dallas/Fort Worth, Miami, Phoenix–Sky Harbor; Seasonal: Chicago–O'Hare, Philadelphia
American Eagle	Chicago–O'Hare, New York–LaGuardia, Philadelphia, Washington–National
Avelo Airlines	Seasonal: Lakeland, New Haven
Delta Air Lines	Amsterdam, Atlanta, Austin, Baltimore, Birmingham (AL), Boston, Buffalo, Cancún, Charlotte, Chicago–O'Hare, Dallas/Fort Worth, Denver, Fort Lauderdale, Fort Myers, Frankfurt, Hartford, Honolulu, Houston–Intercontinental, Jacksonville (FL), Kansas City, Las Vegas, London–Heathrow, Los Angeles, Madison, Memphis, Mexico City–Benito Juárez, Miami, Milwaukee, Minneapolis/St. Paul, Myrtle Beach, Nashville, New Orleans, New York–JFK, New York–LaGuardia, Newark, Norfolk, Orlando, Orange County, Paris–Charles de Gaulle, Philadelphia, Phoenix–Sky Harbor, Portland (OR), Raleigh/Durham, Rome–Fiumicino, Sacramento, Salt Lake City, San Antonio, San Diego, San Francisco, San Juan, Savannah, Seattle/Tacoma, Seoul–Incheon, Shanghai–Pudong, St. Louis, Syracuse, Tampa, Tokyo–Haneda, Traverse City, Washington–National, West Palm Beach; Seasonal: Albany, Anchorage, Aruba (begins December 19, 2026), Athens (begins June 8, 2027), Charleston (SC), Dublin, Grand Cayman, Greenville/Spartanburg, Liberia (CR), Montego Bay, Munich, Nassau, Pittsburgh, Portland (ME), Providenciales, Puerto Vallarta, Punta Cana, Reykjavík–Keflavík, Richmond, San José del Cabo, Sarasota, Washington–Dulles
Delta Connection	Albany, Alpena, Appleton, Binghamton, Birmingham (AL), Buffalo, Burlington (VT), Charleston (SC), Chattanooga, Chicago–Midway, Chicago–O'Hare, Cincinnati, Cleveland, Columbus–Glenn, Des Moines, Elmira, Escanaba (MI), Fayetteville/Bentonville, Fort Wayne, Grand Rapids, Green Bay, Greensboro, Greenville/Spartanburg, Harrisburg, Huntsville, Indianapolis, Iron Mountain, Kalamazoo, Knoxville, Lansing, Lexington, Louisville, Madison, Marquette, Memphis, Milwaukee, Montréal–Trudeau, New York–JFK, Norfolk, Omaha, Pellston, Pittsburgh, Portland (ME), Providence, Richmond, Rochester (NY), Saginaw, Sault Ste. Marie (MI), South Bend, Syracuse, Toronto–Pearson, Traverse City, Washington–Dulles, White Plains; Seasonal: Bangor, Savannah
Frontier Airlines	Atlanta, Baltimore, Cancún, Dallas/Fort Worth, Denver, Fort Lauderdale, Houston–Intercontinental, Las Vegas, Los Angeles, Miami, New Orleans, New York–LaGuardia, Orlando, Philadelphia, Phoenix–Sky Harbor, Raleigh/Durham
JetBlue	Boston, Fort Lauderdale, New York–JFK
Lufthansa	Frankfurt
Royal Jordanian	Amman–Queen Alia
Southwest Airlines	Austin (begins March 11, 2027), Baltimore, Chicago–Midway, Dallas-Love (begins March 11, 2027), Denver, Las Vegas, Nashville, St. Louis; Seasonal: Orlando, Phoenix–Sky Harbor, Tampa
Sun Country Airlines	Seasonal: Minneapolis/St. Paul
Turkish Airlines	Istanbul
United Airlines	Chicago–O'Hare, Denver, Houston–Intercontinental, San Francisco; Seasonal: Newark
United Express	Chicago–O'Hare, Houston–Intercontinental, Newark, Washington–Dulles
Volaris	Guadalajara
WestJet	Seasonal: Calgary, Halifax, Vancouver

== Statistics ==
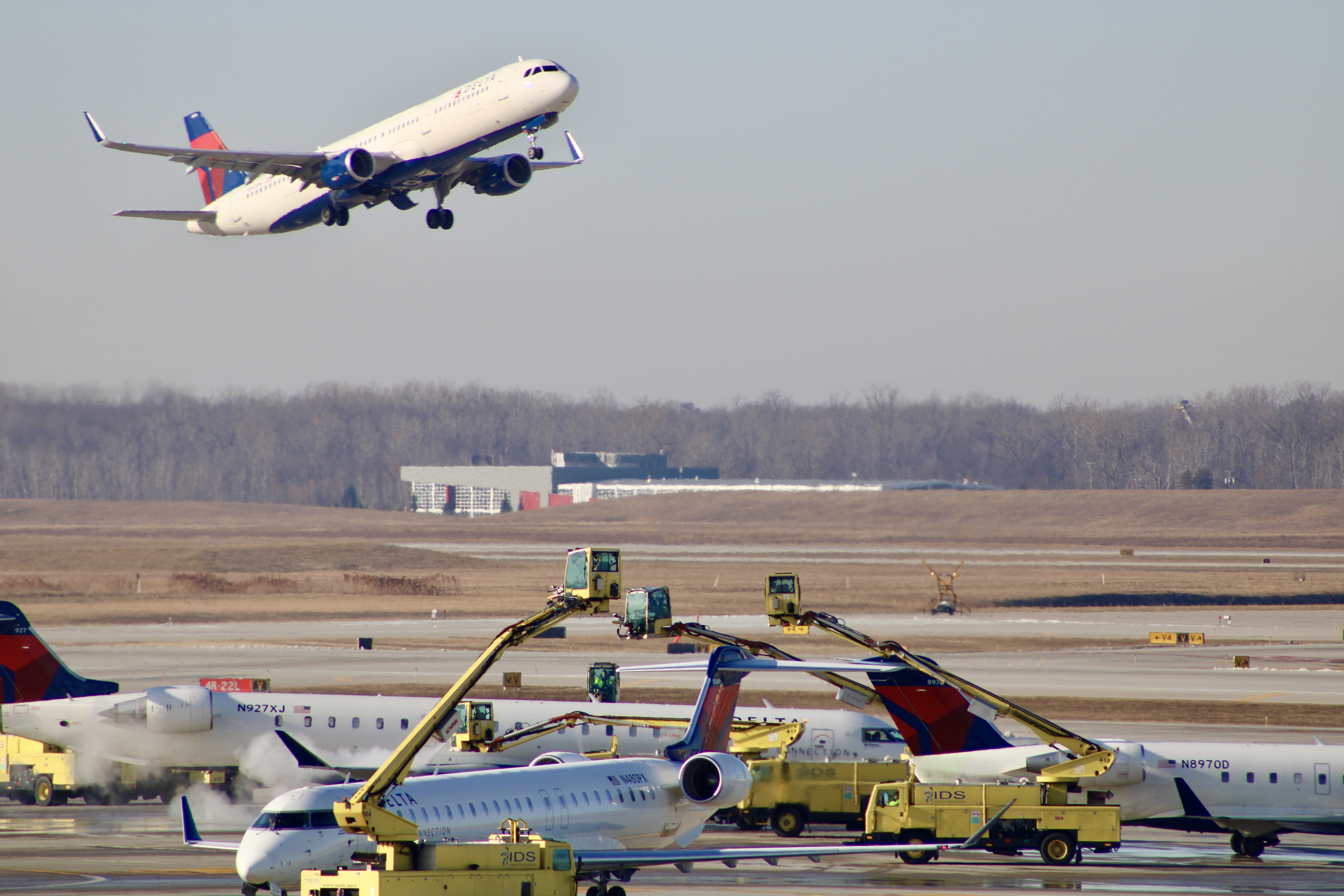
De-icing at DTW with departing Delta A321

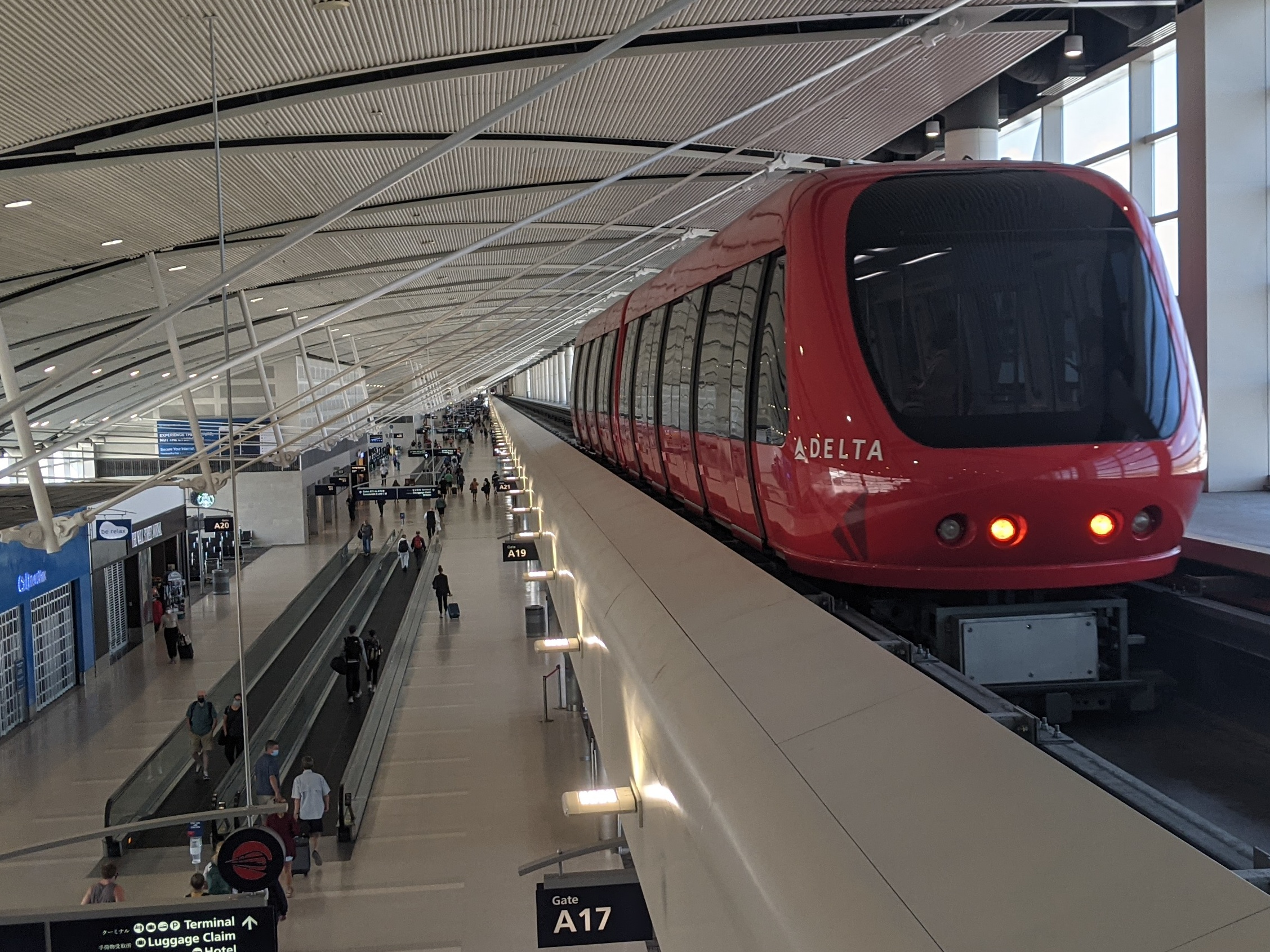
The ExpressTram transports passengers among three stations in the McNamara Terminal.

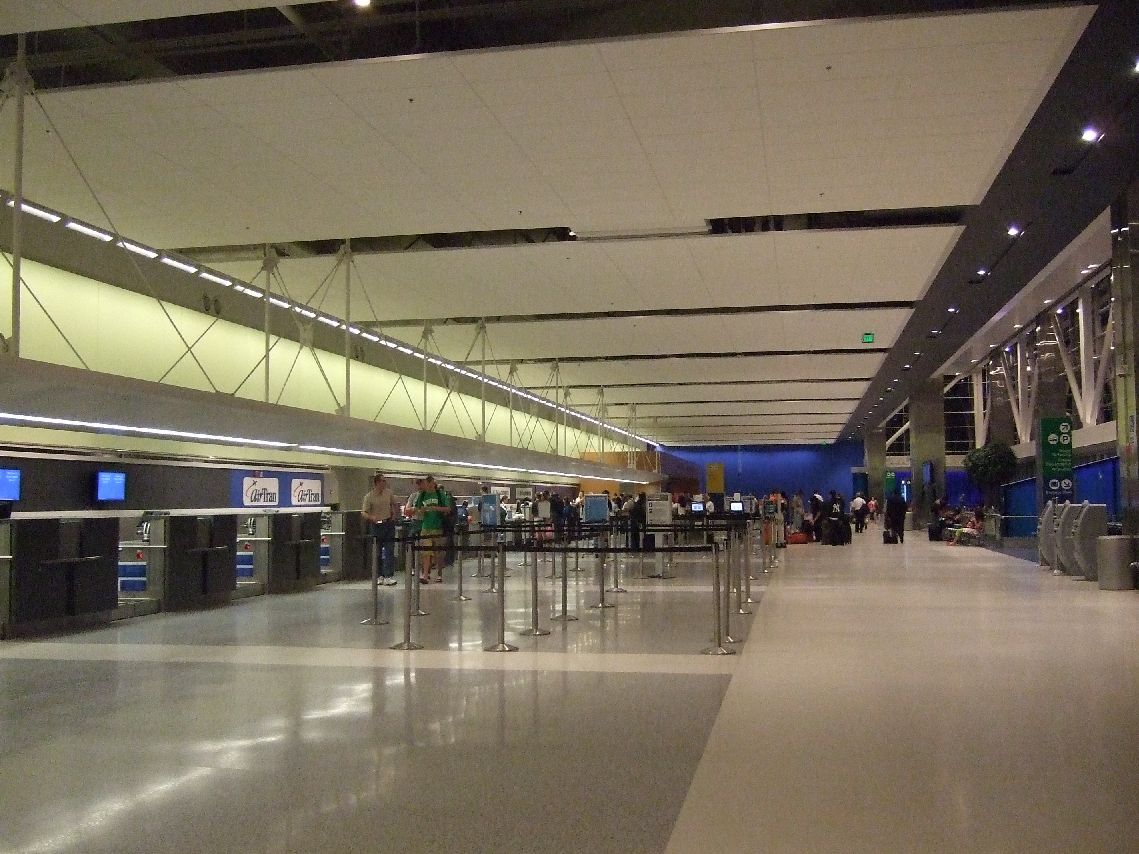
Evans Terminal check-in

=== Top destinations ===
Busiest domestic routes from DTW (September 2025 – August 2026)
Rank	City	Passengers	Carriers
1	Atlanta, Georgia	787,384	Delta, Frontier, Spirit
2	Orlando, Florida	632,245	Delta, Frontier, Southwest, Spirit
3	New York–LaGuardia, New York	463,782	American, Delta, Spirit
4	Dallas/Fort Worth, Texas	457,138	American, Delta, Frontier, Spirit
5	Denver, Colorado	452,673	Delta, Frontier, Southwest, United
6	Las Vegas, Nevada	443,283	Delta, Southwest, Spirit
7	Fort Lauderdale, Florida	431,635	Delta, Frontier, Spirit, JetBlue
8	Chicago–O'Hare, Illinois	412,566	American, Delta, United
9	Phoenix–Sky Harbor, Arizona	394,543	American, Delta, Frontier, Spirit
10	Los Angeles, California	385,540	Delta, Spirit

Busiest international routes from DTW (September 2025 – August 2026)
Rank	Airport	Passengers	Carriers
1	Amsterdam, Netherlands	483,154	Delta
2	Paris–Charles de Gaulle, France	380,278	Air France, Delta
3	Cancún, Mexico	289,888	Delta, Frontier, Spirit
4	Toronto–Pearson, Canada	270,508	Air Canada, Delta
5	Frankfurt, Germany	256,938	Delta, Lufthansa
6	Tokyo–Haneda, Japan	175,762	Delta
7	Seoul-Incheon, South Korea	174,830	Delta
8	London–Heathrow, United Kingdom	169,356	Delta
9	Shanghai-Pudong, China	166,547	Delta
10	Istanbul, Turkey	164,375	Turkish Airlines

=== Airline market share ===
Top airlines at DTW (September 2025 – August 2026)
Rank	Airline	Passengers	Market Share
1	Delta Air Lines	23,721,244	74.3%
2	Spirit Airlines	1,814,822	5.7%
3	American Airlines	1,705,485	5.3%
4	United Airlines	1,116,422	3.5%
5	Southwest Airlines	1,098,766	3.4%
-	Other airlines	2,500,00	7.7%

=== Annual traffic ===
Annual passenger traffic (enplaned + deplaned) at DTW 2000–present
Year	Passengers	Year	Passengers	Year	Passengers
2000	34,900,200	2010	31,529,615	2020	13,729,870
2001	31,739,604	2011	31,572,500	2021	23,114,885
2002	31,066,325	2012	31,380,399	2022	27,608,408
2003	32,173,653	2013	31,588,392	2023	30,854,094
2004	34,613,293	2014	31,761,652	2024	32,352,738
2005	35,626,141	2015	32,718,364	2025	32,700,092
2006	35,462,041	2016	33,893,350	2026	
2007	35,408,262	2017	34,276,034	2027	
2008	34,308,085	2018	35,046,645	2028	
2009	30,679,640	2019	36,439,610	2029	

== Accidents and incidents ==
- December 30, 1963, a Zantop Air Transport C-46 Commando with 4 occupants crashed 2.2 miles SW of DTW, killing all aboard. A loss of control during a night instrument approach in adverse weather was the probable cause.
- June 12, 1972, after a stopover in Detroit, American Airlines Flight 96, a McDonnell Douglas DC-10-10 with 56 passengers and 11 crew from Los Angeles International Airport en route to Buffalo, New York, suffered a cargo door failure and explosive decompression shortly after departure from Detroit Metropolitan Airport while flying over Windsor, Ontario. It is thus sometimes referred to as the Windsor incident. The aircraft sustained damage that left the pilots without full flight controls but the plane returned to Detroit for a successful emergency landing. There were no fatalities but several serious to minor injuries.
- July 31, 1972, Delta Air Lines Flight 841; members of the Black Liberation Army took over the airplane in flight using weapons smuggled on board, including a Bible, cut out to hold a handgun. The plane held seven crew and 94 passengers, none of whom was killed during the hijacking. Five hijackers who had boarded with three children took over the plane. The plane flew to Miami, where the passengers were exchanged for $1 million in ransom. The plane was then flown on to Boston, where it refueled before flying to Algeria. Algeria seized the plane and ransom, which they returned to the U.S., but the hijackers were released after a few days.
- December 15, 1972, a Zantop International Airlines Learjet 23, a ferry flight, crashed after failing to climb from runway 3R, hitting a fuel storage tank. Both occupants on board and one on the ground were killed. Cause undetermined.
- January 19, 1979, a Learjet 25 operated by Massey Ferguson rolled violently and crashed on approach to runway 09. The probable causes were icing, wake vortex by a preceding McDonnell Douglas DC-9 and a delayed application of engine thrust during an attempted go-around. All six occupants (two crew, four passengers) were killed.
- On April 4, 1979, TWA Flight 841 (1979) went into a dive above Saginaw, Michigan. The flight made an emergency landing at DTW.
- January 11, 1983, United Airlines Flight 2885, a McDonnell Douglas DC-8F cargo flight with 3 occupants aboard crashed after takeoff due to a mistrimmed stabilizer causing a loss of control, all on board were killed.
- March 4, 1987, Northwest Airlink Flight 2268, operated by Fischer Brothers Aviation, a CASA 212 was on a scheduled flight from Mansfield to Detroit with an intermediate stop in Cleveland when it crashed while landing at Detroit Metropolitan Wayne County Airport. The plane yawed violently to the left about 70 feet (21 m) above the runway, skidded to the right, hit three ground support vehicles in front of Concourse F, and caught fire. Of 19 occupants onboard (16 passengers and three crew), nine were killed. The cause of the crash was determined to be pilot error.
- August 16, 1987, a McDonnell Douglas MD-82 operating as Northwest Airlines Flight 255, bound for Phoenix, Arizona, crashed on take-off from Metro's 8,500-foot-long (2,600 m) Runway 3 Center (Now Runway 3L). All but one passenger on the aircraft as well as two people on the ground were killed; the lone survivor was a young girl, Cecelia Cichan, who lost both of her parents and her brother. The NTSB determined that the accident resulted from flight crew's failure to deploy the aircraft's flaps prior to take-off, resulting in a lack of necessary lift. The aircraft slammed into an overpass bridge on I-94 just northeast of the departure end of the runway.
- December 3, 1990, a McDonnell Douglas DC-9-14 operating as Northwest Airlines Flight 1482, bound for Pittsburgh, collided with a Boeing 727-200 Adv. operating as Northwest Airlines Flight 299, bound for Memphis, on runway 03C. Seven passengers and a flight attendant on Flight 1482 were killed. The cause of the accident is listed as "pilot error".
- January 9, 1997, an Embraer EMB 120 Brasilia aircraft operating as Comair Flight 3272 crashed nose down 18 miles (29 km) from the airport while on approach into Detroit. All 26 passengers and 3 crew members were killed. The cause is listed to be the "FAA's failure to establish adequate aircraft certification standards for flight in icing conditions, the FAA's failure to ensure that an FAA/CTA-approved procedure for the accident airplane's deice system operation was implemented by U.S.-based air carriers, and the FAA's failure to require the establishment of adequate minimum airspeeds for icing conditions."
- March 17, 2001, an Airbus A320-200 operating as Northwest Airlines Flight 985 bound for Miami, Florida, prematurely rotated during takeoff from runway 3C. The captain aborted the takeoff, and the aircraft skidded off the runway. All 151 occupants survived. The cause of the accident was the captain's delayed rejection of the takeoff, and the flight crew had incorrectly set the trim of the horizontal stabilizer.
- December 25, 2009, Nigerian national Umar Farouk Abdulmutallab attempted to detonate an explosive device on Northwest Airlines Flight 253, an Airbus A330 from Amsterdam to Detroit as the plane was approaching Detroit. The device failed to go off correctly, and the suspect suffered burns to his lower body. Three other passengers had minor injuries. The White House said it considered the incident an attempted terrorist attack.

== See also ==
- Bishop International Airport
- Detroit Region Aerotropolis
- List of airports with triple takeoff/landing capability
- Michigan World War II Army Airfields
- Selfridge Air National Guard Base
- United States v. Mendenhall
- Windsor International Airport
