= The Cartoonist =

- Directed by: Ken Mills
- Written by: Ken Mills
- Based on: Bone by Jeff Smith
- Produced by: Ken Mills; Cameron James
- Narrated by: Beth Emery
- Cinematography: Scott Myers; Jason Hambach; James McCullars; Andy Marshall; Mike Meyer
- Edited by: Mike Meyer; Ken Mills; Jeff Drake
- Production company: Mills James Productions
- Release date: May 22, 2009
- Running time: 76 minutes
- Country: United States
- Language: English

The Cartoonist: Jeff Smith, Bone and the Changing Face of Comics is a 2009 documentary about the life and art of Jeff Smith, the creator of the Bone comic series and described as one of America's greatest living cartoonists. The feature-length film is by American director Ken Mills and was produced by Mills James Productions.

The Cartoonist has been released for international distribution on DVD.

== Synopsis ==
The Cartoonist tells the inspiring story of Jeff Smith's creation of the epic comic book, Bone, hailed by Time magazine as "one of the ten greatest graphic novels of all time".

Fellow cartoonists Scott McCloud, Colleen Doran, Harvey Pekar, Paul Pope and Terry Moore, as well as friends, associates, experts and Jeff himself, share their stories of this worldwide phenomenon that began in small comics shops and is now found in bookstores, schools, libraries and the homes of millions of adults and children in 25 countries. In addition to discussing Jeff's early years, influences and philosophies, the film provides a look at a unique industry and art form that continues to change and evolve.

== Release ==
The Cartoonist: Jeff Smith, Bone and the Changing Face of Comics made its world premiere on May 22, 2009 at the Wexner Center for the Arts on the campus of Ohio State University. The premiere was part of the Visiting Filmmakers series, where rising stars and acclaimed masters come to screen their films and talk with Wexner Center audiences. The event was co-sponsored by Ohio State’s Cartoon Library & Museum.

== Reception ==
The documentary was well received by critics. It was recommended as a "steller program" by Booklist, and others suggested that it may prove a useful resource for students researching the creative writing process. The film has been lauded as "essential viewing for comics fans", although one review described it as "more mash note than journalism".
