= Conrad Reid =

American politician

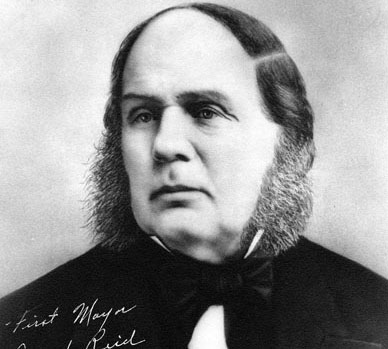

1st Mayor of the City of Lorain
- In office April 6, 1874 – October 7, 1875
- Preceded by: none
- Succeeded by: Thomas Gawn

Personal details
- Born: September 30, 1802 Wilkes Barre, Pennsylvania
- Died: March 24, 1883 (aged 80)

Conrad Reid (September 30, 1802 – March 24, 1883) was a nineteenth-century American businessman, government official and politician who served as the first mayor of Lorain, Ohio.

== Formative years ==
Born in Wilkes-Barre, Pennsylvania on September 30, 1802, Red was a son of John S. Reid, a native of New Jersey, and Anna Reid. He relocated with his family to Cleveland, Ohio circa 1806, and from Cleveland to Black River in the spring of 1811. In 1823, he wed Abigail Murdock. They became the parents of eleven sons and one daughter before he was widowed by Abigail on April 10, 1861. He then married a second time, on Christmas Day 1862 to German immigrant Catharine Horn, who had emigrated from Hesse-Kassel.

== Public service career ==
In 1874, Reid was elected as the first mayor of the newly incorporated village (city) of Lorain, Ohio (founded as 'Black River village' by his father, John S. Reid). Conrad served as the village's Postmaster in 1835, and he built a two-story hotel called the Reid House that same year. (His father had also operated an earlier log-structure "Reid House" inn/tavern, nearby.) Conrad was appointed a U.S. Marshal during the Civil War. He resigned from office of mayor on October 7, 1875. The Reid House hotel burned down one month after Conrad Reid's death.
