= List of mayors of Lorain, Ohio =

This is a list of mayors of the city of Lorain.

#	Began term	Ended term	Mayor
1	April 6, 1874	October 7, 1875	Conrad Reid
2	October 7, 1875	October 29, 1875	Thomas Gawn
3	October 29, 1875	July 24, 1876	Henry S. Rockwood
4	July 24, 1876	August 15, 1876	F.W. Edison
5	August 15, 1876	August 27, 1877	Gustavus Vasa Bayley
6	August 27, 1877	October 16, 1877	F.W. Edison
7	October 16, 1887	April 1878	Frank B. Vernam
8	April 1878	April 1879	Thaddeus W. Fancher
9	April 1879	September 7, 1880	Frank Hogan
10	September 7, 1880	April 1881	A.R. Fitzgerald
11	April 5, 1881	April 1884	G.J. Clark
12	April 1884	April 1886	F.W. Edison
13	April 1886	April 1888	Otto Braun
14	April 1888	April 1890	Allison H. Babcock
15	April 1890	April 1894	W.B. Thompson
16	April 1894	January 15, 1896	George Wickins
17	January 15, 1896	April 1896	Charles N. Snyder
18	April 1896	April 1898	John B. Coffinberry
19	April 1898	April 1900	Allison H. Babcock
20	April 1900	April 1902	George L. Glitsch
21	April 1902	April 1908	F.J. King
22	January 1908	January 1910	A.A. King
23	January 1910	January 1912	F.J. King
24	January 1912	January 1914	T.W. Pape (S)
25	January 1914	January 1916	J.J. Pollock
26	January 1916	January 1918	Leonard M. Moore
27	January 1918	January 1920	Albert J. Horn
28	January 1920	January 1924	W.F. Grall
29	January 1924	August 15, 1925	George Hoffman
30	August 15, 1925	January 1926	H.D. Walters
31	January 1926	January 1928	W.F. Grall
32	January 1928	January 1930	J.C. Standen
33	January 1930	January 1932	Paul J. Goldthorpe
34	January 1932	January 1934	Joseph Conley
35	January 1934	January 1938	Edward A. Braun
36	January 1938	November 25, 1938	George P. Bretz
37	November 25, 1938	January 1940	A. Matuszak
38	January 1940	January 1946	H.G. Van Wagnen
39	January 1946	January 1952	P.J. Flaherty
40	January 1952	January 1962	J.C. Jaworski (D)
41	January 1962	January 1972	W.W. Mathna (R)
42	January 1972	January 1980	Joseph J. Zahorec (D)
43	January 1980	January 1984	William Parker (R)
44	January 1984	December 31, 1984	Joseph J. Zahorec (D)
45	January 1985	January 2, 1996	Alex M. Olejko (D)
46	January 3, 1996	January 2000	Joseph Koziura (D)
47	January 2000	August 1, 2007	Craig Foltin (R)
48	September 2007	December 2007	John Romoser (R)
49	January 2008	December 2011	Anthony Krasienko (D)
50	January 2012	May 2019	Chase Ritenauer (D)
51	May 2019	June 2019	Joel Arredondo (D)
52	June 2019	December 31, 2019	Joseph Koziura (D)
53	January 1, 2020	present	Jack Bradley (D)
