= Ohio Vax-A-Million =

Lottery for COVID-19 vaccine recipients in Ohio

The Ohio Vax-A-Million logo.

The Ohio Vax-A-Million was a weekly lottery held every Wednesday from May 26 through June 23, 2021, by the Ohio Lottery and the Ohio Department of Health to award Ohioans who have received at least one dose of the COVID-19 vaccine. Weekly prizes include $1 million ($1.2 million today), and for those who are minors a full-ride scholarship to any four-year public university in Ohio. The contest, which was designed to encourage those who may be more hesitant to get the vaccine, received national headlines and drew some debate over the legality of such a lottery.

== Background ==
The U.S. state of Ohio was among the first states in the United States that shut everything down at the beginning of the COVID-19 pandemic, giving Ohio Governor Mike DeWine and then-health director Amy Acton both praise and criticism for their swift response, as Ohio's outbreak of COVID-19 over the long-term was small compared to other states, especially with Ohio's relatively large population (ranked 7th nationally) compared to states of similar geographic size.

On May 12, 2021, DeWine announced he was lifting all health orders as of June 2. This included the wearing of face masks in accordance with updated guidelines from the Centers for Disease Control. Around the same time, the administering of the COVID-19 vaccine had started to level off to the point where supply was greater than demand, even with walk-in appointments becoming the norm for the vaccine. Therefore, during the same press conference when DeWine announced he was lifting all health orders June 2, he also announced the Ohio Vax-A-Million contest. As part of the contest, five Ohioans aged 18 years or older would be selected individually over a five-week period would be rewarded $1 million as long as they had been vaccinated at least once.

As with all other states with a state lottery, the Ohio Lottery normally only issues prizes to those aged 18 or older. As vaccines are being issued to those as young as 12, the Ohio Lottery decided to make an exception for minors. Instead of being awarded money, those who have been vaccinated that are aged 12-17 would be rewarded with a full-ride scholarship to any four-year public university in Ohio of their choice up to a Bachelor's degree.

The funding for the contest is coming from a surplus of Ohio's portion of the CARES Act to educate the general public about the COVID-19 vaccines that are required to be spent on such programs. After debate on whether or not such a lottery would be considered taxable, it was decided that it would count towards income tax, and a Form 1099 will be issued from the Ohio Lottery to each winner.

DeWine stated in an editorial that he himself created the initial design of the contest after hearing a suggestion from his chief adviser.

== Eligibility ==
All permanent Ohio residents aged 18 or older who have received at least one vaccination by the Sunday prior to each drawing were eligible, while meeting other eligibility requirements. Initially, Ohio planned to have the entrants names pulled from the voter registration list with non-voters having to register on a separate website. However, on May 17, it was announced that all Ohio residents would be required to register on the site or by phone, while also giving those who don't want to participate an option to opt-out. Convicted felons as well as employees of the Ohio Lottery and the Ohio Department of Health (and respective family members from both agencies) are not eligible to participate. Minors registering for the scholarships were allowed to register on their own, but their parents or legal guardian would be required to verify their information.

Each entrant is only required to register once, with the registration system automatically deleting multiple entries from the same person. It also asks where the individual received their COVID-19 vaccination, giving the Ohio Department of Health permission to verify with the pharmacy or health care provider that the individual had been vaccinated. The drawings are being done two days before they are announced as to give the Ohio Department of Health time to verify a potential winner's vaccination. Ohio residents are not required to have received their vaccine in Ohio, but it does require that residents be "permanent" residents, and would use the same requirements issued by the Ohio Bureau of Motor Vehicles for driver's licenses or vehicle registrations.

== Response and criticism ==
Less than a week after the announcement, the vaccination rate in Ohio, which had been stagnant, started to climb back up. Some proponents of the lottery have said that the giveaway has helped Ohio approach herd immunity faster by giving residents an incentive to get vaccinated. Ohio received national attention for the lottery, becoming the state with the largest monetary incentive for vaccination at the time the program was implemented.

However, the lottery has received its fair share of criticism, including a debate over the legality of using federal funds to fund a lottery.

Since the introduction of Vax-A-Million, several other U.S. states have created similar contests, including Colorado, New York, California, Oregon, New Mexico, West Virginia and Maryland, as well as the Canadian provinces of Manitoba, Alberta and Quebec. Ohio itself introduced Vax-2-School, with the incentive of higher education scholarships, on September 23, 2021.

A study by researchers at the Boston University School of Medicine suggests that Vax-a-Million and similar lotteries "are of limited value in increasing vaccine uptake." However, a later study by researchers at the Institute for Applied Computational Science at the Harvard John A. Paulson School of Engineering and Applied Sciences states that "[a]n additional 114,553 individuals received vaccinations as a result of Ohio's vaccine lottery at a cost of approximately $49 per Ohioan vaccinated."
