= Mills James =

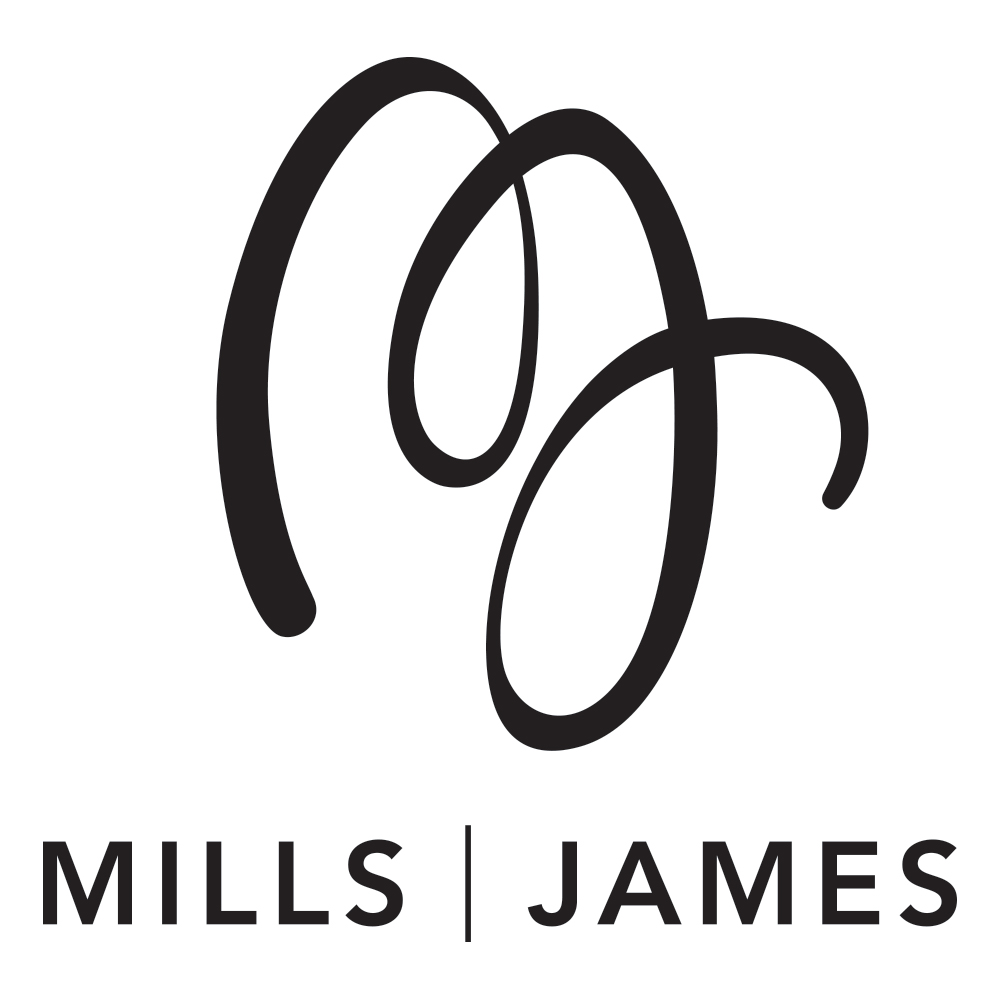
- Type: Private
- Industry: Creative media
- Founded: Incorporated May 1, 1984
- Founder: Ken Mills and Cameron James
- Headquarters: Columbus, Ohio, USA
- Key people: Ken Mills, Chairman of the Board; Cameron James, CEO; Arthur James, President; Scott Lanum, COO
- Products: Corporate video, documentaries, original broadcast programming, commercials, digital signage, corporate meetings and events
- Number of employees: 180
- Website: millsjames.com

Mills James is a creative media production company in Columbus, Cleveland and Cincinnati, Ohio that creates and produces broadcast programming and documentaries, corporate and institutional video and film projects, infomercials, television commercials, digital signage and corporate meetings and special events. Additional services include webcasts and webinars and digital distribution and transmission services.

Mills James has a staff of 180 people whose training and experience cover the creative, electronic and theatrical production disciplines. They include producers, directors, writers, special events experts, set designers and builders, music composers, graphic artists and animators, video editors, audio engineers, and support personnel.

The Columbus Teleproduction Center houses studios; editing, audio and visual effects suites; control and engineering centers; creative services; and administrative and business support functions.

In the Westbelt complex, nearby, is the operations center for the Mills James Experience Group [MJx], the meetings and events group - housing the company's inventory of lighting, audio, projection and AV equipment, as well as its logistical support staff, scene shop and transportation fleet.

Mills James' Cincinnati operation serves its corporate and advertising clients in the southwestern Ohio/northern Kentucky area with a staff of producers, event specialists, videographers, editors, graphics designers and technicians.

Mills James' Cleveland facilities are located in the historic Bradley Building in the Warehouse District downtown, and include studio, video editing and fiber optic digital transmission operations for broadcast programming and news feeds.

== Productions ==
Mills James produces commercials, original television productions, documentaries, infomercials, news feeds, corporate videos, mobile apps and special events for companies and organizations including Victoria's Secret, Ohio State University, Procter & Gamble, Nationwide Insurance, Fox News and Scotts Miracle-Gro Company.

Several Mills James half-hour television series are currently airing on TV stations around the country. The Piano Guy with Scott Houston, a multiple Emmy Award-winning how-to program, airs nationally on public television, and C.E., the Ohio Lottery’s weekly game show, is broadcast Saturday evenings on a 12-station statewide network. Mills James also telecasts The Ohio Lottery daily game drawings live from its Cleveland studio operation.

The Mills James film The Cartoonist, is a feature-length documentary about the life and work of Jeff Smith, creator of the graphic novel series, Bone.

== Services ==
Mills James practices what it terms 'the art and science of modern storytelling,' combining ideas and technology into designed messages for sales and marketing communications, brand management, investor relations, change management, employee communications and public relations.

Mills James' services include:

- Concepting and design
- Post production and visual effects
- Studio and location production
- Audio production and custom music
- Digital signage
- Meetings and live events

== History ==
Mills James began in May, 1984, when Ken Mills and Cameron James opened their office in the Canterbury building on Olentangy River Road, just north of the Ohio State University main campus. With the addition of staff and equipment, they quickly outgrew the space.

In late 1985, Mills James bought its first building, the former Beechwold Public Library on North High Street. Extra space on the lower level was occupied by another fledgling company, Character Builders, a cel animation firm.

In 1988, Mills James acquired the audio and video facilities and staff of the production division of Discovery Systems, moving into Discovery's building off Post Road in Dublin. This acquisition more than doubled the size of the firm. Shortly afterward, the company began searching for larger quarters, a location which would accommodate larger studios for film and video shoots, out of airplane flight paths to eliminate unwanted noise in the studios, and would offer room for expansion.

On May 1, 1990, the company’s sixth anniversary, Mills James broke ground for construction of the first phase of its present facility on Fishinger Boulevard, a 25,000-square-foot (2,300 m^{2}) building on 3.3 acres (13,000 m^{2}) in the Mill Run development. The Teleproduction Center was completed in November 1990.

In 1992, Mills/James was named Ohio Small Business of the Year by the U.S. Small Business Administration, honored at ceremonies in Washington, D.C. A year later, Ken Mills and Cameron James were recognized with Entrepreneur of the Year awards, sponsored by Ernst & Young.

By 1995, with over 50 associates on staff, Mills James had begun to outgrow its original building and began construction on a 22,000 square feet (2,000 m^{2}) addition to the original building. The new space included its signature two-story glass atrium, additional editing and visual effects suites, a presentation theater and a media vault. The addition opened in December with a reception honoring radio and television veterans of the 1950s and '60s. In 2003, Mills James became the home for production of The Ohio Lottery's Cash Explosion weekly television game show, which had been produced in Cleveland since the program's inception.

In 2005, Mills James purchased a 20,000-square-foot (1,900 m^{2}) building on 2.5 acres (10,000 m^{2}) in the Westbelt complex off Roberts Road, west of I-270, to house the technical facilities of its meetings and events group. In 2006, a building expansion enclosed the loading docks and added space for a scene shop and set storage.

In 2007, the company announced the formation of its Employee Stock Option Plan [ESOP] which would transfer partial ownership of the firm to its associates.

In February, 2010, Mills James expanded its Cincinnati operation to better serve its clients in the tri-state region (southwestern Ohio, southeastern Indiana and northern Kentucky.) The firm added staff and facilities to offer more video, broadcast, audio and corporate meeting and special event services.

In 2011, Mills James undertook a year-long expansion and upgrade of its teleproduction facilities including construction of a third studio and two additional editing suites as well as upgrades to its video transmission, compression and live event capabilities. Later in the year, Mills James expanded its digital signage services with the launch of VitalSigns, a digital signage solution that combines hardware, message creation, content managagment and long term support into a single service.

In 2013, Mills James opened its Cleveland operation, with studio, video editing and digital fiber optic video transmission facilities designed for broadcast programming and news feeds. It is home to The Ohio Lottery's daily drawings broadcasts, which are carried by a statewide network of television stations.

Today, Mills James is 100% employee-owned, managed by a board of directors.
