= Dan Ramos =

American politician (1981–2023)

Member of the Ohio House of Representatives from the 56th district
- In office January 3, 2011 – January 6, 2019
- Preceded by: Joseph Koziura
- Succeeded by: Joe Miller

Personal details
- Born: September 2, 1981 Oberlin, Ohio, U.S.
- Died: January 28, 2023 (aged 41)
- Party: Democratic
- Education: Ohio State University
- Profession: Legislator

Dan Ramos (September 2, 1981 – January 28, 2023) was an American politician who was a member of the Ohio House of Representatives for the 56th District, serving from January, 2011 to January, 2019. He was a member of the Democratic Party.

== Career ==
A lifetime Lorain resident and graduate of Lorain Admiral King High School, Ramos went on to study political science at the Ohio State University. Ramos spent his early career as a policy analyst and legislative aide for Joseph Koziura and Speaker Armond Budish. Along with his time as a policy analyst, he also worked the political front throughout Lorain County.

== Ohio House of Representatives ==
With incumbent Joseph Koziura unable to run again, Ramos sought to replace him. However, he faced two other Democrats for the nomination. He went on to win the nomination with 34.63% of the vote. In the general election, Ramos defeated Republican Henry "Skip" Lewandowski with 67.67% of the vote.

Ramos was sworn into his first term on January 3, 2011. Ramos served on the committees of Finance and Appropriations; Commerce and Labor; Health and Aging; and the Health and Aging Subcommittee on Retirement and Pensions. Ramos also served as Ranking Member to the Finance and Appropriations Subcommittee on Higher Education. In addition, Ramos has served as a member of the Ohio School Facilities Commission, the Ohio Commission on Hispanic/Latino Affairs, as well as the Ohio Retirement Study Council.

Ramos won a second term in 2012 unopposed. In May, 2013, Ramos was selected by his colleagues in the House to serve as Assistant Minority Whip. His selection to House leadership represents the first time a person of Latino descent has served in such a role in either chamber of the Ohio General Assembly.

=== Positions and initiatives ===
Ramos was critical of Governor John Kasich's lack of diversity in his cabinet. The first person of Puerto Rican heritage elected to the General Assembly, he said nearly one in five persons in Ohio is an ethnic minority. "I wish the governor well, as his successes are my successes, and much more importantly, are the successes of my constituents. Whether black or white, Hispanic or Asian, Native American, Pacific Islander, native born or immigrant, gay or hetero, male or female, Ohio is home to all of us. I'm here today to make certain that the voices of all Ohio's people are heard so we can all move forward together," Rep. Ramos said.

Ramos was also critical of a bill pertaining to the elimination of collective bargaining for public employees. Ramos said the working class and union workers are Ohio’s “economic growth, which is what we need.” The bill passed out of the legislature, but Ramos believes that the majority of individuals will vote on a referendum against the bill.

In regards to a remarks by Todd McKenney that he voted for an abortion bill that he thought was unconstitutional, Ramos told his colleagues that if they believe a bill is unconstitutional, they are obligated not to enact it.

== Personal life and death ==
Ramos died on January 28, 2023, at the age of 41.
