= Scott Houston (musician) =

Scott Houston, also known as the Piano Guy, is an American pianist, author, teacher, and television personality who hosted and co-produced the public television series The Piano Guy. Houston is also the performer on a public television pledge special titled Play Piano in a Flash, and developed the "Piano in a Flash Online Method", aimed at teaching piano to adults.

== The Piano Guy ==
The Piano Guy is a half-hour instructional television series broadcast on public broadcasting stations across the US and Canada. The show was produced from the studios of Mills James Productions in Columbus, Ohio. Houston has received six in the categories of (Interview-Discussion Program & Host-Moderator-narrator Emmy Awards as Host/Moderator), and the show itself has received two Emmy Awards for production and graphics for a total of 8 Emmy Awards for "The Piano Guy" weekly public TV series. Over 180 episodes were produced while in production over 14 seasons. It offers demonstrations and advice on playing piano informally at various skill levels, with an emphasis on learning to play familiar tunes.
