= Cash Explosion =

American lottery television show

- Also known as: Cash Explosion (Double Play); C.E.
- Genre: Game show
- Presented by: Bob Grossi; Paul Tapié; Michael Armstrong; Michele Duda; David McCreary; Sharon Bicknell; Leilani Barrett; Cherie McClain; Alissa Henry; Special Correspondent: Barb McCann; Lottery Drawing Hosts: Karen Harris; Bob Becker; Karen Kawolics; Eric Parks; Cherie McClain; Sharon Bicknell; David Sagilia
- Announcer: Tom Bush; Jim Pitcock; John E. Douglas; David McCreary; Cherie McClain
- Country of origin: United States
- Original language: English
- No. of episodes: 1,511

Production
- Production locations: Cleveland, Ohio (game show and drawings 1987-2003; drawings only 2004-2026); Columbus, Ohio (2004-present; drawings held in Columbus since October 2026)
- Running time: 24 minutes (this includes the lottery drawings and contestant announcements)
- Production companies: Mills James Productions; Ohio Lottery

Original release
- Network: Regionally syndicated throughout Ohio; Nationally on YouTube
- Release: February 7, 1987 – September 30, 2006
- Release: October 6, 2007 – present

Cash Explosion (or simply C.E. since 2017), known as Cash Explosion: Double Play from 1989 until 2012, is the official Ohio Lottery TV game show, which is broadcast on television stations throughout Ohio. The show originated in Cleveland and is now taped by Mills James Productions in Columbus, Ohio along with the lottery drawings.

Cash Explosion originally aired from February 7, 1987, to September 30, 2006, at which point the Ohio Lottery replaced it with Make Me Famous, Make Me Rich. However, slumping ticket sales and poor ratings prompted the return of the Cash Explosion format a year later, on October 6, 2007, and it has remained on the air since.

Cash Explosion is the longest-running state lottery based game show, surpassing California's The Big Spin, which ended its run on January 10, 2009, after 23 years and 1,213 episodes. As of September 27, 2014, Cash Explosion has run for 26 years and 1,433 episodes.

As of 2016, Cash Explosion is the only weekly lottery game show airing in the United States.

== Hosts ==
Bob Grossi (then a weather anchor at WBNS-TV in Columbus, Ohio) was the original host, and was replaced in 1988 by Cleveland radio personality Paul Tapié. Tapié left the show for a few months in 2000. During this, Safe Auto spokesman Michael Armstrong took over. Sharon Bicknell was the co-host from the beginning until February 2004, returning in 2007 until the present. Michelle Duda and Leilani Barrett took over as hosts in February 2004, and remained through the end of the first run. Regular lottery drawing hosts Karen Harris and Bob Becker (deceased) substituted on various occasions. John E. Douglas (Cleveland) has the longest run as the "off stage announcer" from 1989 until 2006; Douglas died in July 2016. Beneatha Barkley joined the lottery host rotation in April 2003 and remained until October, when she was replaced by Karen Kawolics. Cherie McClain joined the lottery drawing hosting team in 2006.

Following its October 2007 return, David McCreary, a comedy magician who had previously hosted Make Me Famous, Make Me Rich, became the new host with Bicknell returning, and McClain also joining the cast. Becker, Harris and Kawlolics served as rotating lottery drawing hosts until Harris and Becker's retirements in 2008 and 2013 respectively. Eric Parks replaced the retired hosts at the beginning of 2014 and served until 2019.

Barb McCann was Cash Explosion's Special Correspondent from 2007 to 2008. McCann won a contest during the run of Make Me Famous, Make Me Rich in which viewers voted on their favorite co-host among those auditioning.

Following the 30th Anniversary Special in 2017, Alissa Henry (a reporter with WSYX-TV in Columbus) became the new co-host (alongside McCreary), replacing both Bicknell and McClain, who both became rotating lottery drawing hosts. At the same time, the series alternatively began to be called C.E., while McCreary, Henry, and the lottery drawing hosts began alternating as announcer. David Saglila replaced Parks in 2020.

== First format (1987–1989) ==
=== First round ===
Seven contestants, each of whom submitted a Cash Explosion scratchcard ticket with three matching "ENTRY" symbols, competed in a race to reach the top of an eleven-step pyramid in order to win $50,000. The losing contestants were each given $1,000.

Each contestant had a box of cards in front of them, numbered –2 to 3, with no zero cards. On their turn each contestant drew a card, then moved up or down the pyramid by the number of spaces indicated. The first person to land on the final square by exact count won $50,000. If a contestant returned to the start line at any point in the game, they were eliminated from the game.

In every contestant's track was a randomly designated bonus square. Landing on it gave the contestant the option to leave the game and take a new car or stay in the game. Regardless of their decision, once two bonus squares had been revealed, all other bonus squares were voided.

Toward the end of this format, each contestant was staked $1,000. For each legitimate move up or down the track, the contestant won/lost $50 (i.e., a 2 was worth $100 in addition to moving up the track 2 spaces; a –2 decreased their score by $100). Still later, moving up or down was worth $100 per move. Reaching the goal augmented the contestant's total to $50,000, while the others could keep their cash or trade it away for a spin of the wheel in the second round. Those eliminated by penalty still received $1,000.

=== Second round ===
The contestants who had not been eliminated during the course of the game, whether by choice (with the bonus squares) or by penalty, were eligible to trade their winnings and spin a wheel containing various amounts of cash (originally cash and prizes from a differently-built wheel). The odds of spinning something worth more than $1,000 were high, so contestants often spun the wheel.

== Second format (1989–2006; 2007–2017) ==
=== Semifinal game ===
==== Cash Explosion Double Play (1989–2009) ====
Four people competed in the Semifinal game. The contestants faced a 24-space game board with six columns of four rows. The columns were labeled D-O-U-B-L-E and the rows labeled P-L-A-Y. On a contestant's turn, the columns randomly flashed and the contestant pressed their button to stop the lights on a column, then picked one of the four rows in that column, winning whatever money was behind the space represented by that combination.

The values on the board ranged from $250 to $3,200. Early in the show's run, the $250 amount was removed making the minimum $1,000. Also on the board were two spaces marked "DOUBLE". If chosen, the contestant received another turn and whatever they land on was doubled; if the second pick was also a double, the contestant received a third turn, quadrupling the money found. The third special square was a “BONUS” card, which not only contained a money amount, but also a bonus prize (originally a new car, later $25,000). Originally the contestant had to choose whether he or she wanted the bonus (dropping out of further play if they took it) or the money. However, by 1993, contestants were simply awarded both the car and the hidden cash amount.

From 2000 to 2004, a second bonus prize was added to the board featuring four years of prepaid tuition at any four-year college or university in Ohio, along with extra cash added to make the prize worth $20,000. This was later replaced with Ohio Lottery tickets attached to a dollar amount. In all cases, like the standard Bonus card, the prize value was not added to the score, but the additional dollar amount hidden behind the bonus card was.

The contestant in the lead after each had three turns won the game, had their score doubled (excluding bonuses), and advanced to the Championship Game. All other contestants left the game with whatever they had won.

In the event of a tie for the lead after three rounds, a tiebreaker round was played. Originally, the tying contestants each picked a playing card from a set of eight, with the highest value card winning. These were later replaced by cash amounts from $100 to $800, again with the highest amount winning.

A second semifinal game was played with four new contestants and a new board with the same rules as the first.

==== 2009–2017 ====
On October 3, 2009, the board was increased to 36 spaces and consisted of nine columns of four rows. The columns were labeled E-X-P-L-O-S-I-O-N and the rows labeled C-A-S-H. The cash amounts ranged from $1,500 to $5,000.

The number of special spaces increased from three to nine, with two $10,000 cash bonus squares, one $25,000 bonus square and six double squares. Every time a contestant hit a double square, as before, he or she received an extra turn. However, after finding a double card the contestant randomly stopped on one of the letters in E-X-P-L-O-S-I-O-N above the game board, revealing a dollar amount between $2,000 and $5,000, which was then doubled and added to their score. Later, a bonus prize was hidden in one of the spaces which contain the same rule as the cash bonuses.

The tiebreaker round had four amounts hidden behind the letters in the word "cash". As before, the highest score won and the contestant advanced to the Cash Challenge.

=== Championship Game/Cash Challenge ===
==== 1989–1993 ====
The two semifinal winners competed against the returning champion. To begin, a target number between 10 and 17 was selected from a randomizer. The contestants then spun a wheel containing numbers from one to nine and an additional space marked "double", attempting to come as close to the target number without going over. If two or three contestants tied, each contestant picked a playing card from a set of eight. The contestant with the highest card won. Originally, the contestants spun three individual wheels (with a ball attached inside each wheel), one for each contestant. Later, this was changed to contestants spinning one wheel.

A first-time champion's winnings were augmented to $50,000, while a two-time champion earned another $50,000 for a total of $100,000. A three-time champion earned another $100,000 for a total of $200,000 and retired from the show.

==== 1993–2017 ====
From 1993 to 2009, the three contestants' names were each hidden three times behind a game board with nine squares total. The contestants took turns selecting squares, uncovering the names behind them. The person whose name was uncovered three times first won the game and the right to return the following week, with the same payout structure for returning champions used from 1989 to 1993.

Beginning October 3, 2009, three cash bonuses totaling $25,000 (two $10,000 spaces and one $5,000 space) were added to the championship game board which now featured a total of twelve spaces. If a contestant selected a bonus space, they won that amount of money and control passes to the next contestant in line. Additionally, contestants no longer retire after winning their third game. First-time champions still won a total of $50,000, two-time winners won $100,000, and three-time winners won $200,000 (bonuses not included). However, a champion won an additional $100,000 for every subsequent week they won thereafter. Champions remained on the show until defeated, with no monetary limits or maximum number of appearances. By 2012, the final round was renamed the "Cash Challenge".

Because the first 2007 show did not have a returning champion (due to the final winner of Make Me Famous, Make Me Rich choosing to keep her earnings and leave), the two semifinal winners played against themselves, with the winner becoming the new returning champion.

As part of the 30th Anniversary season leading up to the XL format, bonus prizes such as vacations, laptops, and gasoline for a year were available under one square in each round.

=== Cash Explosion XL ===
Starting June 3, 2017 and lasting throughout the summer, as part of the 30th Anniversary Celebration, the show modified its format and briefly renamed it Cash Explosion XL. Under this format, 24 contestants participated in each semifinal game in teams of three.

Each contestant took one turn, and all three contestants won whatever total is displayed on the podium. If a double was found, that same contestant hit the button again. If, however, the square chosen revealed a cash bonus, only the contestant who selected the square won the bonus money. One of the co-hosts (Sharon, Cherie, or David) brought out a silver or golden bar with the amount written on it to represent the bonus money.

The Cash Challenge was the same as in the regular version, but only one person from the winning team played. The contestant was chosen via the new "Cash Challenge Qualifier."

==== Cash Challenge Qualifier ====
Nine green squares spelled out the word "CHALLENGE," and each hid a number from one to nine. Each contestant selected one square, and the contestant with the highest number played in the Cash Challenge. That same contestant also had their total doubled.

== Spotlight (2017–2022) ==
A new format debuted on September 2, 2017. The semifinal round features eight contestants playing individually. Each contestant is presented with their own grid of twenty squares, behind which are hidden various money amounts, two double tiles and one bonus tile. The contestant selects three of the twenty squares, and the values associated with each selection is revealed one at a time. Contestants are ranked by the total amount of their three selections. The two contestants with the highest totals have their banks doubled and advance to the Cash Challenge championship round.

If a contestant reveals a double tile, he or she then selects a letter in the word "spotlight", which is positioned above their game board. The value associated with the letter selected is doubled and added to the contestant's bank.

If a contestant reveals the bonus tile, he or she then makes a selection from the bonus board. On the board are sixteen tiles, each labeled with the name of one of the top Ohio Lottery games (including the C.E. game, as well as more common games such as Powerball). Hidden behind each tile is a bonus cash award worth between $10,000 and $50,000, or in earlier episodes, a $5,000 bonus attached to an instant trip to the Cash Challenge championship round. The contestant makes a selection and wins the associated bonus; however, this amount is not added to the contestant's bank in terms of scoring purposes. Also attached to each tile is a second cash award which is added to the bank.

In the later section, a Second Chance round is used to determine a fourth contestant in the Cash Challenge. Each of the 6 contestants that did not make it to the top 2 gets to choose a letter from the phrase "SECOND CHANCE"(each letter hiding a random number from 1–12) and whoever's chosen letter has the highest number attached to it gets $5,000 added to their bank and advances to the Cash Challenge.

The Cash Challenge is played as before, but with a fourth contestant, with the contestant whose name is revealed three times becoming or continuing as champion; however, no more bonus money is present.

=== C.E. Play at Home ===
From May 2020 to August 2021, C.E. suspended tapings due to the COVID-19 pandemic in Ohio and allows contestants to play at home.

== C.E. (2022–present) ==
The format was overhauled on October 15, 2022. The eight players played one at a time facing one large screen. The main game board now features 24 hexagon tiles: hiding money, one double tile, one triple tile, a bonus tile, an extra play tile, and an Ohio Lottery ticket jackpot (which is the Ohio Lottery logo).

Like in Spotlight, the player selects three tiles on his/her podium. If a player finds a double or triple tile, his/her game board transforms into a multiplier board which the player selects one of nine money related terms (Coins, Bank, Purse, Safe, Cash, Gold, Diamond, Money Tree, and Piggy Bank). Whatever the amount is shown, it is doubled or tripled. If a player finds a bonus tile, he/she is shown the Ohio Lottery win station and selects one of sixteen most popular Ohio Lottery games (including the C.E. game). The Ohio Lottery win station also shows the Retailer of the Week. Once the double/triple and bonus tiles are found, the game board returns to its normal configuration. If a player finds the Ohio Lottery Ticket Jackpot, he/she wins $1,000 worth of Ohio Lottery tickets from a randomly chosen instant game (each audience member over the age of 18 also receives one of the tickets chosen for the ticket jackpot for the week). If a player finds an Extra Play, the game board adds a fourth tile and he/she can make a fourth selection on the board.

The two winners advance to the Cash Challenge and have their winnings doubled. The Second Chance and Cash Challenge remain the same as the previous format, but if a player has more than $40,000 in total, they play for $75,000 instead of $50,000.

== Cancellation and return ==
The show was replaced in October 2006 with Make Me Famous, Make Me Rich. However, due to disappointing ratings for that program, the Ohio Lottery announced the show would be replaced by a new version of Cash Explosion on October 6, 2007. All remaining Make Me Famous, Make Me Rich "ENTRY" winners sent in within 180 days of that game's official withdrawal were also eligible for Cash Explosion's return. In that case, anyone who made it on Cash Explosion with a $2 ticket won $2,250 on top of whatever they won.
