= Joseph Koziura =

American politician

Joe Koziura

Member of the Ohio House of Representatives from the 56th district
- In office October 30, 2001 – December 31, 2010
- Preceded by: Dan Metelsky
- Succeeded by: Dan Ramos
- In office January 3, 1985 – December 31, 1995
- Preceded by: Michael Camera
- Succeeded by: Dan Metelsky

Personal details
- Born: March 8, 1946 (age 80) Lorain, Ohio, US
- Party: Democratic
- Education: Lorain County Community College
- Profession: Financial advisor, state legislator

Joseph Koziura (born March 8, 1946) is an American Democratic politician who served in the Ohio House of Representatives from 1985 to 1995 and again from 2001 until 2010.

== Life and career ==
A native of Lorain, Ohio, Koziura, born on March 8, 1946, first ran and won a seat in the Ohio House of Representatives in 1984. He quickly rose in the ranks, and worked as an advocate for new development and innovation for his hometown of Lorain. Notably, Koziura was an early advocate for casinos in Ohio. He also championed women's rights law early in his career, and voting rights. Koziura was also influential on education initiatives, working closely with Ohio Governor George Voinovich throughout the 1990s.

In 1995, Koziura ran for Mayor of Lorain. He campaigned on the basis of his experience in the Ohio House. He won the election, took office on January 3, 1996, resigned from his House seat, and was succeeded by Dan Metelsky. His time as mayor was marked by colorful events, including a time when a felon threatened and punched Koziura while in his office. Soon after, he was arrested for drunken driving.

When Koziura ran for re-election of Mayor, his inappropriate remarks about senior citizens and the working class allowed Craig Foltin, a Republican, to win in a Democratic (70/30) city.

Koziura lost again when he faced Republican Tom Williams, a first time candidate with no political experience, for Lorain County Commissioner.

In May 2019, Koziura lost his primary election. On June 9, 2019, at 4:30 pm Koziura asked the Democratic Precinct members to appoint him as interim Mayor, promising to unite the party.

== Return to the Ohio House of Representatives ==
By 2001, Metelsky had resigned to seek another office, leaving Koziura's former seat open again. Wanting out of the mayor's office, he accepted an appointment back in his old seat in the Ohio House. He was sworn into office on October 30, 2001, and won a full term in November 2002. He won reelection in 2004, and again in 2006. By 2008, Democrats had again attained control of the House, and Koziura was named to several powerful committees.

Because of term limits, he was unable to run for reelection in 2010, after nine years in the post. He ran for county commissioner in Lorain County. Koziura was the only Democrat to lose a county race in the heavily Democratic county. His Republican opponent was new to politics and never ran / held office before. Koziura’s lost continued his losing streak against Republicans and put a Republican on the board of Lorain County Commissioners, for the second time, since World War II. Joe later returned to Lorain to serve on council, until losing his primary race in May 2019.
