= Ohio Lottery =

Lottery run by the state of Ohio

The Ohio Lottery Commission

Agency overview
- Formed: May 1973
- Jurisdiction: Ohio
- Headquarters: 615 W. Superior Ave. Cleveland, OH 44113
- Motto: Winners Happen Every Day
- Employees: 324
- Agency executive: Michelle Gillcrist, Director
- Website: www.ohiolottery.com

The Ohio Lottery is a state lottery run by the Ohio Lottery Commission. Its games consist of scratch tickets; Pick 3, Pick 4, Pick 5 ("numbers games"); Rolling Cash 5, Classic Lotto, Keno, Millionaire for Life, Mega Millions, and Powerball.

The Lottery's current interim director is Michelle Gillcrist, who was appointed by Governor Mike DeWine on April 12, 2023; previous directors include Pat McDonald, Mike Dolan, Tom Hayes, and Dennis Berg.

In April 2023, former Ohio Lottery executive director Pat McDonald denied claims of harassment days before he resigned for medical reasons.

As with most U.S. lotteries, Ohio Lottery players must be 18 or older. All Ohio Lottery drawings are observed by a representative of the Auditor of State, Keith Faber.

== History ==
In 1971, State Senator Ronald M. Mottl began a campaign to begin a lottery in Ohio. In 1973, the creation of the Ohio Lottery Commission was approved by voters; the Lottery began in August 1974 with the game Buckeye 300. Its first online game, The Number (now "Pick 3"), began in 1979.

In July 1983, the Ohio General Assembly began earmarking Lottery profits for education. It was made permanent in 1987 when voters approved a constitutional amendment to make Lottery profits a supplement revenue stream for education. As of 2020, the Ohio Lottery has contributed more than $26 billion to education beginning in 1974.

== Governance ==
The Ohio Lottery is run by the Ohio Lottery Commission. The Ohio Lottery Commission is made up of a Director and nine members appointed by the Governor of Ohio. The Director of the Lottery reports directly to the Governor.

== Current draw games ==
=== In-house draw games ===
==== Pick 3 ====
On December 3, 1979, The Number became the first Ohio online game where players could choose their number(s). On August 16, 1999, Pick 3 expanded to twice-daily draws. Sunday drawings were added on May 20, 2007.

==== Pick 4 ====
On April 9, 1981, Pick 4 was added; it began as a once-a-week game, gradually expanding to twice-daily drawings as well.

==== Pick 5 ====
On August 12, 2012, Pick 5 was added; it is played twice daily in conjunction with the other "numbers" games. The game is played much like Pennsylvania's game of the same name in that Pick 5 has straight and box wagers.

==== Rolling Cash 5 ====
On October 4, 2004, Rolling Cash 5 replaced Buckeye 5. The 5-of-5 prize in Buckeye 5 was changed to a jackpot that begins at $100,000. Since May 20, 2007, Rolling Cash 5 has been drawn nightly. The game draws 5 numbers from 1 to 39. Players who match the numbers drawn with the numbers on their Rolling Cash 5 tickets win or share the jackpot. Players who match 2, 3, or 4 of the winning numbers drawn out of the numbers chosen will also win a prize.

==== Classic Lotto ====
The game began on January 22, 2007; it replaced Lot 'O Play, a bingo-style game. Classic Lotto is drawn Mondays, Wednesdays, and Saturdays. Jackpots begin at $1 million and rolls based on sales of the game, with a guaranteed increase of $100,000; players pick 6 numbers from 1 to 49 for each game; games cost $1 each. Unlike Mega Millions and Powerball (see below), each using a "floating percentage" of their annuity for the two games' cash options, the Ohio-only game fixes the cash-value ratio of the annuity at 50%. On April 29, 2012, The Kicker, once retired, became an option for Classic Lotto players (see below.)

==== The Kicker (add-on to Classic Lotto) ====
In April 1988, The Kicker add-on game began, as an option for Super Lotto. A six-digit number was added to all Super Lotto tickets, whether or not The Kicker was "activated." When Super Lotto became Super Lotto Plus in July 2000, The Kicker was added to SLP.

When SLP ended in October 2005, The Kicker became an add-on for Mega Millions, but only within Ohio. This "relationship" lasted until mid-January 2011, when Ohio ended the add-on in favor of making the Megaplier available to Mega Millions players within Ohio (the Megaplier technically not an add-on, as it is not a "separate game"); the Megaplier began as a Texas-only option.

In April 2012, The Kicker was revived and became an add-on for Classic Lotto. A Classic Lotto play with The Kicker costs $1. An exact match in The Kicker wins $100,000; other prizes are available by matching the first 2, 3, 4, or 5 digits.

==== Keno ====
Keno is played at Ohio Lottery retailers that have a monitor. Keno was initially limited to retailers which have a liquor license allowing consumption of alcoholic beverages on the premises, thus making it available mostly in restaurants and bars. Keno to Go was added on April 9, 2012, which allows players to buy tickets at any Ohio Lottery retailer. Drawings are four minutes apart. Minimum play is $1.

==== Ohio Vax-A-Million ====
Although not officially a true lottery, the Ohio Vax-A-Million drawings were administered by the Ohio Lottery.

=== Multi-jurisdictional games ===
==== Millionaire for Life ====
Millionaire for Life is a multi-state game, which offer a Top prize, of $1,000,000 a year for life; second prize is $100,000 a year for life.

==== Mega Millions ====
On September 6, 1996, six lotteries began a jackpot game then known as The Big Game. On May 15, 2002, the multi-jurisdictional game, which temporarily became The Big Game Mega Millions, was added to the Ohio Lottery; Mega Millions' first drawing which included Ohio-bought tickets was two days later. The add-on game The Kicker (see above) was "transferred" from Super Lotto Plus to Mega Millions in 2005; Ohio ended The Kicker when the Megaplier (which began as a Texas-only option) was available to Ohio players of Mega Millions in 2011.

Mega Millions' starting jackpot is $40 million, paid in 30 graduated installments; a cash option is available.

==== Powerball ====
Powerball began in 1992. On October 13, 2009, the Mega Millions consortium and the Multi-State Lottery Association (MUSL) reached an agreement in principle to cross-sell Mega Millions and Powerball in US lottery jurisdictions. Both games added members on January 31, 2010; although Ohio, already with Mega Millions, did not add Powerball until April 16, 2010. The first Powerball drawing including Ohio was the following night.

A ticket bought in Ohio for the June 2, 2010, Powerball drawing became its first potential Powerball jackpot winner; it is the first time a lottery selling either Mega Millions or Powerball (but not both) on January 31, 2010 sold a jackpot-winning ticket for its newer game after the cross-selling expansion date. The ticket was worth $261.6 million (annuity).

== Retired draw games ==
=== Ohio Lotto ===
On April 9, 1983, Ohio Lotto 6/40 was added; it was drawn Saturdays. Jackpots began at $250,000. On November 19, 1983, the starting jackpot was increased to $1 million. On October 3, 1984, Wednesday drawings were added; after February 12, 1986, the game returned to Saturdays only. Its final drawing was on April 18, 1987.

=== Super Lotto ===
On February 19, 1986, Super Lotto 6/44 was added and was drawn Wednesdays; it replaced the 6/40 Wednesday drawings. On April 25, 1987, the 6/44 added Saturdays, replacing the 6/40 altogether. Players of the 6/44 paid $1 per game; its jackpots began at $5 million. The base jackpot was reduced to $3 million when twice-a-week draws resumed. On April 30, 1988, The Kicker (see above) began as an add-on, initially to the 6/44. On October 6, 1990, the 6/44 was changed to a 6/53 matrix (with two plays for $1), with the jackpot again starting at $5 million. Months later, the 6/53 was retired; in its place was the 6/47 (one play for $1), with the jackpots now starting at $4 million. The final 6/47 drawing was July 8, 2000.

=== Cards ===
Played in a similar fashion as most US "pick-4" drawing games, except players had to match one playing card(2 through Ace) in each of the four suits.

=== Buckeye 5 ===
On May 5, 1992, Buckeye 5 was added; it was originally drawn on Tuesday and Friday nights. Buckeye 5's top prize was $100,000. On July 1, 1993, Buckeye 5 was expanded to Mondays, Tuesdays, Thursdays, and Fridays; on April 1, 2002, Buckeye 5 became a Monday-through-Saturday game. Buckeye 5's last drawing was on October 2, 2004; it was replaced with Rolling Cash 5.

=== Super Lotto Plus ===
On July 15, 2000, SLP was introduced, replacing the 6/47. SLP was a 6/49 game that also drew a "bonus ball." The Kicker became an add-on to SLP. The jackpots again began at $4 million. SLP's last drawing was October 8, 2005, with The Kicker becoming Mega Millions' add-on game.

=== Lot 'O Play ===
On October 12, 2005, Lot 'O Play held its first drawing. It was a 5/100 bingo-style game with base jackpots of $1 million. Lot O'Play's last drawing was on January 20, 2007, after which it was replaced by Classic Lotto.

=== Ten-OH! ===
Ohio added a twice-daily game on August 5, 2007, called Ten-OH!, which was a Keno-like game; the first Ohio Lottery game in which the drawings were computerized. (As a result, the Ten-OH! drawings were not televised.) The top prize of $500,000 was won by matching 10 of the 20 numbers drawn.

On August 11, 2012, 10-OH! had its final drawing. It was replaced by Pick 5 the following day. The popularity of Ten-OH! was hampered by the addition of Keno to bars and restaurants in 2008, which made the game somewhat redundant. The addition of Keno to Go in 2012 made it further redundant.

== Cash Explosion (C.E) ==
The Cash Explosion game show returned in October 2007, replacing Make Me Famous, Make Me Rich (which itself had replaced Cash Explosion Double Play a year earlier). In September 2017, the show is alternatively named “C.E.” It is the only lottery game show in the United States.

== See also ==
- Gambling
- Lotteries in the United States
