= Gambling in Indiana =

Types and locations of gambling allowed in Indiana, US

Locations of casinos in Indiana
Riverboat Land-based Racino Indian

Indiana law authorizes ten land-based or riverboat casinos on Lake Michigan and the Ohio River, one land-based casino in French Lick, and racinos at the state's two horse tracks. In addition, there is one Indian casino in the state. Other forms of legal gambling are the Hoosier Lottery, parimutuel wagering on horse races, and sports betting.

== Lottery ==
The Indiana Constitution of 1851 included a ban on lotteries, which was broadly construed by courts as a prohibition on gambling in general. In 1988, state voters approved a constitutional amendment lifting the lottery ban, establishing the Hoosier Lottery.

The Hoosier Lottery sells scratch-off tickets since October 1989. It is a member of the Multi-State Lottery Association since 1990. and co-founder of Powerball in 1992. It joined Mega Millions in 2010 and Cash4Life in 2016. Other draw games include Hoosier Lotto, Cash 5, and Poker Lotto.

== Horse racing ==
Pari-mutuel betting was legalized in 1989. Harrah's Hoosier Park opened in Anderson in 1994, and off-track betting parlors opened in the state in 1995. Indiana Downs (now Horseshoe Indianapolis) opened in Shelbyville in 2002. Hoosier Park became a racino on 2008 and Indiana Downs did the same in 2009.

== Casinos ==
=== Legalization efforts ===
Critics of lottery legalization said the measure would lead to casino gambling, while legislators said there would be little support for casinos.

Within months of the amendment's passage, Gary mayor Thomas Barnes proposed opening up the economically depressed city to high-rise resort casinos. The Indiana General Assembly rejected a Gary casino bill in 1989, but did assent to a non-binding referendum, which city voters approved by 60 percent. The city began talks to acquire 350 acres of land at the Gary Works for as many as five casinos.

Gaming companies from Nevada and Atlantic City flocked to join in lobbying efforts to support a second attempt in the 1990 legislative session, but it was blocked by Senate Republican leaders. In the 1991 session, state Rep. Charlie Brown of Gary introduced an expanded bill authorizing riverboat casinos on the Ohio River and a casino in the resort area of French Lick and West Baden Springs, to attract broader support. The mayor of Hammond floated the idea of converting the SS Clipper into a casino, but it was not included in the bill. The proposal passed the House but was rejected by a Senate committee.

Brown introduced a Gary casino bill in the 1992 session, but it drew little support due to legislators' aversion to controversy in an election year. Southern Indiana legislators introduced a bill to allow riverboat casinos on the Ohio River, which passed the House, and was then expanded, with support from Gary lawmakers, to include boats on Lake Michigan, which were seen as less controversial than land-based casinos. The bill was rejected by the Senate.

With new backing from Republican entrepreneur Dean White, Brown reintroduced his bill in the 1993 session, with land-based casinos in Gary and French Lick, and riverboats on the Ohio River, and it passed the House, but was again voted down in Senate committee. A measure was introduced later in the session to allow four riverboats each on Lake Michigan and the Ohio, but it was killed by Senate leaders.

Because it failed to approve a budget, the Assembly convened for a special session in June 1993. After weeks of wrangling, a compromise was reached on a Republican budget with no tax increases, with a few side issues to appease Democrats, including authorization of riverboat casinos. The law allowed up to five sites on the shore of Lake Michigan (including two in Gary), five on the Ohio River, and one on Patoka Lake, near French Lick. Casinos were expected to raise at least $100 million in taxes per year.

=== Licensing and construction ===
The first round of gaming license applications in September 1993 attracted 27 proposals for sites in 12 cities. Local referendums, required to authorize casinos in each city or county (except Gary), were held in November; voters in Clark, Floyd, Porter, and Warrick counties rejected casinos, while voters in Hammond and East Chicago and in Dearborn, LaPorte, Ohio, Switzerland, and Vanderburgh counties approved them.

February 2, 1994 was the application deadline for licenses in the communities where referendums had passed; by that day, the number of applications had risen to 50. Officials in some cities conducted extensive hearings to decide which applicants to endorse, though the final decisions were in the hands of the Gaming Commission. City leaders examined 25 proposals in Gary, 6 in Evansville, and 8 in Lawrenceburg.

After the Porter County referendum failed, several businessmen from Portage had sued the state, arguing that the riverboat law violated the state constitution's ban on special treatment for particular cities, because it called for citywide votes in Hammond and East Chicago, but countywide votes in all other localities. A judge agreed with them in May 1994, enjoining the Gaming Commission from issuing licenses. The Indiana Supreme Court overturned that ruling six months later, but some developers had already withdrawn their proposals because of the stalled process.

Four more local referendums were held in 1994, with Crawford, Harrison, and Perry counties approving casinos, and Jefferson County rejecting them.

The Gaming Commission issued its first preliminary licenses, for the two boats in Gary, in December 1994. One went to Donald Trump's company, Trump Hotels & Casino Resorts, and the other went to a joint venture between Detroit businessman Don Barden and President Casinos. The commission next visited Evansville, awarding a license to Aztar Corp. in February 1995, and then southeast Indiana in July, where it selected a Hyatt-affiliated project in Rising Sun and a group led by Argosy Gaming and Conseco to build a casino in Lawrenceburg. In Hammond, the panel gave the nod in November to Empress River Casino, operator of two riverboats in Joliet, Illinois.

Development of the Gary boats was delayed by disputes over the acquisition of land at Buffington Harbor and the withdrawal of President Casinos from its partnership with Barden. As a result, Casino Aztar Evansville was the first riverboat to open, on December 7, 1995.

The Gaming Commission continued its work in 1996, approving in January the only applicant for the East Chicago license, a group led by Showboat, Inc., a Michigan City casino in April, to be built by the operator of an East Dubuque, Illinois riverboat, and in May, a Caesars World casino in Harrison County.

The two Gary riverboats, Trump Casino and Barden's Majestic Star, opened on June 11, 1996, and the Empress Casino in Hammond followed weeks later. They were initially prevented from leaving dock by the Johnson Act, a federal law prohibiting gambling on U.S. territorial waters such as the Great Lakes. The boats ran "phantom cruises", allowing gamblers to board only at scheduled cruise times. Congress amended the Johnson Act in October, allowing the boats to cruise as required by Indiana law.

With three Ohio River casinos set to open, the Gaming Commission postponed a decision on granting the fifth Ohio River license to Crawford or Switzerland County, deciding to wait to observe the results of the other casinos. Hyatt opened its Grand Victoria II casino in Rising Sun in October 1996, and the Argosy Casino in nearby Lawrenceburg followed in December. The Caesars project, meanwhile, was continually delayed by environmental concerns and archaeological work.

Michigan City's Blue Chip Casino, moored in a channel of Trail Creek where it was built on-site, opened in August 1997.

By May 1998, the two Cincinnati-area casinos were reporting strong results, so the commission decided to lift its unofficial moratorium on issuing a fifth license. Casino America, the sole applicant for Crawford County, dropped its bid, leaving just one proposal for the commission to consider, a joint venture of Hollywood Park and Boomtown in Vevay, which it approved in September.

Caesars Indiana finally opened in November 1998. After being delayed by damage from a mid-river collision en route to Vevay, the Belterra Casino opened in October 2000.

=== Later developments ===
The Patoka Lake license went unused because the Army Corps of Engineers, which claims ownership of the reservoir, had a regulation against gambling on its property. Legislators in 2003 authorized an eleventh casino to instead be built in a man-made lake in the area of French Lick and West Baden Springs. The casino's conversion to a land-based facility was retroactively authorized in 2010.

A law passed in 2007 allowed the state's two racetracks, Hoosier Park and Indiana Downs, to install up to 2,000 slot machines each.

In 2015, the legislature amended the casino law to allow the state's riverboat casinos to move into land-based facilities on their existing sites, to help them remain competitive with casinos in neighboring states. Tropicana Evansville (formerly Casino Aztar) was the first to take advantage of the new law, opening its land-based facility in 2017.

An unintended consequence of legal gaming was the burden on charity gaming by non-profit organizations.

=== Indian casino ===
The Pokagon Band of Potawatomi Indians, a tribe historically located in the St. Joseph River Valley of northern Indiana and southwestern Michigan, regained federal recognition in 1994, and its members soon voted to pursue casino gaming as an economic development measure. Discussions focused on sites in Michigan because state officials were more friendly to tribal gaming than those in Indiana, and the tribe had deeper ties to that state. A site in New Buffalo, Michigan, near the Indiana border, was selected in May 1996, but reports that the tribe was considering a casino in South Bend or Elkhart continued to surface. By 2001, the tribe said it had no plans for a casino in Indiana. After years of legal battles, the tribe's Four Winds New Buffalo casino opened in 2007. The tribe announced new plans in 2012 for a 164-acre "tribal village" in South Bend, including a casino. Four Winds South Bend, a Class II gaming facility, opened in January 2018.

=== List of casinos ===
Casino	City	County	State	District	Type	Comments
Ameristar Casino East Chicago	East Chicago	Lake	Indiana	Lake Michigan	Riverboat	Formerly Resorts, Harrahs, and Showboat Mardi Gras
Bally's Evansville	Evansville	Vanderburgh	Indiana	Ohio River	Land-based	Formerly Casino Aztar and Tropicana
Belterra Casino Resort & Spa	Florence	Switzerland	Indiana	Ohio River	Riverboat
Blue Chip Casino	Michigan City	LaPorte	Indiana	Lake Michigan	Riverboat
Caesars Southern Indiana	Elizabeth	Harrison	Indiana	Ohio River	Land-based	Formerly Horseshoe
Four Winds South Bend	South Bend	St. Joseph	Indiana		Native American
Hard Rock Casino Northern Indiana	Gary	Lake	Indiana	Lake Michigan	Land-based
French Lick Resort Casino	French Lick	Orange	Indiana		Land-based
Hollywood Casino Lawrenceburg	Lawrenceburg	Dearborn	Indiana	Ohio River	Riverboat	Formerly Argosy Casino
Hoosier Park	Anderson	Madison	Indiana		Racino
Horseshoe Hammond	Hammond	Lake	Indiana	Lake Michigan	Riverboat	Formerly Empress Casino
Horseshoe Indianapolis	Shelbyville	Shelby	Indiana		Racino	Formerly Indiana Live! and Indiana Grand
Rising Star Casino Resort	Rising Sun	Ohio	Indiana	Ohio River	Riverboat	Formerly Grand Victoria Casino & Resort
Terre Haute Casino Resort	Terre Haute	Vigo	Indiana	Ohio River	Land-based	Opened in 2024

=== List of former casinos ===
Casino	City	County	State	District	Type	Comments
Majestic Star Casino	Gary	Lake	Indiana	Lake Michigan	Riverboat	Closed in 2021.
Majestic Star II	Gary	Lake	Indiana	Lake Michigan	Riverboat	Previously Trump Casino. Closed in 2021.

== Sports betting ==
In 2019, the Indiana legislature legalized sports betting starting in September. Casinos, racinos, and off-track betting facilities are eligible for licenses, which allow brick-and-mortar and online betting. The state collects a 9.5% tax. Only professional and college sports competitions can be wagered upon.

== Gallery ==
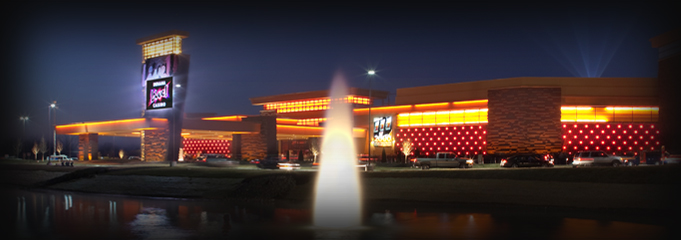
Indiana Live! Casino

== See also ==
- List of casinos in the United States
- List of casino hotels
