= Anything for Money =

American game show

- Genre: Game Show
- Directed by: Jeff Goldstein
- Presented by: Fred Travalena
- Announcer: Johnny Gilbert
- Composer: Dennis McCarthy
- Country of origin: United States
- No. of seasons: 1
- No. of episodes: 150

Production
- Executive producers: David B. Fein; Tracy Goss
- Producer: Eytan Keller
- Running time: 30 minutes
- Production companies: Bernstein/Hovis Productions; Impact Studios; Paramount Television

Original release
- Network: Syndicated
- Release: September 17, 1984 – August 1985

Anything for Money is an American television game show where two contestants tried to predict the outcomes of situations in which cast members Christopher Callen and Ralph Harris attempted to coerce passers-by into participating in jokes, in exchange for increasing amounts of money.

Fred Travalena hosted Anything for Money with Johnny Gilbert serving as announcer. The series was syndicated to stations to air as part of their daytime lineups and premiered on September 17, 1984. Originally slated to air twenty-two weeks of new episodes at first, an additional eight weeks were ordered over the course of the season and a total of 150 episodes aired before the show was cancelled. First-run episodes aired from the premiere until April 19, 1985, and reruns aired until sometime in August 1985. The show later aired on USA Network from 1986 until 1988.

The series was produced by Gary Bernstein and Larry Hovis, packaged by their production company Bernstein/Hovis Productions and Impact Studios, and distributed by Paramount Television.

== Rules ==
Travalena would introduce clips and, once the premise of the prank was known, the contestants then guessed whether or not the participants would consent. Three rounds were played, with a correct guess worth $200 in round 1, $300 in round 2, and $500 in round 3.

The player with the most money after 3 rounds was the champ and received a bonus prize, besides their winnings. If the scores ended in a tie, both players received the bonus prize and became co-champs.

== Controversy ==
Anything for Money was originally a concept developed by Ralph Andrews Productions in 1983. Gary Bernstein was working for the company during this time, and Andrews had an agreement with Columbia Pictures Television which gave Columbia first right of refusal for any Andrews-produced project between 1980 and 1986. Bernstein at the time was also partnering with actor Larry Hovis in his own venture. When Anything for Money was originally devised, CPT refused it outright. Andrews then advised Bernstein to go to Paramount and try and sell it to them, which he was successful in doing. A problem arose, however, because Bernstein said that he had owned the rights to the show and not Andrews. Paramount later picked up Anything for Money in 1984 and hired Bernstein and Hovis to produce it, thus causing Andrews to file a lawsuit against Paramount for taking his concept. Paramount won summary judgment in 1984, but after years of appeals, Andrews won a reversal in 1990.

This did not affect Andrews and Bernstein's relationship as colleagues, as the two production units later launched Yahtzee in 1988. However, that program was also mired in controversy that would lead to a lawsuit being filed by the latter.

== International versions ==
An equally short-lived British version ran on Sky One from February 6, 1991, until September 28, 1992, hosted by Andrew O'Connor.

In 1991, SBT premiered a Brazilian version, Topa Tudo por Dinheiro, hosted by the network's founder and owner Silvio Santos.

== Sources ==
- Anything for Money at IMDb
