= Indiana Oaks top three finishers and starters =

This is a listing of the horses that finished in either first, second, or third place and the number of starters in the Indiana Oaks, an American Grade 2 race for three-year-old fillies at 1-1/16 miles on synthetic surface held at Hoosier Park in Anderson, Indiana. (List 1995-present)

Year	Winner	Second	Third	Starters
2022	Interstatedaydream	Runaway Wife	Silverleaf	7
2021	Soothsay	Moon Swag	Lady Aces	9
2020	Shedaresthedevil	Impeccable Style	Bayerness	8
2019	Street Band	Sundaysatthebeach	Chocolate Kisses	12
2018	Talk Veuve to Me	Figarella's Queen	Kelly's Humor	7
2017	Overture	Mopotism	Majestic Quality	8
2016	Family Tree	Emmzy	Mines and Magic	8
2015	High Dollar Woman	Sweet Grass	Oceanwave	9
2014	Tiz Windy	Unbridled Forever	Penwith	11
2013	Pure Fun	Oscar Party	Fiftyshadesofhay	7
2012	Grace Hall	Wine Princess	Eden's Moon	6
2011	Juanita	Withgreatpleasure	Daisy Devine	6
2010	Always A Princess	Ash Zee	Harissa	6
2009	No Race	No Race	No Race	N/A
2008	Skylighter	Shining Image	Dubai Majesty	10
2007	Tessa Blue	Boca Grande	Marietta	10
2006	Baghdaria	Cryptoquip	Southern Flu	8
2005	Flying Glitter	Eyes on Eddy	Miss Matched	6
2004	Daydreaming	Capeside Lady	Stellar Jayne	7
2003	Awesome Humor	Cloakof Vagueness	Shot Gun Favorite	10
2002	Bare Necessities	Erica's Smile	Tarnished Lady	9
2001	Scoop	Gold Huntress	Caressing	9
2000	Humble Clerk	Megans Bluff	Miss Seffens	5
1999	Brushed Halory	The Happer Hopper	Chelsea's House	10
1998	French Braids	Remember Ike	Barefoot Dyana	7
1997	Cotton Carnival	Sheepscott	Valid Bonnet	9
1996	Princess Eloise	Talking Tower	Shuffle Again	6
1995	Niner's Home	Alltheway Birtie	Graceful Minister	6
