= Indiana Oaks =

- Class: Grade III
- Location: Horseshoe Indianapolis; Shelbyville, Indiana, United States
- Inaugurated: 1995
- Race type: Thoroughbred - Flat racing
- Website: www.caesars.com/horseshoe-indianapolis

Race information
- Distance: 1 1/16 miles (8.5 furlongs)
- Surface: Dirt
- Track: left-handed
- Qualification: Three-year-old fillies
- Weight: 121 lbs with allowances
- Purse: $200,000

The Indiana Oaks is a Grade III American Thoroughbred horse race for three-year-old fillies run over a distance of 1 1/16 miles on the dirt held annually in July at Horseshoe Indianapolis in Shelbyville, Indiana.

== History ==
The Indiana Oaks was inaugurated on 16 September 1995 at Hoosier Park and run over a distance of 1 mile. The event was won by the short odds-on Niner's Home who withstood the fast closing Alltheway Bertie to win by a neck in a time 1:37 flat on a fast track.

The event was held over a mile in 1996 before being extended to the current distance of 1 1/16 miles in 1997.

The event was upgraded to Grade III in 2001 and in 2008 to Grade II. It held this classification until 2017 when the event was downgraded back to Grade III.

The event carried Breeders' Cup incentives between 1998 and 2006 which were reflected in the name of the event.

In 2013 the event was moved to Indiana Grand, now known as Horseshoe Indianapolis. Since 2015, the race has been held in July.

== Records ==
Speed record:

- 1 1/16 miles: 1:41.85 - Grace Hall (2012)
- 1 mile: 1:37.00 - Princess Eloise (1996) & Niner's Home (1995)

Margins:

- 8 lengths – Bare Necessities (2002)

Most wins by a jockey:

- 4 - Julien Leparoux (2011, 2016, 2017, 2018)

Most wins by a trainer:

- 3 - Kenneth G. McPeek (2013, 2023, 2026)

Most wins by an owner:

- 2 - WinStar Farm: (2003, 2017)
- 2 - Flurry Racing Stables (2020, 2022)

== Winners ==
Year	Winner	Jockey	Trainer	Owner	Distance	Time	Purse	Grade	Ref
At Horseshoe Indianapolis (Indiana Grand Race Course)
2026	Maximum Offer	Luis Saez	Kenneth G. McPeek	Baccari Racing Stable, Alfred Riccio & Robert Cotrone	1 1/16 miles	1:42.65	$200,000	III	
2025	Clicquot	Edgar Morales	Brendan P. Walsh	X-Men Racing IV, Madaket Stables & SF Racing	1 1/16 miles	1:42.42	$200,000	III	
2024	Chatalas	Antonio Fresu	Grant T. Forster	Rancho Temescal Thoroughbred Partners, Dan J. Agnew & William Chatalas	1 1/16 miles	1:42.93	$200,000	III	
2023	Defining Purpose	Brian Hernandez Jr.	Kenneth G. McPeek	Katsumi Yoshida	1 1/16 miles	1:43.83	$200,000	III	
2022	Interstatedaydream	Florent Geroux	Brad H. Cox	Flurry Racing Stables	1 1/16 miles	1:45.78	$200,000	III	
2021	Soothsay	Flavien Prat	Richard E. Mandella	Raydelz Stables	1 1/16 miles	1:44.36	$200,000	III	
2020	Shedaresthedevil	Florent Geroux	Brad H. Cox	Flurry Racing Stables	1 1/16 miles	1:43.50	$200,000	III	
2019	Street Band	Sophie Doyle	J. Larry Jones	Ray Francis, Cindy & Larry Jones, Medallion Racing & MyRacehorse.com	1 1/16 miles	1:43.01	$200,000	III	
2018	Talk Veuve to Me	Julien R. Leparoux	Rodolphe Brisset	Team Valor, Rodolphe Brisset & Stephen McKay	1 1/16 miles	1:43.15	$200,000	III	
2017	Overture	Julien R. Leparoux	William I. Mott	WinStar Farm	1 1/16 miles	1:43.79	$200,000	III	
2016	Family Tree	Julien R. Leparoux	Wayne M. Catalano	Gary & Mary West	1 1/16 miles	1:44.46	$203,200	II	
2015	High Dollar Woman	Joseph Rocco Jr.	Steve Hobby	Alex & JoAnne Lieblong	1 1/16 miles	1:43.49	$200,000	II	
2014	Tiz Windy	Brian Hernandez Jr.	Carl A. Nafzger	Jim Tafel	1 1/16 miles	1:42.70	$204,400	II	
2013	Pure Fun	Victor Lebron	Kenneth G. McPeek	Magdalena Racing	1 1/16 miles	1:43.70	$202,300	II	
At Hoosier Park
2012	Grace Hall	Brian Hernandez Jr.	Anthony W. Dutrow	Michael Dubb, Bethlehem Stables & Stuart Grant	1 1/16 miles	1:41.85	$205,600	II	
2011	Juanita	Julien R. Leparoux	Michael J. Maker	William & Graydon Patterson	1 1/16 miles	1:45.20	$205,100	II	
2010	Always a Princess	Martin Garcia	Bob Baffert	Arnold Zetcher	1 1/16 miles	1:43.60	$205,200	II	
2009	Race not held								
2008	Skylighter	Eddie Castro	Robert J. Frankel	Stonerside Stable	1 1/16 miles	1:44.80	$406,400	II	
2007	Tessa Blue	Mike E. Smith	Frank L. Brothers	Bruce Lunsford	1 1/16 miles	1:44.42	$406,900	III	
2006	Baghdaria	Rafael Bejarano	Thomas M. Amoss	Clinton C. & Susan A. Atkins	1 1/16 miles	1:43.64	$402,800	III	
2005	Flying Glitter	Robby Albarado	Ronny W. Werner	Nancy R. & Richard S. Kaster	1 1/16 miles	1:44.10	$405,100	III	
2004	Daydreaming	John R. Velazquez	Claude R. McGaughey III	Ogden Mills Phipps	1 1/16 miles	1:43.65	$406,300	III	
2003	Awesome Humor	Robby Albarado	W. Elliott Walden	WinStar Farm	1 1/16 miles	1:45.75	$306,900	III	
2002	Bare Necessities	Jose Valdivia Jr.	Wallace Dollase	Iron County Farms	1 1/16 miles	1:45.83	$306,400	III	
2001	Scoop	Robby Albarado	Gene A. Cilio	Jim Tafel	1 1/16 miles	1:44.06	$205,800	III	
2000	Humble Clerk	Larry Melancon	Niall M. O'Callaghan	Gary A. Tanaka	1 1/16 miles	1:42.40	$174,300	Listed	
1999	Brushed Halory	Eddie Martin Jr.	Josie Carroll	Alice & James Sapara	1 1/16 miles	1:44.64	$204,058	Listed	
1998	French Braids	Willie Martinez	Dallas Stewart	Thomas Vanderhyde	1 1/16 miles	1:43.11	$203,800	Listed	
1997	Cotton Carnival	Eddie Martin Jr.	Roger L. Attfield	Windhaven	1 1/16 miles	1:43.30	$107,400	Listed	
1996	Princess Eloise	Scott T. Saito	Margaret E. Grimm	Margaret E. Grimm	1 mile	1:37.00	$55,900	Listed	
1995	Niner's Home	Tracy J. Hebert	Carl A. Nafzger	Russell L. Reineman Stable	1 mile	1:37.00	$40,800		

== See also ==
- List of American and Canadian Graded races
- Indiana Oaks top three finishes and starters
