= Buffington Harbor =

Coordinates: 41.6428°N 87.4158°W

The Buffington Harbor is located on the shores of Gary, Indiana United States. It is home to restaurants, hotels, and two casino boats owned by Don Barden

== Recreation ==
- The Majestic Star Casino, LLC owns and operates two casino boats at Buffington harbor. They are the majority proprietor of the harbor.
- The Trump Organization formerly owned a casino boat at Buffingon, Trump Casino, but due to financial trouble at other casinos, was forced to sell his casino to Majestic Star.

Don Barden (owner of Majestic Star Casino, LLC) has released plans for an arena and other commercial development for the harbor.
