= Power Broker =

Power broker is a political science term for a person who influences people to vote towards a particular client in exchange for political and financial benefits.

Power Broker may also refer to:

- Power Broker (character), a fictional corporation and character in the Marvel Universe
  - Power Broker (Marvel Cinematic Universe), the live-action adaptation of the character
- Power Broker (horse), an American Thoroughbred racehorse
- "Power Broker" (The Falcon and the Winter Soldier), the third episode of the 2021 television series

== See also ==
- The Power Broker, a 1974 book by Robert Caro
