= Sophie Doyle =

British jockey based in the US

Personal information
- Born: 1986 (age 39–40) Cambridge, England
- Occupation: Jockey

Horse racing career
- Sport: Horse racing

Major racing wins
- Cotillion Stakes (2019)

Significant horses
- Fioretti; Street Band

Sophie Doyle (born 1986) is a Grade 1 race winning retired British jockey who is based in the United States and competed in flat racing.

== Background ==
Doyle is the daughter of trainer Jacqueline Doyle, who trained 2000 Winter Derby winner Zanay and had also been an amateur jump jockey, and older sister of jockey James Doyle. She was born in Cambridge and moved to Lambourn in Berkshire when she was six years old. She learnt to ride as a very young child and at one time was interested in becoming a show jumper, before deciding on a career in horse racing.

== Racing career ==
Doyle's first race was as an apprentice jockey in a race at Lingfield on 20 February 2006. Riding 66/1 outsider Christmas Truce, trained by her mother, she was narrowly beaten into second place by her brother on the 2/1 favourite Samson Quest. Six weeks later, at the same course, Christmas Truce provided her with the first win of her career. In 2010, Doyle was the leading female apprentice with 28 wins. Having spent two winters exercising horses in the US, she decided to move there permanently in 2013 in search of better opportunities as a jockey.

Doyle secured her first Grade win in October 2015, when Fioretti won the Grade 2 Thoroughbred Club of America Stakes at Keeneland, Kentucky. The victory gave them an entry into the 2015 Breeders' Cup, where they were unplaced in the Filly & Mare Sprint. James Doyle was also riding at the meeting, making them the first brother and sister to ride at a Breeders' Cup.

In August 2018, Doyle landed her 200th winner in the US. The following season she won the Grade 2 Fair Grounds Oaks, the Grade 3 Indiana Oaks, and the Grade 1 Cotillion Stakes on Street Band, trained by J. Larry Jones. Doyle then made her second appearance at the Breeders' Cup, where Street Band ran unplaced in the 2019 Breeders' Cup Distaff. In 2024, Doyle returned to race riding following a two-year break after the birth of her daughter. She retired from race riding at the end of 2025, having ridden 478 winners in the US.

== Personal life ==
Doyle and her partner, trainer Chris Davis, have a daughter, Emilie, born in 2022.

== Major wins ==
United States

- Cotillion Stakes - (1) - Street Band (2019)
