= Golden Nugget Atlantic City =

Hotel and casino in Atlantic City, United States

Coordinates: 39.378547°N 74.429176°W

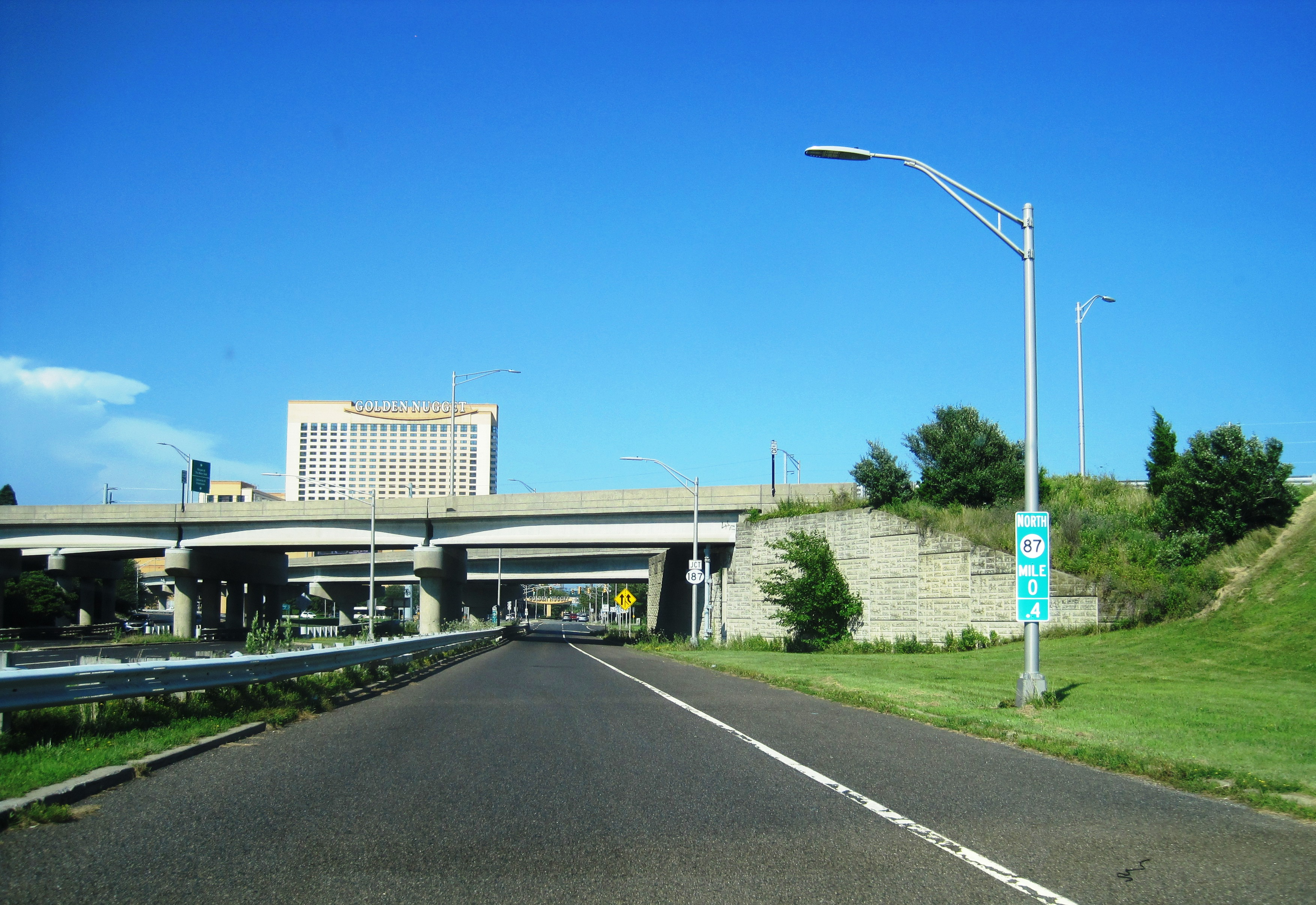
- Interactive map of Golden Nugget Atlantic City
- Location: Atlantic City, New Jersey, United States; 1 Castle Boulevard
- Opened: June 17, 1985; 41 years ago
- Theme: Gold Rush
- No. of rooms: 717
- Gaming space: 74,252 sq ft (6,898.2 m^{2})
- Signature attractions: Farley State Marina; The Deck
- Notable restaurants: Chart House; Lillie's Asian Cuisine; Vic & Anthony's
- Casino type: Land
- Owner: Landry's, Inc.
- Previous names: Trump's Castle (1985–1997); Trump Marina (1997–2011)
- Renovated in: 1997, 2006, 2011
- Website: www.goldennugget.com/atlantic city

Golden Nugget Atlantic City is a hotel, casino, and marina located in Atlantic City, New Jersey, United States. It opened in 1985 as Trump’s Castle and was renamed Trump Marina in 1997. Landry's, Inc. purchased the casino from Trump Entertainment Resorts in February 2011, and the sale was approved in late May. Landry's took control of the property on May 23, 2011, and renamed it the Golden Nugget Atlantic City.

== Complex ==
The resort sits on a 14.6 acres (5.9 ha) property and contains a 74,252 sq ft (6,898.2 m^{2}) casino; 717 guest rooms; seven restaurants; a nightclub; a 462-seat theater; a 16,920 sq ft (1,572 m^{2}) recreation deck with a health spa, outdoor heated pool, hot tubs, cabanas, tennis and basketball courts, and jogging track; 50,922 sq ft (4,730.8 m^{2}) of meeting and function space; a nine-story parking garage with direct walk-through into the complex; and the 640-slip Frank Farley Marina (a public facility owned by the New Jersey Division of Parks and Forestry and managed by Landry's). The Sportsbook is a sportsbook at the resort that offers sports betting.

The third level is the main area of the property. At its center is a 210 ft (64 m) long reception area from which point every amenity—the casino, ballrooms, restaurants, showroom, or meeting rooms—is within a short walk.

=== Entertainment ===
The resort's 2,000-seat ballroom and 462-seat theater have played host to a wide array of entertainers including Prince, Frank Sinatra, Johnny Cash, Sting, Steve Martin, Andy Williams, The Beach Boys, Ray Charles, Jerry Lee Lewis, Billy Crystal, Perry Como, Peter Allen, Connie Francis, Air Supply and Aretha Franklin. On Memorial Day weekend in 2013 Haven nightclub opened.

Boxing and mixed martial arts matches are held at the casino.

=== Dining ===
- Chart House
- The Buffet
- The Deck Bayfront Bar & Restaurant
- The Poolside Cafe
- Vic & Anthony's
- Michael Patrick's Brasserie
- Dos Caminos
- Lillie's Asian Cuisine
- Bill's Bar & Burger

== History ==
=== Trump's Castle (1985–1997) ===
The casino was built as the Atlantic City Hilton by Hilton Hotels, at a cost of $275 million. However, when the resort was nearly complete, that company was denied a gambling license by the State of New Jersey due to alleged ties to organized crime and sold the complex to Donald Trump. It opened in 1985 as Trump's Castle, later rebranded slightly as Trump Castle. In 1988, the casino became one of the settings for the game show version of Yahtzee, and in 1990 it was the setting for the game show Trump Card.

Revenues at Trump Castle took a sharp decline in 1990 due to competition from its newly opened sister property, Trump Taj Mahal, as well as broader economic factors such as the Gulf War and the early 1990s recession. A payment to bondholders was made in December 1990 only with the help of a $3.5 million purchase of casino chips by Trump's father, Fred Trump, which was later determined to be an illegal loan, for which the casino paid a fine of $30,000. Unable to make its next payment on $338 million in bonds, the Castle began debt restructuring negotiations in May 1991. Hilton offered to repurchase the property for $165 million, which Trump rejected. A deal was ultimately reached to give the bondholders 50 percent ownership of the Castle, in exchange for reduced interest rates and forgiveness of $25 million of debt. The plan was filed as a prepackaged bankruptcy in March 1992.

Trump reacquired full ownership of the Castle in a refinancing deal in December 1993. He then sold the property in September 1996 to his new publicly traded casino company, Trump Hotels & Casino Resorts, for $130 million in stock plus $355 million in assumed debt.

Trump then began negotiations to sell a 50 percent stake in the property to the Rank Organization for $325 million and convert it into a Hard Rock Hotel and Casino. Discussions fizzled in December 1996, and Trump said he would look for a new theme, saying he "never liked the castle theme." Trump next announced an agreement to sell a 51 percent stake in the Castle to Colony Capital for $125 million, which would be used to construct a new hotel tower and re-theme the property as Trump Marina. The sale and expansion were canceled, however, in March 1997.

=== Trump Marina (1997–2011) ===
The Castle was renamed Trump Marina in June 1997. Trump Entertainment Resorts agreed in May 2008 to sell Trump Marina for $316 million to New York-based Coastal Development, who planned to rebrand the property as a Margaritaville casino in partnership with singer Jimmy Buffett. Despite a later price reduction to $270 million, Coastal was unable to find financing, and the agreement was terminated in June 2009. Negotiations continued while Atlantic City casino values plunged, with Coastal offering $75 million for the property in February 2010, but no deal was reached. Bondholders who had taken over Trump Entertainment Resorts after its 2009 bankruptcy remained eager to sell Trump Marina and focus on the company's two other casinos.

=== Golden Nugget (2011–present) ===
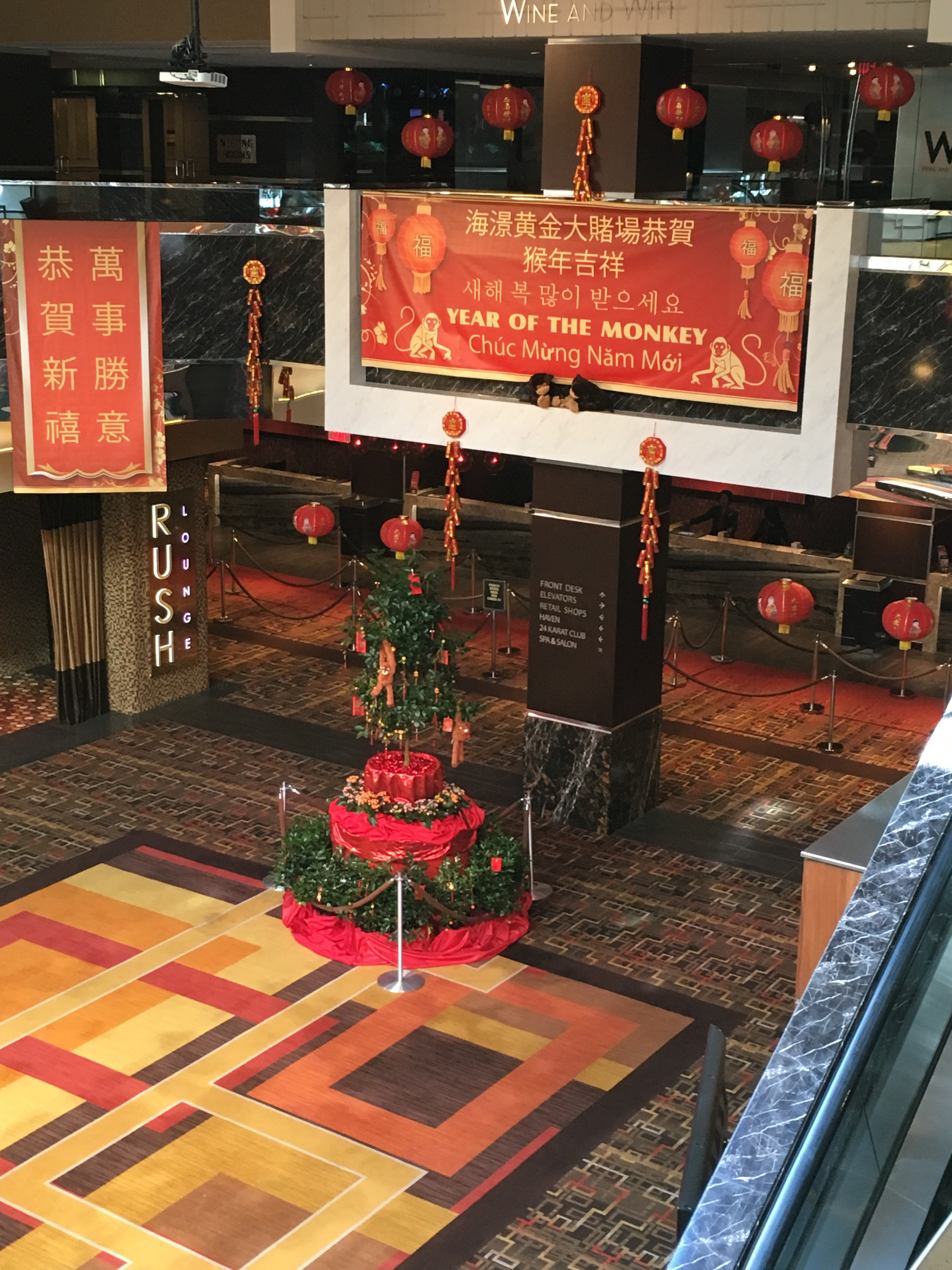
Golden Nugget Hotel lobby in 2016

Landry's purchased the property for $38 million, taking control on May 23, 2011, and renamed it the Golden Nugget Atlantic City. Landry's then spent $150 million on renovations that were completed in spring 2012, opening new restaurants and clubs and a new outdoor pool and modernizing the resort; the marina was also renovated.

On December 16, 2013, the Golden Nugget launched a real-money online casino site. Despite its late entrance into the market relative to competitors, by 2017 the online site had grown substantially, becoming the first New Jersey online casino to offer 400 games and earning more revenues than any other New Jersey online casino each month since December 2016.

The growth of Golden Nugget's online venture continued through 2018. The site consistently leads the market in revenues, and in March became the first U.S. legal online gambling site to offer 500 unique games.

In June 2022, UNITE HERE Local 54, a union representing hospitality workers in Atlantic City, encouraged its members working in the casino industry to go on strike. This strike lasted for over a month and involved almost all of the city's gambling businesses, including Golden Nugget Atlantic City.

On July 28, 2022, the Golden Nugget AC reached an agreement with the union promising higher wages, better healthcare and pension plans among other benefits. Golden Nugget was the last casino in Atlantic City to strike a deal with its employees after Tropicana, Hard Rock, Caesars, and Borgata decided to sign the contracts. Ocean Casino Resort and Bally's also accepted these terms.

== Radio transmitter ==
The roof of the Golden Nugget currently houses the transmitter tower and broadcast facilities of WWFP 90.5 FM which is licensed to Brigantine, New Jersey and is owned by the Calvary Chapel of Marlton. The station broadcasts a Christian music format. Formerly WWFP was used as a relay of Liberty University's WVRL in Elizabeth City, North Carolina.

== See also ==
- Gambling in New Jersey
- Golden Nugget Las Vegas
- Golden Nugget Laughlin
- Golden Nugget Lake Charles
- List of tallest buildings in Atlantic City
- List of integrated resorts
