= Misremembered =

American-bred Thoroughbred racehorse

- Sire: Candy Ride
- Grandsire: Ride The Rails
- Dam: Beyond Perfection
- Damsire: Quack
- Sex: Stallion
- Foaled: 15 April 2006
- Country: United States
- Colour: Chestnut
- Breeder: Bob Baffert
- Owner: Jill Baffert/ George Jacobs
- Trainer: Bob Baffert
- Record: 12: 6-4-0
- Earnings: $1,236,709

Major wins
- Indiana Derby (2009); Swaps Stakes (2009); Santa Anita Handicap (2010); Santana Mile Stakes (2011)

Misremembered (foaled 15 April 2006) is an American Thoroughbred racehorse.

== Background ==
Bred by his trainer, Bob Baffert, he is out of Beyond Perfection, a daughter of Quack (by T.V. Lark), who won the Del Mar Debutante Stakes in 1990. His sire is the undefeated Candy Ride. He is owned by Jill Baffert, wife of the trainer, and George Jacobs, owner of Georgee's Pizza in La Canada, California.

== Racing career ==
=== 2009 season ===
Misremembered did not race at age two. At age three, he broke his maiden in his second start. The only time he finished out of the money was in his first race, where he finished. His major race win came in the grade II Swaps Stakes, going wire to wire. The colt also took the grade II Indiana Derby in 2009, setting a stakes record.

=== 2010 Season ===
Misremembered made his four-year debut in early February in the Grade II Strub Stakes at Santa Anita. He lost by a neck.

On March 6, 2010, he won the $750,000 Santa Anita Handicap, holding off fast-closing Neko Bay. The victory was Misremembered's first after three consecutive runner-up finishes (in the Clark Handicap, Malibu Stakes, and Strub Stakes).

=== 2011 Season ===
Misremembered raced once as a five year old, winning the Santana Mile Stakes at Santa Anita by five lengths in 1:33.50.

== Stud record ==
Misremembered stands at Barton Thoroughbreds, Santa Ynez, California

== Pedigree ==
Pedigree of Misremembered (USA), chestnut stallion, 2006
Sire Candy Ride (ARG) 1999	Ride the Rails (USA); 1991	Cryptoclearance	Fappiano
Sire Candy Ride (ARG) 1999	Ride the Rails (USA); 1991	Cryptoclearance	Naval Orange
Sire Candy Ride (ARG) 1999	Ride the Rails (USA); 1991	Herbalesian	Herbager
Sire Candy Ride (ARG) 1999	Ride the Rails (USA); 1991	Herbalesian	Alanesian
Sire Candy Ride (ARG) 1999	Candy Girl (ARG); 1990	Candy Stripes	Blushing Groom
Sire Candy Ride (ARG) 1999	Candy Girl (ARG); 1990	Candy Stripes	Bubble Company
Sire Candy Ride (ARG) 1999	Candy Girl (ARG); 1990	City Girl	Farnesian
Sire Candy Ride (ARG) 1999	Candy Girl (ARG); 1990	City Girl	Cithara
Dam Beyond Perfection (USA) 1988	Quack (USA); 1969	T V Lark	Indian Hemp
Dam Beyond Perfection (USA) 1988	Quack (USA); 1969	T V Lark	Miss Larksfly
Dam Beyond Perfection (USA) 1988	Quack (USA); 1969	Quillon	Princequillo
Dam Beyond Perfection (USA) 1988	Quack (USA); 1969	Quillon	Nato
Dam Beyond Perfection (USA) 1988	Miss Imorullah (USA); 1970	Black Beard	Swaps
Dam Beyond Perfection (USA) 1988	Miss Imorullah (USA); 1970	Black Beard	Darby Dunedin
Dam Beyond Perfection (USA) 1988	Miss Imorullah (USA); 1970	Imorullah	Amarullah
Dam Beyond Perfection (USA) 1988	Miss Imorullah (USA); 1970	Imorullah	Jimo (Family:2-p)
