= Street Band =

American thoroughbred racehorse

- Sire: Istan
- Grandsire: Gone West
- Dam: Street Minstrel
- Damsire: Street Cry
- Sex: Mare
- Foaled: February 2, 2016
- Country: USA
- Breeder: J. Larry Jones, Cindy Jones & Ray Francis
- Owner: J. Larry Jones, Cindy Jones & Ray Francis
- Trainer: J. Larry Jones
- Jockey: Sophie Doyle
- Record: 13:5-0-3
- Earnings: $1,072,425

Major wins
- Cotillion Handicap (2019)

Street Band (foaled February 2, 2016) is an American Thoroughbred racehorse and the winner of the 2019 Cotillion Handicap.

== Career ==
Street Band's first race was on July 23, 2018, at Delaware Park, where she came in eight. She fared much better in her second race on September 3, 2018, where she won at Ellis Park.

Her 2019 season began with a win at the Fair Grounds on January 13, 2019. On March 23, 2019, she won the Grade-2 Fair Grounds Oaks. She competed in the Grade-1 2019 Kentucky Oaks, but came in 6th. She had a much better performance in July, when she won the Grade-3 Indiana Oaks.

She tried her hand at the Grade-1 2019 Alabama Stakes, in August, and came in third place. She then scored the biggest win of her career by winning the September 21st, 2019 Cotillion Handicap. The win helped her earn placement in the Grade-1 November 2, 2019 Breeders' Cup Distaff, where she finished in sixth place.

== Pedigree ==
Pedigree of Street Band (USA), 2016
Sire Istan (USA) 2002	Gone West (USA); 1984	Mr. Prospector	Raise a Native
Sire Istan (USA) 2002	Gone West (USA); 1984	Mr. Prospector	Gold Digger
Sire Istan (USA) 2002	Gone West (USA); 1984	Secrettame	Secretariat
Sire Istan (USA) 2002	Gone West (USA); 1984	Secrettame	Tamerett
Sire Istan (USA) 2002	Ronda (GB); 1996	Bluebird	Storm Bird
Sire Istan (USA) 2002	Ronda (GB); 1996	Bluebird	Ivory Dawn
Sire Istan (USA) 2002	Ronda (GB); 1996	Memorys Gold	Java Gold
Sire Istan (USA) 2002	Ronda (GB); 1996	Memorys Gold	Memory Lane
Dam Street Minstrel (USA) 2004	Street Cry (IRE); 1998	Machiavellian	Mr. Prospector
Dam Street Minstrel (USA) 2004	Street Cry (IRE); 1998	Machiavellian	Coup De Folie
Dam Street Minstrel (USA) 2004	Street Cry (IRE); 1998	Helen Street	Troy
Dam Street Minstrel (USA) 2004	Street Cry (IRE); 1998	Helen Street	Waterway
Dam Street Minstrel (USA) 2004	Minstrels Lassie (USA); 1985	The Minstrel	Northern Dancer
Dam Street Minstrel (USA) 2004	Minstrels Lassie (USA); 1985	The Minstrel	Fleur
Dam Street Minstrel (USA) 2004	Minstrels Lassie (USA); 1985	Syriasly	Damascus
Dam Street Minstrel (USA) 2004	Minstrels Lassie (USA); 1985	Syriasly	Politely
