= Majestic Star Casino =

Former casino property on lake michigan

Coordinates: 41.64°N 87.42°W

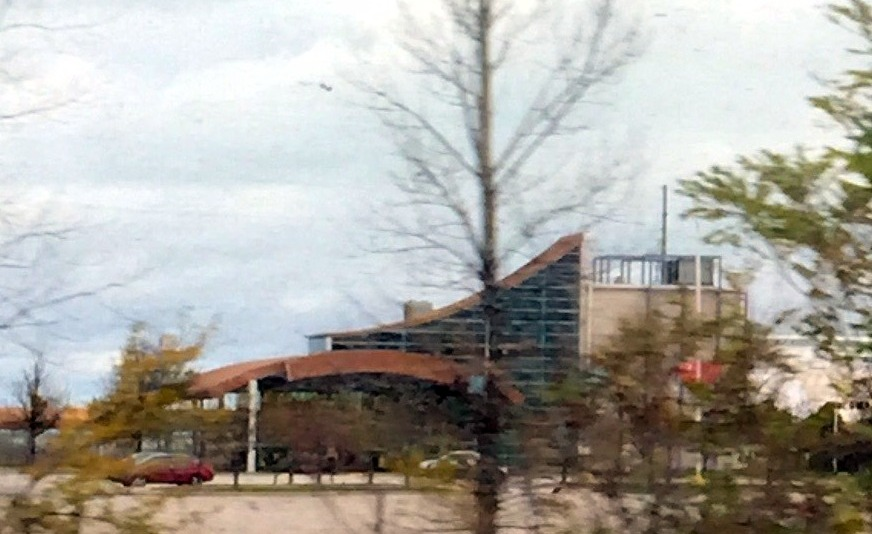
- Complex in 2016
- Interactive map of Majestic Star Casino and Hotel
- Location: United States; 1 Buffington Harbor Drive, Gary, IN 46406-3000
- Opened: June 7, 1996
- Closed: April 2021
- Owner: The Majestic Star Casino, LLC
- Website: majesticstarcasino.com

Majestic Star Casino was a casino property consisting of two gaming boats on Lake Michigan in Gary, Indiana's Buffington Harbor, owned and operated by The Majestic Star Casino, LLC. They opened in 1996 as two competing casino boats, sailing for gambling tours on alternate hours, until in 2002 Indiana legalized gambling on stationary boats. Majestic Star acquired the adjacent Trump Casino in 2007 and renamed it Majestic Star II. The two boats each had three floors of gaming, with a combined 1,900 slot machines, table games, a high-limit VIP room, a poker room, and a baccarat room. Dining options included a steakhouse and a buffet.

The casinos closed in April, 2021. One license was transferred to the Hard Rock Casino Northern Indiana, located inland in Gary.
