= Belterra Casino Resort & Spa =

Riverboat casino on the Ohio River, Indiana, U.S.

Coordinates: 38.7806°N 84.9394°W

Belterra Casino Resort

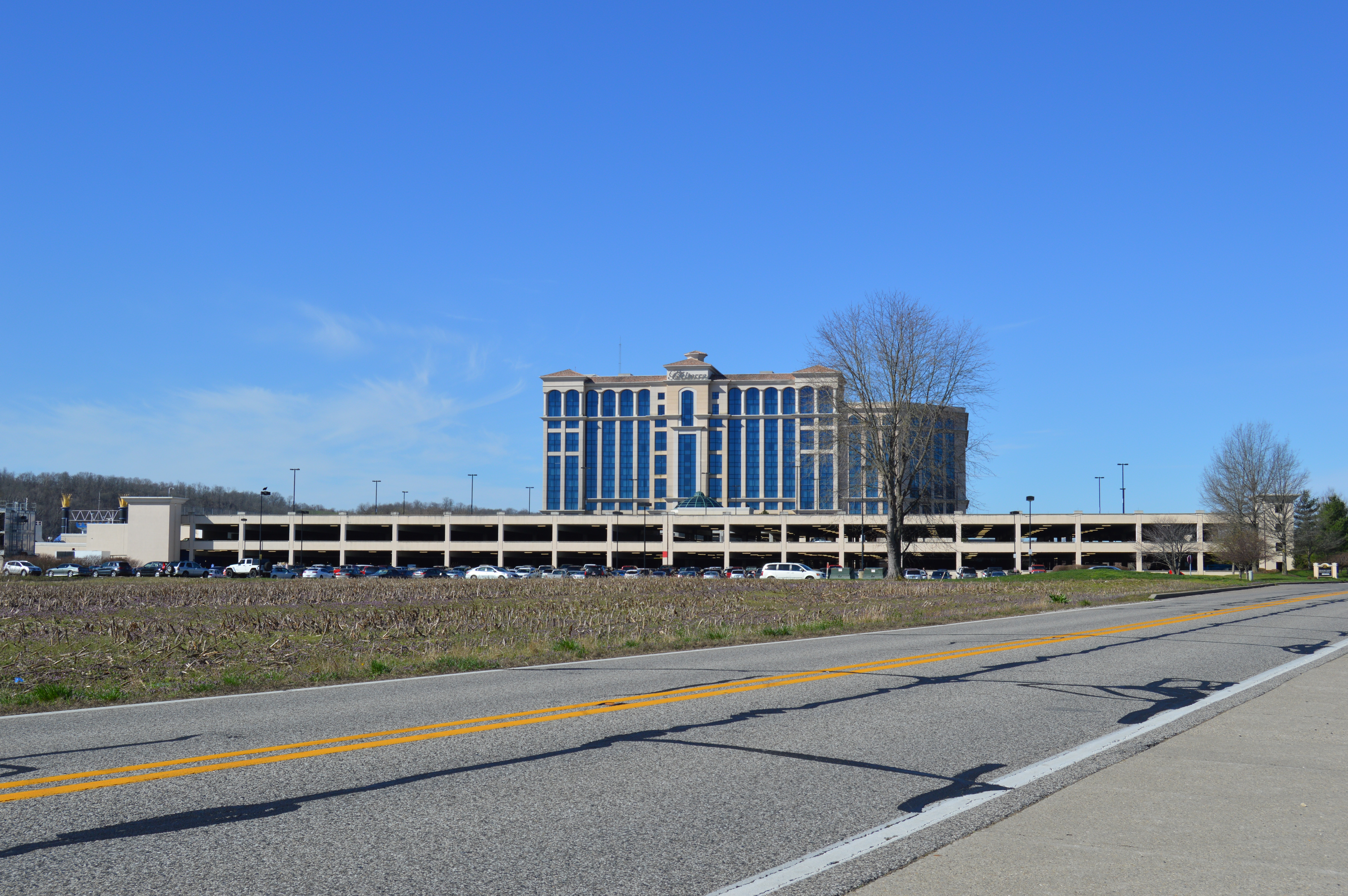
- Interactive map of Belterra Casino Resort
- Location: Florence, Indiana; 777 Belterra Drive
- Opened: October 27, 2000
- No. of rooms: 608
- Gaming space: 47,201 sq ft (4,385 m^{2})
- Notable restaurants: 19 Steak and Seafood
- Casino type: Riverboat
- Owner: Gaming and Leisure Properties
- Operating license holder: Boyd Gaming
- Website: belterracasino.com

Belterra Casino Resort & Spa is a riverboat casino near Florence, Indiana, located on the Ohio River in Switzerland County. It is roughly halfway between Louisville, Kentucky, and Cincinnati, Ohio. It is owned by Gaming and Leisure Properties and operated by Boyd Gaming.

The casino has 47,201 square feet (4,385 m^{2}) of gaming space, with 1,277 gaming devices, 45 table games, and 2 poker tables. From 2009 to 2011, the property reported annual revenue ranging between $152 and $162 million, and earnings between $27 and $30 million. Belterra is located on 315 acres (127 ha) of land, 149 acres (60 ha) of which is leased on a 50-year term. As of 2012, the property had 1,062 employees.

== History ==
In 1993, the Indiana General Assembly legalized riverboat casinos, including five licenses to be issued for sites along the Ohio River. A referendum was required in each county to approve casinos. Switzerland County voters passed such a measure in November 1993.

The Indiana Gaming Commission issued the last of the five licenses in 1998 to Hollywood Park, Inc. (later Pinnacle Entertainment) and its Boomtown subsidiary, for a $148-million project in Switzerland County, including a 12-story, 309-room hotel.

Belterra was set to open in August 2000, but was delayed when the riverboat, while en route to Indiana, collided with a barge and sank. After being repaired, the casino opened on October 27.

In April 2016, the property was sold to Gaming and Leisure Properties along with almost all of Pinnacle's real estate assets, and leased back to Pinnacle.

In October 2018, Boyd Gaming acquired Belterra's operations from Pinnacle, along with three other casinos. The sale was made to enable Penn National Gaming's acquisition of Pinnacle; the two companies together owned three casinos in Indiana (Belterra, Ameristar East Chicago, and Hollywood Casino Lawrenceburg), while state law prohibits one company from owning more than two casinos.

== See also ==
- List of casinos in Indiana
