= Larry Hovis =

American actor (1936–2003)

- Hovis in a scene from Hogan's Heroes
- Born: February 20, 1936; Wapato, Washington, U.S.
- Died: September 9, 2003 (aged 67); Austin, Texas, U.S.
- Education: University of Houston
- Occupations: Actor, singer
- Spouse: (Caroll) Ann Corrigan (m. 1955; died 1995)
- Children: 4

Larry Hovis (February 20, 1936 – September 9, 2003) was an American singer and actor best known for the 1960s television sitcom Hogan's Heroes.

== Early life and career ==
Hovis was born in Wapato, Washington, and moved to Houston, Texas, as a small child. Wapato is within the external boundaries of the Yakama Nation and is not a part of the Yakama Indian Reservation. As a youth, he was a singer, appearing on Arthur Godfrey's Talent Scouts. Hovis attended the University of Houston. During the mid-1950s, Hovis sang in nightclubs with groups including the Mascots. He wrote songs and signed with Capitol Records, which released one album. His biggest song was "We Could Have Lots of Fun". He was part of the Houston-based Bill Gannon Trio and appears on their 1959 Carlton album, Sweet Singing Swing. After his 1966 screenplay credit in the Universal film Out of Sight, Hovis began appearing in local theater productions. After some success, he moved to New York City in 1959 and appeared in the 1960 Broadway revue From A to Z, which showcased his singing and comedy talents.

== Television ==
Hovis moved to California in 1963, where he performed comedy and tried to break into television. In 1964, he was discovered by Andy Griffith's manager and was hired to appear on the TV series Gomer Pyle, U.S.M.C., where he played "Pvt. Larry Gotschalk". He also appeared on The Andy Griffith Show.

In 1965, when another actor backed out of the television show Hogan's Heroes, Hovis was cast as "Sgt. Andrew Carter", a POW in a German prison camp who was an expert on explosives. In the pilot episode, Carter was a lieutenant, and was only going to appear in that one episode. For the series, the character became Sgt. Carter, replacing a character played by Leonid Kinskey in the pilot. (Kinskey decided after the pilot that he did not want to stay with a show that had actors pretending to be Nazis.) In the series, Carter was of partial Sioux ancestry. A few sources say that Hovis was partly of Yakama Indian ancestry, but no documentation supports his membership within the Yakama Nation. Later, in an episode of the comedy Alice, Hovis played an American Indian police detective who arrests a fake American Indian conman.

While Hovis was a regular on Hogan's Heroes, he also did other work in the entertainment industry, including writing the screenplay for the 1966 spy-spoof Out of Sight. He also co-wrote Mitzi Gaynor's 1968 and 1969 television specials, and appeared in and wrote comedy bits for Rowan & Martin's Laugh-In.

== After Hogan's Heroes ==
Even before Hogan's Heroes was canceled in 1971, Hovis had already made appearances on other TV shows.

In the mid-1970s, Hovis made appearances on the game show Match Game and the comedy series Rowan & Martin's Laugh-In alongside his Hogan's Heroes castmate, Richard Dawson. Later in the decade, he produced and was a regular panelist on the game show Liar's Club.

From 1979 to 1981, Hovis toured in the musical The Best Little Whorehouse in Texas as Melvin P. Thorpe. In 1982, Hovis was a writer/producer on the show So You Think You Got Troubles, which was hosted by actor and ventriloquist Jay Johnson. Later in the decade, Hovis teamed up with Gary Bernstein to form Bernstein-Hovis Productions, which produced the game shows Anything for Money, the original version of Lingo and the short-lived Yahtzee, a TV version of the classic dice game, for which Hovis also announced and served as a regular panelist.

Hovis was hired as a co-producer for the hidden-camera television show Totally Hidden Video, but was fired by Fox executives who conducted an investigation of the pilot episode’s segments and found that three of four taped segments included paid actors and scripted content. The investigation was initially prompted by a lawsuit filed by Candid Camera creator Allen Funt, alleging that the new series was copying old Candid Camera situational contrivances.

Beginning in the 1990s, Hovis taught drama at Southwest Texas State University in San Marcos, Texas – now called Texas State University-San Marcos.

== Death ==
Hovis died of esophageal cancer in Austin, Texas, on September 9, 2003. He was 67 years old.

== Partial filmography ==
- Gomer Pyle, U.S.M.C. (1964–1965, TV series) – Larry
- The Andy Griffith Show (1965, TV series, episodes "The Case of the Punch in the Nose" and "Goober Takes a Car Apart") – Gilly Walker
- Hogan's Heroes (1965–1971, TV series) – Sgt. Andrew Carter
- Wild in the Sky (1972) – Capt. Breen
- McMillan and Wife (1972) – Mr. O’Day S2 E4
- Liar's Club (1976–1979, TV game show) – producer, regular panelist
- Alice (1977, TV series, episode "The Indian Taker") – Detective Fred Scott
- Hello, Larry (1981, TV series)
- Shadow Force (1992) – Frank Bergmann
- Yorick (2002) – Archbishop
- Lone Star State of Mind (2002) – Doctor (final film role)
