= Cotillion Handicap =

Annual American Thoroughbred horse race in Bensalem, Pennsylvania

Cotillion Stakes
- Class: Grade I
- Location: Parx Racing and Casino; Bensalem, Pennsylvania, United States
- Inaugurated: 1969
- Race type: Thoroughbred – Flat racing
- Website: www.parxracing.com

Race information
- Distance: 1 1/16 miles (8.5 furlongs)
- Surface: Dirt
- Track: left-handed
- Qualification: Three-year-old fillies
- Weight: Allowance conditions
- Purse: $1,000,000 (since 2012)

The Cotillion Stakes is an American Thoroughbred horse race held annually at Parx Racing and Casino in Bensalem, Pennsylvania. It is run in late September or early October as a prelude to the annual Breeders' Cup World Thoroughbred Championships. The race is open to three-year-old filles, willing to race one and one-sixteenth miles (eight and a half furlongs) on the dirt. The Grade I event carries a purse of US$1 million.

From 2006 to 2010 it was called the Fitz Dixon Cotillion to honor Fitz Eugene Dixon Jr. of the prominent Widener family of Philadelphia, who have been major figures in Thoroughbred racing since the early part of the 20th century.

This race was inaugurated in 1969 at Liberty Bell Park in Northeast Philadelphia before thoroughbred racing moved to the then-Keystone Racetrack (later known as Philadelphia Park) in nearby Bensalem in Bucks County, Pennsylvania. It has produced multiple Eclipse Award winners, including Shuvee, Susan's Girl, Revidere, Ashado, Havre de Grace, and Untapable. Due to the COVID-19 pandemic, no race was run in 2020.

== Records ==
Speed record:

- 1:40.93 – Havre de Grace (2010)

Most wins by a jockey:

- 4 – Mike E. Smith (2000, 2013, 2016, 2018)

Most wins by a trainer:

- 5 – Steven M. Asmussen (2012, 2014, 2018, 2021, 2022)

Most wins by an owner:

- 3 – Fox Hill Farms (2000, 2010, 2016)

== Winners ==
Year	Winner	Jockey	Trainer	Owner	Time
2026	Bodacious Bay	Micah Husbands Jr.	Saffie A. Joseph Jr.	C2 Racing Stable, Miller Racing LLC, St Elias Stable, Mathis Stable, BAG Stables, Carr Legacy Racing & Steve Taub	1:43.60
2025	Clicquot	Irad Ortiz Jr.	Brenden P. Walsh	X Men Racing IV, Madaket Stables, & SF Racing	1:42.85
2024	Thorpedo Anna	Bryan J Hernandez	Kenneth G. McPeek	Brookdale Racing, Inc.	1:45.45
2023	Ceiling Crusher	Edwin A. Maldonado	Doug O'Neill	Wonderland Racing Stables, Todd Cady, Tim Kasparoff & Ty Leatherman	1:45.69
2022	Society	Florent Geroux	Steven M. Asmussen	Peter E. Blum Thoroughbreds	1:42.94
2021	Clairiere	Ricardo Santana Jr.	Steven M. Asmussen	Stonestreet Stables	1:44.31
2019	Street Band	Sophie Doyle	J. Larry Jones	Ray Francis, Cindy Jones, J. Larry Jones, Medallion Racing & MyRaceHorse Stable	1:44.20
2018	Midnight Bisou	Mike E. Smith	Steven M. Asmussen	Bloom Racing Stable, Madaket Stables, Allen Racing	1:45.95
2017	It Tiz Well	Drayden Van Dyke	Jerry Hollendorfer	Tommy Town Thoroughbreds LLC	1:43.67
2016	Songbird	Mike E. Smith	Jerry Hollendorfer	Fox Hill Farms	1:44.02
2015	I'm a Chatterbox	Florent Geroux	J. Larry Jones	Carolyn & Fletcher Gray	1:44.48
2014	Untapable	Rosie Napravnik	Steven M. Asmussen	Winchell Thoroughbreds	1:42.30
2013	Close Hatches	Mike E. Smith	William I. Mott	Juddmonte Farms	1:44.03
2012	My Miss Aurelia	Corey Nakatani	Steven M. Asmussen	Stonestreet Stables & George Bolton	1:44.54
2011	Plum Pretty	Rafael Bejarano	Bob Baffert	Peach Tree Stable	1:41.19
2010	Havre de Grace	Jeremy Rose	Anthony W. Dutrow	Fox Hill Farms Inc.	1:40.93
2009	Careless Jewel	Robert Landry	Josie Carroll	Donver Stables	1:41.40
2008	Seattle Smooth	Jose Lezcano	Anthony W. Dutrow	Mercedes Stable	1:42.58
2007	Bear Now	Jerry Baird	Reade Baker	Bear Stables	1:41.21
2006	India	Joe Bravo	Todd A. Pletcher	Lyon Stables	1:43.26
2005	Nothing But Fun	Richard Migliore	Mike Hushion	Barry K. Schwartz	1:46.64
2004	Ashado	Eibar Coa	Todd A. Pletcher	Starlight Racing	1:41.68
2003	Fast Cookie	Nick Santagata	William I. Mott	Stonerside Stable	1:45.83
2002	Smok'n Frolic	José Vélez Jr.	Todd A. Pletcher	Dogwood Stable	1:44.27
2001	Mystic Lady	Eibar Coa	Mark Hennig	Lee Lewis	1:43.86
2000	Jostle	Mike E. Smith	John Servis	Fox Hill Farms	1:42.54
1999	Skipping Around	Mike McCarthy	Robert W. Camac	Arthur I. Appleton	1:43.45
1998	Lu Ravi	Willie Martinez	Carl Bowman	Fujita Yoshio	1:43.55
1997	Snit	Robert Colton	Barclay Tagg	William M. Backer	1:43.91
1996	Double Dee's	Filiberto Leon	James W. Ferraro	Tri Bone Stable	1:44.69
1995	Clear Mandate	José C. Ferrer	George R. Arnold	G. Watts Humphrey Jr.	1:42.87
1994	Sovereign Kitty	Herb McCauley	Richard Schosberg	Heatherwood Farm	1:43.52
1993	Jacody	Tommy Turner	L. William Donovan	Minranshe Nanbri Stable	1:43.22
1992	Star Minister	Andrea Seefeldt	Richard W. Small	Robert E. Meyerhoff	1:44.06
1991	No Race				
1990	Valay Maid	Lazaro Saumell	Carlos Garcia	Mrs. Frank Wright	1:43.80
1989	Sharp Dance	Kelly Castaneda	Patricia Clifton	Francis Ogden	1:45.80
1988	Aquaba	Jean Cruguet	Scotty Schulhofer	King Ranch	1:44.40
1987	Silent Turn †	Randy Romero	Angel Penna Sr.	Dennis Diaz	1:42.80
1986	Toes Knows	Danny Wright	James P. Simpson	James P. Simpson	1:42.80
1985	Koluctoo's Jill	Herb McCauley	Robert Levine	Robert Levine	1:42.80
1984	Squan Song	Ruben Hernandez	Carlos Garcia	Due Process Stable	1:42.80
1984	Dowery	Vince Bracciale Jr.	Frank A. Alexander	D. L. Brooks	
1983	Quixotic Lady	Chris McCarron	Woody Stephens	Ross Valley Farm	1:42.80
1982	Lady Eleanor	Craig Perret	Bruce N. Levine	Brandy Hills Farm	1:45.00
1981	Truly Bound	Ronnie Franklin	Bud Delp	Windfields Farm	1:42.80
1980	Sugar and Spice	Georges Martens	John M. Veitch	Calumet Farm	1:45.00
1979	Alada	Jeffrey Fell	R. G. Van Wert	Meadow Stable	1:43.80
1978	Queen Lib	Don MacBeth	Harry Wells	Raritan Stable	1:43.20
1977	Suede Shoe	Tony Black	Frank Whiteley Jr.	Peter M. Brant	1:42.60
1976	Revidere	Jacinto Vásquez	David A. Whiteley	W. Haggin Perry	1:44.00
1975	My Juliet	Don Brumfield	Leland G. Ripley	George Weasel Jr.	1:43.60
1974	Honky Star	Darrel McHargue	David R. Vance	Dan Lasater	1:44.00
1973	Lilac Hill	Don MacBeth	Tom Harraway	Michael C. Erlanger	1:43.60
1972	Susan's Girl	Victor Tejada	John W. Russell	Fred W. Hooper	1:44.20
1971	Alma North	Frank Lovato	Frank Zitto	East Acres Stable	1:43.60
1970	Office Queen	John L. Rotz	Budd Lepman	Stephen A. Calder	1:44.00
1969	Shuvee	Jesse Davidson	Willard C. Freeman	Anne Minor Stone	1:43.20

† In 1987, Sacahuista won the race but was disqualified for interference and set back to second.

† In 2018, Monomoy Girl won the race but was disqualified for interference and set back to second.
