= West Virginia Derby =

Thoroughbred horse race

- Class: Grade III
- Location: Mountaineer Park; Chester, West Virginia, United States
- Inaugurated: 1923 (as Huntington Tri-State Park)
- Race type: Thoroughbred - Flat racing
- Website: Mountaineer Park

Race information
- Distance: 1 1/8 miles (9 furlongs)
- Surface: Dirt
- Track: left-handed
- Qualification: Three-year-olds
- Weight: 124 lbs. with allowances
- Purse: $400,000 (since 2025)

The West Virginia Derby is an American Grade III stakes race for three-year-old Thoroughbred race horses run over a distance of 1 1/8 miles on the dirt at Mountaineer Race Track in Chester, West Virginia in August. The purse for the event is US$400,000.

== History ==
The inaugural running of the event was 21 April 1923, the ninth race day at the newly opened Huntingdon's Tri-State Park. Estimates put the crowd size at 10,000. Huntington's hotel rooms were so solidly booked that 50 people applied at the city jail for lodging. Tender Seth defeated six other entrants as the 6-4 favorite in a time of 1:54 3/5. In 1925 Tri-State Park renamed its premier event to the Huntington Derby over a shorter distance of 1 1/16 miles. On 17 April 1926 the event was renewed as The West Virginia State Derby and was won by Nine Sixty who defeated the inaugural Florida Derby winner Torcher by 1 1/2 lengths. Tri-State management were planning a rematch of between Nine Sixty and Torcher four days after this running but a catastrophe ensued with a fire engulfing the Tri-State grandstand on the morning of 20 April. The race meet was canceled and Tri-State Park was never rebuilt.

After a 32-year absence the event was renewed on 23 August 1958 at Wheeling Downs. The event was held three times at Wheeling Downs before being moved to Waterford Park in 1963. The first four winners of the event were all ridden by jockey Floyd Green and trained by local trainer Patsy Santo. Including two fillies, the 1963 winner Etimota who won by twelve lengths and Kerensa in 1966 who were sisters (Rico Monte (ARG) — Too Fussy out of Blue Sword). Both were bred and owned by Frances W. Luro, wife of legendary trainer Horatio Luro at their Old Mill Farm in Carterville, Georgia. Both in reality were trained by Canadian Horse Racing Hall of Fame trainer Frank H. Merrill Jr., but ran in the name of local trainer Patsy Santo.

The event has been run in split divisions twice - in 1972 and 1981.

The event was discontinued twice for lengthy periods in the 1980s and 1990s.

With influx of racino funds Mountaineer Park management was able to provide higher stakes and with that stability to the event in the 2000s.

In 2002 the event was classified as Grade III and upgraded to Grade II in 2009. However the event was downgraded back to Grade III in 2017.

In 2020 due to the COVID-19 pandemic in the United States, Mountaineer Park canceled the event.

== Records ==
Speed record:

- 1 1/8 miles: 1:46:29 - Soto (2003) (Stakes and track record)

Margins:

- 12 lengths – Etimota (1963)

Most wins by a jockey:

- 4 - Floyd Green (1963, 1964, 1965, 1966)

Most wins by a trainer:

- 6 – Steven M. Asmussen (2005, 2007, 2009, 2012, 2015, 2023)

Most wins by an owner:

- 3 – Winchell Thoroughbreds (2007, 2014, 2023)

== Winners ==
Year	Winner	Jockey	Trainer	Owner	Distance	Time	Purse	Grade	Ref
At ‡Mountaineer Race Track – West Virginia Derby
2026	Zihnal	John R. Velazquez	Jonathan Thomas	Augustin Stables	1 1/8 miles	1:52.47	$400,000	III	
2025	Chunk of Gold	Jareth Loveberry	Ethan West	Terry L. Stephens	1 1/8 miles	1:50.97	$400,000	III	
2024	Dragoon Guard	Florent Geroux	Brad H. Cox	Juddmonte Farms	1 1/8 miles	1:49.96	$500,000	III	
2023	Red Route One	Cristian Torres	Steven M. Asmussen	Winchell Thoroughbreds	1 1/8 miles	1:49.49	$500,000	III	
2022	Skippylongstocking	Edwin Gonzalez	Saffie A. Joseph Jr.	Daniel Alonso	1 1/8 miles	1:48.11	$500,000	III	
2021	Mr. Wireless	Ramon Vazquez	W. Bret Calhoun	JIL Stable	1 1/8 miles	1:52.49	$500,000	III	
2020	Race not held								
2019	Mr. Money	Gabriel Saez	W. Bret Calhoun	Allied Racing Stable	1 1/8 miles	1:50.28	$500,000	III	
2018	Mr Freeze	Robby Albarado	Dale L. Romans	Jim Bakke & Gerald Isbister	1 1/8 miles	1:47.95	$500,000	III	
2017	Colonelsdarktemper	Jon Court	William H. Fires	Anthony J. Foyt Jr.	1 1/8 miles	1:50.68	$750,000	III	
2016	Cupid	Rafael Bejarano	Bob Baffert	Derrick Smith, Mrs. John Magnier & Michael Tabor	1 1/8 miles	1:50.54	$750,000	II	
2015	Madefromlucky	Joe Bravo	Todd A. Pletcher	Cheyenne Stables & Mac Nichol	1 1/8 miles	1:51.40	$750,000	II	
2014	Tapiture	Rosie Napravnik	Steven M. Asmussen	Winchell Thoroughbreds	1 1/8 miles	1:50.66	$750,000	II	
2013	Departing	Robby Albarado	Albert Stall Jr.	Claiborne Farm & Adele B. Dilschneider	1 1/8 miles	1:51.47	$750,000	II	
2012	Macho Macho	Corey Nakatani	Steven M. Asmussen	Jerry Durant	1 1/8 miles	1:49.98	$750,000	II	
2011	Prayer for Relief	Rafael Bejarano	Bob Baffert	Gerry Aschinger	1 1/8 miles	1:50.68	$750,000	II	
2010	Concord Point	Martin Garcia	Bob Baffert	Kaleem Shah	1 1/8 miles	1:51.12	$750,000	II	
2009	§ Soul Warrior	Dale V. Beckner	Steven M. Asmussen	Zayat Stables	1 1/8 miles	1:51.46	$750,000	II	
2008	Ready Set	Julien R. Leparoux	Michael R. Matz	Lael Stables	1 1/8 miles	1:52.03	$750,000	III	
2007	Zanjero	Shaun Bridgmohan	Steven M. Asmussen	Winchell Thoroughbreds	1 1/8 miles	1:53.04	$750,000	III	
2006	Bright One	Mark Guidry	Dale L. Romans	Carolyn S. Bruder & Delmar Daubs	1 1/8 miles	1:50.08	$750,000	III	
2005	Real Dandy	Mark Guidry	Steven M. Asmussen	Cathy & Bob Zollars	1 1/8 miles	1:50.29	$750,000	III	
2004	Sir Shackleton	Rafael Bejarano	Nicholas P. Zito	Tracy Farmer	1 1/8 miles	1:49.16	$600,000	III	
2003	Soto	Ramon A. Dominguez	Michael W. Dickinson	Galopp	1 1/8 miles	1:46.29	$600,000	III	
2002	Wiseman's Ferry	Jorge F. Chavez	Niall M. O'Callaghan	Swifty Farm, Morton Fink & Lee Sacks	1 1/8 miles	1:49.63	$600,000	III	
2001	Western Pride	Dana G. Whitney	Richard Estvanko	Theresa McArthur	1 1/8 miles	1:47.20	$500,000	Listed	
2000	Mass Market	Rick Wilson	Benjamin W. Perkins Jr.	New Farm, Centennial Farm & William S. Farish III	1 1/8 miles	1:49.94	$300,000	Listed	
1999	Stellar Brush	Joe Stokes	Richard W. Small	Robert E. Meyerhoff	1 1/8 miles	1:49.02	$250,000	Listed	
1998	Da Devil	Jon Court	Forrest Kaelin	David Hall, B. Case, C. Glasscock & B. Bleiden	1 1/8 miles	1:48.84	$200,000	Listed	
1991–1997		Race not held							
1990	Challenge My Duty	Inocencio Becer Ayarza	Norman R. Pointer	William M. Rickman	1 1/8 miles	1:49.60	$100,000		
1989	Doc's Leader	William I. Fox Jr.	Monte Clark	Mary Anne Loccissano	1 1/8 miles	1:50.00	$100,000		
1988	Old Stories	Ruben Hernandez	Howard M. Tesher	Russell L. Reineman	1 1/8 miles	1:52.20	$100,000		
1982–1987		Race not held							
1981	Park's Policy	Jeffrey Scott Lloyd	Clyde D. Rice	Parke L. Lietzel	1 1/8 miles	1:49.60	$35,000		Division 1
1981	Johnny Dance	Frank Lovato Jr.	John P. Campo	Buckland Farm	1 1/8 miles	1:47.80	$35,000		Division 2
1980	Summer Advocate	William L. Floyd	Michael B. Ball	Donald Ball	1 1/8 miles	1:50.80	$50,000		
1979	Architect	Stanley Spencer	Harvey L. Vanier	Carl Lauer	1 1/8 miles	1:51.00	$50,000		
1978	Beau Sham	Pat Day	Thomas E. Lunneen	Chet & Gerry Herringer	1 1/8 miles	1:48.60	$50,000		
1977	§ Best Person	Vincent Bracciale Jr.	Michael D. Tinker	W. Cal Partee	1 1/8 miles	1:48.60	$50,000		
1976	Wardlaw	Jorge Enrique Tejeira	David R. Vance	Dan Lasater	1 1/8 miles	1:47.60	$50,000		
1975	At The Front	Angel Santiago	John P. Campo	Buckland Farm	1 1/8 miles	1:48.60	$50,000		
1974	Park Guard	Benny Feliciano	Jonathan E. Sheppard	Augustin Stable	1 1/8 miles	1:47.40	$50,000		
1973	Blue Chip Dan	Mickey Solomone	George Getz	Phil Teinowitz	1 1/8 miles	1:49.20	$32,200		
1972	Family Table	Mickey Solomone	George Getz	Phil Teinowitz	1 1/8 miles	1:50.60	$20,000		Division 1
1972	Bold Nobleman	James Kelley	Andrew G. Smithers	Mrs. C. H. Sturrock Stable	1 1/8 miles	1:49.40	$20,500		Division 2
1971	Trico O'Erin	Thomas De Palo	Millard H. Harrell	Mrs. Joy Glassberg	1 1/8 miles	1:52.20	$28,900		
1970	† Two Joy	Joseph Imparato	Jake Dodson	Audley Farms	1 1/8 miles	1:53.00	$28,050		
1969	Roman Partner	Mickey Solomone	Kenneth W. Bright	James Livesay & Lou Kelley	1 1/8 miles	1:51.80	$27,375		
1968	Chargertown	Raymond Nakama	A. O. Cleff	Mrs. Walter R. Kelly	1 1/8 miles	1:54.40	$15,670		
1967	Miracle Hill	Robert Gallimore	Dewey Smith	T. Alie & James E. Grissom	1 1/8 miles	1:53.20	$8,460		
1966	ƒ Kerensa	Floyd Green	Patsy Santo	Mrs. Horatio Luro	1 1/8 miles	1:50.40	$8,420		
1965	Pantuity	Floyd Green	Patsy Santo	Andrew G. Smithers	1 1/8 miles	1:53.00	$8,310		
1964	Peter Le Grand	Floyd Green	Patsy Santo	Mrs. Edward B. Seedhouse	1 1/8 miles	1:53.00	$5,045		
1963	ƒ Etimota	Floyd Green	Patsy Santo	Mrs. Horatio Luro	1 1/8 miles	1:52.00	$5,940		
1962	Race not held								
At Wheeling Downs
1961	Dip and Whirl	Bernie Walt	Thurmond Gammon	Thurmond Gammon	1 1/8 miles	1:54.60	$4,020		
1960	Race not held								
1959	Redbird Wish	Wayne Chambers	Marion H. Van Berg	Marion H. Van Berg	1 1/8 miles	1:52.80	$14,620		
1958	Sea Hymn	Jose Contraes	Ed Barerra	Circle K Farms	1 1/8 miles	1:55.20	$15,000		
1927–1957		Race not held							
At Huntington Tri-State Park – West Virginia State Derby
1926	Nine Sixty	Louis Pinchon	J. L. Brannon	Mrs. J. L. Brannon	1 1/16 miles	1:49.40	$1,500		
Huntington Derby
1925	Belpre	Francis Horn	O. E. Pons	C. G. Talbutt	1 1/16 miles	1:48.40	$1,500		
West Virginia Derby
1924	ƒ Norah	Willy Martin	Charles H. Smith	Charles H. Smith	1 1/8 miles	1:54.60	$1,500		
1923	Tender Seth	Willy Fronk	H. Cavanaugh	E. C. Knebelkamp	1 1/8 miles	1:54.60	$2,265		

Notes:
ƒ Filly or Mare
§ Ran as an entry
‡ When the event was run between 1963 and 1981 the track was known as Waterford Park
† In the 1971 running, Captain Nash was first past the post but was disqualified for interference in the straight and Two Joy was declared the winner

== See also ==
List of American and Canadian Graded races
