= Indiana Derby =

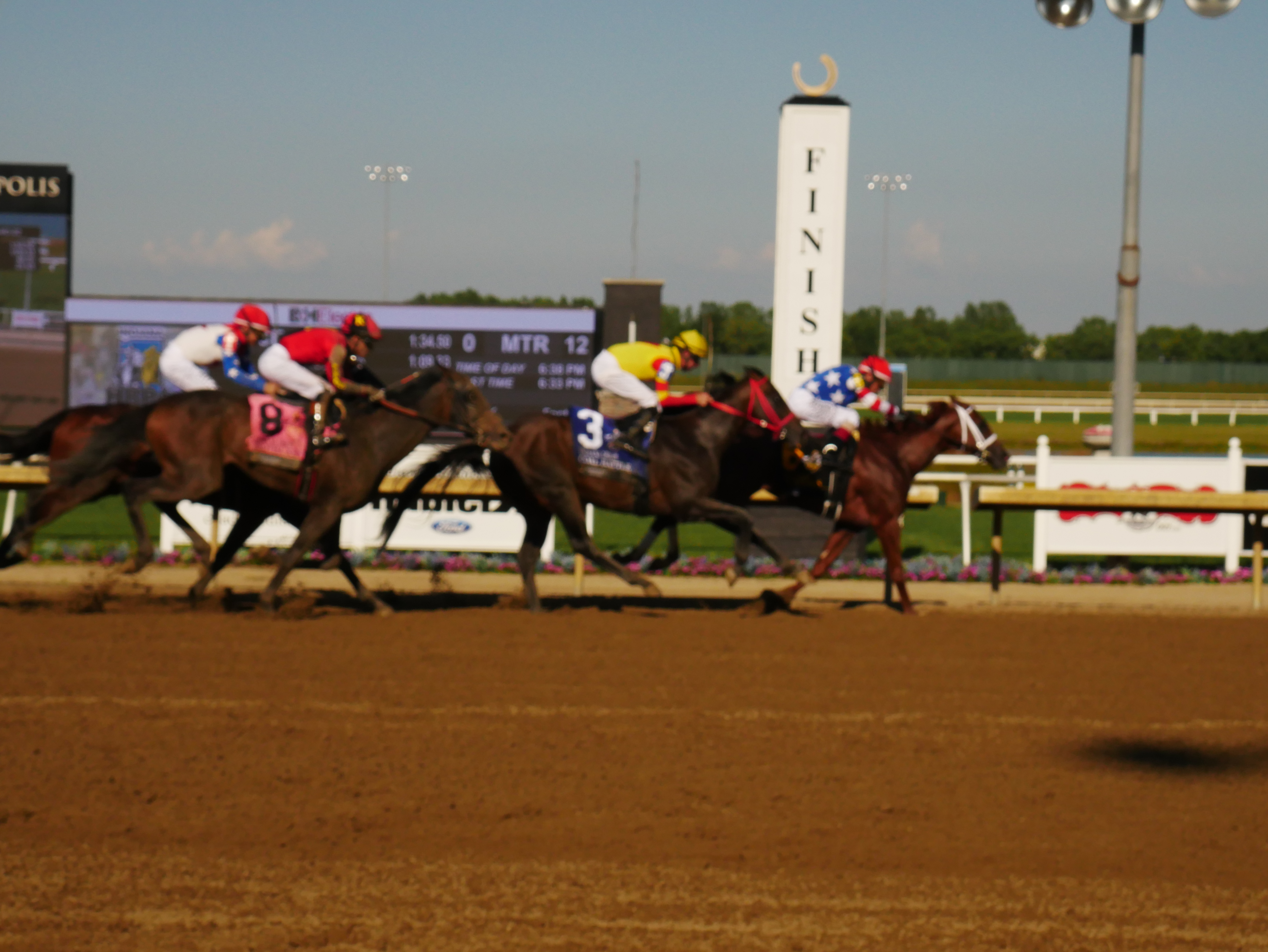
- Race 12 crossing the finish line, 2025
- Class: Grade III
- Location: Horseshoe Indianapolis; Shelbyville, Indiana, United States
- Inaugurated: 1995
- Race type: Thoroughbred - Flat racing
- Website: www.caesars.com/horseshoe-indianapolis

Race information
- Distance: 1 1/16 miles
- Surface: Dirt
- Track: left-handed
- Qualification: Three-year-olds
- Weight: 124 lbs with allowances
- Purse: $300,000 (since 2020)

The Indiana Derby is a Grade III American Thoroughbred horse race for three-year-olds run over a distance of 1 1/16 miles on the dirt held annually in July at Horseshoe Indianapolis in Shelbyville, Indiana. It is the racetrack's signature event offering its current highest purse at $300,000.

== History ==
The event was inaugurated on 7 October 1995 at Hoosier Park and was won by Dogwood Stable's Peruvian who was the second part of trainer Peter Vestal's entry in a time of 1:43 flat on a fast track.

The event was upgraded to Grade III in 2002 and in 2004 to Grade II. It held this classification until 2017 when the event was downgraded back to Grade III.

The dead heat in the 2006 running was the first dead heat for the Indiana Derby. The result was contested by the owners of Star Dabbler who came out of the race injured. They believed he won the race so took the issue to arbitration but the result was upheld.

The 2009 win by Misremembered set a new track record. 2010 marked a groundbreaking year for the Indiana Derby and racing in the state of Indiana when Lookin At Lucky became the first winner of a Triple Crown race ever to race in the state of Indiana. Sent off at odds of 2–5, Lookin At Lucky won the race by 1 1/4 lengths in last-to-first fashion much to the delight of the ontrack crowd.

In 2013 the event was moved to Indiana Grand, now known as Horseshoe Indianapolis. Since 2015, the race has been held in July.

Bob Baffert became the first trainer to win the race two years in a row in 2009 and 2010 with Misremembered and Lookin At Lucky. He won his third Indiana Derby with Power Broker in 2013, and his fourth with Cupid in 2016.

In 2020 the event was run over the 1 1/8 miles distance however the following year this distance was reverted to 1 1/16 miles.

== Records ==
Speed record:

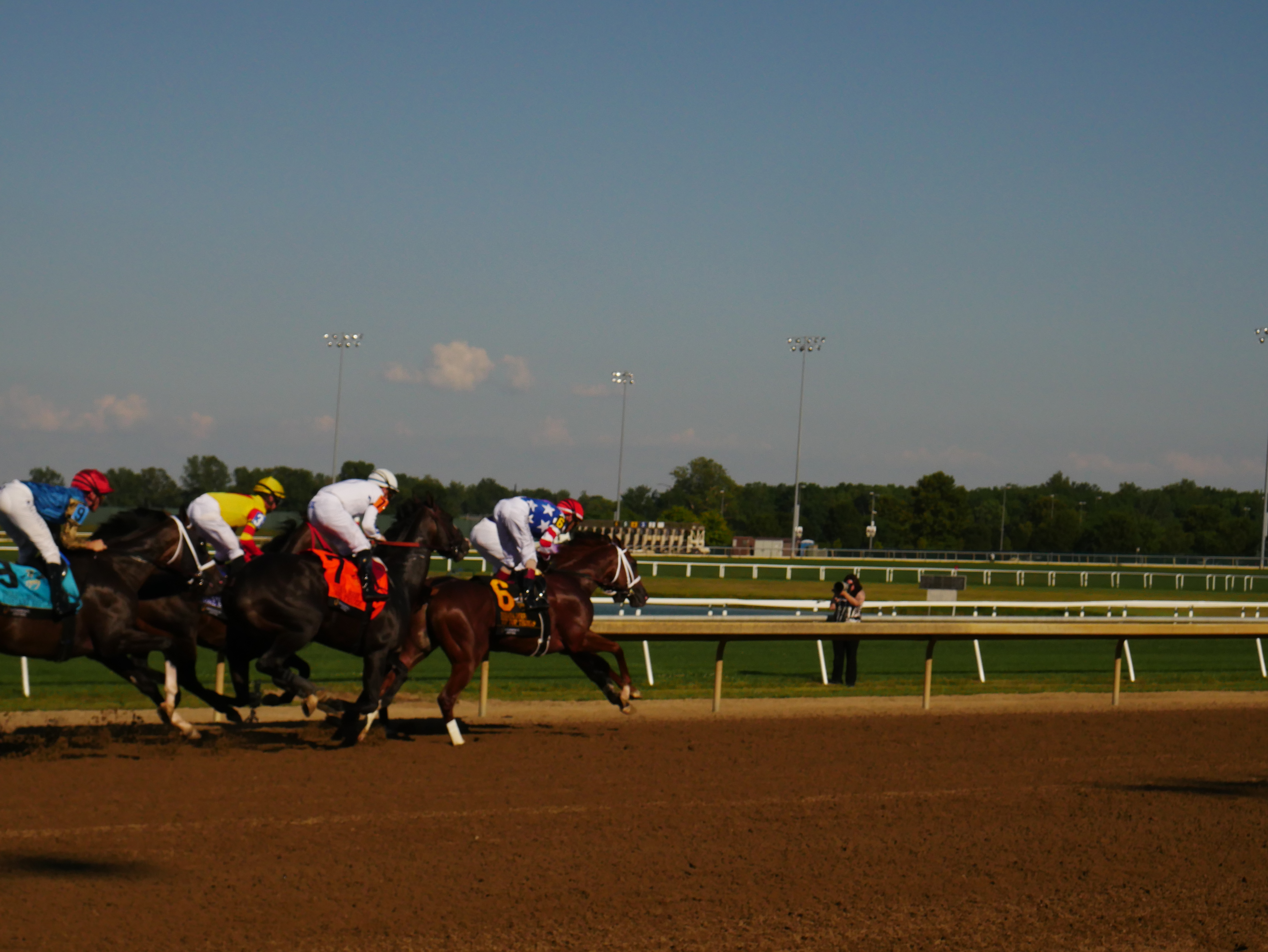
Tip Top Thomas (6) at the 2025 Indiana Derby

- 1:40.80 - Misremembered (2009, at Hoosier Park)
- 1:41.15 - Tip Top Thomas (2025, at the Indiana Grand Race Course)

Margins:

- 5 lengths – Irap (2017)

Most wins by a jockey:

- 3 - Robby Albarado (1998, 2001, 2007)
- 3 - Florent Geroux (2018, 2020, 2024)

Most wins by a trainer:

- 4 - Bob Baffert (2009, 2010, 2013, 2016)
- 4 - Brad H. Cox (2020, 2023, 2024, 2026)

Most wins by an owner:

- 2 - Derrick Smith, Mrs. John Magnier & Michael Tabor (2016, 2023)

== Winners ==
Year	Winner	Jockey	Trainer	Owner	Distance	Time	Purse	Grade	Ref
At Horseshoe Indianapolis (Indiana Grand Race Course)
2026	Leading Change	Irad Ortiz Jr.	Brad H. Cox	Wathnan Racing	1 1/16 miles	1:41.36	$300,000	III	
2025	Tip Top Thomas	John R. Velazquez	Todd A. Pletcher	James J. Bakke & Gerald Isbister	1 1/16 miles	1:41.15	$300,000	III	
2024	Dragoon Guard	Florent Geroux	Brad H. Cox	Juddmonte Farms	1 1/16 miles	1:42.26	$300,000	III	
2023	Verifying	Marcelino Pedroza Jr.	Brad H. Cox	Derrick Smith, Mrs. John Magnier, Michael Tabor, Jonathan Poulin & Westerburg	1 1/16 miles	1:43.15	$300,000	III	
2022	Actuator	James Graham	Michael W. McCarthy	Black Type Thoroughbreds, Rags Racing Stables, Rick Howard & Gavin O'Connor	1 1/16 miles	1:44.48	$300,000	III	
2021	Mr. Wireless	Ramon Vazquez	W. Bret Calhoun	Jon Lapczenski & JIL Stable	1 1/16 miles	1:42.84	$300,000	III	
2020	Shared Sense	Florent Geroux	Brad H. Cox	Godolphin Racing	1 1/8 miles	1:49.46	$300,000	III	
2019	Mr. Money	Gabriel Saez	W. Bret Calhoun	Allied Racing Stable	1 1/16 miles	1:41.80	$500,000	III	
2018	Axelrod	Florent Geroux	Michael W. McCarthy	Slam Dunk Racing	1 1/16 miles	1:43.00	$500,000	III	
2017	Irap	Mario Gutierrez	Doug F. O'Neill	Reddam Racing	1 1/16 miles	1:42.21	$500,000	III	
2016	Cupid	Rafael Bejarano	Bob Baffert	Michael Tabor, Mrs. John Magnier & Derrick Smith	1 1/16 miles	1:43.02	$512,000	II	
2015	Tiz Shea D	Jose Lezcano	William I. Mott	Brous Stable, Wachtel Stable & Gary Barber	1 1/16 miles	1:43.02	$508,000	II	
2014	East Hall	Luis Saez	William A. Kaplan	Jack H. Hendricks & Roger Justice	1 1/16 miles	1:42.24	$507,100	II	
2013	Power Broker	Martin Garcia	Bob Baffert	Gary & Mary West	1 1/16 miles	1:41.95	$514,000	II	
At Hoosier Park
2012	Neck 'n Neck	Brian Hernandez Jr.	Ian R. Wilkes	A. Stevens Miles Jr.	1 1/16 miles	1:42.71	$513,600	II	
2011	Wilburn	Julien R. Leparoux	Steven M. Asmussen	Stonestreet Stables	1 1/16 miles	1:43.60	$510,900	II	
2010	Lookin at Lucky	Martin Garcia	Bob Baffert	Mike Pegram, Karl Watson & Paul Weitman	1 1/16 miles	1:43.40	$510,900	II	
2009	Misremembered	Victor Espinoza	Bob Baffert	Jill Baffert & George Jacobs	1 1/16 miles	1:40.80	$512,600	II	
2008	Tin Cup Chalice	Pedro A. Rodriguez	Michael A. LeCesse	Michael A. Lecesse & Scott van Laer	1 1/16 miles	1:45.00	$514,100	II	
2007	Zanjero	Robby Albarado	Steven M. Asmussen	Winchell Thoroughbreds	1 1/16 miles	1:43.95	$510,600	II	
2006	Cielo Gold	Brian Hernandez Jr.	Hal R. Wiggins	Hillcrest Farm Racing	1 1/16 miles	1:42.84	$513,200	II	DH
2006	Star Dabbler	Richard Migliore	Michael E. Hushion	Barry K. Schwartz	1 1/16 miles	1:42.84	$513,200	II	DH
2005	Don't Get Mad	Brice Blanc	Ronald W. Ellis	B. Wayne Hughes	1 1/16 miles	1:42.71	$511,300	II	
2004	Brass Hat	Willie Martinez	William B. Bradley	Fred F. Bradley	1 1/16 miles	1:44.04	$511,300	II	
2003	Excessivepleasure	Jon Court	Doug F. O'Neill	Lee & Ty Leatherman	1 1/16 miles	1:43.48	$411,800	III	
2002	Perfect Drift	Jon Court	Murray W. Johnson	Stonecrest Farm	1 1/16 miles	1:43.50	$414,700	III	
2001	Orientate	Robby Albarado	D. Wayne Lukas	Bob & Beverly Lewis	1 1/16 miles	1:42.22	$314,100	Listed	
2000	Mister Deville	Luis S. Quinonez	Wilson L. Brown	Darwin Olson	1 1/16 miles	1:41.80	$307,500	Listed	
1999	Forty One Carats	Jorge F. Chavez	David Fawkes	Walter L. New & Jack T. Hammer	1 1/16 miles	1:42.24	$313,500	Listed	
1998	One Bold Stroke	Robby Albarado	James E. Baker	Landon Knight & Mary Lu Noon	1 1/16 miles	1:43.14	$314,500	Listed	
1997	Dubai Dust	Sidney P. LeJeune Jr.	D. Wayne Lukas	Gonzalo B. Torrealba	1 1/16 miles	1:44.00	$212,400	Listed	
1996	Canyon Run	Francisco C. Torres	Steven L. Morguelan	Marco Bommarito	1 1/16 miles	1:41.40	$107,600	Listed	
1995	§ Peruvian	Dean Kutz	Peter M. Vestal	Dogwood Stable	1 1/16 miles	1:43.00	$111,500	Listed	

Notes:
§ Ran as part of an entry

== See also ==
List of American and Canadian Graded races
