= Cupid (horse) =

American-bred Thoroughbred racehorse

- Sire: Tapit
- Grandsire: Pulpit
- Dam: Pretty 'n Smart
- Damsire: Beau Genius
- Sex: Stallion
- Foaled: May 19, 2013
- Country: United States
- Colour: Gray
- Breeder: JKG Thoroughbreds
- Owner: Michael Tabor, Mrs. John Magnier and Derrick Smith
- Trainer: Bob Baffert
- Record: 13: 6-1-0
- Earnings: $1,701,873

Major wins
- Rebel Stakes (2016); Indiana Derby (2016); West Virginia Derby (2016); Gold Cup at Santa Anita (2017); Harry F. Brubaker Stakes (2017)
- Last updated on November 11, 2017

Cupid (foaled May 19, 2013) is a retired American Thoroughbred racehorse and active breeding stallion who won multiple graded stakes races despite several interruptions to his training. At age three, he was a leading contender for the 2016 Kentucky Derby until he developed a breathing problem and missed the race. Returning later in the year, he won the Indiana and West Virginia Derbies before finishing eighth in the Pennsylvania Derby. After an eight-month layoff, he returned in May 2017 to win the Grade I Gold Cup at Santa Anita. He finished his career with six wins from thirteen starts and earnings of $1.7 million.

== Background ==
Cupid is a gray horse, a color he inherited from leading sire Tapit, whose other offspring include the 2014 and 2016 Belmont Stakes winners Tonalist and Creator, and 2015 Belmont Stakes runner-up Frosted. Cupid's dam Pretty 'n Smart was a stakes-placed sprinter who had already produced three stakes winners prior to Cupid, all at sprint distances. The family traces to the Hall of Fame racemare Gallorette.

Cupid was purchased for $900,000 at the 2014 Keeneland Yearling Sales by a Coolmore Stud partnership consisting of Michael Tabor, Susan Magnier and Derrick Smith.

He was trained by Bob Baffert, whose earlier notable horses included American Triple Crown winner American Pharoah. Baffert admitted to being somewhat depressed by American Pharoah's retirement after the 2015 Breeders' Cup Classic. "It's like watching your child leave. You think, 'Is he going to be OK? Is he sleeping at night?'... It was tough when he left, but we're always looking at those young 2-year-olds coming up... We always have our minds thinking about the future."

== Racing career ==
Cupid raced only once at age two, finishing fourth in a maiden special weight race at Los Alamitos Race Course on December 20, 2015.

Cupid finished second in his next start at Santa Anita Park on January 9, 2016, when he was officially age three. (Note: All Thoroughbred's foaled in North America have an official birth date of January 1. Cupid was foaled on May 19, 2013, making him a few months younger than most of his rivals who were foaled earlier in the year.) On February 7, he entered another maiden race at Santa Anita at a distance of 1 1/16 miles. Despite stumbling at the start, he won by 5 1/2 lengths and earned an Equibase Speed Figure of 100. Baffert originally planned to enter the colt in the San Felipe Stakes at Santa Anita but decided to scratch from that race and enter him in the Rebel Stakes at Oaklawn Park on March 19 instead. Baffert had won five of the last six editions of the Rebel, most notably with American Pharoah to start off his Triple Crown campaign in 2015. The Rebel was considered one of the strongest early preps for the Kentucky Derby, including Suddenbreakingnews, Whitmore, Creator and Cherry Wine. Cupid won in front-running fashion in a solid time of 1:43.84 for 1 1/16 miles, improving his Equibase Speed Figure to 106. Jockey Martin Garcia noted, "It's hard for horses to break their maiden and then step up to this kind of company with this many people around and win, but he did."

The win made Cupid one of the leading contenders on the 2016 Road to the Kentucky Derby. Veteran sportswriter Steve Haskin noted the colt's rapid step up in class and felt he had room for further improvement, especially as he was a late foal. Cupid was the 4-5 favorite in the $1 million Arkansas Derby on April 16 but faded to tenth after tracking the early pace. Baffert later discovered that Cupid had suffered an entrapped epiglottis during the race, which obstructed the colt's breathing. Cupid underwent corrective surgery at Rood and Riddle Equine Hospital.

After some time off for recovery, Cupid returned on June 11 in the Easy Goer Stakes at Belmont Park. After breaking poorly, Cupid rushed to the lead but then tired and finished last.

He made his next start on July 17 in the $500,000 Indiana Derby. Once again he broke poorly, then moved up to challenge for the lead. In the stretch, the other early leaders dropped back but Cupid hung on for the win despite racing erratically down the stretch. "It was an exciting race," said Jimmy Barnes, Baffert's assistant trainer. "He was all over the place. (Jockey Rafael Bejarano) had to get him to run early and use him, but once he got into cruising gear, he looked good. Late down the lane, I don't know what it was. He was still on his left lead and leaning in – he was all over the place. But anyway, we got it done."

Cupid then entered the West Virginia Derby on August 6. This time he broke well and established an early lead, opening up a four-length lead on the final turn. Despite drifting out to the center of the track during the stretch, he won comfortably in a time of 1:50.54 for 1 1/8 miles. He returned on September 24 in a hotly contested renewal of the Pennsylvania Derby, featuring Kentucky Derby winner Nyquist and Preakness Stakes winner Exaggerator. Cupid went to the early lead with Awesome Slew but then faded in the stretch and finished eighth.

Baffert then gave the colt some time off, originally intending to return him in the Californian Stakes on April 22, 2017. However, Cupid cut himself an hour before the race and had to be scratched. He finally made his return in the Gold Cup at Santa Anita on May 27 after a 35-week layoff. It was also the colt's first time racing at a distance of 1 1/4 miles, but Baffert had not been concerned. "I learned a lot from (Hall of Fame trainer Charlie Whittingham) about bringing them off a layoff," he said. "If they're good enough, they can take it." Cupid rated in fourth behind the early leaders, then swept to the lead in the stretch to win by 3 1/4 lengths. "We took the back roads with Cupid last year and made over a million dollars," said Baffert. "Coolmore has been great and they kept him in training. They asked me if I thought he'd get better and I thought he should. We freshened him up and here we are."

After the Gold Cup, Cupid became ill and was not ready to race again until August 23 in the Harry F. Brubaker Stakes at Del Mar. Baffert was looking for an easy race to prepare the colt for the Awesome Again Stakes and Breeders' Cup later in the year. Instead, Cupid was almost caught at the finish line by Curlin Rules, who had been easily passed by Cupid turning into the stretch but then made a late rally to close the gap to three-quarters of a length. "It looked like he barely won, but we were hoping we would win and not get a really hard, hard race," said Baffert. "He came back pretty well, so this will set him up."

On September 30, Cupid went off as the 6-5 favorite in the Awesome Again Stakes. He was keen to run early and was carried four wide into the first turn. He pressed the pace down the backstretch then again went wide on the final turn as he moved to the lead. From behind him, Mubtaahij also started to move and gradually pulled away to win by 1 1/2 lengths. Cupid flattened in the stretch and finished fourth.

Because Baffert already had four horses in the Breeders' Cup Classic, he elected to enter Cupid in the Breeders' Cup Dirt Mile instead. Cupid was jostled at the start and settled in mid-pack down the backstretch. He tried to close ground around the final turn but tired and finished last.

== Retirement ==
Cupid was retired following the Classic to stand at Ashford Stud, the North American division of Coolmore. His stud fee for 2018 was set at $12,500.

Carson's Run was Cupid's first grade 1 winner, who stood the 2023 season for $5,000 at Ashford Stud. Cupid has one other graded stakes winner this season, Grade 3 West Virginia Governor's Stakes winner Duke of Love.

=== Notable progeny ===
c = colt, f = filly, g = gelding

Foaled	Name	Sex	Major Wins
2019	Carson's Run	c	Summer Stakes

== Pedigree ==
Pedigree of Cupid (USA), gray colt, 2013
Sire Tapit (USA) 2001	Pulpit; 1994	A.P. Indy	Seattle Slew
Sire Tapit (USA) 2001	Pulpit; 1994	A.P. Indy	Weekend Surprise
Sire Tapit (USA) 2001	Pulpit; 1994	Preach	Mr. Prospector
Sire Tapit (USA) 2001	Pulpit; 1994	Preach	Narrate
Sire Tapit (USA) 2001	Tap Your Heels; 1996	Unbridled	Fappiano
Sire Tapit (USA) 2001	Tap Your Heels; 1996	Unbridled	Gana Facil
Sire Tapit (USA) 2001	Tap Your Heels; 1996	Ruby Slippers	Nijinsky (CAN)
Sire Tapit (USA) 2001	Tap Your Heels; 1996	Ruby Slippers	Moon Glitter
Dam Pretty 'n Smart 1998	Beau Genius; 1985	Bold Ruckus	Boldnesian
Dam Pretty 'n Smart 1998	Beau Genius; 1985	Bold Ruckus	Raise a Ruckus
Dam Pretty 'n Smart 1998	Beau Genius; 1985	Royal Colleen	Viceregal
Dam Pretty 'n Smart 1998	Beau Genius; 1985	Royal Colleen	Own Colleen
Dam Pretty 'n Smart 1998	Charge d'Affaires; 1992	Vice Regent	Northern Dancer
Dam Pretty 'n Smart 1998	Charge d'Affaires; 1992	Vice Regent	Victoria Regina
Dam Pretty 'n Smart 1998	Charge d'Affaires; 1992	Office Affair	Secretariat
Dam Pretty 'n Smart 1998	Charge d'Affaires; 1992	Office Affair	Mlle. Liebe (Family: 17-b)

Cupid is inbred 4 × 5 to Mr. Prospector, meaning Mr. Prospector appears once in the fourth generation of Cupid's pedigree and once in the fifth generation. Cupid is also inbred 5 × 4 to Secretariat, 5 × 5 to Raise a Native, 5 × 4 × 5 to Northern Dancer, 4 × 5 to Victoria Regina and 5 × 5 to Bold Ruler.
