= The Majestic Star Casino, LLC =

American gambling holding company

- Type: Private
- Industry: Gambling
- Founded: December 8, 1993; Gary, Indiana
- Defunct: April 2021
- Headquarters: Las Vegas, Nevada
- Key people: Don H. Barden, Founder
- Owner: Wayzata Investment Partners and others

The Majestic Star Casino, LLC was a gaming holding company founded in Gary, Indiana by Don H. Barden and was based in Las Vegas, Nevada.

== History ==
The company was formed on December 8, 1993.

It opened the Majestic Star Casino in Gary, Indiana on June 7, 1996.

In December 2001, Majestic Star made its first expansion beyond Gary, acquiring three Fitzgeralds casinos from bankrupt Fitzgeralds Gaming for $149 million, in Las Vegas, Nevada, Black Hawk, Colorado, and Tunica, Mississippi. Chief operating officer Michael Kelly, a former Fitzgeralds executive, engineered the deal.

In April 2005, Majestic Star was selected to operate the casino at the French Lick Resort in French Lick, Indiana, being developed by a partnership of Lauth Property Group and the Cook Group. However, the Cook-Lauth partnership eventually decided to form its own casino management team, and Majestic's involvement ended amiably in September of that year.

In December 2005, Majestic Star acquired the neighboring Trump Casino in Gary from Trump Entertainment Resorts for $253 million, and renamed it as the Majestic Star II.

After Barden led an effort to legalize gambling in Pennsylvania, Majestic Star was awarded the only gaming license for Pittsburgh, beating out competing bids from Harrah's and Isle of Capri. Construction began in December 2007 on the $450 million riverfront Majestic Star Casino, which was projected to double the company's yearly revenues to over $1 billion. However, after defaulting on a $200 million bridge loan and failing to pay contractors, Majestic had to hand control in August 2008 to a group led by JMB Realty chairman Neil Bluhm, lead investor in the SugarHouse Casino in Philadelphia, who bought 75% of the project, and renamed it the Rivers Casino. Barden kept his remaining stake in the project outside of the Majestic Star umbrella.

In November 2009, Majestic Star filed for bankruptcy, listing $406 million in assets against $750 million in liabilities. The company cited the recession, increased competition from nearby properties, and a new smoking ban as reasons. In December 2010, Majestic sued Barden, claiming that he changed the company's tax status without notice, costing over $2 million in additional tax liabilities. The company's reorganization plan, filed the following month, would end Barden's ownership interest, while leaving other executives in place. The company left bankruptcy in 2011 under the majority ownership of Wayzata Investment Partners.

In October 2011, several months after Barden's death, his estate sold Fitzgeralds Las Vegas to brothers Derek and Greg Stevens, majority owners of the Golden Gate casino.

In May 2012, Majestic Star agreed to sell Fitzgeralds Black Hawk for $28 million to Saratoga Harness Racing, owner of Saratoga Casino and Raceway in New York. The sale closed in January 2013.

Majestic Star sold Fitzgeralds Tunica to Foundation Gaming in August 2018.

In November 2018, the company agreed to be acquired by Spectacle Entertainment, a new firm owned primarily by two Indiana-based investors. The buyers said they would lobby for permission to move the Majestic Star Casino inland within Gary, and to move the Majestic Star II's casino license to another city in Indiana.

== Properties ==
- Majestic Star Casino − Gary, Indiana
- Majestic Star II − Gary, Indiana

=== Former ===
- Fitzgeralds Black Hawk — Black Hawk, Colorado
- Fitzgeralds Las Vegas — Las Vegas, Nevada
- Fitzgeralds Tunica − Tunica Resorts, Mississippi

== Sources ==
- Corporate profile
- Las Vegas Review-Journal
