= Power Broker (horse) =

American thoroughbred racehorse

- Sire: Pulpit
- Grandsire: A.P. Indy
- Dam: Shop Again
- Damsire: Wild Again (USA)
- Sex: Stallion
- Foaled: February 15, 2010
- Country: USA
- Color: Chestnut Horse
- Breeder: Jamm. Ltd
- Owner: Gary and Mary West
- Trainer: Bob Baffert
- Record: 10:4-2-1
- Earnings: $865,612

Major wins
- Frontrunner Stakes (2012); Indiana Derby (2013)

Power Broker (foaled February 15, 2010) is an American Thoroughbred racehorse who won the 2012 Frontrunner Stakes.

== Career ==
His first race was at Delmar on July 28, 2012, where he came in first.

On September 29, 2012, he won the Grade 1 Frontrunner Stakes, which was the biggest win of his career.

On October 5, 2013, in his final race, he won the Grade 2 Indiana Derby. He was retired on November 19, 2013.

== Pedigree ==
Pedigree of Power Broker (USA), 2010
Sire Pulpit (USA) b. 1994	A.P. Indy (USA) b. 1989	Seattle Slew	Bold Reasoning
Sire Pulpit (USA) b. 1994	A.P. Indy (USA) b. 1989	Seattle Slew	My Charmer
Sire Pulpit (USA) b. 1994	A.P. Indy (USA) b. 1989	Weekend Surprise	Secretariat
Sire Pulpit (USA) b. 1994	A.P. Indy (USA) b. 1989	Weekend Surprise	Lassie Dear
Sire Pulpit (USA) b. 1994	Preach (USA) b. 1989	Mr Prospector	Raise a Native
Sire Pulpit (USA) b. 1994	Preach (USA) b. 1989	Mr Prospector	Gold Digger
Sire Pulpit (USA) b. 1994	Preach (USA) b. 1989	Narrate	Honest Pleasure
Sire Pulpit (USA) b. 1994	Preach (USA) b. 1989	Narrate	State
Dam Shop Again (USA) b. 2002	Wild Again (USA) b. 1980	Icecapade	Nearctic
Dam Shop Again (USA) b. 2002	Wild Again (USA) b. 1980	Icecapade	Shenanigans
Dam Shop Again (USA) b. 2002	Wild Again (USA) b. 1980	Bushel-n-Peck	Khaled
Dam Shop Again (USA) b. 2002	Wild Again (USA) b. 1980	Bushel-n-Peck	Dama
Dam Shop Again (USA) b. 2002	Shopping (USA) b. 1988	Private Account	Damascus
Dam Shop Again (USA) b. 2002	Shopping (USA) b. 1988	Private Account	Numbered Account
Dam Shop Again (USA) b. 2002	Shopping (USA) b. 1988	Impish	Majestic Prince
Dam Shop Again (USA) b. 2002	Shopping (USA) b. 1988	Impish	Lady Be Good
