= Hoosier Park =

Racino in Anderson, Indiana

Coordinates: 40°04′20″N 85°38′20″W

Harrah's Hoosier Park Racing & Casino
- Interactive map of Harrah's Hoosier Park Racing & Casino
- Location: Anderson, Indiana; 4500 Dan Patch Circle
- Opened: June 2008
- Gaming space: 92,000 sq ft (8,500 m^{2})
- Casino type: Racino
- Owner: Caesars Entertainment
- Website: hoosierpark.com

Harrah's Hoosier Park Racing & Casino is a racino including a standardbred racetrack located in Anderson, Indiana, approximately 30 miles northeast of Indianapolis. It is owned and operated by Caesars Entertainment. The facility features live harness racing from April through November, casino gaming, restaurants, a gift shop, and entertainment.

The $300,000 Dan Patch Stakes was established at Hoosier Park in 1994 and has become a tradition that highlights some of the best athletes in the sport of harness racing. The 2017 Breeders Crown, harness racing's annual series of 12 championship events valued at $6 million, was contested at Hoosier Park on October 27 & 28. The 2020 edition of the Breeders Crown occurred Oct. 30 & 31, while the 2023 edition was held at Harrah's Hoosier Park once again.

Hoosier Park offers off-track betting (OTB) at three locations in Indiana: Clarksville, Indianapolis, and New Haven. Hoosier Park also offers simulcast wagering year-round.

Hoosier Park has hosted musicians such as The B-52's, The Go-Go's, Willie Nelson, REO Speedwagon, and The Beach Boys.

Starting in 2027 Hoosier Park will host the Hambletonian Stakes, one of the races in the Triple Crown of Harness Racing for Trotters.

== History ==
In 1990, Virgil E. Cook, a prominent local businessman and longtime resident of Anderson, Indiana, donated 110 acres (0.45 km^{2}) of commercial real estate to the city for the sole purpose of developing a pari-mutuel racing facility. In 1992, Churchill Downs Incorporated announced plans to purchase Indiana's only pari-mutuel license from The Anderson Park Group headed by Louis Carlo and open a racetrack on the site of the land donated by Cook. It was the first racetrack outside Kentucky owned by Churchill Downs since 1939. In February 1994 a contract was signed for the construction of Hoosier Park. The construction of the facility cost approximately $13 million. On September 1, 1994, the track finally opened. A crowd of 7,633 came to the grand opening of the standardbred season. The track announces plans to open four off-track betting facilities in Indiana. On October 7, 1995, the first Indiana Derby was run.

Churchill Downs sold Hoosier Park in April 2007 for $8.2 million to Centaur Group.

Legislation was passed shortly after April 2007 to permit slot machines at both tracks, converting them to racinos. Both tracks were legislated to get a 55 percent share of the estimated $325 million the 2,000 slots at each of the state's two tracks were expected to generate annually. This would also increase the purse sizes of the races.

Hoosier Park Casino opened to the public on June 2, 2008.

In 2001, Indiana Downs became the second horse racing track in the state. Initially located in Fairland, Indiana; it was later annexed into nearby Shelbyville, Indiana.

The Indiana Derby was once held at Hoosier Park but is now held at Indiana Grand Racing & Casino.

In 2018, Caesars Entertainment bought Hoosier Park from Centaur Holdings, along with Indiana Grand. The company has rebranded the property as Harrah's Hoosier Park.

== Physical attributes ==
The track is a seven-eighths of a mile dirt oval. There is no turf course.

== Racing ==
Stakes races at Hoosier Park include:

- The Dan Patch Stakes
- The Nadia Lobell
- Kentuckiana Stallion Management
- Centaur Trotting Classic
- The Hoosier Park Pacing Derby
- The Elevation
- The Jenna's Beachboy
- The Moni Maker
- The Circle City
- The Madison County
- The Pegasus
- The Monument Circle
- The Carl Erskine
- The USS Indianapolis Mem.
- The Crossroads of America

== See also ==
- List of casinos in Indiana
