= Yahtzee (game show) =

- Genre: Game show
- Presented by: Peter Marshall
- Announcer: Larry Hovis
- Country of origin: United States

Production
- Executive producers: Ralph Andrews; Gary Bernstein; Larry Hovis
- Producers: Lou Valenzi; Ernesto Romero
- Production locations: Trump's Castle, Atlantic City (earlier episodes); Showboat Hotel & Casino, Atlantic City (later episodes)
- Running time: approx. 22 minutes
- Production companies: Ralph Andrews Productions; Bernstein-Hovis Productions

Original release
- Network: Syndicated (daily)
- Release: January 11, 1988 – September 1988

Yahtzee is an American game show that premiered on January 11, 1988. Based on the dice game Yahtzee, the show was hosted by Peter Marshall, with Larry Hovis serving as both the show's announcer and a regular panelist. Each week featured a different hostess serving as "dice girl", including Kelly Grant, Denise DiRenzo, and Teresa Ganzel.

Yahtzee was originally taped at Trump's Castle in Atlantic City, New Jersey, though later it moved to Showboat Hotel & Casino.

== Gameplay ==
Two teams of three contestants played against each other along with a panel of five celebrities.

The team in control—starting with the challengers—chose one of six open-ended questions (e.g., "Name something you put on rice." or "What's your biggest gripe when you go shopping?"). Marshall asked the chosen question to the panel, who then wrote down their responses. Each contestant, starting with the team captain, gave a verbal answer in an attempt to match the stars' answers. The other team played one of the remaining five questions. The team with the most matches won the round. If the teams had the same number of matches, a tie-breaker involving only the team captains was played. The celebrities read the question to themselves and then wrote down an answer. Marshall read the question aloud to the team captains, and the first contestant to buzz-in and provide an answer that matched one of the celebrities' answers won control of the round.

Winning a round gave the team captain a chance to roll five dice, as in regular Yahtzee. However, each die featured one face reading "Wild" in place of a number. The team rolled the dice and chose dice in order to build a combination of five of the same number.

Rounds two and three were played in similar fashion to round one, with each team responding to one question in each round. However, the winner of round two rolled all five dice (as opposed to using only the remaining dice as in the traditional game), attempting to build on any previous combination from the earlier round. The winners of round three chose to either roll their dice or pass the dice to their opponents. The team that eventually rolled the dice in round three received two rolls.

The first team to make a Yahtzee, or the team closest to a Yahtzee at the end of three rounds won the game. If the game ended a tie (e.g., if one team had four 6's and the other had four 5's), a sudden death question was played, with the same rules as the tie-breaker in the question rounds. The first team to match at least one celebrity won the game.

== Bonus Round ==
The winning team chose a letter in the word "Yahtzee" to determine the payout for winning the bonus round. Four letters hid $5,000, two letters hid $10,000, and one letter hid $25,000.

Marshall read one final question to the celebrity panel. As in the main game, each team member tried to match the celebrities' responses, and each match earned one roll of the dice, for a maximum of five rolls. However, the team was guaranteed at least one roll.

The team captain then rolled the dice and attempted to make a Yahtzee. If they were successful within the number of rolls earned, the team split the prize chosen at the beginning of the bonus round. Otherwise, the team received $500 for each number or wild that would have contributed toward a Yahtzee. Rolling a Yahtzee on the first roll won the team $100,000.

Later in the show's run, rolling a Yahtzee on the first roll was worth double the winning payout chosen at the beginning of the round. The team could only win the $100,000 prize if all five wilds were rolled on the first roll.

Any team that won three consecutive games also received a vacation for themselves and companions.

== Production End and Lawsuit ==
On February 2, 1988, executive producers Gary Bernstein and Larry Hovis were arrested as they were checking out of the Showboat over a dispute with co-executive producer Ralph Andrews over continued funding for Yahtzee, which had premiered less than a month prior and had not caught on with audiences at all. The move effectively cancelled the low-rated game show.

Just as they were about to leave, Atlantic City police placed Hovis and Bernstein under arrest and detained them in the lobby of the casino on suspicion of theft. It had been alleged that the men had stolen several set pieces, including the giant dice, from the now-shuttered production. They were later interrogated for three hours by New Jersey state gaming officials.

On April 19, 1988, by which point the show had been dropped by most of the stations airing it, Bernstein and Hovis filed a defamation lawsuit in Atlantic County Superior Court, much to the bewilderment of Andrews, who accused the men of looking for "deep pockets". This lawsuit, which followed a second suit against various entities involved in producing Yahtzee and led to a precipitous drop in affiliates, was filed against several defendants including the city, the state of New Jersey, and distributor ABR Entertainment. Hovis in particular was displeased as many of the casino patrons who walked past him as he was detained recognized him due to his previous role on the TV comedy Hogan's Heroes.
