= Majestic Star II =

Former floating casino in Gary, Indiana

Coordinates: 41.640784°N 87.420582°W

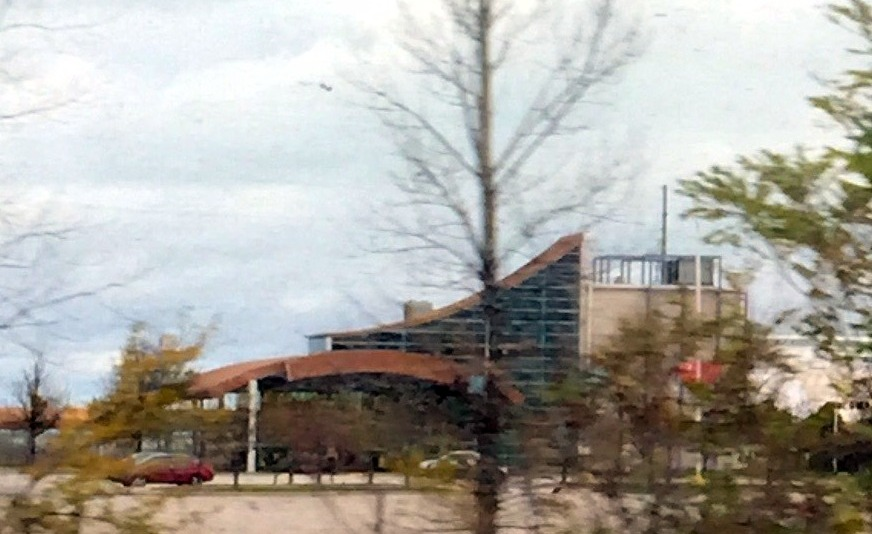
- Complex in 2016
- Interactive map of Majestic Star II
- Location: United States; 1 Buffington Harbor Drive, Gary, IN 46406-3000
- Opened: 1996
- Closed: April 2021
- Owner: The Majestic Star Casino, LLC
- Previous names: Trump

The Majestic Star II (formerly known as the Trump Casino) was a floating casino that operated from 1996 to 2021 in Gary, Indiana. Located in Gary's Buffington Harbor, it overlooked Lake Michigan.

The casino was opened in 1996 by New York–based Trump Hotels & Casino Resorts, which operated an adjoining Trump hotel.

In December 2005, the Trump Organization sold the casino and hotel to Majestic Star Holdings, which operated the Majestic Star Casino next door.

Majestic Star closed both casinos in April 2021. One license was transferred to the Hard Rock Casino Northern Indiana, located inland in Gary.

As of August 2025, Majestic Star II is docked in Sarnia Harbor, Sarnia, Ontario Canada. The Majestic Star vessel had been towed to Bay Shipbuilding Company in Sturgeon Bay.
