= Horseshoe Indianapolis =

Racino in Shelbyville, Indiana

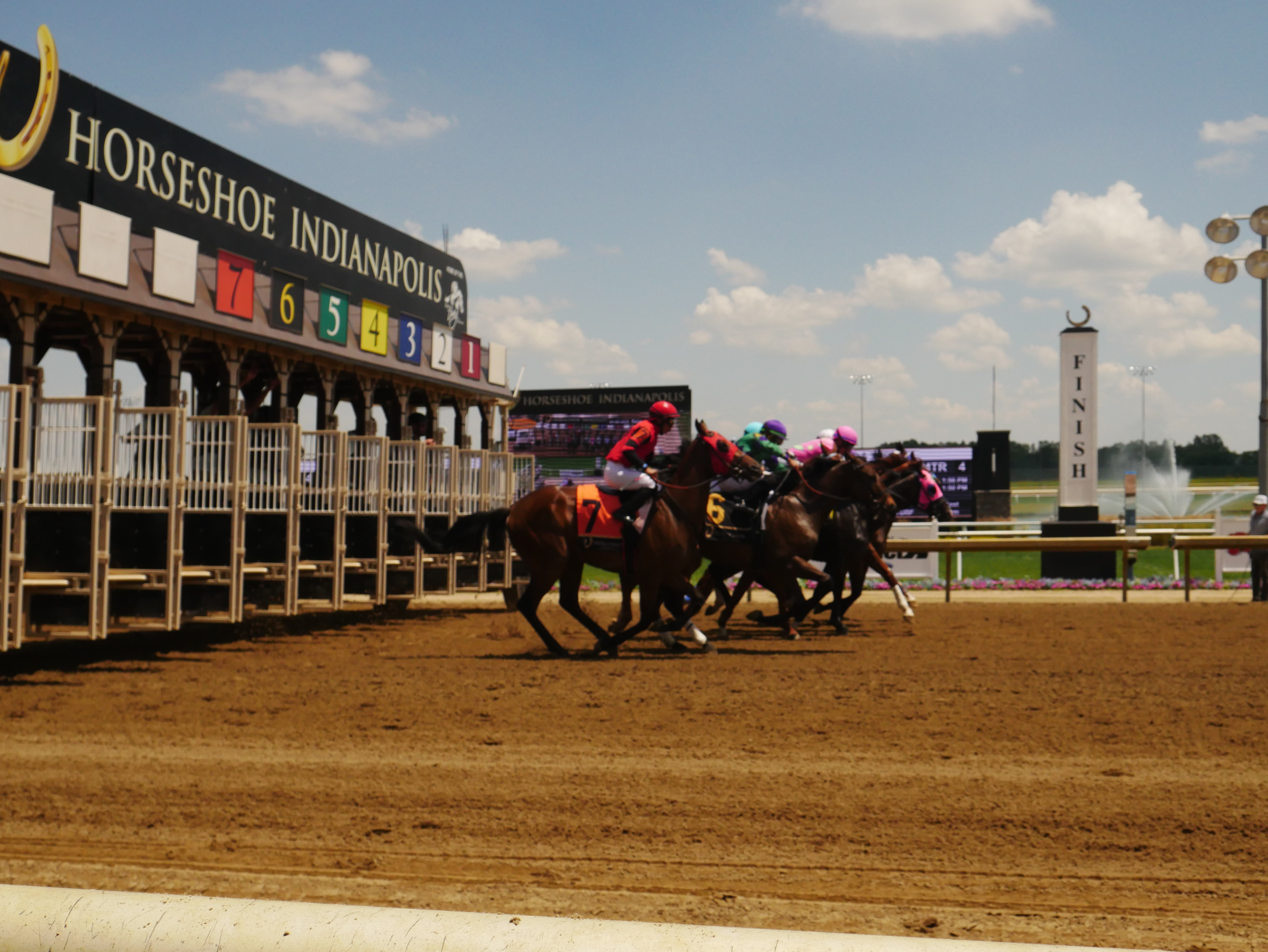
- Out of the starting gate, 2025
- Interactive map of Horseshoe Indianapolis
- Location: Shelbyville, Indiana; 4300 N. Michigan Road; 39.590°N 85.822°W
- Opened: March 13, 2009
- Gaming space: 233,000 square feet (21,600 m^{2})
- Casino type: Racino
- Owner: Caesars Entertainment
- Website: www.caesars.com/horseshoe-indianapolis

Horseshoe Indianapolis (formerly Indiana Grand Racing & Casino and Indiana Live!) is a casino with a horse racing track in Shelbyville, Indiana owned and operated by Caesars Entertainment. It is the closest casino to Indianapolis. It offers gaming, restaurants, a gift shop and entertainment. The 233,000-square-foot (21,600 m^{2}) facility has over 1,704 slot machines and live table games. It was built at a cost of more than $250 million. For Indiana fiscal year 2025, the casino generated gross gaming revenue of $332.2 million.

Horseshoe Indianapolis' casino has hosted musicians such as The Buckinghams, Grand Funk Railroad, Duke Tumatoe of REO Speedwagon, Peter Noone of Herman's Hermits, The Lovin' Spoonful, The Box Tops, Paul Revere & the Raiders, The Fabulous Thunderbirds, The Kentucky Headhunters, Fuel, Marc Cohn, All-4-One, Color Me Badd, Ginuwine, Ludacris, and comedian Mike Epps.

Logo of Indiana Grand Racing & Casino prior to its rebranding in January 2022

The racetrack was previously known as Indiana Downs. The casino opened on March 13, 2009, as Indiana Live! Casino. It filed for Chapter 11 bankruptcy in 2011 and was renamed Indiana Grand Casino in June 2012, and rebranded as Indiana Grand Racing & Casino in February 2013. Centaur Gaming purchased the casino in February 2013. Caesars Entertainment acquired it in 2018. The Indiana Grand racetrack and casino complex were rebranded to Horseshoe Indianapolis in late January 2022, in line with other properties owned by Caesars.

Horseshoe Indianapolis offers live Thoroughbred and Quarter Horse racing from April through October. The track is affiliated with three OTB parlors around Indiana, in Clarksville, Indianapolis, and New Haven.

Horseshoe Indianapolis is the home of the Indiana Derby.

== Labor relations ==
In October 2025, more than 200 dealers and dual rates (workers who divide their time between dealing and supervising) went on strike at Horseshoe Indianapolis, seeking union recognition with the International Brotherhood of Teamsters Local 135. In December 2025, the two-month strike came to an end after the dealers and dual rates successfully unionized with the Teamsters Local 135, which already represented slot attendants at Horseshoe Indianapolis.

== Races ==
=== Graded events ===
Grade III

- Indiana Derby
- Indiana Oaks

=== Stakes events ===
Thoroughbred stakes races include:

- Sagamore Sired Stakes
- ITOBA Stallion Season Fillies Stakes
- Hoosier Breeders Sophomore
- Hoosier Breeders Sophomore Fillies
- Mari Hulman George Stakes
- Michael G Schaefer Memorial Mile
- Indiana General Assembly Distaff
- Warrior Veterans
- Governor's
- Indiana First Lady
- William Henry Harrison Stakes
- Shelby County Stakes
- Centaur
- Indiana Grand
- A. J. Foyt Stakes
- Florence Henderson Stakes
- Crown Ambassador
- Indiana Stallion Fillies
- Indiana Futurity
- Miss Indiana

Quarter Horse stakes races include:

- Born Runner Classic
- Harley Greene Derby Final
- Gordon Mobley Futurity Final
- Jaguar Rocket QH Stakes Final
- Blue River Derby Stakes Final
- Bob Woodward Memorial Classic Final
- QHRAI Stallion Service Auction Futurity Final
- Sterlie Bertram Memorial Stakes Final
- Miss Roxie Little Final
- Indiana Championship
- Governors Stake Final
- QHRAI Derby Final

== See also ==
- List of casinos in Indiana
