= Trump Entertainment Resorts =

Defunct gaming and hospitality company

Trump Entertainment Resorts, Inc.
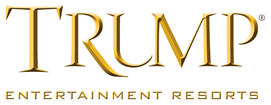
- Type: Subsidiary
- Traded as: NYSE: DJT; Nasdaq: TRMP; OTC Pink: TRMPQ
- Industry: Gambling; Entertainment; Hospitality
- Founded: 1995; 31 years ago
- Founder: Donald Trump
- Defunct: 2016
- Fate: Bankrupt, assets acquired, resold by Icahn Enterprises
- Key people: Carl Icahn (stakeholder management)
- Products: Trump One Card
- Revenue: $175.6 million (2016)

Trump Entertainment Resorts, Inc. was an American gambling and hospitality company. The company previously owned and operated the now-demolished Trump Plaza and Trump World's Fair (both in Atlantic City), the sold and renamed Trump Marina in Atlantic City, Trump Casino & Hotel in Gary, Indiana, Trump 29 in Coachella, California, and Trump Taj Mahal in Atlantic City. It was founded in 1995 as Trump Hotels & Casino Resorts by Donald Trump, who after 2004 held only a minority ownership. The company filed for bankruptcy in 2004, 2009 and 2014. It became a subsidiary of Icahn Enterprises in 2016. Since then, all of the company's properties have been closed and sold.

== History ==
=== The beginning ===
Donald Trump began purchasing properties along the Atlantic City boardwalk in the early 1980s and received a casino license from the New Jersey Casino Control Commission (CCC) on March 15, 1982. He had planned to build his own casino on the boardwalk, but was stalled on the project when Mike Rose, then CEO of Holiday Inn and Harrah's approached him to manage construction of a Holiday Inn Casino-Hotel. It opened in May 1984 and two years later Trump bought out Holiday Inn's shares in the property and renamed it the Trump Plaza Hotel and Casino.

In 1985, Trump purchased the nearly-complete Atlantic City Hilton hotel and casino property at the Atlantic marina from Hilton Hotels for $325 million. The hotel chain sold the property after its application for a gambling license was turned down by the CCC. Trump originally opened the property as Trump's Castle Hotel Casino, and later renamed it the Trump Marina.

In 1988, Trump purchased the unfinished Taj Mahal property from Resorts International for $230 million after negotiations with Merv Griffin in which the two men divided the assets of the failing company. The casino, at the time the largest in Atlantic City, would eventually cost almost $1 billion by the time it opened in 1990. Trump completed the project using junk bonds, a decision that hurt the company afterward as the gambling industry struggled in a recession and interest rates became unmanageable.

The company was shaken by the deaths of three key executives in an October 10, 1989 helicopter crash in northern New Jersey while they were returning from a New York press conference promoting an upcoming Atlantic City boxing event. The men were Stephen F. Hyde, the CEO of Trump's casino operations, Mark Grossinger Etess, the president and chief operating officer of the Taj Mahal, and Trump Plaza executive vice president Jonathan Benanav.

In 1995, Trump established Trump Hotels and Casino Resorts (THCR) as a publicly traded company, granting it ownership of the Trump Plaza and the under-development Trump Casino in Gary, Indiana. The company traded under the symbol DJT. The following year, THCR bought the Trump Taj Mahal at a valuation of $890 million, and bought the Trump Castle from Trump for $486 million (including $355 million in assumed debt).

In 1996, the company opened Trump World's Fair, a casino adjunct to the Trump Plaza. The World's Fair was closed in 1999, with plans to replace it with a larger resort.

In 1997, THCR was one of eleven applicants for three casino licenses available in Detroit, with a $542-million proposal for the Trump Motor City Hotel Casino, in partnership with Mel Farr. The bid was ultimately dropped from consideration because of Mayor Dennis Archer's doubts about the company's financial condition.

In 1998, THCR business consultants spent at least $68,000 on a trip to Cuba in violation to the United States embargo against Cuba. According to a report by Newsweek, the consulting firm Seven Arrows Investment and Development instructed THCR on how to evade the embargo by linking the money to a charitable effort.

In 1999, THCR agreed to purchase the Flamingo Hilton Casino Kansas City for $15 million, but the deal fell through when Missouri gambling regulators did not approve the company's gambling license by a contractual deadline.

THCR entered a management agreement in 2000 to operate the Spotlight 29 Casino, an Indian casino in Coachella, California.

=== Financial troubles ===
Trump Entertainment Resorts and its predecessors have filed for Chapter 11 bankruptcy protection four times, in 1991, following construction of the $1-billion Trump Taj Mahal, and in 2004, 2009 and 2014.

In 2004, Trump Hotels & Casino Resorts explored various options for restructuring its debt, amid speculation that it might file for bankruptcy. A possible arrangement with Credit Suisse First Boston was not completed because the bondholders rejected it.

On October 21, 2004, the company announced a preliminary agreement with its investors. Trump, who had been the majority owner, would reduce his stock ownership from 56 to 27 percent. Bondholders would surrender some of their debt in exchange for stock. On October 27, the company announced that Morgan Stanley would be the joint lead arranger for a $500 million financing as part of the restructuring plan. On November 21, the company filed for bankruptcy. Trump said the filing was "really just a technical thing" as the best way to implement the restructuring plan. The plan was submitted to the bankruptcy court on December 16, 2004.

After the 2004 bankruptcy, Trump Hotels & Casino Resorts changed its name to Trump Entertainment Resorts (TER), and Trump ceased to play an active role in the company.

In 2005, the company's involvement in the Spotlight 29 Casino ended, as the tribe bought out the casino management agreement for $6 million. Later that year, TER sold its Indiana casino to The Majestic Star Casino, LLC for $253 million. The company had also been awarded a license to build a second casino in Orange County, Indiana, but dropped this plan, due in part to the state's concerns about the company's viability.

In 2007, the company attempted to negotiate a buyout with several public and private firms, but on July 2, it announced that it could not reach a deal, and would take itself off the market. The company planned to lay off employees in order to cut costs.

=== 2009 bankruptcy and restructuring ===
The casino group filed for bankruptcy again in February 2009, owing $1.2 billion. Two sets of debt holders eventually proposed reorganization plans for the group in U.S. bankruptcy court.

Trump initially made an agreement with banker and poker player Andrew Beal, owner of Beal Bank, which held $500 million in the group's debt, to take over the resorts. However, citing concerns about the bank's lack of gambling experience, he dropped them in favor of hedge fund Avenue Capital Management, a plan favored by other bondholders. Beal then partnered with investor, Carl Icahn, who had worked on restructuring another Atlantic City casino, the Tropicana. In court, Trump argued that he would fight the Icahn/Beal team if they sought to use his name and likeness on the group's properties. Instead he signed an agreement with Avenue Capital in which he would receive 5% stock in the reorganized company and another 5% in exchange for the use of his name and likeness in perpetuity.

The bankruptcy court eventually sided with the Trump/Avenue partnership, favored by bond holders who believed that Trump's brand would result in a stronger company after reorganization.

In 2011, TER sold the Trump Marina to Landry's Restaurants, which also operates the Golden Nugget in Las Vegas.

=== Post-2009 bankruptcy ===
In February 2013, the company agreed to sell the Trump Plaza for $20 million to the Meruelo Group, a California-based company whose holdings include the Grand Sierra Resort in Reno, Nevada. The proceeds would be used to pay down the company's debt to a level of $270 million. CEO Robert Griffin said TER would consider also selling the Trump Taj Mahal for the right price. However, Carl Icahn, who held the mortgage on the Trump casinos, would reject the sale of the Trump Plaza.

In early August 2014, Donald Trump filed a lawsuit demanding removal of his name from the company's two casinos, because they had allegedly been allowed to fall into disrepair, in breach of the licensing agreement for Trump's name.

=== 2014 bankruptcy ===
In September 2014, Trump Entertainment Resorts filed again for bankruptcy, and closed the Trump Plaza. On a motion made by union UNITE HERE Local 54, relating to the bankruptcy action, the United States Court of Appeals for the Third Circuit ruled in Trump Entertainment's favor on January 15, 2016, and held that Trump Entertainment could reject the continuing terms and conditions of a collective bargaining agreement with the union, an agreement that had already expired by its terms. This case was significant as it was a matter of First impression among the courts of appeal and could significantly alter the balance of power between debtor-employers and their unions.

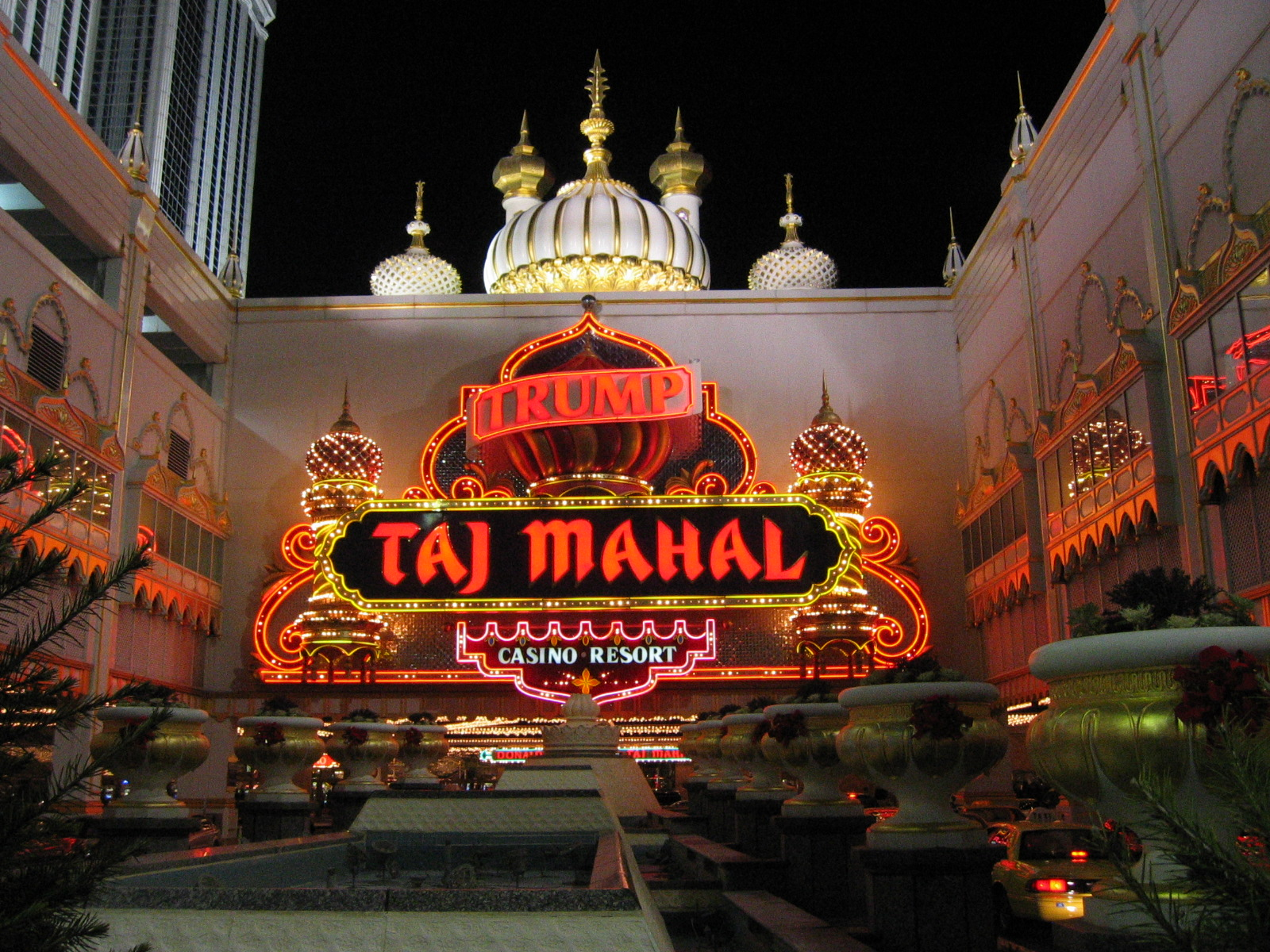
Entrance to the Trump Taj Mahal at night, Atlantic City, New Jersey

The company eventually exited bankruptcy in February 2016 and became a subsidiary of Icahn Enterprises.

== Folding of the company ==
On October 10, 2016, the Trump Taj Mahal, the company's last operating property, closed for the final time. Trump Entertainment continued to operate to deal with the transfer of some points on the Trump One card account. All of the websites related to the company were redirected to DonaldJTrump.com.

Trump Plaza remained vacant after the company had gone defunct and its assets were acquired by Icahn Enterprises. In November 2017, it was revealed that Icahn was looking to demolish the casino, and was seeking $5.6 million in tax funds to pay for the demolition, but this caused a rift between Icahn and the local government, delaying the project. On December 14, 2018, the deadline for demolishing it officially passed, meaning Trump Plaza would remain standing through the winter. Later that month, Icahn terminated the deed restriction on the property and bought out a complicated lease, making a sale more attractive.

The building was declared a hazard by the city in March 2020; demolition began that summer, and the main hotel tower was imploded on February 17, 2021. A charity auction benefited the Boys and Girls Club, with most of the money coming from Icahn after he objected to the original plan to auction off the right to press the demolition button.

== Former properties ==
The company's properties included:

- Harrah's at Trump Plaza in Atlantic City, New Jersey; formerly a 50/50 partnership with Harrah's, later wholly owned by the company and renamed the Trump Plaza. Closed on September 16, 2014; demolished February 17, 2021.
- Trump 29 Casino in Coachella, California; formerly a 50/50 partnership with the Twenty-Nine Palms Band of Mission Indians of California. In 2006 Trump officially exited the partnership.
- Trump Casino in Gary, Indiana, sold in 2005
- Trump World's Fair at Trump Plaza in Atlantic City, New Jersey. Operated as a wing of Trump Plaza, but with its own casino license, it was closed in 1999, and demolished in 2000.
- Trump Castle (renamed Trump Marina in 1997) in Atlantic City, New Jersey; sold to Landry's, Inc. in 2011 and renamed the Golden Nugget Atlantic City.
- Steel Pier, sold in 2011
- Trump Club Privee Casino – Canouan – Saint Vincent
- Trump Taj Mahal, a casino resort on the Atlantic City boardwalk; closed on October 10, 2016. Purchased by Hard Rock International and reopened as the Hard Rock Hotel & Casino Atlantic City in June 2018.
