= Don H. Barden =

American businessman

Don Hamilton Barden (December 20, 1943 – May 19, 2011) was an American casino executive. He was the first black casino owner in Las Vegas. His company, The Majestic Star Casino, LLC, filed for bankruptcy protection in 2009.

== Career ==
When one of Barden's companies acquired the Fitzgeralds Las Vegas casino, Barden became the first African-American casino owner in Vegas.

Barden was the manager, chairman, president and chief executive officer of The Majestic Star Casino, LLC, from its formation, with responsibility for key policy making functions. Since their inception, Barden had also served as president and chief executive officer of Majestic Investor Holdings, LLC, and manager of Barden Colorado Blackhawk, Colorado, Barden Mississippi Tunica, Mississippi, and Barden Nevada Las Vegas, Nevada; and chairman and president of BDI. Barden also served as chairman of Barden Gary Foundation, Inc., and Don H. Barden Foundation, Inc. since their formations.

Additionally, he was the president and chief executive officer of Barden Companies, Inc. and a group of other companies he owned and/or operated. Over the past 30 years, Barden had successfully developed, owned and operated many business enterprises in various industries including real estate development, casino gaming, broadcasting, cable television and international trade. In 2003, Black Enterprise Magazine selected Barden as Company of the Year. In 2004, Barden received the Trumpet Award for Entrepreneur of the Year.

In 2007, Barden was awarded the rights to build a casino in the North Shore area of Pittsburgh, adjacent to Heinz Field, home of the Pittsburgh Steelers. The selection was made over heavy objections of local taxpayers who preferred another competing offer from Isle of Capri Casinos. That offer would have built a new multi-purpose arena adjacent to a casino complex in the area now occupied by the Civic Arena. Isle of Capri agreed to foot the entire cost of the new complex, valued at the time at $290 million. Barden's selection by the Commonwealth of Pennsylvania Gaming Commission forced the city of Pittsburgh and the buildings principal tenant, the Pittsburgh Penguins, to come up with an alternate plan, using taxpayer money to fund the facility.

In 2008, Barden was unable to secure permanent financing that would have permitted work to continue on the North Shore Casino project. Work at the site was stopped for weeks, until another investor could be found. Only after Chicago billionaire Neil Bluhm of JMB Realty bought controlling interest in the project, did work continue. Barden retained a minority interest in the project.

For years the Barden gambling facility in Gary existed beside another gambling facility belonging to Donald Trump. Barden bought the second facility for a price reflecting historic revenue at a time when several other facilities were opening up in Illinois and Indiana. Majestic Star and Fitzgerald casinos in Indiana, Mississippi and Colorado filed for bankruptcy in November 2009. In December 2011, the facilities were turned over to creditors. The Nevada casino and Barden's ownership in the Pittsburgh, Pennsylvania casino were separately held and were not part of the bankruptcy.

== Death ==
On May 19, 2011, Barden died of lung cancer at The Barbara Ann Karmanos Cancer Institute in Detroit. He was 67. Earlier that year, his wife Bella had filed for legal separation, saying in court documents that her husband was so sick with cancer that he could not make his own business and financial decisions. He and his wife Bella are interred at Woodlawn Cemetery near the Michael Jackson commemorative cenotaph.

== Legacy ==
- Barden is featured on the documentary series Profiles of African-American Success.
