= Breeders Crown Open Trot =

- Class: Grade 1
- Location: North America
- Inaugurated: 1985
- Race type: Harness race for Standardbred pacers
- Website: hambletonian.com

Race information
- Distance: 1 mile (1,609 metres or 8 furlongs)
- Surface: Dirt
- Qualification: 4-year-olds-and-up
- Purse: $600,000 (2023)

The Breeders Crown Open Trot is a Grade 1 harness racing event for Standardbred trotters. It is one part of the Breeders Crown annual series of twelve races for both Standardbred trotters and pacers. The Open Trot for horses age four and older was first run in 1985. It is contested over a distance of one mile. Race organizers have awarded the event to various racetracks across North America.

== Historical race events ==
In 2023, Ake Svanstedt became the first trainer to win the race three times by winning his third straight.

Six trainers have won the race twice: Charles Sylvester (1988, 1994), Ron Waples, Jr. (1990, 1992), Jimmy Takter (1998, 2015), Jim Doherty (2002, 2003), Trond Smedshammer (2004, 2006), Linda Toscano (2012, 2013).

== North American locations ==
- Meadowlands Racetrack (Mxx) New Jersey (15)
- Mohawk Raceway (Moh) Ontario (8)
- Woodbine Racetrack (Wdb) Ontario (4)
- Harrah's Hoosier Park (HoP) Indiana (3)
- Pocono Downs (Pcd) Pennsylvania (3)
- Freehold Raceway (Fhl) New Jersey (1)
- The Meadows Racetrack (Mea) Pennsylvania (1)
- Pompano Park (Ppk) Florida (1)
- Freestate Raceway (Fsr) Maryland (1)
- Delaware County Fairgrounds racetrack (Dela) Ohio (1)
- Louisville Downs (Lou) Kentucky (1)
- Sportsmans Park (Spt) Illinois (1)
- Saratoga Raceway (Stg) New York (1)

== Records ==
Most wins by a horse

- 2 – No Sex Please (1990, 1992), Fool's Goal (2002, 2003), Ecurie D (2021, 2022)

Most wins by a driver

- 6 – John Campbell (1985, 1988, 1989, 1994, 1997, 2008)

Most wins by a trainer

- 3 – Ake Svanstedt (2021, 2022, 2023)

Stakes record

- 1:51 0/0 – Market Share (2013), Commander Crowe (2014), Ecurie D Dk (2022), Winner's Bet (2024)

== Winners of the Breeders Crown Open Trot ==
Year	Winner	Age	Driver	Trainer	Owner	Time	Purse	Track
2025	French Wine	5	Jason Bartlett	Nancy Takter	Daniel and Jean-Christophe Plouffe, One Legend Stable	1:50 1/5	$600,000	Moh
2024	Winner's Bet	4	Dexter Dunn	Nancy Takter	Lindy Farms of Connecticut, Robert Rudolph	1:51 0/0	$600,000	Mxx
2023	Southwind Tyrion	5	Ake Svanstedt	Ake Svanstedt	S R F Stable, Ake Svanstedt, Knutsson Trotting, Brittany Farms & Riverview Racing	1:52 2/5	$600,000	HoP
2022	Ecurie D	5	Dexter Dunn	Ake Svanstedt	Marko Kreivi Stable, Suleyman Yuksel Stable, Ake Svanstedt	1:51 0/0	$600,000	Moh
2021	Ecurie D	5	Ake Svanstedt	Ake Svanstedt	Marko Kreivi Stable, Suleyman Yuksel Stable, Ake Svanstedt	1:52 0/0	$650,000	Mxx
2020	Gimpanzee	4	Brian Sears	Marcus Melander	Courant Inc., SRF Stable	1:51 3/5	$500,000	HoP
2019	Bold Eagle	8	Brian Sears	Sebastien Gurato	Ecurie Pierre Pilarski	1:52 0/0	$500,000	Moh
2018	Homicide Hunter	6	George Napolitano	Chris Oakes	Crawford Farms Racing	1:52 3/5	$550,000	Pcd
2017	Hannelore Hanover	6	Yannick Gingras	Ron Burke	Burke Racing Stable, Weaver Bruscemi, Frank Baldachino, J&T Silva Stables	1:52 1/5	$526,250	HoP
2016	Flanagan Memory	6	Brian Sears	Rene Dion	Liette Flanagan & Rene Dion	1:52 1/5	$500,000	Mxx
2015	Creatine	5	Johnny Takter	Jimmy Takter	Big C Racing	1:52 4/5	$531,250	Wdb
2014	Commander Crowe	11	Orjan Kihlstrom	Fabrice Souloy	Snogarps Gard	1:51 0/0	$500,000	Mxx
2013	Market Share	4	Tim Tetrick	Linda Toscano	Richard Gutnick, TLP Stable & Bill Augustine	1:51 0/0	$600,000	Pcd
2012	Chapter Seven	4	Tim Tetrick	Linda Toscano	Richard Gutnick, Southwind Farms, Silva Stables LLC	1:52 3/5	$600,000	Wdb
2011	San Pail	7	Randy Waples	Rod Hughes	Glenn Van Camp & Rod Hughes	1:51 4/5	$600,000	Wdb
2010	Enough Talk	7	Ronald Pierce	Peter Kleinhans	Peter Kleinhans Racing & Jerry SIlva	1:52 0/0	$600,000	Pcd
2009	Lucky Jim	4	Andy Miller	Julie Miller	David & John Prushnok, & William Gregg	1:52 1/5	$600,000	Mxx
2008	Corleone Kosmos	6	John Campbell	Darren McCall	A. Rudolph, B. Owen & Rudolph Stbs	1:51 4/5	$645,000	Moh
2007	Equinox Bi	6	Trevor Ritchie	Jan Nordin	Scuderia Gina Biasuzzi	1:52 0/0	$726,000	Moh
2006	Sand Vic	5	Brian Sears	Trond Smedshammer	August F. Miedel	1:52 3/5	$800,000	Mxx
2005	Mr. Muscleman	5	Ronald Pierce	Mike Vanderkemp	Adam Victor & Son Stable	1:52 0/0	$800,000	Moh
2004	H P Paque	7	Brian Sears	Trond Smedshammer	Timo Yli Panula & August Miedel	1:52 2/5	$800,000	Mxx
2003	Fool's Goal	8	Jack Moiseyev	Jim Doherty	Bruce McElven & Ronald Allen	1:52 4/5	$1,000,000	Wdb
2002	Fool's Goal	7	Jack Moiseyev	Jim Doherty	Bruce McElven & Ronald Allen	1:51 3/5	$1,075,000	Mxx
2001	Varenne	6	Giampaolo Minnucci	Jori Turja	Scuderia Dany	1:51 1/5	$1,000,000	Mxx
2000	Magician	5	David Miller	Earl Cruise	William C. Augenstein	1:53 1/5	$1,000,000	Mxx
1999	Supergrit	6	Ronald Pierce	Carl Conte, Jr.	Dennis A. Doyle	1:53 1/5	$630,000	Mxx
1998	Moni Maker	5	Wally Hennessey	Jimmy Takter	Moni Maker Stable	1:52 3/5	$500,000	Mxx
1997	Westgate Crown	6	John Campbell	G. R. "Raz" MacKenzie	Paul & John Simmond	1:52 4/5	$540,000	Mxx
1996	CR Kay Suzie	4	Rod Allen	Carl Allen	Carl & Rod Allen Stable	1:52 3/5	$500,000	Mxx
1995	Panifesto	5	Luc Ouellette	William Robinson	R. Peter Heffering	1:56 1/5	$300,000	Dela
1994	Pine Chip	4	John Campbell	Charles Sylvester	C. Sylvester, G. Donahue, N. Goldman, Guida Racing	1:55 2/5	$300,000	Fhl
1993	Earl	4	Chris Christoforou, Jr.	Chris Christoforou, Sr.	Banjo Farms & Chris Christoforou, Sr.	1:56 0/0	$300,000	Moh
1992	No Sex Please	7	Ron Waples	Ronald W. Waples, Jr.	Ronald W. Waples, Jr.	1:56 4/5	$300,000	Moh
1991	Billyjojimbob	4	Paul MacDonell	Mike Wade	Lori Wade	1:57 4/5	$394,000	Mea
1990	No Sex Please	5	Ron Waples	Ronald W. Waples, Jr.	Ronald W. Waples, Jr.	1:55 0/0	$221,458	Ppk
1989	Delray Lobell	4	John Campbell	Art Wirsching	LPG Standardbred Associates	1:57 2/5	$249,738	Fsr
1988	Mack Lobell	4	John Campbell	Charles Sylvester	Bladingeaas Stuteri & Louis P. Guida	1:56 0/0	$268,756	Stg
1987	Sugarcane Hanover	4	Ron Waples	James W. Simpson	John F. Simpson Sr.	1:54 3/5	$219,662	Mxx
1986	Nearly Perfect	4	Myles "Mickey" McNichol	Joe Caraluzzi	Sunbird Stables	1:57 2/5	$258,350	Lou
1985	Sandy Bowl	4	John Campbell	Sören Nordin	KVF Stables	1:56 3/5	$354,553	Spt
