= Churchill Downs Incorporated =

American entertainment company

Coordinates: 38.254977°N 85.580740°W

- Type: Public
- Traded as: Nasdaq: CHDN; S&P 400 Component
- Industry: Online gaming, gaming, entertainment and racing
- Headquarters: Louisville, Kentucky, U.S.
- Key people: William C. Carstanjen (CEO)
- Revenue: ▲US$2.93 billion (2025)
- Number of employees: 5,000
- Website: churchilldownsincorporated.com

Churchill Downs Incorporated is the parent company of Churchill Downs. The company has evolved from one racetrack in Louisville, Kentucky, to a multi American-state-wide, publicly traded company with racetracks, casinos and an online wagering company among its portfolio of businesses.

== History ==
Churchill Downs Incorporated began with the opening of a racetrack in Louisville, Kentucky, in 1875. While traveling in England and France in 1872–1873, 26-year-old Meriwether Lewis Clark devised the idea of a Louisville Jockey Club for conducting race meets. Clark toured and visited with a number of notable racing leaders, including England's Admiral Rous and France's Vicomte Darn, vice president of the French Jockey Club.

Upon his return from Europe, Clark began development of his racetrack, which would serve to showcase the Kentucky breeding industry. The track would eventually become known as Churchill Downs.

The track formally opened on May 17, 1875, with four races scheduled including the day's featured race, the Kentucky Derby.

In 1919, a syndicate of horse breeders established the Kentucky Jockey Club to consolidate the state's thoroughbred racing industry. It acquired the four major tracks in the state: Churchill Downs, Latonia Race Track, the Lexington Race Course and Douglas Park Racetrack in Louisville. Douglas Park was closed and eventually donated to the American Legion, while the Lexington track was sold to a group of local businessmen in 1923.

The Jockey Club decided to dissolve in December 1927, with the purpose of re-organizing. In January 1928, the American Turf Association was formed as the new holding company for Churchill Downs and six other tracks. The entity that is Churchill Downs Incorporated today was created at that time as the operating company for Churchill Downs.

From 1929 through 1942, the holding company started to reduce the number of tracks. By 1937, there were only three tracks left.

In January 1937, the operating companies for Churchill Downs and Latonia Race Track were merged to create Churchill Downs–Latonia Incorporated. Business at Latonia declined, and it held its last races in 1939. In 1942, the Latonia property was sold to Standard Oil of Ohio, and the operating company's name was changed to Churchill Downs, Incorporated.

The American Turf Association sold Lincoln Fields in 1947, leaving Churchill Downs as its only operation. In April 1950, Churchill Downs, Inc., became an independent company, as its stock was distributed to shareholders of the American Turf Association, which then dissolved.

After simulcasting became commonplace in the early 1990s, the racetrack decided to expand its holdings and move into the simulcasting industry. In 1991, Churchill Downs bought the struggling Louisville Downs harness track, which was closed and converted to a satellite wagering and training facility.

In 1994, Churchill Downs began to expand its holdings, with plans to partner with a new racetrack in Indiana. The plan resulted in the purchase of Hoosier Park from businessman Louis Carlo.

In 1998, CDI purchased Ellis Park Race Course near Henderson, Kentucky. In 1999, the company acquired Calder Race Course and Hollywood Park Racetrack from Pinnacle Entertainment In 2000, CDI merged with Arlington Park and the eight OTB's owned by Arlington. In 2004, Churchill Downs Incorporated finalized the purchase of Fair Grounds Race Course.

In April 2002, Churchill Downs Incorporated established the Green Pastures Program in partnership with the Thoroughbred Retirement Foundation, a leading American racehorse rescue and adoption organization.

In 2005, Hollywood Park was sold to Bay Meadows Land Company for $257.5 million, and Ellis Park was sold to businessman Ron Geary in September 2006. In December 2006, Churchill Downs Inc. sold its remaining interest in Hoosier Park to Centaur Inc. In the fall of 2007, Fair Grounds reopened to include a gaming facility adjacent to the track grandstand. In January 2010, Churchill Downs added the casino venue to Calder Race Course.

On May 2, 2007, CDI launched its advance deposit wagering service, TwinSpires (www.twinspires.com). TwinSpires.com is the official advance-deposit wagering service for Churchill Downs Incorporated and its family of racetracks, as well for the Kentucky Derby and Kentucky Oaks. TwinSpires.com offers wagering on races from the country's most popular racetracks. TwinSpires.com includes the assets of Youbet.com, which Churchill Downs Incorporated acquired in June 2010.

The company acquired Harlow's Casino Resort in Greenville, Mississippi, in December 2010 for $138 million. In October 2012, the company acquired the Riverwalk Casino and Hotel in Vicksburg, Mississippi for $141 million.

In December 2012, Churchill Downs partnered with Delaware North to buy Lebanon Raceway in Lebanon, Ohio for $60 million. Ohio had recently authorized slot machines at racetracks, which the companies took advantage of by transferring the racing license to a new $215-million facility built between Cincinnati and Dayton. The new racino, Miami Valley Gaming, opened in December 2013.

In July 2013, Churchill Downs bought the Oxford Casino in Oxford, Maine for $160 million.

In May 2014, CDI and Saratoga Casino Holdings announced a partnership to bid for the Capital Region's casino license, proposing a $300-million destination resort casino in East Greenbush, New York. In October 2014, Churchill agreed to purchase a 25 percent interest in Saratoga, and signed on to manage Saratoga Casino and Raceway, Saratoga Casino Black Hawk, and the proposed Capital View Casino & Resort. The casino proposal was rejected, however, in favor of Rivers Casino.

In December 2014, the company acquired Big Fish Games, a developer of casual games, in a deal valued at up to $885 million. It then sold Big Fish Games in 2018 to Aristocrat Leisure for $990 million.

The company partnered with Saratoga to purchase Ocean Downs, a harness racing track and casino in Maryland, in January 2017. Churchill Downs took full ownership of Ocean Downs in September 2018, swapping its 25 percent stake in Saratoga for Saratoga's 50 percent stake in the track.

In April 2017, the company purchased advance-deposit wagering website BetAmerica.

In February 2018, Churchill Downs agreed to purchase two casinos (Presque Isle Downs in Pennsylvania and Lady Luck Casino Vicksburg in Mississippi) from Eldorado Resorts for a total of $230 million. The purchase of the Lady Luck was later canceled because of antitrust concerns, and Churchill Downs instead agreed to buy the operations of Lady Luck Casino Nemacolin in Pennsylvania for $100,000. The purchases were completed in early 2019.

In September 2018, the company opened Derby City Gaming, a $65-million historical racing parlor, at the site of Louisville Downs.

In March 2019, Churchill Downs bought a 62 percent share in Rivers Casino Des Plaines, a few miles away from Arlington Park, from Neil Bluhm and his partners for $401 million. Later that year, Churchill purchased Turfway Park in Northern Kentucky for $46 million, and announced the construction of a $100-million historical racing parlor at the property.

In March 2022, Churchill Downs acquired Chasers Poker Room in Salem, New Hampshire. The company stated its interest in using the facility to launch horseracing operations on the site, making New Hampshire the fourth state in which Churchill Downs would operate horse racing.

In February 2022, Churchill Downs announced their agreement to purchase Peninsula Pacific Entertainment for $2.5bn (£1.84bn/€2.19bn). This included Churchill Downs to gain assets in Virginia and New York, in addition to the operations of its Hard Rock-branded Sioux City casino property in Iowa.

In November 2022, the company acquired the bulk of the assets of Peninsula Pacific Entertainment for $2.8 billion. The acquisition added three major properties (Colonial Downs, Del Lago Resort & Casino, and Hard Rock Hotel & Casino Sioux City) to Churchill Downs's portfolio, along with the Rosie's Gaming Emporium chain of historical racing parlors in Virginia, and the proposed One Casino & Resort in Richmond, Virginia.

== Economics and stock ==
Churchill Downs Incorporated is listed on the NASDAQ as CHDN. The company is the most profitable track owner in the horse racing industry.

== Holdings ==
Churchill Downs Incorporated owns the following racetrack and casino properties:

- Calder Casino — Miami Gardens, Florida
- Chasers Poker Room — Salem, New Hampshire
- Colonial Downs — New Kent County, Virginia
- Churchill Downs — Louisville, Kentucky
- Del Lago Resort and Casino — Tyre, New York
- Derby City Gaming — Louisville, Kentucky
- Derby City Downtown — Louisville, Kentucky
- Ellis Park Race Course — Henderson, Kentucky
- Fair Grounds Race Course and Slots — New Orleans, Louisiana
- Hard Rock Hotel & Casino Sioux City — Sioux City, Iowa
- Harlow's Casino Resort — Refuge, Mississippi
- Miami Valley Gaming — Turtlecreek Township, Ohio (50% stake)
- Newport Racing & Gaming — Newport, Kentucky
- Oak Grove Racing, Gaming & Hotel — Oak Grove, Kentucky
- Ocean Downs — Berlin, Maryland
- Oxford Casino — Oxford, Maine
- Owensboro Racing & Gaming — Owensboro, Kentucky
- Presque Isle Downs — Summit Township, Pennsylvania
- Rivers Casino — Des Plaines, Illinois (62% stake)
- Riverwalk Casino Hotel — Vicksburg, Mississippi
- Terre Haute Casino Resort — Terre Haute, Indiana
- Turfway Park — Florence, Kentucky

The company's other business holdings include:

- Bluff Media
- Rosie's Gaming Emporium
- TwinSpires
- United Tote
