= Rivers Casino (Des Plaines) =

Casino in Des Plaines, Illinois, US

- Location: Des Plaines, Illinois, United States; 3000 S River Road
- Opened: July 18, 2011
- Casino type: Land-based
- Owner: Churchill Downs Inc. (62%); Rush Street Gaming (38%)
- Public transit access: Pace
- Website: riverscasino.com/desplaines

Rivers Casino is a casino in Des Plaines, Illinois, United States, a northern suburb of Chicago. It is minutes away from O'Hare International Airport. Rivers Casino opened on July 18, 2011. It is majority-owned by Churchill Downs Inc., and managed by its minority owner, Rush Street Gaming.

The physical casino is located across River Road from the Des Plaines River, and due to state regulations (relaxed in 2019) requiring the casino to reside on a body of water as if it was a riverboat casino, river water is circulated into an inaccessible moat beneath the original building itself to fulfill what is now a nullified legal fiction.

== History ==
In 2008, the Illinois Gaming Board awarded the state's 10th and last casino license to Midwest Gaming and Entertainment LLC, a group led by Neil Bluhm, to build a 140,000-square-foot (13,000 m^{2}) casino on approximately 21 acres (8.5 ha) adjacent to the Tri-State Tollway at the northwest corner of Devon Avenue and Des Plaines River Road. Des Plaines was awarded the gaming license in 2008. The city approved zoning in early 2010. The casino opened in July 2011 as Rivers Casino.

In 2019, Churchill Downs Inc., which owned the nearby Arlington Park racetrack, purchased a 62 percent stake in the casino from Bluhm and his partners for $407 million.
