= Eric Solorio Academy High School =

Location
- 5400 S St Louis Ave; Chicago, Illinois 60632; United States; 41.7954°N 87.7116°W

Information
- School type: Public Secondary
- Opened: 2010
- School district: Chicago Public Schools
- CEEB code: 141042
- Principal: Victor Iturralde
- Grades: 9–12
- Gender: Coed
- Enrollment: 1,189 (2017-18)
- Campus type: Urban
- Colors: Maroon; Gold
- Song: Warriors
- Athletics conference: Chicago Public League
- Mascot: Sun Warrior
- Team name: Sun Warriors
- Accreditation: North Central Association of Colleges and Schools
- Yearbook: Pride
- Website: www.solorioacademy.org

Eric Solorio Academy High School is a public four-year high school located in the Gage Park neighborhood on the Southwest side of Chicago, Illinois. Solorio is part of the Chicago Public Schools district and is managed by the Academy for Urban School Leadership (AUSL).

== History ==
Eric Solorio Academy High School was named after Chicago Police Officer Eric Solorio, who died of injuries and suffered in a car accident while on patrol in 2006. Officer Solorio was raised in the southwest side of Chicago and was on-track to graduate from Loyola University Chicago with a degree in Spanish (awarded posthumously). Solorio Academy High School opened in 2010 due to rapid growth in the student population of the Southwest side. Solorio Academy was ranked as one of the top 20 public high schools in Chicago.

The building is “Gold” level certified under the U.S. Green Building Council's Leadership in Energy and Environmental Design schools’ rating system, and includes a green roof covering 40 percent of the building. It was the first to implement CPS's Urban Model High School (UMHS) design and was part of the Modern Schools Across Chicago (MSAC) program. The building contains more than 200,000 square feet and includes science, computer, visual and performing arts classrooms, as well as a library, a gymnasium, a swimming pool and playing fields and tennis courts. The school opened with grade 9 and has added a grade each school year. In June 2014, Solorio celebrated its first graduating class. In 2019, composer, producer, and alumn, MG Ricio, published the schoolsong ¨Warriors¨.

== Academics ==
Solorio offers a college preparatory curriculum, including an Advanced Placement Courses in English Language, English Literature, Environmental Science, Human Geography, US History, Psychology, Spanish Language, Spanish Literature, Biology, Physics, Calculus, Statistics, and Art. In addition to core content, each department offers a variety of electives. Solorio also was designated "Strong" in the Creative Schools Certification program.

In 2014, Solorio's ACT Composite average score was 18.9. Their 4-year cohort graduation rate was 89.2%, and their culture and climate was deemed "Well Organized" according to the results of the My School, My Voice 5 Essentials survey from the University of Chicago Consortium on Chicago School Research.

== Athletics ==
The boys' soccer team earned its first school's state championship with a 6-0 victory against Gibault Catholic High School in the 2017 IHSA 2A state championship.

=== Boys ===
- Baseball
- Basketball
- Bowling
- Cross Country
- Football
- Lacrosse
- Soccer
- Swimming
- Tennis
- Track & Field
- Volleyball
- Water Polo
- Wrestling

=== Girls ===
- Basketball
- Bowling
- Cheerleading
- Cross Country
- Lacrosse
- Pom Pom
- Soccer
- Softball
- 16" Softball
- Swimming
- Tennis
- Track & Field
- Volleyball
- Water Polo

== Clubs and activities ==
- After School Matters
- Anime Club
- Bowling
- Chess Club
- Chicago Cares
- Choir
- ComEd Youth Ambassadors
- Cooking Club
- Dance Team
- Debate
- DREAM Team
- Gay-Straight Alliance (GSA)
- Genesys Works
- Graphic Design
- Greencorps
- Green Team
- Guitar Club
- Jazz Ensemble
- Kpop Club
- Marching Band
- Math Team
- National Honor Society
- Robotics
- Student Council
- Student Newspaper
- Tennis
- Yearbook
- Washington Fellows
- WOW (Working On Womenhood)
- ZeroWaste
