= Julie Miller (disambiguation) =

Julie Miller (née Griffin, born 1956) is an American singer, songwriter and recording artist

Julie Miller may also refer to

- Julie Miller (harness racing) (born 1972), an American harness racing driver and trainer
- Julie Miller, a character from the 1982 US television series Fame, played by Lori Singer
- Buddy & Julie Miller, a 2001 album by Buddy and Julie Miller

== See also ==
- Julia Phillips (née Miller; 1944–2002), an American film producer and author
- Julie Mellor (born 1957), chair of Demos, a UK think tank
