= Ocean Downs =

Casino and harness racing track in Berlin, Maryland, US

Casino at Ocean Downs
- Interactive map of Casino at Ocean Downs
- Location: 10218 Race Track Road Berlin, Maryland, U.S.
- Coordinates: 38°21′9″N 75°9′50″W
- Owned by: Churchill Downs Inc.
- Date opened: July 25, 1949
- Race type: Harness racing
- Notable races: Maryland Sire Stakes
- Live racing handle: ▲$3,768,901 (2011)
- Attendance: ▲77,466 (2011)

Ocean Downs is a casino and harness racing track in Berlin, Maryland, near Ocean City. It is owned and operated by Churchill Downs Inc.

Construction started in 1947 as a harness racetrack, and it opened in 1949 with Ocean Downs Racing Association (ODRA) as owner. After two failing years, ODRA began to speculate about switching to thoroughbred racing, but that did not happen. In 1986, the Maryland Racing Commission was hesitant to approve race days at Ocean Downs due to the track's management. Hence, the owners of Rosecroft Raceway, a competing harness track in Maryland, purchased Ocean Downs and renamed it Delmarva Downs.

In 1987, real estate developer Mark Vogel purchased the racetrack. However, Ocean Downs went into bankruptcy in 1991, and it was sold to Fred Weisman, a California entrepreneur. Weisman died in 1994, and the track was sold again to Cloverleaf Standardbred Owners Association (CSOA) in partnership with Bally Entertainment. After the purchase, the racetrack returned to its former name, Ocean Downs. Two years later, CSOA sold Ocean Downs to Bally Entertainment because the track continued to lose money, and Bally Entertainment expected slot machines to be legalized in the state. That did not happen, and William Rickman purchased Ocean Downs from Bally Entertainment in 2000. Maryland voters approved slot machines in 2008 for five locations, including Worcester County. In 2010, construction of a $45-million casino began and opened the following year.

== History ==
The United States saw a nationwide surge of interest in harness racing in the 1940s, fueled largely by the addition of parimutuel betting, electric lights to allow night racing, and the development of the mobile starting gate. In 1947, the Maryland General Assembly (MGA) authorized up to 100 days per year of harness racing with no more than 20 racing days at one track. The Ocean Downs Racing Association (ODRA), formed by a group of Eastern Shore promoters, was one of 22 applicants to the Maryland Racing Commission (MRC) for harness racing licenses. Four applications were approved: Ocean Downs, Laurel Raceway, Rosecroft Raceway, and Baltimore Raceway.

Work on Ocean Downs began in November 1947, with plans to open the following summer, but they were delayed due to construction difficulties. Completed at a cost of $650,000, Ocean Downs opened on July 25, 1949. The track struggled initially, losing $85,000 in its first two seasons, owing to its remote location compared to the three other harness tracks. The MGA attempted to help by raising the takeout three times in ten years. Rumors surfaced Ocean Downs might switch to thoroughbred racing, and an apparent schism over the idea led to the resignation of half of the board of directors in 1957.

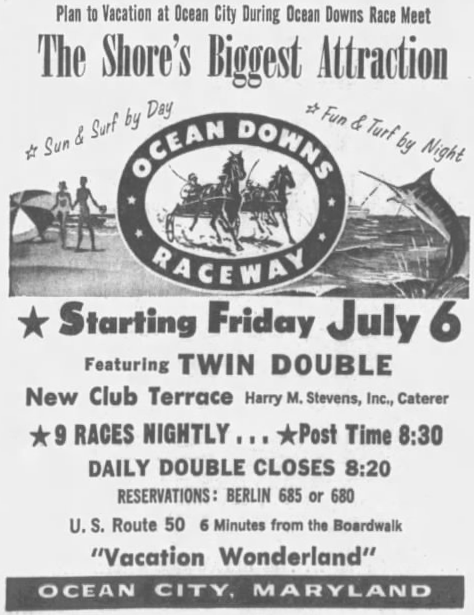
A 1969 newspaper advertisement for Ocean Downs

The racing seasons at Ocean Downs and the other harness tracks were continually extended over the years to keep pace with other mid-Atlantic tracks. By 1984, harness racing was a year-round sport in Maryland, with Ocean Downs open from May to September. In 1986, the MRC expressed grave concerns about the maintenance of Ocean Downs and said it might not approve the continued licensure of the track's management. Under pressure, the track's president, John Howard Burbage, sold his 68 percent stake to Rosecroft Raceway for $2 million. The track was renamed as Delmarva Downs the following year. In 1987, real estate developer Mark Vogel bought Rosecroft Raceway, and Delmarva Downs along with it. Vogel allegedly diverted funds from the tracks to support failed real estate ventures, and filed for bankruptcy after being arrested on drug charges. California philanthropist Frederick Weisman bought the two tracks out of bankruptcy in 1991.

Under Weisman's company, Colt Enterprises, the two tracks continued to fare poorly, losing a total of $4 million in two years, prompting Weisman to place both racetracks up for sale in 1993. Weisman died the next year, and the trustees of his estate were reluctant to invest more money in the tracks, intensifying the need for a buyer. An initial sale agreement was reached with the Cloverleaf Standardbred Owners Association, a group of 1,400 mid-Atlantic horsemen, for a total of $11 million, pending financing. With the deal still pending, Delmarva did not open in May for the 1995 season. Casino operator Bally Entertainment, hoping that Maryland would legalize slot machines at racetracks, entered with a $12 million offer for a controlling interest in the two tracks, with Cloverleaf buying a small stake. Joe De Francis, president of Pimlico and Laurel Park, fearful of outside control of the state's racing industry, made a competing offer of a $1 million loan to help Cloverleaf complete its purchase. The horsemen declined both offers, wary that Bally might have no need to continue racing after a casino were opened. Instead, a deal was reached under which Bally lent Cloverleaf $10.8 million to buy the tracks, and agreed to operate the tracks for seven years, with an option to purchase a 50 percent share if slots were legalized. Delmarva reopened under its new ownership in July.

Management changed the name back to Ocean Downs in 1996, stating that "nobody related to the name of Delmarva", and that it was sometimes confused with Del Mar Racetrack. By late 1996, Cloverleaf was losing $1.2 million annually, mostly at Ocean Downs, and the horsemen were unhappy with Bally's management of Rosecroft. Two months of negotiations were held over restructuring Cloverleaf's debts, selling Ocean Downs to Bally, and turning over operation of Rosecroft to Cloverleaf. A competing offer for the two tracks came from William Rickman, owner of Delaware Park, and De Francis expressed interest as well. A deal was finally reached, which included Bally buying Ocean Downs for $2 million, and agreeing to continue to live racing there, contingent on certain legislative relief. The sale was completed in May 1997.

Bally quickly "launched a war" against the state's thoroughbred racetracks, ending its simulcasting of thoroughbred races, and proposing to open an off-track betting parlor in Hagerstown without sharing revenues with the other tracks. That proposal was rejected by the Racing Commission, and a new simulcast agreement was reached in April 1998, prompting De Francis to remark that the two sides were finally "working in a peaceful and cooperative manner".

In 2000, Rickman agreed to buy Ocean Downs from Bally for $5.1 million, including $2.5 million to be put in escrow to cover the track's operating costs. Cloverleaf initially exercised a right of first refusal that it had negotiated as part of the sale to Bally, to be financed by a loan from the Maryland Jockey Club. Cloverleaf and MJC had partnered in a statewide revenue sharing agreement, and hoped to protect their monopoly on Maryland racing, but after performing due diligence, decided the track was losing too much money, and needed too many capital improvements. They stepped aside, and Rickman completed the purchase.

Maryland voters in 2008 approved a referendum to allow slot machines at five casinos, with one license allotted to Worcester County. Ocean Downs was the only applicant for the spot and was approved for 800 machines. The casino opened in January 2011 with 750 machines.

Ocean Downs announced a planned 50,000-square-foot expansion in September 2013, to include ten table games and a new restaurant. Table games had been authorized in Maryland casinos by a 2012 referendum. The expansion opened in December 2017.

In January 2017, Rickman sold the track to a joint venture of Churchill Downs, Inc. and Saratoga Casino Holdings. Churchill Downs took full ownership of Ocean Downs in September 2018, swapping its 25 percent stake in Saratoga for Saratoga's 50 percent stake in the track.
