= Bally's Twin River Lincoln =

Hotel and casino in Rhode Island, United States

Coordinates: 41°53′18″N 71°26′55″W

Bally's Lincoln Casino Resort
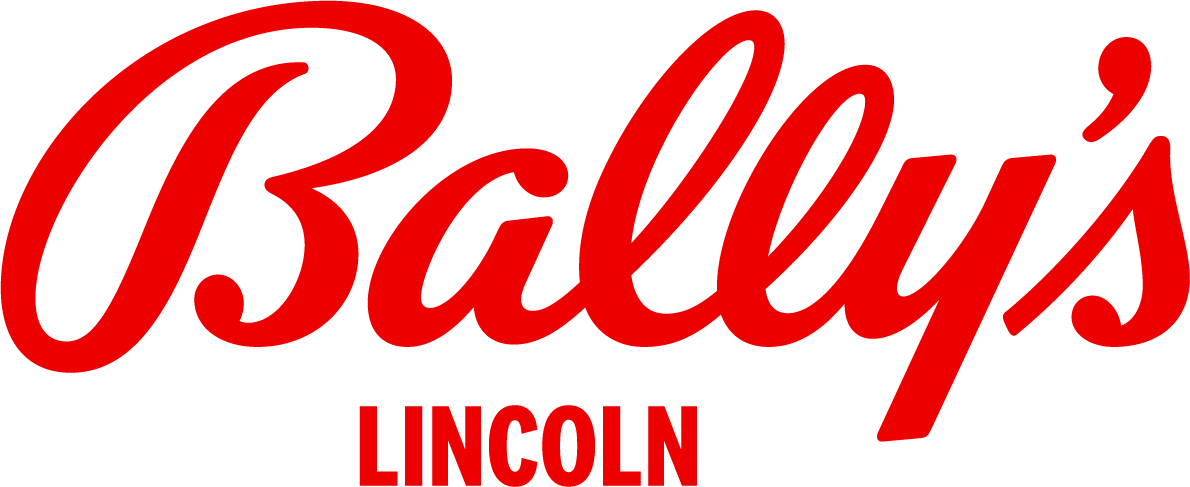
- Location: Lincoln, Rhode Island; 100 Twin River Road
- Opened: July 7, 1947; 79 years ago
- No. of rooms: 136
- Gaming space: 202,000 square feet (18,800 m^{2})
- Casino type: Land-based
- Owner: Gaming and Leisure Properties
- Operating license holder: Bally's Corporation
- Previous names: Lincoln Downs (1947–1977); Lincoln Greyhound Park (1977–1993); Lincoln Park (1993–2007); Twin River Casino (2007–2021)
- Website: casinos.ballys.com/lincoln

Bally's Twin River Lincoln Casino Resort, previously Twin River Casino Hotel, is a casino, hotel, and former race track in Lincoln, Rhode Island, owned by Gaming and Leisure Properties and operated by Bally's Corporation. The facility has 202,000 square feet (18,800 m^{2}) of gaming space, with 3,900 slot machines, 110 table games, and 32 poker tables. The hotel has 136 rooms. Other amenities include a 29,000-square-foot (2,700 m^{2}) event center, 16 eateries, 8 bars, and a racebook.

== History ==
Lincoln Downs opened on July 7, 1947. It was built by B.A. Dario, owner of the Pascoag Park Racetrack in Pascoag, Rhode Island, and accommodated 5,800 spectators in the grandstand, plus 2,000 more in the clubhouse and turf club.

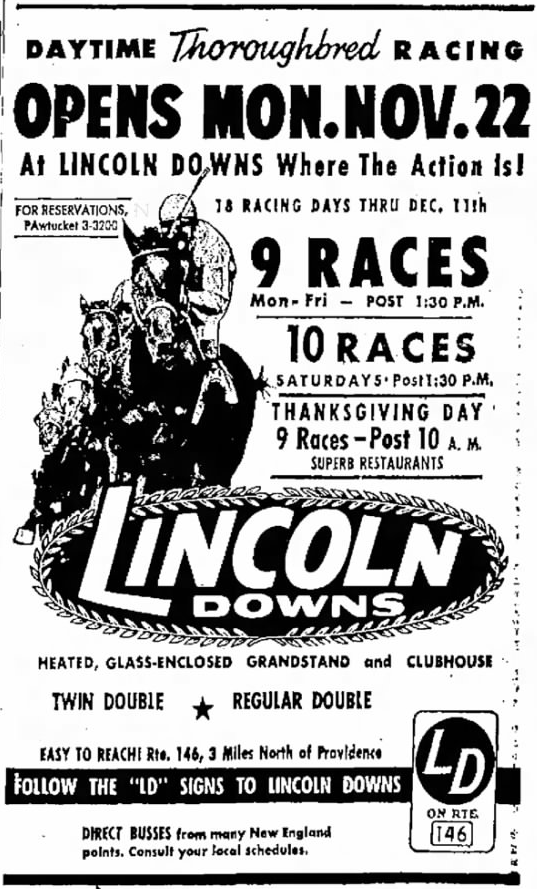
A 1965 newspaper advertisement for Lincoln Downs

In 1976, Dario closed the track early, stating that it had lost $400,000 in 28 days, due to the loss of customers to Connecticut's off-track betting and jai alai, and the state's refusal to allow the track to keep a larger share of the betting handle. Later that year, Dario sold his 82 percent controlling interest in the park to the Taunton Greyhound Association. The track was renamed as Lincoln Greyhound Park, and began its first season of greyhound racing in June 1977.

In April 1977, Dario claimed he had a deal to purchase Narragansett Park, but those claims proved unsubstantiated.

In December 1989, the owners, Alfred Ross and Joseph Linsey of Florida, agreed to sell Lincoln Greyhound Park, along with four other dog tracks in Colorado and South Dakota, for an estimated total of $80 million to United Track Racing, a joint venture between Wembley plc (the British parent company of Wembley Stadium) and United Tote (a Montana-based supplier of computerized wagering systems for racetracks). United Tote was charged with managing the tracks, due to Wembley's lack of experience in the American pari-mutuel market. Wembley bought out United Tote's 20 percent stake in the company in August 1992.

Rhode Island's 1991–92 budget authorized Lincoln and the state's other pari-mutuel facility, Newport Jai Alai, to offer off-track betting for 104 days a year. Simulcasting of horse races from other tracks began in July 1991.

In 1992, with pari-mutuel handles dropping due to competition from the newly opened Foxwoods Casino in Connecticut, Rhode Island authorized video lottery terminals with poker and blackjack games to be installed at Lincoln Park and Newport Jai Alai. Lincoln came online in September 1992 with 189 machines. By 1993, the number had increased to 900. That year, the property's name was shortened to Lincoln Park, to emphasize that it offered simulcasting and electronic gaming in addition to greyhound racing.

=== Transformation to Twin River ===
In 2003, Lincoln Park and two executives were indicted on federal charges related to an alleged scheme in 2000 and 2001 to pay up to $4 million to the law firm of Rhode Island House Speaker John Harwood to gain support for an expansion of the track's slot parlor, and to block a rival casino proposed by the Narragansett Indian Tribe. In the wake of the accusations, Governor Donald Carcieri demanded that the track be sold to new owners before negotiations could continue on the proposed expansion. A bidding war for Wembley ensued between MGM Mirage and BLB Investors (a partnership of the Waterford Group, Kerzner International, and Starwood Capital). BLB made the winning offer of $553 million in May 2004, but withdrew from the deal just two months later due to concerns about potential competition from the Narragansett casino. A new agreement was later reached for BLB to buy Wembley's five American race tracks, including Lincoln, for a total of $455 million, and the sale closed in July 2005.

BLB undertook a $220 million expansion which opened in March 2007 under a new name, Twin River Casino.

BLB filed for bankruptcy protection in 2009, and said it would have to end dog racing for the casino to survive. The company's reorganization was largely resolved by November 2010, with ownership transferred to its lenders, a group led by Bank of America, Wells Fargo, and Sankaty Advisors, but the bankruptcy case remained open until September 2011.

In November 2012, voters statewide and in Lincoln approved a referendum allowing live table games at Twin River. A similar referendum for the Newport Grand was rejected by Newport voters. Table games began operating in June 2013.

In March 2015, Twin River agreed to purchase the Newport Grand.

In 2016 Twin River was used as a filming location for Bleed for This. The opening boxing scene and a couple of casino gaming scenes.

The casino added a poker room in December 2015.

Construction began in May 2017 on a four-story hotel attached to the casino. The hotel opened in October 2018 with 136 rooms.

=== Transformation to Bally's Twin River Lincoln ===
The facility was renamed as Bally's Twin River Lincoln in November 2021, as part of its parent company's rebranding to Bally's Corporation.

In February 2023, Bally's opened a 14,000-square-foot spa. In April 2023, Bally's expanded with 40,000 square feet of new casino space, including a high-limit gaming area, and added a food hall. The expansion fulfilled a key component of the Marc A. Crisafulli Economic Development Act, enacted in 2021.

In 2026, Bally's sold the land and buildings to Gaming and Leisure Properties for $700 million and leased it back for $56 million per year.

=== Sports and mobile gambling ===
In November 2018, Twin River opened the first sportsbook in Rhode Island and began offering sports betting. In March 2019, the governor of Rhode Island, Gina Raimondo, signed a bill to allow mobile sports betting in the state, to begin on July 1. The bill allowed for the creation of an app to allow remote placing of sports bets at Twin River Casino. The state had legalized sports betting the year before, when the U.S. Supreme Court struck down a federal law forbidding most sports gambling in the country.

Bally Interactive introduced Rhode Island's first and only online casino experience, available by web or mobile app, in 2024.
