= Louisville Downs =

American harness race track in Kentucky

Coordinates: 38.1871°N 85.7085°W

Louisville Downs was a half-mile Standardbred harness race track located in Louisville, Kentucky, United States. It opened in 1966 and held over 3,400 days of harness racing until it was sold to Churchill Downs Inc. in 1991. Louisville Downs was built and managed by William H. King, a Louisville entrepreneur and promoter, who was the first to offer wagering by phone (“Call-a-Bet”) and full card simulcast wagering to television viewers. The track is now the site of Derby City Gaming, a historical racing parlor opened in 2018.

== History ==
King was a well-known promoter of entertainment events in Louisville. Prior to launching Louisville Downs, he had gained local renown for presenting sport, boat and vacation shows and events at the Kentucky Fair and Exposition Center. One of his most significant promotions was of 18-year-old Cassius Clay’s first professional fight on October 29, 1960 versus Tunney Hunsaker at Fairgrounds Coliseum.

In 1965, King and a group of investors which included Raymund Kolowich, R. Victor Mosley and Fred Somes, formed Louisville Downs, Inc. to purchase an 80-acre plot at 4520 Poplar Level Road on the southwestern edge of Louisville, Kentucky. King led the development of Louisville Downs, designed by architect John H. Menges of Thayer-Menges and Associates of New Castle, Pennsylvania and constructed by Mainstream Corporation based in Pittsburgh, PA. Construction was begun in September of 1965 and completed in June, 1966.

Officers and directors of Louisville Downs, Inc. at the time of its launch included King (President and General Manager), Kolowich (Chairman of the Board), Peter Miller, Fred Somes, Jr. Jack Drees, John H. Menges and Chris Duvall.

== Facilities and track ==
Called “one of the most innovative and progressive Standardbred racing venues in the country," Louisville Downs seated 4,621 total, with a 2,954-seat glass-enclosed grandstand topped with an iconic peppermint-striped roof. Seating also included a 300-seat clubhouse, 400-seat dining terrace, 860 railbird box seats and 107 royal box seats. The stables included eight 60-stall barns and three paddock buildings with 40 stalls. The 1/2 mile track had a limestone base topped with 4” of limestone dust, new to harness racing at the time.

Louisville Downs held its first race on July 14, 1966, opening a 51-night meeting that ran through September 10, 1966. Opening night drew 3,490 fans betting $102,098 on ten races. Charming Lad won the first race, paying $14, and Honor Time was the length winner, paying $3.60. Ten years later, Louisville Downs began its most successful period, with an average daily attendance of over 3,000 fans and over $220,000 in wagers.

King, whom the Courier-Journal once called the “track’s longtime marketing mastermind,” continued to hone his promotional expertise for Louisville Downs through various crowd-drawing promotions, including Quarter Night (Parking, admission, hot dogs, beer and soft drinks all 25c), giveaways and cash drawings. In March, 1981, King created a dial-in betting system called Call-A-Bet, the first advance-deposit wagering system in the country, and in 1988 instituted full-card simulcast racing. In 1978, Louisville Downs hosted its first run of the Kentucky Pacing Derby, part of the Triple Crown for 2-year-old pacers. The race was held each September and attracted the best 2-year-old pacers in the world, including Niatross, the first pacer to break the 1:50 time barrier.

== Other events ==
King brought non-harness racing spectators to Louisville Downs by hosting additional sport and music events. American Motorcycle Association held its Half-Mile Grand National Championship races there from 1967 until 1991. One of Louisville's first Fourth of July fireworks shows set to music was held at Louisville Downs in 1976, with a water skiing show held on the large infield lake. Some of the musical talents who appeared at Louisville Downs were:

- The Guess Who, May 1974
- Beach Boys, May 1974
- Sha Na Na, July 1974
- Three Dog Night, July 1975
- Earl Scruggs and Emmylou Harris, July 1976

== Sale to Churchill Downs ==
Harness racing ended at Louisville Downs in 1991, when Churchill Downs Inc. purchased the 87-acre site for $6 million, using the grandstand for simulcast racing and racetrack for training thoroughbreds. The grandstand was razed in 2015. In September 2018, Churchill Downs opened Derby City Gaming, a historical racing facility, at the site. Harness racing may return to the former Louisville Downs site; in September 2018, Churchill Downs and Keeneland Association filed an application with the Kentucky Horse Racing Commission to hold 10 days of harness meets in 2019.
