= H2Oi =

Annual car meet in Ocean City, Maryland

H2Oi (an abbreviation of "water cooled import vehicles") is an annual car meetup in Ocean City, Maryland, usually occurring over the final weekend of September. The original event was open to showcase water cooled Audi and Volkswagen cars.

== History ==
The event began as a small annual meetup of car enthusiasts around 1997, with the location shifting to Ocean Downs in Berlin, Maryland around 2000. Attendance grew over the next decade, reaching 6,000 attendees by 2010. Major police interactions with event participants began around this time, and the event began shifting to different locations in Worcester County. In 2012 the event officially moved to a campground near Whaleyville, Maryland, but unofficial racing and partying took place elsewhere, particularly in Ocean City. The event continued to grow, and in 2017 the event organizer cancelled that year's event over "venue issues and logistical problems." Despite the official cancellation, the event continued unofficially and was described as "rowdier than ever" by Jalopnik.
