= Derrick R. Wood =

American politician and businessperson

- Born: Silver Spring, Maryland
- Citizenship: American
- Occupations: Politician, businessperson
- Years active: 2018 – present
- Website: derrickrwood.com

Derrick R. Wood is an American politician and businessperson serving as the mayor of Dumfries, Virginia, since 2018. A member of the Democratic Party, Wood is the second African American elected to the office in the town's history.

== Career ==
Wood was elected to the Dumfries Town Council in 2012. In 2018, he was elected mayor and re-elected in 2022. During his tenure, several development initiatives were launched in Dumfries, including the proposed $400 million Rose Gaming Resort (Northern Virginia's first casino gaming resort) and plans for waterfront redevelopment. The closure of the Potomac Landfill and the widening of U.S. Route 1 were also completed during his time in office. As of 2024, Wood presided over Virginia’s only all-Black town council. He has served on the Northern Virginia Transportation Authority, and held positions with the Virginia Municipal League and the National League of Cities.

In 2021, Wood launched a podcast titled Spotlight Dumfries, focused on local events and community members. In addition, he owns Dyvine BBQ in Motion, a barbecue catering business. Later in 2024, the business was cited for regulatory violations.

He is also the author of two self-published books including Building Business Credit (2021) and The Parables of Purpose: Finding Your Calling in the Midst of Chaos (2023). In 2024, he received the Presidential Lifetime Achievement Award from RiseHer Network followed by the National Service to Youth Award from the Boys & Girls Clubs of America in 2025.

== Personal life ==
Wood is married and has three children. He is a member of Phi Beta Sigma fraternity.
