= Miami Valley Gaming =

Casino in Turtlecreek Township, Ohio

Coordinates: 39.443335°N 84.319725°W

- Interactive map of Miami Valley Gaming
- Location: Turtlecreek Township, Ohio; 6000 St Rt 63
- Opened: December 12, 2013
- Gaming space: 186,000 sq ft (17,300 m^{2})
- Casino type: Racino
- Owner: Delaware North Companies (50%); Churchill Downs Inc. (50%)
- Website: miamivalleygaming.com

Miami Valley Gaming is a harness racing track and racino in Turtlecreek Township, Ohio. It opened in 2013 as a replacement for Lebanon Raceway, located in nearby Lebanon. The track conducts seasonal live racing Sunday-Thursday afternoons. The track offers simulcasting from North American harness tracks seven days a week.

After Governor John Kasich approved video lottery terminals at Ohio racetracks in 2011, a joint venture of Churchill Downs Inc. and Delaware North Companies agreed in March 2012 to buy Lebanon Raceway from the Nixon and Carlo families for $60 million, and planned to transfer its license to a new $215-million racino to be built several miles away. The purchase was completed in December 2012. The casino at the new location opened on December 12, 2013. In 2017, Miami Valley Gaming spent $5 million on expansion, adding new patio and high limit areas.

In November 2020, during the COVID-19 pandemic in Ohio, the Miami Valley Gaming announced that they would change their operating hours due to the statewide curfew imposed by Governor Mike DeWine.
