= Oxford Congregational Church and Cemetery =

Historic site in Maine, United States

- U.S. National Register of Historic Places
- U.S. Historic district
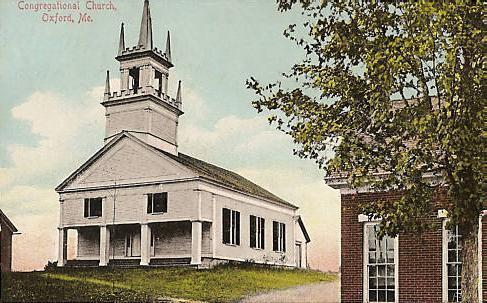
- A 1910 postcard view, without the 1956 T addition

- Location within Maine Location within the United States
- Location: King St. E side, 0.2 mi. N of jct. with ME 121, Oxford, Maine
- Coordinates: 44°8′2″N 70°29′30″W
- Area: 4 acres (1.6 ha)
- Built: 1842
- Architect: Cochrane, Harry
- Architectural style: Greek Revival, Gothic Revival
- NRHP reference No.: 94000637
- Added to NRHP: June 24, 1994

The Oxford Congregational Church and Cemetery is a historic church and cemetery in Oxford, Maine, located on the east side of King Street, 0.2 miles (0.32 km) north of its junction with Maine State Route 121. Built in 1842-3, the church is architecturally significant as a good local example of Greek Revival and Gothic Revival style, and is artistically significant for a decorative stenciled trompe-l'œil artwork on the ceiling and sanctuary end wall. The property was listed on the National Register of Historic Places in 1994.

== Description ==
The Oxford Congregational Church is a T-shaped wood frame structure, sheathed partially in clapboard and partially in aluminum siding, with gable roofs on both sections of the T. The main sanctuary is fronted by a colonnade of four paneled posts, above which is an enclosed area housing a gallery. The main entrance, centered on this facade, consists of a set of double doors, flanked by sidelight windows with diamond lights. The gallery area has two symmetrical placed sash windows, and pilasters continue the supporting posts up to the fully pedimented gable end. Above the entrance rises a square tower, whose stages have pilastered corners, parapeted edges, and spires at the corners. The second stage, housing the bell, has square louvered openings. The tower is topped by a square steeple stylistically matching the corner spires. The sides of the main block have three tall sash windows. Behind the main block is the top of the T, a crosswise two-story frame section built in 1956.

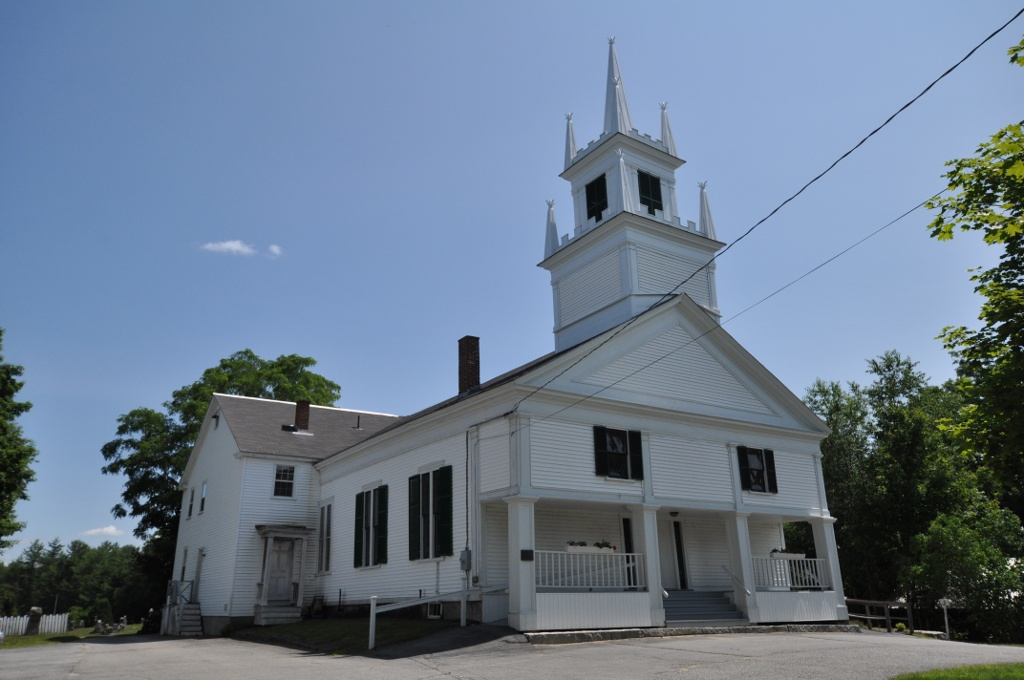
The church in 2014

The interior of the main block begins with a vestibule area, from which stairs lead to the gallery on either side, and doorways lead into the nave. The nave has the original wooden box pews with Greek Revival woodwork. The doorways leading to the nave are framed by paneled pilasters with Gothic Revival woodwork. The interior of the nave and sanctuary are most notable for the trompe-l'œil art work, which (needing restoration) is believed to give the appearance of much greater size to the interior. It is believed to have been added c. 1880, during one of the periodic redecorations of the building. Other stenciled artwork is known to have been added in 1913 by Monmouth artist Harry Cochrane, and in 1945 by R. J. Morin.

The Oxford congregation was organized in 1826, and originally shared a meeting house with the local Baptist congregation. The growth in size of the latter forced the Congregationalists from those premises in 1840, and they temporarily met in a local schoolhouse until the present building was built in 1842-3. The distinctive colonnaded front is believed to be one of the early examples of this form, which appears in only a few surviving churches in Maine.

== See also ==
- National Register of Historic Places listings in Oxford County, Maine
