= Andy Miller (harness racing) =

American harness racing driver (born 1968)

Andy Ray Miller
Personal information
- Born: September 7, 1968 (age 57) Mattoon, Illinois, United States
- Occupation: Harness racing driver

Horse racing career
- Sport: Horse racing
- Career wins: 8452 wins (as at 11/22/2016)

Major racing wins
- Glen Garnsey Memorial Pace (2003); American National Pace (2007); Hambletonian Oaks (2008); Nat Ray Trot (2009); William R. Haughton Memorial Pace (2012); Breeders Crown wins: Breeders Crown 2YO Filly Pace (2004, 2012); Breeders Crown Open Trot (2009); Breeders Crown 2YO Colt & Gelding Pace (2014)

Significant horses
- Creamy Mimi, Lucky Jim, Perfect Alliance

Andy Ray Miller (born September 7, 1968) is an American harness racing driver. Miller's nickname is "The Orange Crush."

== Biography ==
Andy Miller, who was born in Mattoon, Illinois, started driving in 1985 on the Illinois fair circuit. By 1996, he had topped the $1 million mark in purses. Miller, who won driving titles at Balmoral and Maywood Parks in the 1990s, relocated to New Jersey along with his wife in 2006. Miller won his 5,000th race that same year.

Miller represented the United States in the 2005 and 2007 World driving championships. He drove trotter Creamy Mimi to victories in the 2007 American National and 2008 Hambletonian Oaks. He has over 8,000 career wins and purse earnings totaling in excess of $100 million.

Miller drove 2009 Dan Patch Award winner Lucky Jim.

In April 2014, Miller was injured while racing at Yonkers Raceway. Miller, who had suffered a pair of fractured lumbar vertebrae in his accident, returned to driving six months later.

== Family ==
Miller, along his wife Julie, who is a harness racing trainer, live in Millstone Township, New Jersey. They have two children. Miller is the brother of harness racing trainer Erv Miller.
