= 2018 Idaho Proposition 1 =

Proposition 1
- Authorize Betting on Historical Horse Races Initiative

Results
Choice	Votes	%
Yes	278,212	46.20%
No	323,924	53.80%
Valid votes	602,136	100.00%
Invalid or blank votes	0	0.00%
Total votes	602,136	100.00%

Yes
80–90%
70–80%
60–70%
50–60%
No
90–100%
80–90%
70–80%
60–70%
50–60%
Other
Tie
No votes

Idaho Proposition 1 (2018) was a ballot initiative titled the "Save Horse Racing in Idaho Act". Voters failed to pass the initiative during the general election held on November 6, 2018; the proposition would have allowed a limited number of Idaho racetracks to operate historical racing gaming terminals. Proposition 1 was an effort to restore a law that previously allowed historical racing in Idaho.

In the 2018 vote for Idaho Proposition 1; 278,212 (46.20%) voted to save historical horse racing while 323,924 (53.80%) voted against Idaho Proposition 1. 45,713 voters would have been needed in order to pass Idaho Proposition 1.

== Proponents ==
Treasure Valley Racing is credited with authoring Proposition 1, and was also the primary contributor to the Committee to Save Idaho Horse Racing, Create Jobs, and Fund Public Schools political action committee.

== Opponents ==
The Coeur d'Alene tribe was the primary contributor for two political action committees that opposed the measure. In 2018, the North Idaho Voter Project PAC was created by representatives of the Coeur d'Alene tribe. Representatives of the North Idaho Voter Project PAC were accused of following and harassing Proposition 1 canvassers (signature gatherers) who were attempting to acquire enough signatures to place the Prop 1 question on the 2018 ballot. The same PAC was also accused of attempting to bribe Proposition 1 canvassers to quit gathering signatures. The second opposition PAC is titled Idaho United Against Prop 1, and lists the chairman of the Coeur d'Alene Tribal Council, "Ernie" Stensgar, as the Treasurer.

== History ==
The Idaho legislature voted to allow historical horse racing at horse race tracks in 2013. In 2015 horse races in Idaho brought in about $50 million in annual payroll, and sales. In 2015 a lobbyist for the Coeur d'Alene tribe introduced Senate Bill 1011 (2015) to the Idaho Senate State Affairs Committee. This repealed historical racing in Idaho. Later in 2015 a gubernatorial veto to protect historical horse racing was invalid due to the timing of the veto Tribal representatives testified during the 2015 legislative hearings for Senate Bill 1011 that they were worried historical racing terminals would negatively impact their own tribal casino revenues. This caused all horse race tracks to close and over 535 jobs were lost.

== Funding ==
Chairman of the Coeur d'Alene Tribal Council, "Ernie" Stensgar reported on behalf of the Idaho United Against Prop 1 political action committee, that the Idaho United Against Prop 1 PAC had received $6.55 Million and spent $5.67 Million through October 31, 2018 to persuade voters against Prop 1.

Bruce Newcomb, a former Speaker of the House for the Idaho House of Representatives, is listed as Chairman for the Committee to Save Idaho Horse Racing, Create Jobs, and Fund Public Schools political action committee. Through October 31, 2018, the Committee to Save Idaho Horse Racing PAC raised $5.94 Million and spent $4.59 Million in support of Prop 1.
