= Ellis Park Race Course =

Horse racing track in Kentucky

- Interactive map of Ellis Park Race Course
- Location: 3300 US-41, Henderson, KY 42420
- Coordinates: 37°54′58″N 87°32′39″W
- Owned by: Churchill Downs Incorporated
- Date opened: 1922
- Race type: Thoroughbred
- Course type: Outer ring of Dirt; Inner ring of Turf

Ellis Park is a thoroughbred racetrack near Henderson, Kentucky, along US 41 between the Twin Bridges and Evansville, Indiana. It is owned and operated by Churchill Downs Incorporated. While the track is located north of the Ohio River that forms the border between Kentucky and Indiana, which would put it within Indiana, the border is based on the course of the river at the time Kentucky became a state in 1792.

Ellis Park was previously owned by Ellis Entertainment, a subsidiary of Laguna Development Corporation based out of New Mexico. In September 2022 Ellis Park was purchased by Churchill Downs Incorporated, owners of the thoroughbred track bearing the same name.

== History ==
Ellis Park was built by the Green River Jockey Club in 1922. It initially held a harness meeting on the Grand Circuit for the total of $32,000 in purses for a five-day race meeting. On November 10, 1922, a 10-day thoroughbred meet with purses of $62,000 was held. The meet was a stop on the train route south to New Orleans for winter racing at Fair Grounds Race Course.

These short meets did not meet the needs of the track and in 1925, after three years of operation, the Green River Jockey Club went bankrupt. In 1925 James C. Ellis, a Rockport businessman, purchased the track, then called Dade Park. He brought about many changes at the track including adding a tote board wagering system and a terrace grandstand. The facility was renamed Ellis Park in 1954. James Ellis died in 1956.

The track management was then led by Ellis's nephew, Lester E. Yeager. Under Yeager's leadership, a new paddock and jockeys' quarters were built, as well as a new clubhouse and stable areas. He gave leadership to Ruth Adkins in the mid-1960s.

Adkins was the chief officer of the James C. Ellis estate, which still owned the track, businesses, and real estate in Kentucky and Indiana. The track was sold in 1985 to Roger and Lila Kumar. They built a sky terrace atop the Grandstand and pushed for the inter-track wagering legislation in Kentucky. They, in turn, sold the track to the Racing Corporation of America in 1989. The company sold the track to Churchill Downs Incorporated in 1998.

The racetrack suffered extensive damage, as well as the death of several racehorses, when a tornado ripped through the area on November 6, 2005.

On July 17, 2006, Ellis Park was purchased by Ron Geary, a Kentucky businessman, from Churchill Downs Incorporated for an undisclosed sum of money. The track's dates would be shifted so racing would begin at Ellis Park on the Fourth of July, which would have Ellis overlapping the final week of racing at Churchill Downs. The 2007 meet was highlighted by the Claiming Crown, the first running of the Claiming Crown in the state of Kentucky and the first time the Claiming Crown would be held elsewhere other than Canterbury Park since Philadelphia Park hosted the 2002 edition.

On July 2, 2008, Ellis Park owner Ron Geary announced that he would close the track, after a federal judge denied an injunction against the Horsemen's Benevolent and Protective Association in an ongoing dispute over simulcast wagering revenues. However, on July 5, a deal was struck between Ellis Park and the association that would reopen the track. Under this agreement, horsemen would get a larger share of wagering revenues.

On March 9, 2009, Geary notified the Kentucky Horse Racing Commission that he would have a reduced racing schedule that year and planned to close the track the following year, citing a lack of purse money compared to other courses and a lack of horses. However, Ellis Park remained open for the 2010 season with the opening race occurring on July 10, 2010.

In 2012, Geary sold a 30 percent stake in Ellis Park to the Saratoga Casino and Raceway for $4 million, to help fund the installation of Instant Racing machines. Saratoga purchased the remaining 70 percent in 2018. In June 2019 Ellis Park was sold to Ellis Entertainment a subsidiary of Laguna Development Corporation based in Albuquerque, New Mexico. Ellis Entertainment has plans for investing $60 million to build a new historical racing facility, widening of the turf course, installing lights for the track and improving barns and restaurants throughout the facility.

Among the stakes race run at Ellis Park is their signature race and only Graded stakes race the Groupie Doll Stakes which is a Grade III event. Other listed stakes races that are run at Ellis Park include the Ellis Park Breeders' Cup Turf, Governor's Handicap, Tri-State Handicap, Audubon Oaks and the increasingly important Ellis Park Derby which in 2020 became a qualifying race for the Kentucky Derby with the winner receiving 50 points on the Road to the Kentucky Derby.

On September 15, 2022, Churchill Downs Incorporated announced that it had entered into an agreement to buy back the Ellis Park property for $79 million. The Kentucky Horse Racing Commission approved the purchase in a special meeting on September 20, and the sale closed six days later. The acquisition also includes Ellis Park's future gaming and simulcasting facility in Owensboro.

In June 2023, due to concerns over twelve horse fatalities, Churchill Downs transferred its spring-summer racing meet to Ellis Park aligning with a recommendation from the Horseracing Integrity and Safety Authority.

== Physical attributes ==
The track was designed after the Saratoga Race Course in Saratoga Springs, New York, and features a 1.125-mile dirt track (1.8 km). The track features chutes for seven-furlong (1.4 km) and one-mile (1.6 km) races. A one-mile (1.6 km) turf course was installed in 1993. The facility is 210 acres (0.85 km^{2}) and has a 6,000-seat grandstand and 38 barns. It is one of two tracks in the country to contain a one-mile (1.6 km) chute at a 90-degree angle by the first turn. The chute is modeled after the Wilson Mile Chute at Saratoga Race Course.
