= Rosie's Gaming Emporium =

American brand of casinos

- Industry: Gambling
- Founded: April 2019; 6 years ago
- Headquarters: New Kent, Virginia, United States
- Number of locations: 7 (2023)
- Area served: Virginia, United States
- Owner: Churchill Downs, Inc.
- Website: rosiesgaming.com

Rosie's Gaming Emporium is a chain of gambling parlors in the U.S. state of Virginia, owned by Churchill Downs, Inc. and affiliated with its Colonial Downs racetrack. The Rosie's brand was established in 2019. As of 2023, there are seven Rosie's locations throughout Virginia, including a parlor at Colonial Downs in New Kent; five standalone parlors in Dumfries, Emporia, Hampton, Richmond, and Vinton; and a Rosie's Game Room in Collinsville within a Quality Inn hotel. A $389-million Rosie's property called The Rose Gaming Resort is under construction in Dumfries.

Rosie's parlors offer off-track betting and historical horse racing machines that resemble slot machines and allow betting on archived horse races. They do not feature any table games or traditional slot machines.

== History ==
The background of Rosie's can be traced to 1992, when Virginia authorized up to six off-track betting (OTB) parlors to be operated by the state's yet-to-be-built horse track, subject to local referendum in each city or county. The first OTB parlor opened in 1996, ahead of Colonial Downs's opening in 1997. In 2004, the number of allowed parlors was increased to ten. In 2014, Colonial Downs closed and ended its OTB operations.

In 2018, Virginia enacted a law to authorize historical horse racing machines at Colonial Downs and its OTB parlors, in an effort to make it economically viable to reopen the track. The Virginia Racing Commission subsequently adopted regulations capping the total number of machines in the state at 3,000.

The first Rosie's location was opened at Colonial Downs in New Kent on April 23, 2019, with 600 machines. Three standalone Rosie's locations opened later in 2019, with the Vinton location opening on May 9, the Richmond location on July 1, and the Hampton location on October 29. These first parlors were opened in localities where voters had previously approved off-track betting.

Voters in Dumfries approved off-track betting in November 2019, giving Rosie's access to the populous Northern Virginia market. Construction on the fifth Rosie's Gaming Emporium in Dumfries began in 2020, and the location opened on January 8, 2021. Later that year, on July 22, Rosie's opened its sixth location, a 37-machine parlor at a Quality Inn hotel in Collinsville, branded as Rosie's Game Room.

In 2022 Colonial Downs's parent company, Peninsula Pacific Entertainment, sold the bulk of its assets, including Rosie's and Colonial Downs, to Churchill Downs, Inc.

A seventh location in Emporia opened on September 25, 2023.

== The Rose Gaming Resort ==
On February 15, 2021 a proposal was revealed by Colonial Downs for a $389 million Rosie's-branded gaming resort called The Rose Gaming Resort, which would stand on the site of the Potomac Landfill in Dumfries and be the only gaming resort in Northern Virginia. The Dumfries Town Council approved the project on September 21, 2021. Construction of the resort began in January 2022 as the landfill closed, with plans to open in late 2023 and total completion of the two phases expected in 2026. The resort will feature a 50,000-sq-ft gaming facility, 305 hotel rooms, 8 restaurants, a theater, and conference rooms, with the remaining unused 79 acres being converted into a park.

The $460 million facility which includes a gaming floor featuring 1,650 slots-like betting machines, had a soft launch on Wednesday, October 23, according to Dumfries Mayor Derrick R. Wood. Since The Rose is associated with horse racing, like Rosie’s other gaming establishments, it includes an off-track betting room open seven days a week, allowing patrons to place bets on live horse races. A grand opening event and ribbon-cutting is planned for Thursday, November 7. The resort is projected to generate $35.5 million in annual tax revenue, which will be split between Dumfries, Prince William County, the state of Virginia and the state racing commission. The town of Dumfries is expected to get about 25% of the tax dollars generated, Wood said.
