= Julie Miller (harness racing) =

American harness racer (born 1972)

Julie E. Miller
Personal information
- Nationality: American
- Born: November 21, 1972 (age 53) Iowa City, Iowa
- Occupations: Harness racing driver and trainer

Horse racing career
- Sport: Horse racing

Major racing wins
- Breeders Crown Open Trot (2009)

Significant horses
- Lucky Jim; Perfect Alliance

Julie E Miller (born November 21, 1972) is an American harness racing driver and trainer.

== Biography ==
Miller, who was born in Iowa City, Iowa, drove her first winner at Quad City Downs in 1993. She has a bachelor's degree in science from Southern Illinois University.

Julie Miller was elected to the board of trustees for the Harness Horse Youth Foundation in 2008.

Miller trained 2009 Dan Patch award winner Lucky Jim.

In February 2016, Miller along with another harness driver were charged with allowing horses to race with the drug Glaucine in their system. Miller denied the accusations. Less than two years earlier Miller had said in an interview that it was disappointing that drugs was one of the major things talked about in harness racing.

== Family ==
Miller, along with her husband Andy who is a harness racing driver, live in Millstone Township, New Jersey. They have two children. Harness racing trainer Erv Miller is her brother-in-law.
