= Quad City Downs =

Horse racing track in East Moline, Illinois

Coordinates: 41°31′35″N 90°23′18.8″W

- Location: 5005 Morton Drive, East Moline, Illinois
- Owned by: Churchill Downs Inc., Arlington Park
- Course type: Flat

Quad City Downs was a horse race track in East Moline. The track ran live harness races from the mid 1970s through the early 1990s. The track originally opened under the name "East Moline Downs" (EMD). After financial difficulties in the first few years of operation, the track reorganized under the name Quad City Downs (QCD). The track ran simulcasts live Thoroughbred and Harness racing from tracks across the country until January 31, 2015 when the track was permanently closed.

== Recent history ==
In 2012 the Illinois House passed a bill which allowed slot machines to operate in the facility. Some hopefuls thought the gambling expansion would bring live racing back to the track.

It was announced on January 9, 2015 that Quad City Downs would close by the end of the month. The primary reason cited was competition by legal slot machines in Illinois bars and restaurants. The Quad City Downs closed on January 31, 2015
