= Oxford Casino =

Casino hotel in Oxford, Maine

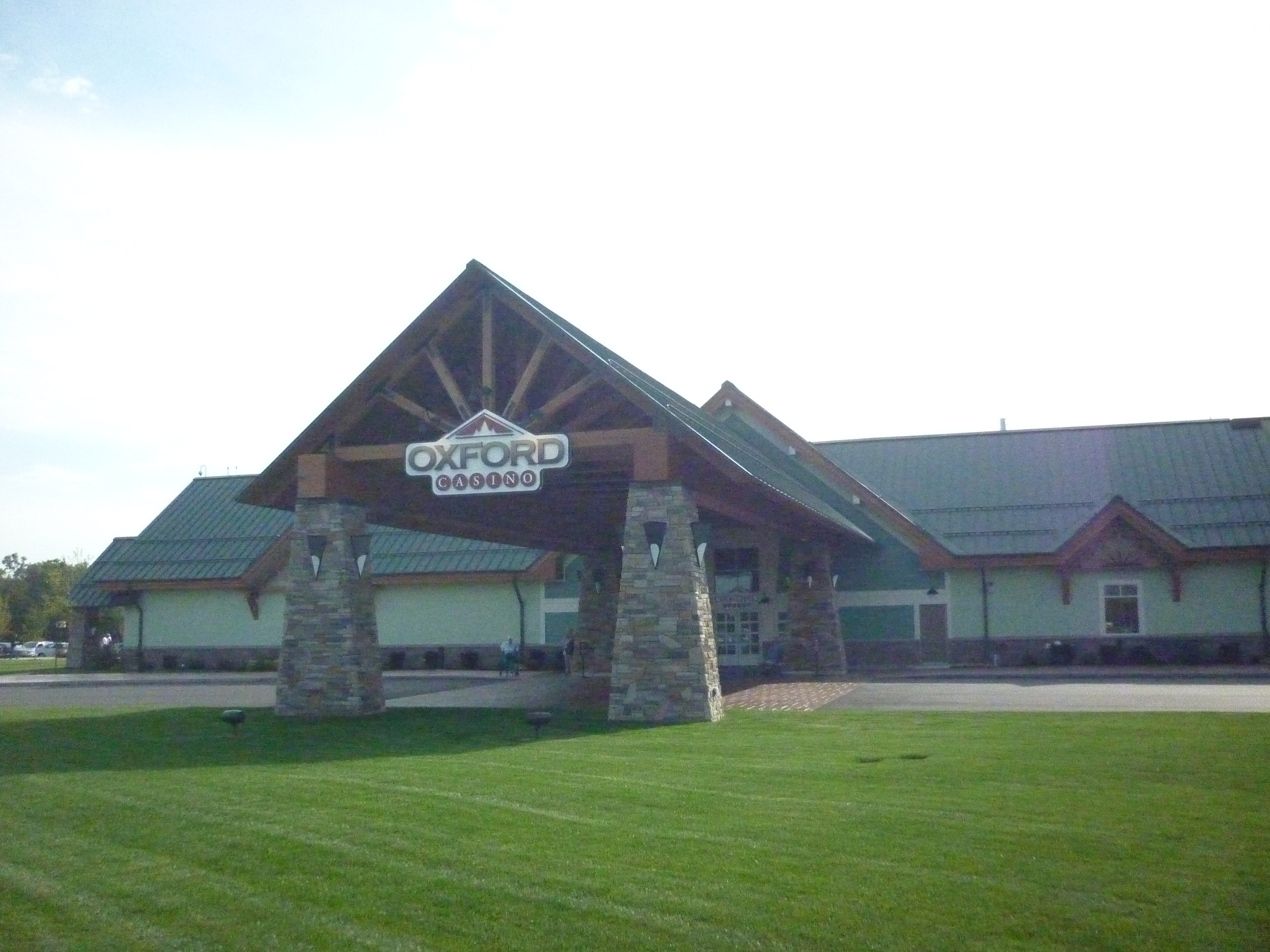
- Interactive map of Oxford Casino
- Location: Oxford, Maine; 777 Casino Way; 44°06′55″N 70°26′45″W
- Opened: June 5, 2012
- No. of rooms: 107 (including 7 suites)
- Casino type: Land-based
- Owner: Churchill Downs Inc.
- Website: oxfordcasino.com

The Oxford Casino is a hotel and casino in Oxford, Maine, owned and operated by Churchill Downs Inc. It has 27,000 square feet (2,500 m^{2}) of gaming space, with 970 slot machines and 28 table games. The hotel is four stories, with 107 rooms. There are two eateries at the property.

The casino was approved by voters in a statewide referendum in 2010, and opened on June 5, 2012. An expansion opened in September 2012. Early in its development, the project was called the Black Bear Four Season Resort and Casino.

In March 2013, Black Bear Development agreed to sell the casino to Churchill Downs Inc. for $160 million. The acquisition was completed in July 2013.

Churchill Downs announced a $25-million expansion plan for the casino in April 2016, including the addition of a hotel. In November 2017, the hotel, new dining venues, and an expansion of the gaming floor opened.

== See also ==
- Gambling in Maine
