= Rosecroft Raceway =

Harness racing track in Fort Washington, Maryland, US

Coordinates: 38°47′43″N 76°57′36″W

- The front of the Rosecroft Raceway, in May 2012.
- Interactive map of Rosecroft Raceway
- Location: 6336 Rosecroft Drive; Fort Washington, Maryland, United States
- Owned by: The Stronach Group
- Date opened: May 26, 1949; August 25, 2011
- Date closed: July 1, 2010
- Race type: Harness racing
- Notable races: Maryland Sire Stakes
- Live racing handle: ▲$842,763 (2011)
- Attendance: ▼135,138 (2009)

Rosecroft Raceway, nicknamed the "Raceway by the Beltway" for being close to Interstate 495, is a harness racing track in Fort Washington, Maryland. It first opened in 1949 and was owned by William E. Miller, a horse trainer and breeder. Rosecroft quickly became Prince George's County's political and social center, drawing thousands of people there each racing day. In the early 1950s, average attendance was more than 7,000 per day. After Miller died in 1954, his son John owned Rosecroft until his death in 1969. Rosecroft hosted memorial stake races annually for both William and John until 1995. Following the death of John Miller, Earle Brown controlled operations until he moved to a different position in 1980; William E. Miller II took over following Brown.

Rosecroft was sold to Mark Vogel in 1987. Vogel made several mistakes that hurt the horse racing industry in Maryland. Three years later, he was arrested for possession of cocaine, and his company went into bankruptcy. Rosecroft was sold to Weisman's Colt Enterprises in 1991. In that same year, the grandstand caught fire and was reconstructed in 1993 for $3.6 million. In 1995, after losing millions, the relatives of Weisman sold Rosecroft to Cloverleaf Enterprises. In the 2000s, Cloverleaf attempted to sell Rosecroft multiple times, but due to lawsuits and politics, all the potential buyers became uninterested. Nearby states legalized casinos to help their racetracks. Money generated from the casinos was used to increase the purses and handle (daily betting turnover), and Rosecroft was unable to produce the same amount of money. After filing for bankruptcy once again, Rosecroft Raceway closed down in 2010. The next year, Penn National Gaming purchased the racetrack with the hope to make it a racino, and Rosecroft reopened in 2011.

Throughout Rosecroft's history, it has featured notable races. From 1984 to 1988, it hosted segments of the Breeders Crown. Starting in 1990 and ending in 1995, the racetrack hosted the Messenger Stakes, the second leg of the Triple Crown of Harness Racing for Pacers. Rosecroft hosted the Potomac Stakes, Maryland most successful harness race, from 1990 to 1992. Rosecroft features the Maryland Sire Stakes, which showcases the best standardbred horses in Maryland. Besides the races, Rosecroft has had famous people and horses work and race at the track. John Wagner, Maryland's all-time most winning driver, has been working at Rosecroft since 1974. Several famous people—Lyndon B. Johnson, Elizabeth Taylor, and Nancy Pelosi, among others—have visited Rosecroft. Cam's Card Shark raced at Rosecroft in 1994 and challenged the single-season record for most money won in a season by winning over $2 million, and Robust Hanover set a track record while winning the Breeders Crown in 1985.

== History ==
=== Miller family: 1947–1987 ===
Rosecroft Raceway's opening night, May 27, 1949. An estimated 6,000 people were in attendance, and $164,501 was wagered. Also, this picture shows the first version of the grandstand, which would be remodeled twice during its history.

In September 1947, a meeting was held about bringing a harness racetrack to Maryland, specifically Prince George's County, and Rosecroft was chosen to be the site. William E. Miller—a future harness racing Immortal and horse breeder—founded Rosecroft Raceway in 1949. It was the first raceway to be owned by horse owners, horse trainers, and jockeys. Rosecroft was originally the WE Miller Stables and was located next to the Rosecroft Stock Farm, where horses were bred. The racetrack cost $800,000 to construct and was "first class in every respect". The Washington Post estimated a crowd of 12,000 on its opening day of May 26, 1949, but rain cancelled the races. Rosecroft's first night of racing was May 27, 1949 when 6,000 people showed up and $164,501 was wagered. The handle was the second-highest ever recorded for a night trotting track on an opening night.

For years, Rosecroft Raceway held an annual sale of yearling Standardbred horses. It hosted the annual Maryland Sire Stake Races to promote the best of Maryland-bred horses. When Rosecroft opened, it became the political and social center for Prince George's County, Maryland. Each year during the Miller era, several thousand people traveled from across the country to wager on and watch the horses. In 1953, Rosecroft's attendance of 192,585 was the highest among all harness tracks in Maryland. Owners, trainers, and drivers from across the United States moved their farms to Maryland in the 1950s following the opening of Rosecroft, hoping to compete with the best horses.

In 1954, William E. Miller died from a heart attack while driving a horse at Harrington Raceway. After Miller's death, Rosecroft hosted the William E. Miller Memorial race. Over the years, this race attracted several notable horses, including Cam's Card Shark, the 1994 Horse of the Year. John W. Miller, William's son, owned Rosecroft until his death in 1969. In 1961, the owners of Rosecroft resurfaced and regraded the track. Following John, Earle Brown owned the racetrack. John Wager, Maryland's all-time most winning driver, started to work at Rosecroft in 1974. Earle Brown moved to a different position at the racetrack in 1980 and William E. Miller II, William E. Miller's grandson, took over operations.

In 1984, the Hambletonian Society created the Breeders Crown, a traveling series of races to showcase the best 2-year-old and 3-year-old horses throughout North American and Canada. In the inaugural year, Rosecroft was awarded with a race. Rosecroft hosted the 2-Year-Old Pace of the 1985 Breeders Crown, where Robust Hanover won.

=== Mark Vogel: 1987–1990 ===
Rosecroft Raceway pictured with the older grandstand. When Mark Vogel purchased the racetrack, he envisioned a new, $10 million grandstand.

Mark Vogel, a Maryland real estate agent, purchased both Rosecroft and Ocean Downs Racetrack in 1987 for $6 million in cash plus $5.5 million in debt. Rosecroft was awarded another Breeders Crown race in 1988, making it their fifth straight—but final—year of hosting them. Vogel had three main goals when he became owner: to construct a $10 million grandstand, simulcast Rosecroft races at other racetracks throughout Maryland to attract a larger market, and have more racing days. In 1989, Vogel purchased Freestate Raceway. Freestate was sold to a development firm the next year, and Rosecroft was awarded more racing days.

According to The Washington Times writer Rick Snyder, Vogel did not know the horse racing business and made mistakes that negatively affected the industry in Maryland. The year-round racing Rosecroft was awarded lowered the excitement for the locals. Rosecroft was not capable of attracting a new market, and attendance figures declined. He never focused on marketing or daily operations of Rosecroft. Instead, Vogel focused more on his real estate business. As a result, the attendance dropped. Vogel took out money from the betting pools to help his real estate business. Lower betting pools mean smaller payouts for the bettors and less profit for the racetrack owners. Vogel never formed political ties to help pass legislation used to help harness racing, more specially to allow off-track betting and to lower the state tax on betting pools.

Starting in 1990, Rosecroft Raceway hosted the Messenger Stakes, one of the races for the Triple Crown of Harness Racing for Pacers. Rosecroft attracted the Potomac Stakes, Maryland's most successful race, starting in that year. The Potomac Stakes was previously held at Freestate Raceway and generated one-million-dollar-plus handles on several occasions. On a September 1990 night, $1,195,681 was wagered by bettors, becoming the then-largest handle in Rosecroft's history. This record was broken on May 3, 2003 when $1,564,150 was wagered. Vogel was arrested in September 1990 for possession of cocaine, and his company filed for bankruptcy protection.

=== Weisman's Colt Enterprises: 1991–1995 ===
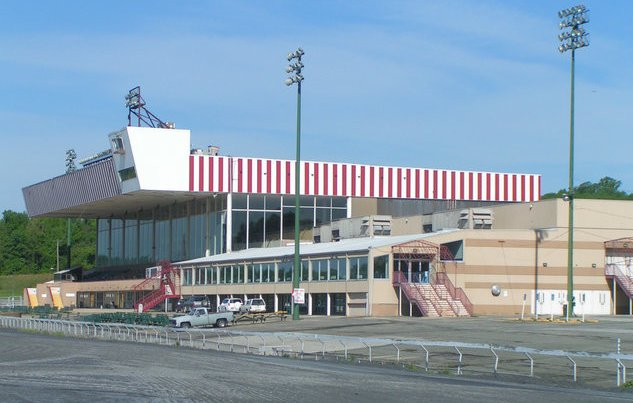
The new grandstand of Rosecroft, completed in 1993, features giant windows. Rosecroft officials reached new simulcasting agreements during the reconstruction. As a result, several big-screen televisions were added throughout.

In 1991, two people were interested in buying the track: Fred Weisman, a California businessman, and former National Football League player Mark May. Weisman out-bid May and purchased Rosecroft out of bankruptcy for $18.2 million. On November 23 of the same year, the grandstand caught fire a few hours before live racing began. In Weisman's first full season of operations, Rosecroft experienced a 10.5 percent increase in handle and an 8.3 percent increase in attendance. In 1992, Western Hanover, the richest horse of that year, won two of the three Triple Crown races, including the Messenger Stakes at Rosecroft. Rosecroft Raceway went into the record books on October 10, 1992, when a three-horse dead heat occurred in the seventh race. It was the 17th time in harness-racing history and the first time in Maryland history.

The new grandstand was completed for $3.6 million in 1993. Since Rosecroft had expanded its simulcasting rights, the new grandstand incorporated large-screen televisions and betting windows. For the 1993 season, Rosecroft's officials decided to stop hosting the five stake races—The Potomac, the Lady Baltimore, The Terrapan, The Turtle Dove, and The North American—inherited when Freestate Raceway closed. The handle was decreasing, and the officials could not afford the purses for the races. To help increase the handle, Maryland racetrack officials voted to allow inter-track simulcasting between all Maryland tracks and authorized off-track betting parlors throughout the state.

In September 1994, Weisman died from pancreatic cancer in Los Angeles, and his relatives took over the racetrack. Although attendance and handle were increasing, the owners were losing money. Reports by independent auditors stated Rosecroft and Ocean Downs combined to lose $1.1 million in fiscal year (FY) 1992, $1.4 million in FY 1993, and $6.2 million in FY 1994. According to Rosecroft's racing official Allan Levey, Weisman's relatives did not want to operate the track and their only goal was to sell it. For the 1995 season, Rosecroft could not afford the payment to host five stake races—including the Messenger Stakes—and dropped them from the racing schedule.

=== Cloverleaf Enterprises: 1995–2010 ===
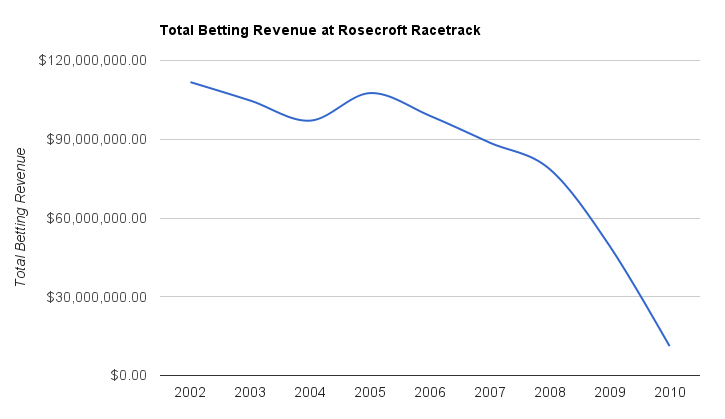
A chart showing the betting revenue at Rosecroft from 2002 to 2010, which decreased 90% during this period. Also, attendance decreased by 95% from 2002 to 2010.

Throughout 1995, Rosecroft was forced to cut costs. Its owners lowered the amount of purse money, eliminated stake races, and reduced the number of racing days. They decided to sell both Rosecroft and Ocean Downs to Cloverleaf Enterprises, a horseman's organization, in mid-1995 for $11 million. Weisman's Colt Enterprises reported that if the racetrack could not be sold, the company would have to file for bankruptcy. Cloverleaf accepted a $10.6 million loan from Bally Entertainment in hopes that a casino would be allowed at Rosecroft.

In 1994, the Delaware General Assembly approved slot machines for the state's three racetracks, and the first racino opened in December 1995. This helped the horse racing industry in Delaware, as approximately 10 percent of all gross revenue is used to increase the purses. This drew competition away from Maryland. Rosecroft could not fill up a 12-race card for its opening night during the 1996 season. An estimated $80 million in wagering was lost in 1996 from the effect of Delaware's casinos. Throughout the years, various politicians tried to bring slot machines or table games to Rosecroft, but all were unsuccessful.

In the 2000s, Cloverleaf tried to sell Rosecroft multiple times. In mid-2002, several buyers became interested in the track, but Cloverleaf was involved in lawsuits, so the track could not be sold. One bidder was Peter Angelos, the owner of the Baltimore Orioles, but he withdrew in 2005. All the lawsuits were resolved in 2006, and only one remaining bidder was left—Penn National Gaming. Maryland passed a casino bill in 2007, but Rosecroft was not one of the locations sanctioned for expanded gambling by the law. As a result, Penn National lost its interest in Rosecroft and decided not to purchase the track. From the gambling revenue, 7 percent goes to the horse-racing industry.

Cloverleaf announced Rosecroft would close on July 1, 2010. Live racing ended in 2009, and the track only had simulcasts as revenue from off-track betting. After several of the surrounding states legalized casinos, Rosecroft was unable to continue as a successful business. Cloverleaf Enterprises filed for Chapter 11 bankruptcy in June 2009. Mark Vogel loaned the track $350,000 and offered to buy the track, but a bankruptcy court judge refused to approve the plan. Rosecroft officials had hoped that the Maryland General Assembly would approve legislation allowing casino-style gambling at Rosecroft, but that did not occur. In early June 2010, Cloverleaf filed for Chapter 7 bankruptcy.

=== Penn National Gaming: 2011–2016 ===
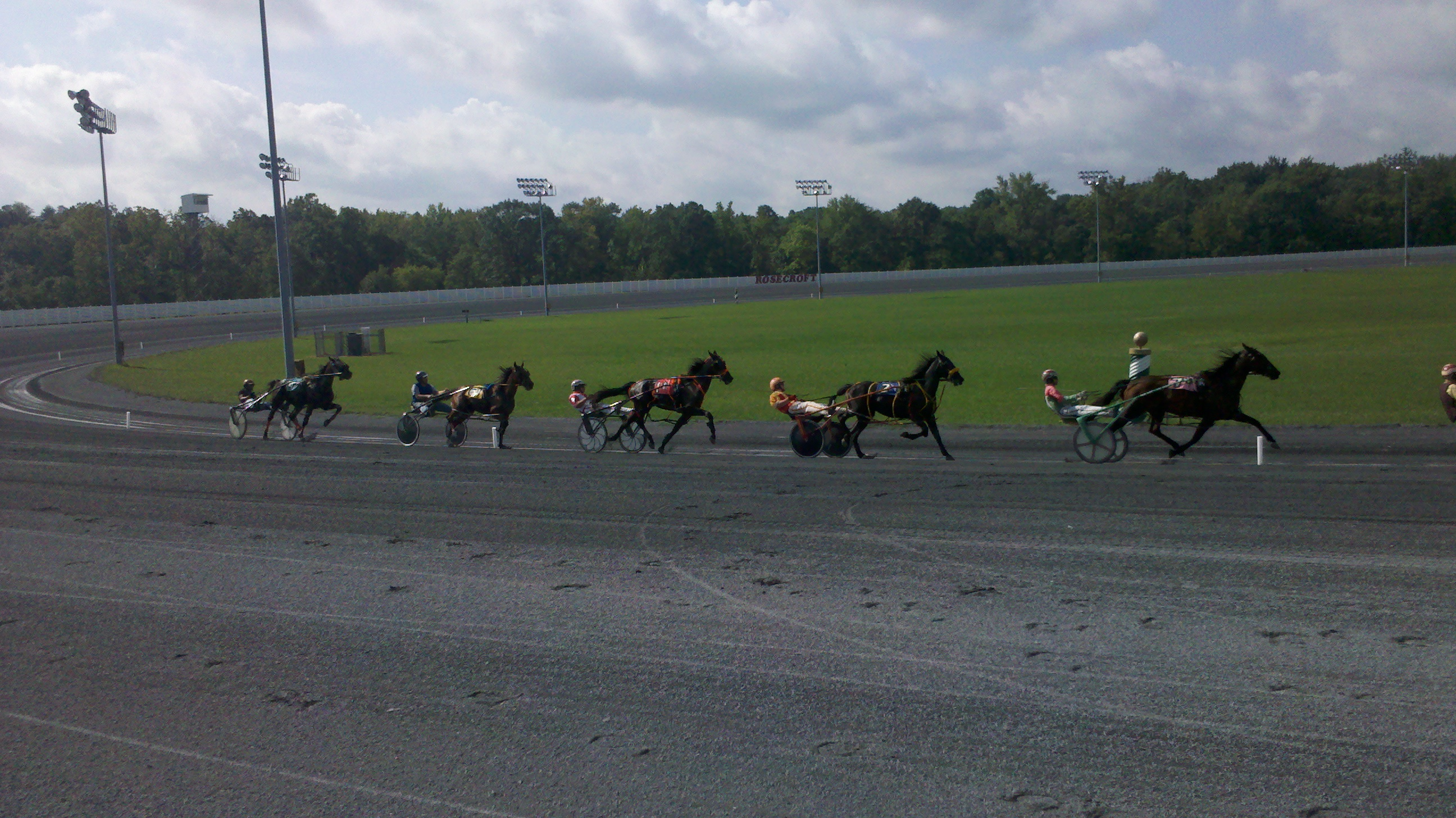
Horses racing at Rosecroft in 2012. This picture is from Rosecroft's first qualifying race of 2012.

In January 2011, Penn National Gaming bought Rosecroft for $10.25 million. Penn National said it planned to return live racing and simulcast wagering to the track as well as pushing for changes in Maryland gaming laws allowing slots and table games. Penn National said it was hoping to convince the state to allow slot machines at the track, even though voters did not approve Prince George's County as a gambling location. On July 28, 2011, the Maryland Racing Commission agreed to allow Penn National Gaming to secure a $1.4 million line of credit to cover operating losses at Rosecroft for fiscal years 2011 and 2012. Penn National said it was likely to incur $2.3 million in losses through 2013.

Penn National wanted Rosecroft to begin simulcasting races in late August 2011. Disputes between tracks and simulcasters about revenues, however, led to a delay in reaching new agreements on broadcast rights. In the 2011, the Maryland legislature passed a bill that required all parties to enter into mediation. If mediation was not successful by October 1, 2011, then an arbitrator was required to help. To resolve a conflict of interest, Penn National sold its financial stake in the Maryland Jockey Club's in July 2011. In August 2011, Rosecroft made public its plans for adding a casino at Rosecroft. It planned to destroy the grandstand and build a casino with approximately 4,700 slot machines alongside the track.

An agreement on simulcasting of harness and quarter horse races was reached in August allowing Rosecroft to reopen on August 25, 2011. Rosecroft owed $1.24 million in unpaid disbursements under its previous simulcast license, and the parties were negotiating about how much of this debt Penn National would pay. Rosecroft drew 400 to 500 patrons on its opening day. Penn National also announced its intent to spend $1 million in the coming year to renovate the property, which would include razing old horse barns, putting a new roof on the betting parlors, and upgrading the HVAC system.

A bill was introduced into the Maryland General Assembly in 2012 which would allow a casino in Prince George's County. The two likely spots were National Harbor or Rosecroft. The bill passed the Senate, but the House did not vote on it. The bill was passed and signed by the Governor in August 2012 to allow a casino in Prince George's County, which was passed via referendum in November 2012. After one season of live racing, Penn National and Cloverleaf reached an agreement to extend live racing at Rosecroft for the next two years. The only exception is if National Harbor becomes the location for the Prince George's County casino.

=== Stronach Group: 2016-present ===
In May 2016, the Stronach Group purchased Rosecroft Raceway for an undisclosed sum. The purchase closed on August 2, 2016. Stronach Group said it would make some cosmetic improvements to the racing facilities, and then begin an evaluation to see what long-term improvements it might make.

== Non-horse racing activities ==
Besides horse racing, Rosecroft has allowed other activities. The Old School Boxing Gym is located there, and the track has hosted amateur boxing matches for several years. The gym served as a refuge to children in the area. Before his heavyweight championship tenure, George Foreman beat Sylvester Dullaire at Rosecroft on July 14, 1969. Then-undefeated boxer Seth Mitchell also fought at Rosecroft in 2009. Rosecroft made news when it decided to host an all-female night of boxing in 2009. In 1974, Rosecroft Raceway hosted professional motorcycle races. In 2012, Rosecroft hosted the 46th Annual Cherry Blossom Rugby Tournament. The area also serves large banquets. Other community activities include an annual Senior Citizen Day, hosting flea markets, fundraising for politicians, and hosting Governor's Day.

== Construction ==
Rosecroft was built in 1949 on 125 acres (51 ha). There are 2,500 parking spaces including main parking by the main entrance. It is nicknamed the "Raceway by the Beltway" for being close to Interstate 495. The track is 5/8-mile long and has a 700-foot home stretch. The current grandstand has been there since 1993. It is 53,000 square feet and is beside the 96,000 square foot, 3-story club house. Inside the club house is the terrace dining room, which holds up to 1,100 people. Each table in the dining room has its own television, which can be used to watch horse racing—either from Rosecroft or other tracks around the world.

== Prominent visitors ==
- Thomas D'Alesandro, former member of the United States House of Representatives
- Zsa Zsa Gabor, Hungarian actress
- George Foreman, retired champion boxer
- Parris Glendening, former Governor of Maryland
- Lyndon B. Johnson, former president of the United States
- Nancy Pelosi, former Speaker of the United States House of Representatives
- Jennings Randolph, former United States Senator
- Elizabeth Taylor, British actress

== Track records ==
Pacers
Age	Type	Name	Date	Time
2-Year-Old	Colt	Falcon's Icon	September 29, 1998	1:52.0
2-Year-Old	Gelding	Shimmering Joseph	July 22, 2000	1:54.0
2-Year-Old	Filly	Cambelle's Up; Rose Drive	July 16, 1994; September 3, 1999	1:54.1
3-Year-Old	Colt	Shady Breeze	October 9, 2012	1:50.0
3-Year-Old	Gelding	Sheer Brilliance	June 7, 2008	1:50.3
3-Year-Old	Filly	The Queen of Trash	July 22, 2006	1:51.1
3-Year-Old	Horse	Jenna's Beach Boy	September 31, 1996	1:49.2
4-Year-Old	Gelding	Bring in the Noise	July 18, 2006	1:50.1
4-Year-Old	Mare	Blueridge Mosaic	June 17, 2006	1:51.2
4-Year-Old	Horse	Nuclear Breeze	July 9, 2007	1:48.2
Aged	Gelding	Real Art	August 28, 2007	1:50.1
Aged	Mare	Kellytuck Sophie	April 23, 2007	1:51.2

Stallion
All Bets Off
November 22, 2016
1:48.2

Trotters
Age	Type	Name	Date	Time
2-Year-Old	Colt	Muscles Rule	July 21, 2007	1:58.2
2-Year-Old	Gelding	Shadow	August 4, 2000	1:58.0
2-Year-Old	Mare	CR Kay Suzie	September 9, 1994	1:56.1
3-Year-Old	Colt	GooGoo GaaGaa	October 27, 2012	1:54.1
3-Year-Old	Gelding	Lolique	July 17, 2006	1:54.1
3-Year-Old	Mare	Guienne Hanover	August 4, 2007	1:55.3
3-Year-Old	Horse	Four Starz Robro	June 19, 2006	1:55.1
4-Year-Old	Gelding	Vivid Photo	June 6, 2006	1:54.0
4-Year-Old	Mare	Wind Glider	June 18, 2003	1:55.2
4-Year-Old	Horse	Duke's Ranger	June 24, 2004	1:54.2
Aged	Gelding	Mr. Performer	June 12, 2006	1:54.3
Aged	Mare	City Press; Photo of a Lady; Khifra Hanover	September 3, 1997; July 30, 2003; November 27, 2007	1:55.4
