= Historical horse racing =

Electronic gambling device

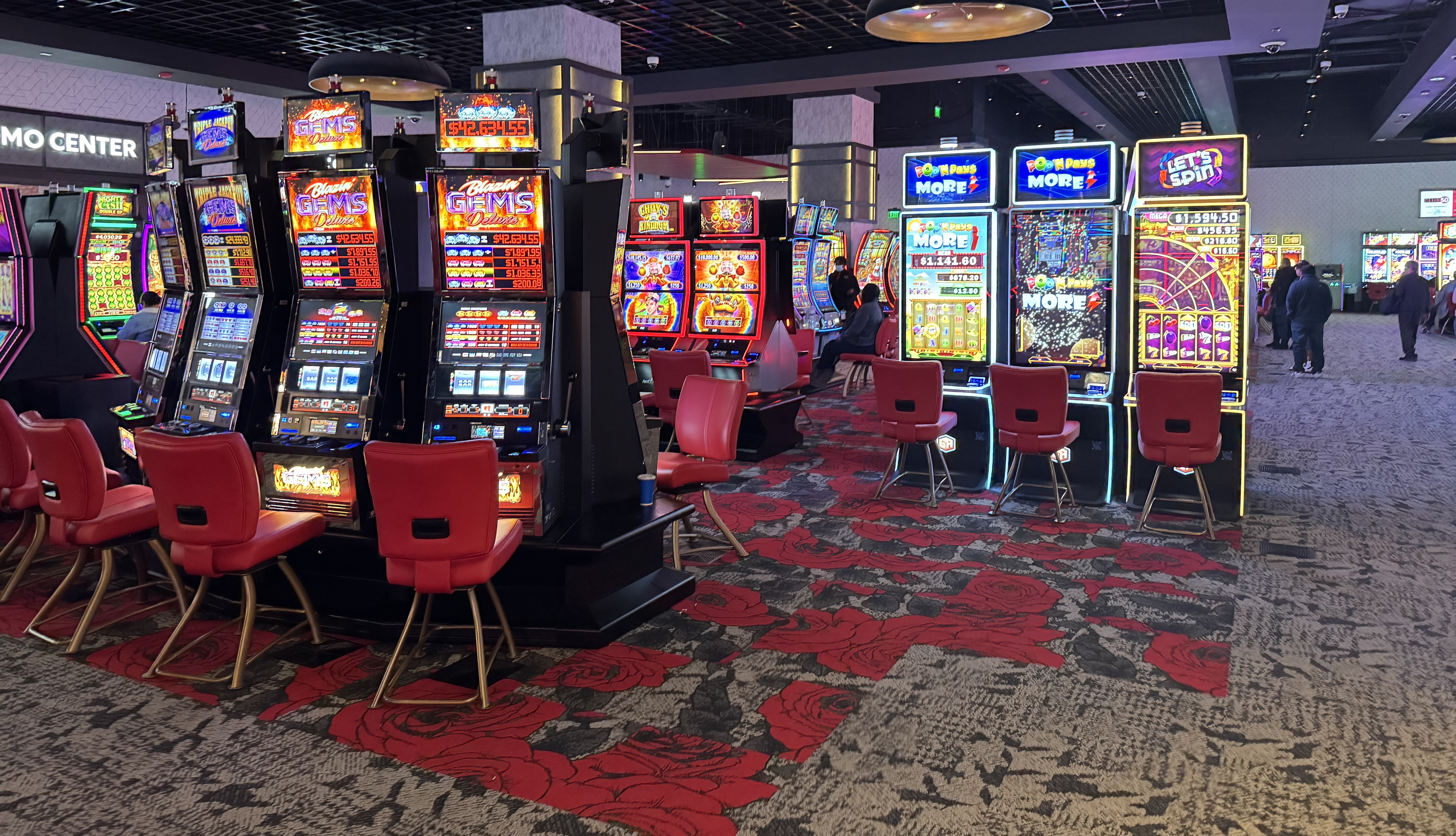
Historical horse racing machines at The Rose Gaming Resort in Virginia, which resemble traditional slot machines.

Historical horse racing (HHR), also known as Instant Racing, is a type of electronic gambling machine. HHR machines allow players to wager on replays of horse races or dog races that have already been run, paid out using the parimutuel betting system.

Initially, most HHR machines resembled self-serve wagering terminals, with players provided with odds, statistics, and handicapping information regarding a randomly-selected race, but with identifying information removed. After placing a wager, video or an animated re-creation of the race results were shown. The majority of current HHR machines are nearly identical to slot machines in appearance and operation, with the reels used as an entertainment display to correspond with the results and payout (not unlike "Class II" games found at tribal casinos), "auto-cap" functions offered for players to automatically divide a wager between the horses, and the race itself heavily downplayed within the user interface.

HHR machines were first introduced in 2000 in the state of Arkansas, with the concept having since been extended to several other U.S. states, and expanded outside the U.S. for the first time in 2024. These games are typically employed in jurisdictions that allow parimutuel betting, but do not allow traditional slot machines based on random number generators. A portion of the games' revenue is typically directed to racing purses, which has been credited with revitalizing the declining sport of horse racing in some markets.

In some jurisdictions, historical horse racing has faced resistance from state legislatures as a novel type of gaming not fully covered under existing law, and disputes over whether modern HHR machines' abstraction of betting functionality away from the player makes them imperceptible from slot machines for regulatory reasons. Some Native American tribes have argued that HHR infringed on their rights to offer tribal gaming.

== Gameplay ==
In the earliest incarnations of Instant Racing machines, gameplay begins when a player deposits their wager, and a race is randomly selected from a video library of over 60,000 previous races. Identifying information such as the location and date of the race, and the names of the horses and jockeys, is not shown. The player is able to view "Skill Graph" charts from the Daily Racing Form, showing information such as the jockeys' and trainers' winning percentages. Based on this handicapping information, the player picks the projected order of finish. Most players use the "handi helper", or "auto-cap" feature, which allows the machine to automatically make the selections on the player's behalf.

Although betting is a single-player process (and not pari-mutuel because "a person who successfully chooses a winning horse never shares a mutuel pool with other bettors simply because there is no one else betting on the same race"), payouts are based on traditional pari-mutuel processes. The player's wager is divvied up into several "betting pools" for different winning possibilities, such as picking the winner of the race, picking the top three finishers in exact order, or any of the three selections finishing first and second. The machine then shows a replay of all or a portion of the race. If the player achieved a particular type of "win", they receive the money from that pool, while the money in each of the other pools continues to accumulate until another bettor wins it.

Early versions of HHR terminals closely resembled self-serve wagering terminals. Later terminals began to mimic slot machines, with symbols on spinning reels corresponding to the results of the player's wager, and the video of the race occupying only a small portion of the display. Some versions show a computer-animated re-enactment of the race rather than a video.

The primary providers of historical racing systems are Exacta Systems (a subsidiary of Churchill Downs), PariMax (a subsidiary of Stronach Group), and Ainsworth Gaming Technology. As the HHR market grew, these companies later entered into partnerships with casino gaming vendors such as Aristocrat, IGT, Incredible Technologies, Konami, and Scientific Games to support their slot titles on HHR systems. Ainsworth leveraged experience in Class II gaming (which uses a similar loophole, except with bingo) from a prior acquisition as part of its expansion into HHR.

== History ==
The idea of historical race wagering was conceived by Eric Jackson, general manager of Oaklawn Park. He brought the idea to three major companies in January 1997, but found no takers. Later in the year, he met with Ted Mudge, president of AmTote, who liked the idea and asked Jackson to present it to experts at a February 1998 racing industry gathering in Maryland. The project gathered momentum from there.

The Arkansas General Assembly took steps in 1999 to authorize Instant Racing by removing the requirement that simulcast races be shown live. A test deployment was launched in January 2000 at Oaklawn Park and Southland Greyhound Park, with 50 machines at each track. The machines proved popular and Jackson reported that as many as a dozen other tracks were pursuing approval to install the machines within two months of the test.

== By region ==
=== United States ===
==== Alabama ====
Historical horse racing machines are in operation at three former greyhound racing tracks in Alabama, Birmingham Race Course Casino, Greene County Entertainment, and Victoryland.

The state attorney general opined in 2001 and 2008 that HHR machines could be legal under existing parimutuel wagering laws. HHR machines were first installed in 2019 at Birmingham Race Course. They came into broader use after unfavorable court rulings forced the removal of electronic bingo machines at some facilities, arriving in 2022 at the Greene County track, and then in 2023 at Victoryland.

==== California ====
There were lobbying efforts in the 2010s to allow California's horse racing facilities to begin offering HHR, as their lack of supplemental revenue opportunities such as HHR or casino gaming had impacted the tracks' ability to offer purses comparable to those of eastern states such as Kentucky and New York. Under California law, Native American tribes hold exclusive rights to conduct most gambling in the state, including the operation of slot machines, outside of lotteries and parimutuel betting.

The California Horse Racing Board had been in discussion with industry, state, and tribal officials to try and establish whether HHR was compliant with California laws regarding parimutuel betting. A representative of the California Nations Indian Gaming Association criticized HHR as being an infringement on the tribes' exclusive rights to operate slot machines, arguing that the differences between HHR and traditional slot machines were "imperceptible" to players. Among the proposals discussed were the possibility of a revenue sharing agreement with the tribes.

With no clear agreement as of 2025 on whether the machines were legal, Santa Anita Park quietly added 26 PariMax machines—branded as "Racing On Demand"—in January 2026. The machines allowed players to place "3×3" wagers (parlays of three trifectas) on historic races conducted outside of the state, with manual and quick pick options. The format had been approved for live bets at the track in 2024, but discussions on their legality for historic races had been inconclusive. Soon after the installation, the machines were seized with no prior warning by the California Department of Justice in cooperation with Arcadia police. Santa Anita Park subsequently sued the DoJ to seek the return of the machines and their cash, arguing that the seizure was conducted without a warrant or legal basis. The Attorney General's Office stated that it had not "consented or acquiesced to the legality of machines that offered 3×3 wagers on concluded horse races".

==== Idaho ====
The Idaho Legislature legalized Instant Racing in 2013, and machines were soon installed at Les Bois Park, Greyhound Park, and the Double Down Bar & Grill in Idaho Falls. State legislators then enacted a ban on the machines in early 2015, claiming they had been misled about the game's nature, but the ban was vetoed by Governor Butch Otter. However, the Coeur d'Alene Tribe, which operates a casino that competes with the racetracks, successfully sued to invalidate Otter's veto, and the ban went into effect in September 2015, resulting in the shutdown of the state's historical racing parlors. A ballot initiative to re-legalize the machines, Proposition 1, was rejected by voters in 2018.

==== Kansas ====
Kansas legislators enacted a historical racing law in 2022, authorizing one license for a facility in the Wichita area with up to 1,000 machines. The license was granted to the proposed Golden Circle project, to open at the former Wichita Greyhound Park in Park City in 2025.

==== Kentucky ====
The Kentucky Horse Racing Commission modified its definition of parimutuel wagering in July 2010 to allow Instant Racing, and at the same time asked a court to review whether the change was legal. The court approved the changes and anti-gambling activists appealed the decision. The anti-gambling activists' appeal reached the Kentucky Supreme Court, which ruled in February 2014 that the Horse Racing Commission could authorize parimutuel wagering on historical races, but remanded the case for further proceedings to determine whether the terminals meet the definition of parimutuel wagering. In 2020, the Supreme Court finally ruled that at least the Exacta Systems product was not parimutuel. The next year, however, state legislators updated the definition of parimutuel wagering to explicitly allow historical horse racing, citing its importance to the state's racing industry.

Even while the legal fight unfolded, Kentucky Downs launched Instant Racing terminals in September 2011, Ellis Park followed suit a year later, and the Red Mile opened a historical racing parlor in partnership with Keeneland in September 2015. Derby City Gaming, a standalone historical racing parlor, opened in 2018. As of 2021, development was underway on a historical racing parlor at Turfway Park and on a second Derby City Gaming location.

==== Louisiana ====
In 2021, Louisiana lawmakers authorized historical racing at off-track betting parlors, with up to 50 machines per location.

The machines were shut down when they were declared unconstitutional by a judge in Baton Rouge in March 2024. Nineteenth Judicial District Court Judge Chip Moore III ruled historical horse racing was a new form of gambling, and under the state constitution, the Louisiana State Legislature could not authorize it without the approval of voters in the parish(es) where the machines were located. The Louisiana Supreme Court upheld the district court's ruling in March 2025, keeping the machines inoperable.

==== Minnesota ====
In April 2024, the Minnesota Racing Commission voted to authorize the installation of 500 HHR terminals each at Canterbury Park and the Running Aces Casino & Racetrack. The decision proved controversial; the Shakopee Mdewakanton Sioux Community among other Indian tribes believed that the decision overstepped the MRC's authority, and infringed upon their compact to operate tribal casinos in the state. Soon afterward, the Minnesota legislature quickly tabled and passed legislation to explicitly ban HHR.

==== Nebraska ====
Nebraska has seen several attempts to legalize the machines. The Nebraska Legislature voted to authorize the machines in 2012, but the bill was vetoed by Governor Dave Heineman. The legislature then approved a state constitutional amendment in 2014 to allow historical racing, but it was struck from the ballot by the Nebraska Supreme Court based on a technicality. The state racing commission attempted in 2018 to approve the machines, but backed off after Attorney General Doug Peterson argued that the move was unconstitutional.

==== New Hampshire ====
In 2021, New Hampshire legalized historic horse racing machines at charitable gaming facilities. By 2023, machines were up and running at eight locations. The largest operation in the state, The Brook, has 505 machines and accounts for 41% of the state's HHR revenue.

==== Oregon ====
The Oregon Racing Commission approved HHR at the state's racetracks in April 2003. Twenty units were installed at Multnomah Greyhound Park the next month. The terminals were moved to Portland Meadows in October. They were removed in November 2003 at the direction of the tracks' parent company, Magna Entertainment. The Commission in 2006 approved a request from Magna to bring the game back to Portland Meadows, but then reversed itself a year later under pressure from Attorney General Hardy Myers, who believed the machines to be illegal.

The state enacted a new law legalizing HHR in June 2013, and games were relaunched at Portland Meadows in February 2015. Portland Meadows closed in 2019.

Another horse track, Grants Pass Downs, sought to open a historical racing parlor with 225 machines. In February 2022, their application was denied by the Oregon Department of Justice; it ruled that because they did not offer enough information to the player about a specific race in order to afford them a "meaningful opportunity to exercise skill" via parimutuel betting, the proposed machines constituted a game of chance and therefore violated state laws prohibiting private casinos with more than 75 slot machines.

==== Texas ====
The Texas Racing Commission adopted rules in August 2014 to allow historical wagering at the state's horse and dog tracks. However, in November 2014, a judge struck down the new rules, finding that historical wagering was a new type of wagering not authorized by existing statutes. The decision was appealed, but the Commission, under strong pressure from state legislators, repealed the historical wagering rules before the appeal could be decided.

==== Virginia ====
Virginia enacted a law to allow historical wagering in April 2018, in an effort to make it economically viable to reopen the state's only horse track, Colonial Downs. The racetrack's historical racing parlor opened in April 2019, with additional machines to follow at several off-track betting parlors around the state, branded as Rosie's Gaming Emporium.

==== Wyoming ====
Historical horse racing is offered at off-track betting (OTB) parlors owned by the state's 3 active racetracks. As of 2023, there were a total of 2,486 HHR machines operating at 43 parlors, with an annual handle of $1.7 billion.

HHR machines were first installed at Wyoming's four OTB parlors beginning in July 2003, after approval by the Wyoming Pari-Mutuel Commission. The machines' legality was soon called into question by the state Attorney General, and they were removed in 2005 following a court ruling. The Wyoming Supreme Court ultimately ruled them illegal in 2006, calling the game "a slot machine that attempts to mimic traditional pari-mutuel wagering". In 2013, the state legislature re-legalized HHR. By December 2016, machines were in operation at 14 betting parlors across the state. The game has been credited with reviving the state's horse racing industry, which grew from zero live races in 2010 to 467 races in 2023.

=== Malta ===
In 2024, Churchill Downs, Exacta, and IGT partnered with the Malta National Lottery to install HHR machines, with its first facility being Izibingo, a bingo parlor in St. Paul's Bay operated by the Malta National Lottery. It was the first expansion of the game beyond the United States.
