= Neil Bluhm =

Businessperson

Neil G. Bluhm
- Born: 1938 (age 87–88); Chicago, Illinois, US
- Education: University of Illinois (B.A.); Northwestern University (J.D.)
- Occupation: Businessman
- Known for: Commercial real estate, casinos
- Spouse(s): Kimberly Paige Bluhm (m. 2022), Barbara Bluhm-Kaul (divorced)
- Children: 3

Neil Gary Bluhm (born 1938) is an American billionaire real estate and casino magnate. He is a partner of Midwest Gaming & Entertainment, which owns several casinos. He had an estimated net worth of US$9.3 billion in July 2026.

== Early life ==
Bluhm was born to a Jewish family in 1938 in Chicago. His father left the family when he was 13, and his mother worked as a bookkeeper. He grew up in a cramped apartment near his immigrant grandparents. He attended a high school on Chicago's northwest side.

He graduated from the University of Illinois at Urbana-Champaign in 1959, studying accounting, and in 1962, he received a juris doctor degree from Northwestern University. In 2009, he received Northwestern's Alumni Medal, the highest honor an alumnus can receive from the university.

== Career ==
He started his career as a lawyer and eventually a partner in the Chicago law firm of Mayer, Brown & Platt. In 1969, he co-founded JMB Realty with Judd Malkin, his high school friend and college roommate.

In 1994, he co-founded Walton Street Capital, a private equity firm. Soon thereafter, with Greg Carlin, he co-founded Rush Street Gaming.

Bluhm and his children own real estate in Chicago and elsewhere, including 900 North Michigan, Four Seasons Hotel Chicago and Ritz Carlton Hotel Chicago. The family is a minority owner of the Chicago Bulls and Chicago White Sox.

According to Forbes, he had a net worth of US$9.3 billion in July 2026.

== Personal life ==
He is divorced from art collector and philanthropist Barbara Bluhm-Kaul. They have 3 children: Andy Bluhm, who runs hedge fund Delaware Street Capital; Leslie Bluhm, who co-founded Chicago Cares, and recently served as a Director on the Board of AmeriCorps under the Biden administration, and Meredith Bluhm-Wolf, who helps direct the family's business and charitable foundation. He is currently married to Kimberly Paige Bluhm.

He lives in Chicago. In December 2018, he purchased an apartment near Miami for $20 million.

An art patron, he sits on the board of trustees of the Art Institute of Chicago and the Whitney Museum of American Art. He has an art collection worth over $300 million. He sits on the board of trustees of Northwestern University.

=== Political contributions ===
Bluhm is a Democrat. He hosted President Barack Obama's 49th birthday party, where admission cost a $30,000 donation to the Democratic National Committee. He has contributed to the campaigns of Hillary Clinton, Dick Durbin, Melissa Bean, Rahm Emanuel, Lisa Madigan, Rod Blagojevich, Lou Lang, and Michael Madigan. In 2017, Bluhm was criticized after calling in a request to Rahm Emanuel after making a $300,000 contribution.

=== Philanthropy ===
In 2005, he funded the Bluhm Cardiovascular Institute with a $10 million gift.

In 2013, he made a $25 million gift to Northwestern University, including $15 million earmarked for the Northwestern University Pritzker School of Law.

In 2015, he made a $1 million donation to the School of the Art Institute of Chicago.

In 2022, he made a $45 million donation to Northwestern Medicine to establish the Bluhm Heart Hospital.
