= United Tote =

American gambling equipment and services company

- Type: Subsidiary
- Industry: Bookmaking
- Owner: Churchill Downs, Inc. (51%); New York Racing Association (49%)

United Tote is an American company that provides totalizator equipment and services for parimutuel wagering at racetracks. It is owned by Churchill Downs, Inc. and the New York Racing Association.

== History ==
United Totalizator was founded in the 1950s by Lloyd and Jane Shelhamer. The Shelhamers owned Beaumont Race Track in Belgrade, Montana. They could not find a totalizator company willing to service such a small facility, so they purchased obsolete wagering equipment to operate in-house, and soon branched out to service other racetracks in the region.

In 1980, the company introduced the MicroTote 1000, a computerized tote system designed to be affordable for smaller tracks.

The company changed its name to United Tote in 1984 and made its initial public offering, raising $7 million.

In 1986, United Tote bought Sunland Park Racetrack in New Mexico for $3.5 million. By this time, United Tote had a 10 percent market share in North America, with contracts to service 85 tracks and jai alai frontons, making it the third largest tote company after AmTote and Autotote. It continued to operate out of the Shelhamers' ranch house in Shepherd, Montana.

The company partnered in 1988 with Wembley plc, a British operator of greyhound racing tracks, to form United Track Racing, a joint venture to acquire and operate tracks in the US. United Tote would own 20 percent of the venture and would be responsible for managing the tracks. United Track Racing acquired five greyhound tracks in South Dakota, Rhode Island, and Colorado the next year.

In 1989, United Tote purchased its larger competitor, Autotote Systems, from Thomas H. Lee for $85 million. Before the two companies' operations could be integrated, the merger was challenged by federal antitrust regulators. A 1991 court ruling forced the company to split back up, and the original United Tote business was divested to the Shelhamer family.

The company sold its stake in United Track Racing to Wembley plc in 1992.

In 1994, the Shelhamer family sold United Tote to Video Lottery Technologies, Inc., a Montana-based maker of lottery equipment, for $20 million in cash plus $10 million in promissory notes and an earnout agreement worth up to $10 million. Video Lottery Technologies, later named Powerhouse Technologies, was acquired in 1999 by Anchor Gaming, which was then purchased in 2001 by International Game Technology (IGT). United Tote became part of IGT's newly formed lottery division.

IGT sold United Tote in 2003 for $12.3 million.

In 2006, Youbet.com purchased United Tote for $31.9 million plus $14.7 million in assumed debt.

United Tote became part of Churchill Downs, Inc. in 2010, when that company acquired Youbet.com.

In 2024, Churchill Downs sold a 49 percent stake in the company to the New York Racing Association. The two organizations said they would develop a system under United Tote to expedite the addition of horse racing to sports betting platforms.
