= Derby City Gaming =

Gaming facility in Kentucky, United States

Derby City Gaming officially opened on Friday September 14, 2018. The 85,000 square foot, $65 million-dollar facility is Louisville, Kentucky’s only licensed gaming facility. It includes 1,000 historical racing machines, with over 70 themes, on the 45,000 square foot gaming and entertainment floor. The total project employed over 900 people, with 225 employees now working full time at the location.

== History ==
Derby City Gaming is located at the old Louisville Downs site. Louisville Downs was originally a harness track which closed in 1991. The property featured a trackside training facility for horses and jockeys as well as spectrum betting at an off-track facility which overlooked the track. Louisville Downs was the first track in Kentucky to provide phone wagering and full card simulcast wagering. After its closure the site was bought by Churchill Downs Incorporated and was converted into a winter training facility for thoroughbreds.
