= Chicago Cares =

American non-profit organization

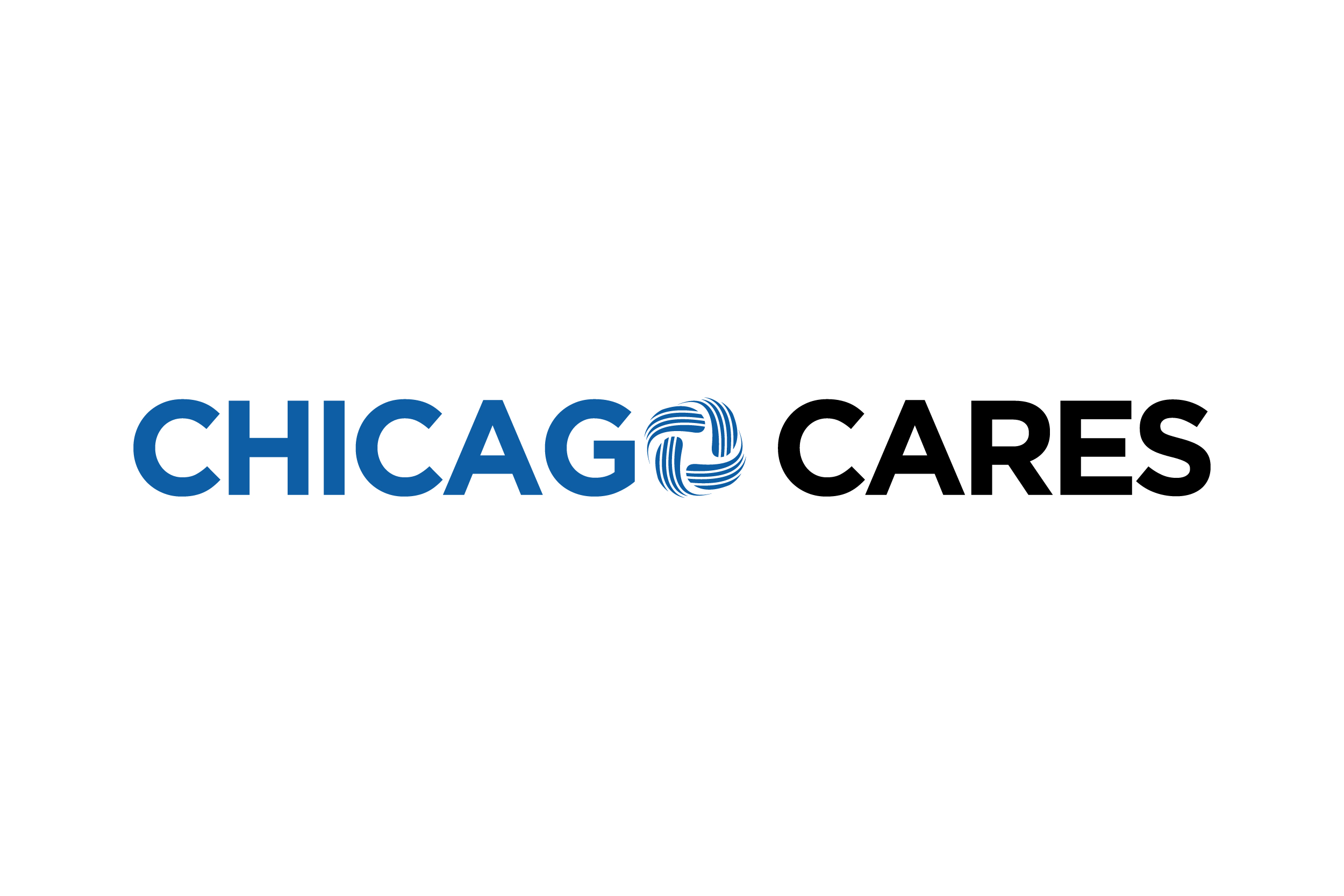
- Chicago Cares logo
- Formation: 1991
- Type: Non-profit
- Legal status: 501(c)(3)
- Region served: Cook County
- CEO: Rosie Drumgoole
- Revenue: $4,143,687 (2021)
- Website: www.chicagocares.org

Chicago Cares is a nonprofit organization that connects prospective volunteers with volunteer opportunities throughout Chicago. It was founded in 1991 by Leslie Bluhm and Mary Prchal. In addition to connecting volunteers to service programs, Chicago Cares offers a training called Power of Service.

== History ==
Chicago Cares was founded in 1991 with the goal of encouraging working professionals to participate in short term volunteering projects that aligned with their work schedules.

Co-founders Leslie Bluhm and Mary Prchal created the organization because of a need to have an outlet to publicize volunteer opportunities. Upon creation, Chicago Cares partnered with nonprofit organizations to place volunteers with organizations. Leslie Bluhm currently serves on the board of directors.

== Impact ==
Since 2017 Chicago Cares has partnered with community-based organizations engaging 17,880 volunteers across 1,822 service projects. Chicago Cares hopes their impact is counted in more than just numbers. Their goal is that "Chicago Cares volunteers become knowledgeable of the assets and challenges facing their neighbors – and as a result, are catalyzed to do more to build a more vibrant and equitable Chicago." Through connecting across lines of difference, building empathy, and inspiring civic action, Chicago Cares volunteers become a part of creating a stronger, more equitable Chicago.

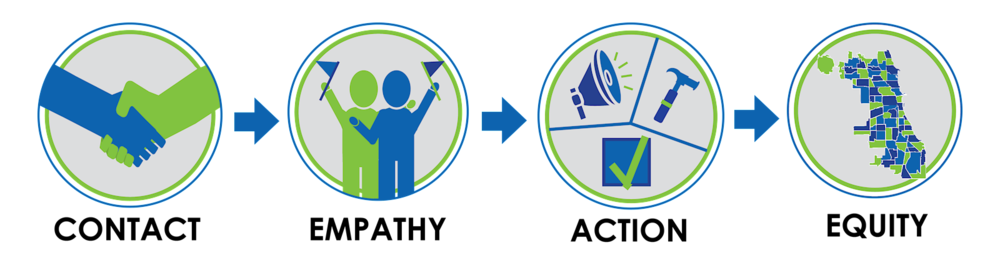
Impact Story Banner from Chicago Cares' website

== Programs ==
=== Volunteering ===
Chicago Cares is redefining volunteerism. "From hands-on projects to virtual service, Chicago Cares' volunteer programs allow Chicagoans to challenge their assumptions about Chicago and build community with neighbors. Our programs are intentionally designed to help you increase your involvement over time, setting you on the path from connection to education to action." Project types include hands-on, skills-based, virtual and referral. These projects fall into three different engagement levels: building connections, deepening knowledge, and championing your cause. Projects also cover a wide range of impact areas including education, health and wellness, housing and homelessness, jobs and economic development, and public safety.

=== Power of Service ===
Power of Service is Chicago Care's new training series. According to Chicago Cares, the power of service "is the journey that volunteers and organizations take that catalyzes connection, action, and investment." They suggest that it is more than any single service project. Using their experience and tools like co-design, Chicago Cares offers this training to individuals who volunteer, non-profits, and companies.
