= Freestate Raceway =

Defunct horse racing facility in Maryland, US

Coordinates: 39°7′44″N 76°49′15″W

- Interactive map of Freestate Raceway
- Owner: Dick Hutchinson (1948–unknown); Dick Hutchingson, Jr. (unknown–1976); Greta, Joseph Shamy (1976–1979); Frank DeFrancis (1980–1989)
- Seating type: Grandstand
- Type: Horse racing
- Event: Standardbred

Construction
- Built: 1948
- Opened: 1948
- Closed: 1990
- Demolished: 1990

Freestate Raceway (originally Laurel Raceway from 1948 to 1979) was a horse racing track in Maryland. It opened in 1948 and closed in 1990.

== History ==
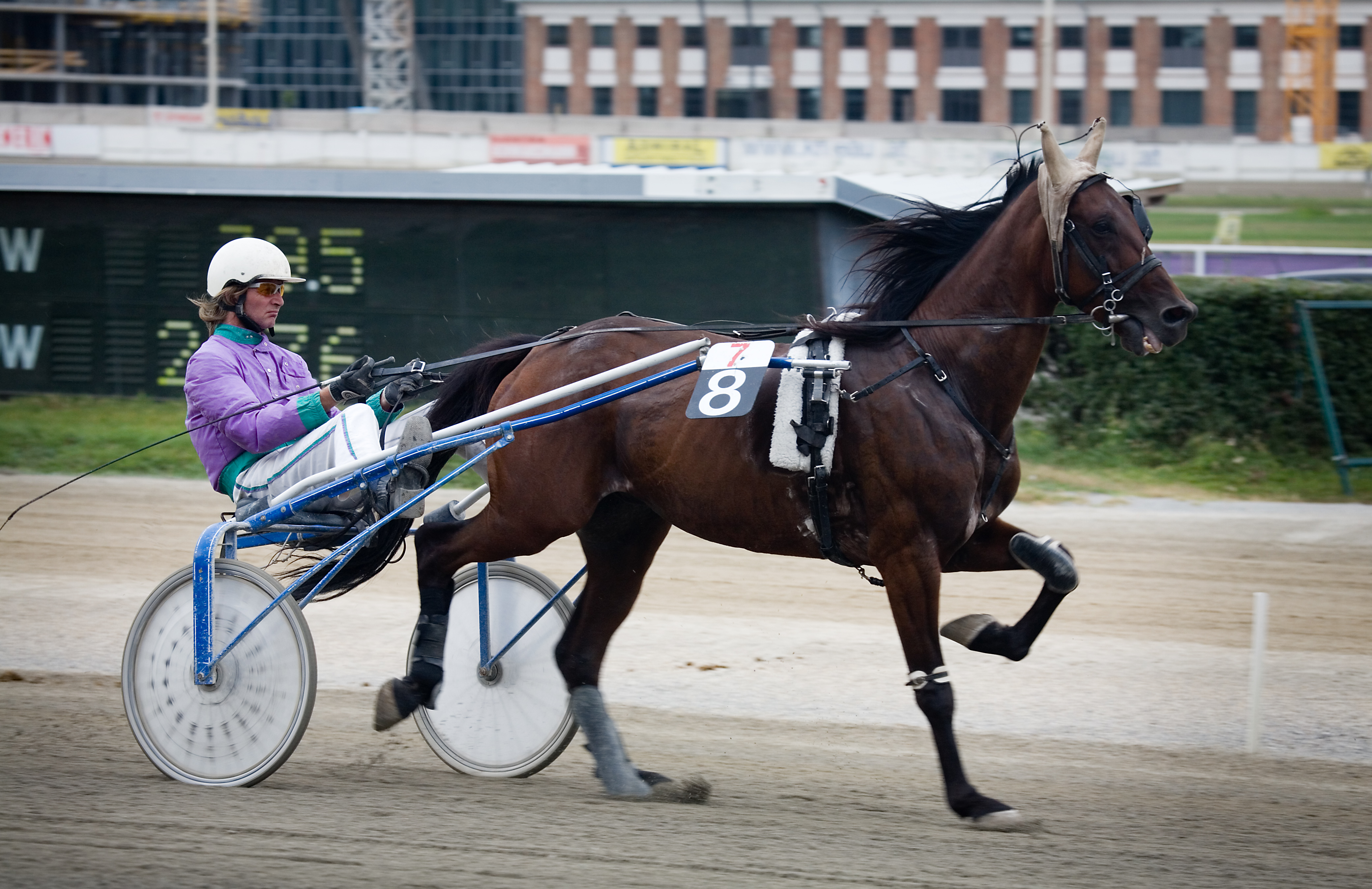
Harness racing

=== Laurel: 1947–1979 ===
In September 1947, a meeting was held about bringing a harness racetrack to Maryland, specifically Prince George's County and Howard County. Rosecroft Raceway was chosen for the Prince George's County license, and Freestate was chosen for the Howard County one. Freestate was originally called Laurel Raceway from its opening to 1979. In 1948, Freestate Raceway began its first horse racing season. It was founded by Dick Hutchinson. Freestate was the first track to allow pari-mutuel wagering on a harness race. According to the United States Trotting Association, the racetrack broke several records in its inaugural season, including opening night attendance (12,000), total mutual handle ($3,703,949), and highest attendance (16,000). The owners hosted the Howard County Fair on the grounds in 1948 and 1949 which allowed an exception in post-war rationing of roofing materials that were restricted for agricultural uses only. The fair featured "The Great Zacchinni" human cannonball act. The owners of Freestate decided to increase the purse money, the number of seats, and several other things to greatly improve the racetrack for the 1949 season.

Operations at the track ended in 1975, followed by a fire that destroyed the clubhouse and grandstand in March 1976. Hutchingson's son, Dick Hutchingson, Jr., sold the racetrack to Greta and Joseph Shamy in April 1976. Later, the Vice President of the track Mike Brown was indicted for arson at the clubhouse. The racetrack was estimated to be in $6 million in debt in 1979, and in the same year, Joseph Shamy was arrested in 1979 for "raiding the track's treasury to pay personal debts." Shamy was convicted of racketeering and embezzling $1.2 million from the track which defaulted on a $4.5 million loan from the National Bank of Washington and payments to riders.

=== Freestate: 1980–1990 ===
The following year Frank DeFrancis purchased the racetrack from National Bank of Washington. The first thing DeFrancis did was change the name to Freestate Raceway. Before Freestates first meet under DeFrancis, he did a lot of work to track, including fixing up the grandstand, creating a driver's lounge, and promoting under the slogan "Where Fun Comes in First". After losing money for the first few years, DeFrancis persuaded the Maryland General Assembly to lower the tax on the track's handle. Starting in 1982, Freestate Raceway began to host the Potomac Stakes, Maryland's most successful race. Each time this race happened, the attendance and handle rose dramatically; in 1984, a record $1,094,054 was wagered on the night of that race. In his first six years of operations, Freestate's average attendance increased from 4,477 to 5,453. In 1988, Roosevelt Raceway, which hosted the Messenger Stakes, closed operations, and the race was given to Freestate for the remainder of Freestate's history. In 1989, DeFrancis died, and Freestate was sold to become an industrial park the following year. The park is a 320,000-square-foot shopping center with a grocery store and an adjacent Carmax dealership.
