= Saratoga Casino Hotel =

Hotel in Saratoga Springs, NY

- Interactive map of Saratoga Casino Hotel
- Location: Saratoga Springs, New York
- Coordinates: 43.061469°N 73.773789°W
- Owned by: Saratoga Harness Racing, Inc.
- Date opened: 1941
- Race type: Standardbred

Saratoga Casino Hotel (formerly Saratoga Casino and Raceway) is an establishment in Saratoga Springs, New York. Saratoga Casino Hotel is home to a 1/2-mile standardbred race track, with a racino and hotel located inside the racetrack's grandstand. Saratoga Casino Hotel is not connected to the historic Saratoga Race Course thoroughbred race track located across the street on Nelson Avenue.

== Facility ==
Saratoga Casino Hotel has three entrances: A primary entrance on Jefferson Street, where the Saratoga Harness Hall of Fame is located, a secondary entrance on Crescent Avenue, and a third entrance on Nelson Avenue, just north of its intersection with Crescent Avenue. The facility is located on the southeastern tip of Saratoga Springs. First opened in 1941 as a harness racing track, the facility was expanded in 2004 to include video lottery gaming terminals, or VLT as they are officially called. Then in 2016, a hotel was constructed on the north end of the property where a training track once existed.

The track is a 1/2-mile oval, where horses do two laps to complete the commonly used 1-mile (1.6 km) distance used in U.S. standardbred races. Because of the landscaping present in the infield and the country feel, the track has been dubbed "The most beautiful 1/2-mile track in the country. For some time, an expansion of the track to a 5/8-mile oval was being discussed, but it never came into fruition, and no further discussion about an expansion to the track's oval has come up in the last 10 years.

Inside, the first floor grandstand has been converted into the casino, with over 1,700 video lottery terminals, or VLT's for short. While the majority of these are slots, there are some poker, roulette, blackjack and keno games present, all in video format. There is a Diamond Jim's bar and two eateries, one a regular fare menu called Lucky Joe's, and the other a buffet restaurant called Garden Buffet. And there's a nightclub called Vapor's, home to live music, DJ remixes and other special events throughout the year. The second floor was renovated prior to the VLT inclusion, but hosts simulcast and live wagering as well as stands for fans to sit and watch the races, and Fortune's Restaurant, a sit-down casual dining facility serves meals during the racing season, typically between March–December. Attached to the Grandstand is the Clubhouse, essentially unchanged over the past 15 years that the facility has undergone massive changes. Open only during live racing, the clubhouse houses one bar and a quick food eatery for patrons watching the races, in addition to the accustomed wagering terminals.

Except for the craps and roulette, where the results are random and not based on previous outcomes, the slot machines are such where each play is dependent on the results of lottery scratch play ticket pre-determined by the centralized computer system—which in this case is the New York Lottery. All machines work on a voucher system, where the patron inserts money or a ticket, and all payouts are given in the form of a printed voucher, which may be inserted into another machine or turned into the cashier cage for payment.

== History ==
Saratoga Casino Hotel has changed names over the past 20 years with the various changes to the facility. The track, originally dubbed Saratoga Raceway, was opened in 1941 as a facility for American harness racing and was the third racetrack to have pari-mutuel wagering. According to the history books, the Saratoga harness racing legend was born when two horses named Lady Suffolk (a.k.a. The Old Gray Mare) and Moscow were set against each other in a staged race in the city of Saratoga Springs.

During the height of racing, thousands of fans would visit to cheer on the horses. The track would offer grand-circuit racing, attracting some of the biggest names of racing at that day to the half-mile facility. The track was notorious in the early 1980s for being where Niatross collapsed and fell on the inner rail on the stretch run home, dealing him his first ever career loss. But the advent of off-track betting and the economy led towards sour times for racing at the Raceway. Not wanting to surrender, the management changed the name of Saratoga Raceway to Saratoga Equine Sports Center in the 1990s, to reflect the plans of bringing in more horse-related activities to the facility. But renewed interest didn't formulate with the name change, and at the worst, track management had to import races from other tracks across New York State in order to offer fill up a nine-race card.

The change for Saratoga Raceway came in 2001 when government officials in New York State approved a bill allowing VLT's to installed at race tracks across the state, pending approval from the local governments which the track resided in. In early 2002, Saratoga County officials approved the installation of the terminals at Saratoga Raceway, which began construction in 2003 with work being done to the ground floor of the grandstand to transform it from a racing facility to the modern day gaming floor. On January 28, 2004, Saratoga Raceway became the first racing facility in New York to open the video lottery games to the public, as thousands of patrons came to usher in the new era at the Raceway.

In reflection of the new video lottery games, the Saratoga Equine Sports Center changed its name in 2004 to Saratoga Gaming and Raceway, which would last until the start of 2011, when the facility changed names once more to Saratoga Casino and Raceway, reflecting the plans to introduce electronic table games to the facility and increase the diversity of gaming options at the racino.

The effects of the racino could immediately be found at the racing side of the facility. Purses started to increase dramatically. Prior to the VLTs, horses running in the highest level, the "Winners over $5,000 Lifetime" condition, was competing for approximately $4,500 in purse money. Today, horses running in the highest level, the "Open Handicap", now compete for approximately $16,000 in purse money. Horses who ran for the lowest class offered, a $2,500 claim, ran for $1,100 in purse money. Today, the lowest condition is offered for $3,200.

The racino measure also allowed Saratoga Casino and Raceway to offer the New York Sire Stakes Night of Champions in 2005 and 2006 while Yonkers Raceway was being renovated to allow for video slots. The two nights gave Saratoga Casino & Raceway the highest single-day purse offerings, with over $1 million up for grabs. The New York Sire Stakes Night of Champions returned to the racino for a third time on October 1, 2011.

Saratoga Casino and Raceway's biggest race of the year is the Joe Gerrity Jr. Pacing Series, which takes place in August. It was a four-leg series until 2013, when management opted to make the race a single "Free For All" pace worth $275,000. The race has brought big-name standardbreds to Saratoga, and has resulted in the fastest times the track has ever seen be recorded, like in 2014 when Dancin Yankee stopped the timer in 1:48:4, a track record that still stands two years later.

In May 2012, the track's parent company, Saratoga Harness Racing, agreed to buy Fitzgeralds Casino in Black Hawk, Colorado for $28 million. The sale closed in January 2013, with plans to spend $40 million on expansion and rename the property as Saratoga Casino Black Hawk. The company also acquired a minority stake in Ellis Park Race Course in Kentucky in 2012, and then acquired full ownership of the track in 2018.

In 2015, construction of a brand new hotel began on the facility's north side, where a training track once resided. The hotel opened in July 2016, bringing the management to change the name to the current name of Saratoga Casino Hotel.

Starting in February 2019, Saratoga Casino began an $8 million upgrade to include new features and amenities such as an Outdoor Gaming Terrace, a Sports Bar, and a VIP Lounge.

== Famous horses ==
Bret Hanover – won the 1965 Battle of Saratoga pace

Niatross – lost for the first time in his career when he fell over the hubrail in the stretch and did not finish – July 5, 1980. Trenton Time went on to win the race in 1:59.3. Niatross was uninjured and raced the following week.

Mack Lobell – won the Breeders Crown for aged trotting horses in a track record setting time of 1:56.0 on August 5, 1988, for driver John Campbell

Nevele Pride – won the 1968 Battle of Saratoga trot for legendary horseman Stanley Dancer

Scenic Regal – Trotting mare who raced often at Saratoga for local horseman Harold Story and went on to earn over $1 million in purses. She was named Trotting Mare of the year 3 years in a row and set a world record for older trotting mares in her 1:58.0 win at Saratoga on August 19, 1987 (still a track record).

Bunny Lake – Millionaire mare and 2001 Horse of the Year was stabled at Saratoga for her trainer, John Stark Jr. Bunny Lake raced at Saratoga several times and held the all-age track record from 2002 to 2006.

Dancin Yankee – Winner of the Joe Gerrity Jr. Memorial Pace in 2014, setting a track and world for aged pacing colts on a half-mile track by stopping the timer in 1:48:4.

== Notable horsemen ==
Dan Cappello Jr. – leading driver at Saratoga for most of the 1990s and 2000s

Kim Crawford – leading driver at Saratoga most of the 1980s

Percy Davis – one of only two people to have been voted Saratoga Race Trainer of the Year four times

Del Miller – raced at Saratoga Raceway in the early years, and is an inductee into the Saratoga Harness Hall of Fame, which resides on the Jefferson Street side of the property.

J.P. Morel – leading driver at Saratoga in much of the 1970s

Bill O'Donnell – moved to Saratoga in 1979 and set the all-time record for most wins (279) at a single track in a single season. O'Donnell soon moved to The Meadowlands and became one of the leading driver in the harness racing.

John Stark Jr. – a top driver and trainer based at Saratoga since the mid-1990s, conditioned Horse of the Year Bunny Lake and many other stakes performers

Harold Story – a longtime fixture who drove and trained from the 1950s through the early 1990s. Story is best remembered as the trainer and driver of 3-time Trotting Mare of the Year and Scenic Regal (1987–1989) who earned over a million dollars for Story. Saratoga has named a Stakes series for younger trotters in Story's honor.

== Amenities ==
The property has 1,700 video lottery games as well as live harness racing during the months of March to December, simulcast at the horse racing center on the mezzanine level. There are multiple food facilities: an atrium-style food court, a snack and hot dog counter in the Lower Clubhouse (open during live racing only), The Garden Buffet, a track-side restaurant "Fortunes", and Jackpot's Deli Counter. There are also 3 bars, and live entertainment at Vapor Night Club including live bands, DJs and national acts.

The casino was also known in Saratoga Springs for its Independence Day fireworks display held annually on July 3. The yearly tradition was discontinued in 2014 when management decided to join forces with the City of Saratoga Springs for their July 4 fireworks extravaganza at nearby Congress Park.
