= Market8 =

Proposed casino in Center City, Philadelphia, Pennsylvania

- Location within Pennsylvania Location within Philadelphia
- Interactive map of Market8
- Location: Philadelphia, Pennsylvania; 8th Street & Market Street, Philadelphia, PA, 19107; 39.9511°N 75.1535°W
- Opened: Never opened, failed to gain regulatory approval
- Casino type: Commercial casino
- Owner: Market East Associates LP

Market8 was a proposed casino project in Center City, Philadelphia, Pennsylvania. The project, which was to build a casino at the intersection of 8th Street and Market Street, failed to gain regulatory approval from the Pennsylvania Gaming Control Board, with the license instead going to Live! Casino & Hotel Philadelphia. The proposal was spearheaded by developer Ken Goldenberg along with financial support from Ira Lubert, who is a minority owner of Rivers Casino and owns 36.4% of Valley Forge Casino Resort, both of which are in Pennsylvania. The project, as well as other casinos vying for the license, faced opposition from local community groups, including those in nearby Chinatown.

== Background ==
In 2013, the Pennsylvania Gaming Control Board (PGCB) announced that another gambling license was available for a casino in the city of Philadelphia as the license previously issued to Foxwoods Casino Philadelphia was revoked when they did not build a casino. Rivers Casino Philadelphia, then known as Sugarhouse Casino, opposed the new license saying it would be detrimental for their business. Six different projects applied for the license to the PGCB. In addition to Market8 and the ultimately successful proposal Live!, the other proposals were by Wynn Resort; Tower Investments, whose casino would be called The Provence; Casino Revolution, run by Joseph Procacci; and Hollywood Casino where the ownership would be split between a public benefit corporation and Penn National Gaming, who own Hollywood Casino at Penn National Race Course, which opened as a casino in 2008.

== Controversy ==
The project stirred up controversy in Philadelphia with a number of anti-gambling groups. A number of participants and groups opposing the casino were from Chinatown. The groups argued that casinos caused a multitude of problems and that adding another casino to the city would make those issues worse. Casinos in Pennsylvania have been noted for targeting some of their gaming and marketing specifically towards Asian customers, with Rivers Casino proposing in 2013 that it would add an "Asian Gaming Center" conditional on the expansion of the casino floor. Protesters against the issuance of a second license for a casino in Philadelphia asserted that casinos cause crime and addiction.

== Fate ==
The PGCB did not elect to give the second license in Philadelphia to Market8, instead awarding to Live! Casino near the South Philadelphia Sports Complex. One of the major factors Live! was chosen over Market8 was that Live! has parking and that the projections for Market8 customers to use public transit to visit the casino were overblown.
