= List of casinos in Pennsylvania =

This is a list of Pennsylvania's 18 casinos:

== List of casinos ==
List of casinos in the U.S. state of Pennsylvania
Casino	Online Casino	City	County	District	Type	Comments
The Casino at Nemacolin	-	Farmington	Fayette		Resort
Happy Valley Casino	-	State College	Centre		Mini-casino
Harrah's Philadelphia	Caesars Casino	Chester	Delaware		Racino	Formerly Harrah's Chester
Hollywood Casino at The Meadows	-	North Strabane Township	Washington		Racino
Hollywood Casino Morgantown	-	Morgantown	Berks		Mini-casino
Hollywood Casino at Penn National Race Course	Hollywood Casino	Grantville	Dauphin		Racino
Hollywood Casino York	-	York	York		Mini-casino	Part of the York Galleria complex
Live! Casino & Hotel Philadelphia	-	Philadelphia	Philadelphia	South	Stand-alone
Live! Casino Pittsburgh	-	Greensburg	Westmoreland		Mini-casino	Part of the Westmoreland Mall complex
Mohegan Pennsylvania	Unibet Casino	Plains Township	Luzerne	Poconos	Racino
Mount Airy Casino Resort	PokerStars Casino	Mount Pocono	Monroe	Poconos	Stand-alone	In partnership with FOX Bet and PockerStars
Parx Casino and Racing	betPARX	Bensalem	Bucks		Racino	Formerly Philadelphia Park Racetrack and Casino
Parx Casino Shippensburg	-	Shippensburg	Cumberland		Mini-casino
Presque Isle Downs & Casino	BetAmerica Casino	Erie	Erie		Racino
Rivers Casino Philadelphia	SugarHouse Casino and BetRivers Casino	Philadelphia	Philadelphia	Riverfront	Stand-alone	Formerly SugarHouse Casino. SugarHouse online casino is still operating but rebranded as BetRivers.
Rivers Casino Pittsburgh	-	Pittsburgh	Allegheny	Chateau	Stand-alone
Valley Forge Casino Resort	FanDuel Casino	King of Prussia	Montgomery		Resort
Wind Creek Bethlehem	Wind Creek Casino	Bethlehem	Northampton	South Side	Stand-alone	Formerly Sands Casino Resort Bethlehem

=== Never opened casinos ===
- Foxwoods Casino Philadelphia, Philadelphia
- Market8, Philadelphia
- Mount Airy Pittsburgh, Big Beaver

== Gallery ==
Harrah's Philadelphia

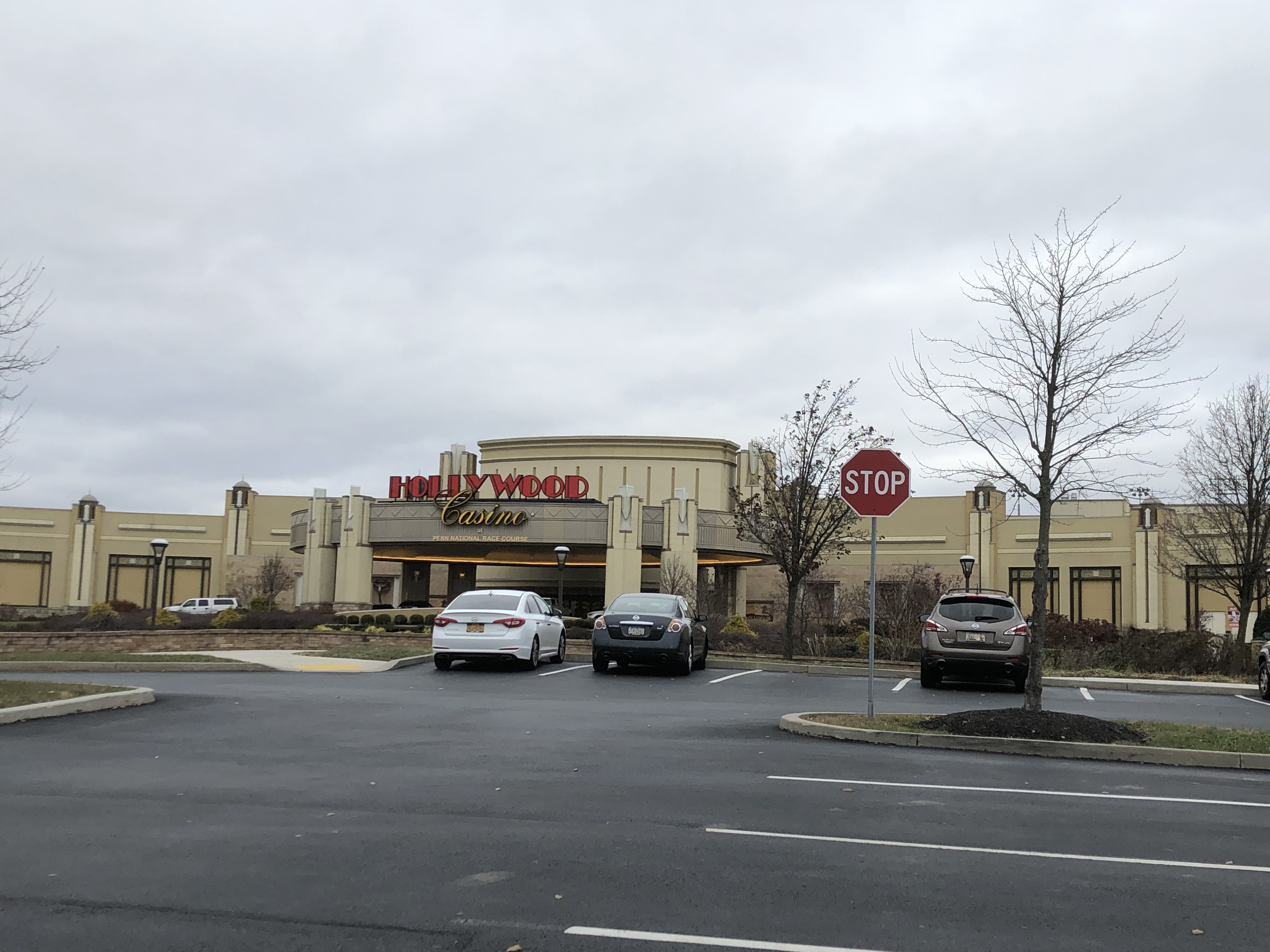
Hollywood Casino at Penn National Race Course

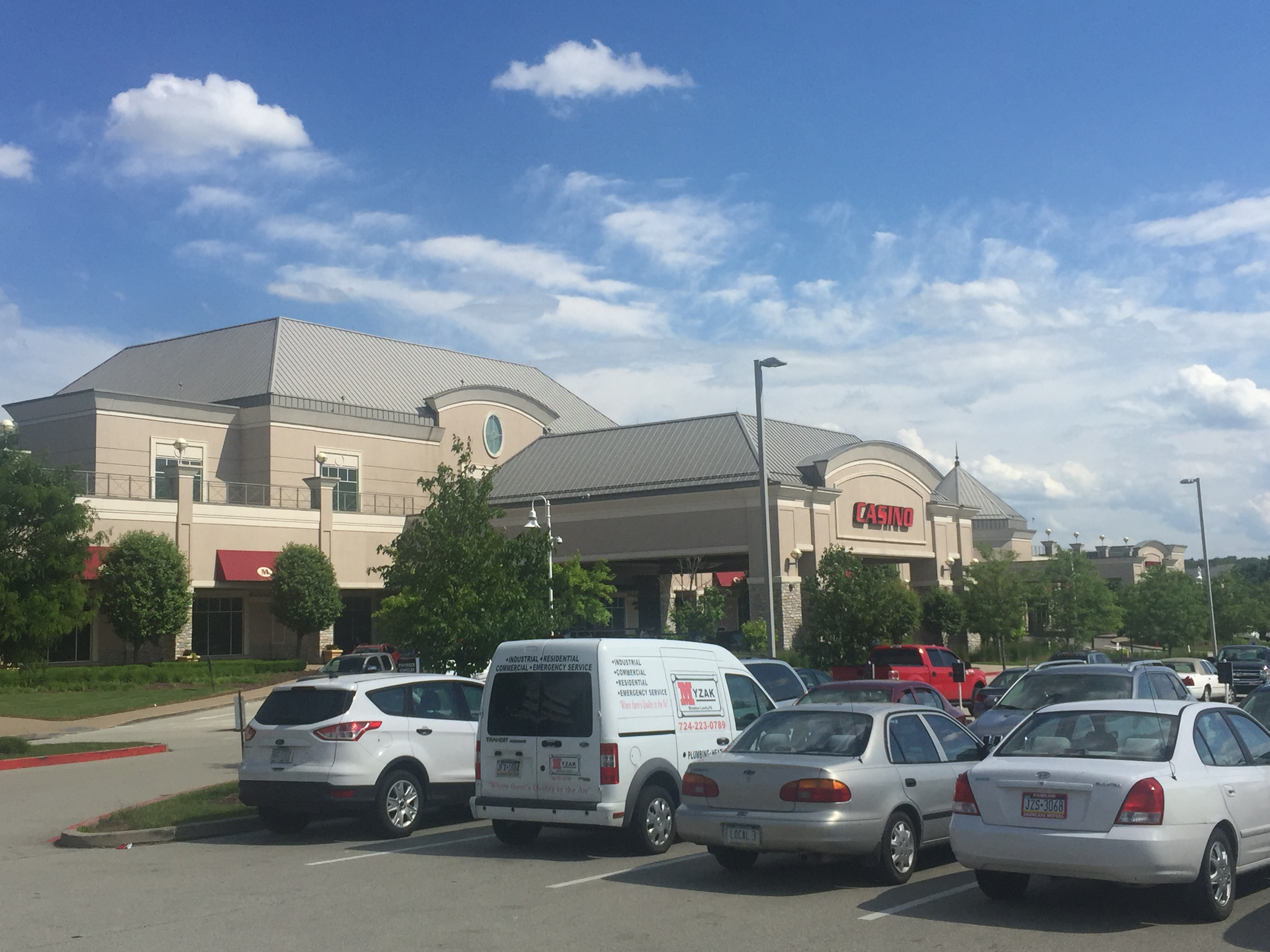
Hollywood Casino at The Meadows

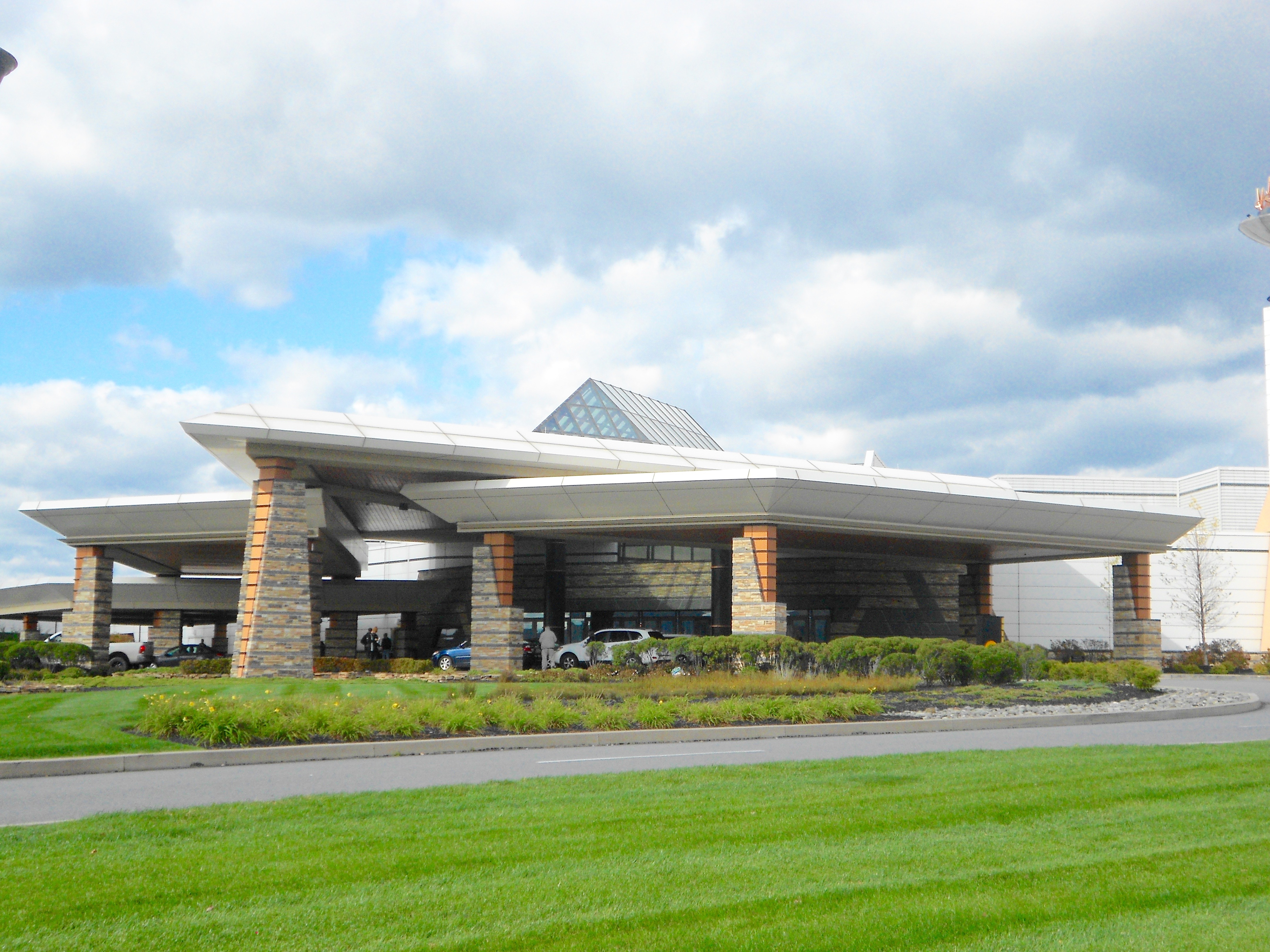
Mohegan Pennsylvania

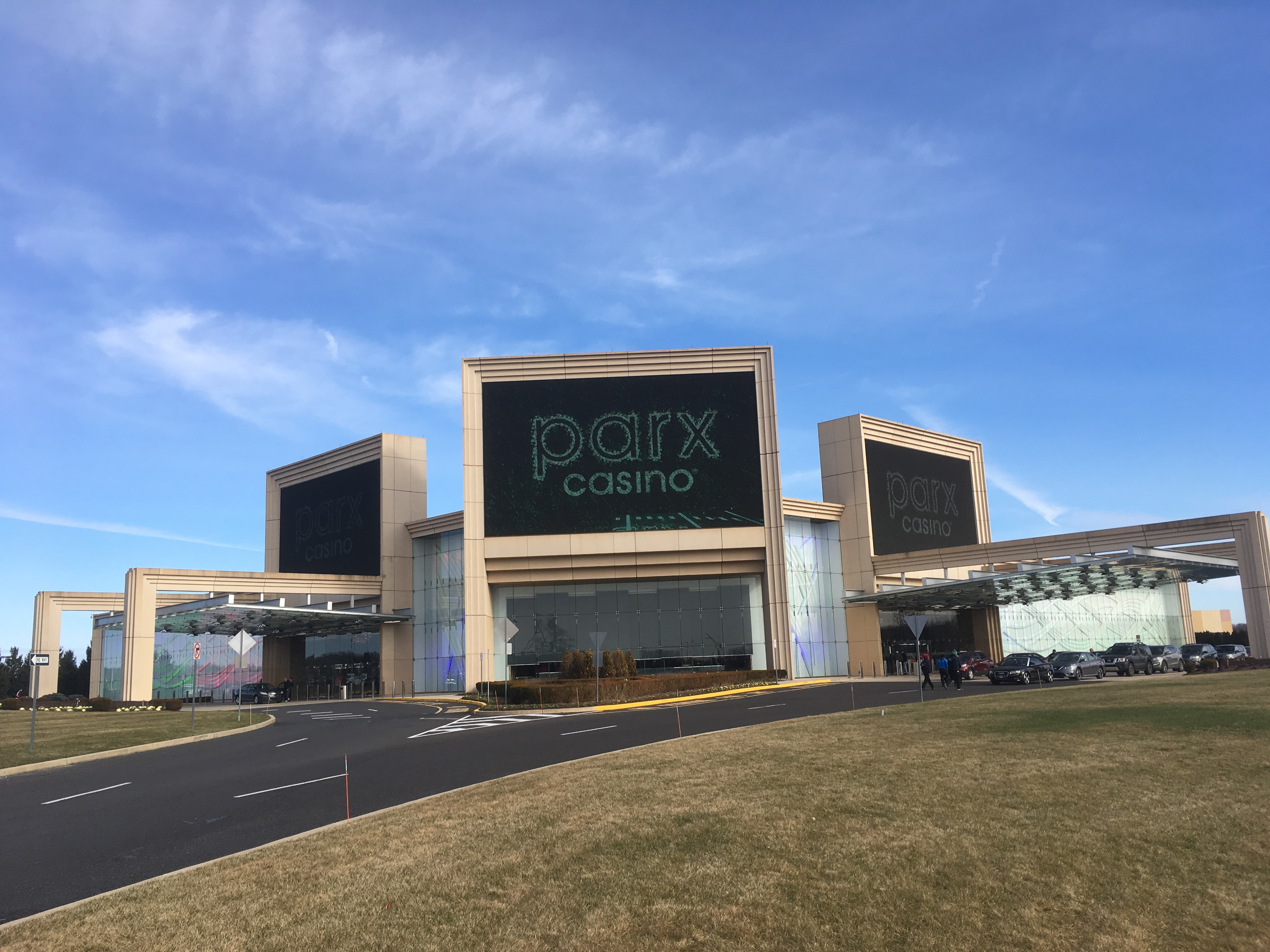
Parx Casino

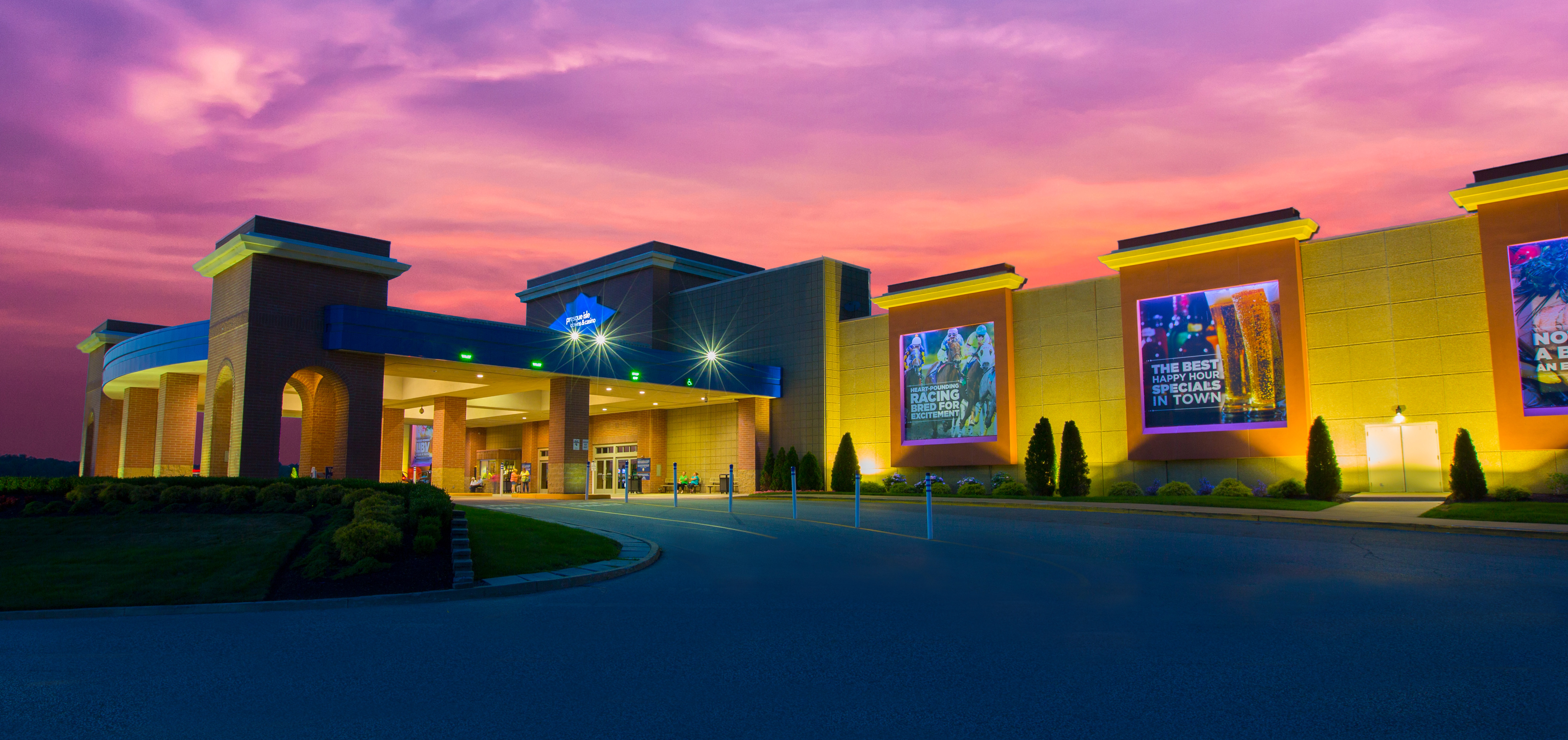
Presque Isle Downs and Casino

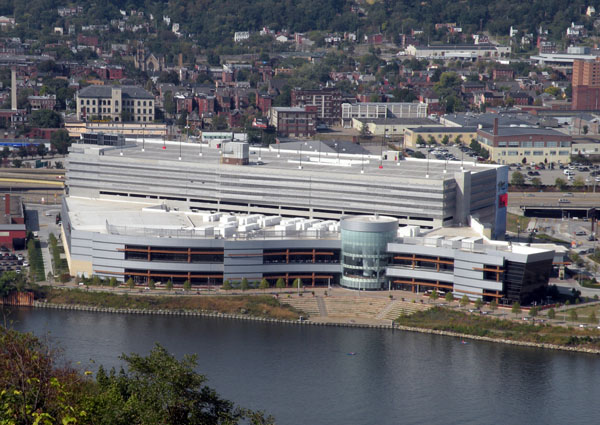
Rivers Casino Pittsburgh

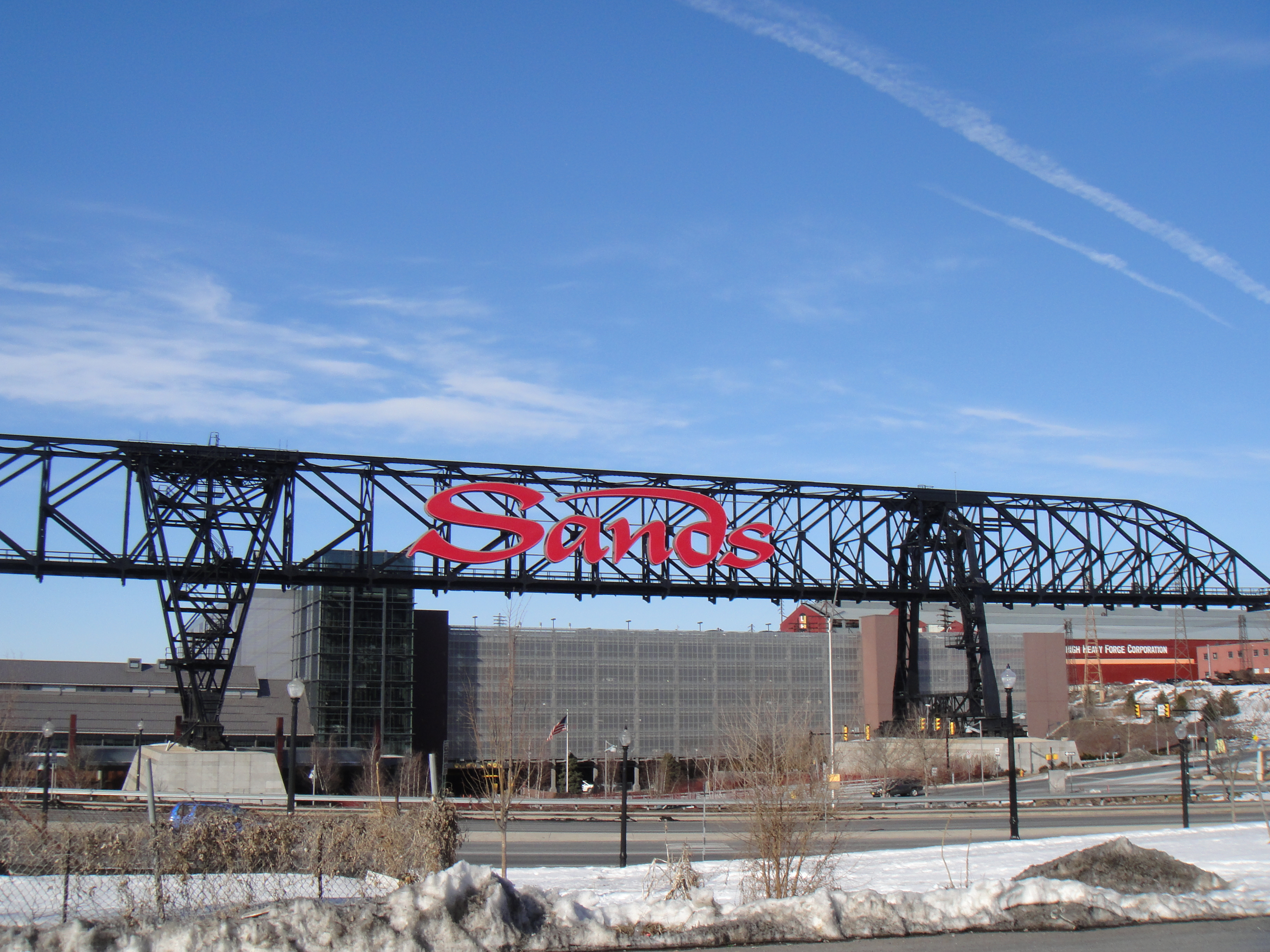
Sands Casino Resort Bethlehem (now Wind Creek Bethlehem)

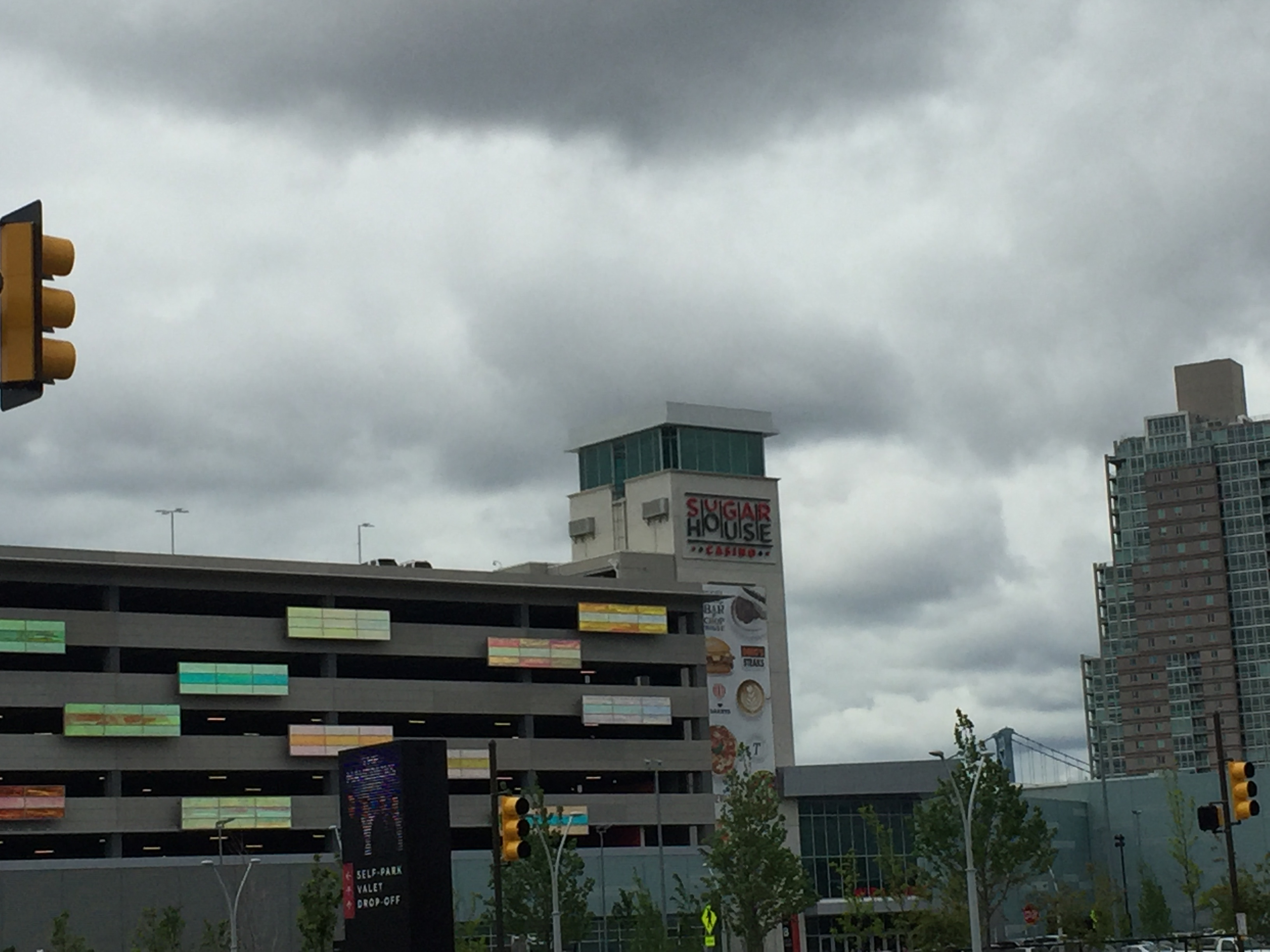
SugarHouse Casino (now Rivers Casino Philadelphia)

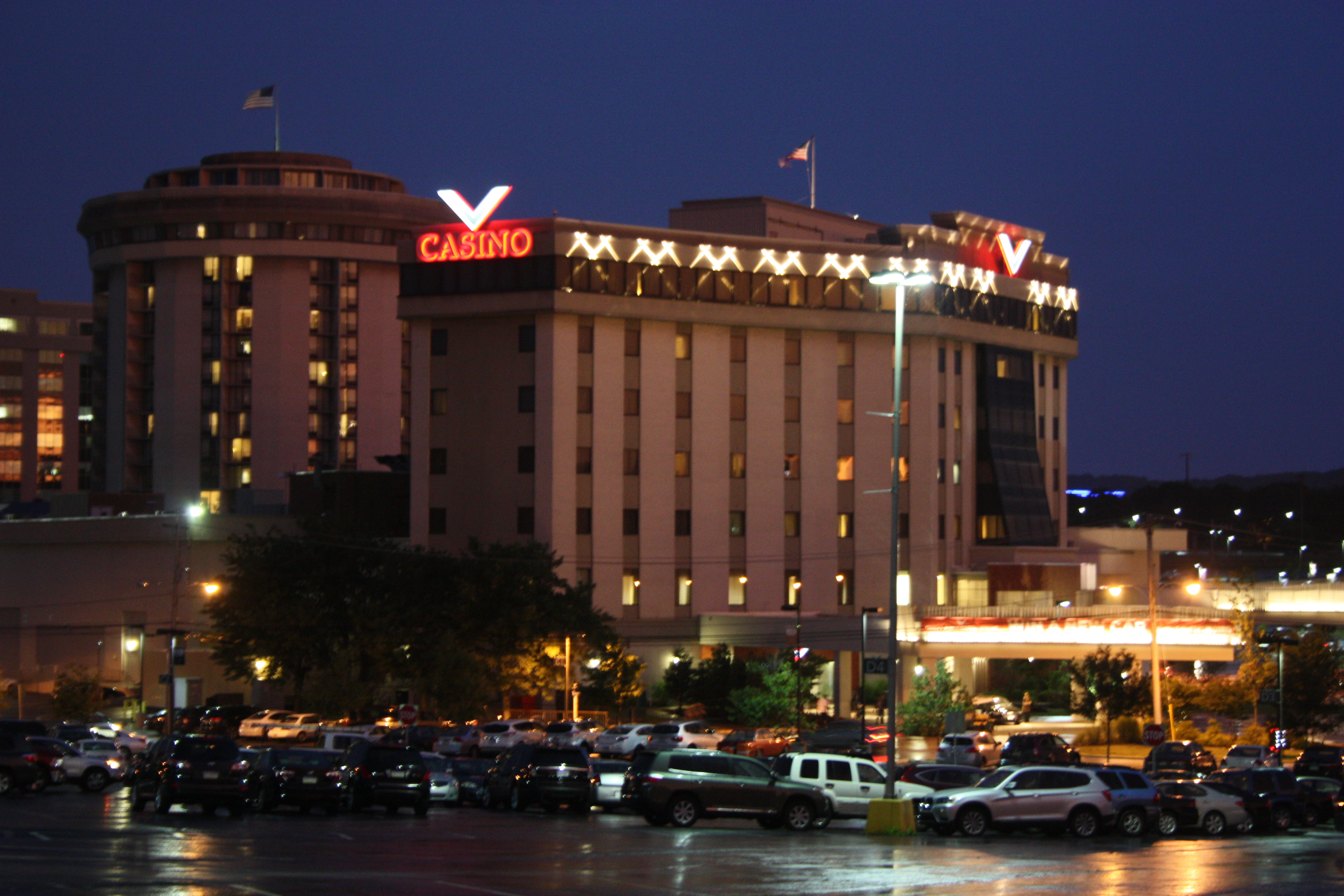
Valley Forge Casino Resort

== See also ==
- List of casinos in the United States
- List of casino hotels
- Gambling in Pennsylvania
- Pennsylvania Gaming Control Board
