= Gambling in Pennsylvania =

Gambling in the US state

Gambling in Pennsylvania includes casino gambling, the Pennsylvania Lottery, horse racing, bingo, and small games of chance conducted by nonprofit organizations and taverns under limited circumstances. Although casino gaming has been legal for less than two decades, Pennsylvania is second only to Nevada in commercial casino revenues.

On October 26, 2017, the House passed a bill to legalize online gambling. Governor Tom Wolf signed that bill into law on October 30, 2017.

== History ==
The modern purpose of gambling legislation in Pennsylvania is focused on using revenues to help create more jobs, boost the economy, and stitch together the state's financial deficit.

The PA state lottery was established in Act 91 of 1971 as a government run entity. The purpose of the lottery, as stated in the bill, is to provide property tax relief to the elderly for property taxes paid in 1971 and thereafter to persons 65 years of age or older. The lottery is also intended to curb illegal gambling operations that were taking place in PA. The bill also outlines the procedures for selling tickets, commercial advertising, and distribution of prizes. The passing of this bill led to repeated pushes for casinos in the 1980s-1990s. The first major effort to establish casinos took place in the Pocono Mountains Resort Area. Several polls were taken in the region, and in all cases residents rejected the idea. This is primarily due to a general apprehension about gambling in the 1980s. Pennsylvanians looked to Nevada as an example of what casinos could do to a society, and saw nothing but corruption and criminals.

In 1993 and 1994, there was another push for gambling, this time on riverboats in state waterways. Although supporters of riverboats were determined that legalizing riverboat gambling would bring more money into Pennsylvania, fiscal experts and social scientists had said that the gambling industry could generate crime and actually cost the state money. Likewise, the opposers of gambling said legalization would have a corrosive effect on families, and would increase the number of business failures, crimes, and traffic congestion. Another reason riverboat gambling legislation failed to be passed in the mid-1990s is that the newly elected governor, Tom Ridge, demanded a series of voter referendums as a condition for his support of any legislation. This consequently drained any existing momentum for the passage of riverboat legislation.

One last failed push for gambling in Pennsylvania occurred in 1999. A gaming bill, that was approved by the State House, would have allowed for a voter referendum to decide whether the state should have slot machines at the four racetracks, authorize riverboats, and allow video poker at taverns. However the referendum proposal was not scheduled for a vote, and this effort acquired the same outcome as legislation in the previous years.

In 2004, Pennsylvania legislators passed Act 71, making progress in their push to legalize gambling. This act, also known as the Pennsylvania Racehorse Development and Gaming Act, established the Pennsylvania Gaming Control Board and legalized casinos and racetracks within the state. It was apparent that horse racing was a viable industry that would create thousands of new jobs and bring more money into Pennsylvania. The revenues gained by the machines and tracks would primarily go towards providing property tax relief, various horse breeders in the state, local governments, as well as various funds that were established by Act 71. The moral, social, and religious grounds on which people had previously opposed gambling became less of a factor as new generations of Pennsylvanians became adults, which eventually led to a greater public acceptance of gambling. Another factor that contributed to this acceptance was that the historic link between gambling and crime had diminished as the ownership structure of casinos had shifted to publicly traded corporations. During the first full year of operations, seven casinos produced machine revenues of over one billion dollars, which yielded tax revenues of about seven hundred and sixty-six million dollars, and by the end of 2009, the revenues of Pennsylvania machines exceeded those of machines in other states with the exception of Nevada.

The success of Act 71 led to calls for more gambling legislation to be passed in Pennsylvania. The 2017 Truck stop and Satellite casino bill included in it a plan to establish 10 new mini-casino sites, as well as expand casino-style gambling to truck stops, online portals, and airports. In 2016 there were approximately 18,000 people employed by the various racetracks and casinos around the state, all of which generate approximately $1.4 billion annually in tax revenue.

In April 2025, Pennsylvania’s gambling revenue rose 10.7% year-on-year to $558.7 million, largely driven by significant growth in iGaming, which neared a monthly record with $227.7 million, up 31.3% from last year. Online slots and table games saw significant increases, while online poker dipped slightly. Hollywood Casino at Penn National led the iGaming sector, followed by Valley Forge and Rivers Casino Philadelphia. Sports betting revenue remained steady at $42.5 million, with FanDuel and DraftKings dominating the market. Land-based slots revenue dipped 1.2% to $203.1 million, but retail table games rose 2.8%. Overall, legal gambling generated $234.5 million in tax revenue for the state, with iGaming and land-based slots as the largest contributors.

In July 2025, PA's gaming revenue reached $557.7m, up 11.4% year-on-year. This was primarily driven by iGaming, up 30.9% vs 2024. Sports betting saw a 0.5% decline, generating $40.6m.

== Horse racing ==
Horse Racing was the first type of gambling to be legalized in Pennsylvania, having been legal since the passing of the Race Horse Industry Reform Act in 1959. The first race track to open after the passage of that act was Meadows Racetrack in 1963. In addition to the racetracks, there are also several off-track betting establishments with simulcasting available. Online betting and phone betting on horse racing is also legal. Greyhound racing, however, is not permitted.

=== Current racetracks ===
List of horse racetracks in the U.S. state of Pennsylvania
Racetrack	Opening Date	Type	City
Harrah's Philadelphia	January 22, 2007	Harness	Chester
Hollywood Casino at Penn National Race Course	August 30, 1972	Thoroughbred	Grantville
Hollywood Casino at The Meadows	June 28, 1963	Harness	Washington
Mohegan Pennsylvania	July 15, 1965	Harness	Wilkes-Barre
Parx Casino and Racing	November 1974	Thoroughbred	Bensalem
Presque Isle Downs	February 28, 2007	Thoroughbred	Erie

=== Current off-track betting locations ===
There are several locations offering off-track betting throughout the state. Each location is affiliated with a specific racetrack. Off-track betting has been legal since 1988. Pennsylvania was the 5th state in the country to legalize off-track betting parlors. The original legislation called for each of the four racetracks (at that time) to have a 35-mile protective radius in which the off-track locations could be established. The legislation also called for a maximum of 23 locations total throughout the state.

List of off-track betting locations in the U.S. state of Pennsylvania
Name	City	Affiliation
Mohegan Pennsylvania Lehigh Valley Race and Sportsbook	Allentown	Mohegan Sun

=== Former off-track betting locations ===
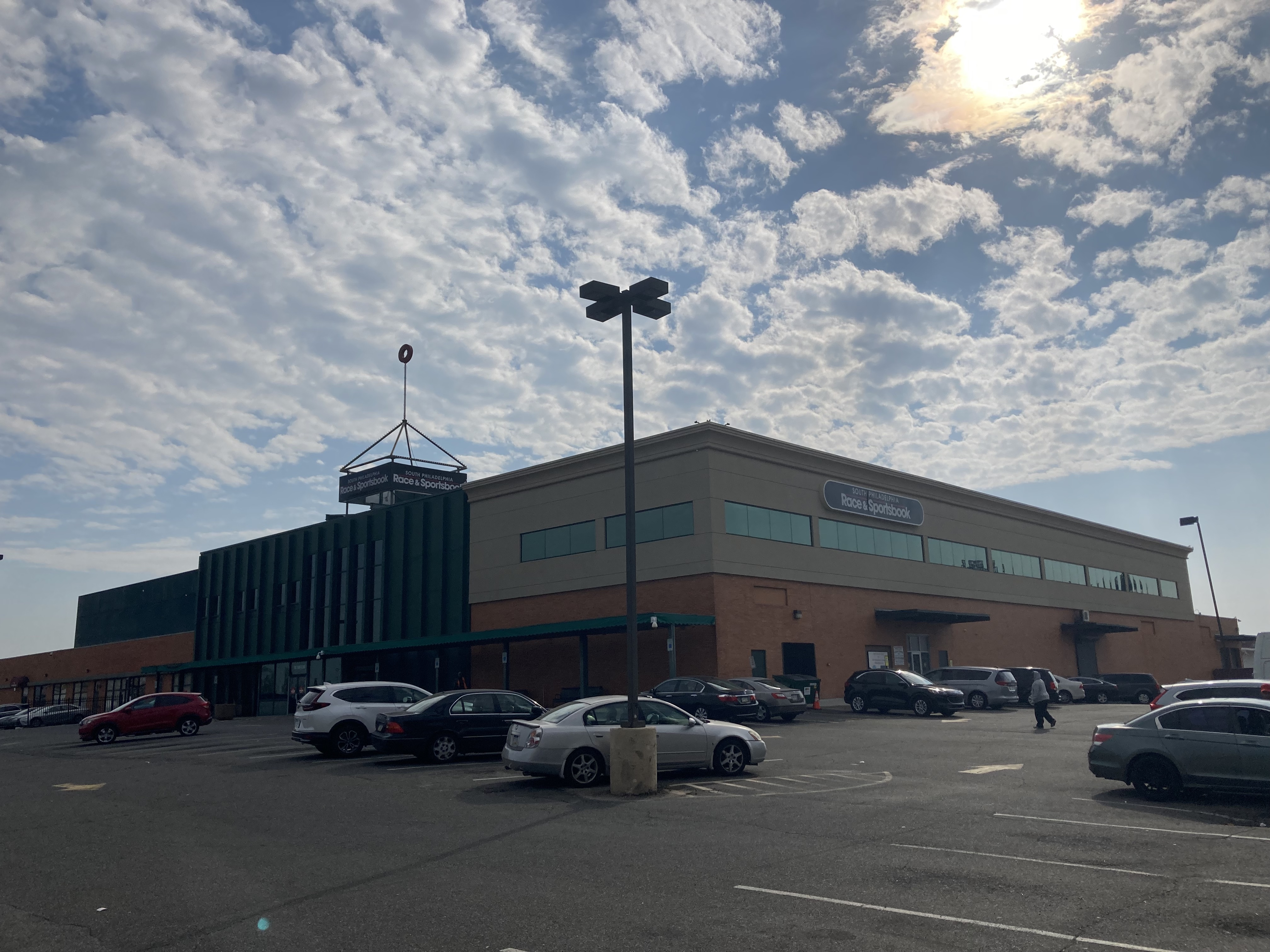
South Philadelphia Race & Sportsbook

Due to horse racing's decline in popularity, many off-track betting locations have closed.

List of former off-track betting locations in the U.S. state of Pennsylvania
Name	City	Affiliation	Opening Date	Closing Date	Reference
The Downs at Carbondale	Carbondale	Mohegan Sun		May 20, 2018
The Downs at Hazleton	Hazleton	Mohegan Sun	1997	December 31, 2011
Brandywine Turf Club	Concordville	Parx
Center City Turf Club	Philadelphia	Parx	1990	March 2016
Northeast Turf Club	Philadelphia	Parx	2001	December 2018
Oaks Race & Sportsbook	Oaks	Parx
Upper Darby Turf Club	Upper Darby	Parx		May 2010
Penn National OTW Chambersburg	Chambersburg	Penn National	1994	2018
Penn National OTW Exeter Township	Reading	Penn National	1992	March 30, 2015
Penn National OTW Johnstown	Johnstown	Penn National	1992 (owned by Meadows until 1998)	June 20, 2007
Penn National OTW Williamsport	Williamsport	Penn National		2007
The Meadows Greensburg	Greensburg	Meadows		2007
The Meadows Moon Township	Coraopolis	Meadows	1993	June 2013
The Meadows New Castle	New Castle	Meadows	1990	November 30, 2014
The Meadows West Mifflin	West Mifflin	Meadows
South Philadelphia Race & Sportsbook	Philadelphia	Parx

== Casino gambling ==
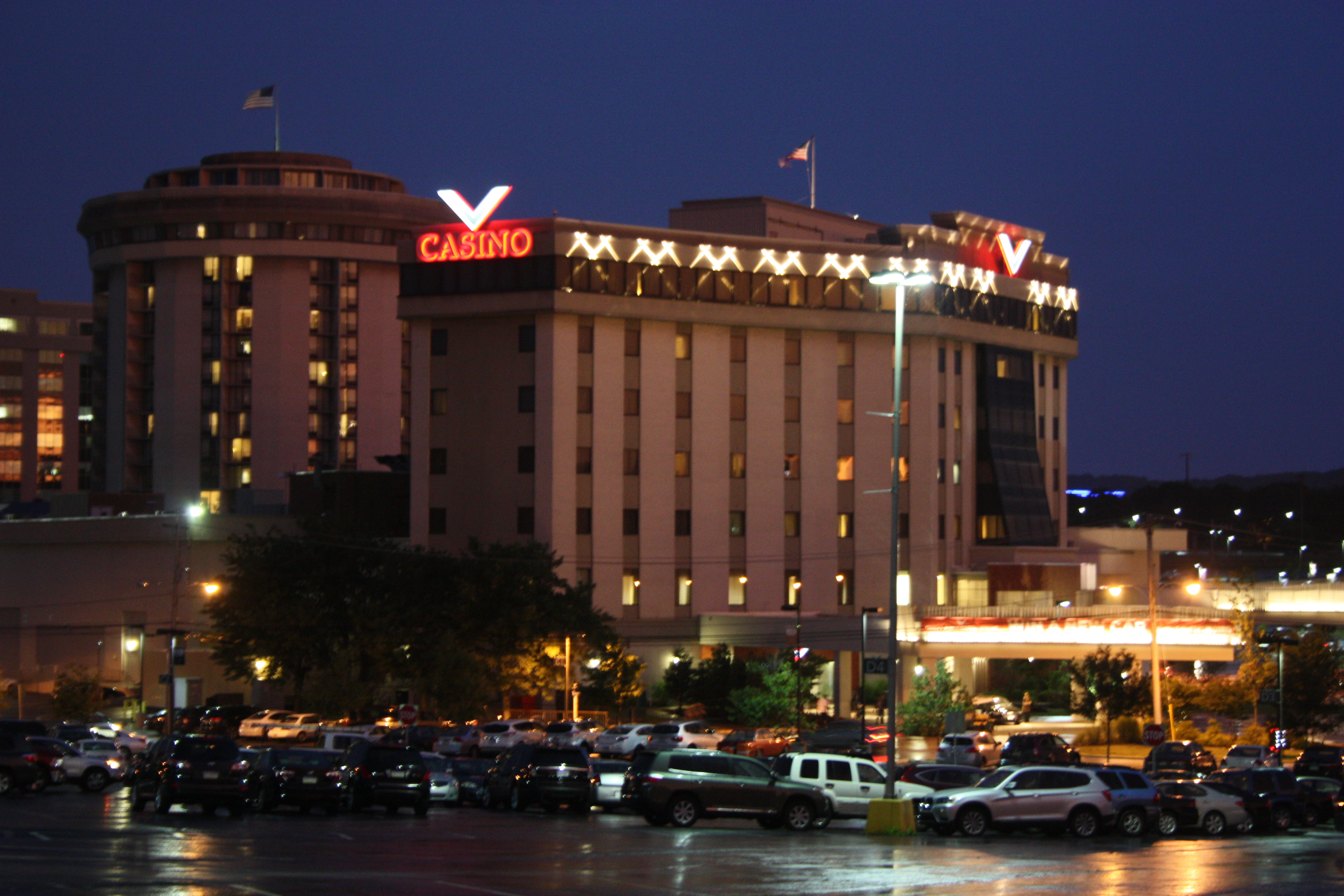
Valley Forge Casino Resort

Since its creation in 2004 Pennsylvania Gaming Control Board oversees all casinos in the state.

In 2004, the Pennsylvania Race Horse Development and Gaming Act was passed which legalized slot machines at fourteen locations beginning in 2006. The act authorized licenses for seven horse track racing locations (or racinos), five standalone casinos, and two resort casinos. All casinos can have up to 5,000 machines, except the resort licensees, which can have up to 600. The Act also mandated that two of the five stand-alone casinos be located in Philadelphia, one in Pittsburgh, and the remaining two at-large. Community organization Casino-Free Philadelphia campaigned against expansion during this period and after, both through attending Pennsylvania Gaming Control Board and by engaging in a series of protests and stunts.

Casinos in Pennsylvania have been permitted to operate table games since July 2010. Stand-alone and racinos may have up to 250 table games, while resort casinos are limited to a maximum of 50 table games. Table games legislation increased the number of slots that resort casinos may have, from 500 to 600 machines. The 4th and newest license category, satellite casinos, allows existing operators to establish smaller, secondary locations.

Pennsylvania casinos set a revenue record for 2017 as a whole, generating $3.227 billion in revenues.

=== Types ===
The Pennsylvania Gaming Control Board has authorized four categories of casino licenses:

- Category 1: Horse race track casinos
- Category 2: Stand-alone casinos
- Category 3: Resort casinos
- Category 4: Satellite casinos

== Lottery ==
The current logo of the Pennsylvania Lottery.

The Pennsylvania Lottery has been available throughout the Commonwealth since 1972. In addition to regular drawings, the state also participates in Powerball (offered through the Multi-State Lottery Association) and Mega Millions games and sells scratchcard tickets.

Draw games offered by the Pennsylvania Lottery include Pick 2, Pick 3, Pick 4, Pick 5, Treasure Hunt, Cash 5, and Match 6, as well as the multi-state games Cash4Life, Mega Millions, and Powerball. The "Pick" games are standard fixed-payout games, while Treasure Hunt, Cash 5, and Match 6 are jackpot-style games similar to Mega Millions and Powerball. The lottery also offers the annual raffle game, Millionaire Raffle.

On May 1, 2018, the Pennsylvania lottery launched keno as a part of their gaming offerings, with drawings every 4 minutes. Results are displayed at selected lottery retailers on monitors. The Pennsylvania Lottery also launched Xpress Sports later in 2018, which include two virtual sports games, football and racing. Keno and Xpress Sports games are offered at all lottery retailers, but players can view the results live via monitors at select retailers.

Pennsylvania's gaming expansion also allowed for the creation of Pennsylvania's online lottery, iLottery, which began operation on June 4, 2018. The iLottery consists of unique games; standard draw games are not available online. iLottery has received backlash from Pennsylvania's casino operators, who claim the iLottery games are slot or casino-style in nature, and for casinos to offer online gaming in the state, they are required to pay a $10 million license fee.

== Bingo and small games of chance ==
The Pennsylvania Local Option Small Games of Chance Act became law in 1988. The legislation allows limited gaming in non-profit organizations and in for-profit taverns. Game types include pull-tab games, punchboards, raffles (including special permit raffles), daily drawings, weekly drawings, fifty-fifty (50/50) drawings (including major league sports drawings), Race Night Games, and pools.

The Pennsylvania Bingo Law was passed in 1981 and allows for organizations to conduct bingo games.

== Future expansion ==
On October 26, 2017, the state legislature approved a bill that would allow casino gambling at truck stops, airports, and online, including fantasy sports. The bill was signed by Pennsylvania governor Tom Wolf on October 30, 2017. The bill also would authorize licenses for ten new satellite casinos with a requirement that they be located at least 25 miles from an existing casinos. The satellite casino licenses allowing up to 750 slot machines and 30 table games would only be granted to existing owners of casinos in Pennsylvania. Municipalities also have the option to prohibit casinos within their borders.

The passage of the October 30th gambling expansion bill made Pennsylvania the fourth state to legalize online gambling, joining Nevada, New Jersey, and Delaware. Pennsylvania is the only state to offer both gaming and lottery tickets online. Finally, the law authorized casinos to offer sports betting pending a change in federal law or a possible Supreme Court ruling. On May 14, 2018, the Supreme Court declared the Professional and Amateur Sports Protection Act of 1992 unconstitutional. Casinos began to offering sports betting on November 15, 2018. Gambling companies must pay a 34% state tax on their revenue. Betting on eSports is, however, not legal.

Truck stops may operate up to five slot machines with counties having the option to prohibit gambling at truck stops. Casinos may make agreements to operate an interactive gambling parlor with an airport authority at any of Pennsylvania's international or regional airports. Pennsylvania became the only state other than Nevada to permit gaming at airports, although as of January 2018, no airport has announced plans to offer gaming. In August 2019, Rutter's and Penn National Gaming opened the first video gaming room at a Rutter's convenience store in Manchester Township in York County. There are plans to open video gaming rooms at more Rutter's locations in 2019 and 2020.

The Pennsylvania Gaming Control Board began accepting applications for online gaming licenses in July 2018. Nine casinos in the state applied by the initial deadline. The four Pennsylvania casinos that did not apply prior to the deadline can still do so in the future, but for an increased fee.

== Fantasy sports ==
Eight providers are licensed to offer fantasy sports in Pennsylvania.

- DraftKings
- FanDuel
- Draft
- Boom Fantasy
- Sportshub Technologies
- Full Time Fantasy Sports
- Yahoo Fantasy Sports
- Fantasy Draft

== Truck Stops ==
As of December 2019, video gaming terminals are available at eight qualified Pennsylvania truck stops.

List of truck stop VGT parlors in the U.S. state of Pennsylvania
Name	Opening Date	Address	City
Bald Eagle Truck Stop	September 9, 2019	612 McElhattan Dr	McElhattan
Emlenton Truck Plaza	August 23, 2019	6406 Emlenton Clintonville Rd	Emlenton
Keystone Truck Stop	October 27, 2019	208 Keystone Dr	Loganton
Pit Stop Travel Plaza		3400 E Valley Rd	Loganton
Rutter's	August 16, 2019	2125 N Susquehanna Trl	York
Rutter's		4425 W Market St	York
Rutter's		27335 Rte 75 N	Mifflintown
Rutter's		935 Plank Rd	Duncansville

== Skill games ==
A new phenomenon across Pennsylvania is the proliferation of "skill machines". These machines, often looking like video slot machines or VGTs, are able to circumvent gaming laws due to a 2014 court decision that decided they were not slot machines. Thus, these machines can now be found at many bars, clubs, gas stations, and tobacco shops across the state. These games are largely unregulated and the state legislature has debated whether to tax the machines.

In 2026 the Pennsylvania Supreme Court ruled that so-called "skill games" were in fact slot machines and subject to the state's gambling regulation law.

== Illegal gambling ==
Even with the proliferation of gambling in the state in recent years as Pennsylvania's gaming laws become more permissive, illegal gambling is still commonplace in Pennsylvania. Many bars, private clubs, truck stops, fire company social halls, and many other establishments have long allowed slot machines or video poker machines on the premises. Legislation has often been discussed about legalizing and regulating VGTs in these establishments, but it has yet to pass. Currently, enforcement is typically done by the Pennsylvania State Police, Bureau of Liquor Control Enforcement, and there are an estimated 40,000 illegal machines throughout the state.

Even with the legalization of sports betting in the state, the high tax rate of 36% and licensure fee of $10 million may allow the underground economy of bookmakers to continue to flourish.

== See also ==
- Pennsylvania Gaming Control Board
