= Penn Mile Stakes =

- Class: Grade III
- Location: Penn National Race Course; Grantville, Pennsylvania, USA
- Inaugurated: 2013
- Race type: Thoroughbred - Flat racing
- Website: Hollywood Casino at Penn National Race Course

Race information
- Distance: 1 mile (8 furlongs)
- Surface: Turf
- Track: Left-handed
- Qualification: Three-year-olds
- Weight: 122 lbs. with allowances
- Purse: $400,000 (since 2022)

The Penn Mile Stakes is a Grade III American Thoroughbred horse race for horses aged three years old, held over a distance of one mile on the turf annually in late May or early June at Penn National Race Course at 7:30pm EST, Grantville, Pennsylvania. The event currently carries a purse of $400,000.

== History ==
With the influx of additional funds from the Penn National Race Course turning itself to a Racino the club ventured in adding higher stakes races. The race was inaugurated in 2013 with a stakes purse of $500,000.

In 2015 the event was classified as Grade III and in 2017 was upgraded to Grade II.

The event in 2020 was not held due to the COVID-19 pandemic in the United States with Penn National closed when the event was to be scheduled.

Due to weather conditions and the state of the track the 2021 running was moved to the dirt and the event was downgraded to Grade III.

In 2024 the event was downgraded by the Thoroughbred Owners and Breeders Association to Grade III status.

== Records ==
Speed record:

- 1:33.99 – Rydilluc (2013)

Largest margin of victory:

- 4 lengths – Alpyland (2026)

Most wins by a jockey:

- 3 – Javier Castellano (2014, 2025, 2026)

Most wins by a trainer:

- 4 – Mark E. Casse (2016, 2019, 2025, 2026)

Most wins by an owner:

- 2 – D. J. Stable (2025, 2026)

== Winners ==
Year	Winner	Jockey	Trainer	Owner	Time	Purse	Grade
2026	Alpyland	Javier Castellano	Mark E. Casse	D. J. Stable	1:34.17	$400,000	III
2025	Dream On	Javier Castellano	Mark E. Casse	D. J. Stable	1:35.62	$400,000	III
2024	First World War	Frankie Dettori	Brenden P. Walsh	Qatar Racing & Hunter Valley Farm	1:33.50	$400,000	III
2023	Major Dude	Irad Ortiz Jr.	Todd A. Pletcher	Spendthrift Farm	1:33.73	$400,000	II
2022	Wow Whata Summer	Tyler Conner	James L. Lawrence II	Jeremy Brooks	1:42.39	$400,000	II
2021	Gershwin	Joe Bravo	Michael Stidham	Godolphin Racing	1:39.24	$300,000	III
2020	Race not held						
2019	Moon Colony	Julien R. Leparoux	Mark E. Casse	John C. Oxley	1:37.45	$500,000	II
2018	Hawkish	Manuel Franco	James J. Toner	Robert LaPenta, A.J. Suited Racing, Madaket Stables	1:35.16	$500,000	II
2017	Frostmourne	Irad Ortiz Jr.	Christophe Clement	Green Lantern Stables	1:35.04	$500,000	II
2016	Catch a Glimpse	Florent Geroux	Mark E. Casse	Gary Barber, Michael James Ambler, Jeffrey Begg	1:34.39	$500,000	III
2015	Force the Pass	Joel Rosario	Alan E. Goldberg	Colts Neck Stables	1:34.03	$500,000	III
2014	Bobby's Kitten	Javier Castellano	Chad C. Brown	Kenneth & Sarah Ramsey	1:35.82	$500,000	Listed
2013	Rydilluc	Edgar S. Prado	Gary C. Contessa	Team Stallion Racing Stable	1:33.99	$500,000	Listed

Legend:
Dirt Turf

== See also ==
- List of American and Canadian Graded races
