= Harrah's Philadelphia =

Racing track and casino in Pennsylvania, US

Harrah's Philadelphia Casino & Racetrack

- Front entrance of Harrah's Philadelphia

- Harrah's Philadelphia Casino & Racetrack in Pennsylvania Harrah's Philadelphia (the United States)
- Interactive map of Harrah's Philadelphia Casino & Racetrack
- Location: Chester, Pennsylvania, U.S.; 777 Harrah's Blvd; 39.849873°N 75.347618°W
- Opened: January 22, 2007
- Theme: Racetrack; River; Carnival
- Gaming space: 106,100 sq ft (9,860 m^{2})
- Casino type: Racino
- Owner: Vici Properties
- Operating license holder: Caesars Entertainment
- Architect: SOSH Architects
- Previous names: Chester Downs (while in planning); Harrah's Chester (2007-2012)
- Website: HarrahsPhilly.com

Harrah's Philadelphia Casino & Racetrack is a harness racing track and casino (a racino) on the Chester, Pennsylvania waterfront. It is owned by Vici Properties and operated by Caesars Entertainment.

== History ==
The track was built on the site of the former Sun Shipbuilding campus. Its first harness racing season opened on September 10, 2006.

On September 27, 2006, the Pennsylvania Gaming Control Board gave Harrah's Chester its slots license. The Board approved Harrah's application for the permanent slot-machine gaming operator license on December 20, 2006. The casino opened on January 22, 2007, one day earlier than anticipated. Catania Engineering Associates performed the site design for this project.

The casino began offering live table games on July 18, 2010.

In May 2012, Harrah's Chester changed its name to Harrah's Philadelphia to appeal to a broader market.

In 2018, Vici Properties, a real estate company that had earlier been spun off from Caesars, purchased the land and buildings of Harrah's Philadelphia from Caesars for $242 million. Caesars leased back the property for $21 million per year.

On January 22, 2019, sports betting began at Harrah's Philadelphia with a testing period; a formal grand opening occurred on January 24, 2019. Sports betting takes place at Caesars Sportsbook, a 4,322-square-foot (401.5 m^{2}) sportsbook with an odds board, 6 teller windows, self-betting kiosks, and 2 terminals for betting on horse races. The sportsbook has 19 lounge seats, 11 high-top tables, bar seating, and over 45 big-screen TVs. Sports betting is available on multiple sports including football, basketball, baseball, hockey, soccer, and college sports.

== Amenities ==
The casino consists of over 2,000 slot machines, 100,000 square feet (9,300 m^{2}) of gaming space, a 14,000-square-foot (1,300 m^{2}) event center, and numerous drineries, eateries, meeting rooms, and retail establishments.

=== Bars ===
- C-Bar
- Copper Mug
- Harrah's Backyard
- O'Shea's

=== Meeting rooms ===
- Caesars
- Harrah's
- Horseshoe

=== Restaurants ===
- Market Express
- Mien
- Philly Tap and Tavern
- The Market

=== Shopping ===
- Gift Shop

== Harness racing ==
Harrah's Philadelphia currently runs a 110 day live meet that runs from early April to late-December. Race days are typically operated on Sunday, Thursday, and Friday, as well as occasional holidays that fall on Saturday and Monday. Racing at Harrah's is usually scheduled to begin at 12:25PM. The racing broadcast is available for wagering via simulcast from other racetracks throughout the United States and Canada.

The track is 5/8 mile (1.0 km) in length and has a limestone-based surface. The midpoint of 1-mile (1.6 km) races comes on a bridge that hangs over the Delaware River and provides a view of freight ships passing by. Although the track is equipped with lights, it has not operated a schedule with regular night racing since 2011.

The racing paddock at Harrah's holds up to 131 horses. Because of limited space, horses are shipped in to the paddock rather than stabled on-track.

Harrah's Philadelphia was the host site of PA Harness Week, a weekly show aired on Philadelphia's local Comcast SportsNet channel. It aired its final episode on August 29, 2015. The show was drawing roughly 3,500 viewers per week at the time of its cancellation.

=== Track announcers ===
- Multiple (2006)
- James Witherite (2007–2013)
- Michael Bozich (2014–present)

== See also ==
- List of casinos in Pennsylvania
- List of casinos in the United States
