= Altemose =

Altemose is a surname. Notable people with the surname include:

- Charlie Altemose (1913–1995), American soccer player
- J. Leon Altemose (1939–2008), American developer and contractor
