= Rivers Casino Philadelphia =

Casino in Pennsylvania, United States

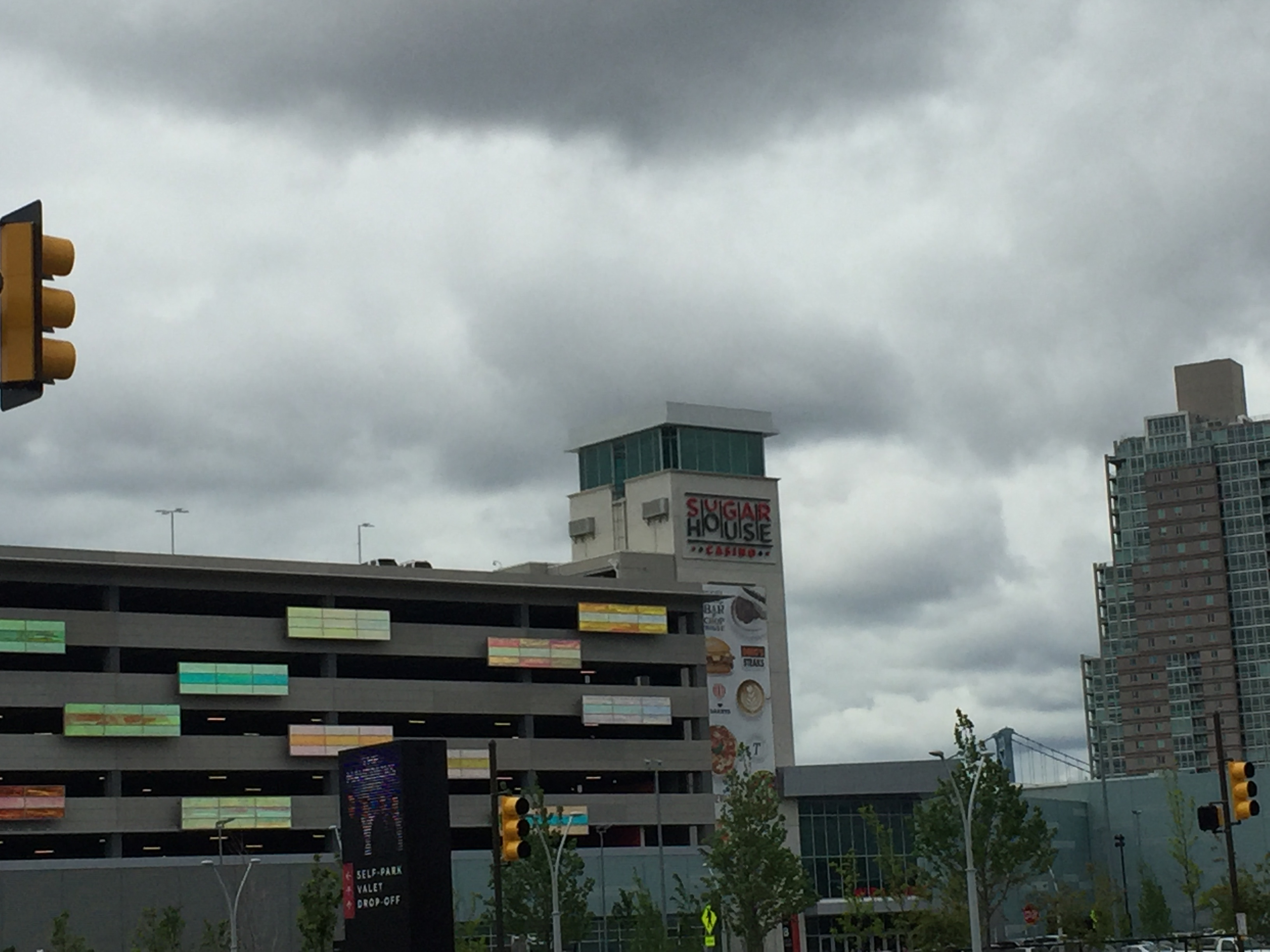
- SugarHouse Casino in 2017

- Rivers Casino in Philadelphia and Pennsylvania Rivers Casino Philadelphia (Pennsylvania) Rivers Casino Philadelphia (the United States)
- Interactive map of Rivers Casino Philadelphia
- Location: 1001 North Delaware Avenue Philadelphia, Pennsylvania 19125; 39.9642°N 75.1314°W
- Opened: September 23, 2010
- Theme: Contemporary; Industrial
- No. of rooms: None.
- Gaming space: 45,000 sq ft (4,200 m^{2})
- Signature attractions: The Event Center
- Notable restaurants: Jack's Bar + Grill
- Casino type: Land-based; Riverfront
- Owner: Rush Street Gaming
- Architect: Cope Linder
- Previous names: SugarHouse Casino (2010-2019)
- Website: www.riverscasino.com/philadelphia/

Rivers Casino Philadelphia, formerly SugarHouse Casino, is a casino entertainment development along the Delaware River in Philadelphia, Pennsylvania's Fishtown neighborhood, one of five stand-alone casinos awarded a gaming license on December 20, 2006 by the Pennsylvania Gaming Control Board.

== History ==
SugarHouse Casino was awarded a gaming license on December 20, 2006 by the Pennsylvania Gaming Control Board, along with four others. Many neighborhood residents sought to prevent the development of the casino due to quality of life issues. Residents of the Fishtown neighborhood have taken the lead in the creation and leadership of the prominent anti-casino organizations, including Casino Free Philadelphia, the Philadelphia Neighborhood Alliance, and Neighbors Allied for the Best Riverfront. On the other side, Fishtown Action (FACT), the largest membership organization in the nearby community with over 600 members, has continuously supported the casino project. This support is largely in part because of a community benefits agreement along with the New Kensington CDC.

The 1,300,000-square-foot (120,000 m^{2}) casino complex is located on the 22-acre (8.9 ha) site of the former Jack Frost Sugar Refinery, hence the "SugarHouse" name; and on a site where a British Revolutionary Era fort was once located. Phase I, estimated at $550 million, includes a casino floor with 3,000 slot machines, and tables, along with a variety of retail and dining outlets. Future phases of the project include a 500-room hotel with health spa, a 30,000-square-foot (2,800 m^{2}) event center, and expanded dining and retail facilities.

It was estimated that SugarHouse Casino would generate in excess of $1 billion in gaming taxes to the Commonwealth of Pennsylvania and the City of Philadelphia over the first five years of operation.

On April 15, 2008, the Pennsylvania Supreme Court convened in Philadelphia to determine if the city had the right to lease the land where the casino was to be located. The city's Mayor Michael Nutter revoked the SugarHouse license in January, and the city's lawyers claimed the city never had the authority to issue the license in the first place. The owners of SugarHouse Casino argued that the city could not legally revoke a license to build on the riverbank. On August 22, the Supreme Court ruled that the permits were legal.

Groundbreaking on the project began on October 9, 2009. The casino opened on September 23, 2010.

On July 22, 2014, SugarHouse casino broke ground on a project to expand the casino floor, add restaurants, add a parking garage, and bring more amenities to the riverfront. The expansion opened on May 9, 2016. SugarHouse began offering online gambling in New Jersey in 2016. In fall 2018, SugarHouse added online sports betting in New Jersey.

On December 13, 2018, sports betting began at SugarHouse Casino with a two-day test period. Official sports betting began two days later. SugarHouse became the first casino in the Philadelphia area to offer sports betting. The casino initially operated out of a temporary sportsbook.

On May 28, 2019, SugarHouse Casino became the first casino in Pennsylvania to offer online sports betting within the state. The permanent $5 million, 5,700-square-foot (530 m^{2}) BetRivers Sportsbook opened in October, consisting of a large HD video wall that can broadcast multiple games, six betting windows, and 22 self-serve betting kiosks. The casino offers betting on multiple sports including football, basketball, hockey, boxing, and soccer. Later in 2019, SugarHouse's parent company, Rush Street Gaming, announced that the casino would be rebranded as Rivers Casino Philadelphia, matching the name used by Rush Street's other properties, including Rivers Casino Pittsburgh. The new brand name became official on October 29.

On July 17, 2019, SugarHouse conducted a soft launch for online gambling in Pennsylvania; the testing period lasted two days. Online gambling offered by SugarHouse consists of slot machines and table games, with online poker to launch at a later date.

== Dining ==
Rivers Casino offers the following dining options:

- Geno's Steaks
- Rita's Italian Ice
- Coffee Spot
- Mian
- Jack's Bar & Grill
- Martorano's Prime

== Entertainment ==
The Event Center at Rivers Casino is home to concerts and entertainment performances. Live music is also available at Jack's Bar & Grill.

== Transportation ==
The Rivers Casino is served by the SEPTA Route 15 trolley and the SEPTA City Bus routes 25, 43, and 76 at the Frankford and Delaware Avenue station. It is also adjacent to the Delaware River Trail.

== See also ==
- List of casinos in Pennsylvania
- Foxwoods Casino Philadelphia
- Parx Casino and Racing
