= VFCC (disambiguation) =

VFCC may refer to:

- Valley Forge Christian College, former name of the University of Valley Forge, a closed American four-year residential university that was located in Phoenixville, Pennsylvania, near Valley Forge National Historical Park
- Valley Forge Convention Center, site of the Valley Forge Casino Resort, a casino near King of Prussia, Pennsylvania, which opened in 2012

an event complex in King of Prussia, Pennsylvania

- Vancouver Film Critics Circle, an association of media professionals in Vancouver, British Columbia
