= York Galleria =

Shopping mall northeast of York, Pennsylvania, U.S.

Coordinates: 39.98961°N 76.67487°W

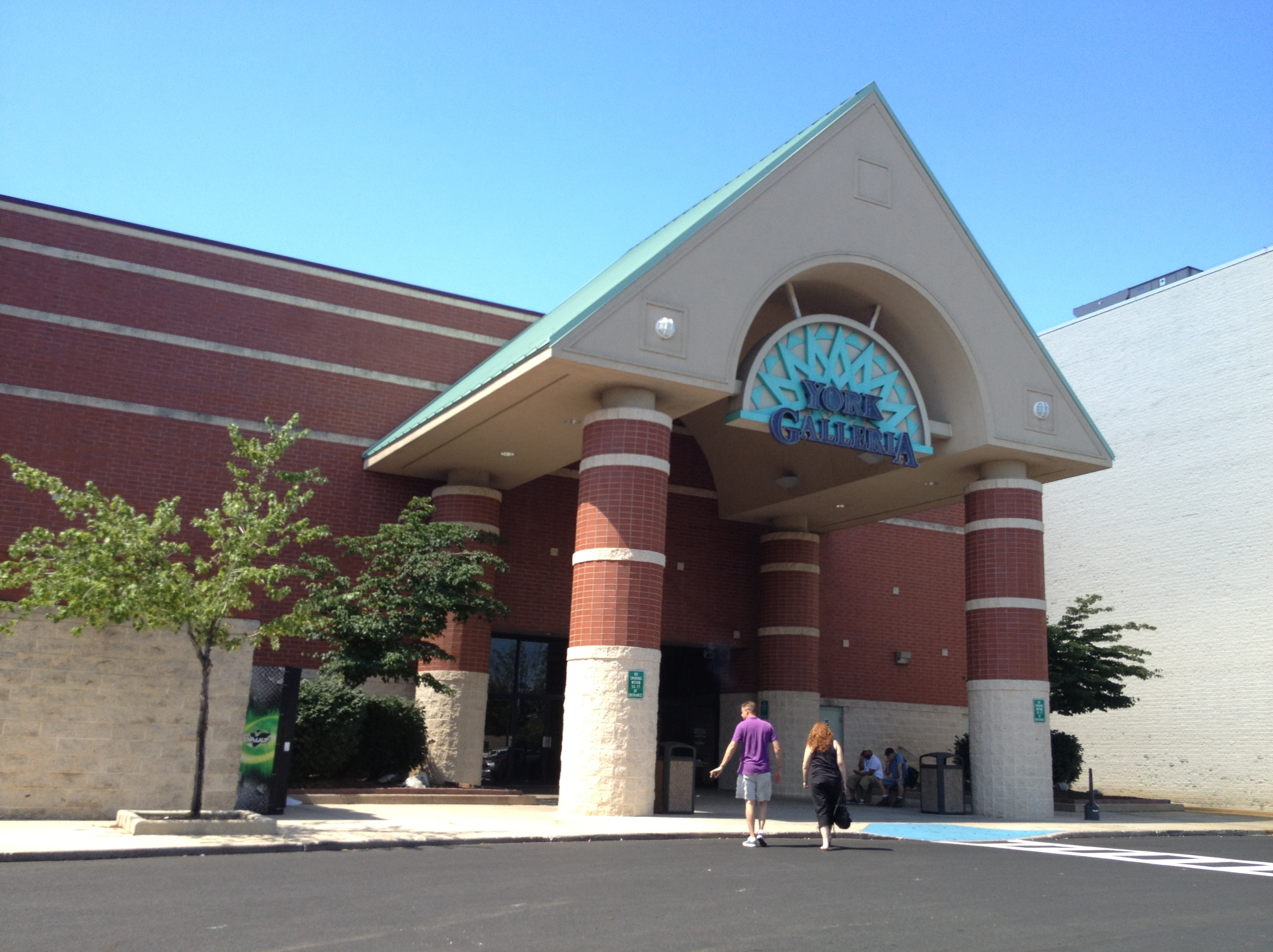
- Entrance to York Galleria, July 2012
- Location: Springettsbury Township, York County, Pennsylvania, U.S.
- Address: 2899 Whiteford Rd York, PA 17402
- Opened: 1989; 37 years ago
- Developer: Zamias Services, Inc.
- Owner: CBL Properties
- Num. of stores: 49
- Num. of anchor tenants: 5
- Floor area: 764,514 sq. ft.
- Floors: 2
- Public transit: rabbittransit bus: 1E
- Website: yorkgalleria.com

The York Galleria is an enclosed shopping mall located northeast of York, Pennsylvania at the intersection of U.S. Route 30 and Pennsylvania Route 24. The mall features the traditional retailers Boscov's and Marshalls, in addition to Hollywood Casino York, Extra Space Storage, and PA Fitness. As of 2026, the mall includes a number of retailers such as Bath & Body Works, American Eagle Outfitters, H&M, JD Sports, and Victoria's Secret.

== Restaurants ==
The food court on the upper level contains counter service restaurants. A Red Robin restaurant opened in the fall of 2014 in the mall's east-side parking lot.

== Tenancy changes ==
In 1999, three new retail stores opened next to York Galleria: Target, Kohl's, and Michaels. Kohl's opened on April 16, 1999. Target opened next on October 10, 1999.

In January 2015, it was announced that the mall's JCPenney would shutter as part of a strategy to optimize its brick-and-mortar format. The previous JCPenney outpost was reconstructed for additional in-line specialty retailers including an H&M, in addition to a Marshalls, and a Gold's Gym with an indoor pool and sauna.. The Gold's Gym space would later be replaced with PA Fitness.

On April 19, 2018, it was announced that The Bon-Ton would undergo liquidation, closing all stores, including the Galleria outpost. The Bon-Ton outpost was renovated into an Extra Space Storage facility.

On April 26, 2018, it was announced that Sears would shutter as part of an ongoing decision to phase out of its traditional brick-and-mortar format. The former Sears outpost's lower level was reconstructed to make room for Hollywood Casino York.

== Hollywood Casino York ==
In February 2018, Springettsbury Township officials announced that Penn National Gaming expressed interest in using the York Galleria area as a potential location for a casino. The casino operator won the right from the Pennsylvania Gaming Control Board to build or renovate such a facility, with up to 750 slot machines and plans for thirty table games, in the south central part of the state – specifically, within 15 miles (24 km) of Yoe.

The township solicitor said Penn National Gaming was looking at the first floor of the Sears property. A public hearing was held in late July 2018 for feedback on proposed ordinance changes for a potential gambling facility. Many expressed disapproval of a local casino and no one spoke in favor of the casino during the hearing. A township supervisor reported that several residents separately informed him of support; after the hearing, supervisors approved related changes to the ordinances.

Penn National Gaming had a September 2018 deadline to apply to the control board to open a mini-casino in York County, and confirmed that month that it had selected York Galleria's former Sears store as such a site, and filed an application with the Gaming Control Board on September 12, 2018. A public hearing was held on November 1, with fourteen speakers, including four current and former township supervisors. One resident, who said thirty-eight neighbors shared his opinion, expressed his opposition to the casino; all others who spoke supported it.

As of February 2019, the proposal remained subject to a final closed-to-the-public board hearing, during which Penn National would make its presentation. As of June 2019, Penn National was still waiting for confirmation of a date for its presentation, with the delay attributed to this first test of state gambling laws that had been changed in 2017, as well as to the prospect of a casino being the first that would be placed in a mall.

A control board spokesman said a license was expected by the end of the 2019, and a Penn National spokesman said construction would begin as soon as possible after such approval, with completion estimated twelve to eighteen months thereafter.

In August 2019, Springettsbury Township supervisors voted to approve Penn National's redevelopment plans for the Hollywood Casino York. In October 2019, a Penn National spokesman estimated that the fourth quarter of 2020 was the target opening date; the mall owner also began work on the site in anticipation of control board approval.

On December 18, 2019, the Pennsylvania Gaming Control Board granted Penn National Gaming a license for the casino.

In March 2020, Penn National suspended construction due to the coronavirus pandemic; by August 2020, the opening date was pushed back to the second half of 2021.

In April 2021, the casino's opening was set for August, and hiring for casino employees was initiated. Hollywood Casino York opened on August 12, 2021.

== See also ==
- List of shopping malls in Pennsylvania
