= Delaware River Trail =

Multi-use trail in Pennsylvania, United States

- Length: 3.3 miles (5.3 km)
- Location: Philadelphia, Pennsylvania
- Established: 2009
- Use: Multi-use trail
- Season: All
- Sights: Spruce Street Harbor Park; Benjamin Franklin Bridge; Penn Treaty Park; Penn's Landing
- Surface: Asphalt; Gravel
- Maintainer: The Delaware River Waterfront Corporation
- Website: www.delawareriverwaterfront.com/where-to-go/delaware-river-trail

The Delaware River Trail is a multi-use trail along the west bank of the Delaware River in Philadelphia, Pennsylvania, United States. Partially complete, the trail currently runs 3.3 miles (5.3 km) from Pier 70 in South Philadelphia to Penn Treaty Park in Fishtown. Once complete, it is planned to run from Oregon Avenue in South Philadelphia to Allegheny Avenue in the River Wards, a distance of 6 miles (9.7 km).

The first sections of the trail opened in 2009, with its largest section opening in 2022. Planning is ongoing to expand the trail farther north. Between July 2025 and June 2026, one segment of the trail near Spruce Street counted over 330,000 bicycle trips, as well as over 314,000 pedestrian trips.

Parts of the trail belong to the East Coast Greenway, a 3,000-mile (4,800 km) trail system connecting Maine and Florida.

== Route description ==
The Delaware River Trail currently runs from Pier 70 in South Philadelphia to Penn Treaty Park in Fishtown. Beginning in the south Pier 70, the trail winds through an interim route alongside the river before connecting to the asphalt and concrete section at the intersection of Washington and Christopher Columbus. At this area, the trail passes a United States Coast Guard station, as well as Washington Avenue Green, a riverfront park that once hosted the Washington Avenue Immigration Station.

The trail then follows the route of Christopher Columbus Boulevard between Washington Avenue and Penn Street, passing the Spruce Street Harbor Park, the Independence Seaport Museum, and Penn's Landing, before running underneath the Benjamin Franklin Bridge.

The trail runs between the water and a Rivers Casino location, briefly splitting into both a paved segment and a gravel path, before arriving at Penn Treaty Park.

== History ==
The Delaware River Trail opened its first section, a 2-mile (3.2 km) interim path between Washington Avenue and Pier 70, in November 2009. Initial funding for the first section came from the William Penn Foundation, and was built in partnership between the Delaware River Waterfront Corporation (DRWC) and Center City District.

Another portion of the trail running alongside Christopher Columbus Boulevard between Washington Avenue and Spring Garden Street began construction in the summer of 2020, and was initially aiming for a completion in fall 2021. Unexpected construction issues concerning underground utilities and structural problems delayed the opening of this segment to April 2022. The Christopher Columbus Boulevard segment features a bike lane separated from both the road and the sidewalk, picnic tables, benches, and new lamp posts. Trips along this segment of the trail grew 22% in the year after the section opened, including a 28% increase during rush hour.

In 2023, the DRWC sought community feedback for another expansion of the trail in the north, between Penn Treaty Park and Lehigh Avenue.

In October 2025, the city of Philadelphia cleared out homeless encampments from a section of the trail between Washington Avenue and Pier 70. Another clearing of encampments took place in March 2026, which faced criticism from homeless advocates, who asked for the creation of "safe sleep areas" for people to camp before attaining permanent housing.

== See also ==
- Schuylkill River Trail
- List of parks in Philadelphia
