= Hollywood Casino at Penn National Race Course =

Horse racing track and casino in Pennsylvania

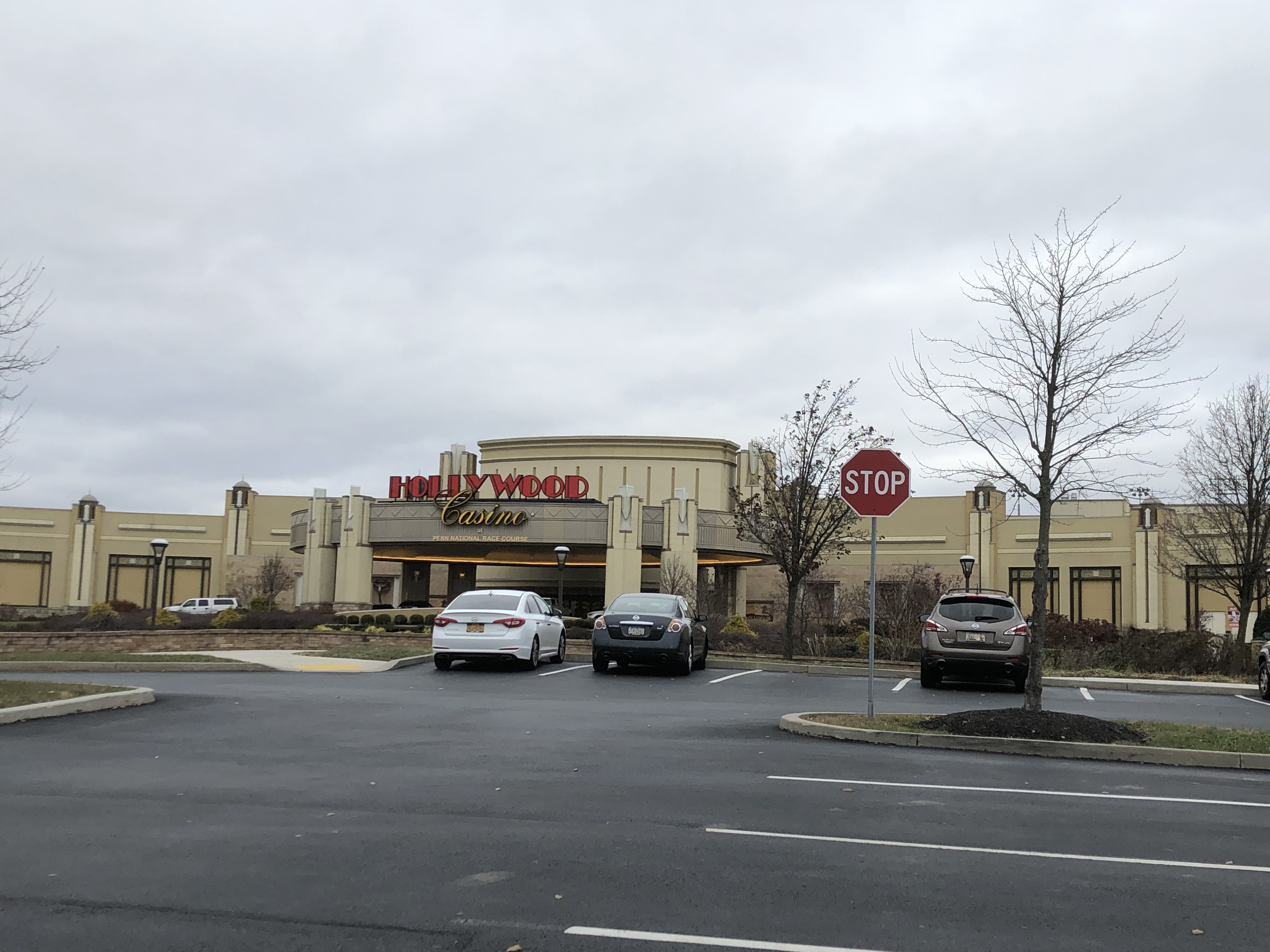

- Hollywood Casino at Penn National Race Course in Pennsylvania Hollywood Casino at Penn National Race Course (the United States)
- Interactive map of Hollywood Casino at Penn National Race Course
- Location: Grantville, Pennsylvania, U.S.; 777 Hollywood Boulevard; 40°23′48″N 76°39′31″W
- Opened: Racetrack: August 30, 1972; Casino: February 12, 2008
- Casino type: Racino
- Owner: Gaming and Leisure Properties
- Operating license holder: Penn Entertainment
- Website: hollywoodpnrc.com
Penn National Race Course
- Interactive map of Penn National Race Course
- Date opened: August 30, 1972
- Course type: Flat racing

The Hollywood Casino at Penn National Race Course is a thoroughbred horse racing track and casino which is located in Grantville, Pennsylvania, 17 miles (27 km) east of Harrisburg. It is owned by Gaming and Leisure Properties and operated by Penn Entertainment.

This track is also home to Eclipse Special Award winner Rapid Redux and his trainer David J. Wells.

== History ==
The track opened on August 30, 1972. It consists of a 1 mile (1.6 km) dirt course and a seven-furlong turf course.

It features the $150,000 Pennsylvania Governor's Cup Handicap for horses three-years-old and up which run five furlongs on the turf. In 2009, Cardashi, ridden by jockey David Cora, won in a 29–1 upset.

In 2013, the inaugural Penn Mile on turf was run. Its first winner was three-year-old Rydilluc, which finished with a time of 1:33.99. As of 2017, this race is now the only Graded stakes race event at the track that is classified as a Grade III race with stakes of $400,000.

=== Controversies ===
This racetrack has been under ongoing investigations through the years by the FBI for race fixing, which included people working in the race office, trainers and vets.

=== Track announcers ===
- Tony Bentley (1972-1973)
- Fred Lipkin (1974-1984)
- John Bogar (1985-2025)
  - Longest tenured announcer in America
- Nathan Klein (2026)

== Stakes Races ==
The following Graded events were held at Penn National in 2026.

Grade III

- Penn Mile Stakes

Other Stake races

- Penn Oaks
- Alphabet Soup H (PA Bred)
- Lyphard Stakes (PA Bred)
- Crowd Pleaser Stakes (PA Bred)
- Pennsylvania Governor's Cup
- Marshall Jenney Handicap (PA Bred)
- Blue Mountain Stakes (PA Bred)
- South Mountain Stakes (PA Bred)

Discontinued

- Danzig Stakes (PA Bred)
- New Start Stakes (PA Bred)
- Fabulous Strike Stakes
- Robellino Stakes (PA Bred)
- Penn Ladies Dash

== Casino ==
The Hollywood Casino opened at Penn National on February 12, 2008. On July 13, 2010, table games began operation. As of July 2010, Hollywood Casino has over 2,480 slot machines and fifty-four tables. Table games include: fourteen Poker tables, Black Jack, Roulette, Craps, Pai-Gow Poker, Three and Four Card Poker, Mini-Baccarat, and Let-It-Ride.

The Pennsylvania Gaming Control Board approved a sports betting license for the Hollywood Casino on October 3, 2018.

On November 15, 2018, sports betting began at the Hollywood Casino with a two-day test; official sports betting began on November 17, 2018. This casino then became the first casino in Pennsylvania to offer sports betting.

On July 15, 2019, the Hollywood Casino conducted a soft launch for online gambling, with the full launch occurring on July 18, 2019 after a testing period. Online gambling offered by Hollywood Casino consists of slot machines and table games, with online poker to launch at a later date.

In the summer of 2020, the Pennsylvania Department of Health and the Pennsylvania Gaming Control Board ruled that smoking was banned in the casino, ensuring smoke-free gaming; however, there are two covered places in front of the casino where smoking is still permitted.

Penn National Gaming also operates other casinos under the Hollywood Casino brand.

== See also ==
- List of casinos in Pennsylvania
- List of casinos in the United States
- List of casino hotels
