= Spruce Street Harbor Park =

Park in Philadelphia, Pennsylvania

Coordinates: 39°56′40″N 75°08′29″W

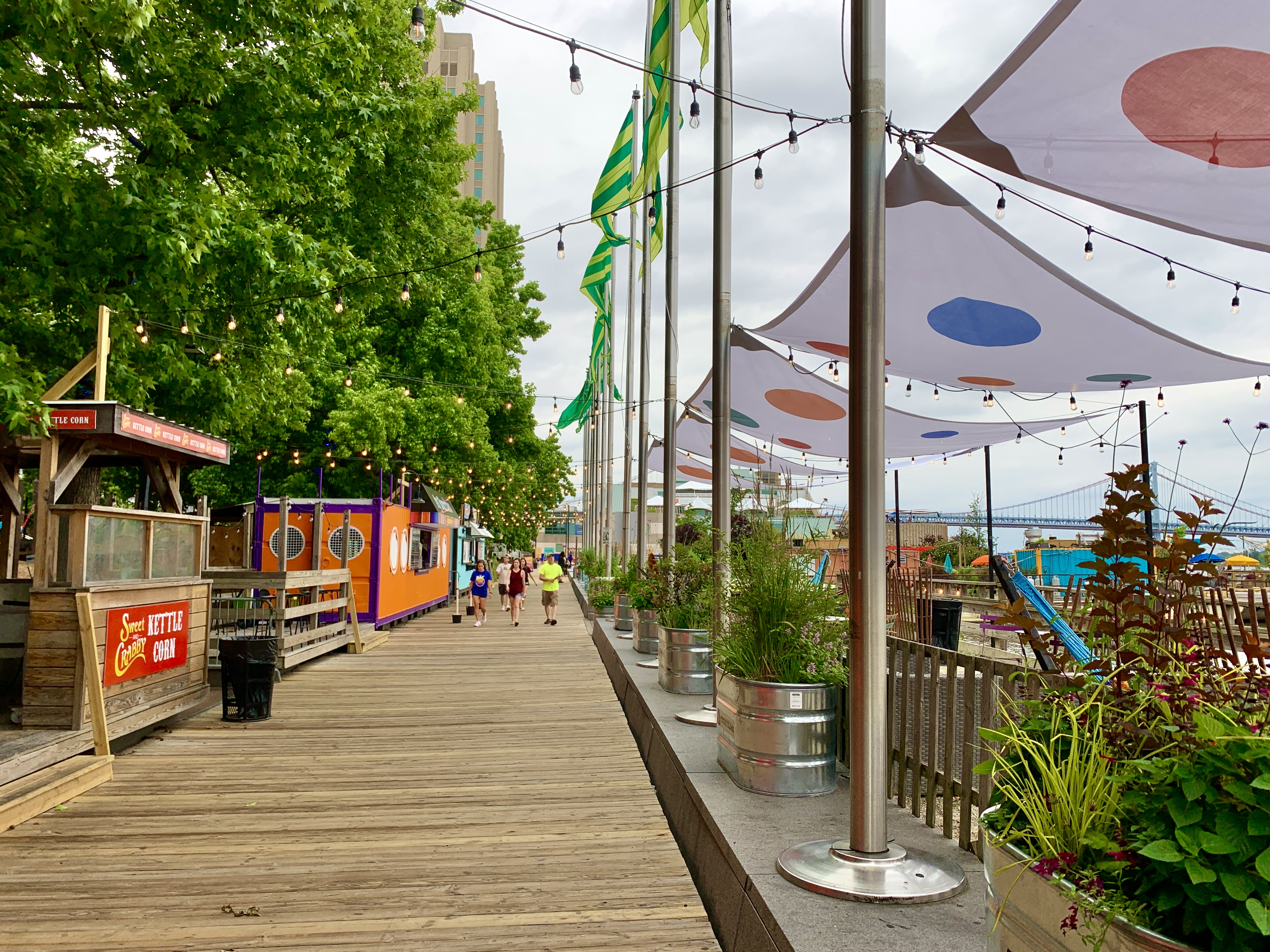
- Spruce Street Harbor Park in Philadelphia on June 16th, 2022
- Interactive map of Spruce Street Harbor Park
- Type: Urban
- Location: 301 S. Christopher Columbus Blvd., Philadelphia, Pennsylvania, U.S.
- Opened: 2014
- Visitors: 175,000 (2015)
- Status: Open during summer months only
- Website: Official website

The Spruce Street Harbor Park is an urban park at Penn's Landing in Philadelphia, Pennsylvania. Open during the summer, the park features a boardwalk along the Delaware River with a beachfront atmosphere. Fireworks were planned on Independence Day holiday on the Benjamin Franklin Parkway.

The park's features include a beachfront with a boardwalk along the Delaware River, restaurants, bars, about 100 hammocks, and thousands of LED lights hung in the trees. The park has hammock lounges and two barges available for reservation. On Saturdays, it is host to the Art Star Pop Up Market, where local artists sell candles, soaps, ceramics, art, home goods, jewelry and more.

== History ==
In 2014, Philadelphia inaugurated the first Harbor Park festival which was planned with beer gardens to start a new tradition they referred to as "Summer in the city".

== See also ==
- List of parks in Philadelphia
