= Rivers Casino (Pittsburgh) =

Casino in Pennsylvania, United States

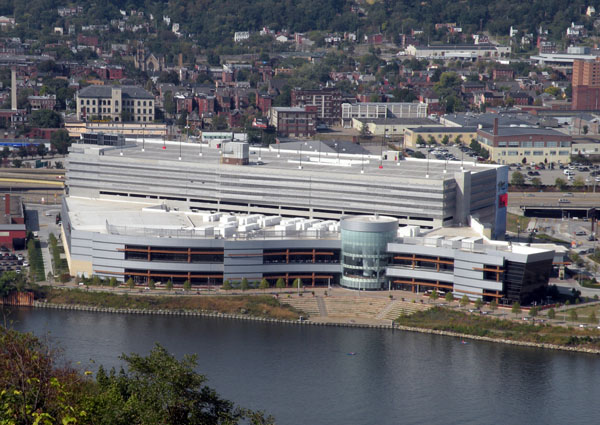
- Rivers Casino in September 2010

- Location of Rivers Casino in Pittsburgh and Pennsylvania Rivers Casino (Pittsburgh) (Pennsylvania) Rivers Casino (Pittsburgh) (the United States)
- Interactive map of Rivers Casino
- Location: Pittsburgh, Pennsylvania, U.S.; 777 Casino Drive Pittsburgh, Pennsylvania 15212; 40.447404°N 80.022697°W
- Opened: August 9, 2009
- Theme: Waterfront
- Notable restaurants: Grand View Buffet; Ciao; West End Cafe; Andrew's Steak & Seafood; The Wheelhouse
- Casino type: Land-Based
- Owner: Holdings Acquisition Co. L.P., Don H. Barden
- Previous names: The Majestic Star Pittsburgh
- Public transit access: Allegheny
- Website: riverscasino.com/pittsburgh

The Rivers Casino is a casino in Pittsburgh, Pennsylvania. It is owned by Holdings Acquisition Co. L.P., a joint venture of Walton Street Capital LLC and High Pitt Gaming LP. Located in Pittsburgh's Chateau neighborhood along the Ohio River, adjacent to the Kamin Science Center and nearby Acrisure Stadium and PNC Park, it had its groundbreaking in December 2007 and opened on August 9, 2009.

The casino was originally to be built by Don H. Barden, but financial troubles forced him to sell 75% of his interest in the casino to Holdings Acquisition Co on July 16, 2008. The casino has 3,000 slot machines.

== History ==
=== Application process ===
The "Pennsylvania Race Horse Development and Gaming Act" authorized the Pennsylvania Gaming Control Board to issue up to 17 casino licenses, with at least 1 casino license reserved for the City of Pittsburgh. Four organizations entered the proposal process to win the Pittsburgh casino license: North Shore Gaming, LP, Isle of Capri Casinos, Inc., Station Square Gaming, LP, and PITG Gaming, LLC. Pittsburgh Mayor Luke Ravenstahl and other local officials favored a deal from the Isle of Capri Casinos, Inc., which proposed to give the Pittsburgh Penguins $290 million to build a new arena in exchange for receiving the casino license.

In a "Plan B" negotiated by local political leaders, both the Majestic Star and Forest City agreed to pay $7.5 million a year for 30 years toward the construction of the new hockey arena. The Station Square proposal was backed by major casino players, including Harrah's Entertainment and Forest City Enterprises. In 2005, then-Mayor Tom Murphy controversially said during a press luncheon that "the fix is in" for Forest City's proposal. The proposed plan suffered from questions about increases in traffic in the already-developed Station Square location.

The proposal from PITG Gaming, LLC, a holding company owned by Don Barden's The Majestic Star Casino, LLC, was awarded one of five available "Category 2" slots licenses by the Pennsylvania Gaming Control Board on December 20, 2006. Barden's proposal was generally considered a "long-shot" for much of the application process because, unlike the competition, it lacked a large rewards program for gamblers and did not offer to pay for a replacement for the aging Mellon Arena. Local community groups expressed concern over its proposed North Side location, home to PNC Park and Heinz Field and the increase in traffic congestion.

Barden and PITG Gaming, LLC, were awarded the casino license in December 2006. Several lawsuits were filed by the losing applicants challenging the Gaming Board's decision, but they were not successful. Early construction delays were blamed on the suits.

=== Construction ===
Ground was broken on the casino's North Shore in December 2007. In July 2008, Barden defaulted on a $200 million bridge loan and failed to pay contractors, halting construction.

On July 16, 2008, he sold 75% of his interest to Holdings Acquisition Co, a joint venture of Walton Street Capital LLC and High Pitt Gaming LP and led by Neil Bluhm. The ownership changes were approved by the Gaming Board on August 14, 2008, and construction on the casino restarted. In November 2008, the new owners changed the casino's name to "Rivers Casino" to reflect its location near the confluence of the Allegheny, Monongahela and Ohio rivers.

=== Grand opening ===
The Rivers Casino opened as scheduled at noon on August 9, 2009.

=== Taxes ===
The Rivers Casino is reported to be worth $199.5 million to Allegheny County at least for taxing purposes. That's the assessed value the county has placed on the North Shore riverfront venue for the 2010 tax year. The value was calculated based on construction costs of the casino and surrounding parcels. The $199.5 million assessed value is the largest on any commercial property in Allegheny County and the largest on any casino in Pennsylvania. According to Allegheny County real estate records, "The Steel Building" located at 600 Grant St. 15219, the tallest building in Pittsburgh, is valued at $175 Million. Barring an appeal, it will produce $935,655 in property tax revenue for the county, $2.77 million for city schools, and $2.15 million for the city. The casino, the school district, and the city all have the right to appeal the value if they so choose.

=== Management ===
In January 2018, it was announced that long-running general manager, Craig Clark, would be succeeded by Bill Keena. Keena was previously the general manager of the Rivers Casino (Des Plaines) and has been in the casino industry for over 30 years. Recently, it inked a deal with BetRivers.com

== Dining and entertainment ==
Rivers Casino has four restaurants: The Wheelhouse, Flipt Burgers & Shakes, Martorano's Prime, and Mian. The casino also previously had a buffet, but it closed in 2020 due to the COVID-19 pandemic. It also has three bars: Spiral Bar, Drum Bar and Wheelhouse. In the fall of 2009, the casino opened a coat room, open till 6pm Sunday through Thursday and until 2 am closing time on Fridays and Saturdays. The casino also has a night club and a 1,000 seat outdoor amphitheater.

== Rewards club ==
Rivers Casino offers a rewards club, the Rush Rewards Players Club. It has various rewards based on play level. Some rewards include: free slot play, free monthly gifts, and free/discounted food offers.

== Table games ==
Table games opened to the general public in July 2010.

As table games have succeeded financially, management officials announced plans in January 2011 to add several additional table games: by Spring 2011 Rivers Casino will have a total of 107 games. The Casino also added a $2 million ballroom in a massive 15,000-square-foot (1,400 m^{2}) corner space on the second floor, with views of the riverfront and Downtown skyline. It was completed in October 2011. As of 2018, Rivers Casino includes a 30-table non-smoking poker room.

== Sports betting ==
On December 13, 2018, sports betting began at Rivers Casino with a two-day test period; official sports betting began on December 15, 2018. Rivers Casino began online sports betting on June 25, 2019. On September 29, 2019, Rivers Casino opened the permanent 5,500-square-foot (510 m^{2}) BetRivers Sportsbook, which contains two 50 by 7 feet (15.2 m × 2.1 m) LED monitors, 24 flat-screen HD monitors, six betting windows, and 33 self-serve kiosks. Rivers Casino offers sports betting on various sports including baseball, football, basketball, hockey, and boxing.

== Banned players ==
Rivers Casino abides by Pennsylvania State Law that allows any patron of the casino to put themselves on a "Do Not Play" list via the iGaming Self-Exclusion program. If a patron on the list enters the casino, they can be prosecuted for trespassing.

Rivers Casino has also banned numerous players for cheating, as well as conspiracy to cheat.

== See also ==
- List of casino hotels
- List of casinos in Pennsylvania
- List of casinos in the United States
