= Foxwoods Casino Philadelphia =

- Location: Philadelphia, PA (United States); The Gallery at Market East Philadelphia, PA
- Casino type: Land-Based
- Website: www.foxwoods.com

Foxwoods Casino Philadelphia was a proposed casino to be located first along the Delaware River, then under pressure from local residents attempted to move to The Gallery at Market East in Center City in Philadelphia, Pennsylvania. It was one of five stand-alone casinos awarded a gaming license on December 20, 2006, by the Pennsylvania Gaming Control Board. The Board revoked the license in December 2010.

== History ==
Originally, it was planned to be located along the Delaware River in South Philadelphia. It was to be built on a 16.5-acre (67,000 m^{2}) site between Tasker and Reed Streets that was to include 3,000 Slot machines, an 1,800 seat showroom, a 4,500 space parking garage, and future expansion to a casino with 5,000 slot machines and a 500-room hotel.

In September 2008, residents opposed to the development forced the developers of the Foxwoods Casino to move proposal to The Gallery at Market East. This proposal was endorsed by both Mayor Michael Nutter and Governor Ed Rendell but was opposed by local residents. The original proposal for the Foxwoods Casino at The Gallery at Market East was for a 3,000 slot machine casino on two floors currently occupied by Burlington Coat Factory, forcing that store to relocate.

On February 26, 2009, it was announced that the developers were looking into locating their new casino onto three floors of the former Strawbridge's flagship store, which was vacant and owned by the PREIT, the owners of The Gallery.

The difficulties Foxwoods has faced in Philadelphia also highlight the challenges of building an urban casino. Casino companies, for the most part, have avoided such plays in the US, sticking to less controversial rural, suburban or riverboat locations, industry observers say. Casino developers almost always face complaints about traffic and the impact on nearby residential areas wherever they build, but such concerns become particularly intense amid densely packed city neighborhoods.

The Control Board started to threaten that they would revoke the license. In February 2010, Steve Wynn was brought in as the managing partner of the project. The location was returned to its original Waterfront site, and Wynn said that there would be no hotel built on the location. However, on April 8, 2010, Wynn announced that his company was withdrawing from the project, three days after presenting plans for the Foxwoods site to the Pennsylvania Gaming Control Board. On October 26, 2010, Harrah's Entertainment (pending signing final agreement) announced they would buy a one-third stake and be in charge of operations in the casino.

On December 16, 2010, the Gaming Control Board voted to revoke the casino's license in a 6 to 1 vote after the venture failed to secure funding.

== See also ==
- List of casinos in Pennsylvania
- List of casinos in the United States
- List of casino hotels
