= Rutter's =

American convenience store chain

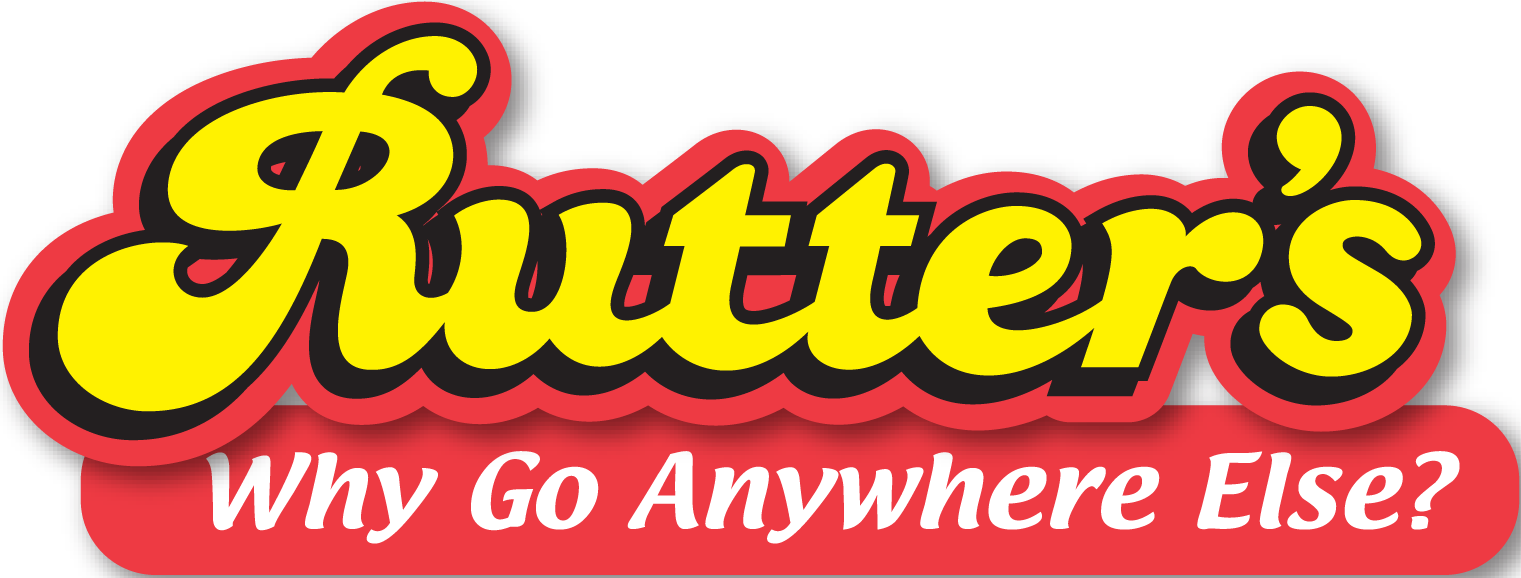
- Type: Private
- Industry: Convenience store; fast food; gas station
- Founded: 1968; 58 years ago (as Rutter's Farm Stores)
- Founders: Conrad Rutter; Jane Rutter
- Headquarters: York, Pennsylvania, U.S.
- Number of locations: 94 stores (2026)
- Area served: Pennsylvania, Maryland, Virginia, West Virginia
- Key people: Scott Hartman, President & CEO
- Products: Prepared food; beverages; fuel
- Brands: 1747 Bar & Lounge
- Owner: CHR Corporation; Rutter's Holdings, Inc.
- Website: rutters.com

Rutter's is an American chain of convenience stores and gas stations with 94 locations in Eastern, Central and Western Pennsylvania, the Eastern Panhandle of West Virginia, eastern Virginia, and central Maryland. Stores are open 24 hours a day and have a made-to-order food counter, staffed around the clock.

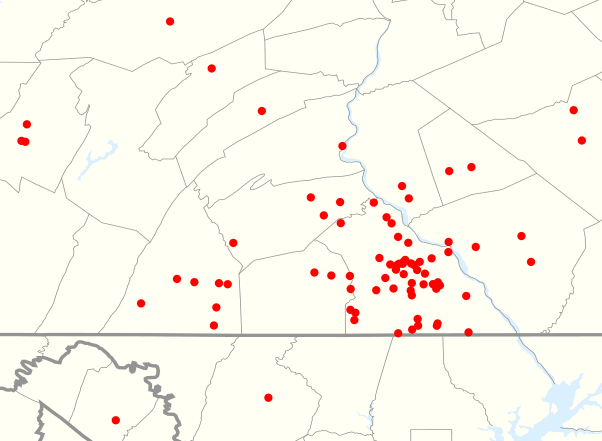
Map of Rutter's convenience store locations, as of February 2021.

== History ==
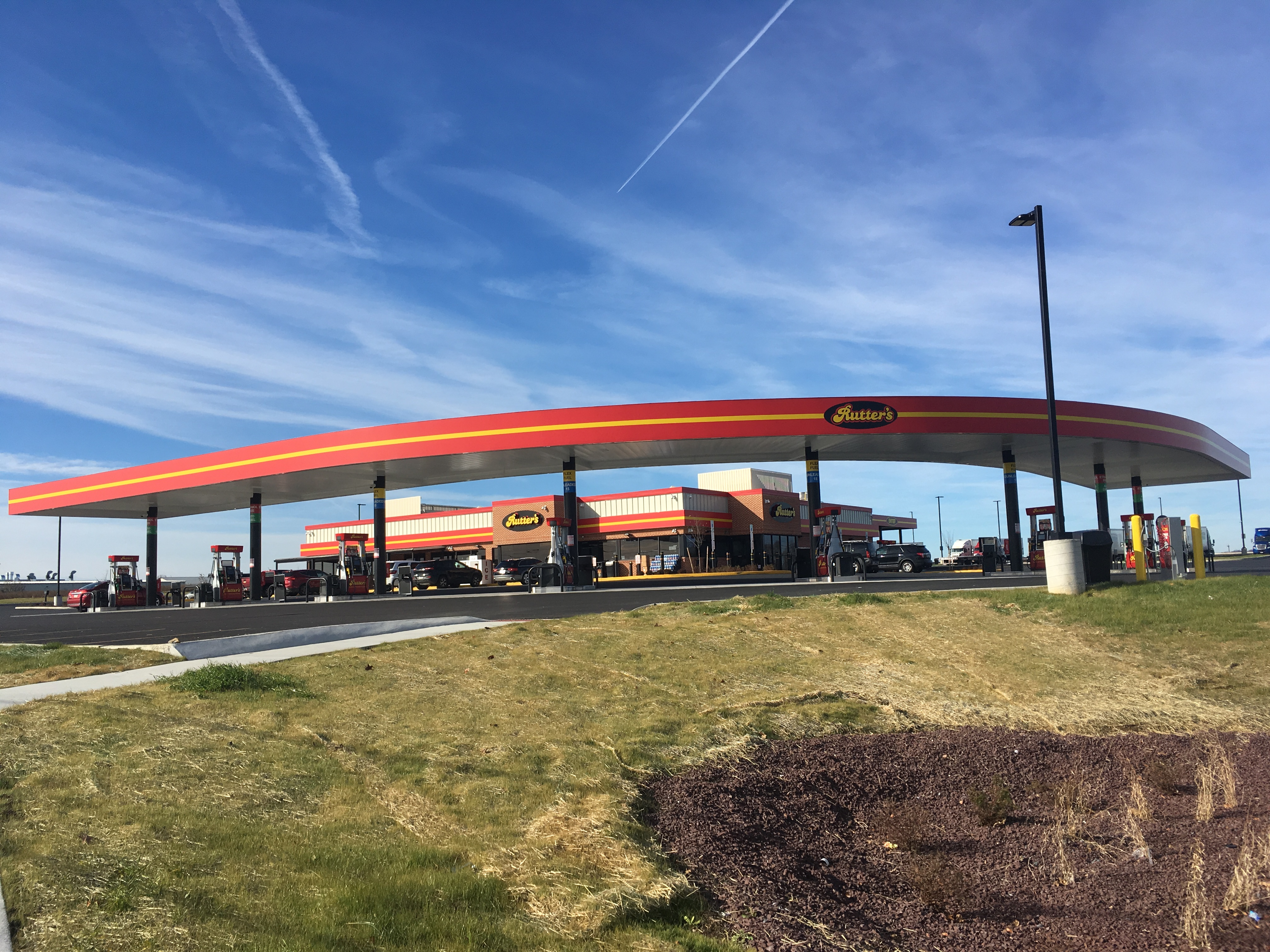
Rutter's location in Leesport, Pennsylvania

The company began agricultural operations in 1747 at the family farm in York, Pennsylvania. In 1921, Georgia and Bud Rutter started a diary business delivering milk door-to-door from horse drawn wagons. The first Rutter's Farm Stores opened on February 22, 1968. In 2018, during the 50th anniversary of its first convenience store, Rutter's officially dropped "Farm Stores" from its name. The first location outside of Pennsylvania opened on May 30, 2018 in Inwood, West Virginia. On January 15, 2019, Rutter's opened its first Maryland location in Walkersville.

On February 13, 2020, Rutter's announced that a data breach had occurred at its locations between October 1, 2018 and May 29, 2019, with malware installed on payment systems inside the store and at the gas pumps.

In 2025, Rutter's opened its first location in Virginia in Winchester, Virginia, expanding the company's operating footprint beyond Pennsylvania, Maryland and West Virginia. The company had announced plans to open approximately 50 additional stores over five years, with expansion planned across Pennsylvania, Maryland, West Virginia, Virginia and Delaware. The expansion plan included additional Pennsylvania locations outside Central Pennsylvania, including markets extending toward Philadelphia and Pittsburgh and north of Altoona, as well as new locations in Maryland, West Virginia, Virginia and Delaware.

Also in 2025, Rutter's introduced the 1747 Bar & Lounge, a sports-bar-style concept incorporated into select Rutter's stores. The concept debuted at locations in Johnstown and Milton, Pennsylvania, and includes alcoholic beverages, foodservice, large-screen televisions, sports programming, events and video gaming terminals. The concept was subsequently introduced at additional Rutter's locations.

In November 2025, Rutter's #106 in Milton, Pennsylvania, was named the winner of Global Convenience's 2025 Best Foodvenience Store in the World competition. The nearly 14,000-square-foot location was recognized for its foodservice operations, customer experience and combination of convenience retail, foodservice, a bar and gaming lounge. The award attracted entries from 14 countries, with 12 locations selected as finalists. Rutter's became the first U.S. retailer to win the competition.

On January 13, 2026, Rutter's opened its 93rd location in Ruffs Dale, Pennsylvania. The store, located off Interstate 70, features foodservice, fuel, beer and wine, video gaming terminals and a 1747 Bar & Lounge. The move into Western Pennsylvania put Rutter's head-to-head with GetGo and Circle K for the first time as well as existing competitors Sheetz and 7-Eleven/Speedway; all except Circle K have a strong presence in Greater Pittsburgh.

== Food service ==
Rutter's is known for its Made For You foodservice, which includes subs and wraps, burgers, seafood, salads, Mexican-inspired food, bowls, pizza, pasta, chicken and breakfast sandwiches. The company's 1747 Bar & Lounge locations incorporate the Made For You food menu alongside an expanded bar program.

In March 2023, Rutter's introduced online food ordering through its website and mobile application. The service allowed Rutter's Rewards members to order from the company's foodservice menu in advance and pick up their orders in-store, either immediately or at a scheduled time. The online ordering system was developed in partnership with Paytronix using its Order & Delivery platform.

== Alcohol sales ==
Several Rutter's locations in Central Pennsylvania along with the Inwood, West Virginia location sell beer and wine. The Inwood, West Virginia location also sells liquor; liquor cannot be sold at its Pennsylvania locations as all liquor in Pennsylvania must be sold at state-owned Fine Wine & Good Spirits stores. Locations selling alcohol also feature a seating area. Rutter's has been rapidly adding Beer Caves to its Pennsylvania locations since Act 39 in 2016 allowed for additional alcohol licenses in Pennsylvania.

Rutter's adult beverage program also includes canned cocktails and spiked slushies at select locations. The company's 1747 Bar & Lounge locations offer an expanded selection of alcoholic beverages, including beer, wine and cocktails.

== Video gaming rooms ==
Following the 2017 passage of a Pennsylvania law that allows up to five video gaming terminals to be located at "truck stop establishments", Rutter's and Penn National Gaming opened the first video gaming room at the Rutter's location in Manchester Township in York County in August 2019. There are plans to open video gaming rooms at more Rutter's locations in 2019 and 2020.

Rutter's subsequently expanded its video gaming operations to additional locations within Pennsylvania. The company's 1747 Bar & Lounge concept incorporates video gaming terminals alongside its bar and sports-viewing areas.

== Rutter's Beverage Company ==
Rutter's Beverage Company sells products throughout Pennsylvania, Maryland, New Jersey, and West Virginia.
