= J. Leon Altemose =

American developer and contractor

James Leon Altemose (August 21, 1939 – April 11, 2008) was an American developer and contractor, active in the Valley Forge, Pennsylvania area in the late 20th century. Altemose is known for disputes over his use of non-union employees on a construction project to build Valley Forge Plaza, which eventually became part of the Valley Forge Convention Center.

== Dispute over construction of Valley Forge Plaza ==
Altemose owned a construction company he started in 1961 and believed that employees should have the right to choose if they wanted to belong to a trade union. Altemose won an $18-million construction contract in 1972 for a 24-acre hotel, office and retail complex to be built in the suburbs of Philadelphia. Altemose wanted to employ at least a portion of trade employees as non-union. This led to disputes and protests by union supporters.

A thousand construction workers arrived at the construction site at dawn on June 5, 1972 in cars and buses chartered by Roofers Local Union No. 30. More than $300,000 of property damaged occurred, including firebombing of equipment and construction trailers. Fire trucks were not allowed to respond because of the chaos at the site. The destruction would continue until midday when the state police arrived in riot gear. On August 17, 1972, Altemose was assaulted by two dozen men in downtown Philadelphia. The protests were estimated to have cost Altemose more than $2 million. They would delay, but not halt, the completion of construction as the hotel would eventually open in September 1973.

== Bankruptcy ==
Altemose obtained private financing after five years of effort and built the Valley Forge Convention Center. He planned to operate it without a public subsidy, a rare occurrence in the United States. It opened in 1985, and by 1988 Altemose had concluded that the convention center could not survive under private ownership. His development company would file for bankruptcy in March 1989 and he would file for personal bankruptcy in May 1990.

== Awards ==
Altemose received the Award of Excellence in 1973 from Engineering News-Record for his work for the right of contractors to work open shop. The cover of the February 15, 1973 ENR magazine announcing the award showed Altemose and his armed bodyguard.
