= Valley Forge Casino Resort =

Casino in Pennsylvania, United States

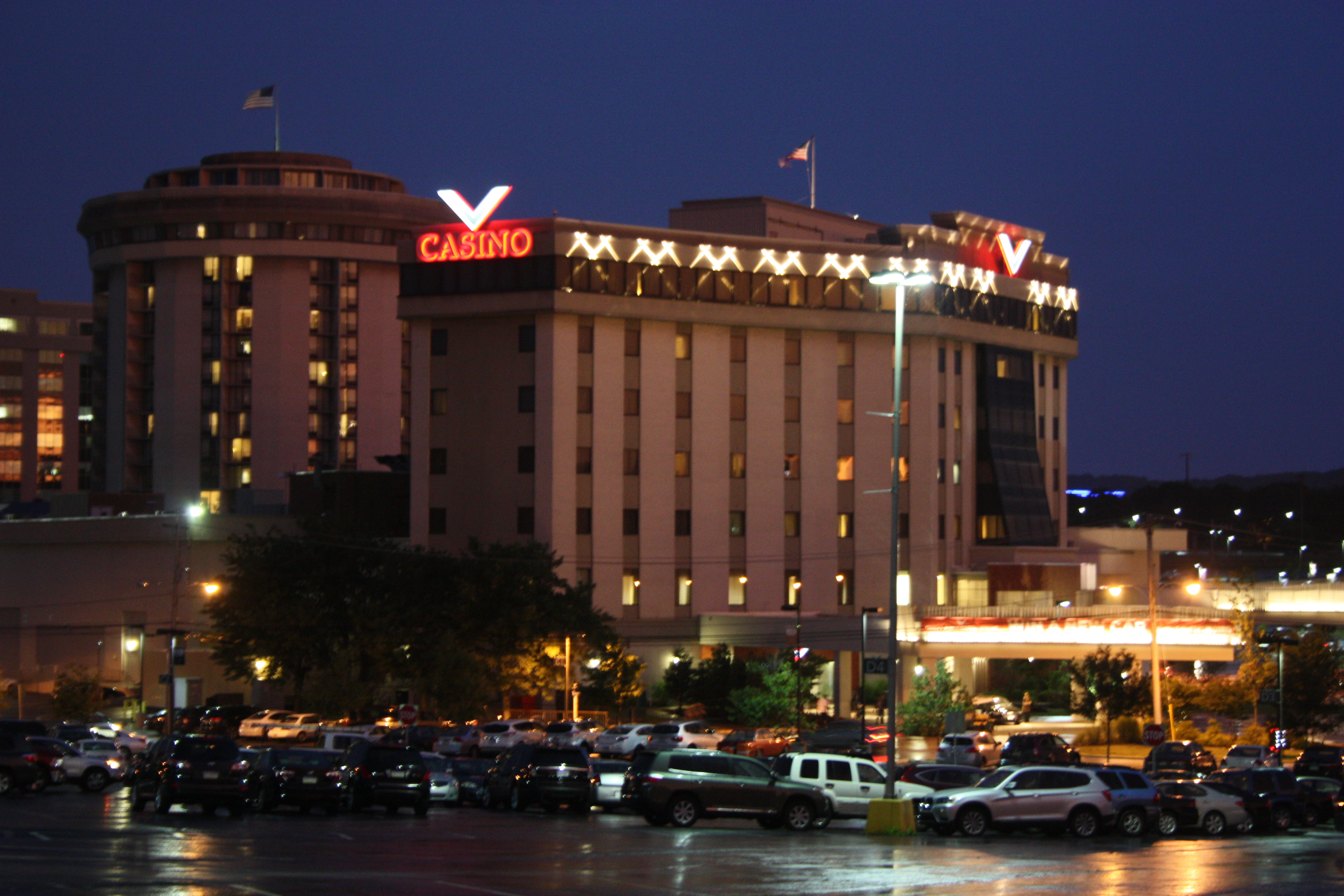
- Valley Forge Casino Resort in July 2014

- Location of Valley Forge Casino Resort in Pennsylvania Valley Forge Casino Resort (the United States)
- Interactive map of Valley Forge Casino Resort
- Location: King of Prussia, Pennsylvania, U.S.; 1160 First Ave, King of Prussia, PA, U.S.; 40.09713°N 75.416851°W
- Opened: March 31, 2012
- No. of rooms: 486
- Gaming space: 40,000 sq ft (3,700 m^{2})
- Notable restaurants: Pacific Prime; Viviano
- Casino type: Land-based
- Owner: Boyd Gaming
- Architect: TN Ward
- Website: Valley Forge Casino Resort

Valley Forge Casino Resort is a casino in King of Prussia, Pennsylvania. It was constructed on the existing site of the Valley Forge Convention Center and opened on March 31, 2012. It is owned and operated by Boyd Gaming.

== History ==
=== Valley Forge Plaza ===
The casino complex originated as a mixed-use development called Valley Forge Plaza, constructed by developer J. Leon Altemose. The construction was highly controversial, because Altemose chose to use non-union workers. This led to protests by local union members, during one of which, on June 5, 1972, the construction site was firebombed. The first structures in the complex were the circular tower of the Sheraton-Valley Forge Hotel, an adjoining twin-screen cinema, and the connected curved executive office tower directly to the east, which opened in September 1973.

In 1985, Altemose constructed an enormous addition on the west side, which included the Valley Forge Convention and Exhibition Center along with a second hotel tower (which added 160 rooms to the Sheraton). The convention center was a 130,000 square feet (12,000 m^{2}) facility, which had the capacity to regularly host events with as many as 10,000 daily attendees. Among the events the venue was utilized for in its years of operation was the 1996 Reform National Convention and the 2004 Constitution National Convention.

In 1989, the newer western Sheraton hotel tower was converted to a separate hotel, the Radisson Hotel/Valley Forge. In 1992, the Radisson Hotel/Valley Forge was converted to a second Sheraton hotel within the complex, the Sheraton Plaza Hotel. In 1997, the Sheraton Plaza Hotel was merged back into the Sheraton Valley Forge Hotel. In September 1999, the Sheraton Valley Forge was converted to the Radisson Valley Forge Hotel. The western hotel tower was soon after converted to the Scanticon Valley Forge Hotel.

=== Casino conversion ===
In 2012, the complex was converted to the Valley Forge Casino Resort, and the Scanticon Valley Forge Hotel was converted to the Casino Tower wing of the resort, while the Radisson continued operating adjoining it. On March 31, 2012, Valley Forge Casino Resort became the 11th casino to operate in Pennsylvania. Back in 2009, rival casino Parx opposed the casino and challenged them in court, claiming that they did not meet the resort license requirements. The Supreme Court of Pennsylvania ruled in favor of the Valley Forge Casino.

The casino is the first in the state of Pennsylvania to be granted the Category 3 license by the Pennsylvania Gaming Control Board. This type of license means the casino is intended to support the existing resort property, limits the number of table games and slots available, and has requirements for access to the gaming floor. A Category 3 license also requires that anyone who wishes to gamble in the casino must either spend at least $10 elsewhere in the resort each visit or purchase a membership. The $10 minimum was eliminated on October 27, 2017, with passage of new legislation. The casino currently is at the maximum number of slot machines, 600, and table games, 50, that is allowed at resort casinos. The casino has the option to add 15 tables for monthly poker or blackjack tournaments.

The casino was built for $130 million over the exhibition floor of the Valley Forge Convention Center. The convention center was built by J. Leon Altemose in 1985.

In 2018, Boyd Gaming purchased the property for $281 million.

On March 11, 2019, Valley Forge Casino Resort began offering sports betting at a sportsbook called the FanDuel Sportsbook at Valley Forge Casino Resort with a two-day soft opening. An official opening for the sportsbook occurred on March 13, 2019, with former Philadelphia Eagles tight end Brent Celek in attendance to place the first bet. The FanDuel online sportsbook launched on July 29, 2019.

In 2020, the Radisson Valley Forge Hotel was converted to the Valley Tower wing of the resort.

== Overview ==
Valley Forge Casino Resort consists of 850 slot machines and 50 table games including Blackjack, Super 4 Blackjack, Craps, MiniBaccarat, Roulette, Spanish 21, Pai Gow, Pai Gow Poker, Three-Card Poker, Ultimate Texas Hold 'Em, and other assorted high limit table games. The casino is also home to the FanDuel Sportsbook at Valley Forge Casino Resort, a sportsbook offering sports betting.

The Valley Forge Casino Resort has two hotel towers: the Casino Tower (formerly the Scanticon Valley Forge Hotel) and the stardust tower (formerly the Valley Tower) (formerly the Radisson Valley Forge Hotel, originally the Sheraton Valley Forge Hotel), together offering 486 hotel rooms and suites. The Valley Forge Casino Resort has over 100,000 sq ft (9,300 m^{2}) of meeting, convention and exhibit space including the Valley Forge Convention Center. The complex also includes a spa, fitness center, and two stores (Valley Shop and Valley Style). The parking lot can accommodate 3,000 vehicles and has free valet parking every day.

== Dining ==
- Revolution Chophouse
- Valley Tavern
- Copper Whisk

=== Nightlife ===
- The Vault
- Revolution Chophouse
- Center Bar
- Valley Tavern
- Valley Beach Pool Side Club (open seasonally)

== See also ==
- List of casinos in Pennsylvania
- List of casinos in the United States
- List of casino hotels
