= Grantville, Pennsylvania =

Unincorporated community in Pennsylvania, US

- Unincorporated community
- Location within the U.S. state of Pennsylvania Grantville (the United States)
- Coordinates: 40°22′40″N 76°38′50″W
- Country: United States
- State: Pennsylvania
- County: Dauphin
- Township: East Hanover
- Time zone: UTC-5 (Eastern (EST))
  - Summer (DST): UTC-4 (EDT)
- ZIP codes: 17028
- Area code: 717

Grantville is an unincorporated community in East Hanover Township, Dauphin County, Pennsylvania, United States. It is part of the Harrisburg metropolitan area.

== Points of interest ==
- Hollywood Casino at Penn National Race Course
- Monocoupe Aeroplane and Engine Corporation
- Monocoupe Aircraft
- St. John's United Methodist Church, Grantville

== Notable people ==
- Walter F. Pudlowski Jr., US Army major general

== See also ==
- Manada Hill, Pennsylvania
- Shellsville, Pennsylvania
