= Racino =

Combined casino and horse racing venue

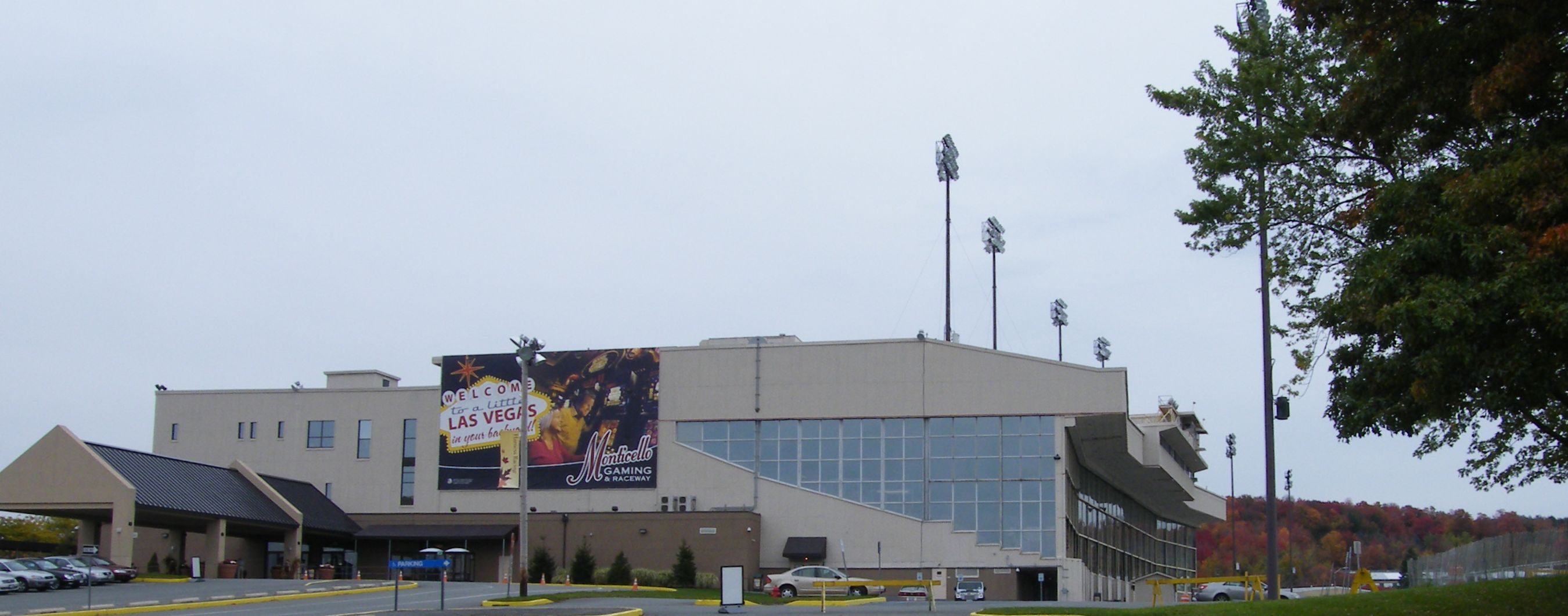
Monticello Raceway in New York where the casino has been incorporated into the grandstand

A racino is a combined horse racing track, or other live parimutuel betting facility, and casino. In some cases, the casino gambling is limited to slot machines or video lottery terminals, but many locations also offer table games such as blackjack, poker, and roulette. As of the end of 2023, there were approximately 50 racinos operating in the United States. Racinos operate in other countries, including Canada and France, as well.

== History in the United States ==
Beginning in the late 1970s, the popularity of horse racing began to decline in the United States, as evidenced by the inflation-adjusted decline in wagering by 52 percent from a peak in 1977 through 2006. This decline in wagering occurred despite efforts to increase parimutuel wagering through initiatives such as off-track betting and advance-deposit wagering. The decline is generally attributed to the introduction and growth of casino gambling and lottery gaming.

In 1990, West Virginia authorized the installation of several hundred video lottery terminals at Mountaineer Park as part of a pilot program that eventually became law in 1994.

In 1992, in response to the opening of the Foxwoods Native American casino nearby in Connecticut, the Rhode Island legislature passed a bill permitting electronic gaming devices at the state's two parimutuel wagering venues, Lincoln Greyhound Park and Newport Jai Alai.

An early success story was the mid-1990s turnaround of the Prairie Meadows racetrack in Polk County, Iowa. Prairie Meadows, which opened in 1989 but went bankrupt by 1991, was bought by the county government in 1993. As reported in a January 2003 study for the Massachusetts State Lottery Commission:

In 1994, Iowa voters authorized slot machines at Iowa racetracks (including Greyhound tracks). Polk County spent an additional $26 million to convert the Prairie Meadows clubhouse into a casino and install 1,100 slot machines. On April 1, 1995 the slot casino (or "racino") opened for business. In the 12 months ended March 31, 1996 machine revenues totaled $119.3 million, enabling Polk County to pay off the $27 million bond issue that paid for the clubhouse casino conversion within that initial year and retire the track's initial $38.8 million bond issue 17 years early.

Other states followed suit. Delaware authorized racinos in 1994, and Louisiana and New Mexico in 1997. A number of larger states also enacted enabling legislation, including New York in 2001, Florida and Pennsylvania in 2004, and Ohio in 2011. Most recently, Illinois and Nebraska authorized race tracks to seek casino licenses, in 2019 and 2021 respectively. Some states, notably Massachusetts and Maryland, have declined to specifically designate race tracks as casino locations but nonetheless have awarded casino licenses to race tracks through open competitive bidding processes.

Some other states have declined to authorize casino gambling within their states but have authorized race tracks to offer historical horse racing machines, which are similar in appearance to slot machines but which award prizes based on the results of old horse races. This style of gambling was first introduced at Oaklawn Park in Arkansas in 2000. Arkansas race tracks were subsequently authorized to offer casino gambling, however, several state, including Kentucky and Virginia, still offer this style of gambling at race tracks.

In some states, certain racinos have been permitted to discontinue live racing and still been permitted to continue their casino operations. Many of these are former greyhound tracks that have closed as a result of public sentiment turning against the sport on animal welfare grounds. Only two greyhound tracks continue to operate in the United States, both of which are racinos in West Virginia.

Today there are approximately 50 racinos operating in 17 U.S. states, not including any tracks offering historical horse racing machines. In 2023, the number one commercial casino in the United States outside of Nevada was a racino, Resorts World New York City located at Aqueduct Racetrack, with approximately $950 million in casino gaming revenue. Four other racinos were also in the top 20, as were two former greyhound racing facilities.

== Types of racinos ==
- Slot Machines: The most common gaming feature in racinos.
- Video Lottery Terminals (VLTs): Electronic gaming machines connected to a central system.
- Table Games: In some cases, racinos may include table games like blackjack, poker, or roulette, depending on local laws.
- Betting Facilities: Allowing wagers on live or simulcast races.

Racinos are often used to help revive struggling racetracks by drawing in additional revenue from casino gaming. They provide a mix of entertainment, from gaming to dining, and sometimes even live performances.

For instance, a study on the economic and tax revenue impacts of racino gaming in Texas estimated that implementing racinos could contribute just under $1 billion annually to the state.
