= Pennsylvania Gaming Control Board =

Agency of the Pennsylvania state government

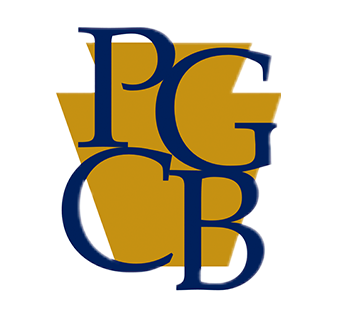

Agency overview
- Formed: 2004
- Jurisdiction: Pennsylvania
- Headquarters: 303 Walnut Street, 2nd Floor, Strawberry Square, Harrisburg, Pennsylvania, 17101
- Agency executives: Denise Smyler, Chair; Kevin F. O'Toole, Executive Director
- Website: gamingcontrolboard.pa.gov

The Pennsylvania Gaming Control Board is a governmental agency of the Commonwealth of Pennsylvania, founded in 2004 as the state licensing and the regulatory agency responsible for overseeing slot machines and casino gambling in the state.

The first completely new agency created in Pennsylvania in over 30 years, the PGCB administers the Pennsylvania Race Horse Development and Gaming Act, also known as "Act 71", and its regulations to assure public trust and confidence in the credibility and integrity of casinos in Pennsylvania. The Board also acts to fulfill "the objectives of limited gaming in the Commonwealth to deliver a significant source of revenue, assist the horse racing industry, provide broad economic opportunities, and enhance tourism."

The PGCB does not oversee games of chance in the Commonwealth such as the Pennsylvania Lottery or other permitted games of chance at clubs and non-profit organizations.

In December 2020, Pennsylvania became the first state to use a self-exclusion tool for online gamblers. In Pennsylvania, about 200,000 gamblers have had problem gaming issues.

== Composition ==
The board consists of seven voting members, three of which are appointed by the Governor of Pennsylvania and four of which are appointed by the leadership of the Pennsylvania General Assembly. By statute, the State Treasurer, Secretary of Revenue, and Secretary of Agriculture are non-voting ex officio members.

Former commissioner Merritt C. Reitzel was appointed by Senator Joe Scarnati for a two-year term in 2017 and was re-appointed in 2019.

=== Notable board members ===
- Jeffrey Coy (2004–2006)
- Gregory Fajt (Chairman, 2009–2011)
- Richard G. Jewell
- Keith R. McCall
- William H. Ryan, Jr. (Chairman, 2011–2015)
- Gary Allan Sojka

== Duties ==
Among other duties, the Board operates a slot-machine testing laboratory. Located in the Board's Harrisburg office, the laboratory was established in September 2008. Board employees at the lab test various models of slot machines against regulations.

The PGCB also set up an Office of Compulsive and Problem Gambling devoted to "understanding and alleviating the devastating effects of pathological gambling." Under PGCB's regulations, gambling facilities in the state must submit and have approved a compulsive-and-problem-gambling plan before starting gambling operations. These plans must include items such as employee training when dealing with compulsive gamblers, self-exclusion plans and how to handle people who want to be on Pennsylvania's self-exclusion list, the responsibility of patrons with respect to responsible gambling, the availability of printed material and signage throughout the casino, and procedures to prevent intoxicated and underage gambling.

== Funding and support ==
The PGCB's funding is from several sources, none directly from taxpayers. The largest funding mechanism is from slot machine revenues, but only after deduction of appropriate taxes that are transferred to a number of recipients:

- the local and county governments that host a facility
- the horse racing industry
- economic development and tourism efforts, and
- a State Gaming Fund which primarily provides revenues to school districts which, in turn, use toward the lowering of local property taxes.

In addition, the PGCB bills applicants for investigative costs associated with securing any type of license and manufacturers of slot machines and related goods who seek approval of equipment to be used in casinos.

The Gaming Act also requires a role in gaming oversight by the State Police, Department of Revenue and Attorney General, whose costs are also reimbursed from slot machine revenues.

== See also ==
- Gambling in Pennsylvania
- List of Pennsylvania state agencies
- List of casinos in Pennsylvania
