= Gambling in New Hampshire =

Types and locations of gambling allowed in the U.S. state of New Hampshire

Legal forms of gambling in the U.S. state of New Hampshire include the New Hampshire Lottery, sports betting, parimutuel wagering, and charitable gaming. The state's Gaming Regulatory Oversight Authority (GROA) is part of the New Hampshire Lottery Commission, which also maintains an Investigative & Compliance Division.

== Lottery ==
Initially known as the New Hampshire Sweepstakes, the state's lottery began operation in 1964 and is the oldest lottery conducted by a U.S. state. (Note: Legal lotteries in the U.S. territories of Puerto Rico and the U.S. Virgin Islands were established in the 1930s.) New Hampshire offers scratch tickets and participates in multi-state lotteries such as Mega Millions and Powerball. Online sales began in September 2018.

== Sports betting ==
Sports betting is offered in the state exclusively by DraftKings, on behalf of the New Hampshire Lottery. DraftKings accepts wagers online and through self-serve kiosks at four retail sportsbooks, located in Dover, Manchester, Seabrook, and Nashua, New Hampshire.

Sports betting was legalized by the state in 2019. DraftKings was granted its exclusive contract later that year for a six-year period, based on its offer to give 51% of online revenue and 50% of retail revenue to the state. The first bet was placed on December 30, 2019, by Governor Chris Sununu.

== Parimutuel wagering ==
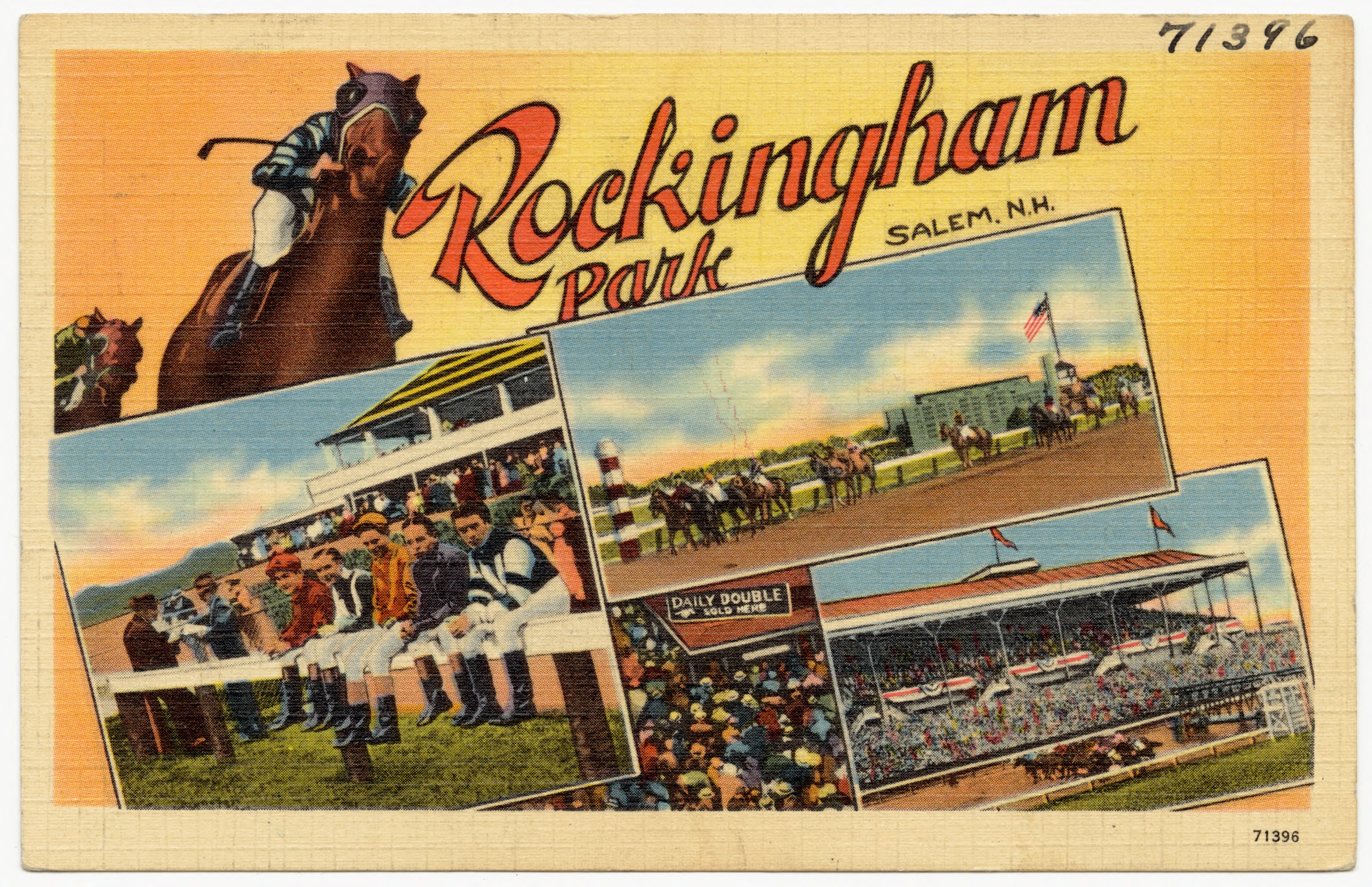
A postcard of Rockingham Park

The state allows parimutuel wagering on horse racing and greyhound racing. However, there are currently no active tracks in the state.

Rockingham Park, a horse racing facility in Salem, operated from 1906 until 2009. Dog racing took place at several venues, including Hinsdale Greyhound Park, which closed in 2008, and Seabrook Greyhound Park, which ended live racing in 2009.

Former racetrack sites can offer off-track betting; as of 2023, only the former Seabrook Greyhound Park, now operating as The Brook, does so.

== Charitable gaming ==
Charitable gaming allowed in the state includes poker, bingo, Lucky 7 pull-tab tickets, and raffles. Groups wishing to run charitable gaming events must be registered with the state. Starting in 2006, for-profit companies were allowed to run charitable gambling locations.

In 2021, New Hampshire legalized Instant Racing (also known as historical horse racing) at charitable gaming facilities.

== Casinos ==
New Hampshire has no commercial casinos. Several facilities that brand themselves as casinos operate under the state's charitable gaming laws, donating a portion of daily proceeds to local nonprofit organizations. One such facility operates table games including Spanish 21 and roulette, poker tables, and historical horse racing machines. A similar facility donated over $4 million in 10 years to a local American Legion post.

As New Hampshire has no federally recognized tribes, the state has no Native American gaming (colloquially known as "Indian casinos").

== See also ==
- Gambling in the United States
- List of casinos in the United States
