= Gambling in the United States =

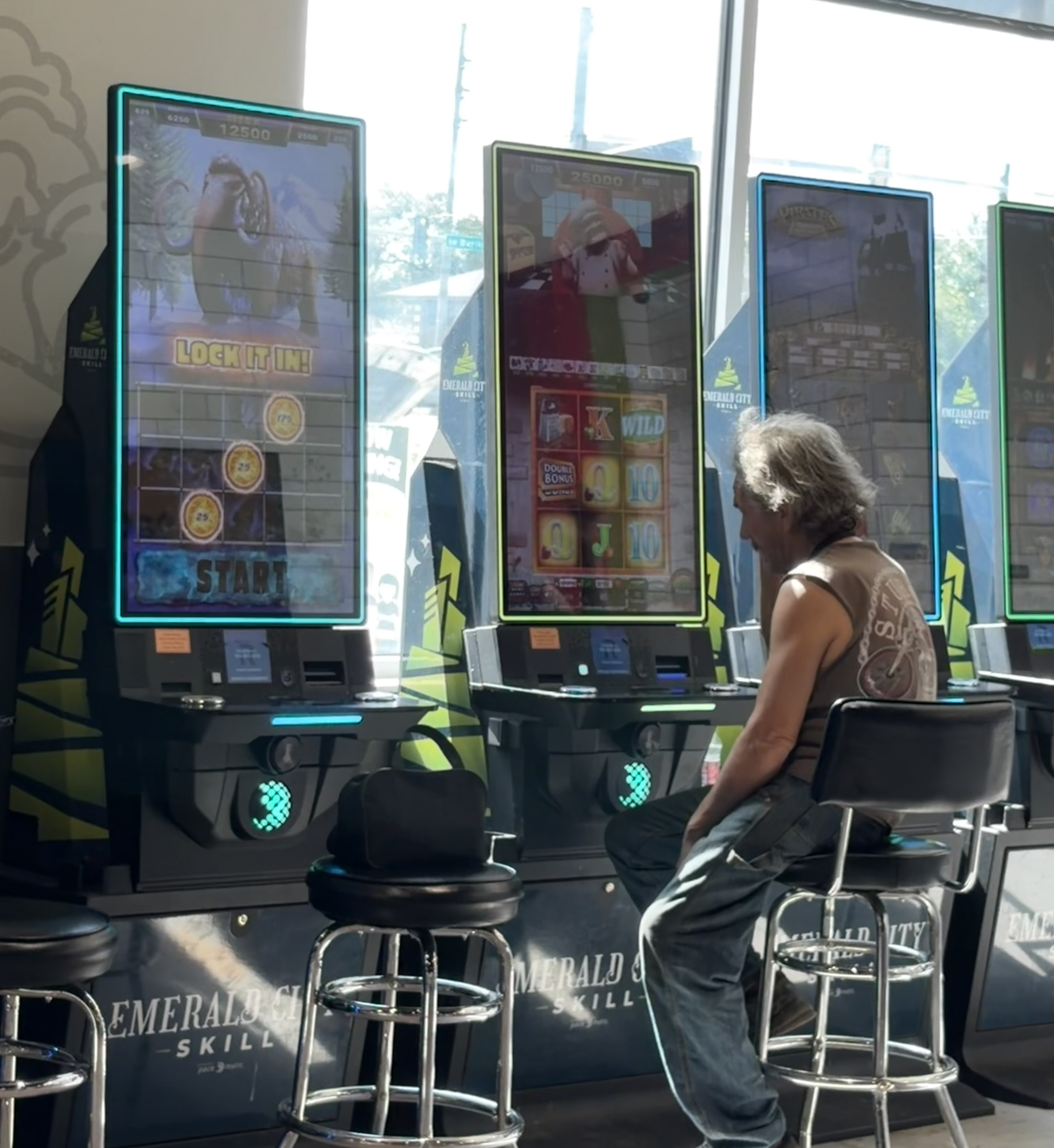
Slot machines in Kwik Shop gas station

In the United States, gambling is subject to a variety of legal restrictions.

In 2018, as per Murphy v. National Collegiate Athletic Association, the United States Supreme Court declared a federal ban on sports gambling to be technically unconstitutional. In the years that followed, dozens of states legalized sports gambling. The sports gambling industry has recorded record profits year-by-year, and advertisements for sports gambling have become pervasive in sporting event coverage.

The American Gaming Association, an industry trade group for commercial gambling, reported $66.6 billion in revenue (the difference between the total amounts wagered minus the payouts) and $14 billion in state and local taxes paid in 2023. For the same year, the National Indian Gaming Commission reported that Native American gaming operations generated $41.9 billion in revenue.

Critics of gambling argue that it leads to increased political corruption, compulsive gambling, higher crime rates, and suicide. Others argue that gambling is a type of regressive tax on the individuals in local economies where gambling venues are located. Critics of sports gambling argue that it has adversely affected sports.

== Authorized types ==
Many levels of government have authorized multiple forms of gambling in an effort to raise money for needed services without raising direct taxes. These include everything from bingo games in church basements, to multimillion-dollar poker tournaments. Sometimes states advertise revenues from certain games to be devoted to particular needs, such as education.

When New Hampshire authorized a state lottery in 1963, it represented a major shift in social policy. No state governments had previously run gambling operations directly to raise money. Other states followed suit, and now the majority of states run some type of lottery to raise funds for state operations. Some states restrict this revenue to specific forms of expenditures, usually oriented toward education, while others allow lottery revenues to be spent on general government. The ethics of certain government practices have been questioned, such as using marketing firms to increase market share, or developing new programs to replace less-lucrative forms of gambling.

The American Gaming Association breaks gambling down into the following categories:

- Card rooms, both public and private
- Commercial casinos
- Charitable games and Bingo
- Tribal casinos
- Legal bookmaking
- Lotteries
- Parimutuel wagering
- Advance-deposit wagering

== Legality ==
While gambling is legal under U.S. federal law, there are significant restrictions pertaining to interstate and online gambling, as each state is free to regulate or prohibit the practice within its borders. The Professional and Amateur Sports Protection Act of 1992 effectively outlawed sports betting nationwide, excluding a few states. However, on May 14, 2018, the United States Supreme Court declared the entire law unconstitutional (Murphy v. National Collegiate Athletic Association).

If state-run lotteries are included, then 48 states allow some form of gambling. The exceptions are Hawaii, where gambling was outlawed prior to statehood, and Utah, which bans gambling in its state constitution. Casino-style gambling, however, is much less widespread than lotteries. Federal law provides leeway for Native American Trust Land to be used for games of chance if an agreement is put in place between the state and the tribal government (e.g. a "Compact" or "Agreement") under the Indian Gaming Regulatory Act of 1988.

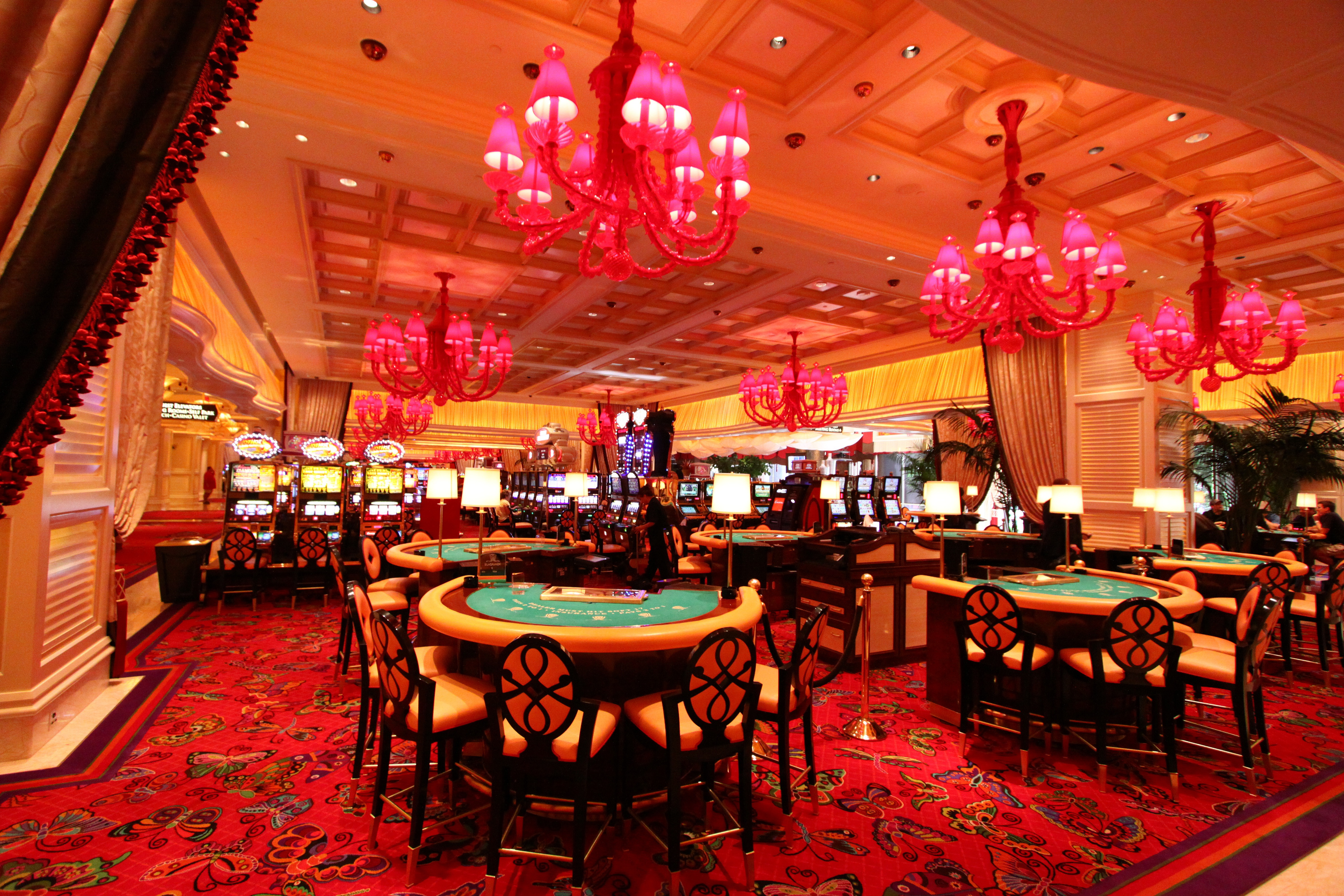
The casino floor at Wynn Las Vegas in Paradise, Nevada

As of 2023, Louisiana and Nevada are the only states which allow casino-style gambling statewide, although both state and local governments impose licensing and zoning restrictions. All other states that allow casino-style gambling restrict it to small geographic areas (e.g., Atlantic City, New Jersey or Deadwood, South Dakota), or to American Indian reservations, some of which are located in or near large cities. The only U.S. states that do not have casinos are Hawaii, Utah, Georgia, and South Carolina.

As domestic dependent nations, American Indian tribes have used legal protection to open casinos, which has been a contentious political issue in California and other states. In some states, casinos are restricted to "riverboats", large multi-story barges that are permanently moored in a body of water.

Online gambling has been more strictly regulated: the Federal Wire Act of 1961 outlawed interstate wagering on sports, but did not address other forms of gambling; it has been the subject of court cases. The Unlawful Internet Gambling Enforcement Act of 2006 (UIGEA) did not specifically prohibit online gambling; instead, it outlawed financial transactions involving online gambling service providers—some offshore gambling providers reacted by shutting down their services for U.S. customers.

Other operators, however, have continued to circumvent UIGEA and have continued to service U.S. customers. For this reason, UIGEA has received criticism from notable figures within the gambling industry.

In May 2025, it has been reported that Ohio lawmakers are debating Senate Bill 197, which would legalize online casino gambling and internet lottery gaming in Ohio, allowing Ohioans aged 21 and over to play games like slots and blackjack on their phones. The bill proposes that 99% of tax revenue from online gambling would go to the state's general fund, with 1% allocated to problem gambling programs, potentially generating millions in new revenue for priorities such as education and child care.

In August 2025, all 50 state attorneys general signed a letter that called on the United States Attorney General to "address the rampant spread of illegal offshore gaming operations" across the United States. The letter asks that the DOJ use its authority to dismantle the financial infrastructure supporting offshore gaming operations.

Legality of gambling types in U.S. states and territories (commercial, racetrack casinos, etc.)
State/district/territory	Charitable	Pari-mutuel	Lotteries	Video Lottery	Commercial	Racetrack	Online	Sports betting
Alabama	Yes	Yes	No	No	No	No	No	No
Alaska	Yes	No	No	No	No	No	No	No
American Samoa	Yes	No	No	No	No	No	No	No
Arizona	Yes	Yes	Yes	No	No	No	No	Yes
Arkansas	Yes	Yes	Yes	No	Yes	Yes	No	Yes
California	Yes	Yes	Yes	No	No	Yes	No	No
Colorado	Yes	Yes	Yes	No	Yes	Yes	No	Yes
Connecticut	Yes	No	Yes	No	No	No	Yes	Yes
Delaware	Yes	Yes	Yes	Yes	Yes	Yes	Yes	Yes
District of Columbia	Yes	No	Yes	No	No	No	No	Yes
Florida	Yes	Yes	Yes	No	No	Yes	Yes	Yes
Georgia	Yes	No	Yes	No	No	No	No	No
Guam	Yes	No	Yes	No	No	No	No	No
Hawaii	No	No	No	No	No	No	No	No
Idaho	Yes	Yes	Yes	No	No	No	No	No
Illinois	Yes	Yes	Yes	Yes	Yes	Yes	Yes	Yes
Indiana	Yes	Yes	Yes	No	Yes	Yes	Yes	Yes
Iowa	Yes	Yes	Yes	No	Yes	Yes	Yes	Yes
Kansas	Yes	Yes	Yes	No	No	No	No	Yes
Kentucky	Yes	Yes	Yes	No	No	Yes	Yes	Yes
Louisiana	Yes	Yes	Yes	Yes	Yes	Yes	Yes	Yes
Maine	Yes	Yes	Yes	No	Yes	Yes	No	Yes
Maryland	Yes	Yes	Yes	Yes	Yes	Yes	No	Yes
Massachusetts	Yes	Yes	Yes	No	Yes	Yes	No	Yes
Michigan	Yes	Yes	Yes	No	Yes	Yes	Yes	Yes
Minnesota	Yes	Yes	Yes	No	No	Yes	No	No
Mississippi	Yes	No	Yes	No	Yes	No	No	Yes
Missouri	Yes	No	Yes	No	Yes	No	No	Yes
Montana	Yes	Yes	Yes	Yes	No	No	No	Yes
Nebraska	Yes	Yes	Yes	No	Yes	Yes	No	Yes
Nevada	Yes	Yes	No	No	Yes	No	Yes	Yes
New Hampshire	Yes	Yes	Yes	No	No	No	Yes	Yes
New Jersey	Yes	Yes	Yes	No	Yes	Yes	Yes	Yes
New Mexico	Yes	Yes	Yes	No	No	Yes	No	Yes
New York	Yes	Yes	Yes	Yes	Yes	Yes	Yes	Yes
North Carolina	Yes	No	Yes	No	No	No	No	Yes
North Dakota	Yes	Yes	Yes	No	No	Yes	No	Yes
Northern Mariana Islands	Yes	No	Yes	No	Yes	No	No	No
Ohio	Yes	Yes	Yes	Yes	Yes	Yes	Yes	Yes
Oklahoma	Yes	Yes	Yes	No	No	Yes	No	No
Oregon	Yes	Yes	Yes	Yes	No	No	No	Yes
Pennsylvania	Yes	Yes	Yes	No	Yes	Yes	Yes	Yes
Puerto Rico	Yes	Yes	Yes	No	Yes	Yes	No	Yes
Rhode Island	Yes	Yes	Yes	Yes	Yes	Yes	Yes	Yes
South Carolina	No	No	Yes	No	No	No	No	No
South Dakota	Yes	Yes	Yes	Yes	Yes	No	No	Yes
Tennessee	No	No	Yes	No	No	No	No	Yes
Texas	Yes	Yes	Yes	No	No	No	No	No
U.S. Virgin Islands	Yes	Yes	Yes	No	Yes	Yes	No	No
Utah	No	No	No	No	No	No	No	No
Vermont	Yes	No	Yes	No	No	No	No	No
Virginia	Yes	Yes	Yes	No	Yes	Yes	No	Yes
Washington	Yes	Yes	Yes	No	Yes	No	No	Yes
West Virginia	Yes	Yes	Yes	Yes	Yes	Yes	Yes	Yes
Wisconsin	Yes	Yes	Yes	No	No	No	No	Yes
Wyoming	Yes	Yes	Yes	No	No	Yes	No	Yes

=== Recriminalization ===
On July 1, 2000, a new law took effect in the state of South Carolina, whereby the ownership, possession, or operation of a video poker machine, for either commercial or personal use, became illegal. Violators are subject to prosecution and substantial fines. Through at least 2007, the only type of legalized gambling in that state is the South Carolina Education Lottery. In 2025, South Carolina was considering legislation to legalize commercial casinos in the state.

== Types ==
=== Commercial casinos ===
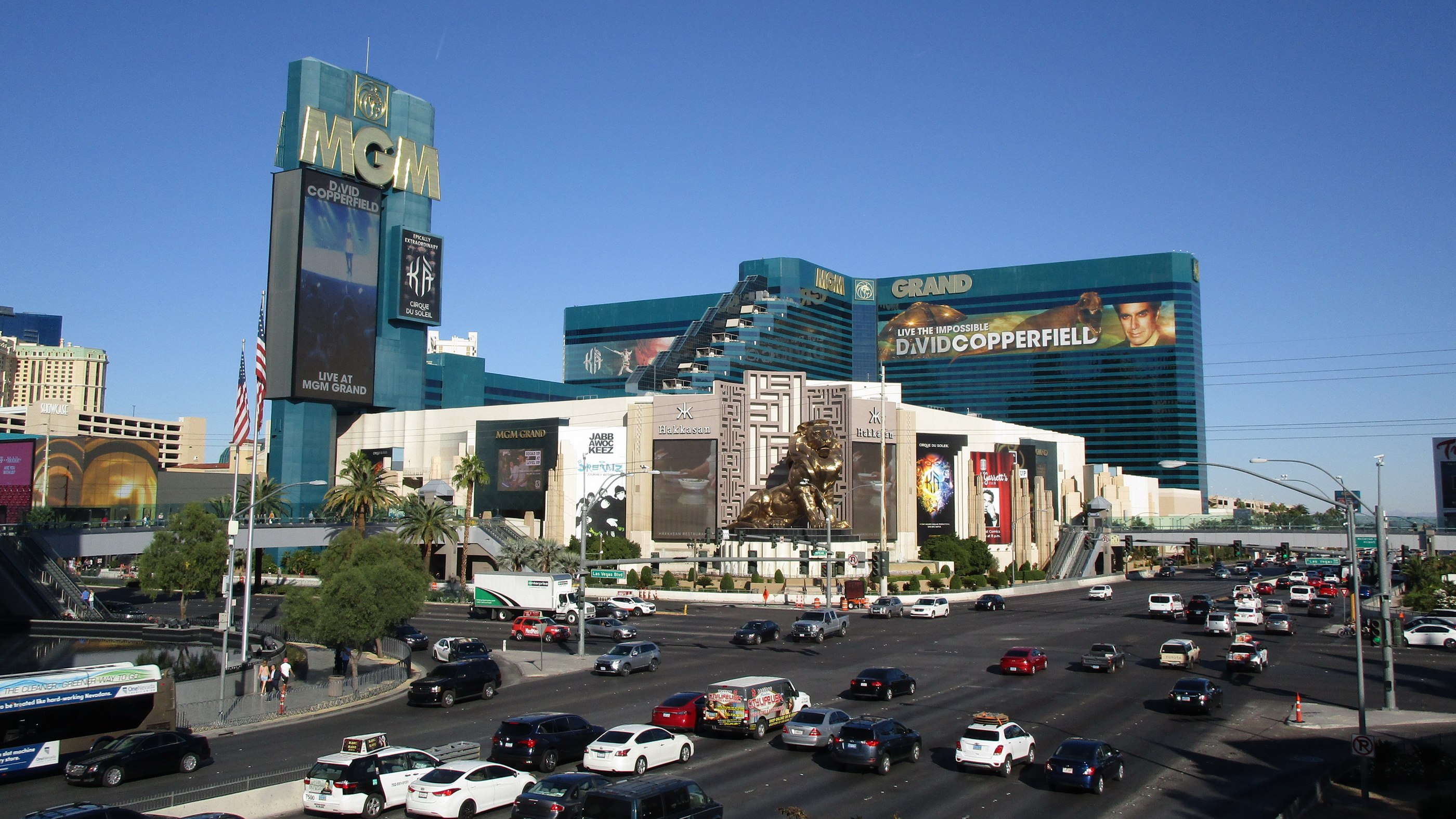
The MGM Grand Las Vegas as seen in 2019

Commercial casinos are founded and run by private or public companies. Aside from tribal lands, 24 states (and three U.S. territories) allow commercial casinos in some form: Arkansas, Colorado, Delaware, Illinois, Indiana, Iowa, Louisiana, Maine, Maryland, Massachusetts, Michigan, Mississippi, Missouri, Montana, Nebraska, Nevada, New Jersey, New York, Northern Marianas Islands, Ohio, Pennsylvania, Puerto Rico, Rhode Island, South Dakota, U.S. Virgin Islands, Virginia, Washington, and West Virginia.

The approximately 450 commercial casinos on non-tribal lands produced a total gross gambling revenue of $34.11 billion in 2006.

=== Native American gaming ===
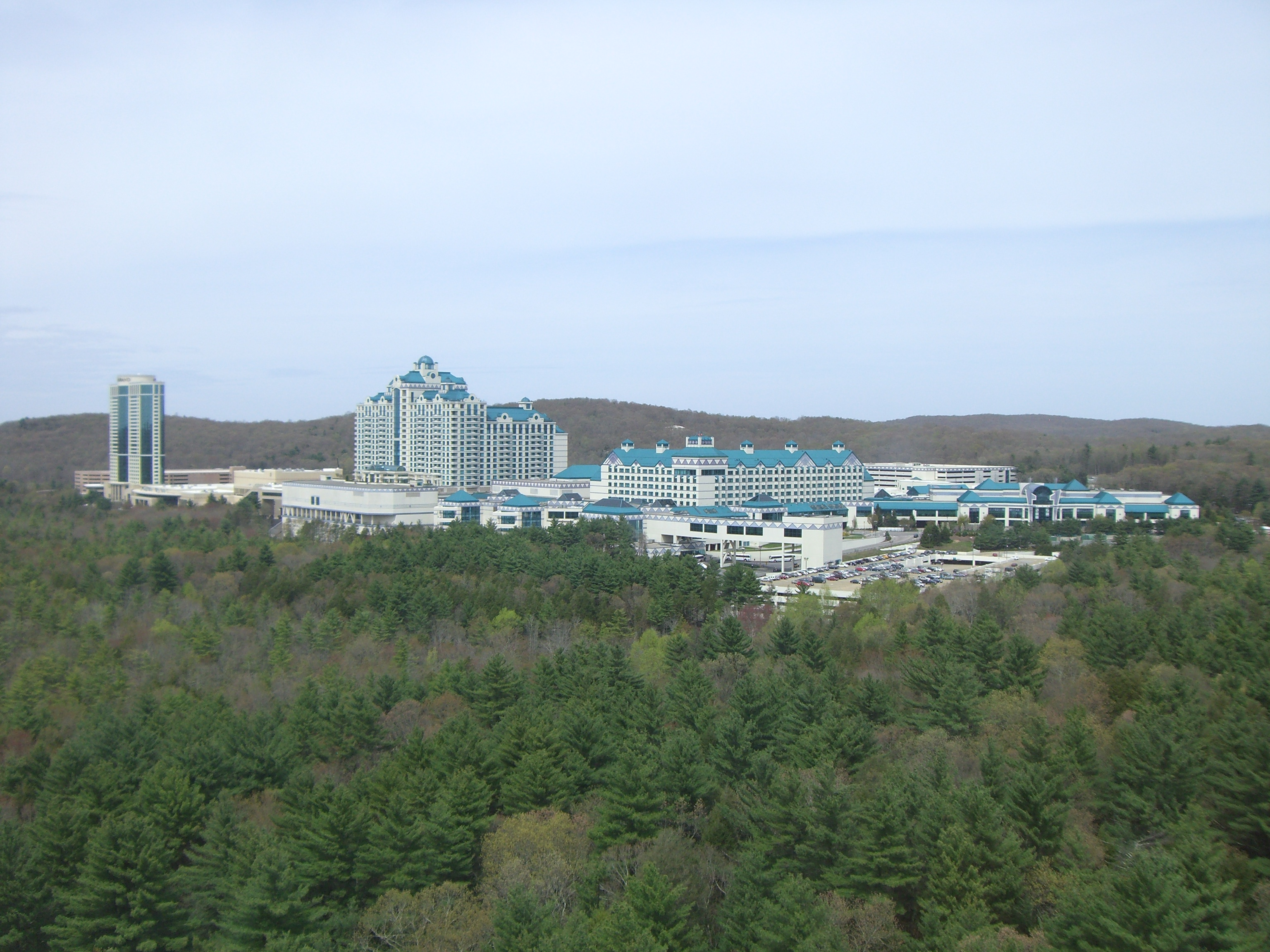
The Foxwoods Casino in Mashantucket, Connecticut, operated by the Mashantucket Pequot Tribal Nation

The history of Native American commercial gambling began in 1979, when the Seminoles began running bingo games. Prior to this, the Native Americans had no previous experience with large-scale commercial gambling. Native Americans were familiar with the concept of small-scale gambling, such as placing bets on sporting contests. For example, the Iroquois, Ojibwes, and Menominees would place bets on games of snow snake. Within six years after commercial gambling among Native Americans developed, 75 to 80 of the 300 federally recognized tribes became involved. By 2006, about 300 Native American groups hosted some sort of gaming.

Some Native American tribes operate casinos on tribal land to provide employment and revenue for their government and their tribe members. Tribal gaming is regulated on the tribal, state, and federal level. Native American tribes are required to use gambling revenue to provide for governmental operations, economic development, and the welfare of their members. Federal regulation of Native American gaming was established under the Indian Gaming Regulatory Act of 1988. Under the provisions of that law, games are divided into three distinct categories:

- Class I games are "traditional" games that involve little or no wagering.
- Class II games include bingo, pull-tabs, and certain non-banked card games (poker, cribbage, contract bridge, whist, etc.).
- Class III games include all casino games (craps, roulette, blackjack, baccarat, slot machines, and other games where the player bets against the house) and games that do not properly fall into classes I or II.

Of the 562 federally recognized tribes in 1988, 201 participated in class II or Class III gaming by 2001. Tribal gambling had revenues of $14.5 billion in 2002 from 354 casinos. Approximately forty percent of the 562 federally recognized tribes operate gaming establishments.

Like other Americans, many indigenous Americans have dissension over the issue of casino gambling. Some tribes are too isolated geographically to make a casino successful, while some do not want non-Native Americans on their land. Though casino gambling is controversial, it has proven economically successful for most tribes, and the impact of American Indian gambling has proven to be far-reaching.

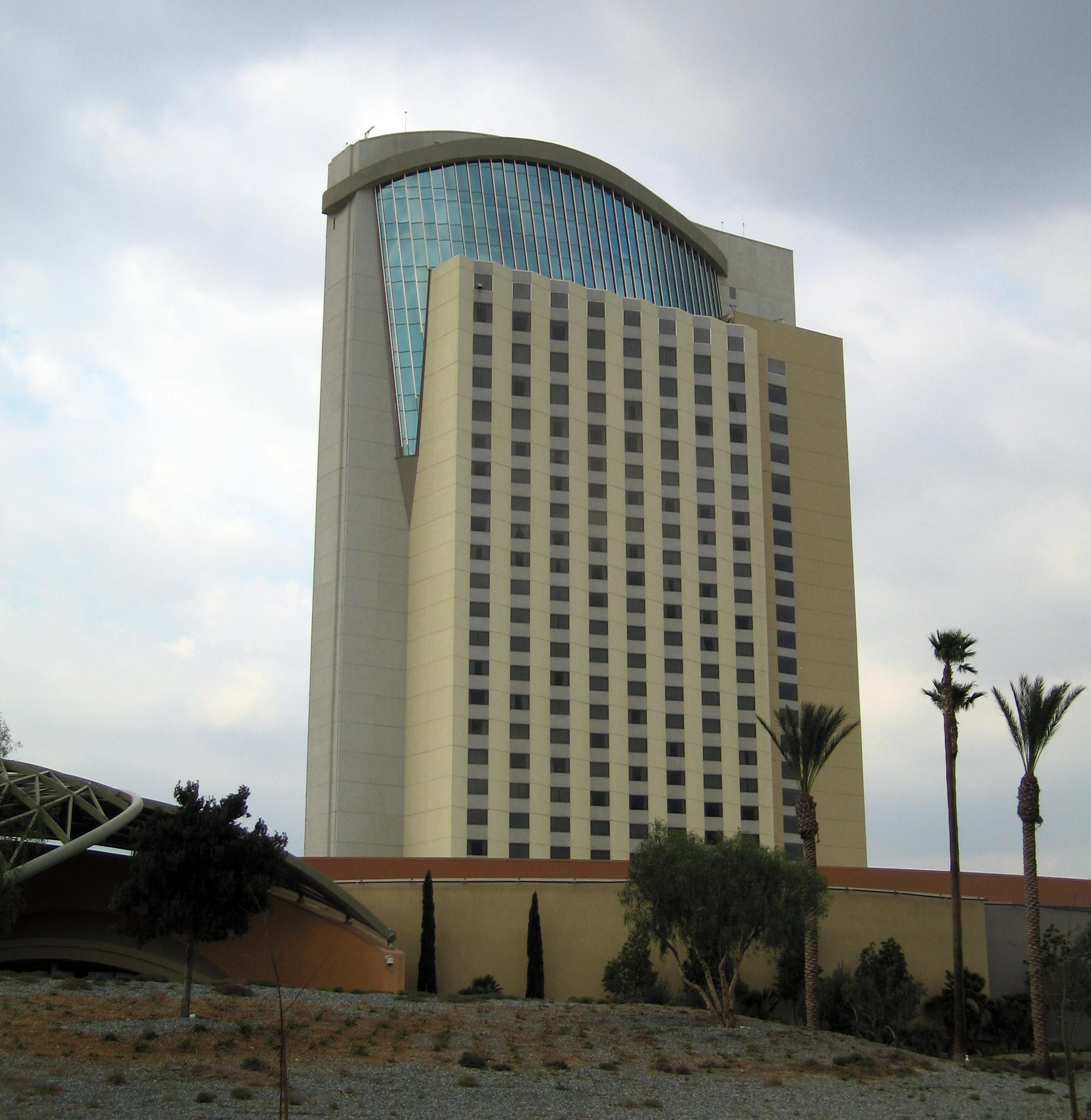
The Morongo Casino, Resort & Spa in Cabazon, California, operated by the Morongo Band of Mission Indians

Gaming creates many jobs, not only for Native Americans, but also for non-Native Americans, and in this way can positively affect relations with the non-Native American community. On some reservations, the number of non-Native American workers is larger than the number of Native American workers because of the scale of the casino resorts. Also, some tribes contribute a share of casino revenues to the state in which they are located, or to charitable and non-profit causes. For example, the San Manuel Band of Mission Indians of California gave $4 million to the UCLA Law School to establish a center for American Indian Studies. The same tribe also gave $1 million to the state for disaster relief when the area was ravaged by wildfires in 2003.

Although casinos have been proven successful for both the tribes and the surrounding regions, state residents may oppose construction of Native American casinos, especially if they have competing projects. For example, in November 2003, the state of Maine voted against a $650 million casino project proposed by the Penobscots and Passamaquoddies. The project's objective was to create jobs for the tribes' young people. The same day the state voted against the Indian casino project, Maine voters approved a plan to add slot machines to the state's harness racing tracks.

Congress passed the Indian Gaming Regulatory Act in 1988 to divide responsibility for Native American gaming among tribal, federal, and state governments. Tribal governments have exclusive authority over Class I gaming. Tribes also regulate Class II gaming, with oversight from the National Indian Gaming Commission. Class III gaming is regulated differently. It must be authorized by a tribal ordinance, permitted in the state where it occurs, and conducted under an approved tribal-state compact.

Tribal-state compacts establish how tribes and states will regulate Class III gaming. They may address jurisdiction, licensing, regulatory standards, enforcement, and other matters related to gaming operations. Compacts are submitted to the Secretary of the Interior for review. If the Secretary does not approve or reject a compact within 45 days, it is considered approved as long as it complies with the Indian Gaming Regulatory Act.

The Indian Gaming Regulatory Act requires that gaming revenues be used only for governmental or charitable purposes. The tribal governments determine specifically how gaming revenues are spent. Revenues have been used to build houses, schools, and roads; to fund health care and education; and to support community and economic development initiatives. Indian gaming is the first and essentially the only economic development tool available on Indian reservations. The National Gaming Impact Study Commission has stated that "no...economic development other than gaming has been found". Tribal governments, though, use gaming revenues to develop other economic enterprises such as museums, malls, and cultural centers.

There are currently 30 states that have Native American gaming: Alabama, Alaska, Arizona, California, Colorado, Connecticut, Florida, Idaho, Iowa, Kansas, Louisiana, Massachusetts, Michigan, Minnesota, Mississippi, Missouri, Montana, Nebraska, Nevada, New Mexico, New York, North Carolina, North Dakota, Oklahoma, Oregon, South Dakota, Texas, Washington, Wisconsin, and Wyoming.

=== Lotteries ===
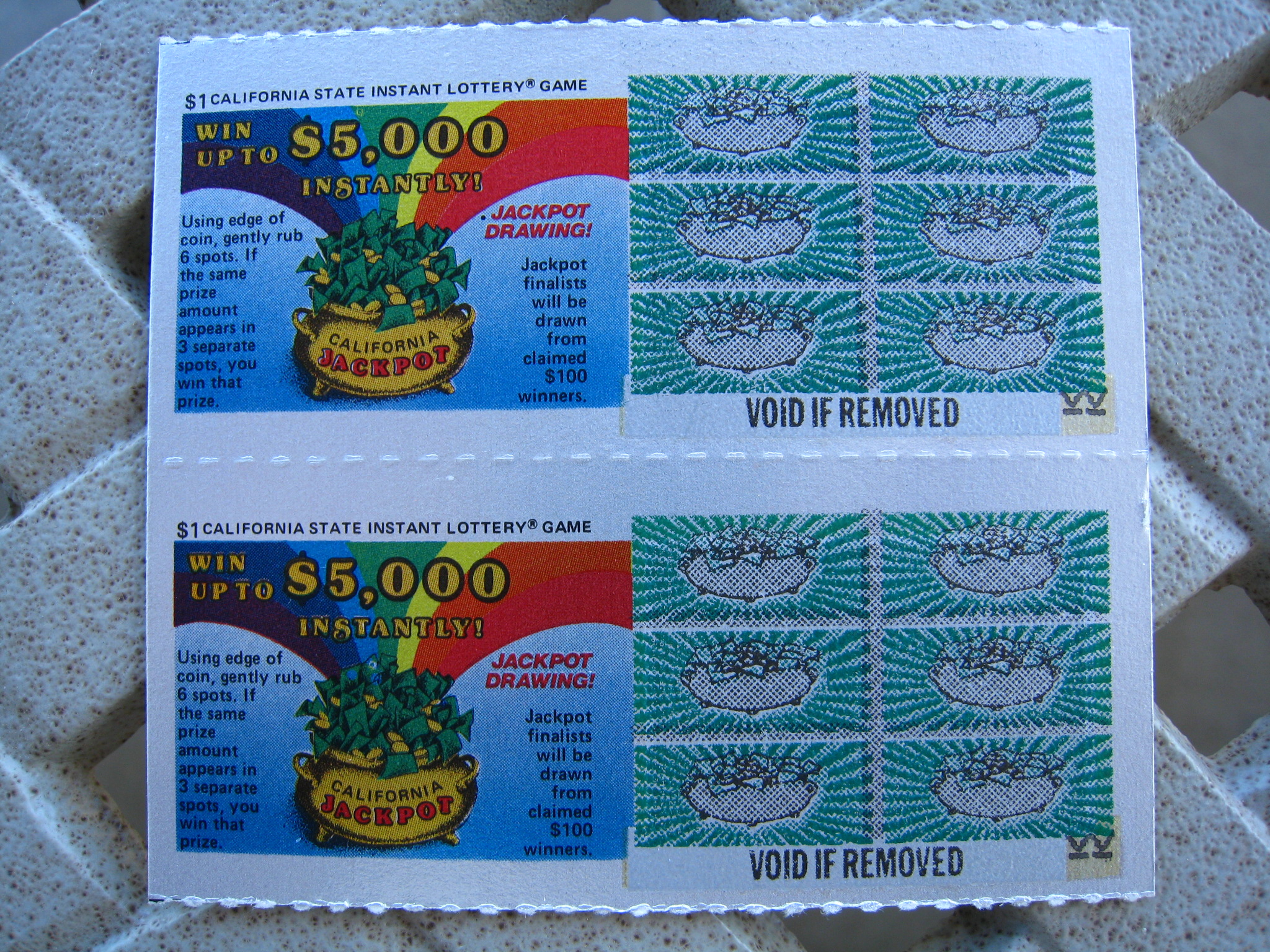
A lottery ticket issued in California

The classic lottery is a drawing in which each contestant buys a combination of numbers. Plays are usually non-exclusive, meaning that two or more ticket holders may buy the same combination. The lottery organization then draws the winning combination of 5-8 numbers, usually from 1 to 50, using a randomized, automatic ball tumbler machine.

To win, contestants match their combinations of numbers with the drawn combination. The combination may be in any order, except in some "mega ball" lotteries, where the "mega" number for the combination must match the ball designated as the "mega ball" in the winning combination. If there are multiple winners, they split the winnings, also known as the "Jackpot". Winnings are currently subject to federal income taxes as ordinary income. Winnings can be awarded as a yearly annuity or as a lump sum, depending on lottery rules.

Most states have state-sponsored and multi-state lotteries. There are only five states that do not sell lottery tickets: Alabama, Alaska, Hawaii, Nevada, and Utah. In some states, revenues from lotteries are designated for a specific budgetary purpose, such as education. Other states put lottery revenue into the general fund.

Multi-jurisdictional lotteries generally have larger jackpots due to the greater number of tickets sold. The Mega Millions and Powerball games are the largest of such lotteries in terms of numbers of participating states.

==== Scratchcard games ====
Some state lotteries run games other than the lotteries. Usually, these are in the scratchcard format, although some states use pull-tab games. In either format, cards are sold that have opaque areas. In some games, all of the opaque material is removed to see if the contestant has won, and how much. In other scratchcard games, a contestant must pick which parts of a card to scratch, to match amounts or play another form of game.

=== Sports betting ===
Map of sports betting legality as of January 2024: Sports betting legal Sports betting illegal

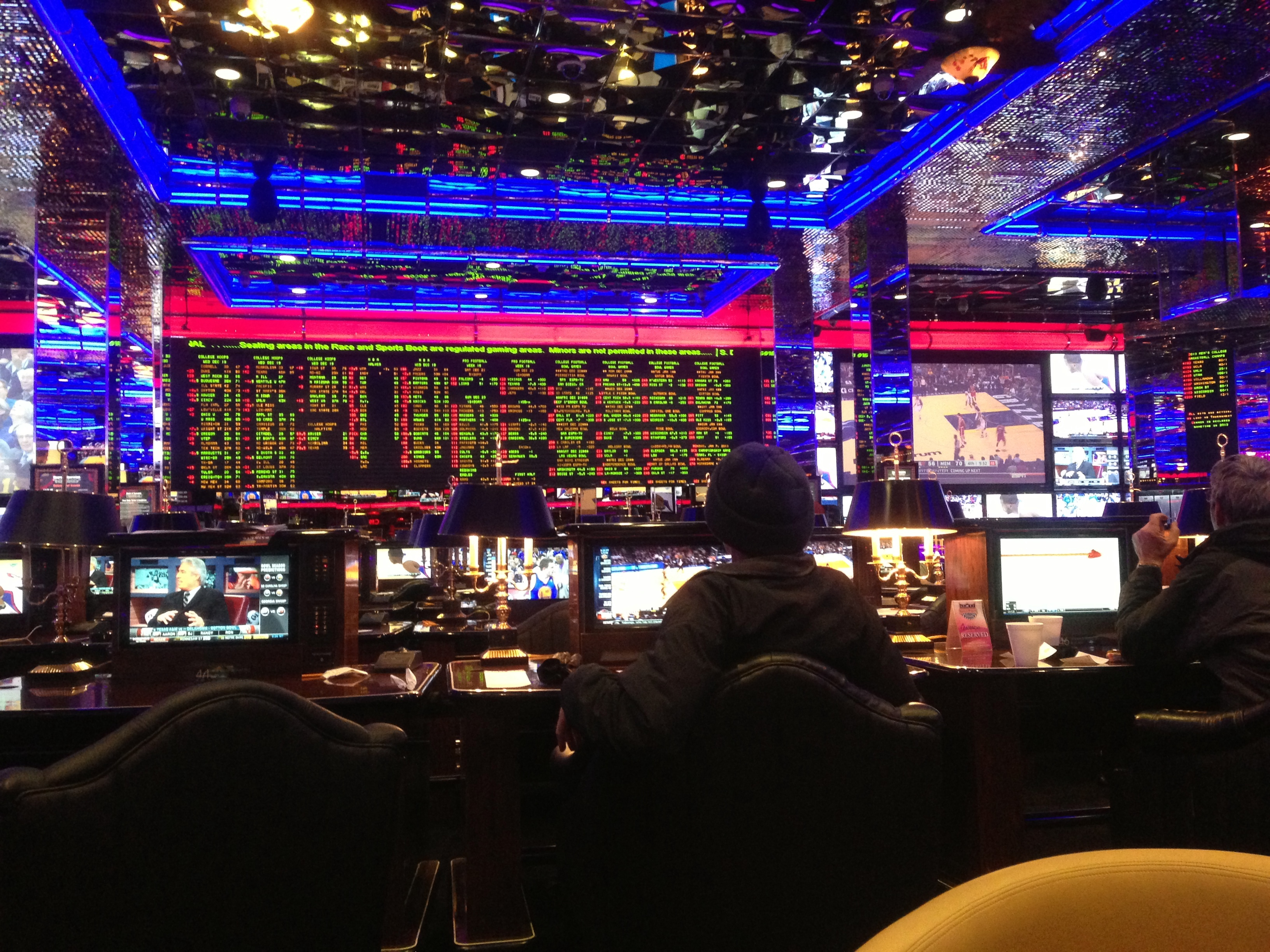
The sports book at Peppermill Reno in Reno, Nevada

In 1992, the U.S. Congress passed the Professional and Amateur Sports Protection Act (PASPA). It mandated states not to legalize sports betting apart from parimutuel horse racing, dog racing and jai alai. The sports lotteries conducted in Oregon, Delaware, and Montana were exempt, as well as the licensed sports pools in Nevada. It also provided a one-year window for states which operated licensed casino gaming to legalize sports wagering, which New Jersey intended to do but did not reach the deadline.

In 2018, PASPA was overturned by the Supreme Court of the United States in Murphy v. National Collegiate Athletic Association, ruling that it conflicted with the Tenth Amendment. New Jersey, Delaware, and other states quickly drafted bills legalizing sports betting soon after. States had to determine which department would oversee state-regulated sportsbooks, usually choosing between their respective gambling commissions, lottery boards or, in the case of Kentucky, the state horse racing commission.

As of September 2023, sportsbooks are legal in 38 states, the District of Columbia, and the territory of Puerto Rico. Online sports betting is also legal in 30 states, Washington, D.C., and Puerto Rico. The American Gaming Association reported a 2023 handle of $121 billion and a revenue of $11.0 billion in commercial sportsbooks. This marked a significant increase from 2018, when approximately 25 million fewer Americans wagered on sporting events. A 2025 study from the University of California, Los Angeles found that the spread of legal sports betting caused consumers to take on more problematic debt and led to an increase in bankruptcies.

State	Sports betting legalized	Retail sports betting	Online sports betting	Notes
Alabama	No	No	No	
Alaska	No	No	No	
Arizona	Yes	Yes	Yes	Legalized on April 15, 2021; effective May 24, 2021
Arkansas	Yes	Yes	Yes	Legalized in November 2018; effective July 1, 2019. Online sports betting allowed since February 22, 2022.
California	No	No	No	
Colorado	Yes	Yes	Yes	Legalized on November 5, 2019; effective May 2020
Connecticut	Yes	Yes	Yes	Legalized in May 2021; effective November 2021
Delaware	Yes	Yes	No	Offered parlay betting and championship futures for the NFL prior to PASPA being struck down; expanded on June 5, 2018
Florida	Yes	Yes	Yes	Legalized in May 2021; effective briefly in November-December 2021; resumed in November 2023; owned by the Seminole Tribe of Florida.
Georgia	No	No	No	
Hawaii	No	No	No	HB 2570 is currently seeking to regulate online sports betting under the Department of Business, Economic Development, and Tourism.
Idaho	No	No	No	
Illinois	Yes	Yes	Yes	Legalized on June 2, 2019
Indiana	Yes	Yes	Yes	Legalized in May 2019; effective September 1, 2019
Iowa	Yes	Yes	Yes	Legalized in May 2019; effective August 15, 2019
Kansas	Yes	Yes	Yes	Legalized on July 1, 2022; effective September 1, 2022.
Kentucky	Yes	Yes	Yes	Legalized in March 2023, effective June 28, 2023. In-person sportsbook location bets allowed since September 7, 2023. Online betting allowed since September 28, 2023.
Louisiana	Yes	Yes	Yes	Legalized in November 2020; only in 55 out of 64 parishes.
Maine	Yes	Yes	Yes	Legalized on May 2, 2022. Online sports betting went live on November 3, 2023, with in person betting allowed but no authorized entity yet licensed.
Maryland	Yes	Yes	Yes	Legalized in November 2020; effective June 2021.
Massachusetts	Yes	Yes	Yes	Legalized on August 10, 2022.
Michigan	Yes	Yes	Yes	Legalized in December 2019; in-person sports betting allowed starting March 2020; online and mobile betting allowed starting January 22, 2021
Minnesota	No	No	No	
Mississippi	Yes	Yes	No	Legalized on August 1, 2018; mobile betting not allowed
Missouri	Yes	Yes	Yes	Voters approved sports betting on November 5, 2024; effective December 1, 2025.
Montana	Yes	Yes	Yes	Legalized on May 3, 2019 *Online gaming in Montana is only permitted on the premises of gaming facilities.
Nebraska	Yes	Yes	No	Legalized in May 2021; effective June 2023.
Nevada	Yes	Yes	Yes	Legalized in 1949 (prior to PASPA)
New Hampshire	Yes	Yes	Yes	Legalized in July 2019
New Jersey	Yes	Yes	Yes	Legalized on June 14, 2018
New Mexico	Yes	Yes	No	Legalized on October 16, 2018
New York	Yes	Yes	Yes	Legalized on July 17, 2019. Online sports betting allowed since January 8, 2022.
North Carolina	Yes	Yes	Yes	Legalized on July 26, 2019; tribal casinos only; mobile betting not allowed
North Dakota	Yes	Yes	No	Only at the Dakota Magic Casino and Hotel in Hankinson, owned by the Sisseton-Wahpeton Oyate Tribe
Ohio	Yes	Yes	Yes	Legalized on March 23, 2022; effective January 1, 2023
Oklahoma	No	No	No	
Oregon	Yes	Yes	Yes	Legal prior to PASPA but limited; expanded on August 27, 2019
Pennsylvania	Yes	Yes	Yes	Legalized on November 16, 2018
Rhode Island	Yes	Yes	Yes	Legalized on November 26, 2018
South Carolina	No	No	No	
South Dakota	Yes	Yes	No	Legalized on November 3, 2020; limited to the city of Deadwood
Tennessee	Yes	No	Yes	Legalized on April 30, 2019; allows only online betting
Texas	No	No	No	
Utah	No	No	No	
Vermont	Yes	No	Yes	Legalized on June 14, 2023; effective January 2024; allows only online betting.
Virginia	Yes	Yes	Yes	Legalized on July 1, 2020
Washington	Yes	Yes	No	Legalized in March 2020; effective September 2021
West Virginia	Yes	Yes	Yes	Legalized on August 30, 2018
Wisconsin	Yes	Yes	No	Legalized in July 2021; effective November 2021; tribal casinos only
Wyoming	Yes	Yes	Yes	Legalized in April 2021; effective September 2021.
American Samoa	No	No	No	
District of Columbia	Yes	Yes	Yes	Legalized in May 2019
Guam	No	No	No	
Northern Mariana Islands	No	No	No	
Puerto Rico	No	No	No	
U.S. Virgin Islands	No	No	No	

== Gambling revenues ==
According to the Center for Gaming Research University Libraries, legal gambling revenues for 2007 were as follows:

- Total: $158.54 billion
- Commercial casinos: $41.2 billion
- Tribal casinos: $31.945 billion
- Card rooms: $1.9 billion
- Lotteries: $80.55 billion
- Legal bookmaking: $248 million
- Pari-mutuel wagering: $295 million
- Charitable games and bingo: $2.15 billion

According to the American Gaming Association, legal gambling revenues at commercial establishments (not including tribal casinos) for 2023 were as follows:

- Total: $66.6 billion
- Casinos: $49.4 billion
- Sports gambling (not including parimutuel): $11.0 billion
  - Online: $10.4 billion
  - Retail: $0.6 billion
- Online casino: $6.2 billion
- Online (sports and casino): $16.6 billion

Meanwhile, the National Indian Gaming Commission reported that Native American gaming operations had $41.9 billion in revenue in 2023.

== See also ==
- Historical horse racing
- List of casinos in the United States
- List of integrated resorts
- Gambling in California
- Gambling in Connecticut
- Gambling in Indiana
- Gambling in Iowa
- Gambling in Maine
- Gambling in Massachusetts
- Gambling in New Hampshire
- Gambling in New Jersey
- Gambling in North Carolina
- Gambling in Oregon
- Gambling in Pennsylvania
- Gambling in Texas
- UIGEA
