= Gambling in Texas =

Gambling in the U.S. state of Texas

Legal forms of gambling in the U.S. state of Texas include the Texas Lottery; parimutuel wagering on horse and greyhound racing; charitable bingo and raffles; and three Native American casinos. Other forms of gambling are illegal in Texas.

Texas law states that a person commits the offense of illegal gambling, which is a Class C misdemeanor, if they make a bet on the results of a game, contest, or political nomination, or if they place bets with money or thing of value in any game played with cards, dice, balls, or other gambling device. There are exceptions to this if the gambling is done in a private place, nobody receives anything other than personal winnings, and, except for skill or luck, the chances of winning or losing are the same for all participants.

== Texas Sports Betting Legislation Status ==
Sports wagering continues to be illegal in Texas, whether via "bricks and mortar" or online, but joint resolutions have been proposed during the 89th Legislative Session in both the Texas House and Senate to legalize sports betting. Legalized sports betting has not received favorable attention by members of legislation in the past, with the last presented bill during the 88th Legislative Session failing to pass the House vote.

On February 2, 2025, State Senator Carol Alvarado introduced Senate Joint Resolution 16, a proposal to allow up to seven destination resort casinos in Texas and authorize retail sports betting at those locations. The resolution also includes provisions to establish a Texas Gaming Commission to oversee the new gaming industry. To be enacted, the resolution must receive two-thirds approval in both legislative chambers and then be approved by Texas voters in a statewide referendum.

== Lottery ==
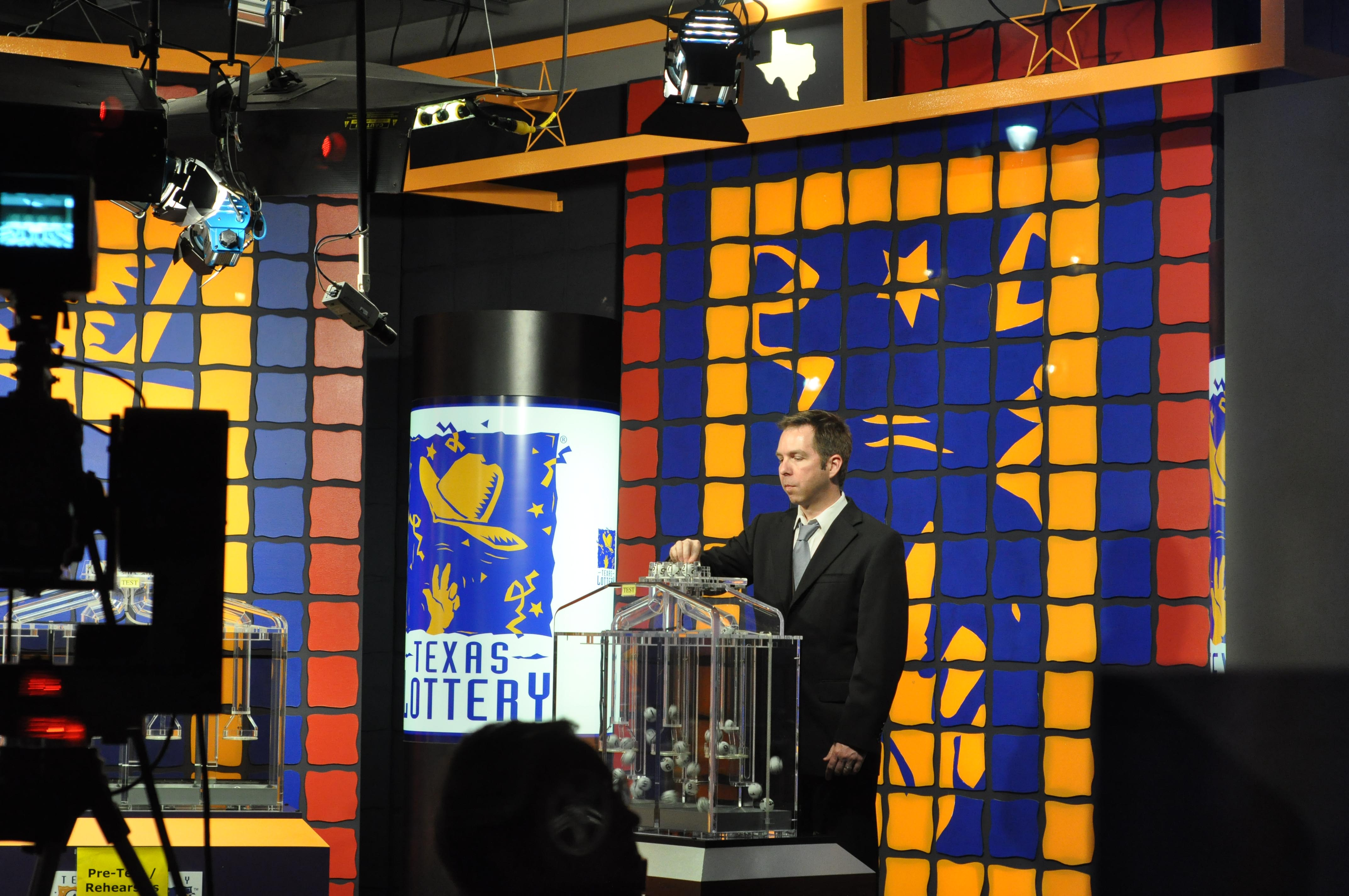
A drawing being held at the Texas Lottery's television studio

The Texas Lottery began in 1992 and offers scratch-off and drawing games, including the multi-jurisdiction Mega Millions and Powerball games.

== Charitable gaming ==
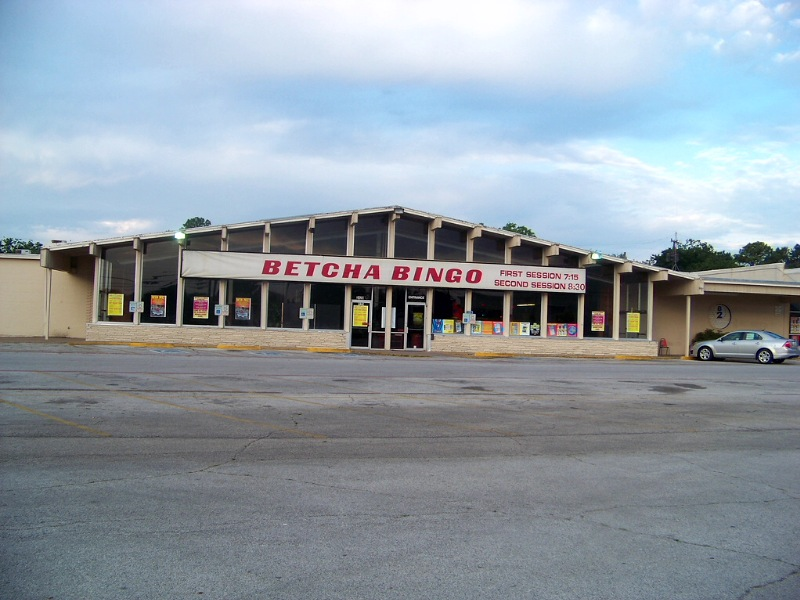
A charitable bingo hall in Irving

=== Bingo ===
Non-profit organizations and other community groups may operate bingo games and sell pull-tabs (referred to as "Instant Bingo"), with a license from the Charitable Bingo Operations Division of the Texas Lottery Commission. Bingo sessions are limited to three per week, with a maximum prize value of $750 for a single game. Local referendums, required to allow bingo, have passed in 226 of the state's 254 counties. As of 2011, there were 1,227 organizations authorized to conduct bingo, and they awarded $533 million in prizes.

=== Raffles ===
Qualified organizations can hold up to two raffles per year with non-cash prizes. Prize value may not exceed $50,000 (or $250,000 if the prize is a house), unless the prize is donated to the organization.

The Legislature in 1971 exempted charities from the state's anti-lottery statute, but the act was struck down in 1973 by the Texas Court of Criminal Appeals, which ruled that it violated the state constitution's requirement for a ban on lotteries. Voters approved a constitutional amendment allowing raffles in 1989, and enabling legislation went into effect at the beginning of 1990.

== Parimutuel wagering ==
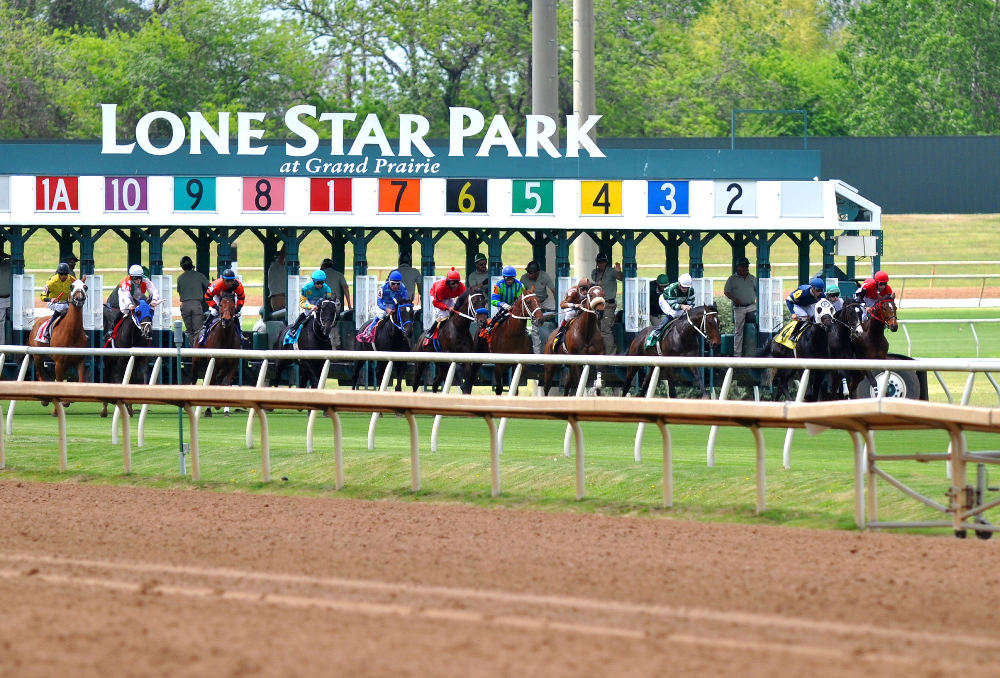
Horses start out of the gate at Lone Star Park

Parimutuel wagering is allowed at horse and greyhound tracks, overseen by the Texas Racing Commission.

Class 1 horse tracks can be granted an unlimited number of racing days. Up to three are allowed, in the state's three largest metropolitan areas. They are: Lone Star Park in Grand Prairie, Retama Park in Selma, and Sam Houston Race Park in Houston. Class 2 tracks can be granted a maximum of 60 racing days per year. Several class 2 tracks are under development, but none are currently operating. Class 3 licenses are issued to county or nonprofit fairs, and allow 16 racing days at most. The only current class 3 license is held by the Gillespie County Fair in Fredericksburg. Class 4 licenses, of which there are currently none, are issued to county fairs and allow 5 racing days.

The law allows for up to three greyhound tracks in the coastal counties of Cameron, Galveston, and Nueces. Two tracks, Gulf Coast Racing in Corpus Christi and Valley Race Park in Harlingen, are licensed but are not in operation. A third track, Gulf Greyhound Park in La Marque, closed in 2020. From 2010 onward, with the greyhound industry on the decline, live racing was held primarily at Gulf Greyhound Park, with the other two tracks focusing on simulcast betting.

Texas first legalized parimutuel betting in 1933 as a way to raise revenue during the Great Depression. Four major tracks operated in the state, until 1937, when betting was banned again at a special legislative session called by Governor James V. Allred.

In 1960, gambler Virgil "Red" Berry was elected to the Texas House of Representatives on a pro-parimutuel platform. His efforts made little headway, and in protest, he proposed in 1969 to split the state in two, with horse betting legal in South Texas. Nonbinding statewide referendums to revive parimutuel betting were defeated in 1962, 1968, 1974, and 1978, with opposition led largely by Baptist churches. A poll on the Republican primary ballot in 1982 found majority support for betting. Finally, in 1987, Texas voters approved a referendum legalizing parimutuel wagering again and creating the Texas Racing Commission, with a local election required in any county to allow a track. Simulcast wagering at tracks was legalized in 1991.

== Indian gaming ==
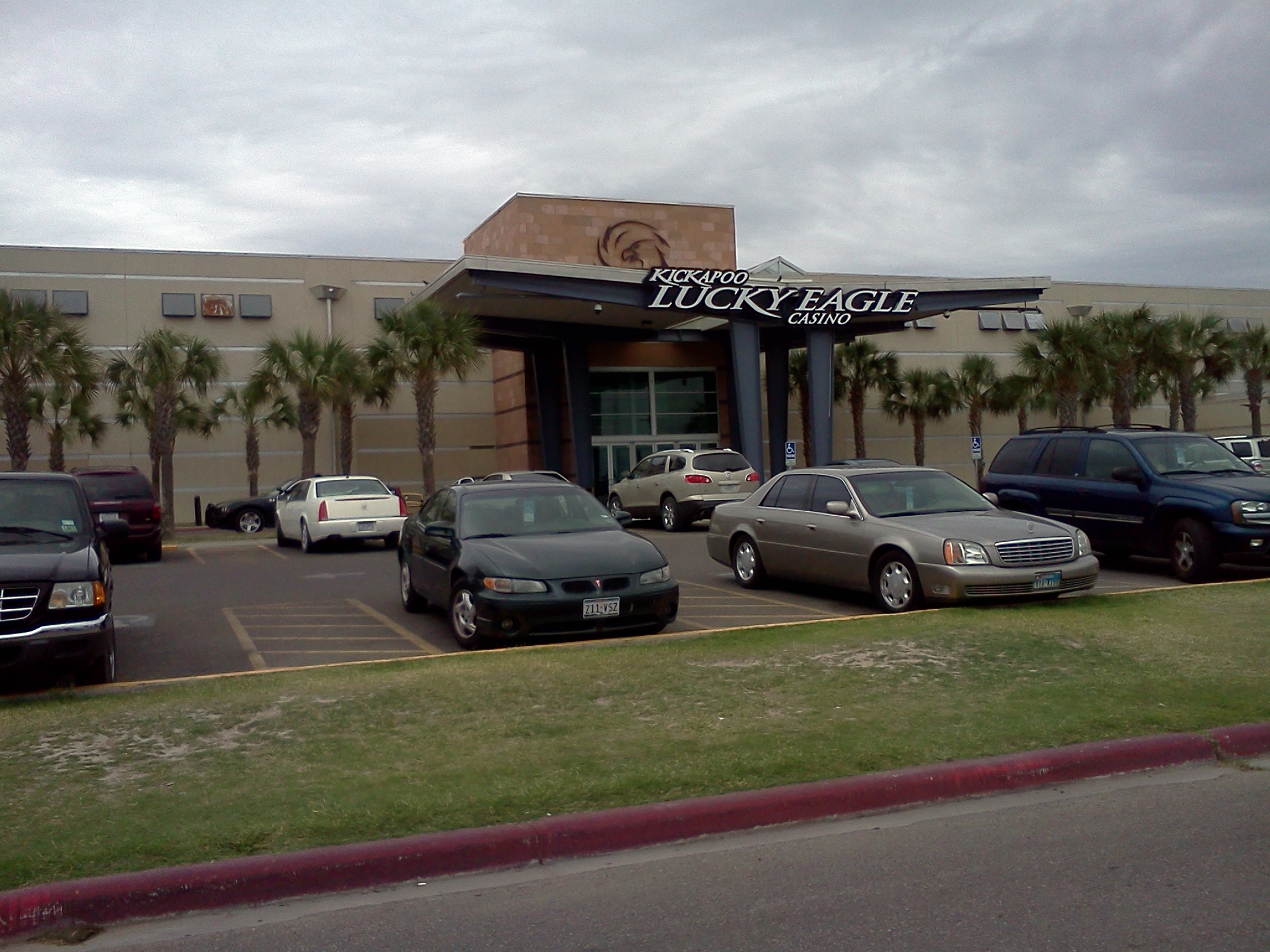
Kickapoo Lucky Eagle Casino in Eagle Pass

Each of Texas's three federally recognized tribes operates a casino. The Kickapoo Traditional Tribe of Texas has the Kickapoo Lucky Eagle Casino in Eagle Pass, the Tigua tribe of the Ysleta del Sur Pueblo has the Speaking Rock Entertainment Center in El Paso, and the Alabama–Coushatta Tribe has Naskila Gaming in Livingston. All three are Class II facilities, offering electronic bingo games that are similar to slot machines. The latter two were the subject of extensive litigation over their legality.

In the 1980s, court decisions and the Indian Gaming Regulatory Act (IGRA) established the rights of Indian tribes to operate any kind of gambling permitted elsewhere in the state. Taking advantage of the legality of bingo in Texas, the Tiguas opened their Speaking Rock high-stakes bingo hall in 1993. Over the following year, its offerings expanded to include poker and "Tigua 21", a non-banking variant of blackjack. The Tiguas sought a compact with the state under the IGRA to allow casino-style, or "class 3" gaming, citing the state's acceptance of a lottery and parimutuel betting, but the state refused to negotiate. Courts sided with Texas, ruling that the Restoration Act that gave federal recognition to the Tiguas and Alabama-Coushatta in 1987 specifically forbade gambling, and took precedence over the IGRA.

Despite the ruling, neither federal nor state authorities tried to close the casino, and the tribe expanded operations further by adding slot machines in 1996. Republican Governor George W. Bush asked Attorney General Dan Morales in 1998 to take legal action, but Morales, a Democrat, said that responsibility laid with local and federal officials. Morales was succeeded in 1999, however, by Republican John Cornyn, who proceeded with a federal lawsuit against the tribe. The suit was successful, and the Speaking Rock Casino closed its doors in February 2002.

The Kickapoo casino opened in 1996, offering bingo, poker, its own blackjack variant, and electronic pull-tab dispensers designed to look and operate like slot machines. Bush questioned the legality of these "Lucky Tab II" machines at the same time as he was pushing for action against the Tigua casino, so the tribe filed a preemptive lawsuit, and won a ruling that they qualified as class 2 devices. The original facility, constructed of modular buildings, was replaced in October 2004 with a new 100,000-square-foot (9,300 m^{2}) casino and an arena.

The Alabama-Coushatta Tribe had voted against gambling operations in 1994 on moral grounds, but it reversed that decision in 1999 after seeing the success of the Grand Casino Coushatta, run by a related tribe in Louisiana. The tribe opened its "Entertainment Center" in November 2001, with slots, blackjack, and poker, even as the Tiguas were appealing their loss in court. Cornyn filed suit against the Alabama-Coushatta two months later, citing the Restoration Act. Courts sided with Cornyn, and the casino was closed in July 2002.

In 2015, the National Indian Gaming Commission issued an opinion that the Tigua and Alabama-Coushatta tribes could legally conduct gaming, contradicting the earlier court rulings. This led to the Alabama-Coushatta reopening their casino, and the Tiguas converting their facility, which had been operating as a sweepstakes parlor, back into a casino. The state filed suit in 2017 to shut them down. Ultimately, the Supreme Court ruled in 2022 that the language of the Restoration Act allowed the tribes to offer bingo games free of state regulation, allowing the casinos to remain open.

== Eight-liners ==
"Game rooms" throughout the state feature slot machine-like devices commonly called "eight-liners". The machines are legal if they offer only non-cash prizes valued at less than $5, but law enforcement officials say that illegal cash payouts are near universal. Enforcement of existing laws regarding the machines has been inconsistent, and legislative efforts to ban them have failed. In response to past frustrations, in April 2013 state and federal police launched Operation Bishop to crack-down on the illegal "eight-liner" operations in the Brownsville area.

Eight-liners began to proliferate following passage of the 1993 "fuzzy animal law", which was intended to clarify that amusement games that award low-value prizes or tickets were legal.

== Casino cruises ==
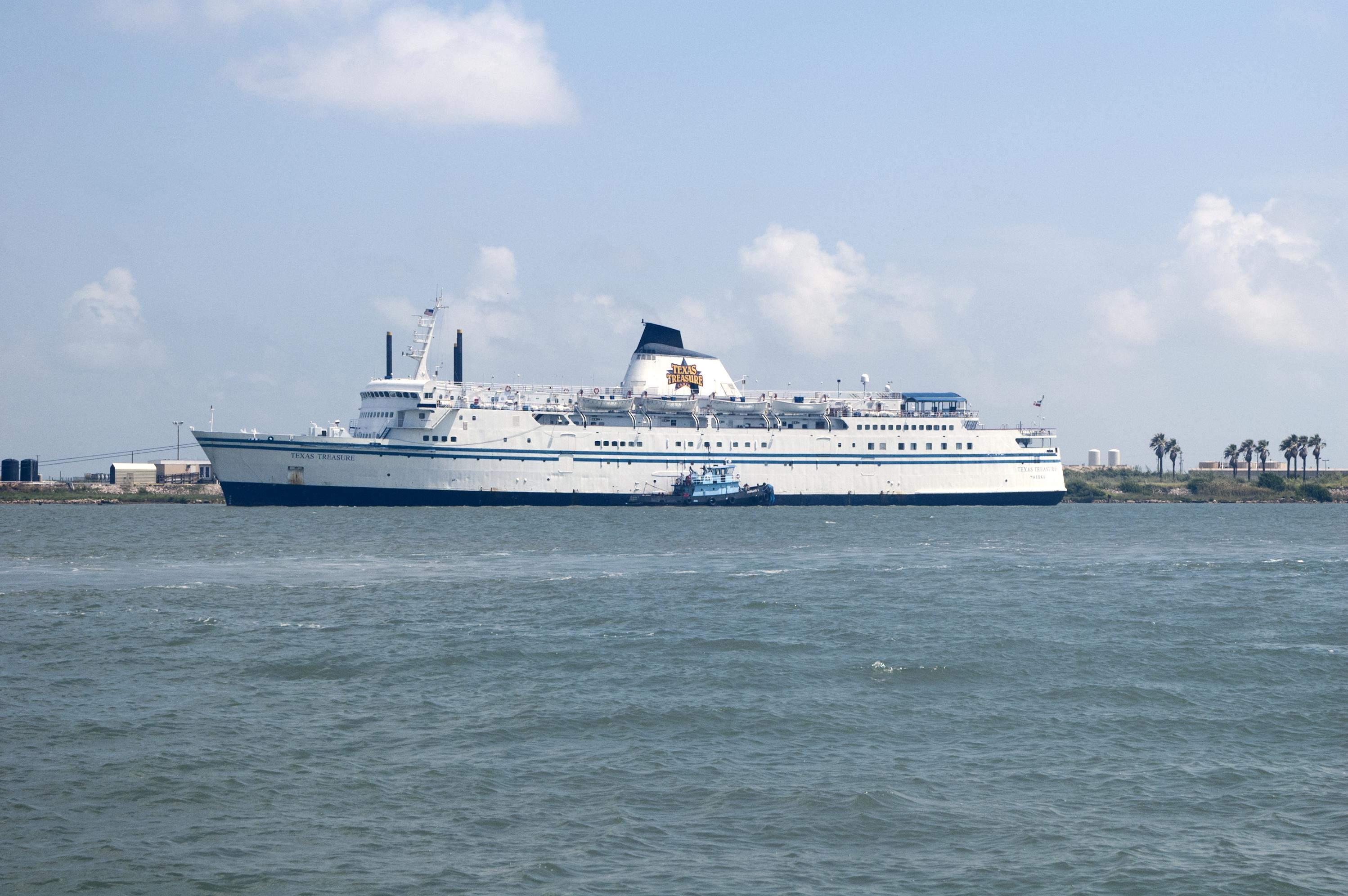
The Texas Treasure casino ship, seen in Port Aransas in 2007

Gambling boats have operated at times out of Texas ports, taking passengers on one-day "cruises to nowhere" in international waters, where there are no gambling laws.

The casino cruise industry developed in other states in the early 1980s, but was a latecomer to Texas because of a state law prohibiting the docking of ships with gambling equipment unless they first stopped at a foreign port of call. The first such operation in the state was Le Mistral, which began sailing out of Port Isabel in 1988, nominally to the Mexican village of Mezquital, though it typically did not approach within a mile of the port. Le Mistral was closed by bankruptcy in 1992.

Galveston officials pushed for a repeal of the foreign port of call requirement, succeeding in 1989. Two casino ships, the Pride of Mississippi and the Europa Jet, began operations out of the Port of Galveston later that year. The Europa Jet ran into financial problems and left for Mississippi in September 1990. Another boat, the Sea Palace, began offering cruises out of the Port of Freeport in January 1991, but both it and the Pride closed for business in April, after federal prosecutors said they would enforce a 1948 law requiring gambling ships to visit a foreign port or sail for at least 24 hours.

Casino cruises returned to Galveston in November 1993 with the Star of Texas, which gained the blessing of the U.S. attorney's office by devoting less than half of its space to casinos, and emphasizing non-gaming activities. The business failed in November 1994, and the ship was moved to Miami.

Two new gambling boat ventures began in the Brownsville area in the fall of 1999: Casino Del Mar on the Island Dawn, sailing out of Port Isabel; and Casino Padre on the Entertainer, out of South Padre Island. Casino Del Mar failed in January 2000, but then moved to Port Aransas under new management as the Texas Treasure. Casino Padre ceased operations in November 2000.

In 2001, three casino boats were launched along the upper Texas coast. The Talisman, out of Galveston, set off in April, but lasted only a month. The Surfside Princess began excursions from Freeport in June, but in October was seized by its owner for failure to pay charter fees. The operators of the Port Aransas boat expanded to Freeport in November with the Texas Treasure II. It lasted until February 2002, when it was moved to Port Aransas on a temporary basis to substitute for the under-repair Texas Treasure; instead of returning to Freeport, it was then moved to Palm Beach, Florida.

The first Texas Treasure moved to Palm Beach in October 2002, replacing its sister ship; for lack of business, it returned to Port Aransas a year later. It continued sailing until May 2008, when it closed for routine maintenance; after a legal dispute between its operator and its owner, it never returned to service.

A new gambling boat, the Aransas Queen Casino, began sailing out of Corpus Christi in May 2015. It moved to Galveston in April 2017 and became the Jacks or Better Casino. The boat moved to Georgia in 2018.

== See also ==
- Gambling in the United States
- History of vice in Texas
- Instant Racing
- Law of Texas
