= HMS Shah (D21) =

American escort carrier transferred to the Royal Navy

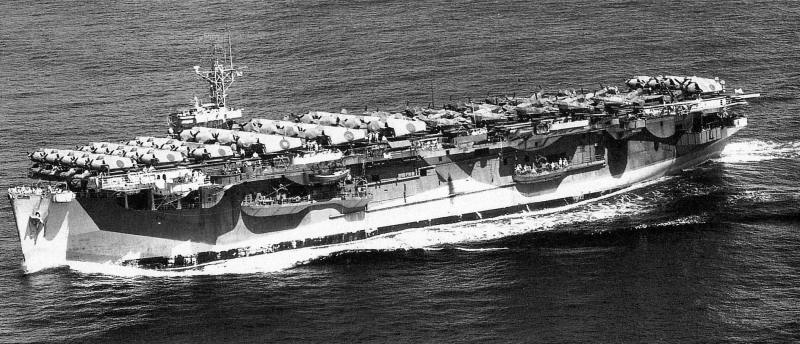
- HMS Shah in January 1944, en route from Alameda to Cochin via Williamstown, Australia. In addition to her usual complement of aircraft, she ferried Wildcats and Curtiss P-40s on her deck.

History

United States
- Name: USS Jamaica
- Builder: Seattle-Tacoma Shipbuilding Corporation
- Laid down: 13 November 1942
- Launched: 21 April 1943
- Fate: Transferred to Royal Navy 27 September 1943

United Kingdom
- Name: HMS Shah
- Namesake: Shah of Persia
- Commissioned: 27 September 1943
- Decommissioned: 7 February 1946
- Identification: Pennant number D21
- Honours and awards: Burma 1945
- Fate: Returned to US ownership. Sold as merchant ship Salta; sold for scrap 1966
- Badge: On a Field Blue, a Shah's crown Gold.

General characteristics
- Class & type: Bogue-class escort carrier (US); Ruler-class escort carrier (UK)
- Displacement: 7,800 tons
- Length: 495 ft 7 in (151.05 m)
- Beam: 69 ft 6 in (21.18 m)
- Draught: 26 ft (7.9 m)
- Propulsion: Steam turbines, 1 shaft, 8,500 shp (6,300 kW)
- Speed: 18 knots (33 km/h)
- Complement: 890 officers and ratings
- Armament: 2 × 4-inch dual purpose anti-aircraft guns in single mounts; 16 × 40 mm Bofors guns in twin mounts; 20 × single 20 mm Oerlikon cannon in single and twin mounts
- Aircraft carried: 12–24

HMS Shah (D21) was an escort carrier which served in the British Royal Navy during World War Ii. She was laid down, under a contract let by the United States Maritime Commission, as MC Hull 254, at the Tacoma, Washington yard of the Seattle-Tacoma Shipbuilding Corporation, on 13 November 1942, and, sponsored by Mrs. C. T. Simard, was launched on 21 April 1943. She was commissioned into the U.S. Navy under the placeholder name of USS Jamaica (originally AVG-43, then later ACV-43, and finally CVE-43), transferred to Britain, decommissioned as a U.S. Navy ship, and recommissioned as HMS Shah, all on the same day, 27 September 1943.

== Design and description ==
HMS Shah was a Ruler-class escort carrier in the Royal Navy. The ships in this class were, like those of the preceding Attacker-class carriers, built on keel-up derivatives of Type C3 merchant ship hulls, incorporating better internal subdivision and other changes that left them displacing slightly more than their commercial predecessors. They had greater aircraft capacities than any preceding escort carriers. Each had a complement of 646 officers and ratings and an overall length of 492 feet 3 inches (150.0 m), a beam of 69 feet 6 inches (21.2 m) and a draught of 25 ft 6 in (7.8 m). Propulsion was provided by two boilers, each powering one Allis Chalmers steam turbine, which together turned one shaft which delivered 9,350 brake horsepower (6,970 kW), enough to propel the ship at 16.5 knots (30.6 km/h; 19.0 mph).

Aircraft facilities included a small combined bridge–flight control island on the starboard side, well forward; two aircraft lifts that measured 43 by 34 feet (13.1 m × 10.4 m); one aircraft catapult, forward and to port; and nine arrestor wires. Aircraft could be housed in a 260 by 62 feet (79.2 m × 18.9 m) hangar below the flight deck. Armament comprised two 5-inch, 38-caliber dual-purpose guns in single mounts (which were apparently not swapped out for British-made types, as in earlier carriers), sixteen 40 mm Bofors anti-aircraft guns in twin mounts, and twenty 20 mm Oerlikon anti-aircraft cannon in single mounts. Her operational complement initially consisted entirely of c.18 Grumman/General Motors Avengers, but eventually, as she began to see deployments into situations offering greater potential for meeting enemy aircraft, as many as 12 fighters-- Grumman/General Motors Wildcats or Grumman Hellcats (sources vary)--were swapped in for some of the Avengers. Mention is also made of Supermarine Sea Otters serving aboard in mid-1945.

== Military service as Shah ==
Commanded by William John Yendell, after sea trials were completed the ship was modified in Canada to optimize it for convoy defence, and was earmarked for service in the Indian Ocean. Her modifications were completed at the end of the year, and she sailed from Vancouver for San Francisco to take on her complement of operational aircraft, 12 Grumman Avengers of 851 Naval Air Squadron and a flight of Grumman Wildcats, along with a cargo of Curtiss P-40s to be ferried to Cochin, in present-day India. From San Francisco she sailed to Williamstown, Melbourne, Australia. After resupplying she continued in this cargo-laden condition to Cochin and Colombo.

Her duties were chiefly convoy defence and trade protection against German U-boats operating in the Indian Ocean. Operating from a shore base at Trincomalee, she took an active part in the war, heading the hunter-killer group which sank U-198 in the Indian Ocean on 12 August 1944. Alerted to the submarine's presence in the area, 851's Avengers located the U-boat and attempted to attack her; her attack failed but she was able to direct the other ships in the group--her fellow Ruler-class carrier HMS Begum, the River-class frigate HMS Findhorn, and the Black Swan-class sloop HMIS Godavari--to the target, where they sank it using depth chargesd.

Shah was transferred to the East Indies Fleet and then refitted in Durban before taking part in the Burma campaign in 1945. Having suffered several aircraft losses on patrol and landing accidents, her complement was augmented around this time by a flight of Grumman Hellcats. During April and May 1945 she participated in Operation Bishop, launching patrols and strikes against Nicobar preparatory to the invasion of Rangoon. Soon after, she was tasked with the search for the Japanese cruiser Haguro. Mechanical problems with the catapult resulted in most of 851's Avengers being sent to HMS Emperor in exchange for Hellcats from 800 and 804 Squadron. A serious landing accident by one of those Hellcats effectively removed Shah from operations on 11 May. Nonetheless 851's Avengers, flying from Emperor, were able to locate and damage Haguro, prior to her sinking by the 26th Destroyer Flotilla in Operation Dukedom.

The Hellcats that survived the earlier landing accident were flown off Shah and she briefly returned to Ceylon and Bombay for refitting and training. Collecting surviving Avengers from 851 and 845 Squadrons, plus Hellcats and a Walrus for support and recovery during landing operations, in August she sailed to join Operation Zipper on the Malay coast, only to be stood down en route when Japan capitulated.

Disembarking her aircraft at Trincomalee on 26 August, she then sailed to the Clyde naval base via Aden and the Suez Canal where she was prepared for return to the United States. Arriving at Norfolk on 16 October, she was formally handed over to the United States on 26 November1945.

== Merchant service as Salta ==
The ship was converted into a merchant vessel at the Newport News Shipbuilding Company's yard in Virginia and sold into civilian service in Argentina, on 27 June 1947, as Salta, after an Argentine city. In 1963 she was the first ship on scene at the rescue of passengers and crew from the Greek liner Lakonia when it caught fire in the Atlantic. At the time she was under the command of Captain José Barrere, on its way from Genoa, Italy, to Buenos Aires. Salta rescued 475 people and took aboard most of Lakonia's lifeboats. Salta was scrapped in Buenos Aires in 1966.
