= Gambling in Maine =

Legal forms of gambling in the U.S. state of Maine include parimutuel wagering on horse races, sports betting, the Maine Lottery, two casinos, and charitable gaming.

== Horse racing ==
Parimutuel wagering on harness racing is permitted at two commercial racetracks, Hollywood Casino Hotel & Raceway in Bangor and First Tracks Cumberland, which operates at the Cumberland Fairgrounds in Cumberland. Brief harness racing meets of up to eight days each also occur at six agricultural fairs throughout the state, from July to October, with parimutuel wagering offered.

Wagering is also offered at three off-track betting parlors located in Lewiston, Sanford, and Waterville, and by advance-deposit wagering.

== Casinos ==
Maine law allows two casinos: Hollywood Casino in Bangor and Oxford Casino in Oxford. The two casinos had a total annual net gaming revenue of $165 million as of 2022.

Slot machines at horse tracks were approved in a statewide referendum in 2003, but were rejected by voters in the city of Scarborough, leading to Bangor having the only permitted casino. The casino in Oxford was approved by a statewide referendum in 2010. The racino law was amended the following year to allow table games at Bangor.

== Sports betting ==
Maine enacted legislation authorizing sports betting in 2022. Under the new law, the right to offer mobile sports betting was granted exclusively to Maine's federally recognized tribes. Tribes will be able to partner with third parties to operate their online sportsbook platforms, but would still have to retain a significant portion of the overall revenue. Retail sports betting will also be permitted in person at Maine's two commercial casino locations, at commercial racetracks, and at off-track betting facilities.

== Charitable gaming ==
Maine law permits many types of community organizations to conduct various games of chance for fundraising purposes, including bingo (with prizes up to $400), raffles (with prize values up to $75,000), and card games (generally with a maximum bet of $1 per hand).

== Indian gaming ==
State law grants Maine's four federally recognized tribes the exclusive right to offer mobile sports betting, as well as the right to conduct high-stakes bingo games with unlimited prize values.

In January 2026, Gov. Janet Mills allowed Legislative Document 1164 to become law without her signature, allowing Maine's four federally recognized Wabanaki tribes to offer online casino gaming within the state.

The tribes do not have casino gaming rights that tribes in other states possess, because the Maine Indian Claims Settlement Act subjects the tribes' lands to state law, and excludes the Indian Gaming Regulatory Act from applying in the state.

== Lottery ==
The Maine Lottery offers scratch-off and drawing games, including the multi-state Powerball and Mega Millions games.

== See also ==
- Gambling in the United States
