= William John Yendell =

Royal Navy Rear Admiral (1903–1988)

Rear Admiral William John Yendell CB (1903–1988) was a British Royal Navy officer.

He was head of the naval mission to Greece up to its invasion by Axis forces, and after evacuation served as a staff officer in Alexandria until 1943. In October of that year until the closing months of World War II he commanded the escort carrier HMS Shah.

After the war, apart from a few brief commands (HMS Glasgow, HMS Superb), he was based at the Admiralty becoming director of naval ordnance in 1951 and assistant chief of naval staff (warfare) in 1954, as well as naval ADC to Queen Elizabeth II. He retired in 1957.
