= Hollywood Casino Hotel & Raceway Bangor =

Casino and harness racing track in Maine, US

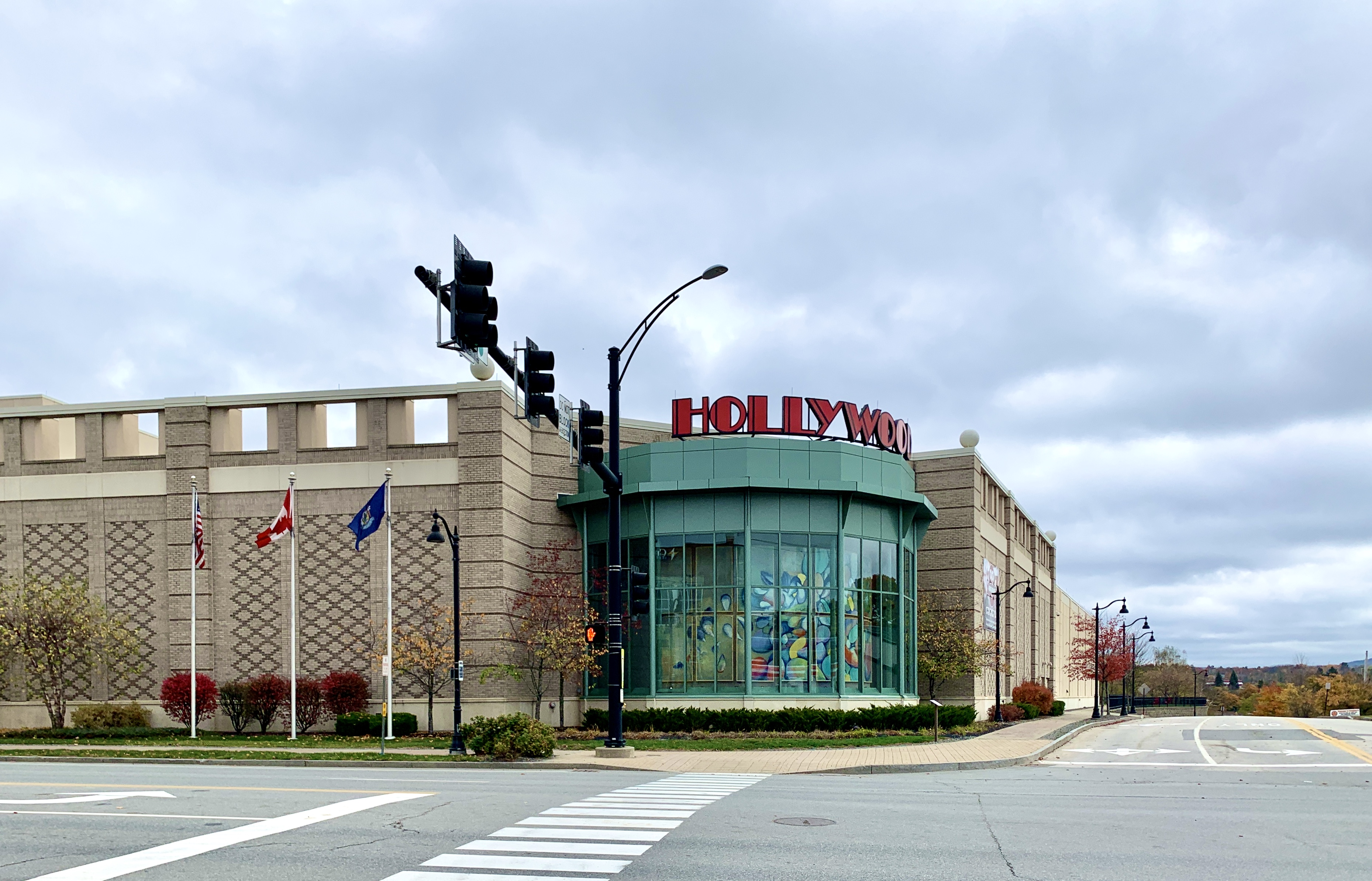

- Location in the Bangor Waterfront District
- Interactive map of Hollywood Casino Hotel & Raceway Bangor
- Location: Bangor, Maine, United States; 500 Main St; 44°47′17″N 68°46′37″W
- Opened: November 1, 2005
- Theme: Cinema of the United States
- No. of rooms: 152
- Notable restaurants: Hops House 99, Zombie Dogz
- Casino type: Racino
- Owner: Gaming and Leisure Properties
- Operating license holder: Penn Entertainment
- Architect: WBRC Architects and Engineers
- Previous names: Hollywood Slots
- Renovated in: Moved facilities in 2007
- Website: hollywoodcasinobangor.com

Hollywood Casino Hotel & Raceway Bangor (previously Hollywood Slots and Bangor Raceway) is a casino and harness racing track in Bangor, Maine. It is owned by Gaming and Leisure Properties and operated by Penn Entertainment. It was the first licensed slots facility in the state, and became the first casino to be licensed in the state of Maine when it added table games to its facilities in 2012. The only other licensed casino in the state is Oxford Casino in Oxford, Maine. As of 2024, the casino had 14 tables and 715 slot machines. The hotel has 152 rooms, including four suites.

Taxes on the casino's revenue contributed approximately $12 million to the City of Bangor's construction of the Cross Insurance Center, located across the street from the Casino. Eastern Maine Community College now offers classes to students on how to deal for various casino card games, which are partially sponsored by the casino.

== History ==
Harness racing was begun at Bangor Raceway in 1883. In 1890, in an exhibition mile at the track, the champion trotter Nelson set a world record of 2:15 1/4 for a mile on a half-mile track. The park was originally owned by Joseph P. Bass but was transferred by bequest after his death to the City of Bangor in 1932. In April 1949, the track's wooden grandstand was lost to fire, but was soon replaced with a 3,000-seat concrete grandstand that is still in use today. In the early 1990s, the Bangor City Council voted to turn the park's harness racing operations over to a private investment group, led by Fred Nichols, due to financial losses from operating the track.

The property became a racino when Penn National Gaming (now Penn Entertainment) acquired Bangor Historic Track and its slots license from casino developer Shawn Scott following a statewide referendum the approving slots gaming at parimutuel racing facilities. Penn National initially acquired a nearby local restaurant and converted it into a temporary facility housing 475 slot machines, as well as off-track betting, while construction began on a larger facility across the street on the Penobscot River. In 2007, the casino moved into the new facility and expanded to house 1,000 slot machines. In 2012, Penn National was allowed to add traditional casino table games to its collection of slots.

== See also ==
- Gambling in Maine
