= Gambling in Iowa =

Industry in Iowa

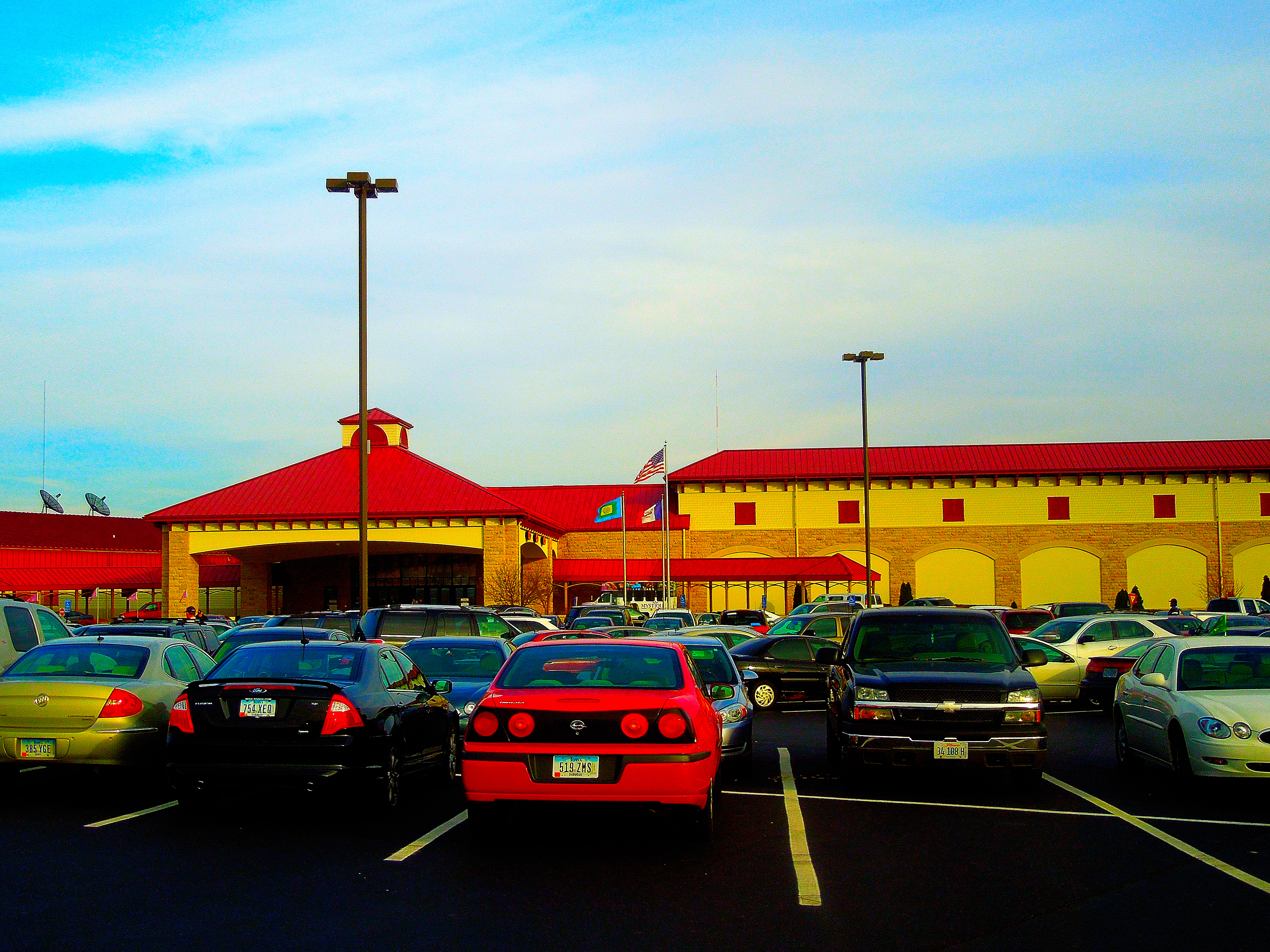
The Q Casino found in Dubuque, Iowa

In the state of Iowa, gambling has been legalized and expanding since the ratification of a constitutional amendment in 1972. Before then, the constitution prohibited the gambling within the state. As of 2018, gambling is Iowa's largest tourist attraction, making $1.476 billion per year.

== History ==
In the 1846 Iowa Constitution, there was a provision stating that the state may not sanction lotteries or lottery tickets. Lottery was defined as any sort of gambling game. In the 19th century, casinos on riverboats were common. This was because Iowa was the first state to legalize riverboats.

On September 7, 1971, a catholic pastor was charged with hosting a gambling house. The church held a Labor Day picnic with one of the main draws being alcohol and gambling, though only the gambling had been charged. The gambling equipment and $600 were seized. Governor Robert D. Ray announced on September 9 that he intended to remove the constitutional ban on gambling.

Gambling was legalized after an election in November 1972. The amendment in question received 68% of the vote.

Two years after gambling became legal, several limitations came into effect. A ban on craps, blackjack, and other games along with bookmaking offices came into effect.

== Greyhound racing ==
Iowa has banned using live bait to train greyhounds for racing.

== Online ==
Online sports betting is legal in Iowa. However, online casinos are not.

== Iowa Lottery ==
The Iowa Lottery signed into legislation April 18, 1985. As of the fiscal year ending in June 30, 2022, the Iowa Lottery was making $430 million in sales with over $97 million funding state programs.

== See also ==
- List of casinos in Iowa
- Gambling in the United States
