= Gambling in Connecticut =

Legal forms of gambling in the U.S. state of Connecticut include two Indian casinos (Foxwoods and Mohegan Sun), parimutuel wagering, charitable gaming, the Connecticut Lottery, and sports betting.

== Casinos ==
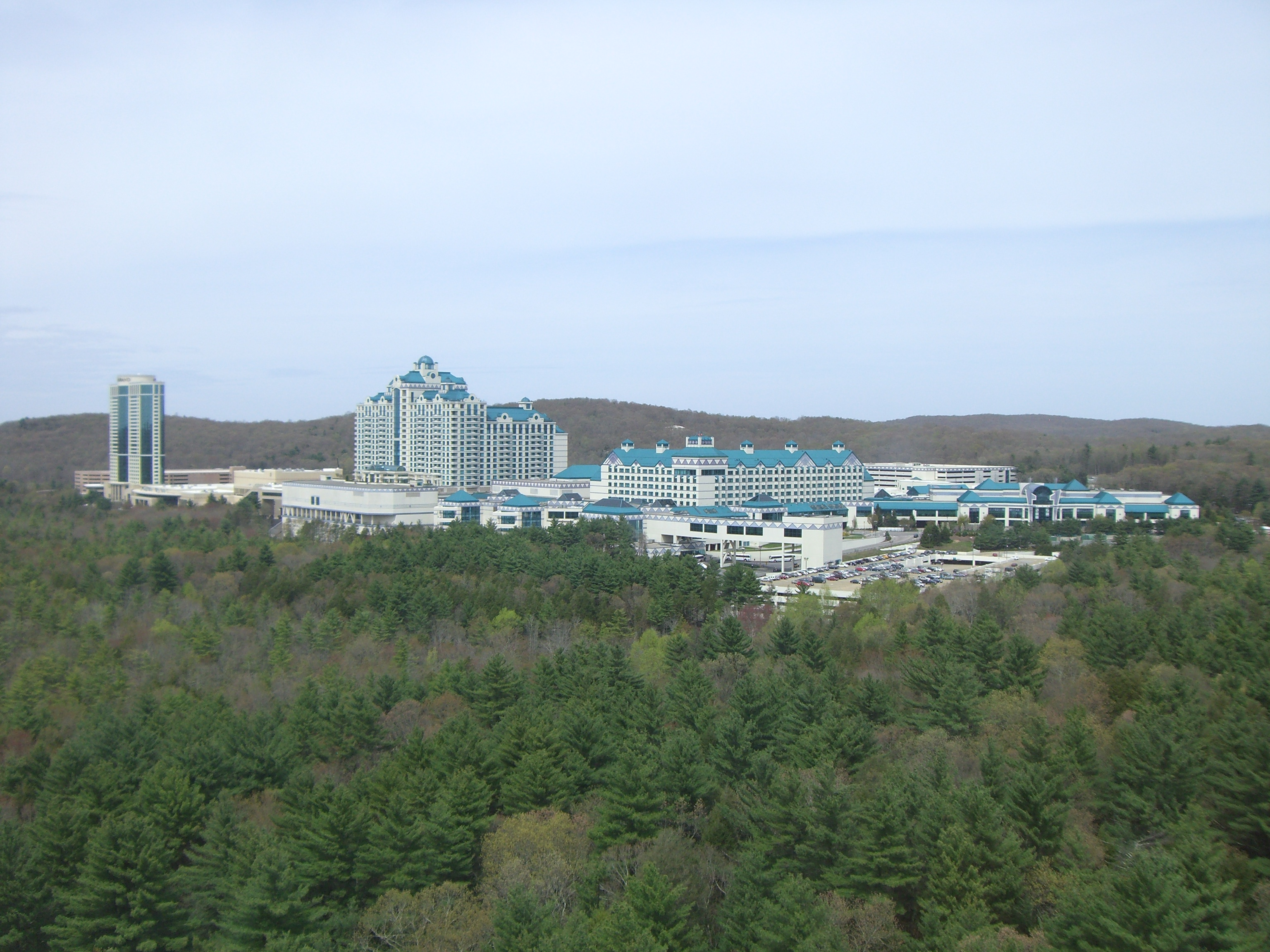
Foxwoods Casino

Connecticut has two Indian casinos, Foxwoods Resort Casino in Ledyard and Mohegan Sun in Uncasville. They are operated on tribal lands under the federal Indian Gaming Regulatory Act by the state's two federally recognized tribes, the Mashantucket Pequot Tribe and the Mohegan Tribe, respectively. A third casino, called the Tribal Winds Casino, was to be jointly owned by the two tribes. It was planned in East Windsor but the deal was scrapped in 2022 when a sports gambling agreement was reached. Any plans to build a casino have been put on hold until 2032.

The tribes pay 25 percent of their slot machine revenue to the state, in exchange for the state maintaining its prohibition on the machines outside of the two casinos. As of the 2016-17 fiscal year, the two casinos had a total annual slot handle of $13.2 billion, with winnings of $1.1 billion.

Tribal gaming began in 1986 with the opening of a high-stakes bingo parlor on the Mashantucket Pequot reservation, after a court ruled that state bingo regulations did not apply on the tribe's sovereign land. The operation expanded to include table games in 1992, and slot machines in 1993. The Mohegan Tribe, having gained federal recognition in 1992, opened its casino in 1996.

== Parimutuel wagering ==
Parimutuel wagering on horse racing, greyhound racing, and jai alai is offered at nine off-track betting (OTB) parlors around the state operated by MyWinners, part of Sportech, and also at the two tribal casinos. The MyWinners operation had a total annual handle of $168 million as of 2015, with $125 million paid out for winning bets. Two greyhound tracks and three jai alai frontons have previously operated in Connecticut.

Horse racing and off-track betting were legalized in 1971. Jai alai and dog racing were added the following year. A horse track named Connecticut Park was proposed to be built in Wolcott, but was canceled in the late 1970s after failing to gain state approvals. The state's OTB operation opened for business in 1976. Jai alai frontons opened in Hartford and Bridgeport in 1976, and in Milford in 1977. The Bridgeport and Hartford frontons closed in 1995, and the Milford fronton followed in 2001. Plainfield Greyhound Park operated from 1976 to 2005 in Plainfield; Shoreline Star Greyhound Park opened at the former jai alai fronton in Bridgeport in 1996, and closed in 2005.

== Charitable gaming ==
Eligible non-profit organizations are permitted to conduct several games of chance for fundraising purposes, including bingo, raffles, carnival games (referred to as bazaars) and pull-tabs (referred to as sealed tickets). As of 2015, charitable games in the state had total gross annual revenues of $32.7 million, with the organizations making a profit of $10.6 million.

The law allowing charitable bingo was enacted in 1939. It was expanded to allow bazaars and raffles in 1955, and sealed tickets in 1987. Las Vegas nights, featuring casino games like blackjack and roulette, were legalized in 1972, but this was repealed in 2003 in an effort to block the opening of more tribal casinos in the state.

== Lottery ==
The Connecticut Lottery offers scratchcard games and draw games, including the multi-state Powerball and Mega Millions games. As of 2015, the lottery had annual gross sales of $1.1 billion, with $707 million paid out as prizes.

The legislature authorized the lottery in 1971, as part of the same bill that legalized parimutuel wagering. Lottery sales began in 1972.

== Sports betting ==
Sports betting was legalized in the state in 2021, to be conducted by the two tribal casinos and the Connecticut Lottery. Foxwoods and Mohegan Sun offer betting online and at their casinos, in partnership with DraftKings and FanDuel, respectively. The lottery, in partnership with Rush Street Interactive, offers online betting, and offers sportsbooks at several of the Sportech OTB venues.
