= Operation Bishop =

Law enforcement operation in Texas

- Operation name: Operation Bishop
- Type: Anti-gambling effort
- Scope: Domestic and Brownsville, Texas, U.S

Mission
- Objective: to end illegal gambling and associated money laundering schemes in the border city of Brownsville, Texas.

Timeline
- Date begin: April 2013
- Date end: Ongoing (as of 2016)

Operation Bishop is the codename for a long-term effort by state and federal police forces to end illegal gambling and associated money laundering schemes in the border city of Brownsville, Texas. Since its beginning in April 2013, Operation Bishop has focused on "eight-liner" establishments, where customers play inexpensive slot machines, known as "maquinitas", and so far have made over 60 arrests, seized over $1,000,000 and dozens of slot machines, in more than 70 police raids. It has been speculated that the illegal gambling operations in Brownsville may be used by Mexican drug cartels in the area to launder large quantities of illegitimate revenue.

Texas authorities report that the "eight-liner" industry produces approximately $300,000,000 annually, and is then believed to exit Cameron County or even Texas altogether.

== Raids ==
In late September 2015, during the 50th raid of Operation Bishop, Cameron County officials seized 35 motherboards used in the maquinitas and more than $1,000 at a site on King's Highway in Brownsville. In October of the same year, investigators "uncovered a series of [illegal] gambling operations set inside re-purposed 18-wheeler trailers."

Police in Brownsville busted three more illegal gambling operations in raids on March 15, 2016.

== See also ==
- Mexican drug war
