= Hinsdale Greyhound Park =

Greyhound racing track in Hinsdale, New Hampshire

- Interactive map of Hinsdale Greyhound Park
- Former names: Hinsdale Raceway
- Location: 688 Brattleboro Road, Hinsdale, New Hampshire
- Coordinates: 42°48′39.4″N 72°31′41.8″W
- Owner: Joseph Sullivan
- Surface: Sand

Construction
- Opened: 1958
- Closed: 2008

Hinsdale Greyhound Park was a greyhound racing track in Hinsdale, New Hampshire, United States, that operated from 1958 to 2008.

It was originally named Hinsdale Raceway, a horse racing track that began operation in 1958. During its heyday, it drew thousands of spectators from all over New England and even Montreal in Canada. Harness racing prospered at Hinsdale throughout the 1960s, 1970s and early 1980s, until track management, in an attempt to reduce costs, converted the facility to year-round greyhound racing in 1985. This was popular too for several years, but competition from casinos in neighboring states slowly eroded the fan base, and the last several years of operation were a financial struggle.

In late 2008, the track finally succumbed and ceased operations under a mountain of debt. Five years after closing, the bankruptcy case was still ongoing, with "more than 500 bettors" unable to "access money in their accounts, which totaled an estimated $500,000. Additional creditors claimed the track owned them more than a $1 million in total."

In 2013, the racetrack was demolished.

== See also ==
- Seabrook Greyhound Park
