= Snow snake =

Native American winter sport

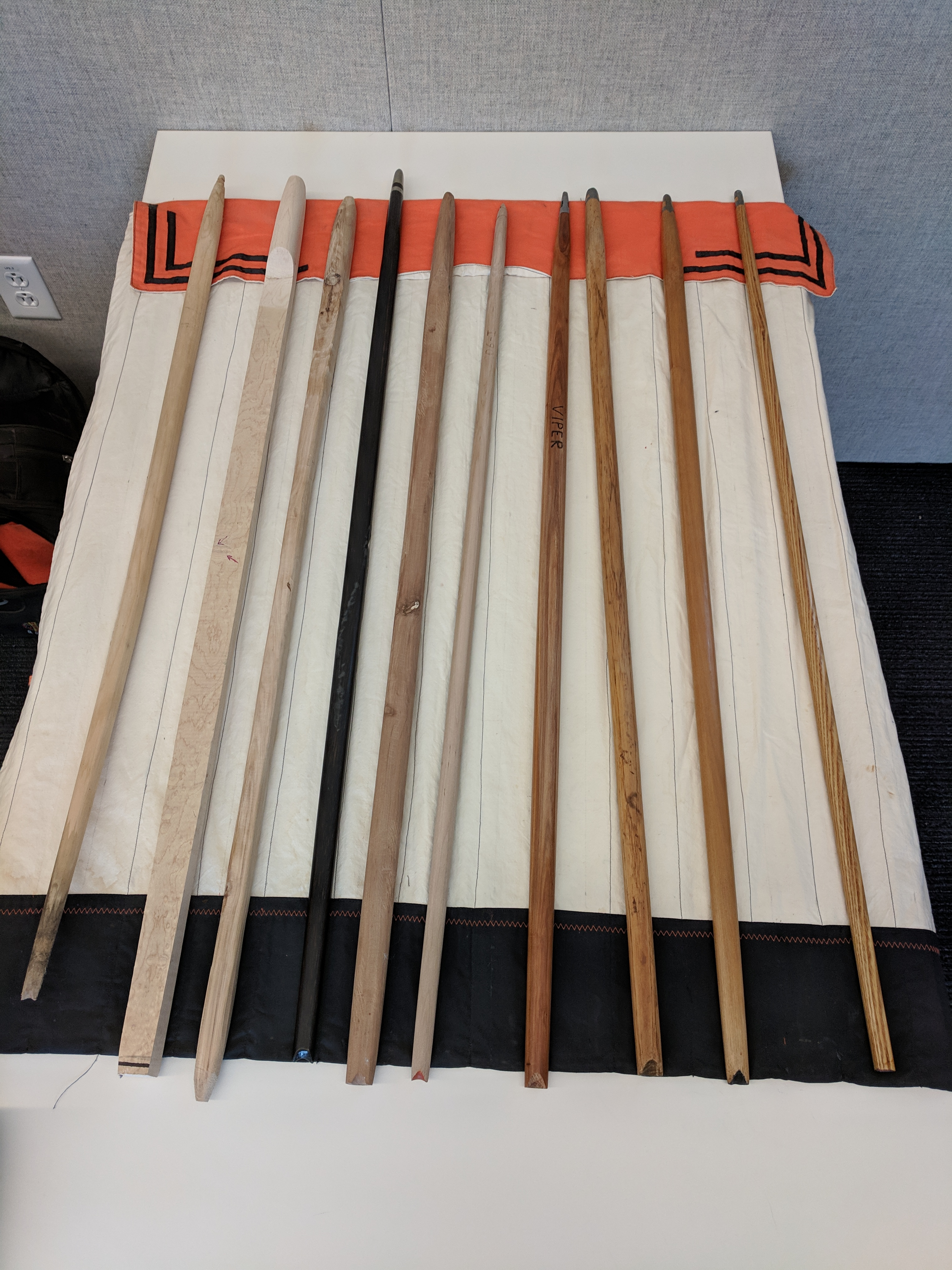

Characteristics
- Contact: No
- Type: Outdoor, winter

Presence
- Country or region: Great Lakes region of North America

Snow snake is an Indigenous winter sport traditionally played by numerous tribes in the Great Lakes region in the United States and Canada, including the Ojibwe, Sioux, Wendat, and Haudenosaunee people.

== Gameplay ==
A game of snow snake is played by four teams, called "corners", who compete in trying to throw their wooden "snow snakes" the furthest along a long trough, or track, of snow. The game is divided into rounds, and in a round each team gets four throws. At the end of each round, two points are awarded to the team of the person who made the furthest throw, and one point is awarded for the second furthest throw. Play continues until one of the teams wins, by achieving a certain predetermined number of points (usually 7 or 11).

There are two roles on a snow snake team: the Player, and the Goaler. The main role of a Goaler is to craft and maintain a team's wooden "snow snakes" in between games. The Goaler is also tasked with selecting which will be used for each throw during the game. A Player, meanwhile, is someone who throws the snow snakes during a game.

== Equipment ==
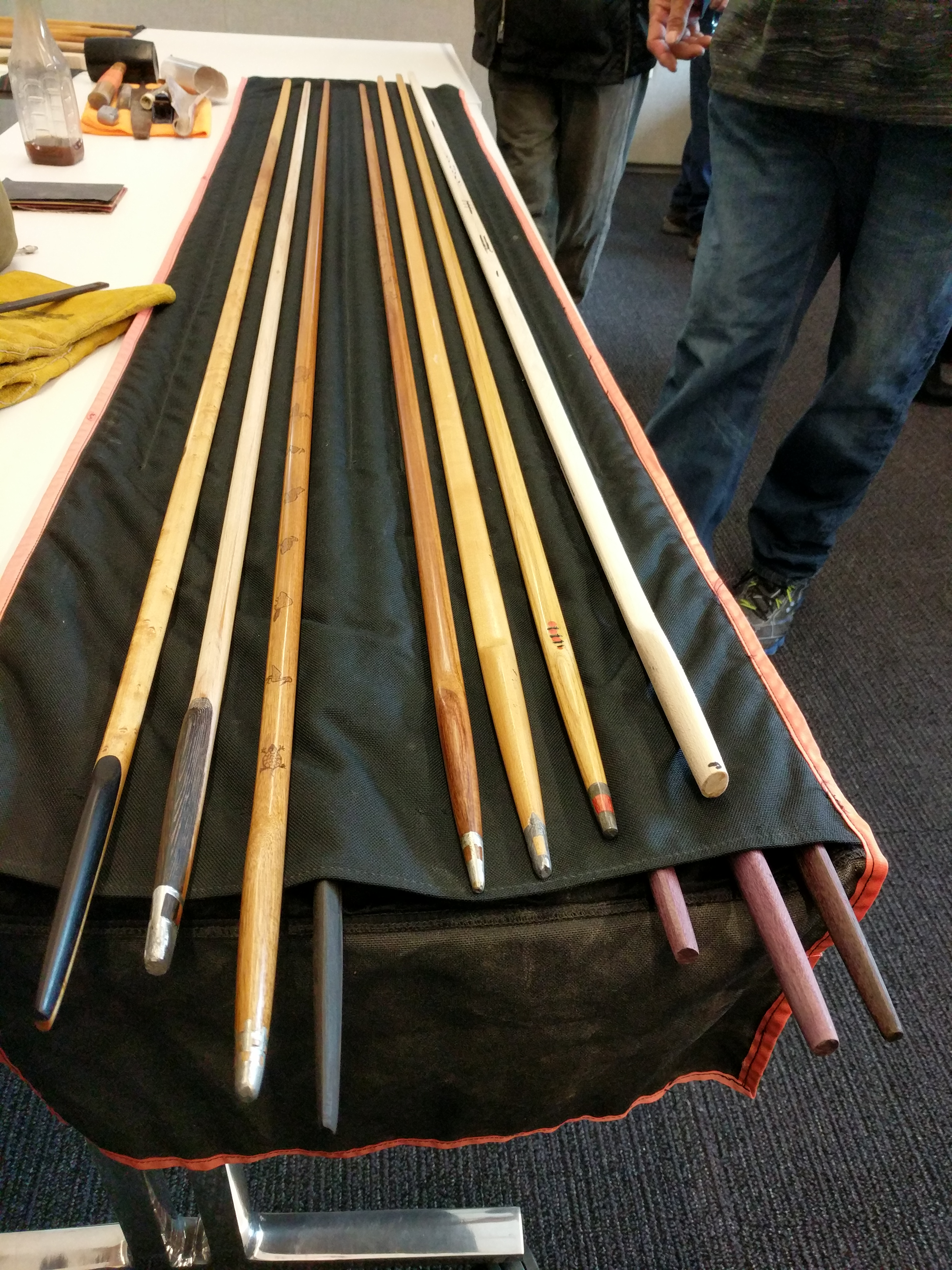
Full-size snow snakes at Ganondagan State Historic Site

The poles used in the game, collectively known as "snow snakes", have different names depending on their length. The smallest poles used are the six-inch-long "snow darts". The next size up is the three-foot-long "short snake", also known as a "mud cat". Longer poles are known only as "snow snakes", and can be anywhere from six to ten feet in length. Snow snakes can be made from a variety of materials. In the Sioux tribe, they were traditionally made of bone, with feathers trailing behind for symbolic decoration. Other tribes traditionally used native North American hardwoods, such as maple, oak, apple, hickory, and juneberry. In modern times, other hardwoods not traditionally available, such as ebony, have become popular materials for snow snakes. Many players customize their snow snakes by decorating them with colorful designs or adding minor modifications, such as waxing the wooden surface.

The trough, or track, that snow snakes are thrown down is typically five inches deep, rising up in a slope at the end where the players stand. In modern times, some groups will add obstacles like jumps or snow barriers to their tracks, for added interest.

== History ==
According to Haudenosaunee oral tradition, the game of snow snake dates back more than 500 years, to before the arrival of Europeans in North America. Originally a form of communication between villages, the throwing of "snow snakes" in a trough of snow developed into a competitive sport during lengthy winters when the long track was not used for communication. The name "snow snake" is said to have come from the serpentine wiggling motion of the poles as they slide down the icy track.

== See also ==
- Spearfishing
