= Seabrook Greyhound Park =

Defunct dog racing venue in the U.S. state of New Hampshire

- Location in New Hampshire Location in the United States
- Location: New Hampshire Route 107, Seabrook, New Hampshire
- Coordinates: 42.8944°N 70.9024°W
- Owner: Yankee Greyhound Racing Association

Construction
- Opened: July 2, 1973
- Closed: 2009 (for live racing)

Website
- livefreeandplay.com

Seabrook Greyhound Park was a greyhound racing track in Seabrook, New Hampshire, United States. Opened on July 2, 1973, the facility ended live racing in 2009, while continuing to offer simulcast wagering of races at other locations.

In 2019, the facility was purchased by Nevada-based Eureka Casino Resort. The property, renamed as The Brook, underwent a yearlong, multi-million dollar renovation and features a casino operating under the charitable gaming laws of the state, poker room, racebook and DraftKings sportsbook.

== See also ==
- Hinsdale Greyhound Park
