= Pull-tab =

Ticket for a gambling game

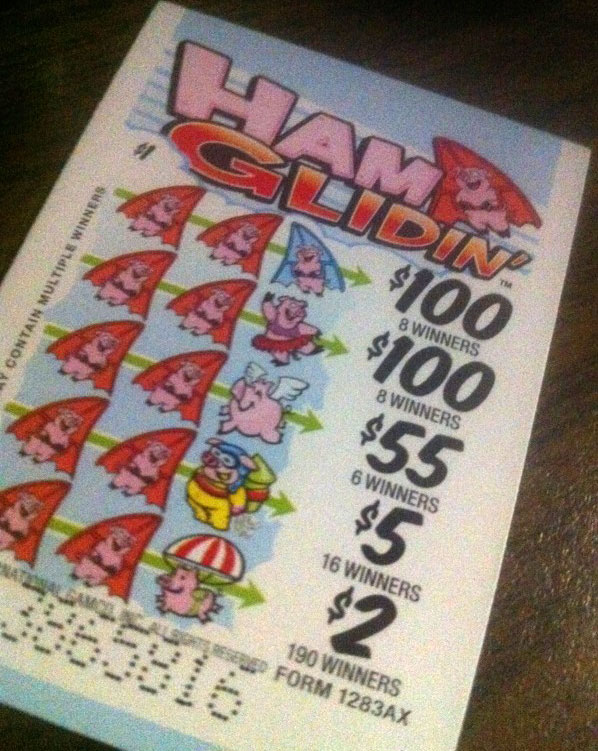
A pull-tab lotto ticket

A pull-tab is a gambling ticket for a pull-tab game. Other names for the game include Break-Opens, Nevada Tickets, Cherry Bells, Lucky 7s, Pickle Cards, Pickle Tickets, Instant Bingo, Bowl Games, or Popp-Opens.

Physical pull-tab tickets are multi-layered paper tickets containing symbols hidden behind perforated tabs. The player opens the perforated windows on the ticket to reveal a winning combination. The player turns in the winning ticket for a prize. Electronic analogues have also been created.

== Description ==
The game manager operates the game by selling tickets and distributing prizes. The tickets may be provided by mechanical pull-tab dispensers. Several different games may be offered for sale at any one time; each may have different prices and payouts. Pull-tabs are typically sold for 25¢, 50¢, $1, $2, $3, and $5 and have prizes as high as $5,000.

Pull tab games are unique among wagering games in that each game, when new, has a predetermined quantity of tickets/chances, which can range from 5,000 to 50,000 total, among which are a predetermined and fixed quantity of winning chances each of which rewards a predetermined prize value.

In many setups, a potential player can see through the transparent box roughly how many chances remain and they can view on the associated tally sheet how many major winners remain at any given time. When several major winners remain among a few chances, players buy as many as they can at a time. When no major winners remain among unsold tickets, the organization takes the game out of play or retires that deal and replaces it with a brand new deal. No other finite-probability based game provides more information to players about the status of the game.

The key attributes that make something a pull tab—electronic or paper—is the finite probability basis of having a predetermined quantity of chances among which there are a predetermined quantity of winners that pay a fixed and predetermined value of prize. Redemption of one losing chance actually does mean one chance closer to a winner. This opposed to, for instance, slots that operate on near-continuum probability premises, where each event is a separate activity without bearing on the next outcome and without having been influenced from past events.

=== Paper tickets ===
Each ticket has two sides. Typically, one side lists the winning combinations of symbols, the cash payout for each combination, the number of tickets that contain each winning combination, and the total number of tickets in the game. This information is generally also posted in a large printed sheet called a flare. The other side of the ticket contains the perforated tabs. After purchasing the ticket, the player pulls the perforated tabs to reveal their winnings, if any. Cash prizes may be claimed immediately.

=== Electronic tickets ===
An electronic pull tab is derived from paper pull tabs. The first electronic pull tab patent was filed in November 1990. The electronic game closely resembled pull tabs in that when new, there are a fixed and preset quantity of chances among which are a fixed quantity of winning chances of a predetermined prize value. Furthermore, it brings the unique features of allowing players to view the quantity of chances for each given prize value in each deal, as well as other pull tab features common to pull tab operations in Minnesota, Virginia, North Dakota, and other jurisdictions.

There have been several renditions of electronic pull tabs since 1990. The latest rendition was that authorized in Minnesota in the 2012 legislative session. These devices are available for use by state licensed charitable organizations. This version of an electronic pull tab uses a hand-held device, similar to a tablet computer, with a touch screen interface. All such devices are subject to control and monitoring from a central computer. Each device must have access to one or more finite sets of chances not to exceed a maximum number per set or "deal" as they are called in pull tab lingo. Sizes of the sets are under jurisdictional control and vary between maximums of 7,500 to 25,000. Among the chances are a predetermined quantity of winning and losing chances. Furthermore, the legislature stated that pull tab devices have "no spinning reels or other representations that mimic a video slot machine."

The Minnesota statute states an electronic pull-tab game means a pull-tab game containing "(a) facsimiles of pull-tab tickets that are played on an electronic pull-tab device."

The devices are linked wirelessly to a master computer within the bar or restaurant or to a central computer which controls many sites. In Minnesota, control computers are linked to the Minnesota Gambling Control Board, which oversees all of the devices.

== Legality ==
In 2010, approximately 20 states authorized and/or licensed the use of pull tabs. The largest volume state in terms of dollar value sold is Minnesota. In some states, no pull-tab game may offer a single prize higher than a certain amount and/or may not cost more than a certain amount. For instance, in Indiana, pull tabs cannot cost more than $1 per play, and no single prize can be more than $599.

In Minnesota as well as some other states, pull tabs are offered nightly from vending booths often called jar bars. All of the tickets in a game (called a "deal") are poured into a transparent container that has attached to it a "flare" or poster that displays all of the winning symbol combinations, the quantity of winning tickets at each reward level, the name of the game, etc. Also attached to the container is a tally sheet that shows a potential player exactly how many of the "major winners" (major winner is one equal to or above 50x the value of the price paid for the chance) remain in that particular game at a given time.

== See also ==
- Coin board
- Scratchcard
