= The Secret Life of the American Teenager season 5 =

The Secret Life of the American Teenager
- Season 5
- Season 5 promotional image
- No. of episodes: 24

Release
- Original network: ABC Family
- Original release: June 11, 2012 – June 3, 2013

Season chronology
- ← Previous; Season 4

The fifth and final season of The Secret Life of the American Teenager, an American television series created by Brenda Hampton, debuted on the ABC Family television network on Monday, June 11, 2012 at 8:00 PM. During its fourth season's hiatus, ABC Family announced on February 2, 2012, that the show would be renewed for a fifth season. The fifth season premiered on June 11, 2012, one week after the season 4 finale.

On October 10, 2012, the network announced this will be the series' final season.

== Cast ==
=== Main ===
- Shailene Woodley as Amy Juergens
- Ken Baumann as Ben Boykewich
- Greg Finley as Jack Pappas
- Daren Kagasoff as Ricky Underwood
- Megan Park as Grace Bowman
- Francia Raisa as Adrian Lee
- Steve Schirripa as Leo Boykewich

=== Special Guest Stars ===
- Mark Derwin as George Juergens
- Josie Bissett as Kathleen Bowman
- Molly Ringwald as Anne Juergens
- India Eisley as Ashley Juergens

=== Recurring ===
- Renee Olstead as Madison Cooperstein
- Camille Winbush as Lauren Treacy
- Anne Ramsay as Nora Underwood
- Michael Grant as Ethan
- Cierra Ramirez as Kathy
- Allen Evangelista as Henry Miller
- Amy Rider as Alice Valko
- Luke Zimmerman as Tom Bowman
- L. Scott Caldwell as Margaret Shakur
- Ana Mackenzie as Dylan
- Marielle Jaffe as Clementine

== Episodes ==
No. overall	No. in season	Title	Directed by	Written by	Original release date	U.S. viewers (millions)
98	1	"To Begin With ..."	Keith Truesdell	Brenda Hampton & Elaine Arata	June 11, 2012	1.67
When Amy and Ricky suddenly leave, suspicion arises that the two have gotten married. The school counselor gives Adrian her high school diploma and also tells her that Omar will be student teaching in the fall. Adrian empties her locker and leaves in a huff.
99	2	"Shotgun"	Gail Bradley	Brenda Hampton	June 18, 2012	1.68
Amy and Ricky return from their elopement; Grace shuns Adrian.
100	3	"I Do and I Don't"	Keith Truesdell	Brenda Hampton	June 25, 2012	1.56
Leo offers Ricky full employment after his graduation; Amy is asked to advise a new student at her school; Anne finally comes out to Mimsy; Ben admits his love for Amy. This is the last appearance of Ashley Juergens.
101	4	"Lies and Byes"	Gail Bradley	Brenda Hampton	July 9, 2012	1.25
Ricky is tired of being pretend married to Amy. They look like they're happy when they got pretend married. Lauren and Madison plan to throw Amy and Ricky a wedding party. Ben confesses to burning down the school.
102	5	"Past History"	Anson Williams	Brenda Hampton, Kelley Turk, & Courtney Turk	July 16, 2012	1.25
When Ricky, Jack, and Adrian start their first day of college, Ricky runs into an old friend; Ben learns he is not responsible for the school fire. Madison and Lauren want to throw a wedding for Amy and they aren't the only ones. Kathy, a pregnant freshman that Amy has been mentoring, connects with Ricky's dislike foster brother Ethan.
103	6	"Holy Rollers"	Lindsley Parsons III	Brenda Hampton & Jeffrey Rodgers	July 23, 2012	1.52
After an awkward meeting with George at church, Amy admits feeling that her family has broken apart. Ethan and Kathy continue to get to know each other.
104	7	"Girlfriends"	Keith Truesdell	Brenda Hampton & Paul Perlove	July 30, 2012	1.13
Kathy ends up in the wrong crowd when Amy tells her to make new friends.
105	8	"Setting Things Straight"	Gail Bradley	Brenda Hampton & Elaine Arata	August 6, 2012	1.10
When Amy notices an extremely happy Ricky meeting new friends that she doesn't know at college, she starts to get jealous of his busy and exciting life as a college student, causing a few problems in their relationship.
106	9	"Property Not For Sale"	Keith Truesdell	Brenda Hampton & Elaine Arata	August 13, 2012	1.06
Ben and Amy discuss their feelings on the relationship they share.
107	10	"Regrets"	Gail Bradley	Brenda Hampton & Elaine Arata	August 20, 2012	1.41
Adrian and Omar contemplate living together and Anne starts planning for Amy's wedding. Both Ben and Amy are accepted into Hudson University.
108	11	"Half Over"	Anson Williams	Brenda Hampton	August 27, 2012	1.54
The whole gang gathers at the hospital waiting to hear news on Jack after he is attacked. Adrian tells Omar about Mercy. Tension runs tight between Amy and Ricky who are questioning their marriage. The episode ends with Jack's parents crying and asking everyone to pray with them, leaving the viewer unsure of Jack's fate.
109	12	"Hedy's Happy Holiday House"	Keith Truesdell	Brenda Hampton	November 19, 2012	1.59
The gang find themselves celebrating the holidays at an abandoned toy warehouse, when Kathy suddenly goes into labor. Meanwhile, Grace wishes for a Christmas miracle with Jack, who is in a coma. A private moment between George and Kathleen is interrupted by a surprise visit from Anne and Mimsy.
110	13	"To Each Her Own"	Lindsley Parsons III	Brenda Hampton	March 18, 2013	1.33
Amy buys her wedding dress at a thrift shop, a purchase that meets with disapproval from others. Meanwhile, Anne begins to question Robbie's paternity; and Kathy is unsure if she wants to return home to Texas, so Ethan has a request for her parents.
111	14	"It's a Miracle"	Keith Truesdell	Brenda Hampton & Elaine Arata	March 25, 2013	1.19
Ben is in a euphoric mood, while driving Ethan to the airport he has an epiphany that Amy may not have been his first love. Omar leaves his student teaching job and proposes to Adrian. Ethan pleads with Kathy's parents to let her return home with him. Ricky confides in Dr. Fields about Amy's lack of enthusiasm towards their marriage - and Amy confides in Dr. Fields that she has other hopes and dreams. Meanwhile, Jack is restless with his injuries and enlists Grace's help. And, George meets with David to discuss Robbie's paternity.
112	15	"Untying the Knot"	Gail Bradley	Brenda Hampton & Jeffrey Rodgers	April 1, 2013	1.00
Anne is furious with George for lying about Robbie's paternity and calls off Amy and Ricky's wedding, inadvertently revealing the truth about their non-marriage. Jack refuses to get help as he struggles to come to terms with everything he's been through. Nora encourages George to work things out with Anne. Meanwhile, Ethan is not happy when Kathy and Chloe become friends.
113	16	"Shiny and New"	Gail Bradley	Paul Perlove	April 8, 2013	0.90
Amy and Ricky's relationship grows increasingly strained when Amy decides she wants to tour a college in New York. Leo questions Ricky about his friendship with Clementine. Jack goes to extreme lengths to protect himself with potentially devastating consequences. Adrian is not happy when Omar goes on a business trip without her, especially when she learns that Amy is on the same flight. George's need to distance himself from Anne leads him down a new career path. Meanwhile, Kathy offers to tutor Ethan in math but his pride keeps him from accepting her help.
114	17	"Fraid So"	Anson Williams	Kelley Turk & Courtney Turk	April 15, 2013	1.04
George and Reverend Stone insist that Jack see a therapist, but it's Adrian's advice that ultimately persuades him to go. Ricky feels Amy's absence as he juggles taking care of John with his work and school responsibilities. Kathy is stunned when she learns that her ex-boyfriend Don wants to see their baby. Amy realizes that she doesn't want to lose Ricky. Meanwhile, Leo secures an important business account.
115	18	"Money for Nothin"	Lindsley Parsons III	Brenda Hampton & Elaine Arata	April 22, 2013	1.03
Ricky tries to find a way to support Amy's dream of going to Hudson University, despite everyone's reservations about their relationship. Amy worries about her future when her meeting with the college counselor doesn't go quite like she'd expected. Adrian is furious when Omar asks her to move to New York. Jack considers suing the university for failing to prevent his attack. Meanwhile, Ethan is determined to learn the real reason Don is in town.
116	19	"Interference"	Keith Truesdell	Brenda Hampton & Elaine Arata	April 29, 2013	0.88
Ethan is convinced no adult actually uses algebra, but a chance meeting with Danica McKellar helps him look at math in a different light. Amy's frantic search for her missing wedding bands leads her to Ben, who advises her to break-up with Ricky before it's too late. George and Kathleen's romantic dinner is interrupted by an uninvited guest. Meanwhile, Mrs. Stone confronts Grace about her relationship with Jack
117	20	"First and Last"	Gail Bradley	Brenda Hampton & Elaine Arata	May 6, 2013	0.89
Amy and Ricky announce they will get married the day after Amy graduates from high school, but everyone is skeptical that the wedding will actually happen. Grace and Jack announce their engagement, but it's soon clear that Grace is having second thoughts about her decision. George and Kathleen are distracted from their secret plans when their mothers arrive for unexpected visits, but they eventually include their families in a special surprise. Meanwhile, Ethan is jealous when Kathy agrees to help Brian prepare for the spelling bee.
118	21	"All My Sisters With Me"	Keith Truesdell	Brenda Hampton & Jeffrey Rodgers	May 13, 2013	0.89
Amy, Adrian and Grace think about career dreams and marriage; Ricky gets upset when he discovers the meaning behind the date Amy selected for their wedding day. Meanwhile, Anne feels disconnected from her family and finds an ally with Kathleen; Ethan questions his relationship with Kathy; Leo worries that Ben has become fixated on Amy; And Chloe meets someone from her past.
119	22	"When Bad Things Happen to Bad People"	Gail Bradley	Brenda Hampton & Elaine Arata	May 20, 2013	0.99
Ricky and Amy are offered an apartment in New York, but Amy doesn't want to live in the same building as Ben. Adrian is devastated by Omar's decision and takes her pain out on Ricky and Jack. Ben refuses to give up on his dream of reuniting with Amy and makes a shocking confession to Alice. Ethan and Margaret have an honest conversation about his relationship with Kathy. Meanwhile, Clementine returns to town and pays Ricky a visit.
120	23	"Caught in a Trap"	Keith Truesdell	Brenda Hampton & Elaine Arata	May 27, 2013	0.85
Ricky suspects that Amy is hiding something and confronts her about their future. Ricky learns that Anne tried to convince Amy to go to New York without him. Everyone gives Ethan some much-needed advice about his love life. Amy is furious when she learns the lengths Ben will go to in order to win her back. Jack's commitment to Grace is tested, and Henry makes an important decision about his future. Meanwhile, Chloe finally puts her past demons to rest.
121	24	"Thank You And Goodbye"	Gail Bradley	Brenda Hampton	June 3, 2013	1.50
High school graduation is finally here, prompting everyone to reminisce about how much their lives have changed over the past few years. In the end, Amy and Ricky break up their engagement and decide that Ricky will raise John while Amy is away in college. Grace and Jack also break up their engagement and Jack realizes that he still has feelings for Madison. Adrian decides to move to New York to be with Omar while Ben decides to still fight for Amy while they are in New York. The series ends with a now single Amy leaving John and Ricky and locking the door to the butcher shop, and Ricky telling John, "And she lived happily ever after." In his bed time story, referring to Amy and kisses his head as he says, "And so will we.".
