= The Secret Life of the American Teenager season 2 =

The Secret Life of the American Teenager
- Season 2
- No. of episodes: 24

Release
- Original network: ABC Family
- Original release: June 22, 2009 – March 22, 2010

Season chronology
- ← Previous; Season 1 Next → Season 3

The second season of The Secret Life of the American Teenager, an American television series created by Brenda Hampton, debuted on the ABC Family television network on Monday, June 22, 2009, at 8:00PM. Season two regular cast members include Shailene Woodley, India Eisley, Daren Kagasoff, Francia Raisa, Kenny Baumann, Molly Ringwald, Mark Derwin, Megan Park, and Greg Finley II. Following the first season, Jorge Pallo and Luke Zimmerman were demoted to recurring guest stars. Jorge returned for a select number of episodes to wrap up his character's storyline and eventually departed the series after its January return.

Following the success of its first season, ABC Family announced on January 31, 2009, plans to renew Secret Life, following the cancellation of its hit sci-fi TV show, Kyle XY. The official press release was released on February 9 with ABC Family ordering 24 episodes for season two. Season 2 began with 12 episodes broadcast starting June 22, 2009. Though marketed as the season finale, the mid season finale aired on September 7, 2009, with the second half of the season returning on January 4, 2010. The second 12 episodes finished their run on March 22, 2010.

The season premiere of Secret Life brought in the largest audience for the show so far, with a record-breaking 4.68 million viewers. It brought in the second largest audience in adults 18–34 with 1.40 million viewers, behind season one's mid-season finale. 2.10 million adults 18–49 watched "The Big One" along with 1.60 million females between the ages 18 and 34. The season premiere remains the number one scripted original premiere of Summer 2009 in Adults 18–34. Furthermore, the mid-season premiere became ABC Family's most watched telecast of all time with viewers ages 12–34 with more than three million viewers watching. The mid-season premiere also brought in the show's second largest audience in total viewers, with more than 4.55 million people watching.

This season, Amy Juergens must deal with juggling motherhood and high school, while her family and friends experience relationship challenges of their own.

== Main cast ==
- Shailene Woodley as Amy Juergens
- Kenny Baumann as Ben Boykewich
- Mark Derwin as George Juergens
- India Eisley as Ashley Juergens
- Greg Finley as Jack Pappas
- Daren Kagasoff as Ricky Underwood
- Megan Park as Grace Bowman
- Francia Raisa as Adrian Lee
- Molly Ringwald as Anne Juergens

== Episodes ==
| No. overall | No. in season | Title | Directed by | Written by | Original release date | U.S. viewers (millions) |
|---|---|---|---|---|---|---|
| 24 | 1 | "The Big One" | Keith Truesdell | Brenda Hampton & Elaine Arata | June 22, 2009 | 4.68 |
Struggling to deal with motherhood, Amy suspects that Anne could be pregnant. Meanwhile, Ben decides he does not like Betty, with whom his father is seemingly in love, and expresses to Amy that he wants to have sex. While visiting John, Ricky finds out about Anne's pregnancy. Elsewhere, Grace tells Adrian that she is going to have sex with Jack but Adrian objects because she believes Grace isn't physically, mentally, or spiritually ready. Going against both her father's and Adrian's wishes, Grace has sex with Jack and later learns that her father died in a plane crash.
| 25 | 2 | "What's Done Is Done" | Gail Bradley | Brenda Hampton & Elaine Arata | June 29, 2009 | 3.30 |
Grace is plagued with guilt, thinking that she caused her father's untimely death. As her friends visit her, she refuses to change her opinion. Meanwhile, Ben tries to figure out where he fits in Amy's life when she refuses to let him babysit John. Grace's mom finds comfort when George visits her and Leo asks Betty to marry him.
| 26 | 3 | "Par for the Course" | Keith Truesdell | Brenda Hampton | July 6, 2009 | 2.85 |
Jack visits Grace to tell her once again that her father's death is not her fault. However, she refuses to see just and denies that she loves him. Ricky shows up at Amy's unexpectedly to lend her a hand but she receives his help unwillingly. Tired from running around, Amy reaches a breaking point. Meanwhile, wanting to have sex with Amy, a frustrated Ben quits his job at the butcher shop, Adrian believes God is telling her to quit having sex, and Ricky influences Grace to pay respects at her father's funeral.
| 27 | 4 | "Ciao" | Anson Williams | Brenda Hampton | July 13, 2009 | 3.13 |
Ashley and George lend a hand to Amy and Anne because of their hectic schedules. Meanwhile, Ben asks Leo for his job at the butcher shop back and plans to go to Italy for the summer, Grace goes back to school, gets back together with Jack and re-kindles her friendship with Adrian, Ricky becomes jealous as he asks Adrian for a commitment and makes her promise not to have sex with anyone but with him, and David proposes to Anne.
| 28 | 5 | "Born Free" | Keith Truesdell | Caroline Kepnes | July 20, 2009 | 3.02 |
Amy tells her mother that she will go to Italy with Ben, while Ashley delivers the message to Amy that Anne and David are engaged. Ricky contests Amy's going away with their son and Amy prompts Ben to rethink leaving her behind for the summer since Ricky is getting his own place. Grace tells Tom and Adrian that George told her that he lied about the vasectomy, and the secret flies around the school, only to arrive at Amy, who asks Ashley if George told the truth. Meanwhile, when Ricky asks Leo for a raise, Leo gives Ricky the apartment above the butcher shop and the raise, and David asks Anne to move into their own home.
| 29 | 6 | "The Summer of Our Discontent" | Lindsley Parsons III | Jeffrey Rodgers | July 27, 2009 | 3.10 |
Amy refuses to let Ben come over to say goodbye to her and John for the summer, but instead agrees to letting Ricky take John to his new apartment for the night. Marc Molina, the school guidance counselor, resigns at the end of the school year, while Anne starts pushing the divorce after she decides to accept David's marriage proposal. At the same time, Ashley reaches a breaking point urging George to tell Anne that the baby is his and Grace gets accepted into a medical school for the summer. Upon packing, Ben confronts Leo about Betty, but Leo reassures Ben that he trusts her because she has been honest. Meanwhile, Ricky stops over at Amy's house to pick up John for the night and Amy informs him her mom has gone with David for the night. Ben comes over to say goodbye to Amy. Ricky walks in on Ben and Amy kissing, but Ben gets angry when he discovers Ricky spent the night and leaves.
| 30 | 7 | "Summertime" | Keith Truesdell | Brenda Hampton | August 3, 2009 | 3.56 |
As everyone returns from their summer vacations, they all look to their futures and think about what happened between each other; Ben asks Leo if he needs to work on a relationship or if a relationship just happens, while George makes a big revelation to Anne by telling her that he lied about his vasectomy. David tells Amy that he will buy her a new car, while Ashley starts her first day of high school and meets a new gay friend, Griffin. Elsewhere, Ricky and Adrian don't really trust each other even though they promised to commit.
| 31 | 8 | "A New Kind of Green" | Anson Williams | Brenda Hampton | August 10, 2009 | 2.76 |
George takes matters into his own hands, hoping to smooth out his relationship with both David and Anne. Elsewhere, Amy asks Ricky if he knows anything about Ben having sex in Bologna and Grace and Adrian pay a visit to Ashley and George's house. Ricky learns about Adrian's plans and becomes upset that Adrian will be moving next door to Amy. Anne tells David that she won't move into his house, while David urges Anne to think through her and George's relationship, giving the car to Anne instead of Amy. At the same time, George allows Adrian's mother and father to see the house and Ben and Ashley suspect Amy and Ricky did more together than watch John over the summer, but Amy tells Ben that Ricky only slept over. Elsewhere, Adrian is confused about her relationship with Ricky and tries to resolve matters between them. Ricky makes it clear to Adrian that they are too young to commit and Grace invites Madison over, Griffin assures George that he is watching over Ashley, and Adrian informs an angry Amy that George accepted her father's offer on the house.
| 32 | 9 | "Hot Nuts" | Keith Truesdell | Brenda Hampton | August 17, 2009 | 3.30 |
Tom gets upset when Jack fixes a cabinet and Adrian's father asks her to improve her relationship with Amy. Elsewhere, Jack apologizes to Tom for trying to take his fatherly place and attempts to teach Tom to throw a football, but Tom intentionally throws the ball at Jack's groin. Ricky urges Adrian to undo the trouble she has made with Amy and threatens to never come near her again unless she does so. Ben receives a post card written in Italian and asks Leo if there is anything about sex written in the card. Leo urges Ben not to tell anyone, including himself, about Ben's doings in Italy. Meanwhile, Amy remains angry at Adrian and refuses to accept her many half ridden apologies and Ricky asks Amy if she thinks that they could ever be in a relationship together, but Amy declares that she loves Ben and doesn't trust Ricky. Ricky responds to Amy that he loves Adrian. Anne comes back from a date, who happens to be George. Together, they tell Ashley that Anne is having a boy.
| 33 | 10 | "Knocked Up, Who's There?" | Anson Williams | Brenda Hampton | August 24, 2009 | 3.21 |
Ben meets a girl named Heather, who is pregnant, and asks him to hang out with her over the weekend. Grace believes that she and Jack should talk at a Teen Abstinence Group at her church, presenting their reasons why to wait to have sex. Elsewhere, Anne is put on bed rest and George tells Amy not to go out with Ben, but Amy refuses to listen to her father, believing he is not the boss of her. Meanwhile, George gets a dog, which upsets Anne, Amy fails to go out with Ben for the night, Heather and Ben go out on a friend to friend basis, and Ben decides that he is not the right friend for her. Ricky tells Adrian that he doesn't see himself marrying and raising a family with anyone, including her nor Amy, in the future. Adrian tells Ricky she wants to openly see other people. Amy tells Heather that she and her family will be there for Heather when the baby arrives if she needs them, and thanks George for being there for her throughout her own pregnancy.
| 34 | 11 | "Cramped" | Keith Truesdell | Brenda Hampton | August 31, 2009 | 3.11 |
George makes a room in the garage for Ashley, sparking jealousy in Amy, while Adrian finishes packing her things, preparing to move into George and Ashley's old house. Betty tells Ben that she will be moving into his and Leo's house and Ashley asks Ricky to go to Betty's garage sale while George watches Anne. Ricky suggests to ask her father, but Ashley decides that she should leave a note instead. At the same time, Amy becomes furious when her and George suspect that Ricky went on a date with Ashley so he could have sex with her and Grace's mom tells Grace and Tom that she met a man. Grace disapproves without hesitation, but Jack thinks that it would make her mom happier. Tired of being judged and under credited for taking care of both Amy and John, Ricky reaches a breaking point, and Adrian tells Ricky that they both need therapy if they are to make things better between them.
| 35 | 12 | "Be My, Be My Baby" | Anson Williams | Brenda Hampton & Jeffrey Rodgers | September 7, 2009 | 3.56 |
Grace remains upset with her mother dating a younger guy. Meanwhile, Adrian and Ricky both go to therapy where, Adrian reveals her first time having sex and why she wants a commitment. Elsewhere, Griffin encourages Ashley to make up with Amy, Anne goes into labor, and George delivers the baby. Ben asks Leo to get engaged with Amy, and Leo tells Betty that they will plan a wedding. The family decides upon the name Robert for Anne's new boy, and Grace tells her mother that she is breaking up with Jack. In the meantime, Ben questions if he loves Amy, while Amy thinks she should start over.
| 36 | 13 | "You Don't Know What You've Got..." | Keith Truesdell | Teleplay by : Chris Olsen & Jeff Olsen; Story by : Brenda Hampton | January 4, 2010 | 4.55 |
While Lauren and Madison suspect Ben and Amy's breakup, Ben's friend from Italy, Maria, visits. While Amy and Anne take a mother/daughter vacation, Ben, Ricky, Jack, Grace, Adrian, Ashley, Griffin, Lauren, Madison, Henry, and Alice all skip school, only to be pursued by the new guidance councilor, Dr. Bink. The gang meet at the beach, where many discuss their relationships. Elsewhere, Amy and Ricky's relationship become strained when Ricky decides he wants to see his son after Amy's seemingly endless vacation staying with Mimzy (Anne's mom), Adrian's mom takes a job offer in New York, only to have Adrian struggle with the decision to stay with her father and go with her mother, and upon the arrival back at school, the gang's parents explain their mistakes so their son or daughter will not make the same ones.
| 37 | 14 | "Til It's Gone" | Gail Bradley | Teleplay by : Elaine Arata & Jeffrey Rodgers; Story by : Brenda Hampton | January 11, 2010 | 3.11 |
Still staying with Mimzy, Amy and Anne go grocery shopping. While at the store, Anne's ex-boyfriend from high school, Josh, asks Anne to kiss him and Amy meets Jimmy who is the son of Anne's ex-boyfriend. Ashley and Griffin have a sleepover and talk about Griffin's sexuality, while Ben regrets having Maria over before she goes home to Italy. Elsewhere, Ricky takes Mac's (a boy Adrian previously slept with) girlfriend, Zoe, to his apartment and has sex with her, and Amy drives home with John after getting her license. Tom tells Jack that Grace is having sex with herself while Kathleen's Jewish boyfriend Jeff, tells her that he loves her. Meanwhile, Adrian finds out what Ricky did the previous night.
| 38 | 15 | "Loved & Lost" | Keith Truesdell | Teleplay by : Elaine Arata & Jeffrey Rodgers; Story by : Brenda Hampton | January 18, 2010 | 2.97 |
After finding out Ricky has cheated, Adrian throws her phone at the butcher shop window, prompting Ricky to confront her after he's approached by Bunny over the incident. Ricky demands that she pay the fine and Adrian fears her father will find out. She turns to Tom who breaks up with Tammy because he thinks that after loaning her money, they will marry. Meanwhile, Amy tells Ben to quit delaying to act on his intention to break up with her and Jack tells Grace that he is dating Madison. Remorseful for cheating, Ricky decides to take responsibility for the broken window. He also asks Ben if he is sure about breaking up with Amy. Maria kisses Ben, while Amy tells Ben she hopes they could still be friends. Adrian's father discovers Adrian's financial situation causing him to advise Adrian. He explains that Ricky's cheating is a result of Adrian's refusal to make peace with the mother of his son. Trying to mediate things with Amy, Ricky tells her that he is afraid that if she ever leaves, he will never see John again. Amy finally acknowledges that John, Ricky, and her are a family. The two agree that they must find some way to make their family work.
| 39 | 16 | "Just Say Me" | Anson Williams | Brenda Hampton & Paul Perlove | January 25, 2010 | 3.23 |
Adrian gets her chance to befriend Amy by bringing her water. While the relationship starts as an act, Adrian starts to enjoy Amy's company, while Amy feels it is nice to have someone besides a boyfriend in her life. Meanwhile, Grace starts a trend when she decides to take care of herself and not worry about others. A "Just Say Me" campaign starts, and word of it spreads fast. Dr. Bink finds that Grace is the one who is responsible for the campaign, and calls her mom, only to make both of them clean up the school. With permission from Grace, Jack and Madison decide to get together. Later, Jimmy comes to invite Amy out for pizza and Amy decides to leave John with Ricky and Adrian instead of taking him with them.
| 40 | 17 | "The Second Time Around" | Keith Truesdell | Brenda Hampton & Elaine Arata | February 1, 2010 | 2.89 |
Amy goes on a date with Jimmy. Meanwhile, Ashley persuades George to visit Anne to rekindle their relationship, and Griffin sends his cousin Grant to get to know Ashley. Ben visits Grace and tells her that he wants to be friends, and as he leaves, they kiss. At the same time, Amy and Jimmy kiss. After George knocks on Anne's apartment door, Josh answers and explains Anne is with Mimsy and might come back home. While Ricky encourages Amy not to get caught up with Ben and Grace and tells her that he likes the attitude change he sees in her, Adrian's parents tell her they will get married, therefore causing her mom not to take the job offer in New York. When she returns home, Anne sees George outside with another woman, and tells Ashley that she doesn't think it would be a good time for her to be back.
| 41 | 18 | "Let's Try That Again" | Barry Watson | Brenda Hampton | February 8, 2010 | 2.99 |
When Jimmy doesn't call her, Madison and Lauren instill worries in Amy that she may have done something wrong. Adrian pushes Ricky to have their parents meet before her parents' wedding, and Ricky reluctantly agrees while insisting that no commitment is to come of it. A distraught Amy bumps into Ricky and seeks his advice. Ricky offers to privately help Amy fix her problem. Meanwhile, Dr. Bink promotes the mother daughter dance around Grant High School, and girls around the school ask their mothers to join them at the dance. Grace is reluctant to ask Kathleen to attend since she feels her mom is marrying Jeff too soon. Later, Jack and Ben discuss things and try to decide where they stand in Grace's life. An insecure Adrian meddles in Amy's love affairs with Jimmy due to an increasing fear that a single Amy and Ricky might just connect. At the same time, a confused Anne attempts to sort out her relationship with George and their family, encouraging that they see a therapist. Ashley quickly walks in and out of Ricky and Amy's much heated kissing. Later on, Ashley tells Anne that although it seems like their family is divided into two sides, she still loves her mother too.
| 42 | 19 | "The Rhythm of Life" | Keith Truesdell | Brenda Hampton & Jeffrey Rodgers | February 15, 2010 | 3.18 |
George and Ruben discover that Ricky and Amy kissed. While at the mother daughter dance, the mothers and daughters are caught up in gossip as Anne, Ashley, Grace, Amy, and Adrian discuss each other's personal relationships. Ben reveals to Henry and Alice the underlying reason for breaking things off with Amy which was fear that having sex with her may result in a second pregnancy. He also tells Leo that he wants to get back together with Amy. Meanwhile, at the mother daughter dance, rumors fly around that George and Anne will get married again. Later, Ben goes over to Amy's in hopes of a reconciliation only to find out about the kiss between Amy and Ricky. Adrian tries to console Ben. The two of them end up having sex, which they consider to be an act of revenge against Ricky and Amy. Ricky sends Adrian a text message saying that he loves her.
| 43 | 20 | "Mistakes Were Made" | Anson Williams | Brenda Hampton | February 22, 2010 | 3.03 |
Adrian confesses to Ricky what happened between her and Ben and is surprised to learn that Ricky only kissed Amy. After finding out about Ben and Adrian, Amy visits Jimmy to find out why he never called her and both apologize for their actions. Meanwhile, Madison and Lauren babysit John, Ashley's developing feelings for Grant escalate into a kiss, and George and Anne seek counseling from Dr. Fields for their relationship. Elsewhere, Ben is deeply convinced that he wants to be with Amy and regrets having anything to do with Adrian or Grace. Because Ben had sex with Adrian, Ricky gets angry with Ben's irresponsible action, destroying the friendship he has with Ricky, and causing Ricky to leave town in anger.
| 44 | 21 | "Choices" | Keith Truesdell | Brenda Hampton & Elaine Arata | March 1, 2010 | 3.14 |
Ricky attempts to track down his mother, and Ashley calls urging him to return home. Meanwhile, Adrian tells Cindy that she had sex with Ben; Cindy tells Ruben, who becomes upset. Amy decides that not having Ricky in her life is a good thing for her and John. Ben's father remains upset with Ben's decision to have sex with Adrian and feels he should apologize to Amy, Adrian, and Ricky for his irresponsible actions. Elsewhere, George notices Anne's new figure and wants to improve his own. No longer regretful, Adrian reassures Ben that they are both friends, while Ricky offers forgiveness to his mother as he struggles with his decision to abandon his son in order to escape his troubles.
| 45 | 22 | "Good Girls & Boys" | Anson Williams | Brenda Hampton | March 8, 2010 | 3.21 |
Leo offers advice as well as forgiveness to Ricky for leaving, and Ben seeks Ricky's forgiveness. Ricky's foster parents tell him they want to play a more prominent role in his life. Elsewhere, Jeff and Kathleen marry, but Grace isn't excited when they decide to have their honeymoon at home. After forgiving Ben, Ricky tells him that Amy will never forgive him for his indiscretion. Anne advises Amy to immediately confront her issues with Ricky and Amy realizes she would do just about anything for John. At school, Ricky confronts Adrian and ends their relationship. Later, Madison and Lauren are convinced Ricky is acting on his unresolved emotions for Amy. Meanwhile, Grace offers Ben her friendship and Ashley and Grant begin seeing each other regularly. Anne and George disagree on an appropriate time frame to remarry, and Ricky tells Amy that he is seeking the right to take John on weekends.
| 46 | 23 | "I Got You, Babe" | Keith Truesdell | Brenda Hampton & Jeffrey Rodgers | March 15, 2010 | 2.79 |
After her refusal, Ricky enlists George's help in getting Amy to reconsider his custody proposal. Adrian and Amy team up against Ricky by devising a plan for the custody hearing by having friends speak up on Amy's behalf for the mediation. Elsewhere, Anne, George, Margaret and Sanjay have a dinner discussion about their children not being able to come to an agreement. Ricky takes the case to a mediator after using Adrian and Amy's idea against them. When Amy decides that Ricky would be a good father to John, the mediator grants Ricky joint custody of John. Afterward, Amy and Ricky agree to work together to plan John's first birthday. Adrian realizes she may be pregnant as a result of her vengeful sexual encounter with Ben.
| 47 | 24 | "Ben There, Done That" | Anson Williams | Brenda Hampton & Elaine Arata | March 22, 2010 | 3.17 |
Without Ricky or anyone else knowing, Amy throws a little party for John and herself the night before his birthday. On John's first birthday, Anne tells Amy that she and George would not attend their grandson's birthday party because Mimzy had a stroke. Adrian tells Grace that she wants an abortion, and Grace urges to get an early pregnancy test to make sure she is actually pregnant. Elsewhere, Anne and George visit Mimzy who informs them that she married Eugene and George tells Anne he wants to marry the next day; Ricky and Amy decide to have a small party at Ricky's apartment for John, leaving Ashley alone for the night with Grant and Griffin; and Cindy and Ruben, Adrian's parents, have a small wedding of their own. When Amy and Ricky arrive at the butcher shop, Ben tells Amy that he would always be there for her. Betty and Leo happily marry each other; at the same time, Anne tells George she isn't ready for a wedding, and Adrian wants to tell Ben that she could be pregnant, but a decision is not made.

== Development ==
=== Writing ===
Though it came as a surprise, writers of Secret Life were faced with a challenge when writing began for the second season. In January 2009, Molly Ringwald announced that she was expecting twins of her own. She told People Magazine that Brenda Hampton was working on writing her character's pregnancy into the storyline of the show.

Kenny Baumann, the actor who plays Ben Boykewich, confirmed that someone would die in the second season of Secret Life. The character would be a "significant male character" and the death would be a terrible tragedy. It was later revealed that John Schneider, who portrayed the role as Grace's father, Marshall, left the show due to multiple shows and projects he has. Marshall was written out of the series in "The Big One".

=== New and returning characters ===
Actor Brando Eaton was cast as Ashley's new gay sidekick, Griffin, who has a recurring role in the season. Actress Rumer Willis, appeared in Secret Life as Heather, a pregnant girl in the episode "Knocked Up Who's There?". She interacted with Ben in a way that got Amy jealous. Actor Austin Stowell was cast as Lauren's new boyfriend, Jesse, who has a recurring role in the season. Their relationship sparks the discussion of interracial dating, as Jesse believes that Lauren is not interested in having sex with him because of his race.

== Reception ==
On Monday, June 22, 2009, Secret Life opened its second season with the largest audience so far, posting a series high in Total Viewers with 4.68 million viewers, and second-best numbers ever in Adults 18–34 with 1.4 million viewers, behind season one's mid-season finale, Adults 18–49 with 2.1 million viewers and Viewers 11–34 with 2.9 million viewers. In June 2009, Secret Life ranked as cable's No. 1 scripted telecast in Females 11–34, and the No. 1 scripted series telecast in Viewers 11–34 and Female Teens. Additionally, Secret Life stood as ad-supported cable's No. 1 telecast this month in Female Teens. Impressively, the season debut became cable's No. 1 scripted series premiere of the 2008/2009 season to date in Women 18–34, Women 18–49, and Viewers 11–34, and the No. 1 scripted original premiere of Summer 2009 so far in Adults 18–34.

Secret Life's second season debut now stands as cable's No. 1 scripted original series/season premiere this summer in Adults ages 18–34 and across core female 18–34, 18–49 and 11–34 demos, ahead of such high-profile series as USA's Royal Pains and Burn Notice and TNT's The Closer.

Some critics praised the new developments of the show, saying they could be "interesting material to build on." Jean Bentley of Entertainment Weekly says that with the whole "teen going through a pregnancy" plot being played out and the "frustrated young mother" thing is going on, we have room to explore some other topics. She remained hopeful that the writers won't just turn these new problems into issues of the week, instead allowing time for the characters to grieve Marshall's death, deal with Anne's accidental pregnancy, and explore the more emotionally complex aspects of teenage sex.

With more than 4.55 million people watching the season two mid-season premiere, the episode became ABC Family's most-watched telecast ever in key 12–34 and teen demos. The episode stands as the series' 2nd-most-watched episode in viewers and is TV's No. 1 telecast of the season in female teens, cable's No. 1 telecast in females 12-34 and cable's No. 1 scripted telecast in viewers 12–34. The season two mid-season premiere remains cable's No. 1 scripted premiere of the 2009/10 season. It improved nearly one million total viewers over its season two mid-season finale, and was No. 1 in all target demos for the hour.
