= The Secret Life of the American Teenager season 1 =

The Secret Life of the American Teenager
- Season 1
- Season 1 Volume 1 DVD Cover
- No. of episodes: 23

Release
- Original network: ABC Family
- Original release: July 1, 2008 – March 23, 2009

Season chronology
- Next → Season 2

The first season of The Secret Life of the American Teenager, an American television series created by Brenda Hampton, debuted on the ABC Family television network on July 1, 2008. The first season comprises 23 episodes, the first eleven of which ended on September 9, 2008. Despite marketing issues, the remaining twelve ended up as part of the first season, which concluded its initial airing on March 23, 2009. Season one regular cast members include Shailene Woodley, Molly Ringwald, Daren Kagasoff, Kenny Baumann, Francia Raisa, Megan Park, India Eisley, Greg Finley II, Jorge Pallo, Mark Derwin, and Luke Zimmerman.

Kyle XY was ABC Family's highest rated original series from June 2006 - July 2016, but lost its reign when the series premiere of The Secret Life of the American Teenager brought in 2.8 million viewers. The season finale brought in 4.50 million viewers, 2.4 million of whom were females. The show was the number one scripted telecast on March 23, 2009 in viewers 12-34 and the number one telecast that night in viewers.

The season focuses on the relationships between families and friends dealing with the unexpected teen pregnancy of character Amy Juergens, portrayed by Shailene Woodley. Probably the last girl anyone would expect to suffer such a scandalous event, Amy's world begins to expand as she discovers that virtually every student at her high school deals with some secret or unexpected problems, from the religious good-girl Grace to the tough-kid Ricky and to clingy loving Ben.

== Main cast ==
- Shailene Woodley as Amy Juergens
- Kenny Baumann as Ben Boykewich
- Mark Derwin as George Juergens
- India Eisley as Ashley Juergens
- Greg Finley as Jack Pappas
- Daren Kagasoff as Ricky Underwood
- Jorge-Luis Pallo as Marc Molina
- Megan Park as Grace Bowman
- Francia Raisa as Adrian Lee
- Molly Ringwald as Anne Juergens

== Episodes ==
No. overall	No. in season	Title	Directed by	Written by	Original release date	U.S. viewers (millions)
1	1	"Falling In Love"	Ron Underwood	Brenda Hampton	July 1, 2008	2.82
After losing her virginity to sixteen-year-old Ricky Underwood at band camp, 15-year-old Amy Juergens discovers that she is pregnant. Scared to tell her parents and unsure what to do, she turns to her two best friends, Lauren and Madison, for help. To confirm the pregnancy they run out and buy her three different pregnancy tests, all of which turn up positive. They encourage her to go to her doctor but not to tell until she is absolutely certain. Meanwhile, in a quest to lose his virginity, Ben Boykewich, sees Amy across the crowded hallway and is encouraged by his best friends, Henry and Alice, to ask her out. He joins the band to meet her and one day asks her to the homecoming dance after the school's big football game. There he becomes completely enamored by her, as does she, however Amy struggles with having to tell him that she's pregnant. Lauren and Madison attempt to convince Amy to have sex with Ben and tell him the baby is his, but she refuses. Ricky comes up to Amy telling her she shouldn't be with Ben. Meanwhile, Jack Pappas, longtime boyfriend to the adherently Christian Grace Bowman, struggles with the idea of having to wait at least ten more years to have sex with Grace. Under pressure he secretly spends the night with Adrian Lee, the school majorette and Ricky's girlfriend. At the dance he begs her not to tell anyone about their night spent together. They kiss and are caught by Tom Bowman, Grace's brother, who alerts Grace (as well as the entire school) to Jack's infidelity.
2	2	"You Are My Everything"	Keith Truesdell	Brenda Hampton	July 8, 2008	2.81
Despite Madison and Lauren's insistence that Amy tell her parents about her pregnancy, Amy insists on convincing herself that Ricky and her pregnancy never happened and tries to go about her life as normal. As they discuss Amy's situation, they are overheard by Henry and Alice in the hallway and the rumor spreads throughout the school that Ricky and Amy had sex. Meanwhile, Ricky attempts to pursue Amy, despite her insistence that she is seeing someone else and is not interested. Despite the new rumor about Ricky and Amy and despite Adrian's kiss with Jack, Adrian and Ricky continue to see each other, however their relationship is wrought with constant bickering. Ben continues to be completely enamored by Amy, even going to far as admitting to Henry and Alice that he can see himself marrying her. They warn him about the rumor they overheard and he begins to fear that he is in competition with Ricky. He tells Amy he heard the rumors but that they mean nothing to him, telling Amy he loves her. During this time, Jack is also pleading with Grace for forgiveness but she refuses to speak to him. At school, she calls her mother and asks to take her home. Her mother encourages her not to blame herself (or Jack and Adrian) and to just let things go. When Jack comes by Grace's house her father shoos him off the porch, however, hearing that Jack came to see her makes her begin to want Jack back again, despite her father's warnings to stay away from him from now on. She tells Jack the next day at school that she is willing to forgive Jack and go back out with him as long as she gets her parents' permission and as long as he doesn't try to pressure her into having sex until she's ready and Jack agrees.
3	3	"I Feel Sick"	Ron Underwood	Brenda Hampton	July 15, 2008	2.48
Ben continues to fall hard for Amy, and the two share their first kiss. Elsewhere, Amy tells her sister about her pregnancy before she tells her parents, Grace uses Ricky as a cover to sneak around with Jack, and a jealous Adrian feels like Ricky is just using her for sex.
4	4	"Caught"	Keith Truesdell	Brenda Hampton	July 22, 2008	3.09
Amy can't stand Ben's clingy behavior, especially in the face of her parents' increasingly strained relations with one another. Elsewhere, Ricky continues to play a part in Grace and Jack's plot to see each other, but as things backfire, Jack seeks comfort from Adrian.
5	5	"What Have You Done to Me?"	Ron Underwood	Brenda Hampton	July 29, 2008	3.58
Ben and Amy are at odds about what to do: he's thinking marriage and is willing to act as the baby’s father, while she's thinking about having an abortion. Elsewhere, Ashley pleads with her dad not to leave home and Grace learns that Jack did more than kiss Adrian.
6	6	"Love for Sale"	Keith Truesdell	Brenda Hampton	August 5, 2008	4.10
After much delay, Amy tells her mother that she's pregnant. Meanwhile, on a day Amy doesn't show up at school, rumors circulate that she took off in order to "take care" of her problem.
7	7	"Absent"	Anson Williams	Brenda Hampton & Jeffery Rodgers	August 12, 2008	3.70
Amy weighs her options regarding her residency situation. Meanwhile, Ricky wrestles with taking responsibility for his actions.
8	8	"Your Cheatin' Heart"	Keith Truesdell	Brenda Hampton & Elaine Arata	August 19, 2008	3.91
Amy's grandmother, "Mimsy" (Alice Hirson), visits the family and offers to help out with Amy's situation. Later on they, find out that she has Alzheimer's. Elsewhere, Adrian makes sure her budding friendship with Grace is on display for all to see.
9	9	"Slice of Life"	Jason Priestley	Brenda Hampton, Jeff Olsen, & Chris Olsen	August 26, 2008	3.65
Amy and Ashley spend some time bonding with their dad, while Adrian locates her estranged father. Elsewhere, Tom has a little party for himself, complete with pizza and a prostitute (Jennifer Coolidge) he calls, and Jason and Madison see Lauren kissing Ricky. Amy finds out that her dad, George, is seeing Adrian's mom. Meanwhile, Adrian finds her dad as she waits out by his house. Near the end, Anne find out that George was sleeping with Adrian's mom and is now sleeping in the furniture store. Anne and Ashley now think that George is broke and they are now in poverty.
10	10	"Back to School Special"	Keith Truesdell	Caroline Kepnes	September 2, 2008	3.90
Amy finally makes a decision regarding where she will go to school. Elsewhere, Adrian's mom suggests that Adrian develop a relationship with her dad; and Henry and Alice take a new step in their relationship. When Amy returns to school the next day, Ben, Grace, Jack, Henry, Alice, Lauren, Madison, Jason, and Ricky supports Amy's decision to come back to school.
11	11	"Just Say No"	Jason Priestley	Teleplay by : Jeff Olson & Caroline Kepnes; Story by : Elaine Arata & Brenda Hampton	September 9, 2008	4.54
Adrian disappears from school, which sparks a salacious rumor and a call to the police from her dad. Meanwhile, Grace receives multiple warnings about Ricky, and Amy and Ben mull the next move in their relationship.
12	12	"The Secret Wedding of the American Teenager"	Lindsley Parsons III	Brenda Hampton	January 5, 2009	4.37
After hearing that she will need to get a job and accept responsibility if she was to keep her baby, Amy plans to marry Ben with fake IDs. Ricky finds out and goes to a boy at school to get one for himself--as do Henry, Alice, Ashley, Adrian, Grace, Lauren, Madison, Jason, and Jack. George moves into the Juergens' garage.
13	13	"Baked Nevada"	Anson Williams	Brenda Hampton	January 12, 2009	3.10
Party's over when George and Leo catch Amy and Ben at their wedding reception. Back at the chapel, Tom wants to marry Tammy but Grace stops him. Elsewhere, Ricky starts visiting Adrian again and Amy and Ben learn that their marriage is not legally valid. Jack steps up and falsely confesses to creating the fake IDs, and is forced to do community service. Anne talks with Amy and Ben and gives them advice on what they should do with the baby, when Amy feels her baby kick for the first time.
14	14	"The Father and the Son"	Keith Truesdell	Brenda Hampton	January 19, 2009	3.91
Ashley enlists the help of Reverend Stone (Tom Virtue) to ensure that her parents will stay together. Ricky's estranged father, Bob (MADtv's Bryan Callen), returns to town on parole in search of his son. He pays a visit to Amy and her family and later threatens Ricky with the possibility of giving the baby up for adoption. Amy reveals to her parents that Ricky has been sexually abused by his father and Anne suggests that they should seriously consider what's best for the baby-–adoption. Amy seriously considers this option and discusses it with Ben and Ricky, who both want her to keep the baby, but for very different reasons. Anne seeks out the advice of Reverend Stone to see if he knows any nice families who are looking to adopt.
15	15	"That's Enough of That"	Anson Williams	Brenda Hampton & Jeffrey Rodgers	January 26, 2009	3.10
Ricky tells Adrian about his abusive father and reveals that as long as his father is around, he won't see Grace. Come time to find out the sex of the baby, Ben is disappointed when Amy tells him she doesn't want him to come with her to her appointment. Meanwhile, Bob (Bryan Callen) again approaches Ricky with the idea of giving up the baby for adoption, and Jack's community service starts out very unexpectedly. Anne begins to fully accept the consequences of Amy being pregnant and Ben records a video of Amy, revealing that she is having a boy. Ricky's father goes back to jail for possession of illegal drugs.
16	16	"Chocolate Cake"	Keith Truesdell	Brenda Hampton & Jeffrey Rodgers	February 2, 2009	3.05
Ben is distraught over the fact that Ricky and Amy were planning to meet to talk about the baby without him. Frustrated, he decides to join them in their decision. Meanwhile, Anne goes to meet Reverend Stone and finds out about Ashley's plan to stop her parents' divorce. Jack finds out Shawna isn't interested in him and goes to see Grace to tell her that Ricky and Adrian are still having sex and Adrian's father catches her in a compromising position with her stepbrother, Max. Meanwhile, George finds out his two gay co-workers are interested in adopting Amy's baby and Ashley admits to Anne that she has been upset and promises not to act out anymore. Later, Ricky agrees to let Amy give the baby up for adoption.
17	17	"Unforgiven"	Jason Priestley	Brenda Hampton & Elaine Arata	February 9, 2009	3.50
Ben tells Amy that he needs some space and starts to doubt about his relationship with Amy who becomes aggravated. Jack and Shawna agree to see each other. Adrian and Grace argue over Ricky, but become closer to each other as a result. Elsewhere, Grace's parents apologize to each other and George interviews people who are interested in adopting Amy's illegitimate baby. Meanwhile, Ricky and Amy get into a heated discussion about her breakup with Ben and putting the baby up for adoption. Making her hurt and upset by his objections, Ricky then tries to console her. George's gay co-workers come by and talk to George and Anne about them wanting to adopt Amy's baby, and Amy agrees. Ricky tells Jack that he is through with both of Adrian and Grace for good and wants to be with Amy.
18	18	"Making Up Is Hard to Do"	Keith Truesdell	Brenda Hampton, Chris Olsen, & Jeff Olsen	February 16, 2009	3.51
Ricky sees Dr. Fields and tells him that he has his mindset on Amy. He also tells him that he's going to try and sabotage the adoption. Ashley skips school and runs into a schoolmate, Thomas. Then, Ashley tries to talk Ben into pursuing Amy. Elsewhere, Max comes over to Adrian's condo and they go on their first date. Duncan tells Jack that if he hurts Shawna, he will pay the consequences. Later on, Amy and Ricky meet with Donovan and Leon. After the interview, Donovan and Leon decide that they want to try to adopt their foster kids instead.
19	19	"Money for Nothing, Chicks for Free"	Jason Priestley	Brenda Hampton & Caroline Kepnes	February 23, 2009	3.27
Anne receives a potential job offer, Adrian tries to change her style by "becoming a virgin again", and Jack raises money for underprivileged children. Elsewhere, Amy and Ben get back together, Donovan and Leon tell the Juergens they don't want to adopt Amy's baby, and Amy decides not to go through with the adoption. Ashley sneaks around with Thomas and gets to know him better. Because of Amy's decision, Anne and Ben pressure her into getting a job.
20	20	"Maybe Baby"	Keith Truesdell	Brenda Hampton	March 2, 2009	3.32
Ben and Ricky both get a job together at Ben's dad's sausage shop. Meanwhile, George gets a loan on a foreclosed house, and Amy begins to worry about her diet. Ashley is clearly upset over Amy wanting to get rid of the baby and expresses her anger when she finds the tape that Amy and Ben made for the baby. Amy fights with Ashley and George, admitting she really does care about her son and Ashley tells Amy that she is a smart girl and that she can handle the baby. However, both envious Grace and Adrian want to make sure she does NOT keep the baby because it gives her a tie to Ricky. Amy's friends mysteriously all show up at her house and Grace tells Amy she found her a job at the Church where she could get daycare and insurance. With the support of her friends, her father, and sister, Amy changes her mind about keeping the baby. She asks her mother if she can keep the baby and her mother agrees.
21	21	"Whoomp! (There It Is)"	Jason Priestley	Brenda Hampton	March 9, 2009	3.35
A baby shower is planned for Amy. In the meantime, Grace and Jack reconnect and Ricky practices how to change a diaper. George tells Anne and Ashley that he is moving out, however, on her way to her baby shower, Amy goes into labor and George gets a call so he can meet Amy, Anne, and Ashley at the hospital. Ben suggests to Amy to call Ricky and tell him that she is in labor.
22	22	"One Night at Band Camp"	John Schneider	Brenda Hampton & Jeffrey Rodgers	March 16, 2009	3.11
As Amy goes into labor, she becomes cranky and flashes back to the first time she met Ricky at band camp and how he charmed her. Tom tries to get Grace and Jack back together and Grace asks her parents for their permission. Amy realizes the sex between her and Ricky wasn't entirely his fault and feels bad for blaming it all on him. Elsewhere, Ricky tells Ashley that he wants to care for the baby and help Amy by being a good friend and Adrian realizes she still cares for Ricky.
23	23	"And Unto Us, A Child Is Born"	Keith Truesdell	Brenda Hampton	March 23, 2009	4.49
Friends and family gather at the hospital to give their support to the Juergens family, who eagerly await the arrival of Amy's baby. At the same time, Ben and Ricky agree to forge a friendship as they discuss their future relationship. When Adrian arrives at the hospital to support Ricky, Grace tells Ricky that she's getting back together with Jack. Several hours later, Amy's baby is finally born, Amy's classmates all get to see the baby, and Amy and Ashley decide to name him John. Upon returning home, however, Amy struggles with adjusting to being a new mother. Later, Ricky visits his newborn son and realizes he might like fatherhood, while Ashley and George surprise Anne by moving out of the family home.

== Reception ==
The series received a mixed reception when it began broadcasting. Many mainstream critics praised the messages presented in the series, although it was also criticized for its direction and writing. New York Post praised the series for having a set of characters that are "...real and come from families of all stripes — from intact to single-parent households to one boy in foster care..." The pilot episode broke the record for highest rated debut for ABC Family, beating Kyle XY, with 2.82 million viewers. The season one finale brought in 4.50 million viewers, beating the night's 90210 which had almost half its usual number of viewers.
