= The Secret Life of the American Teenager season 3 =

Third season of The Secret Life of the American Teenager

The Secret Life of the American Teenager
- Season 3
- Season 3 promotional poster
- No. of episodes: 26

Release
- Original network: ABC Family
- Original release: June 7, 2010 – June 6, 2011

Season chronology
- ← Previous; Season 2 Next → Season 4

The third season of The Secret Life of the American Teenager, an American television series created by Brenda Hampton, debuted on the ABC Family television network on Monday, June 7, 2010 at 8:00 PM. After its second season's mid-season premiere was successful, ABC Family announced on January 12, 2010, that the show would be renewed for a third season, consisting of 26 episodes, the most episodes in a season to date. Season 3 began with 14 episodes broadcast before going on a hiatus until March 2011.

== Main cast ==
- Shailene Woodley as Amy Juergens
- Kenny Baumann as Ben Boykewich
- Mark Derwin as George Juergens
- India Eisley as Ashley Juergens
- Greg Finley as Jack Pappas
- Daren Kagasoff as Ricky Underwood
- Megan Park as Grace Bowman
- Francia Raisa as Adrian Lee
- Steven R. Schirripa as Leo Boykewich
- Molly Ringwald as Anne Juergens

== Episodes ==
No. overall	No. in season	Title	Directed by	Written by	Original release date	U.S. viewers (millions)
48	1	"Do Over"	Keith Truesdell	Brenda Hampton	June 7, 2010	3.18
Adrian puts to rest rumors of her pregnancy by informing Ben she is menstruating; Amy is confused about Ben's mixed signals when he begins avoiding her. After school, Grace visits Ben wanting to celebrate receiving her drivers license but he tells her that he has to go to work. Instead, he calls out and visits Adrian to confront her about his disbelief of her false alarm. Meanwhile, Ricky advises Ashley to not have a sex life, George gets his infected hair plugs removed and Jack tells Madison that he loves her; Ricky also questions Ben's motive to tell Amy that he loves her, only to then avoid her. Jack's parents tell him that they are moving to Phoenix, Arizona. They ask him to find a friend to stay with for his senior year prompting him to ask Madison whose parents both object to the request. Ben visits Amy and they rekindle their relationship. Upon being caught, Ashley admits to her going on the pill while slipping the news to her parents that Amy is on the pill as well.
49	2	"Accentuate the Positive"	Gail Bradley	Jeffrey Rodgers	June 14, 2010	2.85
Adrian has morning sickness and starts to vomit. When Ashley tries to get a ride from her, she stays with Adrian to comfort her. Ben tells Grace that because of his history with Amy, he can no longer date her, but assures her they will stay friends, leaving Grace upset. Meanwhile, Jack asks Ricky and Grace's family to stay with them for his senior year, but they both deny his request. Griffin tells Grant that it would only hurt his and Ashley's relationship if he transfers to Ulysses High School in the fall. Elsewhere, Amy gets invited to a musical program in New York for the summer that would presumably help her get into Juilliard, but decides not to go because of John; Adrian tells Ashley that she plans to have an abortion; and Ricky forces Ben to face the truth about Adrian's pregnancy. Jack tells Grace that no one is to decide or judge Adrian's actions and Ben reveals his secret to his father.
50	3	"Get Out of Town"	Keith Truesdell	Brenda Hampton	June 21, 2010	2.77
After coming clean to his father, Ben remains stressed about his urgent situation with Adrian as he and Leo disagree on how to go about it. Meanwhile Amy gets much needed support for her chance to attend the music program and Adrian's parents suspect that something is going on with her. At school, Ben insists on talking to Adrian about where they stand while Adrian refuses his efforts and continues to ignore Grace; Amy also receives news that she is to leave for New York the following day. Later, Ricky promises to move into Amy's room to take care of John while she is away and George and Anne decide to rekindle their intimate relationship. Elsewhere, Jeff urges Grace to focus on herself and her future rather than Adrian's situation but Grace argues that she wants to be there for her friend inferring that perhaps she would rather focus on others problems rather than her own. Ben becomes upset when Leo explains that he passed the news of Adrian's pregnancy onto Ruben over dinner and Cindy comes home to the same shocking news as she learns of her daughter's secret.
51	4	"Goodbye, Amy Juergens"	Anson Williams	Elaine Arata	June 28, 2010	3.00
Ben visits Ricky, looking for advice on his current situation with Adrian, while Ricky's new interest, Zoe, overhears the two talking. Cindy confronts Adrian about what she has learned the night before and the two have a discussion about Adrian's options. While anticipating Amy's departure for New York, George raises some concerns about Ricky moving in by instructing Ashley not to overstep her boundaries. Tom continues to search for a job, Madison reveals Adrian's secret to Lauren, and Jack asks the coach if he can move in with him for his senior year. Zoe confronts Adrian about her secret and threatens to reveal the news to the school, but Grace steps in to defend her friend. At the airport, Ben prolongs saying goodbye to Amy and at the same time, Ruben and Cindy disagree on whether or not it is allowable for Adrian to have an abortion. After becoming jealous about him and Zoe, Ashley tries to make Ricky jealous by pretending to date Grant. Later, Ruben tells Adrian that the difference of opinions over abortion may hurt their future as a family.
52	5	"Which Way Did She Go?"	Keith Truesdell	Brenda Hampton	July 5, 2010	2.99
Rumors circulate about the high school that Amy's early semester departure is due to a second pregnancy leaving Madison, Lauren, Ashley and Ricky to combat the rumors. Adrian makes one final confirmation to Ben on the status of her decision while Grace continues to find ways to convince Adrian not to terminate her pregnancy. Tom continues his search for work to support Adrian, and Ben continues to seek advice from Ricky about the final decision. Jack secretly moves into the Bowman guest house with Tom, and Ricky and Anne exchange insight on Amy's musical future. Adrian overhears her parents arguing about her decision and becomes overwhelmed, deciding to run away to Ben's house for the night. Later Ashley and Ricky kiss despite Ricky telling Ashley that it is a bad idea. Ruben and Cindy discover Adrian has fled, and Madison believes Jack is cheating. The Next day, Amy meets Bristol Palin at her music program in New York, where she discovers the music program is for teen mothers.
53	6	"She Went That Away"	Lindsley Parsons III	Paul Perlove	July 12, 2010	3.09
Adrian meets Ricky's foster mom at the clinic and admits to her that she does not want to be a teenage mother but after talking, she has a change of heart and tells Ben that she will not go through with the abortion. When Ricky gets a call from Amy, he hangs up and Ashley receives a text message from Adrian, saying that she will have the baby. Ashley, therefore, tells Anne and George, and also attempts to convince her parents to withhold the information from Amy until after Ben tells her. When Ben and Adrian visit Grace to tell her the news, Tom overhears the conversation and relays it to Jack. Ben and Jack both tell Madison about Adrian's decision, and she attempts to tell Ben to tell Amy before anyone else does.
54	7	"New York, New York"	Keith Truesdell	Brenda Hampton	July 19, 2010	3.04
Ashley tells Ricky that they shouldn't be together; George and Anne overhear the conversation and suggest that he should allow the family to have some privacy for a few days. While in his apartment, Ricky gets an unexpected visit from his real mother, who explains that she has violated her parole, and therefore is expected to turn herself in. Ben regrets his father's wishes to call Amy and inform her about Adrian's pregnancy when Adrian announces to the school that she will be keeping his baby. Ben's father tells him that he will take Ben to New York so Amy can be up to date. Meanwhile, Kathleen finds out that Jack is living in the guest house and tells Jack that he can stay, Ricky gives an emotional goodbye to his mother, and Ashley admits to being in love with Ricky. When Ben informs Amy about Adrian's pregnancy, she becomes upset.
55	8	"The Sounds of Silence"	Anson Williams	Jeffrey Rodgers	July 26, 2010	2.56
Since Ben revealed his and Adrian's predicament, Amy only talks to John. Therefore, Ben becomes aggravated and moody. Leo tells Ricky that he and Bunny both would like to offer his mother a job. He suggests that Ricky ask Ruben a favor, to see if he can help with the process at all. Meanwhile, George plans a romantic date for Anne, but after she leaves to care for a sick Mimsy, George and Ashley spend dinner talking about her feelings for Ricky. At the same time, Ben insists upon going out with Grace, and Ricky asks Ruben if his mother could appeal her case. Amy reaches out to Adrian, asking if her offer of friendship still stands. Ashley talks to Ricky about Amy, when he tells her that Amy's the only person he cares about, besides John, leaving her heartbroken.
56	9	"Chicken Little"	Keith Truesdell	Brenda Hampton	August 2, 2010	2.71
Ashley Wishing Grant would return her calls, Ashley talks to Griffin about her complicated relationship with Ricky. Instead of repairing Grant's relationship with Ashley, he sets Grant up with Grace, who is looking for a new date. With this plan in motion, Grace also plans to set Griffin up herself. Griffin realizes the boy, named Peter, he was set up with was in denial about his sexuality, and encourages him to talk to his parents. Meanwhile, Ricky and Ben have an argument over who really deserves to be with Adrian, and both Ben and Adrian's parents pressure them into marrying each other. Ashley fixes dinner for her and Ricky but Ricky bails on her to talk to Adrian. Ricky and Adrian kiss and Ashley witnesses the whole thing, leaving her heartbroken. Amy calls Ashley and tells her she is giving up the french horn and Ashley informs her about Ricky. Ricky and Adrian agree to just be friends. Ben calls Adrian and they both agree they don't want to get married. Adrian later admits to her baby that she is still in love with Ricky.
57	10	"My Girlfriend's Back"	Anson Williams	Elaine Arata	August 9, 2010	2.65
After the last day of school, Ben worries about Amy not returning his calls, thinking it is a sign of a dwindling relationship. Amy informs Ricky of plans to continue to play the French Horn for enjoyment, rather than pursuing a career in it; she also tells him that she will stay for an extended amount of time in New York City. Ricky then suggests that he visits her. Meanwhile, Ben receives a call from Amy, who tells him that they would talk when she returns home and Leo suggests that Ben hold a party to celebrate the end of school. While there, Ashley abruptly announces Ricky's plans to visit Amy and Jack informs Madison that he plans to visit his parents in Phoenix; while in New York, Amy and Ricky discuss the possibility of becoming a couple. Elsewhere, both Grace and Grant's and Griffin and Peter's relationships continue to evolve.
58	11	"Lady Liberty"	Keith Truesdell	Brenda Hampton	August 16, 2010	2.83
After an altercation with Ricky, Ben is fired. Meanwhile, Lauren and Madison face the consequences of lying to their parents about where they slept after Ben's party and Anne and George announce to Ashley that they will marry after Amy returns. When Adrian talks to Amy, she realizes that she is torn between Ben and Ricky even further; she takes this realization to Ben, who in turn realizes that he should follow Leo's advice of marrying Adrian. Instead of doing this for the right reasons, he decides that doing this would get back at Amy, thus causing Leo to convince Ben that it is a bad idea. Amy's friends take her to a New York nightclub for her birthday, which her family, friends, and Ricky forget; after finding out about Amy's night out, Ricky sleeps with a new girl. Adrian and Ben decide to fake an engagement to hurt Ricky and Amy, but Adrian also warns Ben that if they do it, Ruben may make them go through with the engagement and marriage.
59	12	"Sweet and Sour"	Anson Williams	Paul Perlove	August 23, 2010	2.68
While friends and family of Amy's realize they have forgotten her birthday the previous day, Betty gives Ben an old ring of hers in order for Ben to give it to Adrian. Meanwhile, Jack reveals to Madison's father that they have been having foreplay and Grace's mom tells Grace to avoid having sex; Leo attends therapy and Amy arrives home early. After Ben gives the ring to Adrian, she returns it. Ben asks to be a part of the pregnancy, like he was with Amy's, after he realizes that he should do the right thing and not fake an engagement. Note: Anne mentions how everyone forgot her sixteenth birthday and it was horrible, possibly referencing the film Sixteen Candles which Molly Ringwald starred in.
60	13	"Up All Night"	Anson Williams	Brenda Hampton	August 30, 2010	2.91
Amy questions whether Ricky is ready for an exclusive relationship. Madison and Lauren are upset about not being able to see Jack and Jesse, while Jack and Jesse talk about how badly Jack wants to keep Grant away from Grace. Meanwhile, Ben continues to support Adrian by spending the night at her house, and Henry and Alice sleep at his house. Elsewhere, Anne is surprised to find that Amy left the music program early and Ricky and Amy agree to go on a date.
61	14	"Rules of Engagement"	Keith Truesdell	Brenda Hampton	September 6, 2010	3.03
Ashley tries to persuade Ricky to have sex with her and Amy takes a stance against her actions. Anne questions whether George actually wants to get married, contrary to his original claims, and suggests that they finally split up without hurting their children. Elsewhere, Adrian believes that Ricky is just using Amy for sex and Grace wonders if Adrian is considering marriage. Meanwhile, Amy goes out with Ricky; and Grace and Grant prepare for camp.
62	15	"Who Do You Trust"	Keith Truesdell	Brenda Hampton	March 28, 2011	3.33
After summer vacation is over, everyone is back for the first day of school. Adrian and Ben are a couple and Amy and Ricky are dating and Ricky has been faithful to Amy during the summer. Amy considers having sex with Ricky, but she demands for him to be tested for STDs before they do and Ricky decides to ask the girls that he has slept with if they have any STDs to find out what his chances are before he does. Ashley discusses her desire to be home schooled with the new guidance counselor Katelyn O'Malley. Jack and Madison end up breaking up as Madison wants to date some guy that she had worked with at the food court over the summer and Jesse and Lauren end up breaking up because Jesse will be going away to college next year. George and Anne are finally separated and George firmly talks to Amy to get her to change her mind about her having sex with Ricky, but Amy reminds that she has already had sex with Ricky once before. Ricky gets tested for STDs at the clinic and he is scared of what he might have, but his foster mother Margaret who runs into him there tells him that she is there for him no matter what happens. Tom is the Vice President of Human Resources at a company owned by Milton and his former girlfriend Tammy is working for him. Grant and Grace are ready to have sex after abstaining from it all summer, but Grace balks when Grant suggests that she gets tested for STDs first and she is concerned to find out that Jack had a treatable STD at one point. Ben and Adrian's baby is revealed to be a girl. Ricky has a surprising visit from his biological mother Nora who has been let out of prison and she says that her staying with him is only temporary.
63	16	"Mirrors"	Anson Williams	Jeffrey Rodgers	April 4, 2011	2.50
After Ricky's biological mother Nora is back in town and she will be sticking around, Ricky attempts to have his custody agreement over John with Amy declare that she cannot live with him because she is an ex-con and his concern about letting her get involved into his life while Amy meets Nora for the first time. George blames Anne for making him be the bad cop in their children's lives now that she wants to be the good cop. Lauren is broken hearted from her break up with Jesse. Madison continues to be interested in Stanley, her former boss, who is in his mid-twenties and her father convinces Jack to do his best to get back together with her to keep her from dating Stanley. Ricky and Amy discuss Nora getting to meet John, but Ricky explains to Amy that he does not want Nora to meet John until he is sure that she can stay sober from alcohol and drugs. Grace feels dirty from finding out that she could have gotten an STD from when she had sex with Jack and she gets into a fight with Jack about it. Ashley's home schooling is not going very well as she is just sitting around at home doing nothing until Katelyn, the guidance counselor, has some rules set down for her with her home schooling. Ben insists that Adrian move in with him, but she says no.George is worried about home schooling not being right for Ashley and her lack of friends and Griffin suggests to him to get her a study buddy to make her want to go back to school. Grant lets Grace know that he loves her. Morgan, Madison's father, will not let Madison date Stanley because of their age difference when Madison has her parents meet him. Ricky pays his foster parents Shekar and Margaret a visit to let them know that his tests for STDs came back negative and see if they will let Nora live with them. Ben wants to marry Adrian before their baby arrives since Adrian will not live with him unless they are married and Leo wants him to consider waiting to get married until he does not have to ask him if he can marry someone.
64	17	"Guess Who's Not Coming to Dinner"	Gail Bradley	Brenda Hampton	April 11, 2011	2.29
Ricky's foster parents Shekar and Margaret agree to allow his biological mother Nora to live with them at their house and Bunny has given Nora a job at the butcher shop. Before Margaret has Nora come to live with them, she lays down the ground rules for their house to Nora especially about her having no men or women in her bedroom. Nora confesses to Ricky that she is dating another woman which dumbfounds Ricky to find out that she is a lesbian. Meanwhile Ashley continues to struggle with her home schooling and she is determined to make home schooling work out for her and George does his best to explain to Amy to not have sex again with Ricky and figure out how to be a good father to both Amy and Ashley. Jack and Tom discuss if either Grant or Jack would be better for Grace and Adrian explain their feelings for Grant and Ben to each other. Adrian and Ben figure out their real feelings for each other and if they want to get married or not. Leo and Ruben get together to discuss the possibility of Ben asking Adrian to marry him, but Cindy is hesitant about Adrian and Ben getting married. Ricky is still reluctant to let Nora meet John and lies about having the flu to get out of taking John to see Nora, but Amy talks him into letting Nora see John. Cindy and Ruben let Ben have their permission to propose to Adrian. Amy and Ricky let Nora see John for the first time and Ricky tells Nora that he wants to meet her girlfriend. Ben plans a romantic evening out with Adrian at a restaurant that he rents out for just them and he asks Adrian to marry him. Adrian says yes and they kiss and tell each other that they love each other.
65	18	"Another Proposal"	Anson Williams	Elaine Arata	April 18, 2011	2.35
Adrian and Ben are planning to get married and Amy and Ricky are under a lot of pressure because of it. Amy and Ashley both are away at their mother's condo with John to visit Anne and Robbie for the weekend. Amy has George and Nora check up on Ricky to make sure that Ricky is not cheating on her while she is away and George decides that Nora is attractive when he ends up meeting Nora while he is there. Adrian drives everyone crazy including Ben with her plans to have a big wedding. Lauren's stepfather and mother end up finally separating, but Lauren does not know that it is because her father and mother are getting back together. Amy is envious of Adrian and Ben getting married and feels that Ricky and her should be getting married instead of Adrian and Ben. Meanwhile Ricky tries to convince Ben not to marry Adrian to take the pressure of marrying Amy off himself. Jack and Madison reconcile and Grant and Grace have a sleepover at Grace's house. Ben suggests an alternative of their parents buying them a condo to a big wedding to Adrian and Adrian throws herself into finding the nicest condo possible while Amy rushes home to see Ricky. Amy tells Ricky she loves him and tries to have sex with him but Ricky turns her down and then she proposes marriage to him.
66	19	"Deeper and Deeper"	Keith Truesdell	Brenda Hampton	April 25, 2011	2.21
Ricky is still amazed from Amy asking him to marry her. Everyone has been pressing Ricky to give Amy an answer, but he does not want to consider Amy and him getting married until they have both graduated from high school. Adrian and Ben continue to look for a condo, but Ben cannot agree on a condo to buy with Adrian and he does not want to move out of his house. Katelyn, the guidance counselor, discusses the possibility about applying for college with Ricky. Ashley has to engage with other home schooled students and George finds her a study buddy named Toby and Toby and her might get along with each other.George wants to get himself a life outside of the house so he asks Nora out on a date unaware that she is gay. Adrian and Amy give each other advice about the respective men in their lives and how to get want they want from them. George has dinner with Nora, but he ends up meeting Nora's distract attorney girlfriend Ollie at the restaurant with Ruben and George feels embarrassed to think he was dating her. Adrian has Ben know that it is okay for him to move out of his house as he can always return there when he wants to.Grant and Grace end up having sex and make a promise to each other in case they fall out of love with each other in the future they will tell each other easily, but they tell each other they love each other. Jack and Madison make a decision to pause having sex and Lauren has a new boyfriend. Anne reminds George that it is time for the both of them to get lives of their own while Amy sees Ricky to withdraw her marriage proposal to him and thinks about moving in with him.
67	20	"Moving In and Out"	Anson Williams	Paul Perlove	May 2, 2011	2.11
No one is happy about Amy's plans to move in with Ricky -- including Ricky. Leo encourages Ricky to think about college, and Anne accuses Amy of rushing things with Ricky as a way of competing with Ben and Adrian. Madison is uneasy with Jack's decision not to have sex with her, and Grace asks her mother for a sleepover with Grant. Amy, on the night she and John were supposed to move in, goes over to Ricky's place only to tell him she isn't ready to move in with him, and they discuss how to work their way up to eventually living together. The episode ends with Ricky telling Amy that he loves her and she reciprocates the statement.
68	21	"Young at Heart"	Keith Truesdell	Brenda Hampton	May 9, 2011	2.05
Adrian and Grace go shopping for wedding dresses and Adrian contemplates getting married in a church. Amy is still having concerns about moving in with Ricky - but he is ready now. In fact, he's getting impatient. He wants to know why Amy is holding him at arm's length. Leo talks with Ben about family fortune. Grace and Kathleen meet Grant's parents. Ashley goes on a date with Toby. Ricky has opportunity to cheat Amy with Karlee, Toby's stepsister, but he refuses. He is frustrated and storms out, because he needs have sex. Ricky and Amy spend time together playing golf.
69	22	"Loose Lips"	Anson Williams	Jeffrey Rodgers	May 16, 2011	2.32
Kathleen, Grace's mom, made invitations for Adrian's shower, but Amy and Grace are stumped as to whom to invite. Adrian realizes she doesn't have any friends, so she decides to invite every girl who has slept with Ricky. Amy gets upset over this, and Ben tries to protect Adrian by talking to Amy, but Ricky insists it's a girl fight and they have to stay out of it. Ben goes to Amy's house and viciously puts Amy down. George walks in mid fight and kicks Ben out. Anne meets her boyfriend from school times. George visits Kathleen, his previous wife. They talk why their marriage split up. Ben holds a grudge against Alice, because she doesn't want go to the baby shower.
70	23	"Round II"	Lindsley Parsons III	Brenda Hampton	May 23, 2011	2.22
Ricky shows up at the Juergens to find out about the fight with Ben. George tells him he handled it and that he told Leo that Ben must apologize to Amy. Ricky is upset and goes to Leo's office. Leo hides in his office from Ricky and Leo's assistant tells Ricky that Leo loves him like a son. Leo realizes he needs to apologize to Amy. Amy accepts his apology wholeheartedly. She knows how much Leo loves his son because George loves her just as much. At school hallway Amy argues with Adrian. Amy points out that Adrian doesn't know how difficult is to be a teenage mother. Adrian replies that her mother was a teenage parent, so she knows this situation from child side. After sharp quarrel they make up. Amy attends Adrian's shower along with other girls who appreciate Adrian for her wonderful qualities. Adrian has a beautiful shower and at last, there is peace.
71	24	"It's Not Over Till It's Over"	Lindsley Parsons III	Brenda Hampton	May 30, 2011	2.12
Adrian makes plans to come back to school a week after the birth of the baby in order to stay on track for graduation. Adrian and Ben both have second thoughts before the wedding, and Ricky realizes that romancing Amy may be more effective than pressuring her for sex.
72	25	"To Be..."	Lindsley Parsons III	Jeffrey Rodgers	May 30, 2011	2.12
Adrian and Ben settle into their condo as Mr. and Mrs. Boykewich. Meanwhile, at Grant High, Katelyn, the guidance counselor, has a banner up in the entrance way of the school to welcome the newly married couple. Grace helps orchestrate the entire school throwing rice at the newlyweds as they enter. Adrian loves the attention but Amy isn't pleased. Madison calls the girls into the bathroom to tell them that she and Jack had sex in Ricky's apartment and that the sex was bad and Jack cried afterwards. Jack admits to his coach that he had sex with Madison and as soon as he started having sex with her he wanted to stop. He and Madison talk and realize that they actually do love each other but aren't ready to have sex yet. Amy gets upset that another couple has had sex in Ricky's bed and that Ricky has slept in his bed with lots of different girls. She tells him to buy a new bed. But when Ricky discusses this with his mom, Nora helps him realize that Amy's probably upset that Ricky's going to college and she might think he's leaving her. Ricky goes to Amy and reiterates that he's never leaving her and John and that he's buying a new bed, as well. He asks her to take a trip with him and get someone on one time together and Amy feels cherished. George calls Camille, Leo's secretary that he met at Ben and Adrian's wedding, and asks her out on a date. Camille says yes, because she's excited and because it gets under Leo's skin that she's going on a date with George. Adrian and Ben are trying to fall asleep in their new condo but Adrian's body is feeling odd. Even though they just had a doctor's appointment Adrian is worried about the baby.
73	26	"... or Not To Be"	Anson Williams	Brenda Hampton	June 6, 2011	3.56
Amy is pleased because she will spend night with Ricky. George stays with John. Jeff, Kathleen's husband returns from Africa and offers her to go with him. Madison's father hears that Madison told Lauren that she never will have sex with Jack. Ashley and Toby test out of school and want to take a trip across United States. Tom dates an older woman with two children. Adrian and Ben prepare to go to the hospital, ready for the arrival of their daughter, but something tragic happens. Madison and Jack are worried they won't be able to keep their promise about not having sex. Amy and Ricky plan on having their special night out of town, but when the friends and family of Adrian and Ben arrive at the hospital to hear the bad news, everyone is devastated. Leo reminds to all of them: Adrian and Ben will never be the same because the baby was stillborn (born dead). At the end of the episode, Amy tells Ricky she wants Ricky now and forever.
