= The Secret Life of the American Teenager season 4 =

The Secret Life of the American Teenager
- Season 4
- No. of episodes: 24

Release
- Original network: ABC Family
- Original release: June 13, 2011 – June 4, 2012

Season chronology
- ← Previous; Season 3 Next → Season 5

The fourth season of The Secret Life of the American Teenager, an American television series created by Brenda Hampton, debuted on the ABC Family television network on Monday, June 13, 2011, at 8:00 PM. During its third season's hiatus, ABC Family announced on January 10, 2011, that the show would be renewed for a fourth season. The fourth season premiered on June 13, 2011, one week after the season 3 finale. The second half of the season premiered on March 26, 2012. On February 2, 2012, ABC Family announced that Secret Life was being renewed for a fifth and final season.

== Main cast ==
- Shailene Woodley as Amy Juergens
- Kenny Baumann as Ben Boykewich
- Mark Derwin as George Juergens
- India Eisley as Ashley Juergens
- Greg Finley as Jack Pappas
- Daren Kagasoff as Ricky Underwood
- Megan Park as Grace Bowman
- Francia Raisa as Adrian Lee
- Steven R. Schirripa as Leo Boykewich
- Molly Ringwald as Anne Juergens

== Episodes ==
No. overall	No. in season	Title	Directed by	Written by	Original release date	U.S. viewers (millions)
74	1	"When One Door Closes..."	Keith Truesdell	Brenda Hampton	June 13, 2011	3.07
Amy goes to visit Adrian, and she tells her that she's moving in with Ricky. At school Ben is having a really bad time and tells Amy how he feels about what he said about not wanting to be a husband and having a baby.
75	2	"...Another One Opens"	Anson Williams	Brenda Hampton	June 20, 2011	2.71
Ricky finds out from Ben that Amy told Adrian that they moved in together; meanwhile, Ben starts telling people that he wants out of the marriage and starts bad mouthing Ricky and Amy's relationship. Ricky confronts Amy about her lying to him about how her dad found out that she moved in with him but later forgives her, and they both agree to be honest with each other no matter what.
76	3	"When Opportunity Knocks"	Keith Truesdell	Brenda Hampton	June 27, 2011	2.81
Ricky's parents find out that Ricky and Amy are living together and ask Amy and Ricky why he didn't tell them.
77	4	"One Foot Out the Door"	Gail Bradley	Paul Perlove	July 4, 2011	1.60
Amy suspects John has an ear infection and persuades Ricky that they need to take John to the hospital. While at the hospital Ricky talks to an ER nurse, he keeps calling Amy his "wife" without noticing. The doctor tells Amy and Ricky that there is nothing wrong with John only that when Amy and Ricky raise their voices John holds his hand to his ear and says 'ow'. Ricky and Amy promise to not argue with each other around John.
78	5	"Hole in the Wall"	Keith Truesdell	Brenda Hampton	July 11, 2011	2.69
Ben has a fight with Adrian after she cleared out their daughter's nursery without telling him, giving away the bear that Ben was given by his mother. Ben storms out and Adrian punches a hole in the wall of the nursery.
79	6	"Don't Go in There!"	Anson Williams	Elaine Arata	July 18, 2011	2.58
Ben wakes up hung-over and decides to move out of his apartment with Adrian. Adrian surprises everyone and returns to school and, to Ben's dismay, acts like nothing is wrong. A nervous Rachel leaves Tom alone with the children while she goes on a business trip. It turns out Tom isn't as excited about being a parent as he thought he would be. Adrian learns from Katelyn (the guidance counselor) if she continues with summer school she'll graduate in time for college in the fall. Adrian lies to Amy and everyone else at school and pretends that she and Ben are happy. Ricky has an interview at a local college, but the interview goes horribly wrong when the interviewer (Karlee Carmichael) hits on him. The situation gets worse when a scorned Karlee tells Katelyn that Ricky won't be getting into school there because he tried to pressure her into sex. Reverend Stone lets slip to Kathleen that Grace's new boyfriend, Daniel, is in college. Daniel stops by to meet Kathleen; she actually takes a liking to him and they end up playing a prank on Grace. Grace tries to sneak out of the house to meet Daniel but ends up in his car alone while Daniel's inside eating dinner with Kathleen. Adrian begs Ben to be civil and at least hold hands with her at school. Ben decides to move back in with Adrian just as friends and he tells her he'll live in the nursery. Adrian couldn't be happier.
80	7	"Cute"	Keith Truesdell	Jeffrey Rodgers	July 25, 2011	2.90
Amy wants to help Ricky with his problems with Karlee. He protests and is upset that she went to the school counselor to discuss this problem. Amy finds Karlee at the university campus and keenly speaks with her. Later on, Amy calls Toby and asks him about Karlee. He says that his stepsister has problems with promiscuity. Nora and Ben go to a restaurant, but they find Ollie and Ruben together. Ollie wants Nora back, but Nora can't resume their relationship. Ruben asks Ben if he would really leave Adrian after what they've been through. The waiter at the restaurant mixes up orders and gives Nora and Ben a bottle of wine. Nora gets drunk after two years of abstinence from alcohol.
81	8	"Dancing With the Stars"	Gail Bradley	Brenda Hampton	August 1, 2011	2.35
It's time for senior prom!! Amy is mad that Ricky doesn't want to go so she pressures him into taking her to prom. Adrian and Ben go together, and Amy finds out Adrian is trying to get pregnant. Later, after the dance Adrian tries to seduce Ben into sleeping with her so she can be prego and keep him in the marriage.
82	9	"Flip Flop"	Keith Truesdell	Kelley Turk & Courtney Turk	August 8, 2011	2.53
Adrian has a change of heart about Ben and instead focuses her energy on getting Ricky back, which brings out Amy's insecurities. Elsewhere, Nora tries to pick up the pieces of her life and rent a room from George.
83	10	"4-1-1"	Anson Williams	Brenda Hampton	August 15, 2011	2.42
Amy feels guilty about checking Ricky's phone. Amy's father and friends assure her that he has checked hers in the past and Ricky confirms it. Meanwhile, a young friend of Ricky's, Ethan, shows up. Madison regrets breaking up with Jack. Elsewhere, Grace plays matchmaker for Adrian by introducing her to a pal of Daniel's named Dante. Ricky and Amy make up and decide to do something crazy together.
84	11	"The Games We Play"	Gail Bradley	Brenda Hampton & Elaine Arata	August 22, 2011	2.51
Adrian is introduced to Omar, the brother of one of Daniel's friends. Ricky tells John about his plans to propose to Amy.
85	12	"Pomp"	Lindsley Parsons III	Brenda Hampton	August 29, 2011	2.38
Lauren and Madison try to convince their parents to let them go to Jesse's graduation party at his parents' lakehouse which is 50 miles away. Ricky is named class valedictorian but doesn't want to write the speech for the graduation ceremony which he does anyway. Meanwhile, Amy tries to convince Ricky to attend the graduation party but he tells her that it's going to be a special evening even if they won't go there. Ricky tells Bunny that he is going to propose to Amy which makes her very happy. He also tells his foster mother who is thrilled. The school counselor gets Jack to write the prayer and Jack gets Grace to help him. Tom is a little disappointed in Jack that he uses Grace's need to help people to do something with Grace. Even though Grace tells everyone she doesn't want to go to the party since her boyfriend is so mature, she wants her mother to allow her to go there. Adrian learns that she will graduate with her class. Adrian admits to Ricky that she still loves him and says that one day they will have sex again so he tries to persuade her to go to a different school in the fall than he does. Grace thinks it's wrong of Adrian to go after Omar, Dante's brother. Omar visits Adrian in the condo where they kiss, he tells her that she won't kiss Ricky again because then she will think about him and this kiss. However she asks Grace for a way to kiss Ricky that she can compare his kisses to Omar's. Alice and Henry explain to Ben that they share custody, so they take turns with Ben. Since Henry wants to go the party together with Ben and Alice wants to hang out with Ben just like they always did on the last day of school, Alice and Henry agree that both of them shouldn't be friends with Ben. Katherine, Grace's mother really misses her husband Jeff which us why she thinks about visiting him for a week in Kenya. Leo is very contented by Nora's work as his assistant and he goes out for an after-work drink with Camille. George thinks that Anne is gay and that she and Nora have a romance. Betty's mother dies and she meets a divorce lawyer who convinces her to go after Leo.
86	13	"And Circumstance"	Keith Truesdell	Brenda Hampton	September 5, 2011	2.83
Amy begins to suspect that Ricky is going to propose, since John keeps saying "ring". Ricky, Jack, and Adrian all have brief flashbacks, thinking of their high school experiences. Ricky thinks of Amy, Jack of Grace, and Adrian of Ricky. Ben invites Adrian to lunch and tells her that they both need to get over Amy and Ricky, especially since there's a rumor going around school that Ricky is planning on proposing to Amy. At the graduation ceremony, Jack and Ricky both give speeches. At the end of Ricky's speech, he calls Amy up on stage and proposes to her, and she happily accepts. At the graduation party, Ben meets a new girl named Dylan. Griffin and Peter have some relationship tension when another guy gets flirtatious with Griffin. Lauren is upset when Jesse tries to give her alcohol, and insists that she's not going to drink or do anything else, even though Jesse and Madison are drinking. Grace and Daniel also have some problems when they run into Daniel's ex-girlfriend, Raven. Raven asks Jack to cut in on Grace and Daniel's dance, which he does. This prompts Daniel to go talk to Raven, and he wants to leave right after speaking with her. Omar agrees to leave with Daniel, over the objections of Adrian and Grace, who want to stay at the party longer. At that moment, Ricky and Amy arrive at the party. Ricky has learned that Adrian wants to kiss him one last time. With Amy's OK, Ricky kisses Adrian and neither of them feel anything. Adrian is ecstatic that she's over Ricky, but Omar is upset that she felt she had to kiss him and thinks that by doing so, she has disrespected herself and him. He and Daniel leave the party. Ricky and Amy begin to slow dance, and Ben and Jack slow dance with the now hurt and alone Adrian and Grace respectively.The next morning, Lauren goes to find Jesse, and discovers him and Madison in bed together. They both blame it on alcohol, but an upset Lauren simply ignores them and asks Ricky and Amy to take her home. Peter also wants to leave, while the other guy wants Griffin to stay longer. Meanwhile, Jack and Raven have also had sex, but agree that it was just a casual thing that doesn't mean anything. Grace asks Jack to take her home, and he goes off to find Adrian so they can leave. He discovers Adrian and Henry in bed together. While Adrian is dressing to leave, Alice walks in on them and suggests to Henry that Ben will probably only want to be her friend once he finds out about Henry and Adrian. Ben and Dylan fell asleep with each other, but did not have sex. Dylan says she doesn't do that, which Ben finds refreshing. Outside, Grace asks Jack if he thinks there's anything to Adrian's theory of kissing someone to see if it's over, which prompts Jack to kiss her. They both seem to enjoy it. Ricky and Amy both comment on what a crazy party it was before kissing each other.
87	14	"Smokin' Like A Virgin"	Gail Bradley	Brenda Hampton	March 26, 2012	2.51
The morning after the graduation party, Ricky asks Amy when she wants to get married, and is surprised to find that Amy is not in a big hurry to get married -- she's just happy to be engaged. Ben and Dylan talk on the phone all day, and he asks her out for that evening. However, when Alice tells him that Henry and Adrian slept together at the party, he breaks their date and angrily confronts Henry. Henry suggests that he was seduced just like Ben was, but Ben tells him that he is no longer welcome in his home and his friend. Dylan and her friends (including Raven) come to confront Ben and demand to know why he broke their date. He invites them to his room, and they ask if he minds if they smoke pot. They are discovered by Leo and Dylan's parents, who have followed her. Raven sends Daniel a camera photo of Jack and Grace kissing early that morning, and Daniel breaks up with Grace as a result. Grace and Jack kiss again, but Kathleen warns Jack that Grace may blame him for Daniel breaking up with her, and that he should simply be friends with Grace and start fresh in college. Ashley returns after being away in Florida with Toby, and announces that she has been accepted at a college in Florida, smugly observing that even though she's a year behind Amy, she'll be a year ahead of her in college. Amy and Ashley trade insults, during which Amy declares all her dreams have come true, and Ashley meanly asks if her dreams included being a teenage mother. Adrian tells Dante' that she has been going out with his brother, and Dante' breaks up with her. She and Grace hatch a plan to live together over the summer, go to summer school and not have anything to do with boys for a while.
88	15	"Defiance"	Anson Williams	Brenda Hampton	April 2, 2012	1.56
Amy argues with Ricky over her decision to attend summer school; Dylan and Ben's parents forbid them from seeing each other.
89	16	"They Gotta Eat"	Lindsley Parsons III	Brenda Hampton & Elaine Arata	April 9, 2012	1.61
Jacob (Jordan Fisher), a high school boy who grew up in rural Africa, wants to stay with Kathleen instead of going off to a boarding school. Kathleen is unsure about this idea, but Jacob will be sticking around. It is revealed that Jacob is Grace's half-brother from an affair her father, Marshall, had years ago. Kathleen is not happy to learn about his existence.
90	17	"Suddenly Last Summer"	Keith Truesdell	Brenda Hampton	April 16, 2012	1.61
Amy is increasingly short with everyone in her life, including Ricky, leaving him wondering what is going on with her, but he is not prepared when she reveals that she might be pregnant again. Dylan's brother Joe who dislike and jealous of Ben send Dylan's parents picture about Dylan and Ben kissing, makes another attempt to win them over, but it doesn't turn out quite like he hoped when he ends up sharing too much information about his family.
91	18	"The Beach is Back"	Gail Bradley	Brenda Hampton	April 23, 2012	1.60
Dylan and her friends surprise Ben at school, while Grace doesn't want Jacob attending her school. Elsewhere, Kathleen tries to understand her late husband's secrets; and an overburdened Amy acts ornery at home with Ricky (when he takes her to band camp).
92	19	"The Splits"	Keith Truesdell	Brenda Hampton	April 30, 2012	1.47
Ben and Dylan go on their first real date together. Elsewhere, Tom runs into problems with police.
93	20	"Strange Familiar"	Anson Williams	Brenda Hampton & Paul Perlove	May 7, 2012	1.51
A desperate Kathleen resorts to bribery to get Grace to talk to Jacob. Elsewhere, Dylan attempts to befriend Adrian.
94	21	"Allies"	Keith Truesdell	Brenda Hampton & Elaine Arata	May 14, 2012	1.40
Amy is in danger of failing summer school. Amy's friends from her New York trip drop by unannounced with their 2 children, and Ricky isn't too happy at first. Henry tries to reconcile with Alice and Ben but it doesn't work. Lauren and Madison become friends again
95	22	"The Text Best Thing"	Anson Williams	Brenda Hampton & Jeffrey Rodgers	May 21, 2012	1.16
A rumor about Anne is spread along with news about Amy's wedding date.
96	23	"4SnP"	Keith Truesdell	Brenda Hampton, Kelley Turk, & Courtney Turk	May 28, 2012	1.40
Ashley and Anne return from Europe. Adrian and Grace becomes jealous from all the attention surrounding Amy.
97	24	"Love is Love"	Gail Bradley	Brenda Hampton & Anne Ramsay	June 4, 2012	1.43
Ben charges $1200 on his credit card to pay the application to Dylan's school. Ben's father finds out and is upset at him for making poor decisions lately. Adrian's mother tells Adrian that kissing Grace for shock value is not right and to think of the LGBTQ community. Anne comes out to her family, with a bad reaction from Amy. George and Ashley are happy that Anne is happy. Ashley kisses Toby, who tells her that he loves her. She responds in kind and that floating around Ricky was just to annoy Amy. Dylan brings Ben to her school and they make s'mores with the bunsen burner. The building burns down and Ben strongly thinks they caused it. He calls Alice and they have sex. Jack tells Grace to kiss Adrian again if she wants to "experiment" as her mother had suggested. When Jack drives Grace over to Adrian's condo, Omar breaks up with Adrian. Grace continues to try to think of ways to see if she is a lesbian or if she was just curious. She comes to school looking so different that Adrian walked right past her without recognizing her. Fern confronts Adrian about kissing a girl just to garner attention and how difficult and scary it can be to be gay, especially in high school. Amy takes Ricky's advice and goes back home to apologize to Anne. Before heading home, she tells Ricky that she wants to run away and get married asap because she didn't want to wait anymore. Amy tells Anne that although they may not be sure of certain things, they do know that "love is love."
