= List of The Secret Life of the American Teenager characters =

The Secret Life of the American Teenager is a television series created by Brenda Hampton. It first premiered on ABC Family on July 1, 2008 and ran until June 3, 2013. The first season featured a cast of eleven main and recurring characters, with characters having both been written in and out of the series in subsequent seasons. The series features multiple guest stars each episode.

The plot focuses on the character of Amy Juergens, a 15-year-old who gets pregnant at band camp before entering high school. It explores how the pregnancy affects her, her peers, and her family. The pregnancy produces a son, John Juergens. In later seasons, after her younger sister starts high school, Amy finds how virtually everyone at school carries a secret or an unexpected problem.

== Main characters ==
=== Cast overview ===
Actor	Character	Seasons				
Actor	Character	1	2	3	4	5
Shailene Woodley	Amy Juergens	Main	Main	Main	Main	Main
Kenny Baumann	Ben Boykewich	Main	Main	Main	Main	Main
Mark Derwin	George Juergens	Main	Main	Main	Main	Main
India Eisley	Ashley Juergens	Main	Main	Main	Main	Special guest
Greg Finley	Jack Pappas	Main	Main	Main	Main	Main
Daren Kagasoff	Ricky Underwood	Main	Main	Main	Main	Main
Jorge-Luis Pallo	Marc Molina	Main				
Megan Park	Grace Bowman	Main	Main	Main	Main	Main
Francia Raisa	Adrian Lee	Main	Main	Main	Main	Main
Molly Ringwald	Anne Juergens	Main	Main	Main	Main	Special guest
Steven R. Schirripa	Leo Boykewich	Recurring	Recurring	Main	Main	Main

=== Amy Juergens ===
Portrayed by Shailene Woodley, Amy gets pregnant by student Ricky Underwood after a one-night stand at band camp before her freshman year of high school. At the beginning of the series, she is 15 years old. Upon entering high school, Amy begins a relationship with Ben Boykewich (also 15), a supportive classmate with whom she falls in love. She confesses her pregnancy to her two best friends, Madison and Lauren, who accidentally spread the gossip that Amy had sex with Ricky. During this time, Amy's 13-year-old sister Ashley discovers her pregnancy due to Amy's recent weight gain and erratic behavior, but promises to keep her secret from their parents. Ben proposes to Amy after finding out, because he genuinely loves her, and feels he would be a better father than Ricky due to his family's financial stability. After Amy tells her parents, she contemplates having an abortion, as she is afraid of her peers' perceptions. She changes her mind, but is still adamant about not returning to school. Ricky reaches out to Amy during this time, saying that he wants to be involved with what happens to the baby. Amy plans to go live with her grandmother Mimsy, but is unable to go after discovering that Mimsy is suffering from Alzheimer's disease, and is moving into assisted care living. Amy returns to school, but is uncomfortable with being known as "the pregnant girl".

Halfway through her pregnancy, Amy's mother Anne informs her that in order to keep the baby, she will have to find a job and daycare. Anne intends to get a job to replace the loss of her husband George's income as they prepare for divorce. Amy is surprised, since she assumed that her mother would stay home and look after the baby, as she had with her daughters. As a result, Amy and Ben marry using fake IDs, but they learn afterwards that the marriage was void since they were both underage. Amy then decides on adoption, and discovers that her father's longtime employee Donovan and his husband Leon want to adopt the baby. The adoption fails due to Ricky's interference, and she ultimately decides to keep the baby due to the love and support of her family and friends.

After Amy decides to keep the baby, Grace and Adrian throw her a baby shower, where Amy then goes into labor. While in the hospital, Amy reprimands Ricky for getting her pregnant, but then realizes that she was equally responsible for what had happened. She gives birth to their son, John, whom she lets Ashley name, and begins to struggle with motherhood.

After breaking up with Ben during her sophomore year, Amy briefly dates Jimmy, the son of her mother's ex-boyfriend, but their relationship ends after he finds a condom in her purse. Not knowing this at first, Amy thinks that Jimmy broke up with her because she was a bad kisser, and asks Ricky to kiss her just to be sure. Adrian finds out about the kiss, and sleeps with Ben in order to get back at both of them (however, Adrian believed it was more than a kiss until Ricky informs her after Adrian and Ben's one-night-stand). Amy and Ben quickly reconcile and get back together around the end of the year.

After being accepted into a summer music program in New York City, Amy decides to go but is surprised to learn that the program is for teen mothers. During this time, Ben reveals to Amy that Adrian had gotten pregnant from their one-night stand, and that he had been keeping her pregnancy from Amy for several weeks. After breaking up with Ben, she develops feelings for Ricky when he comes to visit. She tells him that if he really wants to be with her, he has to stop sleeping around, and get tested for any sexually transmitted diseases.

At the beginning of season four, Amy and Ricky are together and are trying to be a real family for their son. After the stillborn death of Ben and Adrian's daughter, Amy and Ricky begin a sexual relationship. Three months later, Amy moves herself and John into Ricky's little apartment over the butcher shop where he works. Amy decides she wants to marry Ricky, but he thinks she's moving too fast. Later he proposes at their graduation, where he is also valedictorian. At a graduation party, Ricky kisses Adrian one last time; something Amy allowed. The next day, Ricky is surprised that Amy isn't in a hurry to marry, but is content with just being engaged until she feels the time is right for them to marry. Later in the season, Amy thinks she is pregnant again and becomes very moody. Although she finds out that she is not pregnant, she is still irritable. Ricky takes her back to where they first met and Amy begins to become a little more happy and appreciative of Ricky, and more excited about his proposal to her. Shortly after Amy discovers her mother is a lesbian, she tells Ricky that they should elope, to which Ricky agrees. Amy tells everyone that she and Ricky eloped in the season 5 premiere, keeping the fact they changed their minds at the last minute and are in fact not married a secret. The series ends with Amy breaking off the relationship and going to college in New York, leaving John with Ricky.

=== Richard "Ricky" Underwood ===
Portrayed by Daren Kagasoff, Ricky Underwood is the lead male character. His father, Bob, is a drug addict who beat Ricky's mother Nora and sexually abused Ricky as a young child. His mother was both a drug addict and an alcoholic who never helped him out of fear. Ricky was taken away from his parents after the abuse came to light, and put into foster care. As a teenager, Ricky attended Ulysses S. Grant High School, where he was the drummer in the high school marching band and had a reputation of being a promiscuous bad boy. He used to see a therapist, Lauren's father Dr. Ken Fields, who he occasionally visits for advice as an adult. The summer before Ricky's sophomore year, he impregnated Amy Juergens after a one-night stand at band camp, finding out about her pregnancy a few months later. Despite his misgivings over being a good father, Ricky is shown to love and care for his son John. He and Amy go on a date in the fall finale of season 3 and she makes him get tested before considering having sex with him. Ricky tests disease-free, and chooses to not have sex with anyone other than Amy. Their first time having sex after their one-night stand occurred in the wake of dealing with the news of Ben and Adrian's stillborn daughter. Amy and John soon move in with Ricky. Amy finds messages left by Adrian, after telling her she's in love with Ricky. Amy gets caught by Ricky, with him stating they should spend some time apart if she can't trust him. Ricky eventually apologizes to Amy and they get back together. Amy tries to get Ricky to propose by doing "wild" things such as giving him a milkshake and a bath. Ricky ends up being the valedictorian, and at the end of his speech he proposes to Amy. At the graduation party Amy allows Ricky to kiss Adrian one last time to give closure to her. Ricky wants to know when Amy wants to get married, and is taken aback when Amy doesn't seem to be in a hurry to plan their wedding. Amy then has a pregnancy scare, and Ricky is supportive and takes Amy to band camp so she can be happy. Amy tells everyone that she and Ricky eloped in the season 5 premiere even though they pulled out at the last minute. Eventually Amy breaks up with him and leaves John in his care while she goes to New York to attend college.

=== Adrian Lee-Boykewich ===
Portrayed by Francia Raisa, Adrian is the daughter of Ruben Enriquez and Cindy Lee, and the ex-wife of Ben. She is 16 years old. Adrian is both book smart and street smart, hard-edged and emotional. Although she is a straight-A student and a majorette, she has a reputation for being a drama queen and the "school slut". She also has strong feelings for Ricky despite claiming she doesn't anymore since they stopped speaking to each other. Adrian grew up never knowing who her father was, until she went on a search to find him. Her father ended up marrying her mother after 16 years of being apart from each other. Adrian and her parents now live next door to the Juergens family. Her mother is a flight attendant and her father is a District Attorney. Like Ricky, Adrian is also known to use sex to deal with pain. In the episode "Be My, Be My Baby", she reveals that she first had sex when she was fifteen, with her childhood best friend Antonio, who was moving away in order to get cancer treatments. Adrian is infuriated after she finds out that Ricky kissed Amy, believing that it went beyond kissing, although it was a mostly innocent encounter. Adrian has a one-night-stand with Ben in retaliation, and ends up becoming pregnant with his child. She has her mind set on abortion, but eventually reconsiders and decides to keep the baby. Adrian's decision receives positive support from her father and even Amy, who had called her to let her know that she was giving Adrian the same offer of a friendship between them that she had given her in the past, because their children might end up becoming friends. Adrian later finds out that she is having a baby girl, which both she and Ben are excited about, and she and Ben later marry. Adrian gives birth to their daughter Mercy, who is tragically stillborn due to heart failure. Adrian and Ben are both devastated by Mercy's death. After this, Ben realizes he no longer loves Adrian, and that he may never have truly loved her. Ben decides that he wants a divorce. When she finds out, Adrian tries to get pregnant again, believing that they will fall back in love and be happy again if she has another baby. When this doesn't work, she decides he should leave. After Ben departs, Adrian realizes she still loves Ricky, and begins dating a guy named Dante in an attempt to make Ricky jealous. In the process, she meets Dante's brother, Omar, and begins dating him, because Dante left the country without an explanation. But Ricky has other plans – he ends up proposing to Amy at their graduation. Adrian wants one last kiss from Ricky, to see if she still has feelings for him. At the graduation party, she receives the kiss and is happy to discover that the kiss leaves her unmoved; however, Omar is at the party and is offended by Adrian kissing Ricky, and leaves. Disconsolate, Adrian has sex with Henry. The next day, she realizes that she has made a mistake, and repeatedly calls Omar, who does not answer her calls. To her surprise, Dante arrives back from his semester abroad. When she tells him that she has been seeing his brother, he breaks up with her. Adrian and her best friend Grace are fed up with boys, and decide to enroll in summer school together. Shortly after, Adrian gets a letter in the mail, stating that she is legally divorced from Ben. She then completes summer school and shows signs of still being in love with Ricky. She falls back in love with Omar, but denies his proposal of marriage, wanting to wait until her schooling is complete.

=== Benjamin "Ben" Boykewich ===
Portrayed by Ken Baumann, Benjamin "Ben" Boykewich is the 15-year-old son of Leo Boykewich, and Amy's high school boyfriend and first love. He meets Amy after his best friend Alice points her out one day at school, and they begin dating and fall in love. He offers to marry Amy when he finds out she's pregnant, but she declined his offer at the time. When Amy's mother Anne, tells her that she must support her baby on her own, she changed her mind and decides to marry Ben, as his family is financially stable. Amy and Ben marry with fake ID's, but discover that their marriage is null and void because they are both minors. They eventually break up after Amy's baby is born and Ben can't handle seeing her bond with Ricky. Adrian finds out she is pregnant with Ben's baby after a one-night stand essentially ruining Ben's chances of a relationship with Amy and they eventually get together. They marry and move in together before their baby is born with the financial support of Ben's father. After their baby is born stillborn Ben can't handle Adrian anymore and decides to divorce her against her wishes. At the end of the series, Ben and Amy attend the same university.

=== Ashley Juergens ===
Portrayed by India Eisley, Ashley Juergens is the younger daughter of Anne and George, and Amy's younger sister. She is mature, observant, and sarcastic, tending to speak in a low, monotone voice. Ashley is the first member in the Juergens family to learn of Amy's pregnancy. She is often forgotten by her family and remarks that she could get away with anything. However, Ashley's main concern is keeping her family together. Ashley believed that Amy's baby would reunite her dividing family and worked hard to discourage Amy from adoption. After the baby was born, she named her nephew John since she thought it was simple and classic. During the third season she developed feelings for Ricky. She stays away from Ricky, for benefit of Amy and Ricky, but is told to back down by Amy so that she and Ricky can see if they can try to be a couple. Ashley passes her GED after a brief stint in home-schooling and travels across the US with her new friend, Toby. They end up broke in Florida and stay with his grandmother, earning money with various part-time jobs. Ashley returns home the day after Ricky's graduation and announces that she will be attending college in Florida in the fall. In Season 5, Ashley's relationship with Toby has progressed into a sexual relationship. Her father is very upset once hearing this, but Ashley explains that they are in love and practicing safe-sex. After coming back from a trip to Europe with her mother, she finds out that she was accepted to a cooking school in Italy. Both George and Anne say no to the idea, so she ends up running away with the help of her grandmother Mimsy, who gives her ten thousand dollars.

=== Jack Pappas ===
Portrayed by Greg Finley, Jack Pappas is a high school sophomore and quarterback on the football team. His stepfather, Reverend Stone, is the minister of the church where he and Grace first met. He cheats on Grace in the first episode when he has oral sex with Adrian, and is then caught kissing her at the school dance. Grace eventually forgives him, and they start to date in secret because of her parents' disapproval. To Jack's dismay, Ricky pretends to be dating Grace as a cover for her parents. Their relationship ends again when a security camera catches Ricky saving Grace from two men after Jack left her in a bad part of town. He is shown to be clearly jealous over Ricky, which prompts him to tell Grace that he only started dating her because his stepfather asked him to. He eventually breaks up with Grace and moves in with Tom in Grace's family's guest house, even though he still loves Grace. He later dates Madison and they break up after summer vacation. Jack and Madison reunite, and although they are back together, Madison becomes very jealous that Jack is living with Grace's family. He moves out of the guest house and into the big house (where Grace lives) because Tom's new girlfriend and her children move into the guest house with Tom. Jack's room is next to Grace's which makes Madison even more nervous about their relationship. Later on, Jack and Madison break up, because he is still in love with Grace. Jack is chosen to give the invocation at the graduation ceremony, and Grace helps him write it. At the end of season 4 they share a kiss to see if they still have feelings for each other. The kiss is captured on a cell phone, and the picture is sent to Grace's current boyfriend, Daniel. Jack is jubilant when Grace's boyfriend breaks up with her, but Grace's mother suggests that since he is going to college in a few months, perhaps he'd be better off just being friends with Grace and taking advantage of new college experiences. He tries to date by sleeping with a girl named Clementine, who is an old friend of Ricky's, but realizes that he still wants to be with Grace. After they get back together, Grace discovers his recent relationship with Clementine, and has trouble trusting him. Jack is in critical condition after a pimp beat him with a baseball bat in his dorm room for paying an underage prostitute without sex and helping her escape. Jack eventually ends up marrying Madison. They also move to New York. Jack becomes a coach at St. Francis.

=== Grace Bowman ===
Portrayed by Megan Park, Grace Bowman is the biological daughter of Marshall and Kathleen Bowman and the younger sister of the adopted Tom Bowman. Grace is 18 years old. She is in 12th grade and an ex-cheerleader. At the beginning of the show, Grace was a devout religious person and does her best to be stay true to her religion. Originally, she was in a relationship with Jack, but they had a lot of disagreements over whether or not to have sex. Grace believed in waiting until marriage, and even wore a promise ring to prove it. She and Jack later break up after he has oral sex with Adrian. She briefly becomes involved with Ricky, but breaks up with him after discovering that he's still sleeping with Adrian. Grace and Jack get back together when Amy has John. In the second season opener, she and Jack decide to have sex. She quickly regrets her decision after the sudden death of her father. She later on becomes involved with Grant, the cousin of Griffin. Grant and Grace bond over their shared desire to become doctors, and strengthen that bond over a summer at MED camp. In her endeavors to become a doctor, she visits Africa with her doctor stepfather, where she cheats on Grant with Daniel, a college student. Grant and Grace later break up and she begins to date Daniel, but their relationship isn't smooth due to his greater maturity. Grace becomes jealous of Daniel's ex-girlfriend at the graduation party and Daniel leaves. Grace and Jack share a kiss the next morning after the party, which is captured on a cell phone by Daniel's ex-girlfriend, Raven. Raven texts the picture to Daniel, and he breaks up with Grace, realizing that she still has feelings for Jack. Grace later confesses to Adrian that she thinks she may still be in love with Jack. Also, Grace kissed Adrian and questions her sexuality. All signs point to her either being lesbian or bisexual. She and Jack end their engagement and she moves to New York and becomes a doctor.

=== George Juergens ===
Portrayed by Mark Derwin, George Juergens is the estranged husband of Anne Juergens, the father of Amy, Ashley and Robbie Juergens, and the maternal grandfather of John Juergens. George is a comically blunt, somewhat immature and often oblivious man, but one who loves his family and tries hard to protect them and keep them together. His first wife was Kathleen Bowman, a woman who married him for sex. George, a furniture salesman, met Anne while she was in college. He and Anne eloped shortly after discovering Anne was pregnant with Amy. Two years later, they had Ashley. It is later found out that he cheated on Anne with other women. The two get a divorce and remarried and separate again. He also has another son with Anne, Robbie. He currently lives at his children's childhood home with his dog. When everyone moves out, he invites Ricky's mother, Nora, to move in with him as a roommate. She moves into Ashley's garage bedroom. George and Anne still feel a spark for each other, but Anne seems intent on seeing the divorce go through. After George realizes Anne really is gay and he has no more feelings for her, he starts to date his first wife Kathleen (Grace and Tom's mother) again. They realize they still have their spark and that they are still in love.

=== Anne Juergens ===
Portrayed by Molly Ringwald, Anne Juergens is the daughter of Mimsy and Robert, the divorced wife of George Juergens, the mother of Amy, Ashley and Robbie Juergens and the maternal grandmother of John Juergens. She is a responsible, practical, and naturally independent woman who tries to install the same virtues in her daughters. Anne met George while she was majoring in Women's Studies at college. When Anne discovered she had become pregnant with Amy, she reluctantly dropped out of college, married George and became a wife. Two years later, she had Ashley, and another 14 years after that, she had Robbie. She and George separated after she became tired of his womanizing and realized that she was not happy in the marriage. She dated an architect for a while, and they planned to marry when she became pregnant, thinking it was his child; he later confessed that he could not have children, and she realized that Robbie was George's son. She lived with her mother for a while after her separation from George, but when her mother went into a home for Alzheimer's patients, she was on her own, and began to see a high school sweetheart for companionship, but the relationship didn't go anywhere. She and George made an attempt to get back together and she took over the design portion of his furniture business, but again she finds poorly-hidden evidence that he was unfaithful, and resumed divorce proceedings. In season 5, after George spreads the truth as a rumor around town, Anne Juergens comes out to her family as a lesbian. She walks in her house one day when Nora (Ricky's birth mother) was having an AA meeting with all lesbians attending. Anne gets to know one of them closely and invited her to stay the night. They plan to go out on a date.

=== Leo Boykewich ===
Steve Schirripa portrays Leo Boykewich, Ben's widowed father. He owns the local butcher shop, and is known as "The Sausage King". Leo is one of the first people to suspect Amy's pregnancy due to her huge appetite and nausea. He even supported Ben's decision to marrying Amy since he met Ben's mother when they were in high school. He's usually portrayed as the voice of reason for many of the characters on the shows. Such as when he tells Ben off for believing that he can support Amy's baby with his money. He gives Ben and Ricky jobs at the butcher shop as a way to help support Amy. In the second season, Leo begins to date a woman named Betty, who is the prostitute Tom had once hired. It was later revealed by Betty that she was very upfront about her profession the first day she introduced herself to Leo, because she was afraid of embarrassing him. He later proposes to Betty, but she explains that she may still be married to her ex. He promises to hunt down her husband, who turns out to be dead, and they marry in an elaborate ceremony. Leo takes Ricky under his wing by allowing him to live in the upstairs apartment. He is upset when Ben and Adrian discover they are having a baby, and tries to caution Ben from marrying Adrian just because she is pregnant. Ben is insistent, however, so Leo purchases a condo for the newlyweds. When Ben is ambivalent about being married, Leo sternly tells him that he made the choice, and he now has to make the best of it. When the baby is stillborn, Leo tearfully breaks the news to Ben and Adrian's friends at the hospital, and then later supports Ben's decision to get a divorce. In Season 4, Leo questions whether or not he wants to be married to Betty anymore when he suspects that his longtime assistant, Camille, is in love with him. Even so, Leo decides to stick with the marriage because he believes that is the right thing to do. Betty later decides that she wants a divorce and Leo agrees to it. He later sends Camille flowers and a bracelet and invites her out to dinner. While talking in the car on the way to dinner Camille kisses Leo, and the two are later seen together at graduation. They marry in the fifth season, and decide to adopt a young girl who was the underaged prostitute that Jack helped.

== Recurring characters ==
The following is a list of characters that are, or at one time were, a recurring guest on the series.

=== Nora Underwood ===
Anne Ramsay portrays Nora Underwood, Ricky's biological mother. For the majority of the first season, she is a distant character in Ricky's past. She has been to jail a few times due to drug possession and Ricky often felt bitter towards her because she failed to protect him from his father's abuse. But in season 3, episode 7, she comes back into his life to spend time with her son before she gets put back in jail. Ruben Enriquez (Adrian's father), as a DA helps Ricky get his mother out of jail, as he is willing to try and forgive her. Later on in the season, the two begin to repair the relationship, however, she was unsure about telling him she has a girlfriend, but she later does, and is gratified when Ricky seems pleased for her. The relationship doesn't last, though, and after a night of binge drinking (with the purported intent of convincing Ben that he shouldn't drink) she moves out of Margaret and Shakur's home and moves in with George Juergens, who initially tries to make a play for her, but remains pals when he discovers that she is a lesbian. She is very proud of Ricky's accomplishments in spite of his shaky childhood.

=== Henry Miller & Alice Valko ===
Allen Evangelista portrays Henry 'Hank' Miller, who has been Ben's friend since the third grade. He is now dating Alison 'Alice' Valko (who is portrayed by Amy Rider), who has also become a friend of Ben's and some of the girls in school. Alice is very smart and knows a lot of factual information, while Henry is a bit more social. They have and discuss sex quite often, but fairly maturely. In the first episode, Alice pointed out Amy to Ben. In season 4 Henry breaks up with Alice and the two try "shared custody" of Ben, which is awkward and doesn't work out. In the 13th episode of Season 4, Alice walks into a bedroom after a graduation party to find Henry in bed with Adrian. Angrily, she tells Ben what she found, and Ben tells Henry he is no longer welcome in his home. After Ben finds out that he can no longer date Dylan, a sad conversation with Alice turns into sex. Henry thinks that there is something going on that he doesn't know about and pressures Alice to tell him. Ben doesn't know that Alice told Henry, and is mad at him for kissing Dylan.

=== Marc Molina ===
Jorge Pallo portrays Marc Molina, who was the school guidance counselor and was a big hit with the girls at the start of the school year. Before Amy reveals her pregnancy to her two best friends, Lauren and Madison, they gab about the new counselor, asking if she has something better to talk about than him. He's always helping people, especially Ben and Adrian. He disappeared before the season break, with people saying that he ran off with Adrian, but no one really knew why he was gone. It was later revealed that he left to get married. We later find out that his wife was his crazy girlfriend that he talked about with Ben and also that he was once a cop until his wife made him quit the force. Marc believes he married the wrong person, but it is revealed that his wife is pregnant when she comes to Amy's baby shower. He eventually resigned because he needed a better job to support his growing family.

=== Mimsy Scott Levy ===
Alice Hirson portrays Mimsy, Anne's mother, Amy, Ashley and Robie's grandmother and John Juergens great-grandmother. She has the beginnings of Alzheimer's disease and recently moved to an assisted care home. It is stated that she likes everyone better than Anne, and Anne is reluctant to tell her about anything in her life, such as her marital problems with George as well as her pregnancy. Anne and Amy worry about her sometimes. Mimsy is reported as having suffered a slight stroke and therefore, Anne and George miss John's first birthday to go to her side. Mimsy surprises Anne and George with the news that she has married a gentleman named Eugene Levy. In season 5, Ashley takes advantage of her Alzheimer's and convinces Mimsy to give her $10,000 to run away to Italy for cooking school. Alice Hirson previously portrayed Jenny Jackson, mother of Annie Camden in 7th Heaven.

=== Kathleen Bowman ===
Josie Bissett portrays Kathleen Bowman, who is the mother of Grace Bowman, adoptive mother of Tom Bowman, the ex-wife of George Juergens, and new wife of Jeff Tseguay. She cheated on George during their marriage. As a teen, Kathleen's mother did not let her have any physical contact with any boys. She told Grace that she only married George for sex. She waited until she married Marshall Bowman to have sex with him. She becomes a widow after Marshall dies in a private jet crash and began dating a younger man named Dr. Jeff Tseguay, a gynecologist, much to Grace's displeasure. Kathleen and Jeff are so excited that Grace suddenly seems to be in favor of the marriage that they impulsively decide to marry right away. Kathleen therefore changed her name from "Bowman" to "Tseguay". Kathleen tries to balance supervising Tom's special needs with his desire to be independent, and tries to get Grace to behave responsibly when it comes to sex. Kathleen then gets back together with George Juergens in a serious relationship.

=== Tom Bowman ===
Luke Zimmerman portrays Tom Bowman, Grace's adopted older brother, who has Down syndrome. His mother died earlier in his life, and then he was adopted by the Bowmans. With the normal drives of a young man, he is interested in sex—at one point, he calls an "escort" service and a prostitute named Betty comes in response to his call. They do not have sex, but she spends the evening talking with him and allowing him to confess his frustrations. Later, he meets Tammy and wants to marry her, despite having only been on one date with her. Tammy ends up marrying someone else. He sometimes refers to Ricky as "Drummer Boy" and cares deeply about Grace. He mistakes Adrian's manipulation of him to borrow money as interest in him, and tries to respond, with no luck. When it is first announced that Adrian is pregnant, Tom proposes to her, and promises to take care of her. She gently refuses him. He and Jack share the Bowman's guesthouse for a while when Tom is impatient for more independence than Kathleen is willing to allow him. Jack moves into the main house when Tom begins dating a woman with two children that he met on the bus on his way to work as a Vice President of Human Resources.

=== Dr. Marshall Bowman ===
John Schneider portrays Dr. Marshall Bowman, Grace's overprotective father. He's also the partner of the Juergens' pediatrician, Dr. Hightower, which is how he found out about Amy's pregnancy. Marshall later admits to Ricky that his brother was sexually abused by his neighbor and later died by suicide. Marshall dies when his private jet crashes, leaving Grace thinking the crash was all her fault because she had sex with her boyfriend, Jack, after Marshall told her not to. His body was cremated and spread on a hole in a golf course. It was discovered in Season 4, that Marshall had a relationship with another woman while he was in Zimbabwe and they had a son together named Jacob.

=== Madison Cooperstein ===
Renee Olstead portrays Madison Mildred Cooperstein. She is in 12th grade, she's one of Amy's best friends, and her values are defined by her Catholicism. Madison unintentionally spreads gossip and rumors, though she is a well-meaning girl. She dated Lauren's brother, Jason, and unintentionally spread the news of Amy's pregnancy. She feels ignored by Amy because she is spending more time with Ben than with her. Madison broke up with Jason but started to have feelings over the breakup. It is revealed that her mother died. Madison seems to have a crush on Jack and might have done something with him over the summer. She does not want a relationship with Jack despite fooling around with him. After Jack and Grace's relationship fizzles, Jack begins to date Madison. Madison, hoping to reassure Jack that she is a "free spirit" and doesn't want to trap him, tells Jack that she's not interested in children or marriage. This causes Jack to rethink the relationship because, as he tells her, the whole idea of dating is to find someone that you might want to marry. Since she says she doesn't want to marry, perhaps he should be dating elsewhere. Madison quickly recants and tells Jack that she is interested in a family and children, but not for a long time. They resume their relationship, and while Madison is seriously considering having sex with Jack, she confesses that she isn't quite ready, wanting the occasion to be special and wearing a pretty dress and having her make-up done. Jack tells her that he is fine with waiting. So, to get around having actual sex, Madison and Jack often have oral sex. After school ends, Madison sleeps over at the Bowman guest house (where Jack stays) and lies about where she spent the night. When her father gets an email from Lauren, he forbids Madison and Jack to date. Madison later tries to date her former supervisor, whom her father discovers lied about his age, and proceeds to kick him out of his home. Madison lost her virginity to Jack after Adrian and Ben's wedding, but because she and Jack regret having sex, they decide to discontinue any sexual activity. At the graduation party Madison has sex with Lauren's boyfriend, Jesse. Lauren tells her that she hates her, orders her out of her house when Madison comes to apologize, and rips up a photo of the two of them. Lauren forgives her.

=== Lauren Treacy ===
Camille Winbush portrays Lauren Treacy, who is also in the 12th grade and one of Amy's best friends. She is smart, practical, and seems to be the voice of reason for Amy. Her father is Ricky's therapist. Along with Madison, Lauren also accidentally spread the news of Amy's pregnancy. She made out with Ricky one night in his car. She also feels ignored by Amy. Her parents are divorced, and her mother is remarried. Lauren is now dating Jesse, and plans to have sex with him when Madison and Jack have sex. After her parents find out that she and Jesse slept over at Jack's guest house and she lied about it, her father and mother ban her from seeing and being with Jesse. She and Jesse break up, but then get back together when they realize they still care for each other. Jesse throws an all-night graduation party, where he drinks too much and ends up in bed with Madison after Lauren makes it clear that she neither intends to drink or have sex that night. Angrily, she breaks up with Jesse and tells Madison that she hates her.

=== Jason Treacy ===
Andrew McFarlane portrays Jason Treacy, Lauren's older brother and Madison Cooperstein's ex-boyfriend. He's a member of the Grant High Football team and portrayed as an excellent student, proven by the fact that he was the only other student besides Grace Bowman to be accepted into the Young Healers Camp program, for students who aspire to be doctors. At med camp, he and Grace became extremely attracted to one another because of all the time they spent together, and eventually they kissed. However, before returning home, they agreed to only be friends, but Jason still broke up with Madison before the next school year began. Along with Grace and her new boyfriend, Grant, he also attended the Young Healers Camp again the following summer.

=== Dr. Jeff Tseguay ===
Reid Scott portrays Dr. Jeff Tseguay, Grace's step-father. Jeff met Kathleen during the aftermath of Marshall's death—his brother died in the same plane crash that killed Marshall. Kathleen and Jeff's relationship is inadvertently discovered by Jack when he is in a drug store and witnesses Kathleen and Jeff purchasing contraceptives. He agrees not to tell Grace, but Kathleen decides to go ahead and tell Grace anyway, knowing that her interest in another man only six months after Marshall's death will deeply upset her. One evening, Kathleen is at Jeff's house and Jeff decides not to answer a phone call from his mother. His mother becomes concerned and bursts in on the couple talking in bed, much to Jeff's chagrin, Kathleen's embarrassment, and his mother's interest. Their relationship escalates quickly, and upon Grace's pretense at encouragement, they decide to marry. The day after the wedding, Jeff talks to Grace and tells her that he feels that they got off on the wrong foot, and, as her new stepfather and as an obstetrician/gynecologist, invites her to talk about her misgivings. During the talk, Grace begins to sort out her conflicted feelings about sex. Jeff later joins a medical team working for an extended period in Africa, where Grace visits him and meets Daniel. Jeff invites Kathleen to join him in Africa for a few months, and although tempted, she doesn't feel that she can leave Tom and Grace.

=== Betty Boykewich ===
Jennifer Coolidge portrays Betty, who meets and interests Leo Boykewich. She is upfront about telling him that she has been a prostitute, because she doesn't want him embarrassed when he finds out, but he decides he doesn't care. He discovers that she can't marry him because she is still married to a man she hasn't seen in a long time. Leo locates her husband, only to find that he has died, and he proposes. When Ben is conflicted over having sex with Adrian, Betty offers to listen to his problems, but Ben rudely turns her away, telling her he doesn't need advice from a prostitute. She is hurt, but soon bounces back. When Ben sincerely apologizes for his outburst, she assures him that she has already forgotten it, and goes on to encourage Ben to act on his feelings. Betty and Leo are married in a lavish wedding with Ben inviting all his friends to celebrate. Betty clumsily but earnestly attempts to console Adrian after the loss their baby. In season 4 she decides that she realizes that Leo is not happy and tells him she wants a divorce and wants to go to college. In one of the last episodes of the season her mother dies and while awaiting a flight on her soon-to-be ex-husband's private jet she is approached by a divorce lawyer.

=== Robert "Bob" Underwood ===
Bryan Callen portrays Robert "Bob" Underwood, Ricky's biological father who has been to jail for drugs and child molestation. In Season 1 during one episode he comes back to find Ricky, and wants to sell Ricky and Amy's baby. Later, he is caught with drugs and sent back to prison.

=== Margaret Shakur ===
L. Scott Caldwell portrays Margaret Shakur, Ricky's foster mother and John Juergens' foster grandmother. Margaret and her husband love Ricky as their own, and are proud to be his parents. Later, Margaret and Sanjay have dinner with Anne and George to discuss Ricky's custody case, and expressing a desire to be a part of John's life. Margaret helped Adrian with her decision about whether or not to terminate her unplanned pregnancy. Later, Ricky's birth mother, Nora, moves in with Margaret and Sanjay when starting her life over, and they have become good friends. Margaret decides to take in one of Ricky's former foster brothers, Ethan, who ends up in juvenile detention after sexting nude pictures of an underage girl to his friends when she breaks up with him. Because of overcrowding in juvenile detention, Ethan will return to live with Margaret.

=== Cindy Lee Enriquez ===
Paola Turbay portrays Cindy Lee, Adrian's mother. Cindy got pregnant with Adrian as a teenager on purpose because she wanted the love of a baby, but her guilt of trapping Ruben Enriquez, Adrian's father, into being a father caused her to keep Ruben out of their lives. She raised Adrian alone and worked as a flight attendant; causing her to be away from home a lot. At the start of the show, she and George Jurgens had an affair that ended around the time George found out about Amy's pregnancy. She was also unaware of Adrian's affairs and her moniker as the "school slut" until Ruben told her. Despite this, Cindy continues to work, leaving Adrian alone, where Adrian continues to have sex. Cindy and Ruben later reunite after he leaves his wife, and she declines a job promotion in New York so they can marry. After a minor case of cold feet, Cindy and Ruben decide to marry the day before Leo and Betty's wedding in a judge's office. Much to Cindy's consternation, Ruben's mother has sent a completely inappropriate wedding dress to wear — an ugly red, flouncy dress several sizes too large. After a moment of anger, Cindy shrugs and she and Ruben are married, with Adrian as a witness. When Adrian reveals that she's pregnant, Cindy tells her daughter that she will stand behind Adrian, whether or not she decides to have an abortion. This spawns an argument between her and Ruben since he's Catholic. They later make up and support Adrian's decision to have the baby. Cindy and her husband are present for Adrian and Ben's wedding, and she later tries to comfort her daughter after the baby's stillbirth.

=== Ruben Enriquez ===
Philip Anthony-Rodriguez portrays Ruben Enriquez, Adrian's father and the ex-boyfriend of Cindy. He was not involved with Adrian during her childhood years because he and Cindy made a deal not to see each other. When Adrian eventually finds him, Ruben tells Adrian he wants nothing do with her, but later decides to help her turn her life around for the better. Ruben is an Assistant District Attorney and is married for the third time. Adrian is his second biological child (he has a biological son in Mexico), however, he has two stepsons. For confidentiality reasons, he could not tell Adrian that he had known the truth about Ricky having been sexually abused. He and Cindy marry before a judge, "Fast Eddy", the day before Leo and Betty marry. When his daughter becomes pregnant, Ruben strongly objects to the idea of her having an abortion. This causes conflict between Ruben and his wife, who supports Adrian's decision. Adrian chose to keep the baby, and Ruben couldn't have been happier. When Adrian's daughter, later named "Mercy" is born stillborn, he blames himself for pushing Adrian to keep the baby instead of having an abortion.

=== Rev. Sam Stone ===
Tom Virtue portrays Rev. Sam Stone, Jack's stepfather and the minister at the local church. Jack told him why Grace thinks her father has died. He tried, unsuccessfully, to make Grace see that she and Jack having sex had nothing to with her father's death. He also helped Amy find couples to adopt her unborn baby (John) when she was pregnant. After offered a job at his alma mater in Phoenix, Arizona as the head of the Philosophy department, he gives up the church and moves with his wife, leaving Jack to complete his senior year. He makes a cameo appearance to marry Ben and Adrian.

=== Griffin ===
Brando Eaton portrays Griffin, who is in 9th grade like Ashley, and is her friend. He and Ashley clicked as friends when he asked her to sit with him at lunch. After she asks him if all he wants is to have sex with her, Griffin tells Ashley that he is gay. George likes Griffin after meeting him because Ashley did not pick a guy friend who only wants her for sex. It's revealed that his two older brothers are also gay. He fixes Ashley up with his cousin, Grant, and brings his date, Michael, to Leo and Betty's wedding. After Ashley uses Grant, Griffin decides to introduce him to Grace Bowman. In return, Grace introduces Griffin to Peter, a guy she knew from church, and it was an instant connection for both couples.

=== Grant ===
Grant Harvey portrays Grant, Griffin's awkward but engaging cousin, who is not gay and is interested in Ashley. He is put up to a blind date with Ashley by Griffin, and finds himself attracted to her. At first, George isn't concerned, thinking that since Grant is related to Griffin, he must be gay, too. He is taken aback to discover that Grant is not gay, but decides to trust Ashley not to make the same mistake that Amy did. He wants to have sex with Ashley. After a party held by Leo and Ben, Grant finds interest in Grace, and is now dating her. He and Grace stay abstinent through their summer at Med Camp, and have sex after school starts when Grant's parents are out of town. Grant then told Grace that he loved her. Later, Grant's parents come to the Bowman-Tseguay residence and it is found that Grant's father is quite old, but charms the hearts of both Grace and Kathleen.

=== Katelyn O'Malley ===
Beverley Mitchell portrays Katelyn O'Malley. Katelyn is the most recent school guidance counselor. It is revealed in season 4 that like Ben and Adrian, she lost a child when her baby died of SIDS. She also explains that her marriage fell apart as well when her husband became an alcoholic.

=== Dylan ===
Dylan is introduced during the graduation party. Henry points her out and Ben goes after her. Dylan's parents are very protective over her and it takes a while for them to be convinced that it is okay for them to date. Ben's father and Dylan's parents catch Dylan and her friends smoking pot in Ben's room. They are then forbidden to see each other. After some convincing they are allowed to go out again but they accidentally burn down Dylan's school, and they are forbidden to see each other again. Even though her friend, Wendy, told her that she overheard Ben telling Amy that he still loves her, she still wants to date Ben. They come up with this idea that her parents could meet Henry and pretend to go out with Henry, but instead meet Ben. Ben's father finds out and forbids him from going. At her house, Henry is mad at Ben for sleeping with Alice and plans to make revenge by going out with Dylan for real. So he forces her to stay home and have a real date. Dylan is furious with Henry, but they still kiss. Dylan then finds out that Ben and Alice slept together and doesn't really want to go out with Ben anymore so she gives Henry a chance. She is portrayed by Ana Lucasey.

=== Jesse ===
Austin Stowell portrays Jesse. He became Lauren's boyfriend in season 2. After sleeping at Jack's guest room with Madison and Lauren, Lauren is banned from seeing Jesse. At his graduation party, where he drinks too much, Lauren discovers him sleeping with Madison.

=== Kathy ===
Kathy is portrayed by Cierra Ramirez, introduced in the 100th episode as a new freshman whom Amy mentors as part of a senior project. She got pregnant by her much older ex-boyfriend, and plans on giving her baby girl up for adoption. She is initially wary about talking to Amy because unlike her, she chose to raise a child as a teenager. Kathy eventually opens up to her about her worries on not having friends because of her condition. She currently lives with her grandmother because her parents kicked her out. Kathy explains early on that even though her baby will have an open adoption, she has no plans to be involved in the child's life. She meets Ethan and they start connecting about their histories and even go on a double-date with Amy and Ricky. Their relationship hits a speed bump in the road after Ethan makes a disastrous first impression to the prospective parents, who later tell Kathy to break-up with him. They quickly get back together in the fall season finale. In the holiday special, Kathy goes into labor on Christmas Eve and gives birth to a baby girl on Christmas Day. The adoptive parents name her Hedy.

=== Ethan ===
Played by Michael Grant, Ethan is Ricky's 14-year-old foster brother who ran away from their house a few years after stealing a knife from Margaret and Shaker. He first appears when he gets into trouble for sending naked pictures of his ex-girlfriend to everyone in his contacts, which ultimately lands him in juvenile detention. Margaret decides to take him in again, and forces him to go back to school. In season 4 he is forced to go to summer school and immediately gets into trouble for stealing condoms from the nurse's office. Despite his actions, Ricky still tries to instill sense in him remembering his early days before he met Amy. He begins dating Kathy, who is pregnant with her ex-boyfriend's child. They decide to take their relationship slowly, but Ethan has trouble respecting Kathy's boundaries. Such as when he meets the prospective parents of Kathy's unborn daughter, and asks rude and personal questions about them. Kathy breaks up with him when her prospective parents think he is too unstable to be around. Ethan later confides to Kathy that his parents disown him when he was a kid, causing his distrust in adults. After meeting Kathy, Ethan tries several times to get advice from Ben on how to be a good boyfriend to someone who is having a child with another guy, but Ben shows no interest in helping him. In the episode "Holly Rollers", he is shown to be a talented piano player. Then he and Amy start getting closer and closer while Amy and Ricky get farther.

== Minor characters ==
The following is a list of characters that appear on the show, but usually do not add to the overall plot or story line of the series.

=== Mrs. Virginia Molina ===
Constance Marie portrays Mrs. Virginia Molina, Mr. Molina's new wife. They are expecting a baby around the same time as Amy. She shows up at Amy's baby shower after being invited by Joe.

=== John Juergens Underwood ===
Amy and Ricky's now three-year-old son whom they conceived on a night at band camp when Amy was a freshman and Ricky was a sophomore in high school. Ashley (Amy's sister) is the one who suggested John's name because "his life was going to be complicated already, so we might as well give him an easy name." His birthday is 06/06/09. His parents Amy and Ricky break apart from their marriage plans and Amy goes to college, leaving Ricky as a single father.

=== Mrs. Stone ===
Kristin Bauer van Straten portrays Mrs. Stone, Jack's mother. She met her second husband at grief counseling. Her voice is heard once yelling at Jack when he throws a football into the window. She and her husband tell Jack about his new job in Arizona, requiring Jack to find a new place to live to prevent him from relocating during his senior year. And at one of the last episodes of 2012 she shows up at the last few minutes of the show to pray while Jack lies in his hospital room comatose.

=== Peter ===
Kristopher Higgins portrays Peter, who is introduced in the Season 3 episode "Chicken Little". Peter becomes a love interest for Griffin when Grace sets them up believing Peter is gay. After talking with both his father and Griffin, Peter comes out as gay, and pursues a relationship with Griffin.

=== Mercedes ===
Katelyn Tarver portrays Mercedes, who is one of the friends of Dylan, Raven, and Wendy. Her first appearance was in Smokin' Like a Virgin, although she was probably at Dylan's party (before everyone ended up at the cabin next door, where Jesse and everyone else from the main cast was). She went over to Ben's house with Dylan and she smoked pot because she was depressed after her mother died and her mother had a prescription.
