= Fat Actress =

2005 American television series

- Kirstie Alley as herself on Fat Actress
- Created by: Kirstie Alley; Brenda Hampton
- Directed by: Keith Truesdell
- Starring: Kirstie Alley; Bryan Callen; Rachael Harris
- Country of origin: United States
- Original language: English
- No. of seasons: 1
- No. of episodes: 7

Production
- Running time: 30 minutes

Original release
- Network: Showtime
- Release: March 7 – April 18, 2005

Fat Actress is an American comedy television series starring Kirstie Alley. In the United States, it aired on Showtime from March 7 to April 18, 2005. The series was created and written by Alley and Brenda Hampton.

== Premise ==
Alley gave a glimpse of the humor and the irony in her battle to lose weight and get back on television in a tough business that prefers the svelte figures seen on the most successful actresses. The series was generally unscripted, with each episode emanating from a story outline and the actors largely improvising the dialogue. The storylines were drawn from a heightened perception of Alley's real-life experiences, and some of Alley's friends appeared as themselves in cameos to further blur the lines between truth and fiction.

== Cast and characters ==
=== Main ===
- Kirstie Alley as Kirstie Alley, a successful television and film star whose weight gain has become the subject of every tabloid imaginable, as well as the blight of her existence as she tries to find work and true love in an unforgiving Hollywood.
- Rachael Harris as Kevyn Shecket, Kirstie's live-in hair stylist. Unlike Eddie, she is more of a best friend to Kirstie.
- Bryan Callen as Eddie Falcone, Kirstie's personal assistant who lives in her garage. He himself is desperate for Hollywood work; at any chance he gets, he brings up a Hollywood film he did which is "taking film festivals by storm".

=== Recurring ===
- Michael McDonald as Sam Rascal, Kirstie's manager who disappoints her.
- Kelly Preston as Quinn Taylor Scout, a young and very famous Hollywood starlet. She is bulimic and helps Kirstie lose much weight as possible, with the craziest and most dangerous diets.

=== Celebrity cameos ===
- John Travolta
- Mayim Bialik
- Kid Rock
- Larry King
- Merv Griffin
- Rhea Perlman
- Jeff Zucker
- Carmen Electra
- Leah Remini
- Melissa Gilbert

== Production ==
Fat Actress was announced in July 2004, with plans to produce six episodes beginning in the fall. Harris and Callen were cast in September 2004. Filming took place in Los Angeles, California. Seven episodes were produced.

== Episodes ==
No.	Title	Directed by	Written by	Original release date
1	"Big Butts"	Keith Truesdell	Kirstie Alley & Brenda Hampton	March 7, 2005
Kirstie Alley is at the end of her rope. After years of being on top, with a hit show in Cheers & Veronica's Closet, she has hit rock bottom because she is now fat - almost 300 pounds according to tabloids. Kirstie, desperate to rekindle the fame she once had off of Star magazine, forces her agent to set a network meeting with Jeff Zucker for a project she has been thinking up. She finds out that he thinks she is too fat for TV. She flirts with an NBC exec and ends up with a Talent Holding Deal, so long as she loses a few pounds.
2	"Charlie's Angels"	Keith Truesdell	Kirstie Alley & Brenda Hampton	March 14, 2005
One of the rumors regarding Kirstie's weight gain is that she is having a kid---with Kid Rock! Elsewhere, she is on a mission to land a role in Charlie's Angels III. During the meeting with the director of Charlie's Angels she runs into the love of her life, Kid Rock, but develops a bad case of diarrhea from an overdose of laxatives. During this Eddie rams into Melissa Gilbert's car while ogling Carmen Electra.
3	"Holy Lesbo, Batman"	Keith Truesdell	Kirstie Alley & Brenda Hampton	March 21, 2005
Kirstie schemes to meet Gwen Stefani but her attempt to meet the No Doubt lead singer lands her in jail, where she reconnects with an ex-boyfriend who has a surprise for her.
4	"The Koi Effect"	Keith Truesdell	Kirstie Alley & Brenda Hampton	March 28, 2005
Kirstie tries a new diet theory and surrounds herself with small things.
5	"Crack for Good"	Keith Truesdell	Kirstie Alley & Brenda Hampton	April 4, 2005
Kirstie's crackhead brother arrives and suggests that Kirstie start doing crack in order to lose weight and her dysfunctional parents intervene.
6	"Cry Baby McGuire"	Keith Truesdell	Kirstie Alley & Brenda Hampton	April 11, 2005
Merv Griffin sets up Kirstie up with one of his rich friends. At first, Kirstie thinks he is ideal, but he turns out to be an emotional wreck.
7	"Hold This"	Keith Truesdell	Kirstie Alley & Brenda Hampton	April 18, 2005
Kirstie discovers her bank account is running low on funds. She schemes to get another lucrative deal from NBC. She soon sleeps with Jeff Zucker, gets the deal, and a show of her own.

== Broadcast ==
In the United States, Fat Actress premiered on Showtime on March 7, 2005. The series premiere gave the network its highest series ratings, a record that was not beaten until October 2006. Viewership dropped dramatically after the first two episodes aired.

The series aired on Movie Central in Western Canada, The Movie Network in Eastern Canada, FX in the UK, Network Ten in Australia and VOX, it aired on Fox Life in Italy and Das Vierte in Germany.

== Home media ==
A week after its premiere, Showtime announced plans to rush the series' DVD release in order to capitalize on an unusually high awareness of the program. The DVD was scheduled for release on May 24, 2005, rather than the usual six-to-nine-month waiting period for most Showtime shows. The series was added to iTunes in February 2006.

== Reception ==
Fat Actress received mixed reviews. Brian Lowry of Variety wrote a negative review, while Entertainment Weekly gave the series a "C−". Nathan Rabin deemed Fat Actress a "failure" in his "My World of Flops" column for The A.V. Club, saying "There is both laughter and poignancy to be gleaned from our culture’s obsession with thinness and cruelty towards those who come up short, but all Fat Actress is after is laughs, the cruder and cheaper the better."
