= Luke Zimmerman =

American actor (born 1980)

Luke Zimmerman (born September 11, 1980, in Evanston, Illinois, United States) is an American actor who is best known for his role as Tom Bowman on ABC Family's The Secret Life of the American Teenager. In 2012 Zimmerman won the Quincy Jones Exceptional Advocacy Award.

== Early life ==
Zimmerman was born with Down syndrome. He played Romeo in the play Romeo and Juliet and performed in the 1990 television movie drama Daughter of the Streets.

In 2007, Zimmerman tried out for the role of Tom Bowman, Grace Bowman's adopted older brother on The Secret Life of the American Teenager, which began airing in July 2008. He also appeared on Glee in November 2013.

== Personal life ==
Zimmerman was a student at Performing Arts Studio West.

== Filmography ==
Film
| Year | Title | Role | Notes |
|---|---|---|---|
| 1990 | Daughter of the Streets | Andrew | |

Television
| Year | Title | Role | Notes |
|---|---|---|---|
| 2008–2013 | The Secret Life of the American Teenager | Tom Bowman | |
| 2013 | Glee | Student | Episode: "Movin' Out" |
