= Daren Kagasoff =

American actor (born 1987)

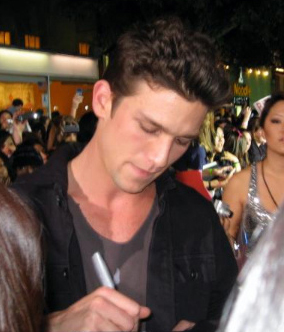
- Kagasoff as a guest at the Twilight premiere in 2008
- Born: Daren Maxwell Kagasoff; September 16, 1987 (age 37); Encino, Los Angeles, California, U.S.
- Occupation: Actor
- Years active: 2008–present

Daren Maxwell Kagasoff (KA-guh-sawf; born September 16, 1987) is an American actor. He is best known for starring as Ricky Underwood on the ABC Family teen drama series The Secret Life of the American Teenager from 2008 to 2013.

== Early life ==
Kagasoff was born in Encino, California, to Elise Kagasoff (née Levy) and Barry Kagasoff, a diamond merchant. He is the middle of three children; he has an older brother, Justin, and a younger sister, Natalie. Kagasoff is Jewish.

Kagasoff graduated from Montclair Preparatory High School in 2005 where he played on his school's baseball team. While attending school at San Francisco State University, Kagasoff decided to become an actor.

== Career ==
After deciding to return to Los Angeles, Kagasoff landed the lead role in a local theater production of Suburbia, a play that the eponymous 1996 film was based upon. After studying acting, he began auditioning for television and film roles. During one of his first auditions, he impressed producer Brenda Hampton so much that she hand-picked him to star as Ricky Underwood in the ABC Family series The Secret Life of the American Teenager. The show ran for five seasons.

It was announced on February 24, 2013, that Kagasoff had been cast as Alex in the Fox pilot Delirium, based on the novel by Lauren Oliver. However, the pilot was not picked up to series.

Kagasoff co-starred as Trevor in the supernatural horror film Ouija, directed by Stiles White and co-written by Juliet Snowden and White. The film was released in October 2014.

In September 2014, Kagasoff joined the cast of the Red Band Society, a comedy-drama series on Fox for the 2014–15 American television season developed by Margaret Nagle. He had a recurring role playing Kara's love interest, Hunter Cole. The series premiered on September 17, 2014, and was canceled after one season.

== Filmography ==
Television and film roles
Year	Title	Role	Notes
2008–2013	The Secret Life of the American Teenager	Ricky Underwood	Main role
2014	Ouija	Trevor	Film
2014	Blue	Daren	Web series; 2 episodes
2014	Delirium	Alex Sheathes	Unsold television pilot (FOX)
2014	Stalker	Eric Bates	Episode: Pilot
2014–2015	Red Band Society	Hunter Cole	Recurring role, 7 episodes
2015	Paradise Pictures	Wyatt Osborne	Unsold television pilot (USA)
2017	S.W.A.T.	Gordon	Episode: "Imposters"
2019	The Village	Gabe Napolitano	Main role
2022	Devotion	Bill Koenig	Main role
2024	Hanukah on the Rocks	Jay	Main role Hallmark TV Film

== Awards and nominations ==
Year	Award	Category	Work	Result
2009	Teen Choice Award	Choice TV Breakout Star: Male	The Secret Life of the American Teenager	Nominated
2009	Teen Choice Award	Choice Summer TV Star: Male	The Secret Life of the American Teenager	Won
2010	Teen Choice Award	Choice TV Actor: Drama	The Secret Life of the American Teenager	Nominated
2010	Teen Choice Award	Choice Summer TV Star: Male	The Secret Life of the American Teenager	Nominated
2011	Teen Choice Award	Choice TV Actor: Drama	The Secret Life of the American Teenager	Nominated
2012	Teen Choice Award	Choice Summer TV Star: Male	The Secret Life of the American Teenager	Nominated
