= Ken Baumann =

American actor (born 1989/90)

- Born: 1989 or 1990 (age 36–37)
- Other name: Kenny Baumann
- Occupations: Actor, writer, publisher, book designer
- Years active: 2003–2013
- Spouse: Aviva Baumann (m. 2012)

Ken Baumann (born 1989 or 1990) is a former American actor, writer, publisher, and book designer. He is known for playing Ben Boykewich on The Secret Life of the American Teenager. He is the author of numerous novels, nonfiction stories, essays, and poems. He also owns and co-owns Sator Press. He also co-founded the iOS app Sweetspot. In 2014, Baumann enrolled at St. John's College in Santa Fe, New Mexico.

== Personal life ==
Baumann married actress Aviva Farber on June 16, 2012, in Malibu, California. He has Crohn's disease.

== Book design ==
Baumann served as the series designer for the Boss Fight Books. He also designed the covers for Fuckscapes by Sean Kilpatrick, and the issues of No Colony, Sator Press.

== Published works ==
=== Novels ===
- The Country (2019) ISBN 978-1091807549
- Solip (New York: Tyrant Books 2013) ISBN 978-0985023546
- Say, Cut, Map (2013) ISBN 978-1497651913

=== Nonfiction ===
- Eat the Flowers (2018)
- EarthBound (2014) ISBN 978-1940535005

== Filmography ==
Film roles
Year	Title	Role	Notes
2003	Riding the 9	Scott	Short film; as Kenny Baumann
2004	Consideration	Albert	Short film; as Kenny Baumann
2004	Birdie & Bogey	Party Boy	as Kenny Baumann
2005	Falling	Little Jimmy	Short film; as Kenny Baumann
2006	Wolves in the Woods	Peter	as Kenny Baumann
2008	Whore	Kenny	as Kenny Baumann
2009	Here's Herbie	Mike	Short film
2012	The Cottage	Justin	
2012	We Speak	Ken	Short film

Television roles
Year	Title	Role	Notes
2005	Don't Ask	Calvin Collins	Television film; as Kenny Baumann
2006	Sixty Minute Man	Michael Hendersen	Television film; as Kenny Baumann
2006	The Other Mall	Trevor	Television film; as Kenny Baumann
2008	Eli Stone	Peter Johnson	1 episode
2008–2013	The Secret Life of the American Teenager	Ben Boykewich	Main role; 121 episodes
2010–2011	Castle	Ashley	3 episodes
2013	Call Me Crazy: A Five Film	Luke	Television film
