= Keith Truesdell =

American television director

- Occupations: Television director and producer
- Years active: 1989–present

Keith Truesdell is an American television director and producer. He is best known for directing a number of stand-up comedy television specials for the likes Chris Rock, Adam Sandler, Kathy Griffin, Janeane Garofalo, Joan Rivers and others as well as episodic television series. He is co-owner of Production Partners, Inc. a Los Angeles based television production company.

He has received two Primetime Emmy Award nominations for directing Chris Rock: Bigger & Blacker in 2000 and Kathy Griffin: Straight to Hell in 2008.

His other television credits include With Bob and David, Curb Your Enthusiasm, All That, Kenan & Kel, Grounded for Life, The Tracy Morgan Show, The Bernie Mac Show, Everybody Hates Chris, My Boys, Girlfriends, Jimmy Kimmel Live, Real Time with Bill Maher, 7th Heaven, Fat Actress, The Secret Life of the American Teenager.
