= Brenda Hampton =

American screenwriter

- Born: August 19, 1951 (age 74); Atlanta, Georgia, U.S.
- Occupations: Television producer and writer
- Notable work: 7th Heaven; Fat Actress; The Secret Life of the American Teenager

Brenda Hampton (born August 19, 1951) is an American television producer, screenwriter. She created, wrote and produced the television shows 7th Heaven, Fat Actress, and The Secret Life of the American Teenager.

== Biography ==
Hampton grew up in Atlanta, Georgia. Her father was an electrical engineer for AT&T and a television repairman. She studied journalism at the University of Georgia, graduating in 1973. After finishing her university studies, she worked as a technical writer for the U.S. Navy, wrote speeches, technical manuals and corporate newsletters. In the 1980s, she moved to Los Angeles and began writing for Sister Kate, an American situation comedy which aired on the NBC television network in 1989 and lasted one season. After Sister Kate finished, she worked as a story editor on the CBS television comedy, Baghdad Café, featuring Whoopi Goldberg. Hampton has worked on a number of television programs including the CBS sitcom Lenny, the NBC comedy-drama Blossom, and the NBC comedy Mad About You. In 1994 she worked with David Landsberg to develop and executive produce the CBS series Daddy's Girls, featuring Dudley Moore and Keri Russell in her first main television role.

Hampton has three adopted children.

Hampton created, wrote and executive produced the drama series 7th Heaven, which lasted 11 seasons and was nominated for and won a range of awards, including, numerous Young Artist, and Teen Choice Awards and an Emmy nomination.

In 2008, Hampton's new television show, The Secret Life of the American Teenager was released. The show, created, executive produced and written by Hampton, is filmed in Los Angeles by Hampton's production company, Brendavision. It is a youth-oriented drama series, aired on the ABC Family network. When The Secret Life of the American Teenager premiered, it became ABC Family's most-watched series premiere.

== Awards ==
On February 10, 2010, Hampton accepted the Francis M. Wheat Community Service Award for her work as a child advocate, and for her work on The Secret Life of the American Teenager.

== Select television credits ==
- The Secret Life of the American Teenager
- Fat Actress
- Safe Harbor
- 7th Heaven
- The John Larroquette Show
- Blossom
- Mad About You
