= Frederick Hotel =

Frederick Hotel may refer to:

- Cosmopolitan Hotel Tribeca, also known as the Frederick Hotel, in New York City
- Frederick Building, also known as the Frederick Hotel, in Huntington, West Virginia
- Frederick Hotel (Loup City, Nebraska), a historic building

== See also ==
- Frederick Gordon (hotelier) (1835–1094), British entrepreneur and chairman of Frederick Hotels Company Limited
