= Cosmopolitan Hotel =

Cosmopolitan Hotel may refer to:

- Cosmopolitan Hotel Tribeca in Tribeca, New York City
- Cosmopolitan of Las Vegas ("The Cosmo"), a resort casino and hotel in Paradise, Nevada
- Cosmopolitan Hotel and Restaurant in Old Town San Diego, California
- Dorsett Wanchai Hong Kong Hotel (formerly Cosmopolitan Hotel Hong Kong), a Hong Kong hotel

== See also ==
- Cosmopolitan (disambiguation)
