= Brad Friedmutter =

American architect

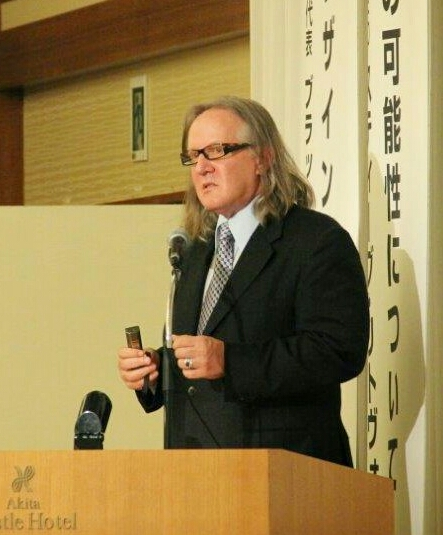
- Born: Brooklyn, New York
- Occupation: Architect

Brad Henry Friedmutter, A.I.A. is an architect and founder of Friedmutter Group, a design, architecture, master planning and interior design firm. Friedmutter Group has designed dozens of integrated resorts including The Cosmopolitan of Las Vegas, the fifth-most expensive building in the world. Friedmutter is a registered architect in 43 states. Friedmutter Group has offices in Las Vegas, Nevada, Newport Beach, California, and Macau, China.

== Early life ==
Brad Friedmutter was born in Brooklyn, New York and raised in Flushing, Queens. His mother was a school teacher in the arts and later the Director of Cultural Arts for the Board of Education under Mayor Ed Koch. His father collected and restored early 1900s antiques.

He received a Bachelor's Degree in Architecture from Cooper Union in 1973.

== Career ==
From 1978-1981 Friedmutter was a project manager for Conversano and Associates, a casino design firm. In 1981 he became Vice President of Design and Construction for Steve Wynn's Atlandia Design. In 1987 he took a similar position with Bally's Las Vegas, but in 1991, Bally's went bankrupt and he was laid off. In 1992 he founded Friedmutter Group.

From 2004-2010 Friedmutter Group was the executive architect and casino interiors for The Cosmopolitan of Las Vegas which was to be the most expensive building in the United States. The Cosmopolitan eventual budget of $3.9 billion placed it as the fifth most expensive building in the world by the time of its opening in 2010.

Friedmutter Group was the design architect, interior architecture and interior design including mass gaming casino, lobbies, low-rise entry facade and casino restaurants for Studio City Macau a $3.2 billion resort hotel and casino, notable for its collaboration with Brett Ratner, Martin Scorsese, Brad Pitt, Leonardo DiCaprio, Robert De Niro, James Packer, Mariah Carey in October 2015.

Friedmutter Group's other notable projects include the Green Valley Ranch in Las Vegas, the Bally's Casino Tunica in Tunica, Mississippi, the Red Rock in Las Vegas, the Horseshoe Casinos in Cleveland and Cincinnati, Ohio, and the Trump Plaza in Atlantic City, New Jersey.

== List of Projects ==
=== 2020 Projects ===
- Sahara Las Vegas, Las Vegas, NV Poker Room (D, ID)

=== 2019 Projects ===
- Palms Casino Resort, Las Vegas, NV Renovation and Rebranding (D, ID)
- Soboba Tribal Casino, Hemet, CA (MP, A, D, ID)
- Caesars Palace Forum Meeting Rooms, (Spring 2020) Las Vegas, NV (MP, A, D)
- Mount Airy Casino Resort, Mt Pocono, PA expansion and renovation (MP, A, D, ID)
- Harrah's Atlantic City, NJ Sportsbook (ID)
- Hard Rock Sacramento Fire Mountain, CA (Fall 2019) (MP, A, D, ID)
- The Strat (Formally Stratosphere) Las Vegas, NV renovation and rebranding (MP, A, D, ID)

=== 2018 Projects ===
- MGM Springfield Hotel and Casino, Springfield, MA (MP, A, D, ID)
- Palace Station, Las Vegas, NV Expansion, and Renovation (MP, A, D, ID)
- Spokane Casino, Spokane, WA (MP, A, D, ID)
- Lone Butte Casino, Chandler, AZ Renovations (A, ID)
- Vee Quiva Casino Resort, Laveen, AZ Renovations (A, ID)
- MGM Cotai (Cotai, Macau) Public Space (ID)

=== 2017 Projects ===
- Del Lago Resort and Casino, Tyre, NY (MP, A, D, ID)
- Ilani Casino Resort, Ridgefield, Washington (MP, A, D, ID)
- Gunlake Casino Expansion, Wayland, MI (MP, A, D, ID)
- Kansas Crossing Interior Design, Pittsburg, KS (MP, ID)
- Orleans Casino Resort Buffet Las Vegas, NV (A, ID)
- Coconut Creek BOL Noodle Bar, Coconut Creek FL (A, ID)

=== 2016 Projects ===
- Graton Resort & Casino, Rohnert Park, CA Hotel Tower Expansion (MP, A, D, ID)
- MGM Cotai (ID)
- Harrah's Resort Southern California, Resort Expansion (MP, A, D, ID)
- Green Valley Ranch Renovation, Henderson, NV (A, ID)

=== 2015 Projects ===
- Studio City Macau, Cotai, Macau (D, ID)
- The Star, Sydney, Australia (ID)
- Hard Rock Hotel and Casino, Center Bar Las Vegas, NV (A, D, ID)
- Davidoff of Geneva, Las Vegas, NV (A, D, ID)

=== 2014 Projects ===
- Hard Rock Sioux City, Sioux City, IA (MP, A, D, ID)
- Horseshoe Casino Baltimore, Baltimore, MD (MP, A, D, ID)
- Graton Resort & Casino, Rohnert Park, CA (MP, A, D, ID)
- Harrah's Resort Southern California, Valley Center, CA (MP ph 2, A, D, ID)

=== 2013 Projects ===
- Horseshoe Casino Cincinnati, Cincinnati, OH (MP, A, D, ID)
- Twin Arrows Casino Resort, Flagstaff, AZ (MP, A, D, ID)
- Vee Quiva Casino, Chandler, AZ (MP, A, D, ID)

=== 2012 Projects ===
- Horseshoe Casino Cleveland, Cleveland, OH (MP, A, D, ID)
- Northern Edge Casino, Upper Fruitland, NM (MP, A, D, ID)
- Harrah's Rincon Casino Resort, Valley Center, CA, on-going Renovation & Expansion, 2010, 2012 (A, ID)

=== 2011 ===
- Gun Lake Resort Casino, Bradley, MI (MP, A, D, ID)
- Seminole Casino, Coconut Creek, FL, on-going Renovations & Expansions (ID)
- El Cortez Casino, Las Vegas, NV, Renovations (ID)
- Tropicana Las Vegas, Las Vegas, NV, Expansions (ID)
- Hard Rock Café Las Vegas, Las Vegas, NV, Renovations (ID)
- Harrah's Atlantic City, Atlantic City, NJ, Restaurant Expansions (ID)

=== 2010 ===
- The Cosmopolitan of Las Vegas, Las Vegas, Nevada (MP, A, D, ID)
- Hard Rock Punta Cana Resort, Macao Beach, Dominican Republic, Expansion & Renovation (A, ID)
- Sunset Station Expansion, Las Vegas, NV, Renovation (A, ID)
- Star City Casino, Sydney, Australia, Renovation & Expansion (A, ID)
- Harrah's Las Vegas, Las Vegas, NV, Restaurant Renovations (A, ID)

=== 2009 ===
- Quechan Casino Resort, Yuma, AZ (MP, A, D, ID)
- Parx Casino, Bensalem, PA (MP, A, D, ID)
- Palace Station, Las Vegas, NV, Renovations & Expansions, 1997, 2005, 2009 (A, ID)
- Bally's Claridge Casino/Bally's Park Place, Atlantic City, NJ, Renovation & Expansion, 2005, 2009 (A, ID)
- Empress Joliet Resort & Casino, Joliet, IL, Expansion & Renovation
- Seminole Casino Immokalee, Immokalee, FL, Expansion (ID)
- Boulder Station, Las Vegas, NV, Expansion (A, ID)

=== 2008 ===
- Horseshoe Casino, Hammond, IN (MP, A, D, ID)
- Dover Downs Hotel & Casino, Dover, DE
- Harrah's Resort, Atlantic City, NJ, Bayview Tower, 2002, Waterfront Tower, 2008 (MP, A, D)
- Trump Taj Mahal, Atlantic City, NJ, Chairman's Tower (MP, A, D)
- Aliante Station Casino Hotel, Las Vegas, NV (MP, D, ID)
- Charlestown Races, Charlestown, WV, Renovation & Expansion
- Horseshoe Southern Indiana, Elizabeth, IN
- Foxwoods Resort Casino, Ledyard, CT, Renovation (ID)

=== 2007 ===
- Green Valley Ranch Resort, Las Vegas, NV, PH 1, 2001; PH 2, 2004; PH 3, 2007, ongoing (MP, A, D, ID)
- Island View Casino Resort Hotel, Gulfport, MS, Expansion & Renovation, Phase 1, 2006; Phase 2, 2007
- Miracle Mile at Planet Hollywood, Las Vegas, NV, Retail Renovation
- Dennis Hotel, Atlantic City, NJ, Historic Preservation & Renovation
- Sky City Resort, Auckland New Zealand

=== 2006 ===
- Red Rock Casino Resort & Spa, Las Vegas, NV (MP, A, D, ID)
- Horseshoe Council Bluffs, Council Bluffs, IA, 2006 (MP, A, D, ID)
- Harrah's Joliet Resort & Casino, Joliet, IL, Expansion & Renovation
- Spirit Mountain, Williamina, OR, Hotel Tower Expansion
- Empress Joliet Casino, Joliet, IL, Renovations

=== 2005 ===
- IP Hotel Resort Casino, Biloxi, MS, post-Katrina Renovation (A, ID)
- Isle of Capri Casino, Biloxi, MS, post-Katrina Renovation (A, ID)
- Bally's Wild Wild West Casino, Atlantic City, NJ, Renovation & Expansion
- Fiesta Henderson Casino, Henderson, NV, Renovations (D, ID)

=== 2004 ===
- Cache Creek Casino Hotel Resort, Brooks, CA (MP, A, D, ID)
- Ritz Carlton Lake Las Vegas, Henderson, NV (A, ID)
- Showboat Casino & Hotel, Atlantic City, NJ, Orleans Tower Expansion, 2003; House of Blues (A, D, ID)
- Fiesta Rancho Casino, Las Vegas, NV, Renovations & Ice Rink (D, ID)
- Casino De’Venezia, Venice, Italy, Renovation & Expansion (ID)
- Isle of Capri Coventry, Coventry, United Kingdom, Expansion (ID)
- The Isle at Hull, Hull, United Kingdom, Expansion (ID)

=== 2003 ===
- Pala Casino Resort, Pala, CA (MP, D, ID)
- Thunder Valley Casino Resort, Lincoln, CA (MP, D, ID)

=== 2002 ===
- Texas Station, Las Vegas, NV, Renovations & Expansions, 2000, 2002 (A, ID)

=== 1999 ===
- Dancing Eagle Casino, Albuquerque, NM

=== 1998 ===
- Seven Feather Hotel & Casino Resort, Canyonville, OR
- Resorts International, Atlantic City, NJ, Renovations & Expansions

=== 1997 ===
- Horseshoe Casino Hotel, Tunica, MS
- Horseshoe Casino Bossier, Bossier City, LA
- Presidents Casino, Biloxi, MS, Renovations
- Presidents Casino, St. Louis, MO, Renovations

=== 1995 ===
- Flamingo Hilton, Las Vegas, NV, Exterior Façade Renovation

=== 1994 ===
- Bally's Las Vegas Casino, Las Vegas, NV, Renovation & New Exterior Plaza & Porte Cochere
- Sheraton Casino and Hotel Tunica, Tunica, MS

MP – Friedmutter Group Master Planning
A – Friedmutter Group Executive Architect
D – Friedmutter Group – Design Architect
ID – Friedmutter Group – Interior Design

== Awards ==
=== 2015 Awards ===
- The Hard Rock Sioux City Hotel & Casino was awarded "Best Hotel at the 2015 Annual HOSPY Awards
- 14Forty at the Horseshoe Casino Baltimore was awarded 2015 Annual HOSPY Awards "Best Nightclub or Lounge"
- The Hard Rock Sioux City Hotel & Casino was awarded "Best Hotel" Lobby/Registration at the 2015 Annual HOSPY Awards
- The Hard Rock Sioux City Hotel & Casino was awarded 2015 "AAA Four Diamond Award"

=== 2014 Awards ===
- The Vee Quiva Hotel & Casino was awarded "Best Hospitality Project" at the 2014 Real Estate & Development RED Awards
- The Vee Quiva Hotel & Casino was awarded 2014 "AAA Four Diamond Award"

=== 2013 Awards ===
- The Spread at Horseshoe Cincinnati Casino was awarded the "Best Buffet" at the 2013 G2E Casino Design Awards
- The Diamond Lounge at the Horseshoe Cleveland Casino was awarded "Best Lounge/Bar" at the 2013 G2E Casino Design Awards
- The Twin Arrows Navajo Casino Resort was awarded "Best Native American Casino Facility" at the 2013 G2E Casino Design Awards

=== 2012 Awards ===
- The Bond Bar at The Cosmopolitan of Las Vegas was awarded "Best Nightclub or Lounge" at the Best Nightclub or Lounge at the 2012 Annual HOSPY Awards

=== 2011 Awards ===
- The Cosmopolitan of Las Vegas was awarded "Fodor’s 100" at the Top 100 Hotel Awards
- The Marquee DayClub Pool at The Cosmopolitan was awarded "Best Resort Pool" at the 2011 Annual NEWH HOSPY Awards
- The Cosmopolitan of Las Vegas was awarded "Best Convention/Ballroom" at the 2011 Annual NEWH HOSPY Awards
- The Wicked Spoon at The Cosmopolitan was awarded "Best Buffet" at the 2011 Annual NEWH HOSPY Awards
- The Cosmopolitan of Las Vegas was awarded the "Best Parking Garage" 2011 Best of Las Vegas
- The Cosmopolitan of Las Vegas was awarded the "Best Hotel" 2011 Best of Las Vegas
- The Red Rock Lanes Bowling Center was awarded "Best Bowling" 2011 Best of Las Vegas
- Awarded the 2011 "Silver Medallion Society" by the UNLV Foundation

=== 2010 Awards ===
- In 2010 the Friedmutter Group "Parx Casino" was awarded the 2010 "Excellence in Craftsmanship Award"
- In 2010 the Friedmutter Group "Parx Casino" was awarded the 2010 "Pro-AV Spotlight Award"
- In 2010 the Friedmutter Group was awarded the 2010 "Hard Rock Development Partner of the Year Award"
- In 2010 The Cosmopolitan of Las Vegas was awarded 2010 "Lodging Hospitality Design Award"

=== 2009-2010 Awards ===
- The Cosmopolitan of Las Vegas was awarded "Best Architectural Design over $250 Million for Casino Resort" at the 2009-2010 G2E Casino Design Awards
- The Cosmopolitan of Las Vegas was awarded "Best Overall Interior Design for Casino Resort" at the 2009-2010 G2E Casino Design Awards
- The Bond Bar at The Cosmopolitan of Las Vegas was awarded "Best Interior Design for a Resort Restaurant or Nightclub" at the 2009-2010 G2E Casino Design Awards
- The Pool District at The Cosmopolitan of Las Vegas was awarded "Best Interior Design for a Resort excluding Restaurant or Nightclub" at the 2009-2010 G2E Casino Design Awards

=== 2009 Awards ===
- Brad Friedmutter, AIA was awarded "Hospitality Industry Lifetime Achievement Award" at the 2009 Hospitality Design Platinum Circle Awards
- Harrah's Resort – Atlantic City/Friedmutter Group was awarded "Outstanding Achievement in Technology Integration" at the 2009 Archi-Tech AV Award

=== 2008 Awards ===
- The Hachi at Red Rock Casino Resort & Spa/Friedmutter Group was awarded "Best Interior Design for a Casino Resort, Restaurant or Nightclub" at the 2008 Casino Design Awards
- The Friedmutter Group was awarded the "Three Square 'Extra Helping' Award" For architectural design and going above & beyond the call of duty in the fight to end hunger at the 2008 Annual HOSPY Awards
- The Hachi at Red Rock Casino Resort & Spa/Friedmutter Group was awarded "Best Fine Dining Restaurant" at the 2008 Annual HOSPY Awards
- Brad Friedmutter, AIA was awarded "Hospitality Industry Lifetime Achievement Award" at the Annual HOSPY Awards

=== 2007 Awards ===
- The "Senses" Spa & Salon IP Resort & Casino/Friedmutter Group was awarded "Best Spa" 2007 Las Vegas NEWH HOSPY Award
- Brad Friedmutter was awarded the "Sarno Lifetime Achievement Award" for Casino Design
- The Friedmutter Group was awarded "Special Recognition in Design Excellence" at the 2007 Las Vegas NEWH HOSPY Awards
- The Grand Villa Suite - Red Rock Resort/Friedmutter Group was awarded "Best Suite" at the 2007 Las Vegas NEWH HOSPY Awards
- The T-Bones Chophouse – Red Rock Casino Resort/Friedmutter Group was awarded "Best Interior Design for a Casino/Resort. Retail Facility, Restaurant, Nightclub or Spa" at the 2007 Casino Design Awards
- The Red Rock Casino Resort & Spa/Friedmutter Group was awarded "Best Interior Design for a Casino/Resort" at the 2007 Casino Design Awards
- The Red Rock Casino Resort & Spa/Friedmutter Group was awarded the "Architectural Design Company of the Year for a Casino/Resort" at the 2007 Casino Design Awards
- The Red Rock Casino Resort & Spa/Friedmutter Group was awarded "Best Architectural Design for a Casino/Resort Over $200 Million" at the 2007 Casino Design Awards
- The Hachi Restaurant at Red Rock Interior/T.I. received the "Best of 2007 Nevada Award Southwest Contractor for Project Over $5 million" at the 2007 Nevada Award
- Brad Friedmutter was 2007 Vegas Dozen Men of the Year

=== 2006 Awards ===
- The Red Rock Casino Hotel & Spa was awarded "Best Ballroom & Convention" at the 2006 Annual HOSPY Awards
- The Red Rock Casino Hotel & Spa/Friedmutter Group was awarded "Best Casual Restaurant" at the 2006 Annual HOSPY Awards
- The Red Rock Casino Hotel & Spa/Friedmutter Group was awarded "Best Lobby" at the 2006 Annual HOSPY Awards
- The Red Rock Casino Hotel & Spa/Friedmutter Group was awarded "Best High End Restaurant" at the 2006 Annual HOSPY Awards
- The Red Rock Casino Hotel & Spa was awarded "Best Casino" at the 2006 Annual HOSPY Awards
- The Red Rock Casino Hotel & Spa/Friedmutter Group was awarded "Best Mid-Size Hotel" at the Annual HOSPY Awards
- The Friedmutter Group was awarded "Professional Firm of the Year" by the Las Vegas CSI Construction
- The Imperial Palace Penthouse Suites/Friedmutter Group was awarded "Excellence in Construction – Interior Finishes Award" by the Mississippi Associated Builders & Contractors
- The Friedmutter Group was awarded "Excellence in Construction Award-Commercial General Construction over 15 million-IP Hotel/Hurricane Restoration & Additions" by the Mississippi Associated Builders & Contractors
- The Red Rock Casino Resort Spa Phase I was awarded "Best Private Project over $5 million & Interior Project over $5 million" by Southwest Contractor McGraw Hill Construction
- The Friedmutter Group received a Certificate of Appreciation from AIA Las Vegas Chapter
- The Red Rock Resort Casino Spa was awarded "Best New Hotel Casino" by Best of Las Vegas Las Vegas Life

=== 2005 Awards ===
- The Red Rock Resort Casino Spa was awarded "Best of 2006 Best New construction project" Southwest Contractors
- The Southwest Masonry Thiriot Primary School Las Vegas, Nevada received an "Outstanding Masonry Projects"
- Shanghai Fat's Thunder Valley/Friedmutter Group received a "Best Interior Design for a Casino/ Resort-Restaurant/Nightclub" at the 2005 Casino Design Awards

=== 2004 Awards ===
- The Thunder Valley Resort/Friedmutter Group was "awarded Best Nightclub" at the 2004 HOSPY Awards
- The Cache Creek Casino was awarded "Best Suite" at the 2004 HOSPY Awards
- The Jewish Community Center of Atlantic County received a Recognition Award for The Milton & Betty Katz
- The Showboat Premier Lite Tower was awarded "Merit Award Cast-in-Place" at the 4th Annual New Jersey Concrete Awards 2004 New Jersey Chapter of the American Concrete & Aggregate Association
- The Warsaw Ghetto Remembrance Garden was awarded "Best Public Art" by Best of Las Vegas
- The Friedmutter Group received an Appreciation & Support Recognition Award from the National Indian Gaming Association

=== 2003 Awards ===
- The Sushi + Sake, Green Valley Ranch Resort was awarded the "Best Design Restaurant/Nightclub" at the 2003 1st Annual Sarno Awards/ Casino Design
- The Green Valley Ranch Resort was awarded "Best Architectural Design $100 million-$250 million" at the 2003 1st Annual Sarno Awards/ Casino Awards
- Harrah's Tower & Lobby Expansion won the "Award for Engineering Excellence" by the Consulting Engineers Council of New Jersey

== Personal life ==
Brad married actress and model Kimberly Friedmutter (née Stevens) on October 23, 2010. Together they designed and reside in their Las Vegas estate, Shangri-Las Vegas.
