= Ilani Casino Resort =

Indian casino complex in Clark County, Washington

ilani Casino Resort

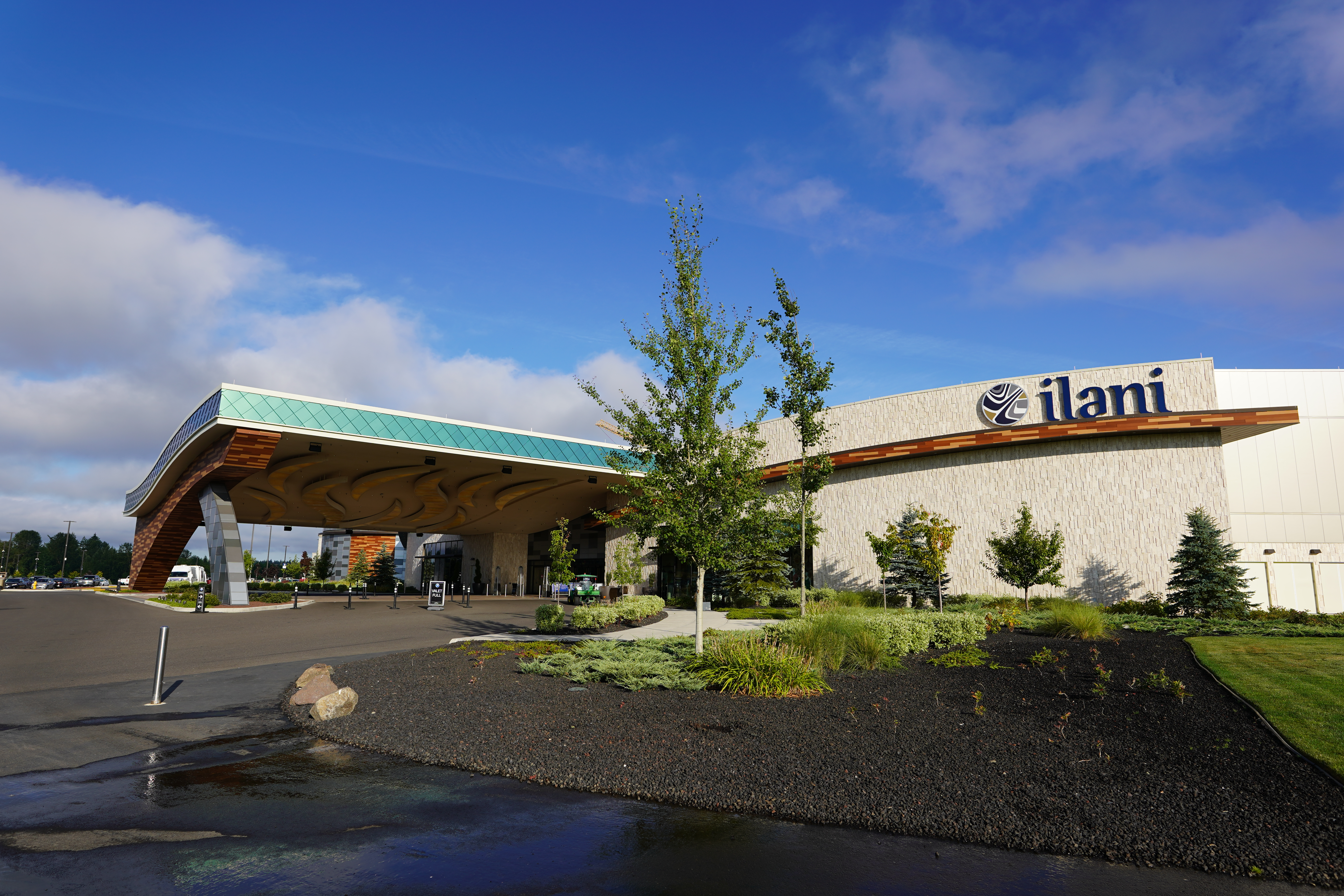

- Location within Washington (state)
- Interactive map of ilani Casino Resort
- Location: 1 Cowlitz Way Ridgefield, Washington; 45°51′12.1″N 122°42′26.2″W
- Opened: April 24, 2017
- Casino type: Indian
- Owner: Cowlitz Indian Tribe
- Architect: Friedmutter Group
- Website: ilaniresort.com

The ilani Casino Resort (/eɪˈlæneɪ/ ay-LAN-ay) is a casino operated by the Cowlitz Indian Tribe and located near La Center, Washington. The casino opened on April 24, 2017, after a lengthy legal battle over the tribe's right to establish a reservation on which to build the casino.

== History ==
The Cowlitz Indian Tribe was formally recognized by the U.S. federal government on February 14, 2000, consisting of 3,700 members but lacking an Indian reservation. In the 2000s, the newly recognized Cowlitz Tribe began planning for a casino and hotel complex on trust lands near La Center to bring in revenue.

The Cowlitz Tribe were granted a gambling license by the National Indian Gaming Commission in 2005. In 2013, the Cowlitz Tribe were granted the rights to establish a 152-acre (62 ha) reservation near La Center along Interstate 5, which would be home to a casino pending local approval. The reservation was formally established in March 2015, allowing for construction to begin after the resolution of an ongoing lawsuit in federal courts.

In December 2015, the Cowlitz Tribe announced that it had entered into a financing agreement with the Mohegan Tribe of Connecticut, owners of the Mohegan Sun mega-casino, to fund the project's $510 million cost. Members of the Cowlitz tribe broke ground on the casino on February 14, 2016, along with local politicians and representatives from the Mohegan Tribe. The casino was named "Ilani" in June 2016, using the Cowlitz word for "sing". The Cowlitz Tribe later took sole management of the casino in 2023.

=== Opening and expansion ===
The casino opened on April 24, 2017, filling its 3,000-stall parking lot and causing a 8-mile-long (13 km) traffic jam on Interstate 5 reaching Vancouver. An estimated 15,000 people attended the casino's opening day. The casino expanded its dining options and opened a new ballroom and business meeting center in 2018. A convenience store and gas station opened at Cowlitz Crossing near the casino site in 2019.

As part of the casino's construction, a freeway interchange on Interstate 5 was reconstructed at a cost of $32 million. The Cowlitz Tribe closed the casino in March 2020 due to the COVID-19 pandemic; the tribe reopened the casino in May and later banned indoor smoking as part of updated health measures. A parking garage with 2,700 stalls opened in February 2021; it is designed with future expansion and includes a rooftop event space.

Construction on Ilani's first major expansion, comprising a 14-story hotel, two restaurants, and additional gaming space, began in late 2020. The hotel opened in April 2023 with 289 rooms. A second expansion with 10,000 square feet (930 m^{2}) of additional convention space began in 2023 and is scheduled to be completed in 2024.

=== Controversy and lawsuit ===
The Ilani Casino Resort was built near the town of La Center, which had relied heavily on gambling taxes since the late 1980s. The owners of the four casinos in La Center were opposed to the Cowlitz Tribe's proposal to build a competing casino, also arguing that the new casino and reservation was too far from the tribe's historic lands near modern-day Kelso. One of the three remaining La Center cardrooms, the 25-year-old New Phoenix, closed a month before the Ilani opened, citing reduced sales, lost staff and traffic impacts from highway construction associated with the casino's construction. The Confederated Tribes of the Grand Ronde, owners of the Spirit Mountain Casino near Salem, Oregon, also opposed the construction of the casino over fears of an estimated $100 million in lost revenue.

On January 31, 2011, shortly after the Bureau of Indian Affairs approved the Cowlitz Tribe's application for the land trust, a lawsuit was filed in the U.S. District Court in Washington, D.C. to appeal the decision. The lawsuit concerned the 2009 ruling by the U.S. Supreme Court in Carcieri v. Salazar that forbid the federal government from taking land into trust for tribes recognized after the passage of the Indian Reorganization Act in 1934. The plaintiffs in the lawsuit included the City of Vancouver, Clark County, the owners of the La Center cardrooms, local landowners, and a group known as "Citizens Against Reservation Shopping". A separate lawsuit was filed on February 1, 2011, by the Confederated Tribes of Grand Ronde, arguing that the aboriginal and modern territory of the Cowlitz was further north, while the Grand Ronde had stronger connections to the Clark County region.

U.S. District Court judge Barbara J. Rothstein ruled in the Cowlitz Tribe's favor on December 11, 2014, upholding the rights for the tribe to establish a reservation and build a casino. Rothstein ruled that the U.S. Secretary of the Interior had the authority to take land into trust for the Cowlitz Tribe, citing the phrasing of the 2009 Carcieri decision that did not include the word "recognized".

An appeal was filed by the plaintiffs, but the ruling was affirmed by the U.S. Court of Appeals in July 2016. Vancouver and Clark County immediately ended their involvement in the lawsuit, followed by the Grand Ronde in October, leaving Citizens Against Reservation Shopping and the La Center casinos as the remaining litigants in their appeal. The U.S. Supreme Court declined to hear the appeal in early April 2017, ending the legal battle over the Ilani Casino Resort shortly before its scheduled opening.

== Facilities ==
The 368,000-square-foot (34,200 m^{2}), $510 million Ilani Casino Resort is located on Interstate 5, approximately 25 miles (40 km) north of Portland, Oregon. It has 2,500 slot machines, 75 table games, a 2,500-seat performance venue, and several bars and stores. It is projected to attract 4.5 million visitors annually and bring $200 million to the Cowlitz Tribe. The casino opened with 15 restaurants, including a 300-seat Michael Jordan's Steakhouse. A 30,000 square feet (2,800 m^{2}) events center opened in April 2018, with the ability to host conventions, trade shows, and concerts.

The casino's architect and interior designer is Friedmutter Group, a Las Vegas-based firm specializing in gambling projects. Ilani is expected to employ 800 to 1,200 people. A new tribal administration office, smoke shop, and gas station will also be built adjacent to the resort.
