= Michael Jordan's Steak House =

American restaurant group

Michael Jordan
- Type: Private
- Industry: Fine dining
- Founded: 1997
- Products: Steaks
- Website: www.michaeljordansteakhouse.com

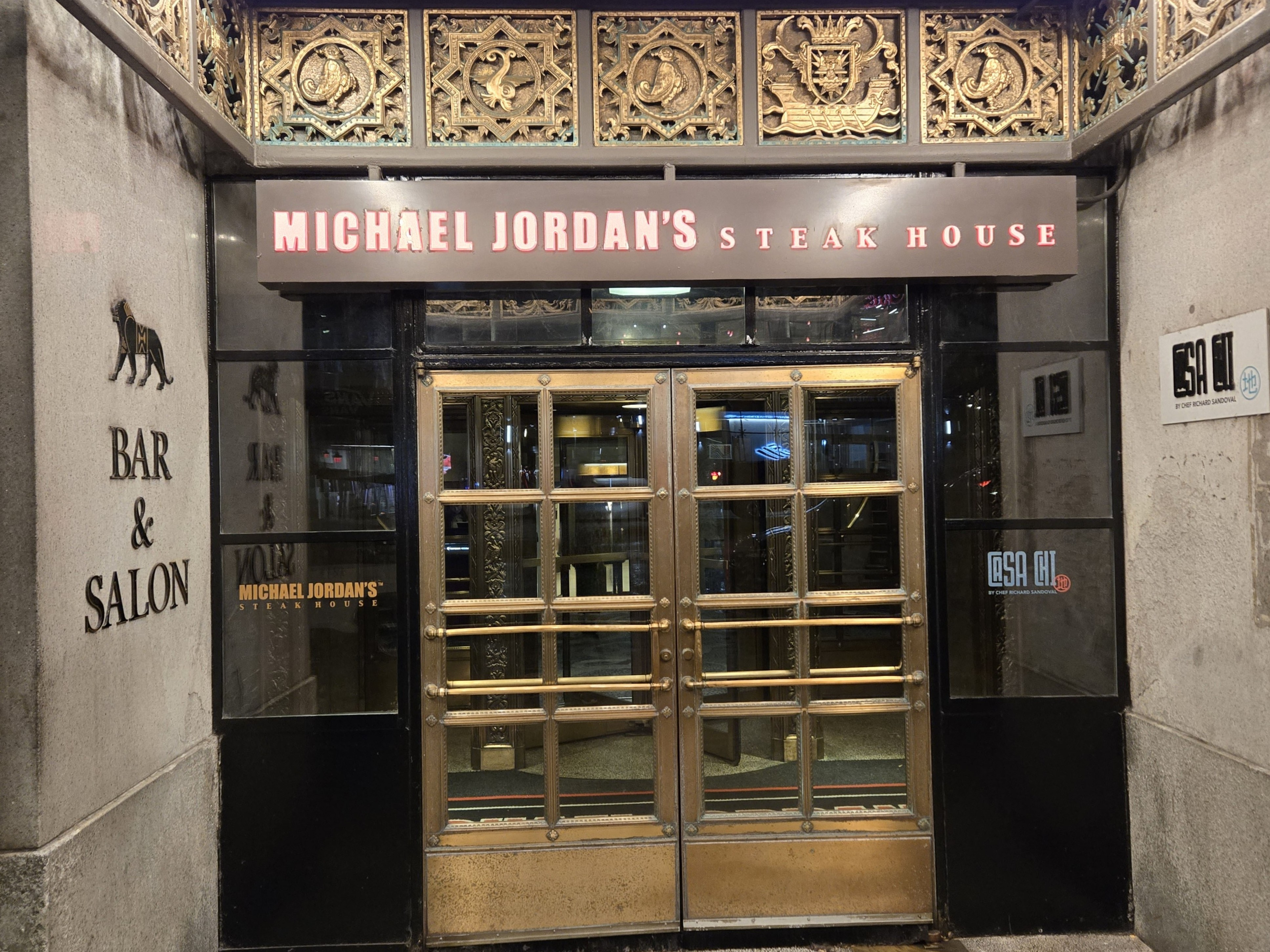
Michael Jordan's Steak House, Chicago

Michael Jordan's Steak House, founded by retired American basketball player Michael Jordan, is a fine-dining restaurant group. The main location was in Grand Central Terminal, New York City, though locations exist in Uncasville, Connecticut; Ridgefield, Washington; and Chicago.

== Products ==
The company has a line of USDA Prime Steaks, sauces, condiments, grillware and collectibles, under the Michael Jordan Steaks brand. The steaks can be ordered on their website and shipped directly to customers nationwide.

== Design ==
Designed by David Rockwell, the restaurant group is run by the Glazier family, a couple who own multiple food establishments. The Grand Central location occupied a 7,000-square-foot (650 m^{2}) space, seating 210. The restaurant has no sports memorabilia, but instead focuses on "Michael Jordan the businessman."

== History ==
In 2010, its parent company filed for Chapter 11 bankruptcy protection after failing to make an agreement with its lenders.

== Locations ==
- Grand Central Terminal, New York City, New York (closed in December 2018)
- Magnificent Mile, Chicago
- Oak Brook, Illinois (closed in December 2024)
- Mohegan Sun, Uncasville, Connecticut
- Ilani Casino Resort, La Center, Washington (closed in April 2026)
- Inspire Entertainment Resort, Incheon, South Korea
