= Frederick Hotel (Loup City, Nebraska) =

- U.S. National Register of Historic Places
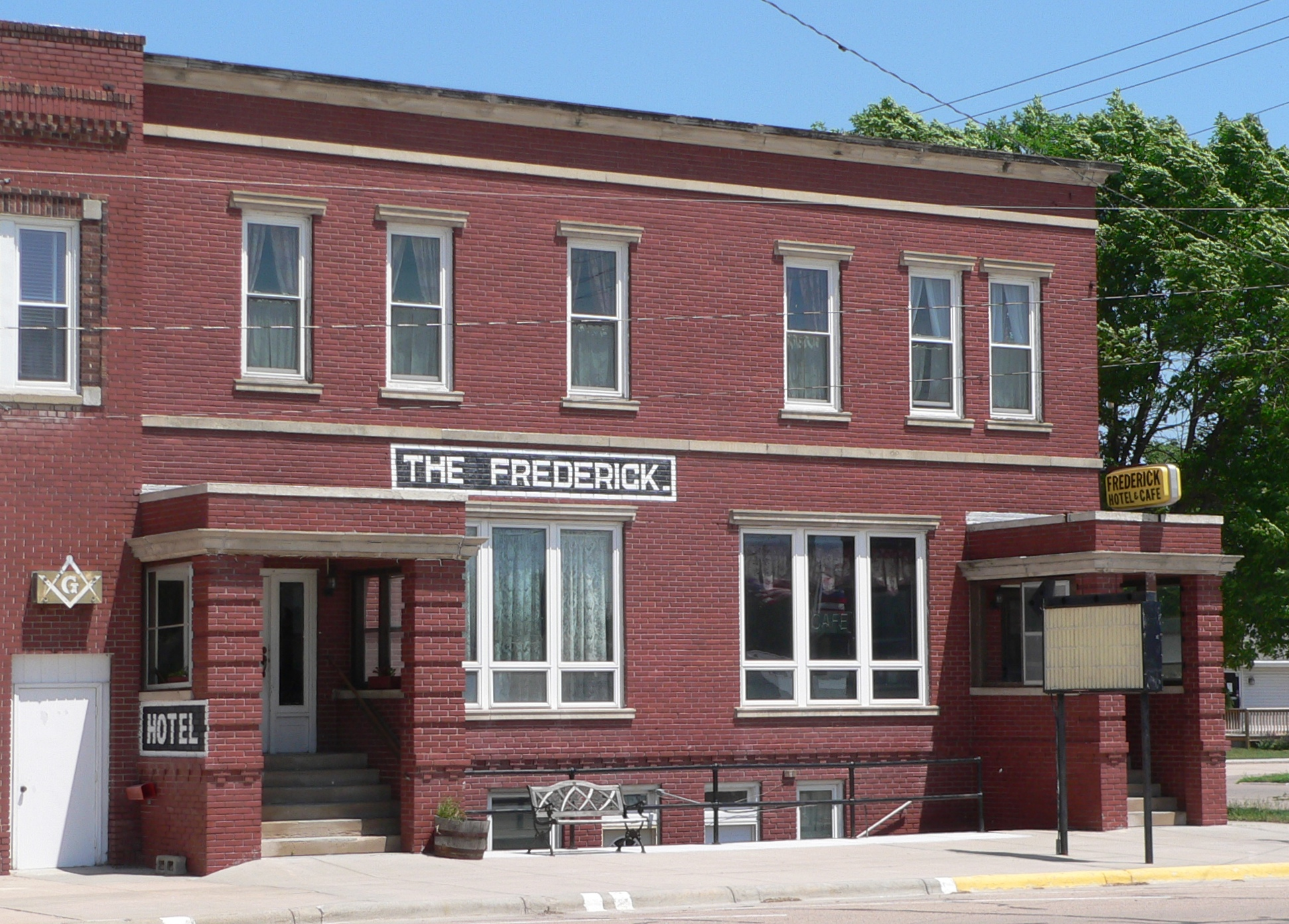
- The hotel in 2010

- Location within Nebraska Location within the United States
- Location: 810 O Street, Loup City, Nebraska
- Coordinates: 41°16′30″N 98°58′09″W
- Area: less than one acre
- Built: 1913
- Built by: O. Almquist
- Architectural style: Early Commercial
- NRHP reference No.: 02000770
- Added to NRHP: October 16, 2002

The Frederick Hotel is a historic building in Loup City, Nebraska. It was built in 1913 for Viola Rosseter Odendahl, the daughter of hotelier Cyrus Rosseter and the widow of druggist Charles Odendahl. In 1939, the hotel was acquired by Odendahl's sons and has undergone a number of ownership changes since then. It has been in continuous operation since it was opened in 1913. The building was listed on the National Register of Historic Places on October 16, 2002. It is now known as The Historic Frederick Hotel.
