= Cosmopolitan of Las Vegas =

Casino hotel on the Las Vegas Strip

The Cosmopolitan of Las Vegas

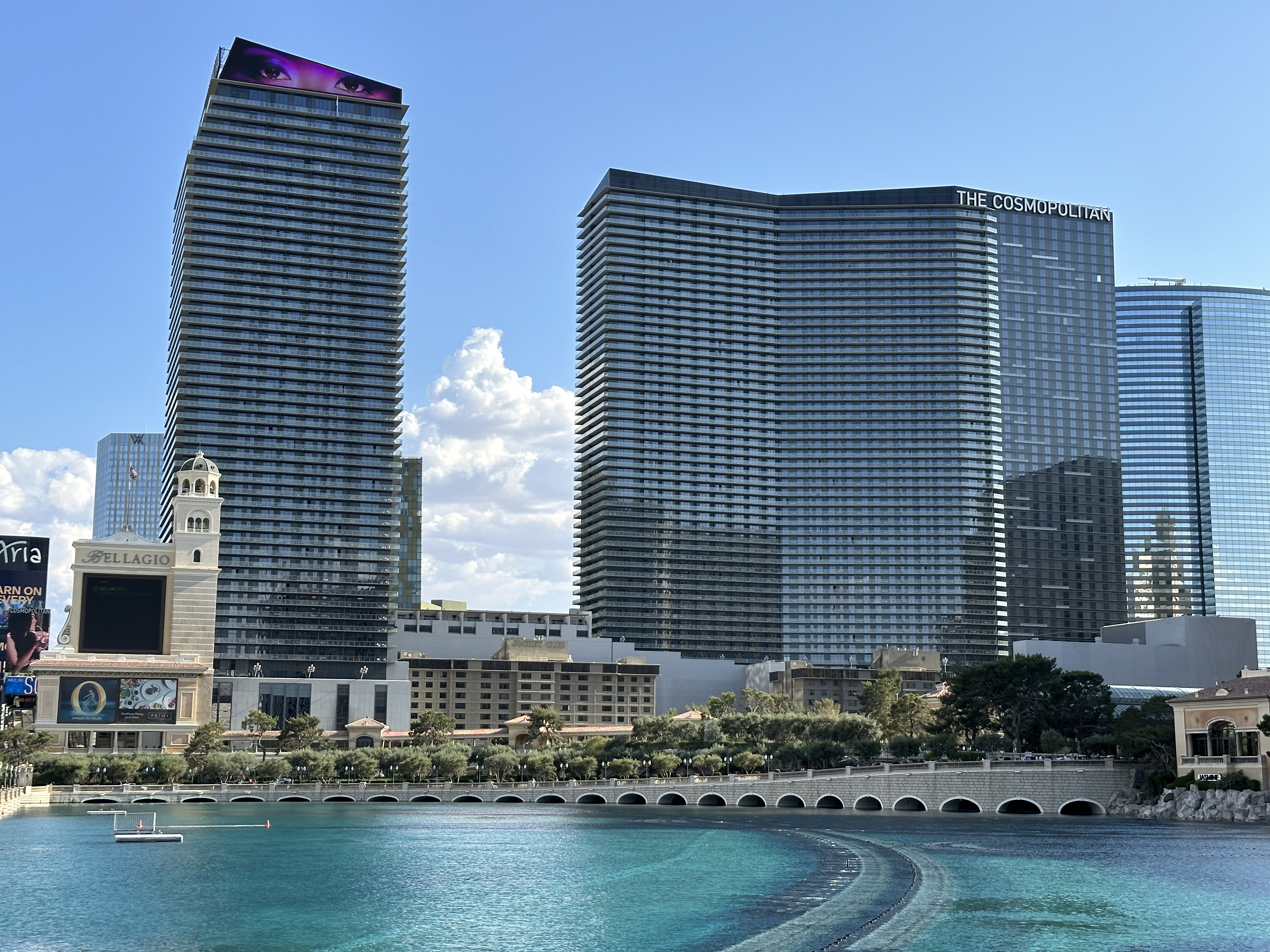

- Location within Las Vegas Strip Location within Nevada
- Interactive map of The Cosmopolitan of Las Vegas
- Location: Paradise, Nevada, U.S.; 3708 South Las Vegas Boulevard; 36.1100°N 115.1753°W
- Opened: December 15, 2010; 15 years ago
- No. of rooms: 3,033
- Gaming space: 100,000 sq ft (9,300 m^{2})
- Signature attractions: The Chelsea; The Chandelier; Marquee Nightclub & Dayclub; P3 art studio
- Notable restaurants: China Poblano é Jaleo; Momofuku; Scarpetta; STK; Superfrico
- Casino type: Land-based
- Owner: The Blackstone Group; Cherng Family Trust; Stonepeak Partners
- Operating license holder: MGM Resorts International
- Architect: Friedmutter Group (executive architect); Arquitectonica
- Renovated in: 2015–2018
- Website: www.cosmopolitanlasvegas.com

The Cosmopolitan of Las Vegas (commonly referred to simply as The Cosmopolitan or The Cosmo) is a resort casino and hotel on the Las Vegas Strip in Paradise, Nevada. It is owned by the Blackstone Group, Stonepeak Partners, and the Cherng Family Trust, and operated by MGM Resorts International. The resort includes a 100,000 sq ft (9,300 m^{2}) casino and 3,033 rooms across two towers, as well as a 3,200-seat performance theater and various restaurants.

The project was announced in 2004, by a joint venture that included real estate developer Ian Bruce Eichner. Construction on the hotel towers began in April 2007, following excavation work for an underground parking garage. Deutsche Bank helped finance the project, and eventually took over ownership in September 2008, after the original developers defaulted on a loan. The resort's interior underwent several redesigns, and plans to include a condo hotel component were ultimately scrapped.

The Cosmopolitan opened on December 15, 2010, and at $3.9 billion, it was the most expensive Strip resort built up to that point. The resort proved to be popular, although casino revenue lagged behind other amenities. Deutsche Bank sold the resort to The Blackstone Group in 2014, for $1.7 billion. Blackstone made numerous changes which improved gaming revenue, and the company also negotiated a deal with the Culinary Workers Union, whose members had protested at the resort over the lack of a union contract. The resort operations were sold to MGM in 2022, while Cherng and Stonepeak joined Blackstone as owners.

== History ==
=== Background and construction ===
Plans for the property were first announced in April 2004. The developer, 3700 Associates, was a joint venture formed by David Friedman (a former Las Vegas Sands executive), Ian Bruce Eichner (a real estate developer), and Soros Fund Management. The development group purchased the future site of the resort for $90 million, from a company controlled by Margaret Elardi, former owner of the New Frontier. Further details about the project, including the Cosmopolitan name, were released in November 2004.

The project was expected to cost $1.5 billion, with the opening initially scheduled for late 2007 or early 2008. The majority of the resort's rooms were planned as condo hotel units. Sales began in February 2005, helping to finance construction of the resort. A partnership was announced in April 2005 for Hyatt Hotels to operate the Cosmopolitan's hotel and condo hotel units under the Grand Hyatt name. However, the condo component was largely scrapped by the time of the resort's opening.

A groundbreaking ceremony was held on October 25, 2005. Perini Building Company served as general contractor. The Cosmopolitan was built on 8.5 acres, considered small in comparison to most Strip resorts. The minimal acreage necessitated a vertical design. In January 2006, Deutsche Bank provided a $415 million loan to finance excavation for an underground parking garage. Perini spent approximately a year excavating 60 feet below ground. Construction on the hotel towers began on April 9, 2007, with the placing of the first steel beam. In total, the project would use 41,000 tons of steel.

The Cosmopolitan property surrounds the Jockey Club timeshare buildings to the north. The resort was built on what used to be the parking lot for the Jockey Club, whose residents were provided parking space beneath the new resort. County building planners had concerns about the project's density; its hotel towers were built directly alongside the Jockey Club, separated by five feet at the closest point.

In January 2008, the Cosmopolitan's developer defaulted on a $760 million construction loan from Deutsche Bank, and resort officials sought to raise an additional $400 million for construction. With the Cosmopolitan facing foreclosure, Hyatt partnered with project lender Marathon Asset Management to buy out Eichner and complete the resort. However, Hyatt and Marathon could not come to an agreement with Deutsche Bank, which began foreclosure proceedings in March 2008. Hyatt had no further involvement in the project, and Deutsche Bank was unable to attract any other buyers.

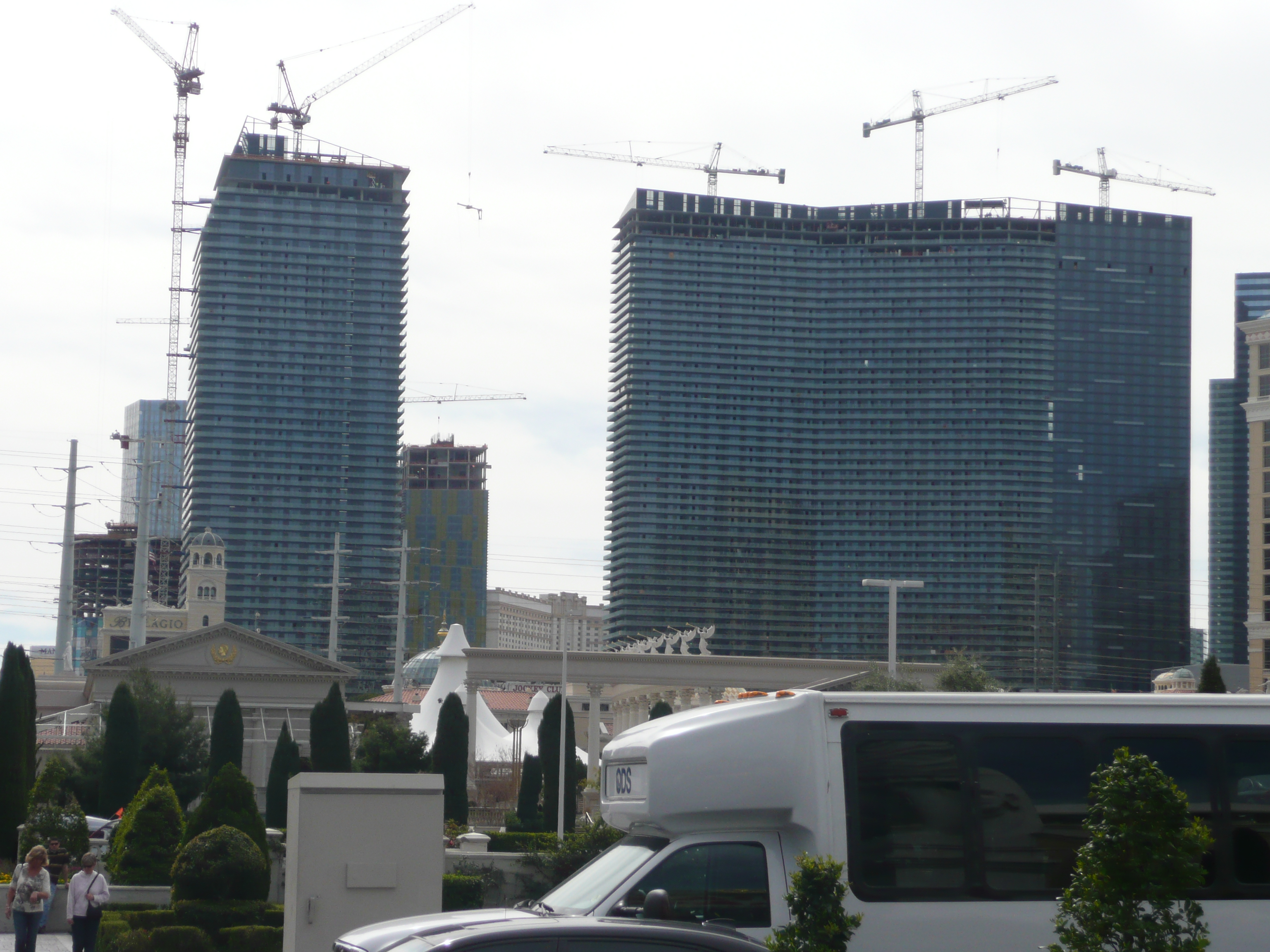
Cosmopolitan under construction in February 2009

Construction continued, and Deutsche Bank took over ownership in September 2008, purchasing the project out of foreclosure for nearly $1 billion. The bank held discussions to partner with a gaming operator, such as MGM Mirage or Hilton Hotels. Hilton announced its upscale Denizen Hotels brand in March 2009, and considered renaming the Cosmopolitan under this name. However, further development of the brand was suspended a month later, following Starwood Hotels' accusations of industrial espionage.

Deutsche Bank ultimately decided against a third-party hotel operator. At the end of 2009, the bank filed for a gaming license as the resort's sole owner. By that point, the project was two years behind schedule and $2 billion over budget. At a final cost of $3.9 billion, it was the most expensive Las Vegas resort built up to that point. The rising price of construction materials, as well as subsequent redesigns, had contributed to the overall cost.

=== Opening and ownership changes ===
The Cosmopolitan opened on December 15, 2010. A grand opening celebration took place a few weeks later during New Year's Eve, with performances by Coldplay and Jay-Z. The hotel opened with 2,000 of its 2,995 rooms, the remainder expected to be open by July 2011. Ahead of its opening, the Cosmopolitan had run Surrealist and sexualized advertisements, which generated a mixed response but nonetheless created publicity for the resort.

The Cosmopolitan struggled in its early years amid the aftermath of the Great Recession. It was the last new resort to be built on the Strip until the completion of Resorts World Las Vegas in 2021. The Cosmopolitan saw favorable reviews upon opening, and the hotel rooms, among the most expensive in Las Vegas, were often sold out. The resort's restaurants and clubs were its most popular features. Despite this, the resort would remain unprofitable for years. Like at other Las Vegas casinos, the Cosmopolitan's younger target demographic showed less interest in gambling, an important revenue generator. Furthermore, the property's primary attractions – including retail, restaurants, and pools – were built on the second and third floors, away from the casino's ground-floor location; most Strip casinos intersperse their attractions throughout the casino floor to encourage gambling. The resort added a high-limit gaming area as part of efforts to boost revenue.

Deutsche Bank had always intended to sell the Cosmopolitan. A deal was announced in May 2014, to sell the resort for $1.7 billion to The Blackstone Group. The sale was finalized on December 19, 2014. Blackstone sought to improve the resort's gaming revenue by revamping the casino floor. The company also made changes to the restaurants and entertainment offerings as part of a $200 million project. The changes were successful, and the resort saw its first quarterly profit in 2015.

Blackstone applied its business strategy – "buy it, fix it, sell it" – to the Cosmopolitan. In 2019, the company began considering a sale of the resort, after spending approximately $500 million in improvements. In 2021, Blackstone reached a deal to sell the resort operations to MGM Resorts International. In addition, the real estate assets would be sold to a joint venture consisting of Cherng Family Trust (headed by Panda Express founders Andrew and Peggy Cherng), Stonepeak Partners (an investment firm), and Real Estate Income Trust Inc. (Blackstone's real estate fund). Both sales were finalized on May 17, 2022. MGM purchased the operations for $1.6 billion, while the real estate sold for more than $4 billion, the deal totaling $5.6 billion.

=== 2015 fire ===
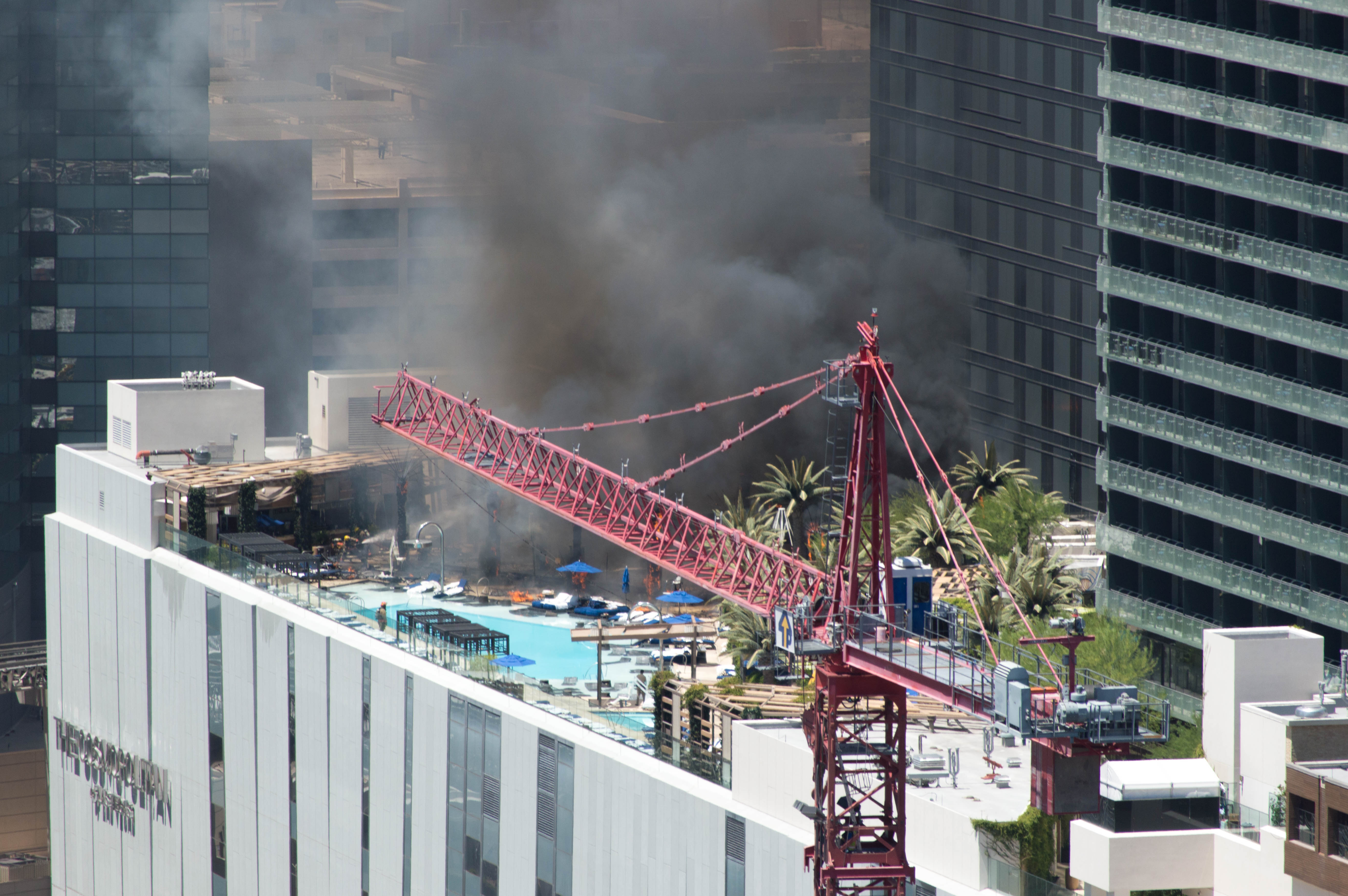
The fire 20 minutes after it was reported, seen from the rooftop terrace of Marriott's Grand Chateau.

A two-alarm fire occurred on July 25, 2015, on the 14th floor pool deck of the west hotel tower. The fire began in a pool cabana and spread across flammable fake trees, made of high-density foam and plastic. The blaze began around 12:15 p.m., and was extinguished by firefighters within a half-hour.

Several hotel floors were evacuated, as smoke had entered the tower through open windows. The evacuated floors suffered water damage after fire sprinklers were activated. Two people were treated for smoke inhalation, and one of them was taken to a local hospital.

The pool reopened a day later, with the damaged area closed off. The cause of the fire could not be determined, although electrical issues were ruled out. Improperly discarded cigarettes were found on the pool deck, but fire officials could not prove definitively that this was the cause.

== Litigation and controversies ==
=== Name ===
Hearst Corporation, publisher of Cosmopolitan, filed a trademark infringement lawsuit against the resort in June 2008. The suit accused the resort of trying to deceive patrons into believing that there was an affiliation with the magazine. Hearst sought $500,000 in damages and a portion of future profits from the resort. A settlement was announced in March 2010. The property, originally known as The Cosmopolitan Resort and Casino, would instead be called The Cosmopolitan of Las Vegas.

=== Condominiums ===
Prior to Deutsche Bank's acquisition, the resort had sold 1,821 condo hotel units. In February 2009, columnist Robin Leach and two Las Vegas show producers filed a class action lawsuit against 3700 Associates and Deutsche Bank. Leach and the producers had purchased units at the Cosmopolitan, and their suit alleged breach of contract over the lengthy construction schedule and delays. Another class action suit, representing 200 disgruntled buyers, was filed shortly thereafter.

A third lawsuit was eventually filed, and the cases were consolidated later in 2009. More than 400 buyers sought to regain their deposits, which amounted to more than $200 million. Deutsche Bank eventually offered partial refunds to buyers. Additional lawsuits were filed in July 2010, alleging that the condominium component had been canceled without any notification to the buyers. Approximately 1,600 buyers had accepted partial refunds as of October 2010, leaving 216 buyers who wanted full refunds. Most of the lawsuits had been settled as of 2012. Some buyers decided to close escrow on their units, and the Cosmopolitan has gradually bought them back as the opportunity arises. As of 2021, the resort includes 14 condo units, and owners have the option of renting them out as hotel rooms.

=== Union dispute ===
Upon its opening, the Cosmopolitan was one of only a few non-union resorts on the Strip. In 2011, workers voted via card check to unionize through the Culinary Workers Union, which represents the majority of Strip resort workers. Negotiations over the next 18 months were slow-going and focused only on minor issues, according to the union. A series of Culinary protests took place at the resort beginning in January 2013, in hopes of expediting discussions. These marked the first Strip resort protests since 2003, when Culinary demonstrated at the Aladdin.

A March 2013 protest resulted in the arrests of 98 union members after they blocked traffic in front of the Cosmopolitan. Subsequent protests included support from members of the California School Employees Association, and the Asian Pacific American Labor Alliance. In August 2013, Culinary vowed to start protesting at the Cosmopolitan on a weekly basis. The Alliance to Protect Nevada Jobs (APNJ) was opposed to these protests, stating that they were hurting Las Vegas tourism. In October 2013, the APNJ launched counter demonstrations at the Cosmopolitan, handing out "thank you" cards to guests. Meanwhile, Culinary members began an insult campaign toward Cosmopolitan visitors. In November 2013, more than 100 union members were arrested after protesting inside the resort.

Despite the lack of a union contract, workers were allowed to keep their jobs amid the 2014 ownership change. Blackstone vowed to negotiate with Culinary, eventually reaching agreement on a union contract at the end of 2015.

=== Banning of guests ===
In April 2011, Cosmopolitan security staff allegedly removed a transgender guest named Stephanie from a women's restroom, photographed her, and said that she would be banned for life if she did not leave the premises. Shortly after the incident, the Cosmopolitan was flooded with complaints on its Facebook page, which prompted the resort to issue an apology to the transgender community and to Stephanie, stating that she was welcome to come back to the resort anytime. The incident also prompted the hotel-casino to train its staff on awareness initiatives involving the sensitive issue.

In November 2017, former football player and actor O. J. Simpson was banned from the Cosmopolitan after spending time in a restaurant and lounge there with friends. He was accused of trespassing and said he was given no further explanation. It was later reported that he had been drunk and disruptive, claims which he said were false and made by the resort. Simpson, who is black, accused the Cosmopolitan of racial discrimination. He sued the resort for defamation in November 2019, stating that claims of his disruptive behavior had harmed his reputation. The Cosmopolitan denied that it had defamed Simpson. A settlement was reached in 2021.

Rapper Meek Mill, who is also black, was banned from the resort as well in May 2019. Mill was accused of trespassing after trying to attend a party at the resort's Marquee dayclub. According to the Cosmopolitan, he was denied entry because the club had reached its maximum capacity. Mill said, however, that he was also prohibited from entering other areas of the resort, including its restaurants. Mill accused the Cosmopolitan of racial discrimination and threatened to sue, until the resort issued a public apology a few days later.

== Design ==
The Cosmopolitan features a modern design, and unlike other resorts on the Strip, it lacks a theme. The Las Vegas-based Friedmutter Group served as executive architect, working with Arquitectonica. Dougall Design and Paul Duesing Partners worked on interior designs early in the project's history.

After taking ownership of the resort in 2008, Deutsche Bank hired The Related Companies, a real estate developer, to oversee the project. W.A. Richardson Builders was hired as a consultant on the design and construction of the casino area. Related made various recommendations, such as relocating the casino entrance onto the Strip. Eichner's original plans called for the casino to be on the second floor, where the resort's retail component was ultimately built instead.

The Cosmopolitan's interior design also underwent several revisions. The original design was partially inspired by Eichner's wife Leslie, and described by the Las Vegas Sun as "a flashy, glam-rock look, with bold prints and big mirrors". Related found the interior too flashy and recommended a more muted appearance, which Deutsche Bank eventually rejected. The bank then commissioned Friedmutter to work with CAD International on a new design. Deutsche Bank had the room interiors and public spaces reworked to better suit the property's Las Vegas clientele. Designer David Rockwell was ultimately credited with Friedmutter and CAD for the resort interiors, including the hotel rooms.

South of Cosmopolitan is CityCenter, a mixed-use development consisting of glass high-rises. Due to its similar design, the Cosmopolitan is sometimes mistaken as part of CityCenter.

== Features ==
=== Casino and hotel ===
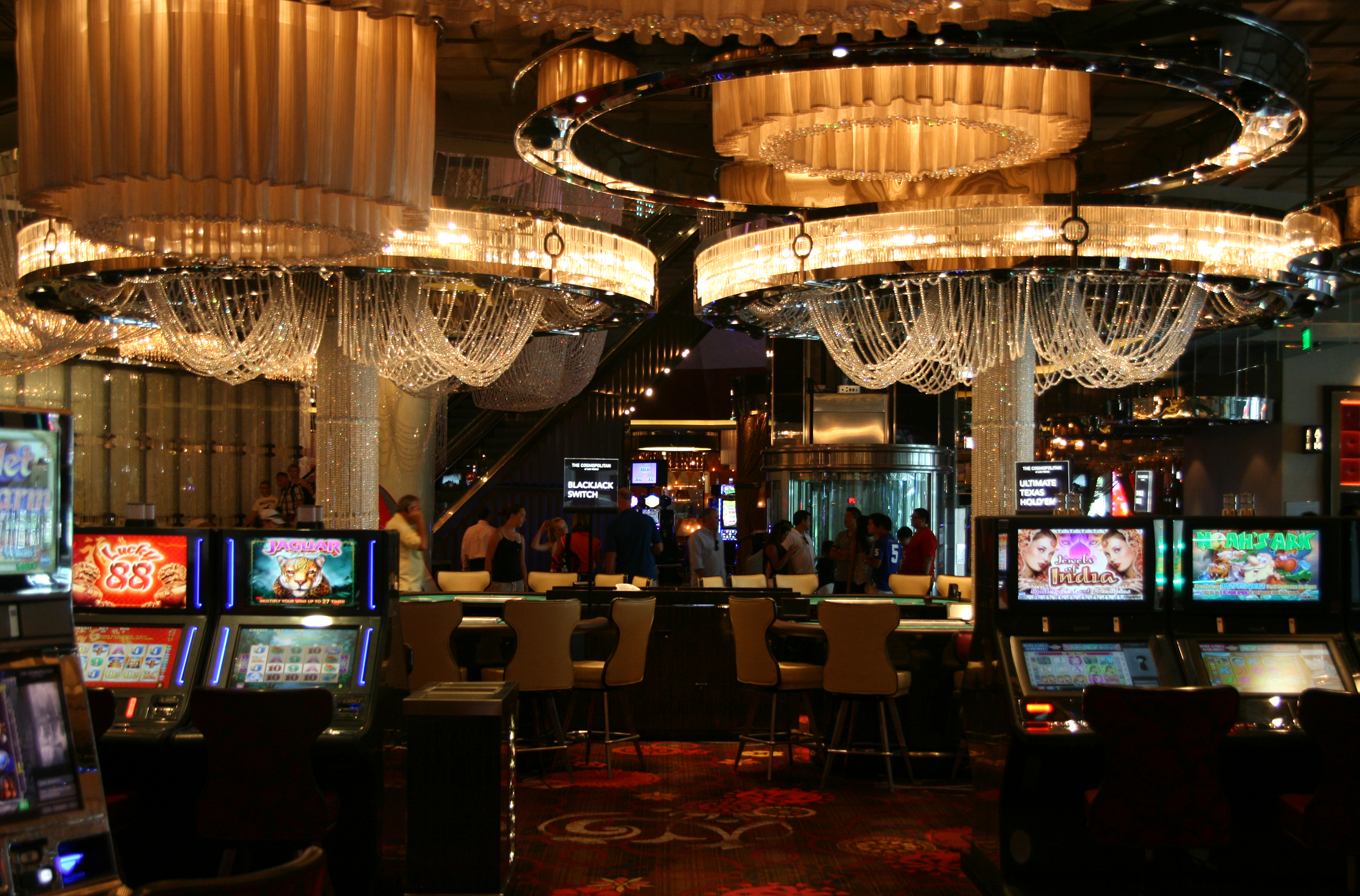
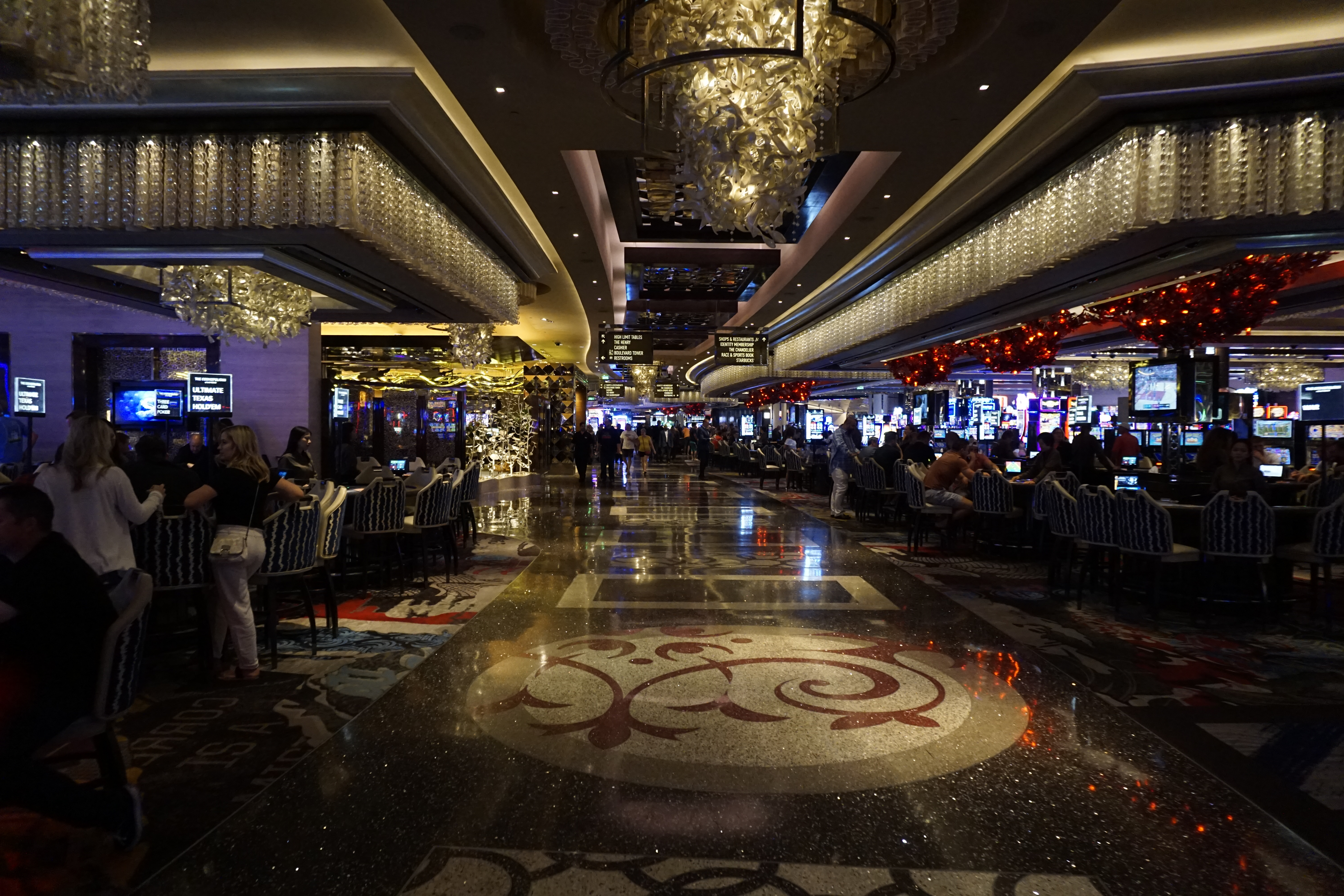
Casino floor in 2012 (top), and in 2019 after renovations.

The Cosmopolitan includes a 100,000 sq ft (9,300 m^{2}) casino. It opened with 1,400 slot machines and 80 table games. A high-limit gaming area, the Talon Club, was added in November 2011. Located on the second floor above the main casino, the Talon Club featured 15 table games and helped improve gaming revenue.

Upon taking over ownership in 2014, Blackstone sought to focus on the Asian high roller market. The company modified the casino layout, and added The Reserve, a 2,300 sq ft (210 m^{2}) high-limit area. The existing Talon Club was also increased to feature 20 table games. In addition, Blackstone removed 40 chandeliers from the casino floor to make it more spacious, and replaced nearly half of the slot machines. Book & Stage – a sportsbook, bar, and occasional music venue – opened along with the resort. It did not meet financial expectations and was eventually closed in 2015. A larger sportsbook opened elsewhere in the resort in 2016, and included a 24-hour bar offering video poker. Gaming revenue improved following the various changes to the casino. After taking over operations in 2022, MGM rebranded the sportsbook as part of its BetMGM service, replacing William Hill.

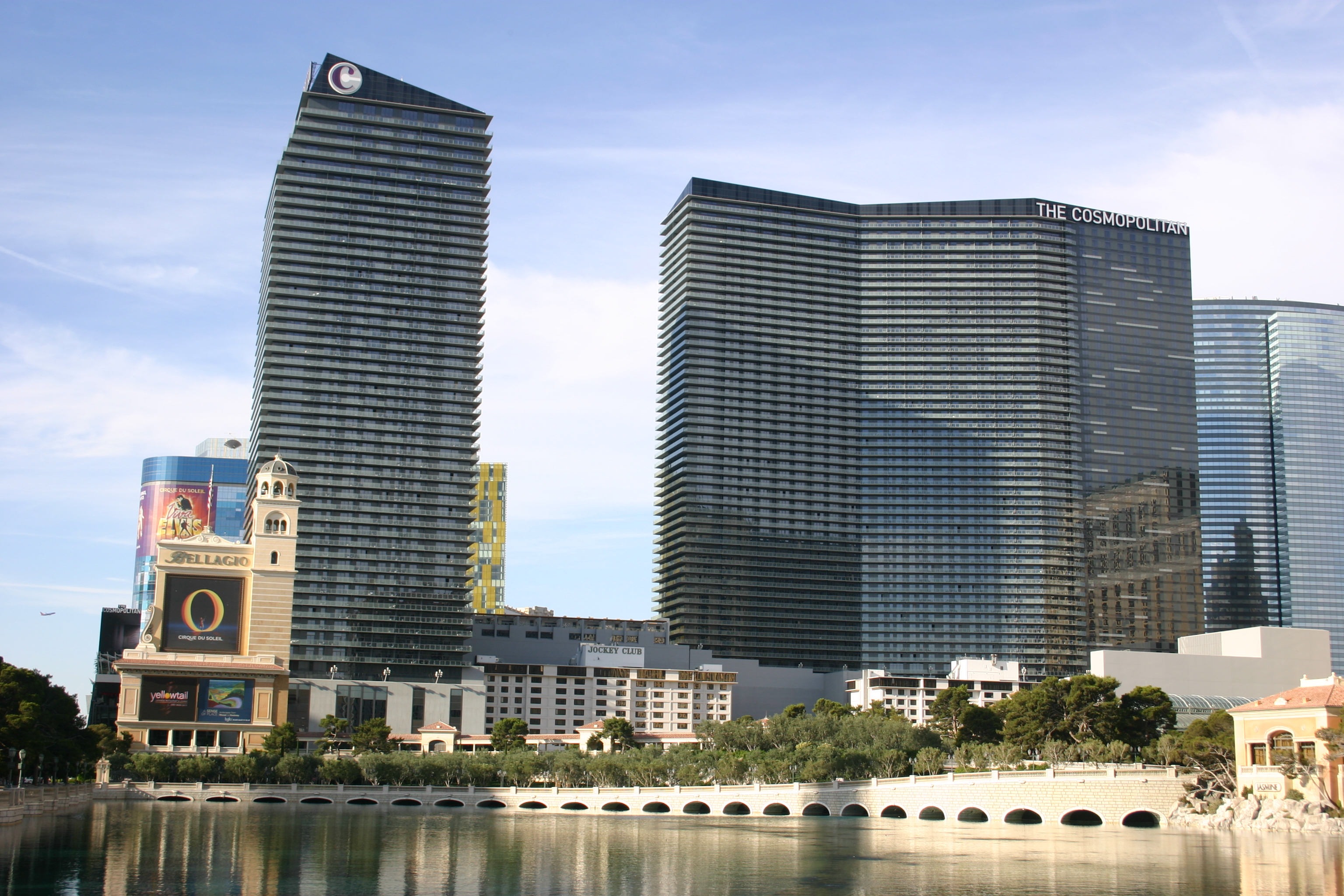
The Boulevard (left) and Chelsea towers

The hotel has 3,033 rooms across two towers. The western tower is known as the Chelsea and serves as the main hotel building. The Boulevard Tower is located along Las Vegas Boulevard, east of the Chelsea Tower. The Chelsea and Boulevard towers are 52 and 50 stories respectively.

In a departure from most Strip resorts, many of the Cosmopolitan's rooms include balconies. They also include kitchenettes and large bathrooms, leftover features from when they were planned as condominium units. Since its opening, the hotel has been a member of Marriott International's Autograph Collection, which consists of upscale hotels owned and operated independently of Marriott. Through the partnership, the Cosmopolitan has access to Marriott's database of customers. In 2011, the resort opened its two-story Lanai suites to the general public. Located in the west tower, they had previously been used primarily for high rollers and VIPs.

Most of the rooms were remodeled from 2017 to 2018. The resort considered 20 potential room designs and spent $2.5 million building 14 model rooms before making its final choice. The hotel also built 21 luxury penthouse suites in the top four floors of the Boulevard Tower, using space that had sat undeveloped since the resort's opening. Up to that point, the Cosmopolitan only had four rooms for its top gamblers. As a result, it had been unable to compete adequately for high rollers. The penthouses were added as part of efforts to improve gaming revenue, especially with the Asian market. They were designed by Adam Tihany.

=== Restaurants ===
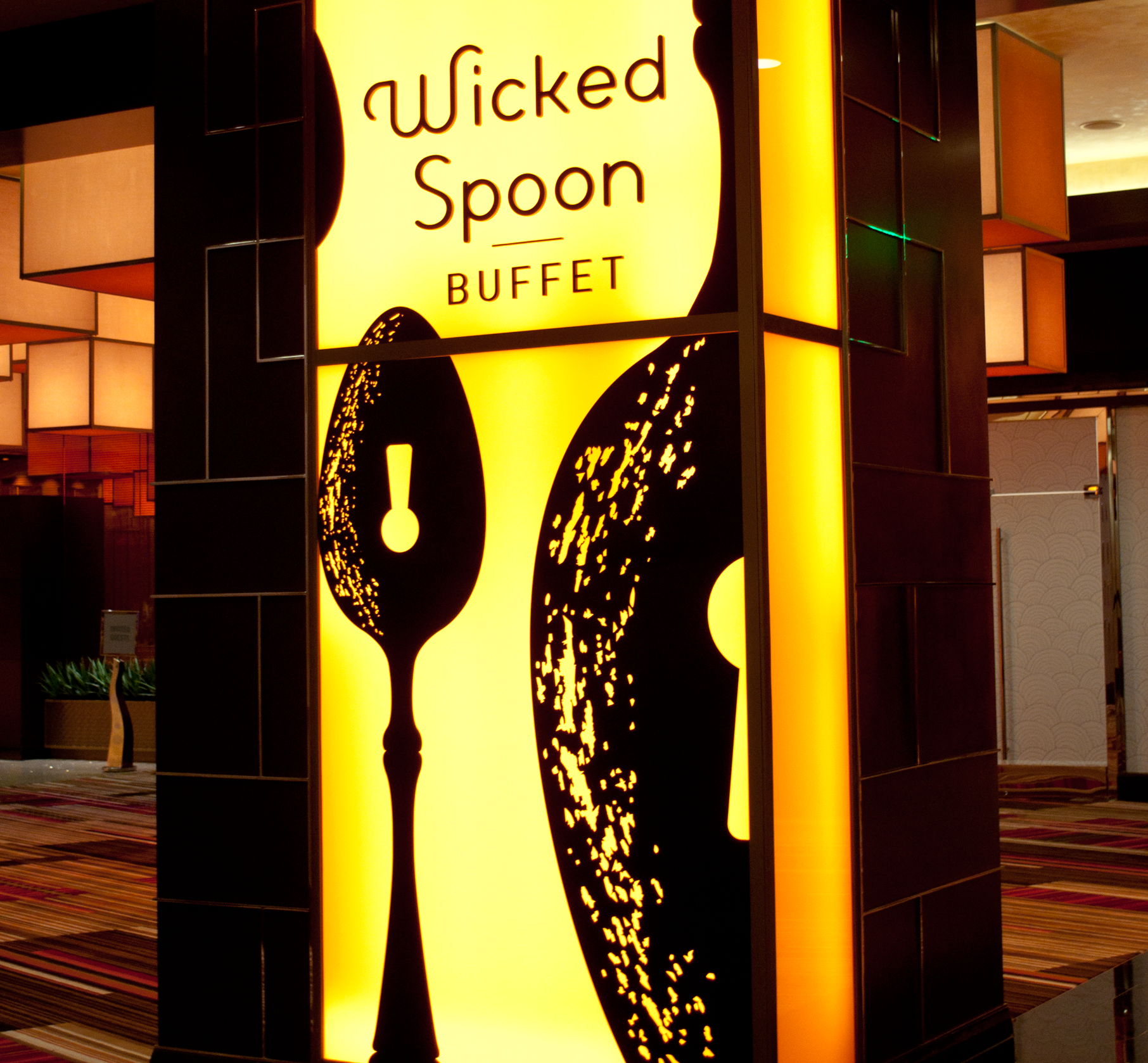
Wicked Spoon Buffet

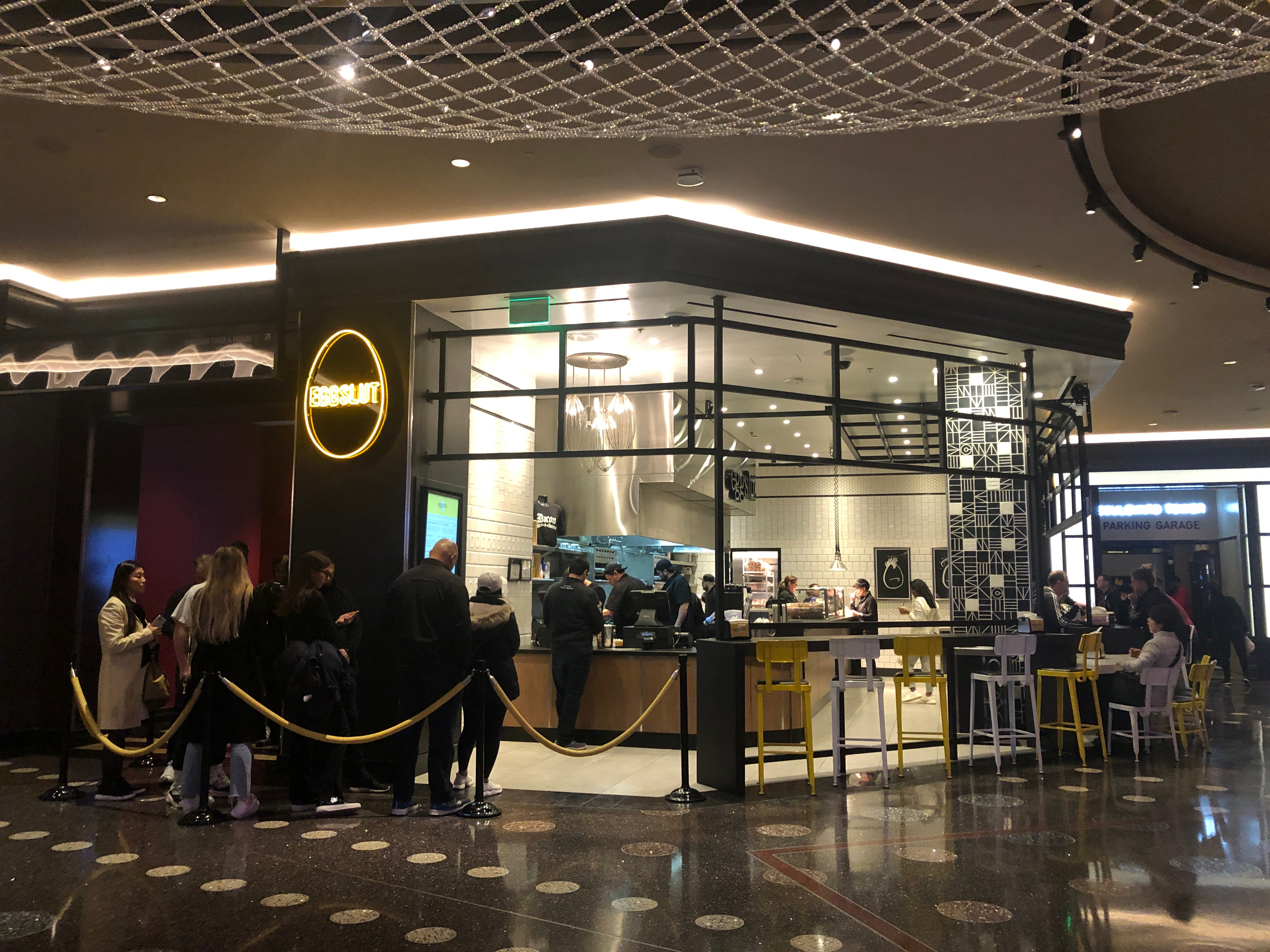
Eggslut

The Cosmopolitan opened with numerous restaurants, including Scarpetta by chef Scott Conant, Comme Ça by chef David Myers, and the STK Steakhouse by One Group. Brothers Bruce and Eric Bromberg opened Blue Ribbon Sushi Bar & Grill, marking their first restaurant outside of New York. It was renovated in 2017 and renamed simply Blue Ribbon, with a new menu. Since opening, the resort has also included the popular Wicked Spoon Buffet.

Unlike other Strip resorts, most of the Cosmopolitan's restaurants were situated together rather than being spread throughout the property. The resort also includes a hidden eatery – an unnamed pizza shop (commonly referred to as Secret Pizza) – that is accessed through an unmarked doorway and corridor. Chef and owner Christina Tosi opened a Milk Bar bakery at the resort in 2016. It was the 10th Milk Bar to open, and the only location to feature alcoholic milkshakes. Another eatery, Holsteins, also offered alcohol-infused milkshakes as well as burgers, but has since closed and reopened off-strip.

An Eggslut opened in the resort in 2016. The Block 16 Urban Food Hall opened in the Boulevard Tower two years later, and featured six eateries. Among them was Nashville-based Hattie B's Hot Chicken and Portland chef Andy Ricker's Thai restaurant, Pok Pok Wing. The latter closed in December 2020, due to the end of its licensing agreement. In 2017, chef David Chang opened a Momofuku at the resort. Four years later, he opened a second Asian restaurant, Bāng Bar, in Block 16.

Chef José Andrés has several restaurants at the resort, including Jaleo, which serves Spanish food; and China Poblano, serving Chinese and Mexican. Jaleo includes a nine-seat restaurant-within-a-restaurant known as é, which avoids advertising in order to maintain exclusivity.

estiatorio Milos, a Greek seafood restaurant, was among the resort's original eateries, eventually closing in 2020 and relocating to the Venetian. LPM, a chain of French-Mediterranean restaurants, opened in November 2023, replacing Estiatorio Milos.

Michelin-starred Chef Jason McLeod opened Amaya in January 2025, filling the vacant space left after Holstein's closed. The modern Mediterranean menu pays homage to coastal Tulum cuisine.

=== Artwork ===
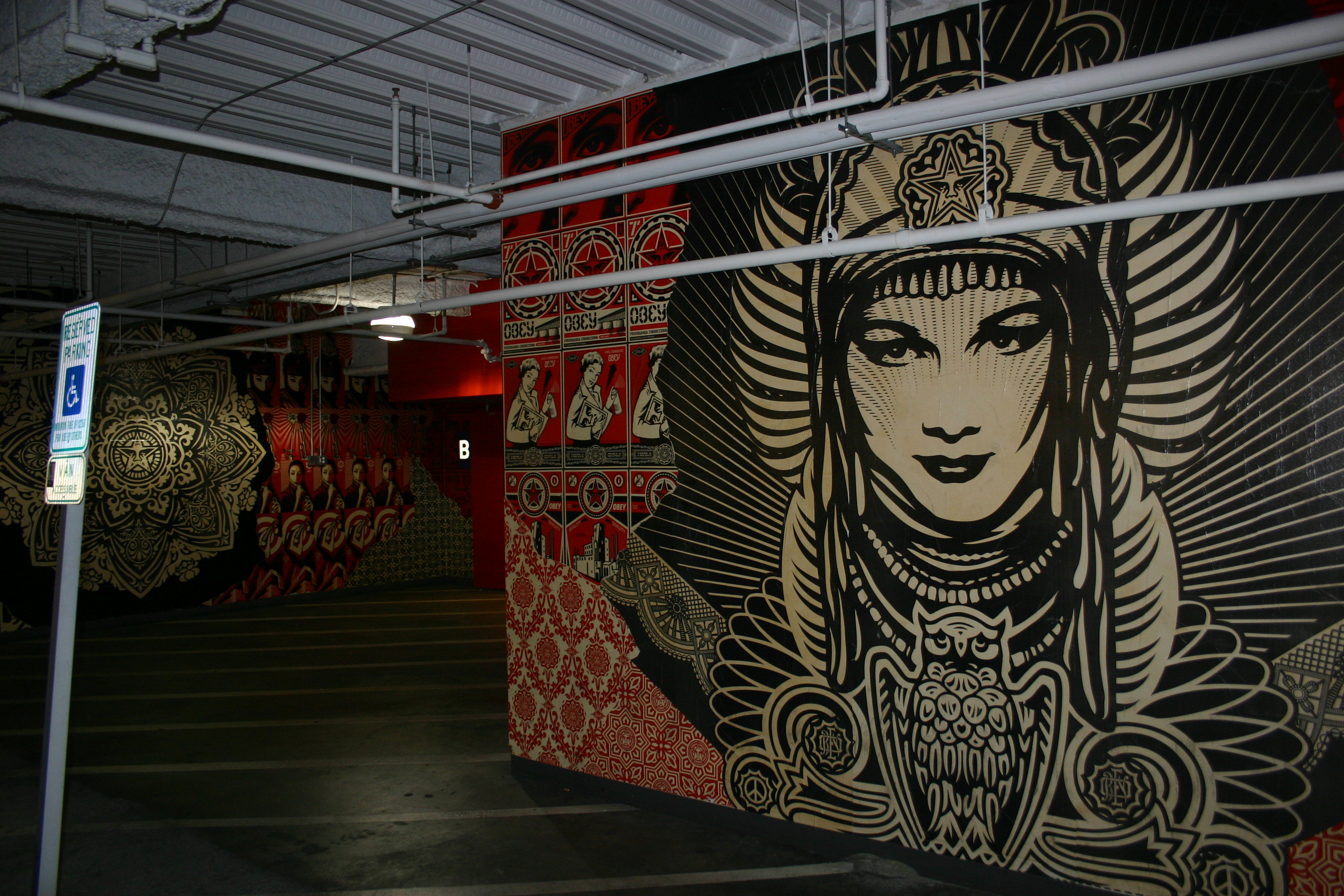
Parking garage art

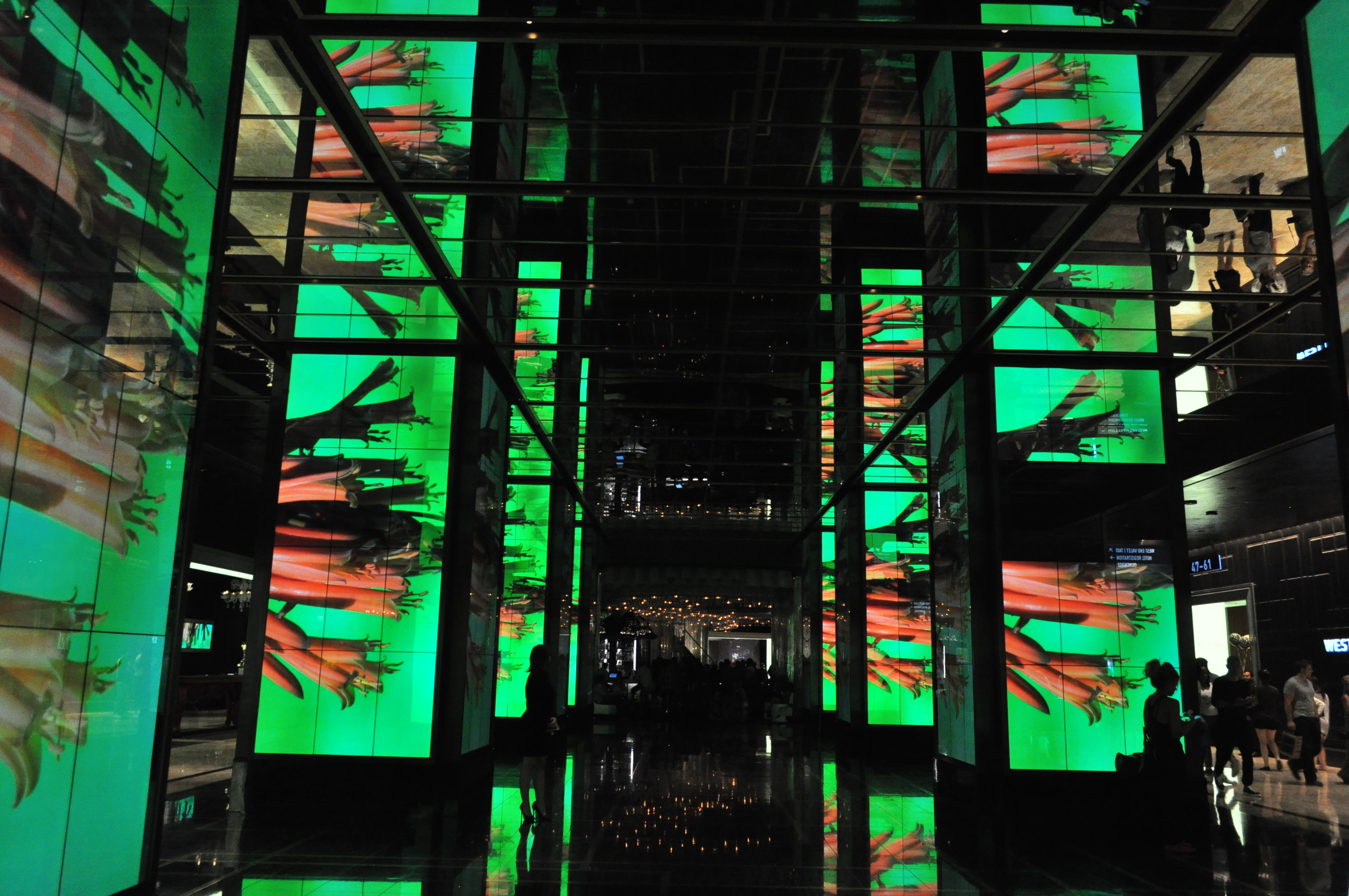
Hotel lobby and its LED screens

Artwork is incorporated throughout the Cosmopolitan, including via its Art-o-mat vending machines. The parking garage interior walls feature graffiti by artists such as Shinique Smith, Kenny Scharf, Retna, and Shepard Fairey. For the casino floor, Roark Gourley created sculptures depicting giant shoes, which became a popular photo spot among visitors. The resort also includes an artist-in-residence program in its P3 studio.

Along the Strip, the property includes a 65-foot-high LED sign that took six months to build. The hotel lobby features floor-to-ceiling columns wrapped in LED screens, depicting various forms of digital art. The lobby's screens, as well as the outdoor sign, showcase the work of various artists. For its digital displays, the resort and its marketing agency, Digital Kitchen, received awards at the 2011 Cannes Lions International Festival of Creativity.

=== Other features ===
The Cosmopolitan opened with a 36,000 sq ft (3,300 m^{2}) shopping area consisting of several luxury retailers. Another signature feature was its pool area. The resort also includes 243,000 sq ft (22,600 m^{2}) of meeting space, and a 43,000 sq ft (4,000 m^{2}) spa and fitness facility.

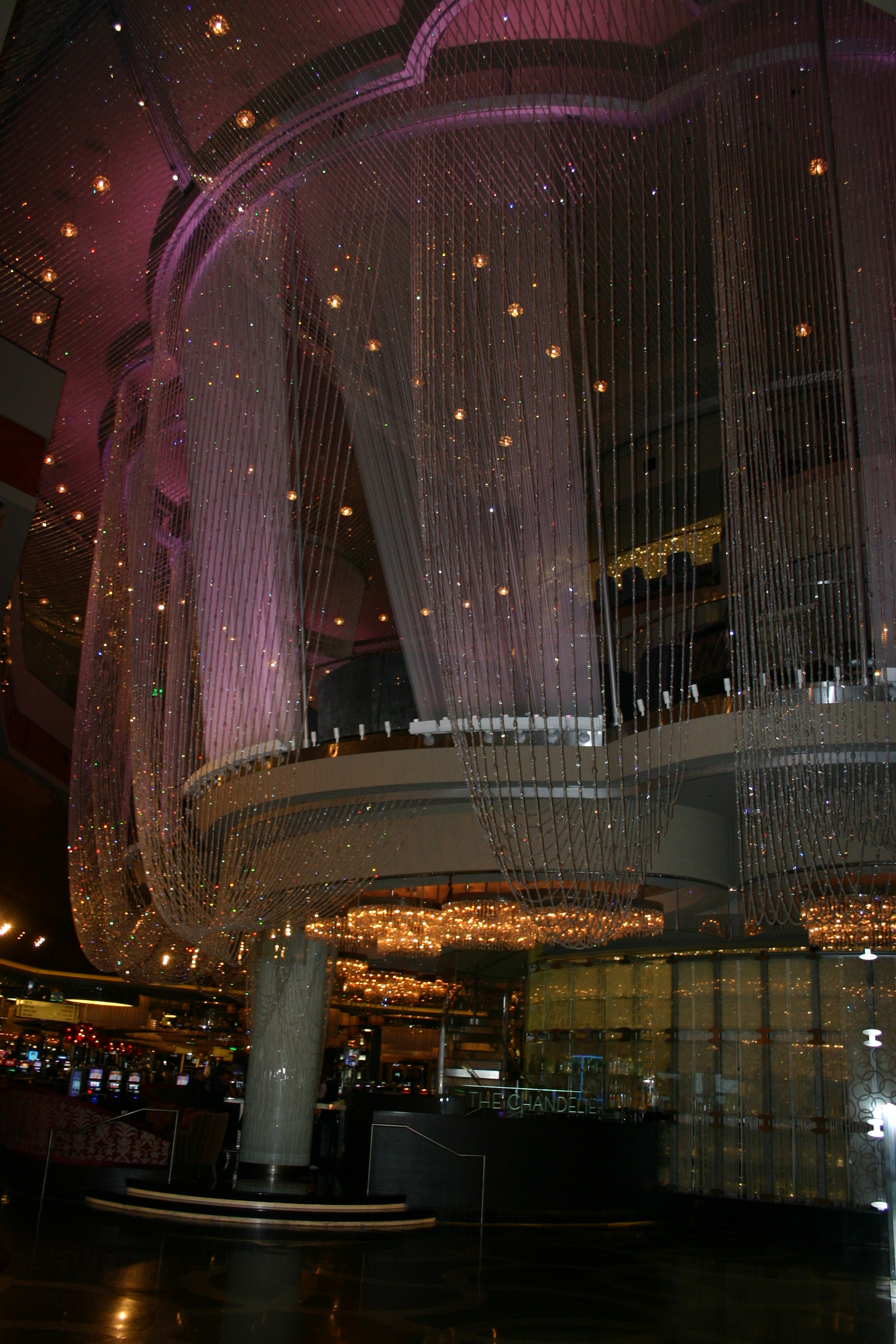
The Chandelier lounge, seen from the main floor in 2011

The property included the Marquee nightclub upon opening. It was designed by Rockwell and is operated by Tao Group Hospitality, and regularly hosts DJs from around the world. It quickly became the top-grossing nightclub in the U.S. Marquee's 22,000 sq ft (2,000 m^{2}) dayclub opened in April 2011, with two main pools and eight private ones. Marquee's pool deck serves as a movie-viewing area during summers and is transformed into an ice-skating rink during winters.

A signature feature on the casino floor is the three-story Chandelier lounge, which includes two million crystals hung from the ceiling. The Chandelier was designed by Rockwell, who said "so much of Las Vegas is experienced horizontally and I felt like this building is very vertical. The idea to have a central, vertical focus and the idea to imagine what would it be like to be inside chandelier were both simultaneous". Portions of the Chandelier were renovated in 2016 and 2017, adding additional seating and a brighter design.

A temporary pop-up wedding chapel opened in 2011, and was replaced the following year by a 25,000 sq ft (2,300 m^{2}) EA Sports bar, featuring sports television coverage and a selection of video games. Cosmopolitan officials planned to continually update the space, located at the resort's entrance along the Strip. During 2012, the resort also hosted two IGN Pro League gaming tournaments.

In 2015, the Cosmopolitan became the first Strip resort to offer Apple Pay terminals throughout its property, with the exception of the casino area. In 2017, the resort introduced a virtual concierge named Rose, designed to help guests and provide recommendations about amenities.

== Live entertainment ==
The Cosmopolitan opened with an entertainment venue known as the Chelsea Ballroom, which hosted Adele's first Las Vegas performance in 2011. The resort has also been host to boxing matches.

In January 2013, plans were announced for the new Chelsea theater, to be built in space that been vacant since the resort's opening. The space had always been intended for a theater, although such plans were delayed due to the resort's financing problems during construction. The Chelsea has 3,200 seats. Bruno Mars opened the venue on December 29, 2013, with his residency show, Bruno Mars at The Chelsea, Las Vegas.

On December 31, 2013, the resort also debuted a separate venue known as "Rose. Rabbit. Lie." Aside from live performances, the space also served as a bar, restaurant, and nightclub. The venue includes a 500-seat theater, originally host to a show by Spiegelworld known as Vegas Nocturne, which featured a variety of performers. Resort and show officials struggled to define Vegas Nocturne, and visitors often confused it with Rose. Rabbit. Lie. The show was expensive to put on, and eventually closed in July 2014. Spiegelworld then sued the resort over a variety of issues, including the lack of severance pay for performers. Spiegelworld also alleged that the resort mishandled marketing for the show, resulting in its demise. The Cosmopolitan filed a countersuit against Spiegelworld, before both sides settled.

In 2018, Rose. Rabbit. Lie. debuted Opium, a sci-fi comedy variety show by Spiegelworld. Set on a spaceship called OPM 73 with a destination of Uranus, the adults-only dinner show features circus-themed routines, loosely tied together with a comedic storyline. Rose. Rabbit. Lie. closed in January 2021, due to a decrease in business brought on by the COVID-19 pandemic. Opium also closed due to the pandemic, but returned in September 2021. Superfrico, an Italian restaurant with a menu by chef Anthony Falco, was simultaneously opened by Spiegelworld to accompany the show. The restaurant is located in the former Rose. Rabbit. Lie. space. Opium was renamed OPM in 2022, and closed in December 2023.

In July 2025, Spiegielworld announced a new show at Superfrico. "The Party" will host 50 people per night and includes a three-course dinner and a "selection of greatest performers from around the world".

== Accolades ==
In 2011, Condé Nast Traveler named the Cosmopolitan to its Hot List of 124 hotels, writing that the resort, despite "fulfilling the formula of any glitzy, behemoth Vegas casino-hotel, manages to feel both unique and intimate. The latter is due in part to the hotel's verticality, which spreads the public areas over three floors instead of one". Later that year, Fodor's named it among the 100 best hotels in the world, praising its design, technological innovation and customer service.

In 2012, the Cosmopolitan was deemed "North America's Best Hotel" by Gogobot. The following year, readers of the Las Vegas Review-Journal named it the best Strip hotel. The resort was also named to Condé Nast Traveler's 2015 Gold List as one of the best hotels in the world.

== In popular culture ==
- The Cosmopolitan was the setting for the fourth season of the reality competition series Top Chef Masters, aired in 2012. The show's contestants lived at the resort and competed at its restaurants.
- The Cosmopolitan is a main location in the music video for The Killers' 2013 song "Shot at the Night".

== Gallery ==
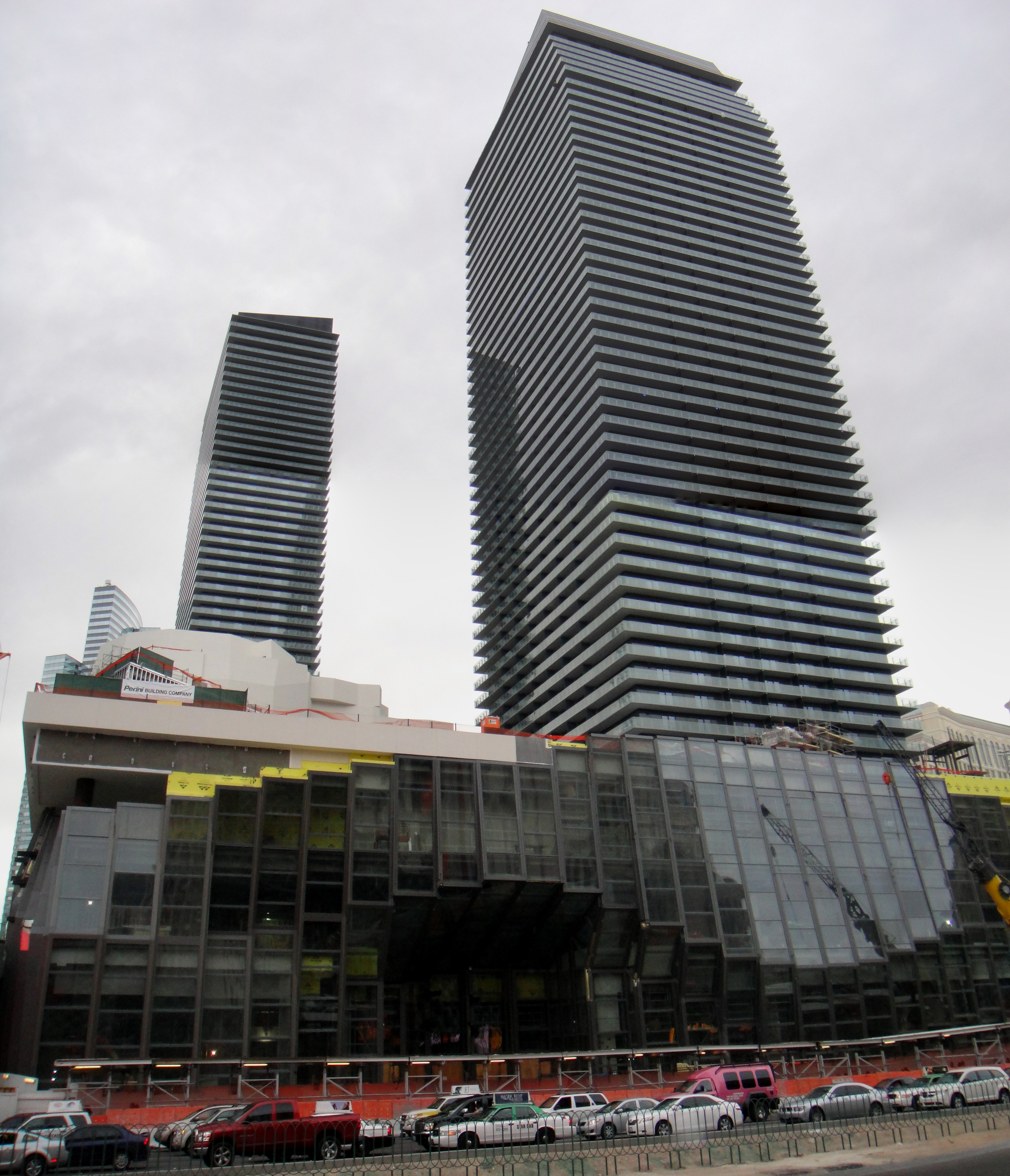
Street front view from across the Strip, during construction in March 2010

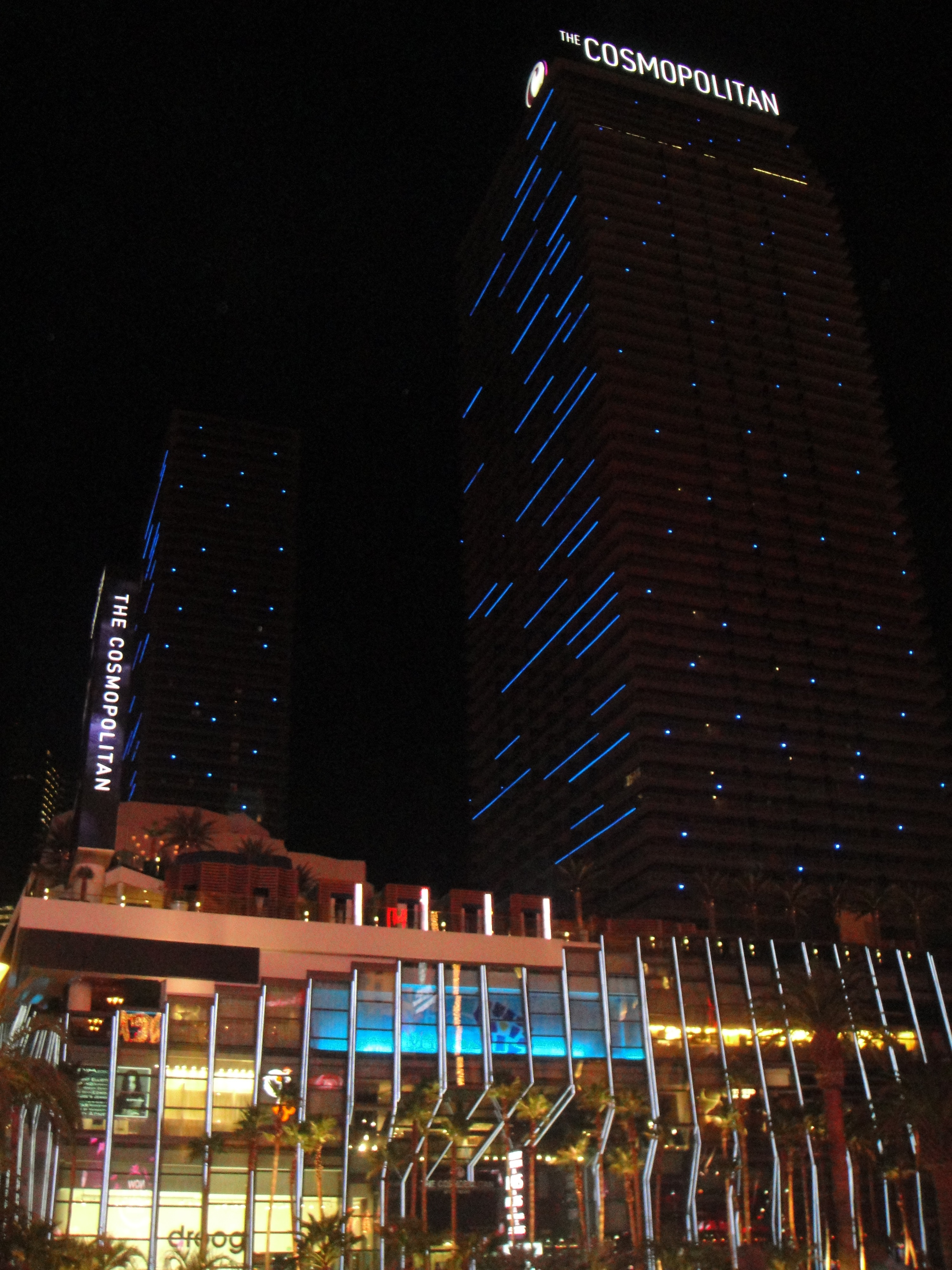
Same view upon completion

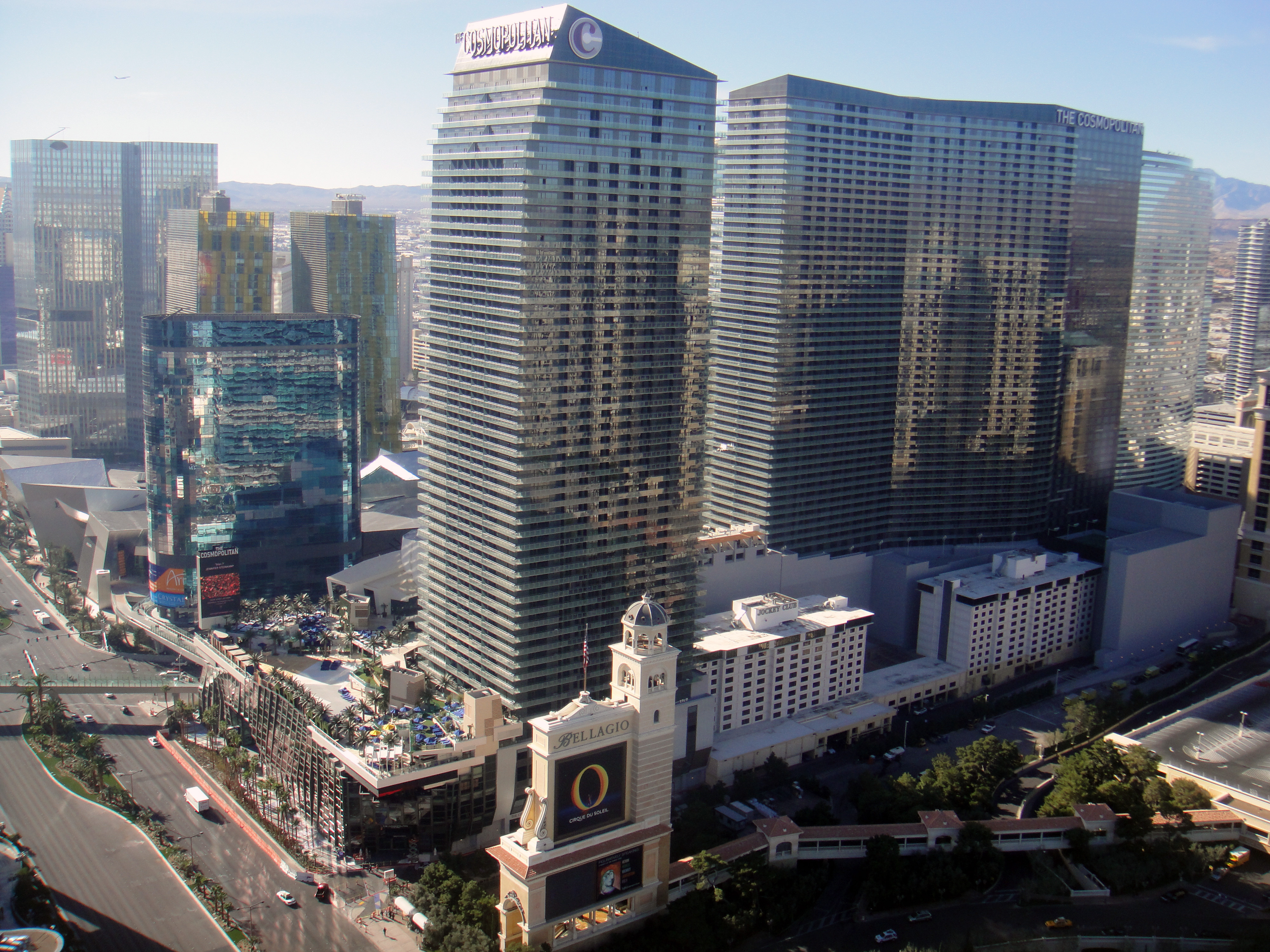
Viewed from the Eiffel Tower at Paris Las Vegas

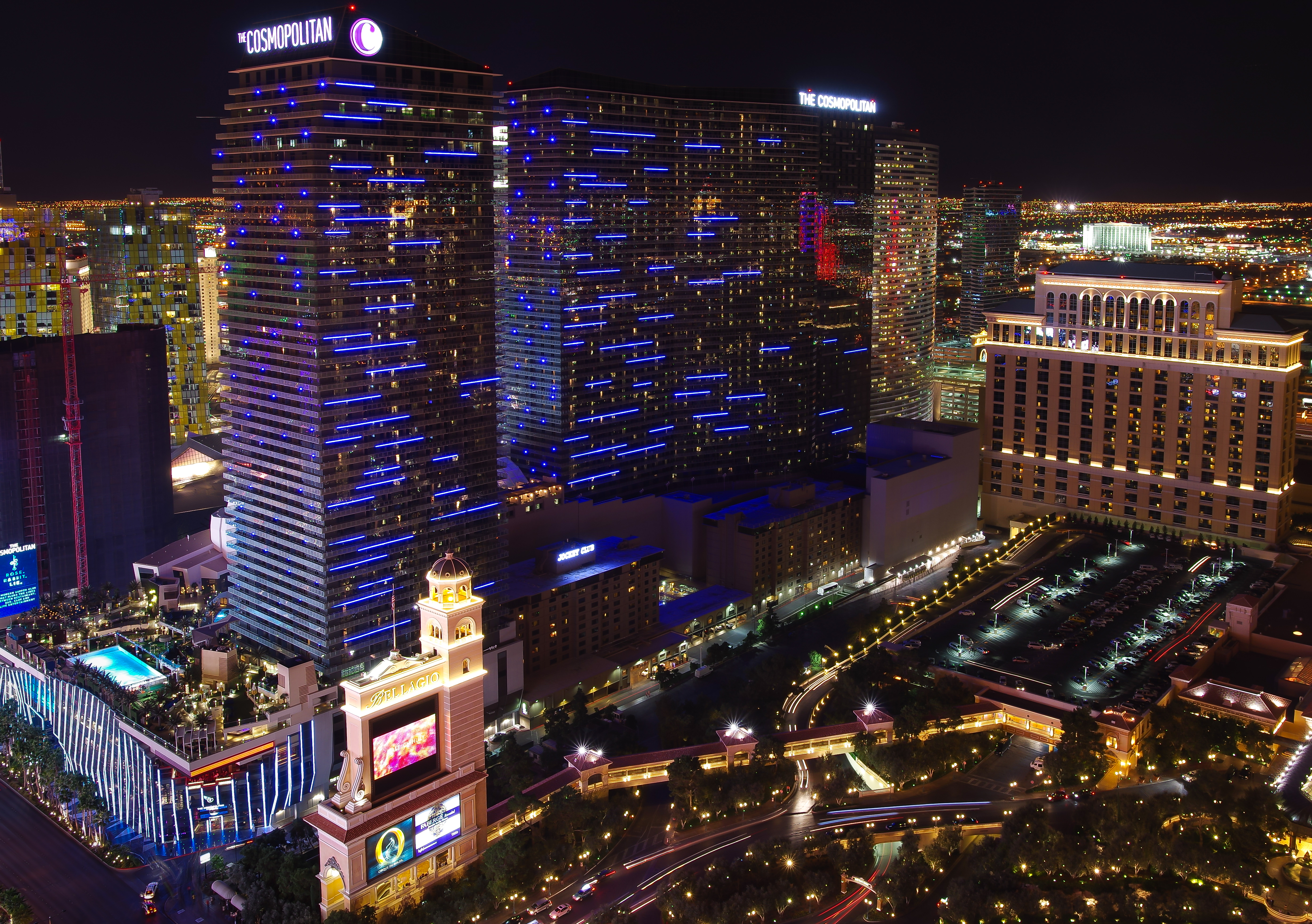
Night view

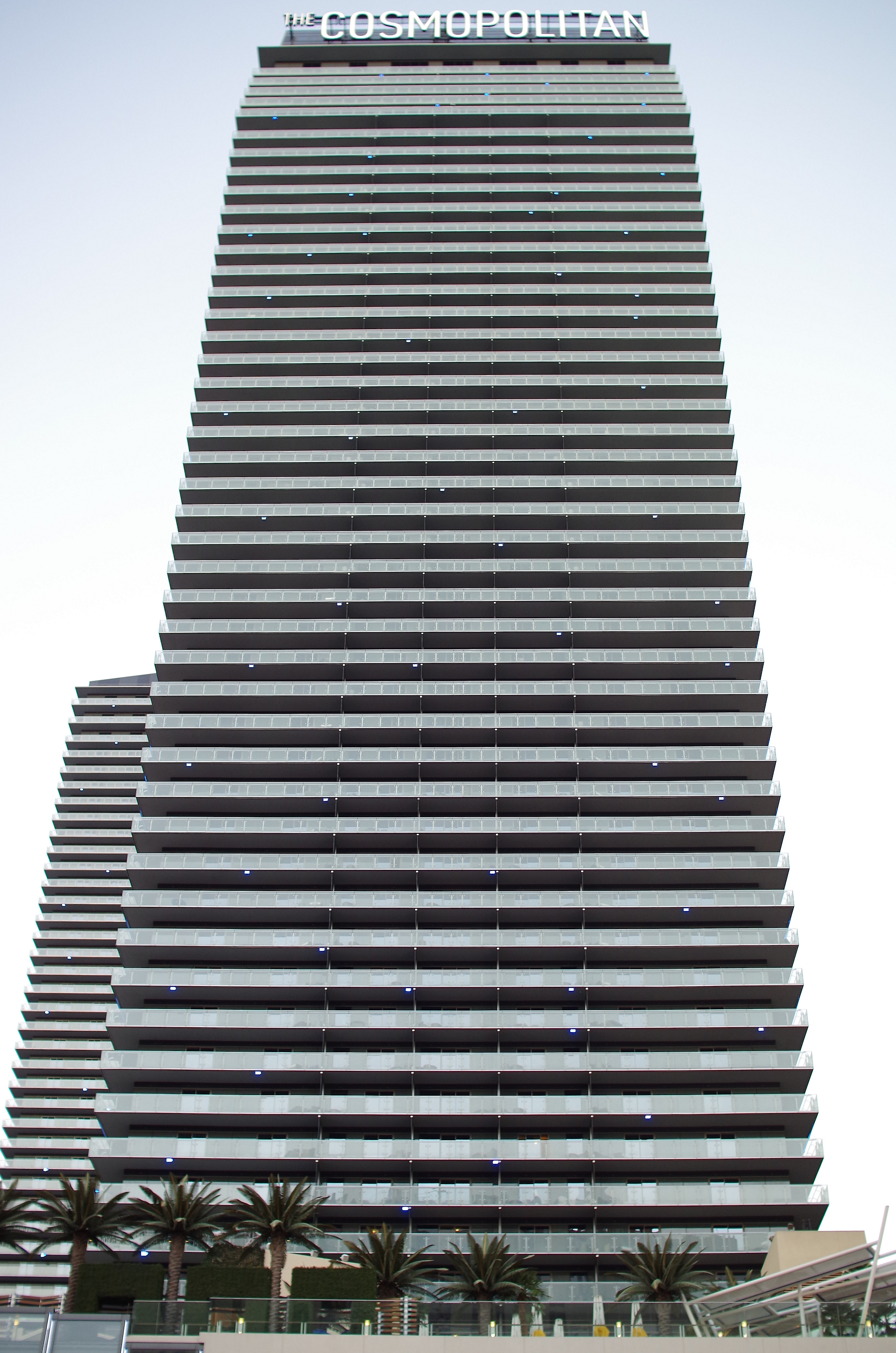
Front of the Boulevard Tower

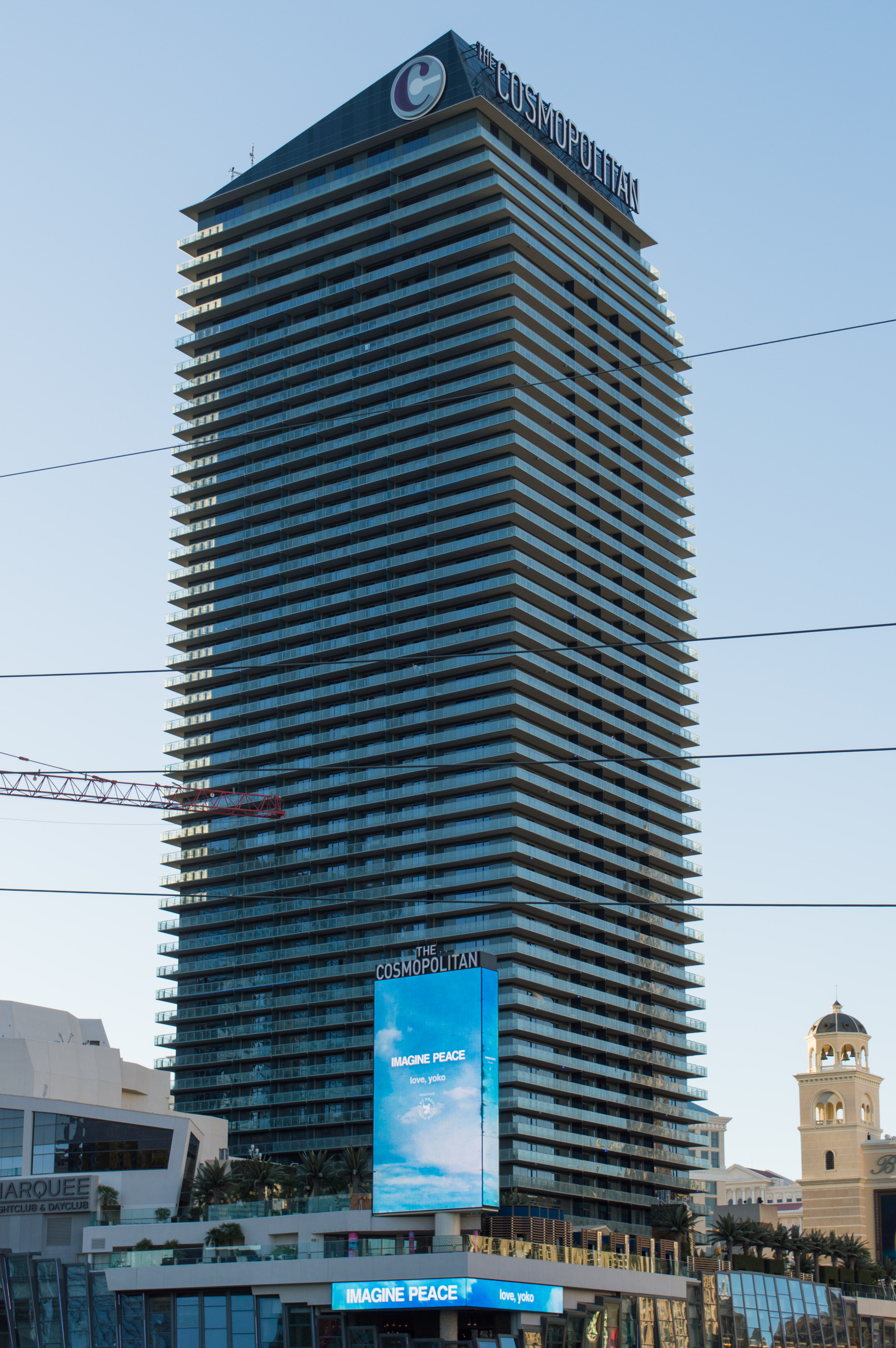
The Boulevard Tower from the Strip

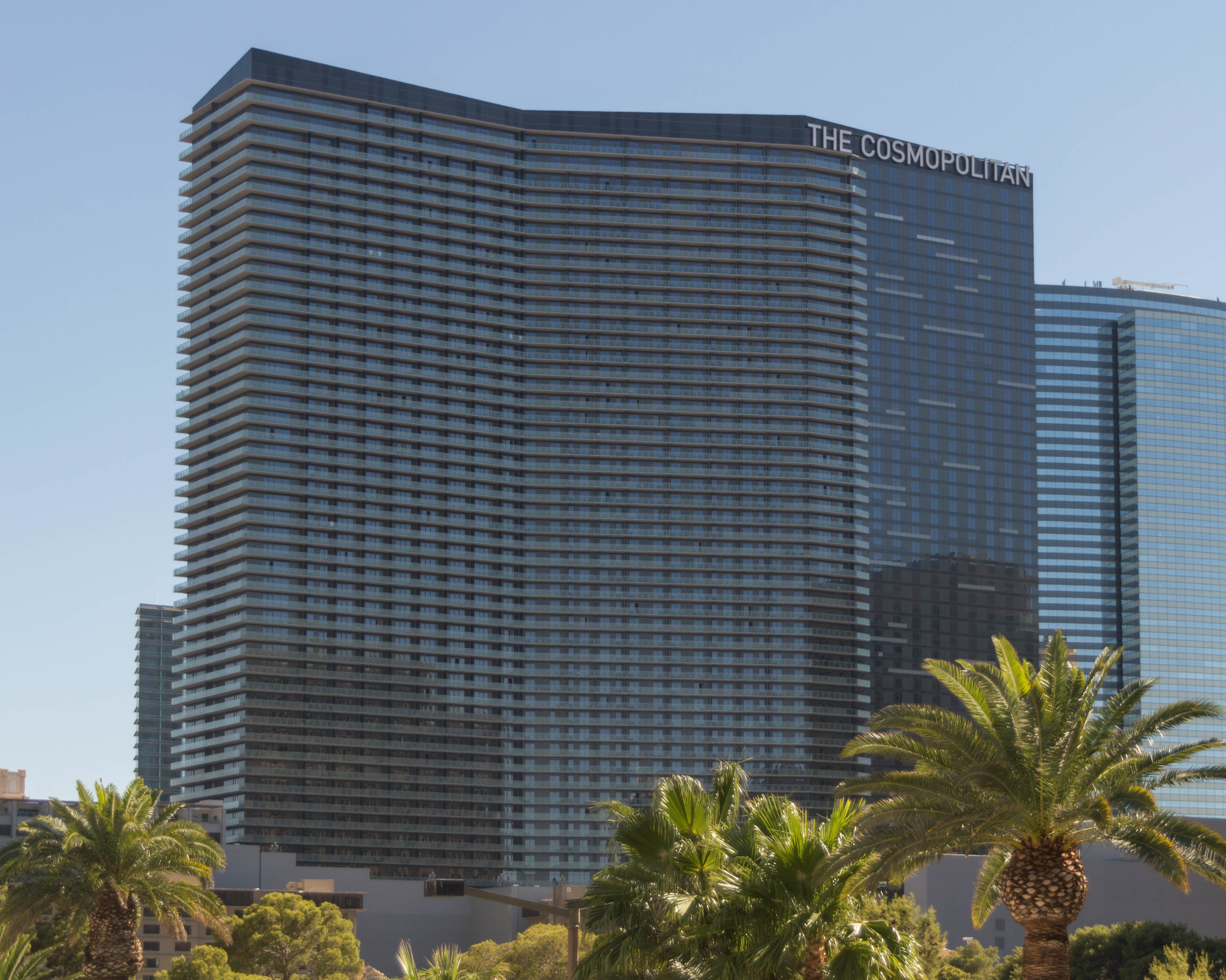
The Chelsea Tower

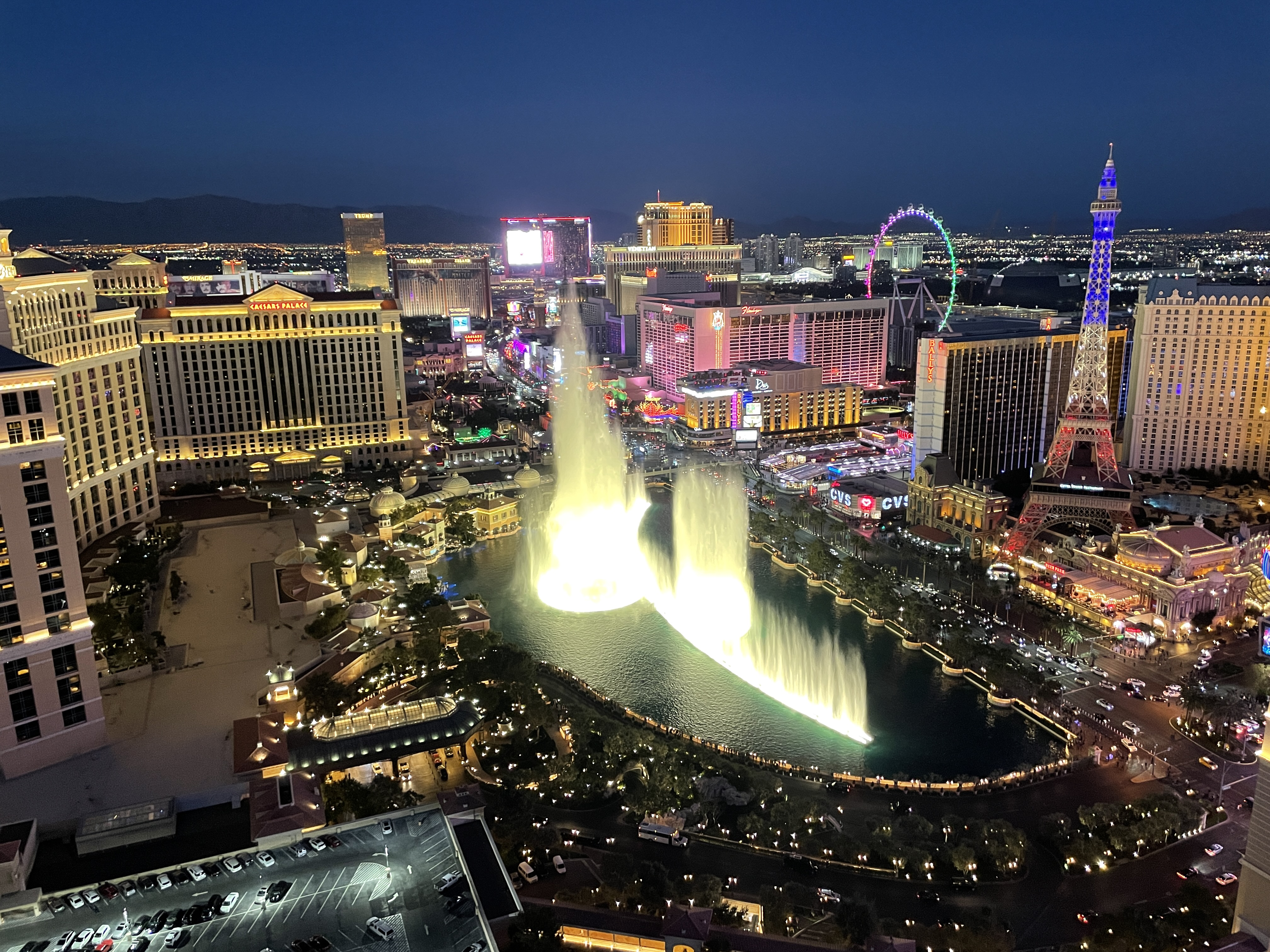
View of the Strip from a room balcony at the Cosmopolitan

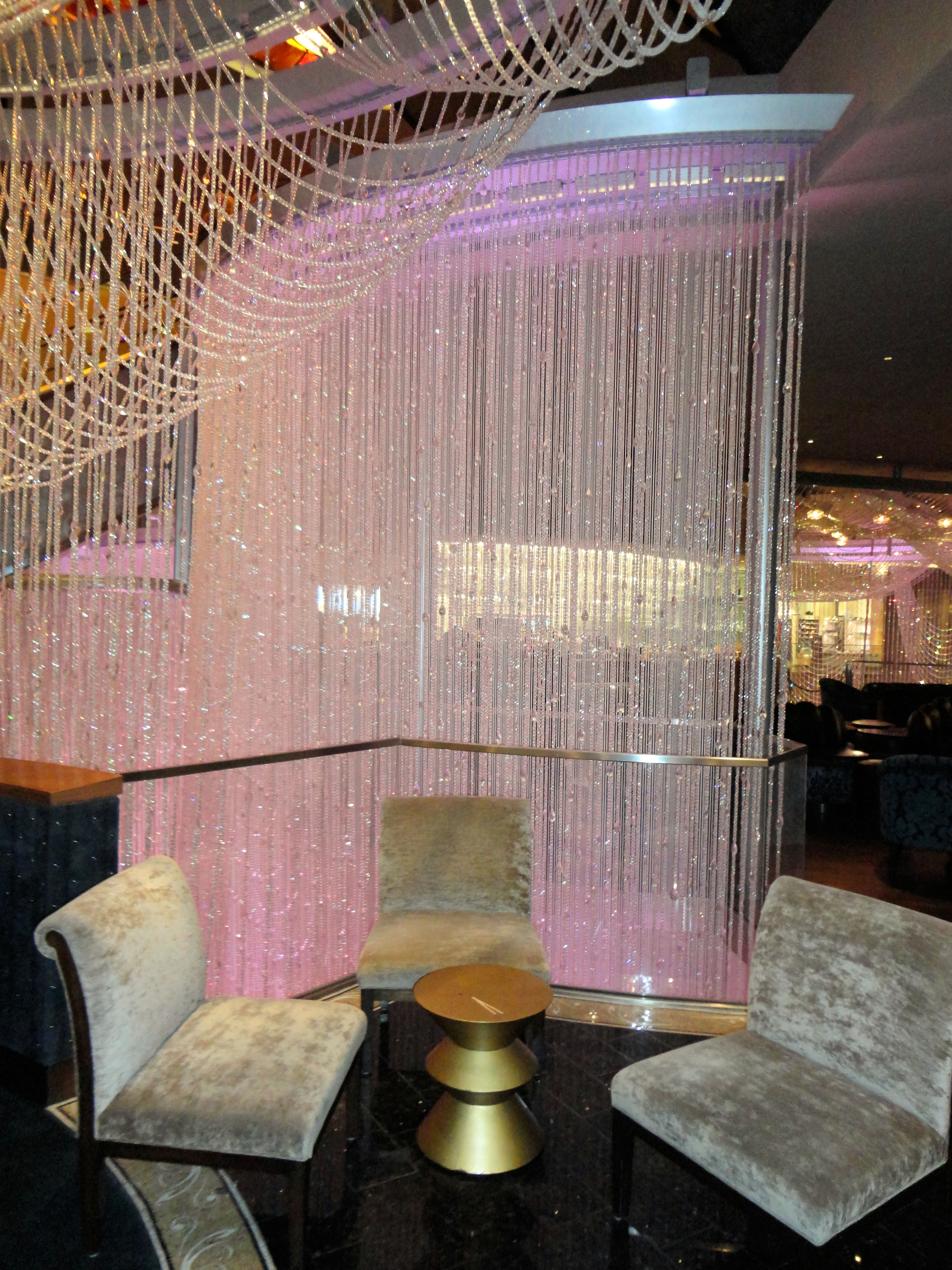
Inside the Chandelier lounge, 2011

== See also ==
- List of tallest buildings in Las Vegas
- List of largest hotels
- List of integrated resorts
