= Cosmopolitan Hotel Tribeca =

Hotel in Manhattan, New York

Coordinates: 40°42′56″N 74°00′32″W

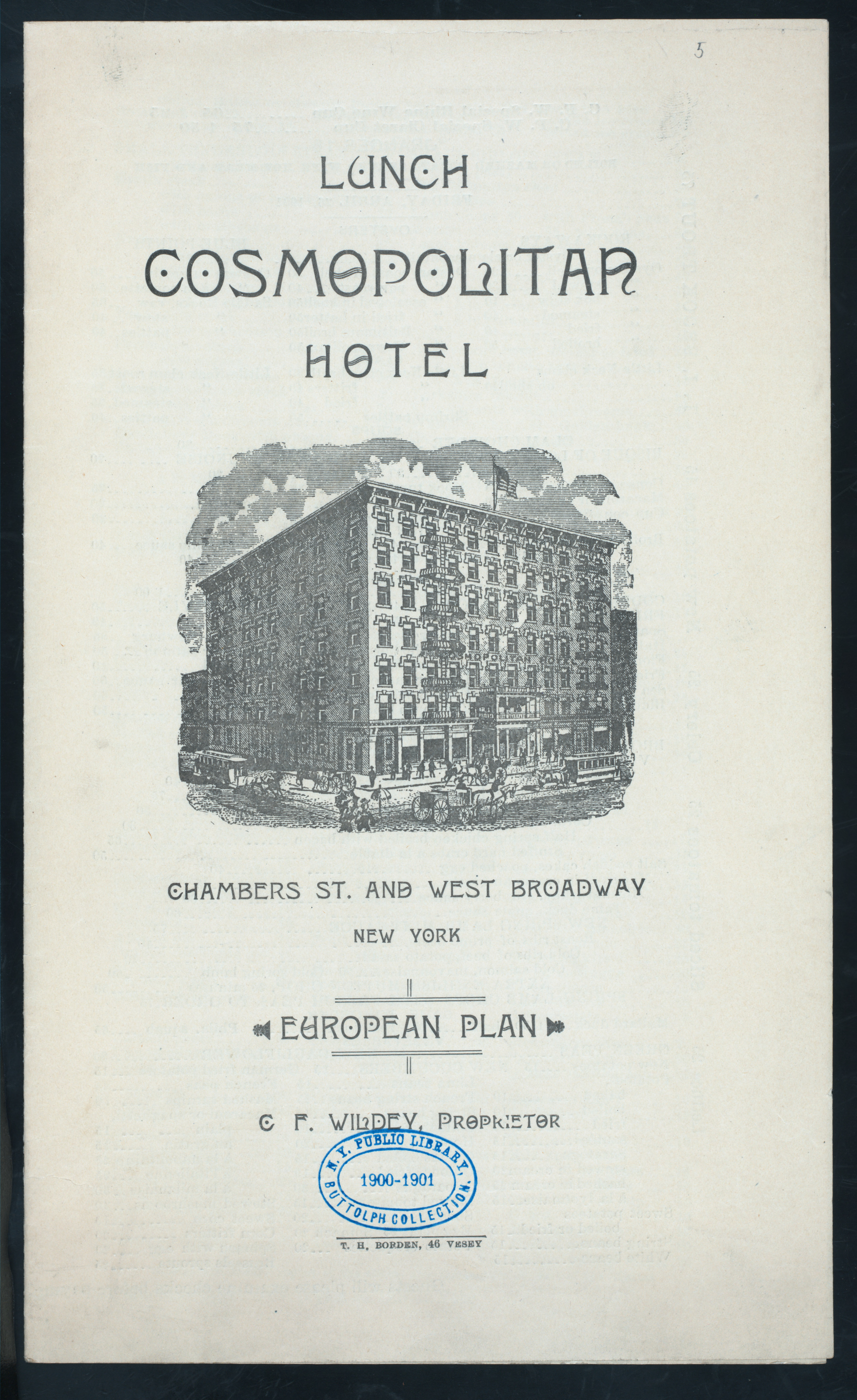
Lunch menu, 1901

The Frederick Hotel, previously the Cosmopolitan Hotel Tribeca, is a historic hotel located at 95 West Broadway in the Tribeca neighborhood of Manhattan in New York City. The building was built in 1844–45 by a tobacco merchant James Boorman. Early on it was called the Girard House and it was renamed the Cosmopolitan in the 1860s. It was originally located across from the southern depot of the Hudson River Railroad.

The building is part of the Tribeca South Historic District. It contains Gothic elements as well as an Edwardian rooftop and an Art Deco storefront. Over the years the building has been substantially modified. The interior has been entirely redone. The original red brick was painted beige in the late 19th century. A seventh floor was added in 1989.
