= A Connecticut Yankee in King Arthur's Court =

1889 novel by Mark Twain

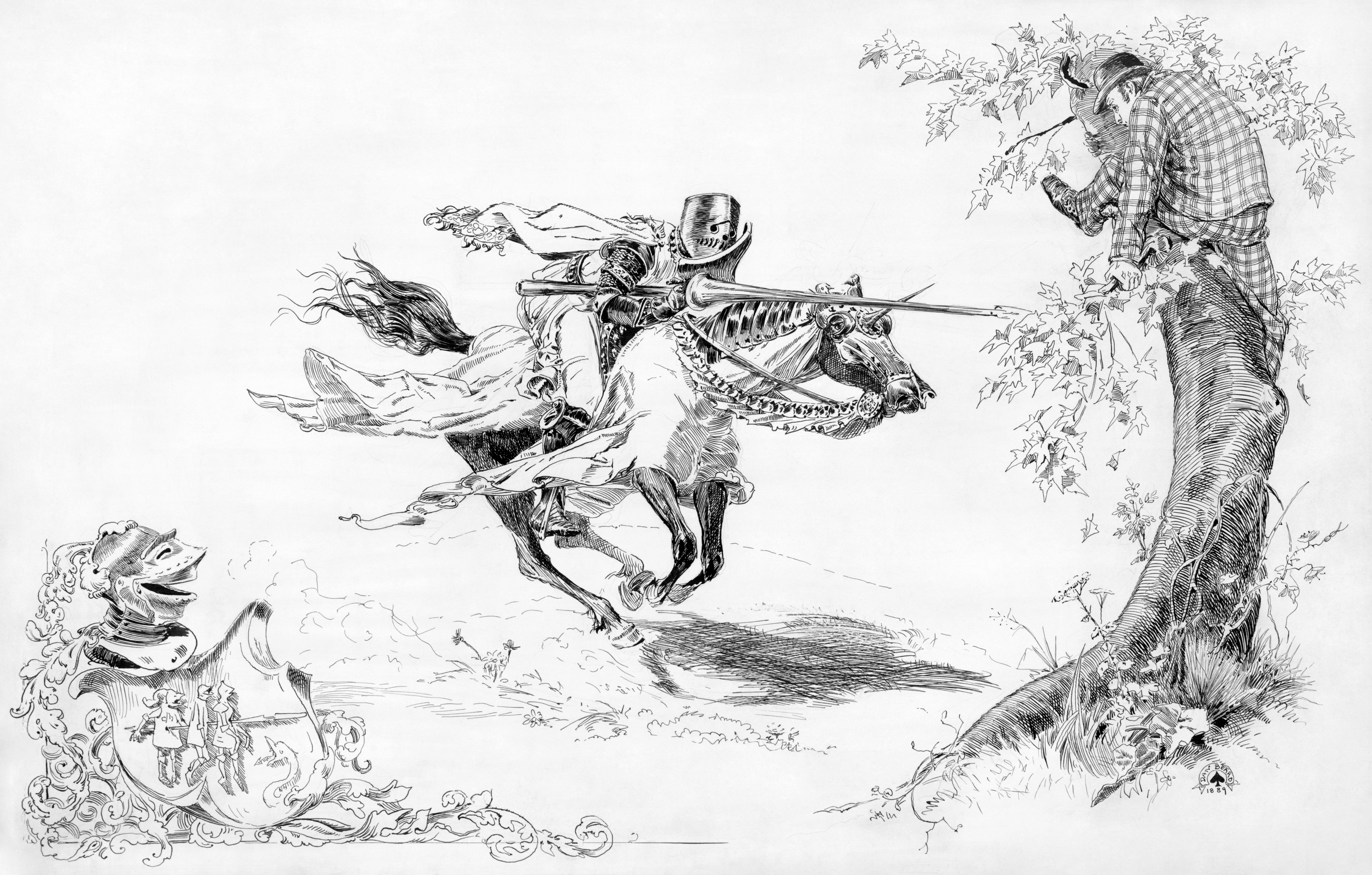
- 1889 frontispiece by Daniel Carter Beard, restored
- Author: Mark Twain
- Language: English
- Genre: Alternate history, Science fiction, fantasy
- Published: 1889 (Charles L. Webster and Co.)
- Publication place: United States
- Text: A Connecticut Yankee in King Arthur's Court at Wikisource

A Connecticut Yankee in King Arthur's Court is an 1889 historical novel by American humorist and writer Mark Twain. The book was originally titled A Yankee in King Arthur's Court. Some early editions are titled A Yankee at the Court of King Arthur.

In the book, a Yankee engineer from Connecticut named Hank Morgan receives a severe blow to the head and is somehow transported in time and space to England during the reign of King Arthur. After some initial confusion and his capture by one of Arthur's knights, Hank realizes that he is actually in the past, and he uses his knowledge to make people believe that he is a powerful magician. He becomes a rival of Merlin, who appears to be little more than a fraud, and gains the trust of King Arthur. Hank attempts to modernize the past in order to make people's lives better. Hank is disgusted by how the Barons treat the commoners and tries to implement democratic reforms, but in the end, he is unable to prevent the death of Arthur. Hank declares England a republic, but the Catholic Church, growing fearful of his wealth and power, issues an interdict against him.

Twain wrote the book as a burlesque of Romantic notions of chivalry after being inspired by a dream in which he was a knight himself, severely inconvenienced by the weight and cumbersome nature of his armor. It is a satire of feudalism and monarchy that also celebrates homespun ingenuity and democratic values while questioning the for-profit ideals of capitalism and outcomes of the Industrial Revolution. Twain strongly praises the French Revolution, defending the Reign of Terror as a minor problem compared to the monarchy. It is among several works by Twain and his contemporaries that mark the transition from the Gilded Age to the Progressive Era of socioeconomic discourse. It is often cited as a formative example of the fledgling time travel genre.

== Plot ==
Hank Morgan, a 19th-century resident of East Hartford, Connecticut, after a blow to the head, awakens to find himself inexplicably transported back in time to early medieval England, where he meets King Arthur.

Many passages are quoted directly from Sir Thomas Malory's Le Morte d'Arthur, a late medieval collection of Arthurian legends that constitutes one of the main sources on the myth of King Arthur and Camelot. The frame narrator is a 19th-century man (ostensibly Mark Twain himself) who meets Hank Morgan in modern times and begins reading Hank's book in the museum in which they meet. Later, characters in the story retell parts of it in Malory's original language. A chapter on medieval hermits also draws from the work of William Edward Hartpole Lecky.

=== Introduction to the "stranger" ===
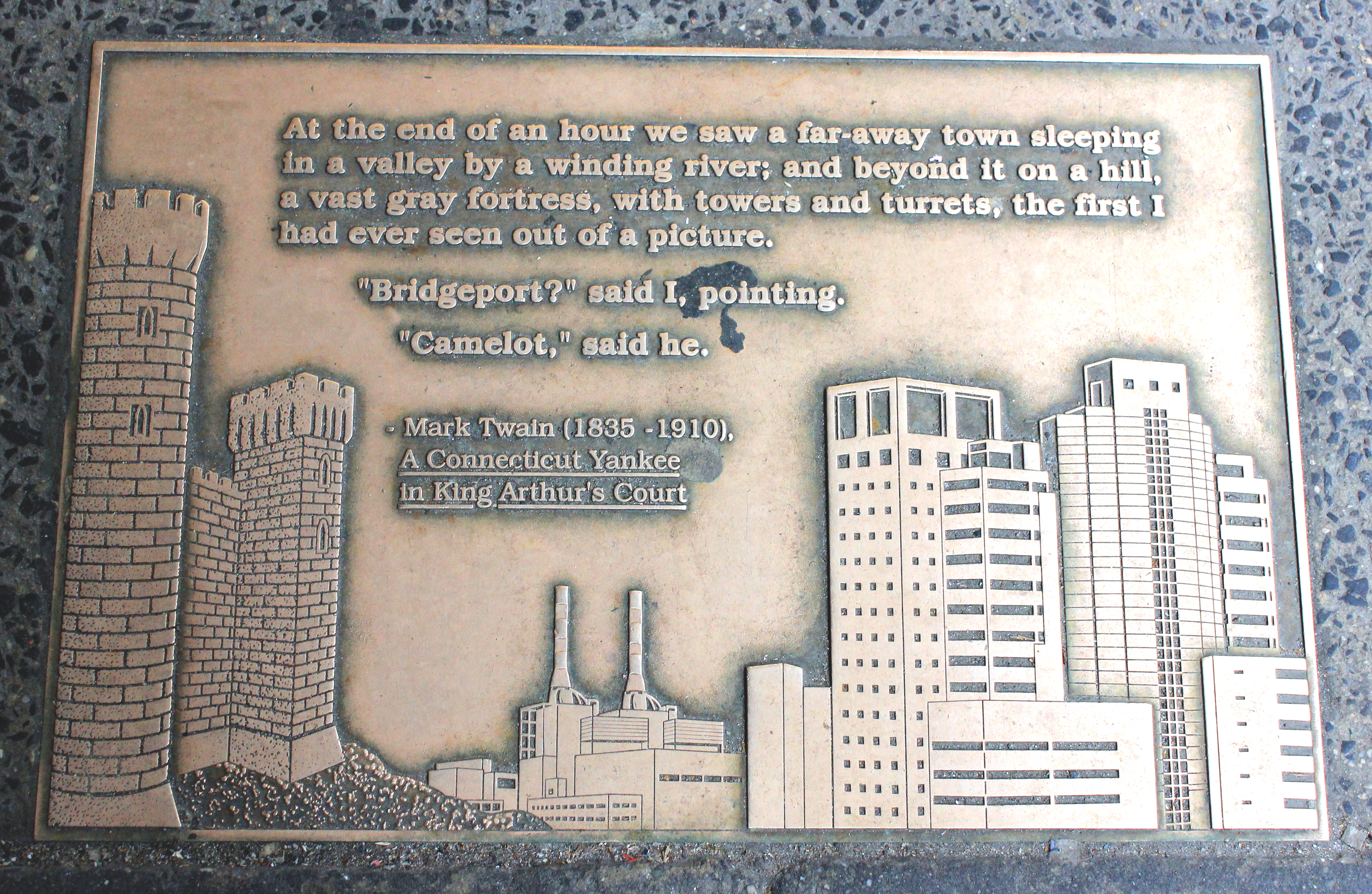
"'Bridgeport?' said I, pointing. 'Camelot', said he."

The story begins as a first-person narrative in Warwick Castle, where a man details his recollection of a tale told to him by an "interested stranger" personified as a knight through his simple language and familiarity with ancient armor.

After a brief tale of Sir Lancelot of Camelot and his role in slaying two giants from the third-person narrative, taken directly from Le Morte d'Arthur, Hank Morgan enters and is persuaded to reveal more of his story. Hank is a superintendent because of his proficiency in firearms manufacturing, with 2,000 subordinates. During a disagreement with his subordinates, he sustains a head injury when a man named "Hercules" hits him with a crowbar.

Hank wakes up underneath an oak tree, having no idea how he got there. Hank soon encounters the knight Sir Kay. Kay challenges him to a joust, which is quickly lost by the unarmed, unarmored Hank as he scuttles up a tree. Kay captures Hank and leads him towards Camelot Castle. Upon recognizing that he has traveled back to the 6th century, Hank realizes that he is the de facto smartest person on Earth and that with his knowledge, he should soon be running things.

Hank is ridiculed at Arthur's court for his strange appearance and dress, most vehemently by Merlin, and is sentenced to burn at the stake on June 21. By a stroke of luck, the date coincides with a historical solar eclipse in 528, of which Hank had learned in his earlier life. In prison, he sends a boy he christens Clarence (whose real name is Amyas le Poulet) to inform the king that he will blot out the sun if he is executed. Hank believes it is June 20; however, it is actually the 21st when he makes his threat, the day that the eclipse will occur at 12:03 p.m. When the king decides to let him burn, the eclipse catches Hank by surprise. However, he quickly convinces the people that he caused it. He makes a bargain with the king, is released, and becomes the second most powerful person in the kingdom. (Twain may have drawn inspiration from a historical incident in which Christopher Columbus exploited foreknowledge of a lunar eclipse.)

Hank is given the position of principal minister to the king and treated by all with the utmost fear and awe. He proclaims that his only income will be taken as a percentage of any increase in the kingdom's gross national product, from his efforts as Arthur's chief minister.

=== The takeover ===
Hank learns about medieval practices and superstitions. With his superior knowledge, he is able to outdo alleged sorcerers and miracle-working church officials. Soon after the eclipse, people begin gathering, hoping to see Hank perform another miracle. Merlin, jealous of Hank having replaced him as both the king's principal adviser and the most powerful sorcerer of the realm, begins spreading rumors that Hank is a fake. Hank secretly manufactures gunpowder and a lightning rod, plants explosive charges in Merlin's tower, places the lightning rod at the top, and runs a wire to the explosive charges. He then announces that he will soon call down fire from heaven and destroy Merlin's tower, challenging Merlin to use his sorcery to prevent it. Lightning strikes the rod, triggering the explosive charges and leveling the tower, further diminishing Merlin's reputation.

Hank uses his authority and knowledge to industrialize the country behind the backs of the ruling class. His assistant is Clarence, whom he educates, gradually lets in on most of his secrets, and eventually comes to rely on heavily. Hank sets up schools to teach 19th-century ideas and modern English, thereby removing the new generation from the stricture of medieval life, and constructs hidden factories to produce modern tools and weapons. He carefully selects the individuals he allows to enter his factories and schools. His followers refer to him as Boss and it's by this moniker he chooses to go by for much of the story.

As Hank gradually adjusts, he begins to attend medieval tournaments. A misunderstanding causes Sir Sagramore to challenge him to a duel to the death. The combat is to take place when Sagramore returns from his quest for the Holy Grail. Hank accepts. He undertakes an adventure with a wandering girl named the Demoiselle Alisande a la Carteloise, nicknamed "Sandy" by Hank, to save her royal "mistresses" held captive by ogres. On the way, Hank encounters Morgan le Fay. The "princesses", "ogres", and "castles" are all revealed to actually be pigs owned by peasant swineherds, but to Sandy, they still appear as royalty. Hank buys the pigs from the peasants, and the two depart for Camelot.

On the way, they find a traveling group of pilgrims headed for the Valley of Holiness. Another group of pilgrims, however, comes from that direction and bears the news that the valley's famous fountain has run dry. According to legend, long ago, the fountain had gone dry as soon as the monks of the valley's monastery built a bath with it. The bath was destroyed and the water instantly returned, but this time, it has stopped with no clear cause. Hank is begged to restore the fountain, although Merlin is already trying to do so. When Merlin fails, he claims that the fountain has been corrupted by a demon and that it will never flow again. Hank procures assistants from Camelot, who bring along a pump and fireworks. They repair the fountain and Hank "banishes" the demon. The fountain restored, Hank goes on to debunk another magician who claims to be able to tell what any person in the world is doing, including King Arthur. Hank knows via telephone that the king is riding out to see the restored fountain and not "resting from the chase" as the false prophet had claimed, and the king arrives in the valley just as Hank predicted.

Hank decides to travel among the poor disguised as a peasant to find out how they truly live. King Arthur joins him, but has extreme difficulty in acting like a peasant convincingly. Arthur becomes somewhat disillusioned by seeing for himself the standard of life of his subjects. The two encounter villagers in a minor fiefdom of Arthur's realm, where Arthur is taken as a madman when he makes several outlandish and erroneous comments about agriculture. Hank attempts to teach the villagers about a rudimentary value theory of wages that they rebuff and in his zeal to win the argument, accidentally acknowledges that a member of his audience overpaid a worker, a capital offense. The audience then forms a mob that chases Hank and Arthur down. They seem to be delivered from danger when a nobleman invites them into his entourage, but he enslaves them and sells them to another particularly ruthless enslaver, who takes them to London.

Hank steals a piece of metal in London and uses it to create a makeshift lockpick. However, before he can free the king, a man enters their quarters in the dark. Mistaking him for the slave driver, Hank starts a fight with him. They are both arrested. Hank lies his way out, but in his absence, the real slave driver has discovered Hank's escape. Since Hank was the most valuable slave, he was due to be sold the next day. The man becomes enraged and begins beating his other slaves, who fight back and kill him. All the slaves, including the king, will be hanged as soon as Hank is found. Hank is captured, but he and Arthur are rescued by a party of knights led by Lancelot, riding bicycles. Then, the king becomes extremely bitter against slavery and vows to abolish it when they get free, much to Hank's delight.

Sagramore returns from his quest and fights Hank, who defeats him and seven others, including Galahad and Lancelot, using a lasso. When Merlin steals Hank's lasso, Sagramore returns to challenge him again. This time, Hank kills him with a revolver. He proceeds to challenge the knights of Britain to attack him en masse, which they do. After he kills nine more knights with his revolvers, the rest break and flee. The next day, Hank reveals his 19th-century infrastructure to the country.

=== Interdict ===
Three years later, Hank has married Sandy, and they have a baby. In Hank's absence, Sandy chooses to name the baby after what she believes to be the name of her husband's lost beloved whose name he would say in his sleep. Unbeknownst to her, his American love was a telephone operator and Sandy named their baby after how Hank would greet her, "Hello, Central!". When Hello-Central falls critically ill, Hank's doctors advise him to take his family overseas while the baby recovers. In reality, it is a ploy by the Catholic Church to get Hank out of the country. During the weeks that Hank is absent, Arthur discovers Guinevere's infidelity with Lancelot. That causes a war between Lancelot and Arthur, who is eventually killed by Sir Mordred.

The Church then places the land under interdict, causing the people to revolt against Hank. Hank sees that something is wrong and returns to Britain. Clarence informs him of the war. As time goes on, Clarence gathers 52 teenage cadets, who are to fight against all of Britain. Hank's band fortifies itself in Merlin's Cave with a minefield, electric wire, and Gatling guns. The Church sends an army of 30,000 knights to attack them, but they are slaughtered by the cadets.

However, Hank's men are now trapped in the cave by a wall of dead bodies and sickened by the miasma bred by thousands of corpses. Hank attempts to offer aid to any wounded but is stabbed by the first wounded man he tries to help, Sir Meliagraunce. He is not seriously injured but is bedridden. Disease begins to set in. One night, Clarence finds Merlin weaving a spell over Hank, proclaiming that he will sleep for 1,300 years. Merlin begins laughing deliriously but ends up electrocuting himself on one of the electric wires. Clarence and the others all apparently die from disease in the cave.

More than a millennium later, the narrator finishes the manuscript and finds Hank on his deathbed and dreaming about Sandy. He attempts to make one last "effect" but dies before he can finish it.

== Genesis, composition, and contemporary critical response ==
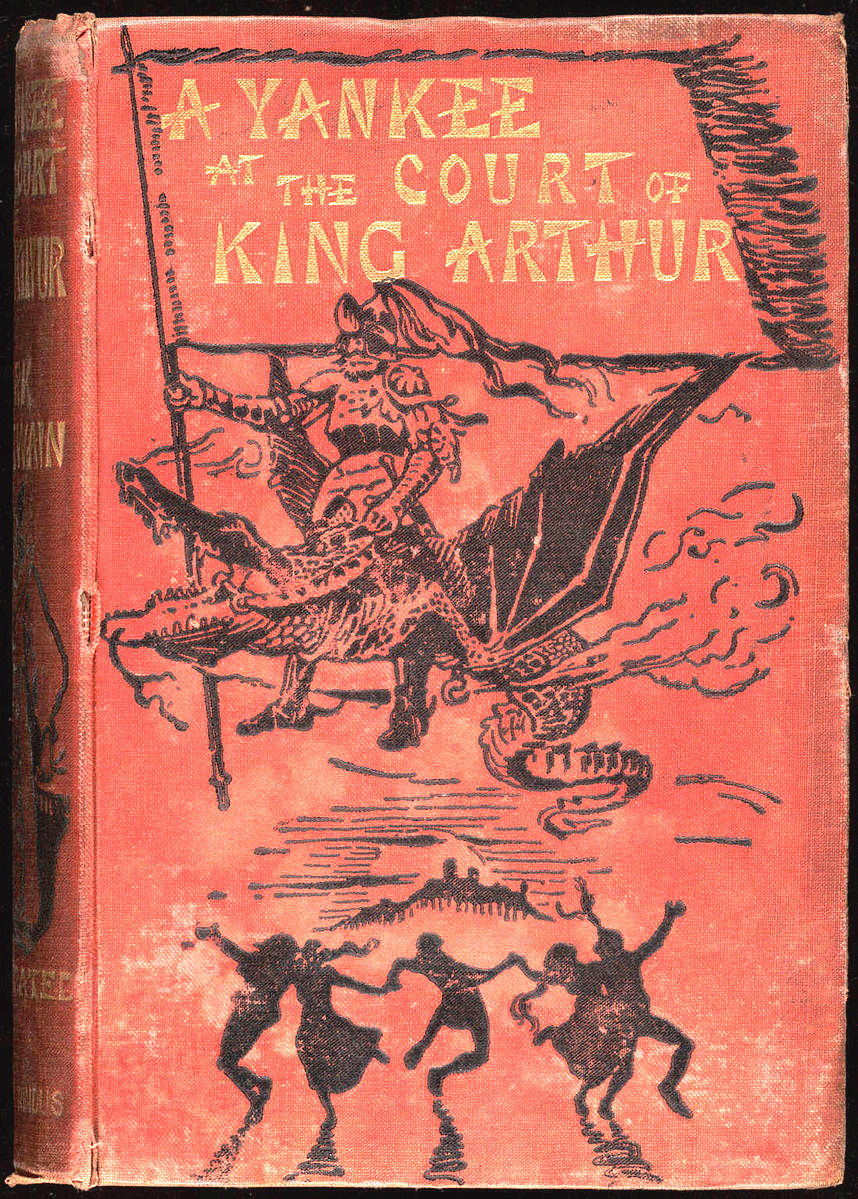
First English edition, 1889

Twain's first encounter with the Morte d'Arthur occurred in 1880, when someone in his household bought Sidney Lanier's bowdlerized edition, The Boy's King Arthur. Whether he read this children's version or not is not known. However, he certainly read the unexpurgated work after his close friend George Washington Cable recommended it to him in November 1884. The pair were traveling on the lecture circuit as the "Twins of Genius" during the winter of 1884–1885 when Cable spotted the Morte on the front table of a Rochester, New York, bookstore that both were perusing. Cable pointed to the volume and said, "You will never lay it down until you have read it cover to cover." Twain bought this copy and read it in nearly one sitting during a train ride to their next lecture date. After his own book's great success, Twain credited Cable for his inspiration, referring to him as "the Godfather of my book".

Soon thereafter, in December 1884, Twain conceived of the idea behind A Connecticut Yankee in King Arthur's Court and worked on its realization between 1885 and 1889. The bulk of its composition was done at Twain's summer home at Elmira, New York, and was completed in Hartford, Connecticut. It was first published in England by Chatto & Windus under the title A Yankee at the Court of King Arthur in December 1889.

Writer and critic William Dean Howells called it Twain's best work and "an object-lesson in democracy". The work was met with some indignation in Great Britain, where it was perceived as "a direct attack on [its] hereditary and aristocratic institutions".

== Analysis ==
The book pokes fun at contemporary society, but the main thrust is a satire of romanticized ideas of chivalry and the idealization of the Middle Ages common in the novels of Sir Walter Scott and other 19th-century literature. Twain had a particular dislike for Scott, blaming his kind of romanticizing of battle for the Southern states' deciding to fight the American Civil War. He writes in Life on the Mississippi:

It was Sir Walter that made every gentleman in the South a Major or a Colonel, or a General or a Judge, before the war; and it was he, also, that made these gentlemen value these bogus decorations. For it was he that created rank and caste down there, and also reverence for rank and caste, and pride and pleasure in them. [...] Sir Walter had so large a hand in making Southern character, as it existed before the war, that he is in great measure responsible for the war.

— Mark Twain, Life on the Mississippi.

For example, the book portrays the medieval people as being very gullible, as when Merlin makes a "veil of invisibility" that, according to him, will make the wearer imperceptible to his enemies, though friends can still see him. The knight Sir Sagramor wears it to fight Hank, who pretends that he cannot see Sagramor for effect to the audience.

Hank Morgan's opinions are also strongly denunciatory toward the Catholic Church of the medieval period; the Church is seen by the Yankee as an oppressive institution that stifles science and teaches peasants meekness only as a means of preventing the overthrow of Church rule and taxation. The book also contains many depictions and condemnations of the dangers of superstition and the horrors of slavery.

The book provides evidence of Twain's growing interest in Georgist economics and social theory. This is particularly evident in the interpretative illustrations by Georgist activist Daniel Carter Beard. Twain approved each illustration, and the editors of The Mark Twain Encyclopedia considered the illustrations an essential part of the work.

George Orwell strongly disapproved of the book: "[Twain] squandered his time on boffooneries [such as] A Connecticut Yankee in King Arthur's Court, which is a deliberate flattery of all that is worst and most vulgar in American Life" (e.g., the various American inventions and institutions Hank Morgan introduces into sixth-century Britain and whose excellence and superiority are taken for granted).

It is possible to see the book as an important transitional work for Twain in that earlier, sunnier passages recall the frontier humor of his tall tales such as The Celebrated Jumping Frog of Calaveras County, while the corrosive view of human behavior in the apocalyptic latter chapters is more akin to darker, later Twain works such as The Mysterious Stranger and Letters from the Earth.

One frequently overlooked aspect of the book is the emotional intensity felt by Hank toward his family: wife Sandy and baby Hello-Central. Twain's own son, Langdon, died of diphtheria at the age of 19 months, which was likely reflected in Hello-Central's membranous croup. Twain also outlived two of his three daughters, but they both died after the completion of the book. The last chapters of the book are full of Hank's pronouncements of love, culminating in his final delirium, where "an abyss of thirteen centuries yawning between me and you!" is worse than death.

== As science fiction ==
While Connecticut Yankee is sometimes credited as the foundational work in the time travel subgenre of science fiction, Twain's novel had several important immediate predecessors. Among them are H. G. Wells's story "The Chronic Argonauts" (1888), which was a precursor to The Time Machine (1895). Also published the year before Connecticut Yankee was Edward Bellamy's wildly popular Looking Backward (1888), in which the protagonist is put into a hypnosis-induced sleep and wakes up in the year 2000. Yet another American novel that could have served as a more direct inspiration to Twain was The Fortunate Island (1882) by Charles Heber Clark. In this novel, a technically proficient American is shipwrecked on an island that broke off from Britain during Arthurian times and never developed any further.

Twain's book introduced what remains one of the main literary devices used in time travel literature—a modern person is suddenly hurled into the past by some force completely beyond the traveler's control, is stuck there irrevocably, and must make the best of it—typically by trying to introduce modern inventions and institutions into the past society. Several works considered classics of science fiction clearly follow on this pattern set by Twain, such as L. Sprague de Camp's Lest Darkness Fall and Poul Anderson's "The Man Who Came Early". This strand of time travel literature is clearly distinct from that following the basic pattern of Wells's works, where the protagonist is in possession of a time machine and is able to travel at will back and forth in time. The literary device continues to see use throughout modern science fiction, from popular American time travel stories such as Michael Crichton's Timeline to Japanese isekai like Handyman Saitō in Another World.

== Adaptations and references ==
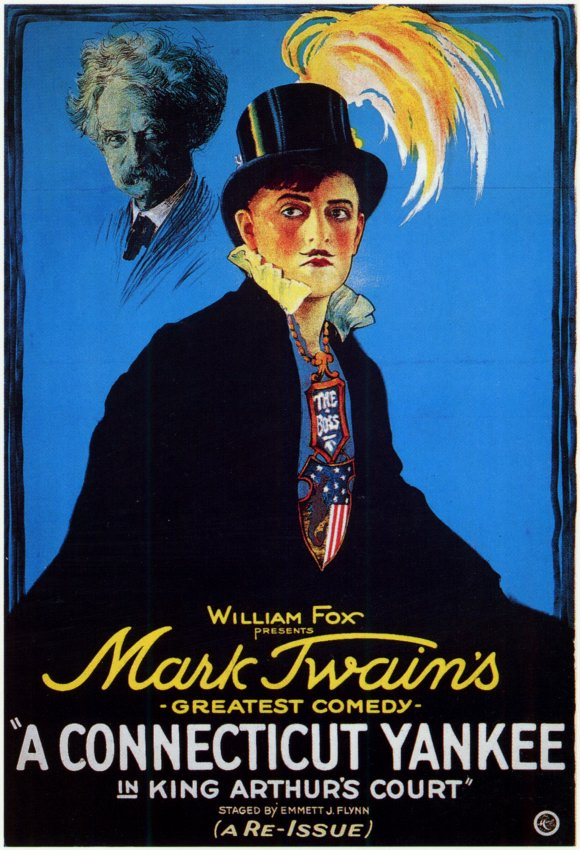
A Connecticut Yankee in King Arthur's Court (1921 film)

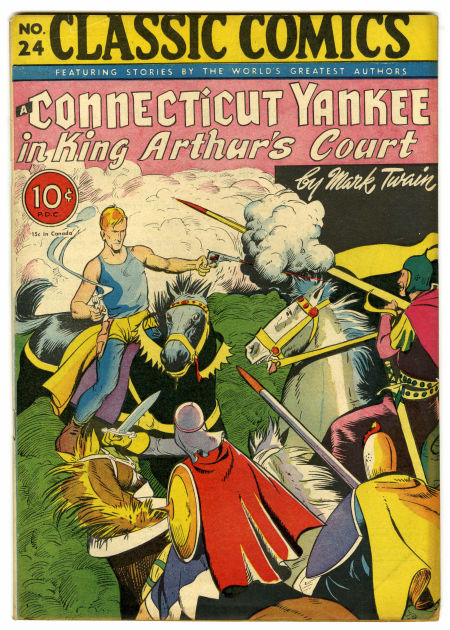
Comic book cover

Since the beginning of the 20th century, this famous story has been adapted many times for the stage, feature-length motion pictures, and animated cartoons.

- The earliest film version is Fox's 1921 silent version.
- In 1927, the novel was adapted into the musical A Connecticut Yankee by Richard Rodgers and Lorenz Hart.
- American comic artist Charles Forbell adapted the concept for his 1929 comic strip series Cuddles, an American Flapper at King Arthur's Court.
- A 1931 film, also called A Connecticut Yankee, stars Will Rogers.
- A Knight for a Day is a 1946 Disney short film starring Goofy that is loosely inspired by the novel.
- The story was adapted as an hour-long radio play on the October 5, 1947, broadcast of the Ford Theatre, starring Karl Swenson.
- A 1949 musical film features Bing Crosby and Rhonda Fleming, with music by Jimmy Van Heusen and Victor Young.
- In 1960, Tennessee Ernie Ford starred in a television adaptation.
- A 1966 episode of The Adventures of Superboy, the hero travelled back to King Arthur's Camelot and contended with Merlin and his Black Knight.
- In 1970, the book was adapted into a 74-minute animated TV special directed by Zoran Janjic, with Orson Bean as the voice of the title character.
- The 1976 Soviet animated film "The Mirror of Time" (Зеркало времени), features a segment which adapts a portion of the novel.
- A 1978 episode of Once Upon a Classic, "A Connecticut Yankee in King Arthur's Court", is an adaptation that stars Paul Rudd and Tovah Feldshuh, with Richard Basehart as Arthur and Roscoe Lee Browne as Merlin. This episode was released as a feature on VHS and laserdisc by MasterVision in 1987 with the cover title Mark Twain's A Connecticut Yankee... and later as a double-feature DVD with The Amazing Mr. Blunden. The DVD version, released by budget label East West DVD at a suggested retail price of $1, lacks the series intro and Bill Bixby's introduction.
- In 1979, Disney released the film Unidentified Flying Oddball, also known as A Spaceman in King Arthur's Court.
- 1979 also saw the Bugs Bunny special A Connecticut Rabbit in King Arthur's Court, described as being "plagiarized" by Chuck Jones.
- Season 2 of the TV series The Transformers features the episode "A Decepticon Raider in King Arthur's Court", which depicts a group of Autobots and Decepticons sent back to the Middle Ages.
- In 1987, Disney even paid homage to the story in a first-season episode of DuckTales ("Sir Gyro de Gearloose"), in which Gyro builds a time machine and flees the modern age for the time of King Arthur, taking Huey, Dewey, and Louie along for the adventure.
- In 1988, the Soviet variation called New Adventures of a Yankee in King Arthur's Court appeared.
- It was adapted into a 1989 television film by Paul Zindel and starring Keshia Knight Pulliam and René Auberjonois.
- The television series MacGyver includes a two-part adaptation ("Good Knight MacGyver", season 7, episodes 7 & 8, 1991) in which a modern-day engineer is transported to Arthur's court, where he uses his "magic" (science) to assist Merlin and save the king from a deadly plot.
- A 1992 cartoon series, King Arthur & the Knights of Justice, could also be seen as deriving inspiration from the novel.
- In 1995, Walt Disney Studios adapted the book into the feature film A Kid in King Arthur's Court.
- Also in 1995, Philippe Ross played a transported high schooler in A Young Connecticut Yankee in King Arthur's Court, with Michael York as Merlin.
- Terry Pratchett's 1995 short story "Once and Future" tells a similar story of a time-traveler, Mervin, stranded in a pre-Arthurian "Avalon" who refers to himself as being like "the Connecticut Yankee".
- In 1998, Disney made another adaptation with Whoopi Goldberg in A Knight in Camelot.
- The 2001 film Black Knight similarly transports a modern-day American to medieval England (not in the time of King Arthur but in the year 1328) while adding a racial element to the time-traveler plot line.

Several independent films produced during the 1990s drew inspiration from the novel, such as Army of Darkness (1992) and the fourth and fifth entries in the Trancers series.

In the Carl Sagan novel Contact, the protagonist, Eleanor Arroway, is reading A Connecticut Yankee in King Arthur's Court, specifically the scene where Hank first approaches Camelot, when she finds out about her father's death. The quotation "'Bridgeport?' Said I. 'Camelot,' Said he" is also used later in the book, and the story is used as a metaphor for contact between civilizations at very different levels of technological and ethical advancement.

The fifth season of TV series Once Upon a Time features Hank Morgan. He is introduced in the episode "Dreamcatcher" as Sir Morgan, a widower with a teenage daughter, Violet, living in a Camelot that exists in a magical reality. Violet becomes a love interest for main character Henry Mills. Morgan does not appear on-screen again but is mentioned in later episodes. He and Violet, along with other Camelot residents, are transported to Storybrooke in the "real" world. When most of Arthur's court returns to Camelot, Violet informs Henry that she and her father will stay in Storybrooke since her father is originally from Connecticut in the same world. A tie-in novel, Henry and Violet, confirms other details consistent with Twain's novel, such as Hank leaving Connecticut in the year 1889.

In the Chronicles of the Imaginarium Geographica series by James A. Owen, Hank appears in several books as a time-traveling "Messenger" recruited by Mark Twain. Hank is able to travel through time and space at will using an enchanted pocket watch, which eventually suffers a malfunction that strands him in the time stream. (Sandy and Hello-Central are not mentioned in the series.)

== See also ==
- 1889 in science fiction
- Black Knight
- A Dream of John Ball (1888) by William Morris
- List of films based on Arthurian legend
- Mark Twain bibliography
