= Ty Miller =

American actor (born 1964)

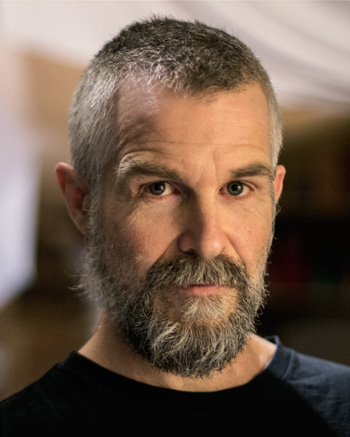
- Portrait of Ty Miller (2015)
- Born: Ty Wesley Miller; September 26, 1964 (age 61); Granada Hills, California, U.S.
- Occupation: Actor

Ty Wesley Miller (born September 26, 1964) is an American actor, probably best known for his role as The Kid on The Young Riders, which ran for three seasons. He has guest-starred on such series as The X-Files, Growing Pains, Melrose Place, Highway to Heaven, General Hospital, and more recently Without a Trace (in a recurring role) and Nip/Tuck. He has also starred in several movies, including To My Daughter and U.S. Seals, as well as the Full Moon-classics Trancers 4 and Trancers 5, where he played a renegade trancer trying to gain the trust of Jack Deth.

Miller has a bachelor's degree in business from the University of Southern California. He started acting at age 18.
