= Evil Obsession =

- Directed by: Richard W. Munchkin
- Written by: Tom Constantine
- Produced by: Aron Schifman, Richard W. Munchkin
- Starring: Corey Feldman, Kimberly Stevens, Mark Derwin
- Cinematography: Michael Goi
- Edited by: Tony Mark
- Music by: Robert O. Ragland
- Production company: Century Film Partners Inc.
- Release date: 1 February 1997 (U.S.)
- Running time: 95 minutes
- Country: United States
- Language: English

Evil Obsession (a.k.a. Illegal Entry, U.K. title) is a 1997 erotic thriller film produced and directed by Richard W. Munchkin. The film stars Corey Feldman as a man obsessed with, and stalking model Kimberly Stevens, amidst a spate of serial murders of models.

== Plot ==
Homer Douglas (Corey Feldman) is obsessed with famous model Margo Johnson (Kimberly Stevens) to the point of having decorated his room with her pictures and sent her strange letters. He breaks into her home and watches her undress while hiding under her bed.

Worried about a rash of recent murders of her fellow models, Margo calls a private investigator Damon Thomas (Mark Derwin) to investigate the strange letters she's been receiving. He encourages her to continue with her daily routine. She attends her acting class, taught by auteur Stavinski (Brion James) who is demanding and perfectionist. Homer follows her into class and successfully auditions to become a student. However, he is forced to work with Samantha (Una Damon), a fellow student and model, because Margo already has an acting partner, her boyfriend Bill (Michael Phenicie). After witnessing the two have a violent argument, Homer finds Bill alone and severely beats him with a brick.

Damon quietly investigates Margo's friends and associates including her housekeeper Anita (Hannah Sussman), Samantha, and Stavinski's receptionist Liz (Stacie Randall), who is also a model. While attempting to speak to Stavinski, Damon causes Liz to interrupt one of Stavinski's private acting lessons. Furious, he humiliates her in front of another student & model (Lorelei Leslie).

The next day at the studio, they discover that Bill has been hospitalized with severe brain injuries from which he will never recover. Since Margo has lost her acting partner, she is paired with Homer. She invites him over to her house. In the meantime, Damon has been investigating Homer. The PI breaks into Homer's house to discover his collage of Margo pictures and crayons matching the ones used to write his letters to Margo. He arrives at her house to arrest Homer.

In prison, Homer is interrogated for the letters, and for the assault on Bill. However, it becomes clear that Homer is not the one who has been killing the models.

Later that night, Margo receives a call from the acting studio telling her to come over. It is revealed to have been a trap, and Margo is tied down to a table to be murdered in the same manner as the other models. Damon arrives just in time to shoot the mysterious assailant. They turn over the body to discover that it was Liz who was committing the murders. Homer is released from lockup.

== Cast ==
- Corey Feldman as Homer
- Kimberly Stevens as Margo
- Mark Derwin as Damon
- Brion James as Stavinski
- Stacie Randall as Liz
- Una Damon as Samantha
