= Kimberly Friedmutter =

American actress

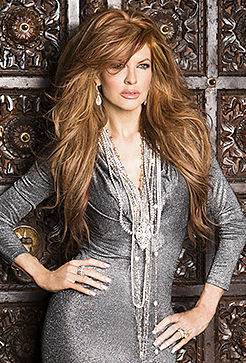
- Occupations: Author, Hypnotist, and Actress
- Notable work: Subconscious Power: Use Your Inner Mind to Create the Life You've Always Wanted
- Height: 5 ft 9 in (175 cm)
- Spouse(s): Charles Vallow (m. 1985; div. 1987); Brad Friedmutter (m. 2010)

Kimberly Friedmutter (formerly Stevens), is the author of the book Subconscious Power, a hypnotherapist and life-management expert, and the American actress and model best known for Evil Obsession, Time Under Fire, and the reality series Sin City Rules.

== Career ==
- From 1997-2003 she developed and hosted the radio talk program In the Heat of the Night on KLSX Los Angeles, the home of Howard Stern.
- From 2012-2013 she starred in the TLC reality series Sin City Rules.
- After developing, writing, and hosting a talk radio program on KLSX 97.1 FM Los Angeles, Kimberly has entered private practice as personal advisor in politics, sports and entertainment.
- In 2015 Kimberly joined the prestigious Board of UCLA Health Systems.
- In 2015, Kimberly coined the term "narsie" for the posting of selfies as a primal tool for social media.
- In 2018, Simon & Schuster announced that it acquired the rights to Friedmutter's first self-help book, under the Atria imprint Subconscious Power: Use Your Inner Mind to Create the Life You've Always Wanted, which was published in April 2019. Library Journal called it, "An enlightening read for those willing to dismiss cynicism for insight into self-sabotaging obstacles."
- Kimberly originated the word "spague," a portmanteau of "specific" and "vague," to describe a technique in language and writing that leaves one curious about the speaker's intention. A variation of this usage was first seen in a business article published in Forbes to describe the ability for one to be "specific yet vague, with just enough information to keep clients engaged."
- In 2019, the show How the Other Half Lives (UK), produced by Spun Gold TV, a BAFTA Award-winning production company, featured Kimberly's exceptional lifestyle and her book Subconscious Power.
- In October 2019, Kimberly accepted the honor of co-chair, with David and Jackie Siegel, of Victoria's Voice Foundation, an organization whose mission is to raise awareness about substance abuse and fight the opioid epidemic.
- In August 2022, Kimberly was honored as an esteemed Judge of the 2023 Mrs. American Pageant, preceding the Mrs. World Pageant, in Las Vegas, Nevada.

== Personal life ==
In 2009 Kimberly dated Baywatch star David Hasselhoff. She married Las Vegas-based architect Brad Friedmutter on October 23, 2010. Their wedding was officiated by the mayor of Las Vegas, Oscar Goodman. In 2010 the couple made a guest appearance on a Private Chefs of Beverly Hills episode A Very Brady Birthday.

In 2016 Kimberly appeared on Art Breakers (Ovation network) guest-starring as herself. In 2016 she also appeared on The Doctors TV show (CBS).

She is currently a Celebrity Hypnotist and Life Management Expert, and a financial supporter of the Opportunity Village of Southern Nevada.

In 2016, Kimberly became a Judge of the 2017 Miss Malibu USA, 2017 Miss Beverly Hills USA, 2017 Miss Malibu Teen USA and 2017 Miss Beverly Hills Teen USA Pageant, preceding Miss California, Miss USA and Miss Universe.

The Chaine Des Rotisseurs, the world’s oldest international gastronomic society, inducted Kimberly and her husband, Brad Friedmutter, into the Las Vegas Chapter in 2017.

Friedmutter was previously married to Charles Vallow in the 1980s, who was later a victim of the Vallow-Daybell murders in 2019.

== Acting credits ==
=== Film ===
- Evil Obsession as Margo Johnson (1996)
- Time Under Fire as Jeannie Deakins (1997)
- A Match Made in Heaven as Mom (1997)
- The Russian Godfather
- Elvis Is Alive! I Swear I Just Saw Him Eating A Ding Dong (1998)

=== TV ===
- Silk Stalkings, episode Pretty in Black as Alexandra (1997)
- L.A. Heat, episode Killing on Lily Lane as Officer Bakeman (1997)
- LateLine, episode Pearce's New Buddy as Flight Attendant (1998)
- Private Chefs of Beverly Hills as herself (2010)
- Sin City Rules as herself (2012)
- Entertainment Tonight as herself (2013)
- Art Breakers as herself (2016)
- The Doctors as herself (2016)
- How the Other Half Lives as herself (2019)
- Daily Mail TV as herself (2019)
- Entertainment Tonight as herself (2019)
- CNBC Make It as herself (2019)
- The Today Show as herself (2020)
- Daily Mail TV as herself (2020)
- Las Vegas Magazine as herself (2020)
- Inside Edition as herself (2020)
- Good Day Sacramento as herself (2020)
- The Doctors (talk show) as herself (2020)
- The Real Housewives of Salt Lake City as herself (2021)
- Dateline NBC as herself (2021)
- The Doctors (talk show) as herself (2021)

== Bibliography ==
- Subconscious Power: Use Your Inner Mind to Create the Life You've Always Wanted (Atria Books, 2019).
