= Mark Arnold (actor) =

American actor (born 1957)

- Born: May 23, 1957 (age 69); Broomall, Pennsylvania, U.S.
- Occupation: Actor
- Years active: 1979–present

Mark Arnold (born May 23, 1957) is an American actor most notable for his role as a professional dancer named Gavin Wylie who became a rebel on the run on the ABC soap opera The Edge of Night from 1980 to 1983. From 1984 to 1985, he played the role of Joe Perkins, the original hero of the daytime soap Santa Barbara, replacing Dane Witherspoon. He also appeared on the serials Guiding Light, Rituals and as Rob Coronel #2 on One Life to Live from 1987 to 1989. In 1985, Arnold played Michael J. Fox's character's nemesis, Mick McAllister, in the movie Teen Wolf. He also played a major part in the Full Moon Features films Trancers 4: Jack of Swords and Trancers 5: Sudden Deth. In 2009, he played the main character's father in the movie April Showers.

== Filmography ==
=== Film ===
Year	Title	Role	Notes
1985	Teen Wolf	Mick	
1989	Fatal Bet	Sam	
1994	Threesome	Larry	
1994	Trancers 4: Jack of Swords	Lucius	
1994	Trancers 5: Sudden Deth	Lucius	
2009	April Showers	Sean's father	
2016	Abduct	Ridley Kay	
2017	Long Drive Home	David	Short film
2017	Kingsman: The Golden Circle	General McCoy	
2017	Blade Runner 2049	Interviewer	
2018	Daddy's Girl	Sheriff	
2019	Backdraft 2	Fire Chief Soto	
2019	Angel Has Fallen	James Haskell	
2019	Noir-Man	Dr. Theodore Eddy	Short film
2021	Zack Snyder's Justice League	Zack Snyder's Justice League	
2021	Wrath of Man	Super	
2022	Kill Room	Frank	
2022	A Christmas Story Christmas	Neighbor Joe	
2022	Lion Versus the Little People	Cliff Malcolm	
2022	Instinct	Commander (voice)	Short film
TBA	The Krampus Calendar	Mark	

=== Television ===
Year	Title	Role	Notes
1980-1983	The Edge of Night	Gavin Wylie	427 episodes
1984	Rituals	Steve	6 episodes
1984-1985	Santa Barbara	Joe Perkins	52 episodes
1987-1989	One Life to Live	Rob Coronel	5 episodes
2009	Criminal Minds	Mr. Seager	1 episode
2019-2020	Absentia	Deputy Director Foster Webb	6 episodes
