= List of The Secret Life of the American Teenager episodes =

The Secret Life of the American Teenager is a television series that created by Brenda Hampton. It first aired on ABC Family on July 1, 2008 in the United States. The show was renewed for a second season consisting of 24 episodes on February 9, 2009, which began airing on June 22, 2009. It started airing its 25 episode third season on June 7, 2010. On January 10, 2011, The Secret Life of the American Teenager was renewed for a third season along with a second season of the ABC Family hit show, Pretty Little Liars. Both shows are tentatively scheduled for a summer run. The first volume of season one is available on DVD in Regions 1 and 4, while the remaining DVDs are only available in Regions 1. Since the series premiered, it has averaged 3 million viewers per episode.

The Secret Life of the American Teenager focuses on the relationships between families and friends and how they deal with the unexpected teenage pregnancy of character Amy Juergens, who is portrayed by Shailene Woodley.

A total of 121 episodes of The Secret Life of the American Teenager have aired over five seasons, between July 1, 2008 and June 3, 2013.

== Series overview ==
Season	Episodes	Originally released		U.S. viewers (millions)
Season	Episodes	First released	Last released	U.S. viewers (millions)
1	23	July 1, 2008	March 23, 2009	3.51
2	24	June 22, 2009	March 22, 2010	3.24
3	26	June 7, 2010	June 6, 2011	2.74
4	24	June 13, 2011	June 4, 2012	2.14
5	24	June 11, 2012	June 3, 2013	1.22

== Episodes ==
=== Season 1 (2008–2009) ===
No. overall	No. in season	Title	Directed by	Written by	Original release date	U.S. viewers (millions)
1	1	"Falling In Love"	Ron Underwood	Brenda Hampton	July 1, 2008	2.82
2	2	"You Are My Everything"	Keith Truesdell	Brenda Hampton	July 8, 2008	2.81
3	3	"I Feel Sick"	Ron Underwood	Brenda Hampton	July 15, 2008	2.48
4	4	"Caught"	Keith Truesdell	Brenda Hampton	July 22, 2008	3.09
5	5	"What Have You Done to Me?"	Ron Underwood	Brenda Hampton	July 29, 2008	3.58
6	6	"Love for Sale"	Keith Truesdell	Brenda Hampton	August 5, 2008	4.10
7	7	"Absent"	Anson Williams	Brenda Hampton & Jeffery Rodgers	August 12, 2008	3.70
8	8	"Your Cheatin' Heart"	Keith Truesdell	Brenda Hampton & Elaine Arata	August 19, 2008	3.91
9	9	"Slice of Life"	Jason Priestley	Brenda Hampton, Jeff Olsen, & Chris Olsen	August 26, 2008	3.65
10	10	"Back to School Special"	Keith Truesdell	Caroline Kepnes	September 2, 2008	3.90
11	11	"Just Say No"	Jason Priestley	Teleplay by : Jeff Olson & Caroline Kepnes; Story by : Elaine Arata & Brenda Hampton	September 9, 2008	4.54
12	12	"The Secret Wedding of the American Teenager"	Lindsley Parsons III	Brenda Hampton	January 5, 2009	4.37
13	13	"Baked Nevada"	Anson Williams	Brenda Hampton	January 12, 2009	3.10
14	14	"The Father and the Son"	Keith Truesdell	Brenda Hampton	January 19, 2009	3.91
15	15	"That's Enough of That"	Anson Williams	Brenda Hampton & Jeffrey Rodgers	January 26, 2009	3.10
16	16	"Chocolate Cake"	Keith Truesdell	Brenda Hampton & Jeffrey Rodgers	February 2, 2009	3.05
17	17	"Unforgiven"	Jason Priestley	Brenda Hampton & Elaine Arata	February 9, 2009	3.50
18	18	"Making Up Is Hard to Do"	Keith Truesdell	Brenda Hampton, Chris Olsen, & Jeff Olsen	February 16, 2009	3.51
19	19	"Money for Nothing, Chicks for Free"	Jason Priestley	Brenda Hampton & Caroline Kepnes	February 23, 2009	3.27
20	20	"Maybe Baby"	Keith Truesdell	Brenda Hampton	March 2, 2009	3.32
21	21	"Whoomp! (There It Is)"	Jason Priestley	Brenda Hampton	March 9, 2009	3.35
22	22	"One Night at Band Camp"	John Schneider	Brenda Hampton & Jeffrey Rodgers	March 16, 2009	3.11
23	23	"And Unto Us, A Child Is Born"	Keith Truesdell	Brenda Hampton	March 23, 2009	4.49

=== Season 2 (2009–2010) ===
No. overall	No. in season	Title	Directed by	Written by	Original release date	U.S. viewers (millions)
24	1	"The Big One"	Keith Truesdell	Brenda Hampton & Elaine Arata	June 22, 2009	4.68
25	2	"What's Done Is Done"	Gail Bradley	Brenda Hampton & Elaine Arata	June 29, 2009	3.30
26	3	"Par for the Course"	Keith Truesdell	Brenda Hampton	July 6, 2009	2.85
27	4	"Ciao"	Anson Williams	Brenda Hampton	July 13, 2009	3.13
28	5	"Born Free"	Keith Truesdell	Caroline Kepnes	July 20, 2009	3.02
29	6	"The Summer of Our Discontent"	Lindsley Parsons III	Jeffrey Rodgers	July 27, 2009	3.10
30	7	"Summertime"	Keith Truesdell	Brenda Hampton	August 3, 2009	3.56
31	8	"A New Kind of Green"	Anson Williams	Brenda Hampton	August 10, 2009	2.76
32	9	"Hot Nuts"	Keith Truesdell	Brenda Hampton	August 17, 2009	3.30
33	10	"Knocked Up, Who's There?"	Anson Williams	Brenda Hampton	August 24, 2009	3.21
34	11	"Cramped"	Keith Truesdell	Brenda Hampton	August 31, 2009	3.11
35	12	"Be My, Be My Baby"	Anson Williams	Brenda Hampton & Jeffrey Rodgers	September 7, 2009	3.56
36	13	"You Don't Know What You've Got..."	Keith Truesdell	Teleplay by : Chris Olsen & Jeff Olsen; Story by : Brenda Hampton	January 4, 2010	4.55
37	14	"Til It's Gone"	Gail Bradley	Teleplay by : Elaine Arata & Jeffrey Rodgers; Story by : Brenda Hampton	January 11, 2010	3.11
38	15	"Loved & Lost"	Keith Truesdell	Teleplay by : Elaine Arata & Jeffrey Rodgers; Story by : Brenda Hampton	January 18, 2010	2.97
39	16	"Just Say Me"	Anson Williams	Brenda Hampton & Paul Perlove	January 25, 2010	3.23
40	17	"The Second Time Around"	Keith Truesdell	Brenda Hampton & Elaine Arata	February 1, 2010	2.89
41	18	"Let's Try That Again"	Barry Watson	Brenda Hampton	February 8, 2010	2.99
42	19	"The Rhythm of Life"	Keith Truesdell	Brenda Hampton & Jeffrey Rodgers	February 15, 2010	3.18
43	20	"Mistakes Were Made"	Anson Williams	Brenda Hampton	February 22, 2010	3.03
44	21	"Choices"	Keith Truesdell	Brenda Hampton & Elaine Arata	March 1, 2010	3.14
45	22	"Good Girls & Boys"	Anson Williams	Brenda Hampton	March 8, 2010	3.21
46	23	"I Got You, Babe"	Keith Truesdell	Brenda Hampton & Jeffrey Rodgers	March 15, 2010	2.79
47	24	"Ben There, Done That"	Anson Williams	Brenda Hampton & Elaine Arata	March 22, 2010	3.17

=== Season 3 (2010–2011) ===
No. overall	No. in season	Title	Directed by	Written by	Original release date	U.S. viewers (millions)
48	1	"Do Over"	Keith Truesdell	Brenda Hampton	June 7, 2010	3.18
49	2	"Accentuate the Positive"	Gail Bradley	Jeffrey Rodgers	June 14, 2010	2.85
50	3	"Get Out of Town"	Keith Truesdell	Brenda Hampton	June 21, 2010	2.77
51	4	"Goodbye, Amy Juergens"	Anson Williams	Elaine Arata	June 28, 2010	3.00
52	5	"Which Way Did She Go?"	Keith Truesdell	Brenda Hampton	July 5, 2010	2.99
53	6	"She Went That Away"	Lindsley Parsons III	Paul Perlove	July 12, 2010	3.09
54	7	"New York, New York"	Keith Truesdell	Brenda Hampton	July 19, 2010	3.04
55	8	"The Sounds of Silence"	Anson Williams	Jeffrey Rodgers	July 26, 2010	2.56
56	9	"Chicken Little"	Keith Truesdell	Brenda Hampton	August 2, 2010	2.71
57	10	"My Girlfriend's Back"	Anson Williams	Elaine Arata	August 9, 2010	2.65
58	11	"Lady Liberty"	Keith Truesdell	Brenda Hampton	August 16, 2010	2.83
59	12	"Sweet and Sour"	Anson Williams	Paul Perlove	August 23, 2010	2.68
60	13	"Up All Night"	Anson Williams	Brenda Hampton	August 30, 2010	2.91
61	14	"Rules of Engagement"	Keith Truesdell	Brenda Hampton	September 6, 2010	3.03
62	15	"Who Do You Trust"	Keith Truesdell	Brenda Hampton	March 28, 2011	3.33
63	16	"Mirrors"	Anson Williams	Jeffrey Rodgers	April 4, 2011	2.50
64	17	"Guess Who's Not Coming to Dinner"	Gail Bradley	Brenda Hampton	April 11, 2011	2.29
65	18	"Another Proposal"	Anson Williams	Elaine Arata	April 18, 2011	2.35
66	19	"Deeper and Deeper"	Keith Truesdell	Brenda Hampton	April 25, 2011	2.21
67	20	"Moving In and Out"	Anson Williams	Paul Perlove	May 2, 2011	2.11
68	21	"Young at Heart"	Keith Truesdell	Brenda Hampton	May 9, 2011	2.05
69	22	"Loose Lips"	Anson Williams	Jeffrey Rodgers	May 16, 2011	2.32
70	23	"Round II"	Lindsley Parsons III	Brenda Hampton	May 23, 2011	2.22
71	24	"It's Not Over Till It's Over"	Lindsley Parsons III	Brenda Hampton	May 30, 2011	2.12
72	25	"To Be..."	Lindsley Parsons III	Jeffrey Rodgers	May 30, 2011	2.12
73	26	"... or Not To Be"	Anson Williams	Brenda Hampton	June 6, 2011	3.56

=== Season 4 (2011–2012) ===
No. overall	No. in season	Title	Directed by	Written by	Original release date	U.S. viewers (millions)
74	1	"When One Door Closes..."	Keith Truesdell	Brenda Hampton	June 13, 2011	3.07
75	2	"...Another One Opens"	Anson Williams	Brenda Hampton	June 20, 2011	2.71
76	3	"When Opportunity Knocks"	Keith Truesdell	Brenda Hampton	June 27, 2011	2.81
77	4	"One Foot Out the Door"	Gail Bradley	Paul Perlove	July 4, 2011	1.60
78	5	"Hole in the Wall"	Keith Truesdell	Brenda Hampton	July 11, 2011	2.69
79	6	"Don't Go in There!"	Anson Williams	Elaine Arata	July 18, 2011	2.58
80	7	"Cute"	Keith Truesdell	Jeffrey Rodgers	July 25, 2011	2.90
81	8	"Dancing With the Stars"	Gail Bradley	Brenda Hampton	August 1, 2011	2.35
82	9	"Flip Flop"	Keith Truesdell	Kelley Turk & Courtney Turk	August 8, 2011	2.53
83	10	"4-1-1"	Anson Williams	Brenda Hampton	August 15, 2011	2.42
84	11	"The Games We Play"	Gail Bradley	Brenda Hampton & Elaine Arata	August 22, 2011	2.51
85	12	"Pomp"	Lindsley Parsons III	Brenda Hampton	August 29, 2011	2.38
86	13	"And Circumstance"	Keith Truesdell	Brenda Hampton	September 5, 2011	2.83
87	14	"Smokin' Like A Virgin"	Gail Bradley	Brenda Hampton	March 26, 2012	2.51
88	15	"Defiance"	Anson Williams	Brenda Hampton	April 2, 2012	1.56
89	16	"They Gotta Eat"	Lindsley Parsons III	Brenda Hampton & Elaine Arata	April 9, 2012	1.61
90	17	"Suddenly Last Summer"	Keith Truesdell	Brenda Hampton	April 16, 2012	1.61
91	18	"The Beach is Back"	Gail Bradley	Brenda Hampton	April 23, 2012	1.60
92	19	"The Splits"	Keith Truesdell	Brenda Hampton	April 30, 2012	1.47
93	20	"Strange Familiar"	Anson Williams	Brenda Hampton & Paul Perlove	May 7, 2012	1.51
94	21	"Allies"	Keith Truesdell	Brenda Hampton & Elaine Arata	May 14, 2012	1.40
95	22	"The Text Best Thing"	Anson Williams	Brenda Hampton & Jeffrey Rodgers	May 21, 2012	1.16
96	23	"4SnP"	Keith Truesdell	Brenda Hampton, Kelley Turk, & Courtney Turk	May 28, 2012	1.40
97	24	"Love is Love"	Gail Bradley	Brenda Hampton & Anne Ramsay	June 4, 2012	1.43

=== Season 5 (2012–2013) ===
No. overall	No. in season	Title	Directed by	Written by	Original release date	U.S. viewers (millions)
98	1	"To Begin With ..."	Keith Truesdell	Brenda Hampton & Elaine Arata	June 11, 2012	1.67
99	2	"Shotgun"	Gail Bradley	Brenda Hampton	June 18, 2012	1.68
100	3	"I Do and I Don't"	Keith Truesdell	Brenda Hampton	June 25, 2012	1.56
101	4	"Lies and Byes"	Gail Bradley	Brenda Hampton	July 9, 2012	1.25
102	5	"Past History"	Anson Williams	Brenda Hampton, Kelley Turk, & Courtney Turk	July 16, 2012	1.25
103	6	"Holy Rollers"	Lindsley Parsons III	Brenda Hampton & Jeffrey Rodgers	July 23, 2012	1.52
104	7	"Girlfriends"	Keith Truesdell	Brenda Hampton & Paul Perlove	July 30, 2012	1.13
105	8	"Setting Things Straight"	Gail Bradley	Brenda Hampton & Elaine Arata	August 6, 2012	1.10
106	9	"Property Not For Sale"	Keith Truesdell	Brenda Hampton & Elaine Arata	August 13, 2012	1.06
107	10	"Regrets"	Gail Bradley	Brenda Hampton & Elaine Arata	August 20, 2012	1.41
108	11	"Half Over"	Anson Williams	Brenda Hampton	August 27, 2012	1.54
109	12	"Hedy's Happy Holiday House"	Keith Truesdell	Brenda Hampton	November 19, 2012	1.59
110	13	"To Each Her Own"	Lindsley Parsons III	Brenda Hampton	March 18, 2013	1.33
111	14	"It's a Miracle"	Keith Truesdell	Brenda Hampton & Elaine Arata	March 25, 2013	1.19
112	15	"Untying the Knot"	Gail Bradley	Brenda Hampton & Jeffrey Rodgers	April 1, 2013	1.00
113	16	"Shiny and New"	Gail Bradley	Paul Perlove	April 8, 2013	0.90
114	17	"Fraid So"	Anson Williams	Kelley Turk & Courtney Turk	April 15, 2013	1.04
115	18	"Money for Nothin"	Lindsley Parsons III	Brenda Hampton & Elaine Arata	April 22, 2013	1.03
116	19	"Interference"	Keith Truesdell	Brenda Hampton & Elaine Arata	April 29, 2013	0.88
117	20	"First and Last"	Gail Bradley	Brenda Hampton & Elaine Arata	May 6, 2013	0.89
118	21	"All My Sisters With Me"	Keith Truesdell	Brenda Hampton & Jeffrey Rodgers	May 13, 2013	0.89
119	22	"When Bad Things Happen to Bad People"	Gail Bradley	Brenda Hampton & Elaine Arata	May 20, 2013	0.99
120	23	"Caught in a Trap"	Keith Truesdell	Brenda Hampton & Elaine Arata	May 27, 2013	0.85
121	24	"Thank You And Goodbye"	Gail Bradley	Brenda Hampton	June 3, 2013	1.50

== Home media ==
Each Secret Life season is released on DVD in separate volumes. Season one, confusingly, is sold as "season one" and "season two". Season two is sold as "volume three" and "volume four". Season one, volume one has been released in Regions 1 and 4, while season one, volume two, season two, volumes one and two have been released only in Region 1. The season one DVD was released in Australia on December 1, 2009, and a future Blu-ray format was planned for release.
