= The Secret Life of the American Teenager =

2008 American TV series

- Also known as: Secret Life
- Genre: Teen drama
- Created by: Brenda Hampton
- Starring: Shailene Woodley; Kenny Baumann; Mark Derwin; India Eisley; Greg Finley; Daren Kagasoff; Jorge-Luis Pallo; Megan Park; Francia Raisa; Molly Ringwald; Steve Schirripa
- Theme music composer: Dan Foliart
- Opening theme: "Let's Do It, Let's Fall in Love", performed by Molly Ringwald
- Composer: Dan Foliart
- Country of origin: United States
- Original language: English
- No. of seasons: 5
- No. of episodes: 121 (list of episodes)

Production
- Executive producer: Brenda Hampton
- Producers: Lindsley Parsons III; Hrag Gaboudian
- Production locations: Los Angeles, California
- Cinematography: Ronald E. High; William L. Asman
- Editors: Stephen Myers; Ellen Ring Jacobson; Marilyn McMahon Adams; Janet Weinberg; Janet Gratz
- Camera setup: Single-camera
- Running time: 45 minutes
- Production companies: Brendavision!; ProdCo Original; American Teenager Inc.

Original release
- Network: ABC Family
- Release: July 1, 2008 – June 3, 2013

The Secret Life of the American Teenager (often shortened to Secret Life) is an American teen drama television series created by Brenda Hampton. It aired on ABC Family from July 1, 2008, to June 3, 2013. It stars Shailene Woodley as Amy Juergens, a teenage girl who becomes pregnant and must navigate relationships between her family and friends as they deal with her unexpected teenage pregnancy and teenage motherhood.

The series was notable for its frank discussions of teenage sexuality and its attempts to educate viewers about the consequences of sexual activity. However, its approach to these topics often sparked debate. While some praised the show for tackling issues like teenage pregnancy and promoting open dialogue about sexual health, others criticized it for its didactic tone, unrealistic dialogue, and oversimplified portrayals of complex issues. Additionally, the series faced backlash for its heavy emphasis on abstinence and its portrayal of moral and religious perspectives, which some viewers and critics felt were overly judgmental or out of touch with the realities of teenage life.

Despite its polarizing reception, The Secret Life of the American Teenager was a ratings success for ABC Family, particularly in its early seasons. The series premiere drew 2.82 million viewers, making it one of the network's most-watched debuts at the time. The show consistently ranked as one of the top cable series among teens and young adults, with its second season premiere attracting 4.52 million viewers, a record high for the series.

However, as the series progressed, viewership began to decline. By its fifth and final season, the show averaged around 1.5 million viewers per episode, a significant drop from its earlier highs. In 2013, ABC Family announced that the fifth season would be its last, concluding the series with a two-hour finale that drew 3.3 million viewers.

== Series overview ==
=== Season 1 ===
In season one, fifteen-year-old Amy Juergens—a French horn player at Grant High School—discovers that she is pregnant after having sex at band camp with playboy Ricky Underwood. Amy first confides in her two best friends Lauren and Madison about it, where they consider her options: abortion, adoption, or keeping the baby. In the midst of discovering she's pregnant, she begins dating Ben Boykewich, the son of sausage mogul Leo Boykewich. Amy tells Ben the truth, and he proposes marriage. When Ricky finds out he is the father, he is willing to be a part of the child's life. This causes Adrian Lee, Ricky's casual relationship, to express jealousy. In addition to Adrian, Ricky demonstrates an interest in Grace Bowman, who was dating Jack Pappas until he cheated on her with Adrian. Grace resolves her anger and the girls become friends despite being romantic rivals. Ricky and Ben compete with each other for Amy's attention; establishing their positions as romantic rivals. At the end of the season, Amy gives birth to a son, whom her sister, Ashley, names John. Amy decides to keep John after struggling with the decision over the course of the season.

=== Season 2 ===
In season two, Amy's parents Anne and George Juergens are getting divorced. Anne begins dating her boss, David, but discovers she's pregnant despite his fertility issues. Therefore, she assumes George is the father. Grace loses her virginity to Jack on the night her father dies in a plane crash, leaving her feeling guilty. She blames their sexual encounter for her father's death, which causes Jack to begin drinking. Jack then shortly after breaks up with Grace and begins dating Madison. Ashley begins her freshman year at Grant High and struggles with Amy's legacy as a teenage mother. She befriends a gay classmate named Griffin and they both pledge to remain abstinent throughout high school. Ben returns from his summer trip to Italy. Meanwhile, Amy is raising John and argues with Ricky over split-custody arrangements. Ben is expressing jealousy due to Ricky's constant presence, leading him and Amy to end their relationship. Ricky and Adrian have agreed to date officially, but Ricky is unable to remain faithful. Grace's mother, Kathleen Bowman, gets remarried to her late husband's coworker, Jeff Tseguay. Ricky and Amy's romantic tension ends when the two kiss. Adrian cheats on Ricky with Ben after learning of Ricky and Amy's kiss. Ricky breaks up with Adrian and refuses to forgive Ben.

=== Season 3 ===
In season three, Adrian is pregnant with Ben's baby. Ben and Amy rekindle their relationship and start considering taking their physical relationship further. Amy gets an opportunity to attend a music program for single mothers and will be in New York for six weeks, where Ben tells her about Adrian's pregnancy. George and Anne Juergens have officially divorced. Anne moves closer to her mother, while George remains home with Amy and Ashley. Ashley drops out of school and begins homeschooling herself. Jeff goes to Zimbabwe for a mission to bring medical aid to people in developing countries. Due to Adrian's pregnancy, Ben and Amy officially end their relationship. Eventually, Amy and Ricky begin to date, but concerns arise due to Ricky's unfaithful past. Due to the baby's imminent arrival, Adrian and Ben get married and move into a condo together. Adrian expresses concern that something might be wrong with their baby. They call their doctor, who has them meet her at the hospital. Adrian gives birth to their stillborn daughter, whom they name Mercy. Amy and Ricky have sex after getting home from the hospital.

=== Season 4 ===
In season four, Amy and Ricky start dating. Amy and John move into Ricky's apartment above Leo's butcher shop. Ashley graduates high school early and decides to leave Los Angeles to go on a country-wide road trip with her homeschooled friend, Toby. Adrian and Ben struggle with the stillbirth, and Ben wants to divorce Adrian. Adrian attempts to remain married, but they eventually divorce. Ricky proposes to Amy at his graduation, and she says yes. Jesse has a graduation party and everyone is invited. While still in mourning, Ben meets Dylan—a private school student at the graduation party.

=== Season 5 ===
In season five, Amy and Ricky continue to live together and discuss getting married. Ashley breaks up with her boyfriend Toby and moves in with her mother before moving to Italy for culinary school. Ben is still pursuing Amy, but continues dating Dylan. Adrian is living with her boyfriend Omar, who has proposed to her. Both Amy and Ben get accepted to Hudson University: a college located in New York City. Amy and Ricky plan to elope, but ultimately decide to not get married. When they return home, they tell everyone they did get married. Eventually, they let everyone know the truth and plan for a real wedding. Anne reveals that she is a lesbian and George starts dating Kathleen once he realizes he and Anne will never get back together. The series ends with Amy breaking up with Ricky, saying that when they both get married it should be because they are in love. She leaves to go to college in New York. Ben attends the same college, and he and Amy both live in the same apartment building provided by Leo. Amy leaves John with Ricky, so Ricky will take care of him throughout Amy's college career.

== Cast and characters ==
=== Main characters ===
- Shailene Woodley as Amy Juergens
- Ken Baumann as Ben Boykewich
- Mark Derwin as George Juergens
- India Eisley as Ashley Juergens (seasons 1–4; special guest season 5)
- Greg Finley as Jack Pappas
- Daren Kagasoff as Ricky Underwood
- Megan Park as Grace Bowman
- Francia Raisa as Adrian Lee
- Molly Ringwald as Anne Juergens (seasons 1–4; special guest star season 5)
- Steve Schirripa as Leo Boykewich (seasons 3–5; recurring seasons 1–2)

=== Recurring characters ===
- Jorge-Luis Pallo as Marc Molina (season 1; guest season 2)
- Tom Virtue as Rev. Sam Stone
- Philip Anthony-Rodriguez as Ruben Enriquez
- Paola Turbay as Cindy Lee Enriquez
- L. Scott Caldwell as Margaret Shakur
- Jennifer Coolidge as Betty Boykewich
- Reid Scott as Dr. Jeff Tseguay
- Anne Ramsay as Nora Underwood
- Amy Rider as Alice Valko
- Allen Evangelista as Henry Miller
- Josie Bissett as Kathleen Bowman
- Luke Zimmerman as Tom Bowman
- John Schneider as Dr. Marshall Bowman
- Renee Olstead as Madison Cooperstein
- Camille Winbush as Lauren Treacy
- Andrew McFarlane as Jason Treacy
- Bryan Callen as Bob Underwood
- Brando Eaton as Griffin
- Beverley Mitchell as Katelyn O'Malley
- Ana Lucasey as Dylan
- Austin Stowell as Jesse
- Cierra Ramirez as Kathy
- Michael Grant as Ethan
- Alice Hirson as Mimsy Scott Levy

== Episodes ==
Season	Episodes	Originally released		U.S. viewers (millions)
Season	Episodes	First released	Last released	U.S. viewers (millions)
1	23	July 1, 2008	March 23, 2009	3.51
2	24	June 22, 2009	March 22, 2010	3.24
3	26	June 7, 2010	June 6, 2011	2.74
4	24	June 13, 2011	June 4, 2012	2.14
5	24	June 11, 2012	June 3, 2013	1.22

== Broadcasting ==
The Secret Life of the American Teenager first aired on ABC Family on July 1, 2008. Season 1 began with 11 episodes broadcast from July 1, 2008, to September 9, 2008. After a hiatus, 12 first-season episodes aired January 5, 2009, through March 23, 2009, despite being marketed as season 2, for a total of 23 episodes. The first season was aired on Canadian broadcaster City starting on September 3, 2008. In early 2009, City removed Secret Life from its schedule. Therefore, MuchMusic started to air the first season in Canada on November 30, 2009, followed by the second season on December 7, 2009. In the United Kingdom Secret Life is available on ABC Studios via sky on demand It broken up into eight seasons in contrast to the original five. Secret Life reruns are available on Channel 4 in the United Kingdom.

The pilot episode broke the record for the highest rated debut on ABC Family with 2.82 million viewers, a record previously held by Kyle XY. The season one finale brought in 4.50 million viewers, beating that night's episode of Gossip Girl, which had less than half its usual number of viewers. Furthermore, the mid-season premiere became ABC Family's most-watched telecast for viewers ages 12–34, with more than three million viewers watching.

ABC Family announced on January 31, 2009, plans to renew Secret Life. The official press release was released on February 9 and was added to ABC Family's line up on April 7, 2009. The show was renewed for a 24-episode second season, which began airing on June 22, 2009. Season 2 began with 12 episodes broadcast starting June 22, 2009, through September 7, 2009. After a four-month hiatus, the second half of the season returned on January 4, 2010, and concluded on March 22, 2010. The second season of Secret Life opened with the largest audience for the series with 4.68 million viewers ranging from 18–34.

Following its return, Secret Life was picked up for an additional season. The third-season premiere of Secret Life aired on June 7, 2010, at 8 pm. On January 10, 2011, it was reported that Secret Life was picked up for a fourth season to be shown in Summer 2011 and season three would resume on March 28, 2011, after an extended season break. The second half of the fourth season aired on March 26, 2012.

On February 2, 2012, it was announced ABC Family renewed The Secret Life of the American Teenager for a fifth season.

=== Home media ===
Each Secret Life season is released on DVD in separate volumes by Buena Vista Home Entertainment under the ABC Family brand. Season one is sold as "Season One and Season Two" and season two onward are sold as volumes The DVD releases include commentary by cast and crew members, deleted scenes, interviews with the cast, and behind-the-scenes features.

DVD release dates for The Secret Life of the American Teenager
Name	Release dates			Eps.	Additional information
Name	Region 1	Region 2	Region 4	Eps.	Additional information
Volume One	December 30, 2008	TBA	TBA	11	Incorrectly marketed as season one. Extras include deleted scenes, cast interviews, gag reel, episode commentaries, and 7 featurettes
Volume Two	June 16, 2009	TBA	TBA	12	Incorrectly marketed as season two. Extras include behind-the-scenes featurettes with the cast, exclusive music video from The Strange Familiar
Volume Three	December 22, 2009	TBA	TBA	12	Extras include pilot episode "Make It or Break It", "Hot Chat", exclusive behind-the-scenes look at the cast
Volume Four	June 15, 2010	TBA	TBA	12	Extras include behind the "Secret" scenes, "Cast on Family", interviews with cast and composer
Volume Five	December 21, 2010	TBA	TBA	14	"On Set with Director Anson Williams", "On Set Fist Bumps with Joey and Matthew Levinson", "On Set with Shailene Woodley", "On Set with Luke Zimmerman"
Volume Six	June 7, 2011	TBA	TBA	12	
Volume Seven	March 20, 2012	TBA	TBA	13	

== Reception ==
=== Critical response ===
On the review aggregator website Rotten Tomatoes, the first season holds an approval rating of 38% based on 21 reviews, with an average rating of 5.50/10. The site's critics consensus reads, "While The Secret Life of the American Teenager manages to show teens behaving like real teenagers, forced dialogue and an overall lack of originality leaves the show stranded at the border of soap opera parody." On Metacritic, the first season of the show holds a score 48 out of 100 based on reviews from 15 critics, indicating "mixed or average reviews".

The New York Post praised the series for having a set of characters that are "... real and come from families of all stripes – from intact to single-parent households to one boy in foster care..." However, most mainstream critics did not embrace the show, likening it to an after-school special "filled with didactic messages and a lotta wooden acting," in the words of Ken Tucker of Entertainment Weekly. The New York Times claimed that "Secret Life must surely be the collective effort of an anti-pregnancy cabal. [...] ABC Family means well but could not have done worse. Secret Life doesn't take the fun out of teenage pregnancy, it takes the fun out of television" and called the show a "Prime-Time Cautionary Tale". Variety magazine reported that "ABC Family's latest original drama wants to be a slow-motion version of Juno but settles for being an obvious, stereotype-laden teen soap [...] based on first impressions, The Secret Life of the American Teenager should probably stay a secret." ReporterMag's Andrew Rees said, "The show...might be the worst scripted drama on television. Suffering from gag-worthy dialog, horrific plot twists, terrible acting, and characters who not even the best of 3-D glasses could give depth to, it's a wonder how this show stays on the air."

Some critics praised the new developments of the show's second season. Jean Bently of EW Popwatch said that now that the "teen going through a pregnancy" plot has completed and the "frustrated young mother" plot is occurring, we have room to explore some other topics. She remained hopeful that the writers will not just turn these new problems into issues of the week, instead allowing time for the characters to grieve Marshall's death, deal with Anne's accidental pregnancy, and explore the more emotionally complex aspects of teenage sex.

=== Ratings ===
Secret Life received the highest premiere viewership ratings ever for an ABC Family original program. The pilot episode brought in 2.82 million viewers and a 0.9/3 share in the 18- to 49-year-old demographic. Secret Life also established female viewers, registering a 6.5/24 among female teenagers and a 3.1/11 among 12- to 34-year-old females. The mid-season finale of season one surpassed the first hour of the series premiere of 90210 on The CW in viewers 12–34 and females 12–34, beating 90210 in total viewers and all their key demographics. The season one finale brought in 4.50 million viewers and was the highest rated telecast on March 23, 2009, in viewers aged 12–34 and the number one scripted telecast that night.

On Monday, June 22, 2009, Secret Life began its second season, posting a series high with 4.68 million viewers. In June 2009, Secret Life ranked as cable's number one scripted telecast in females 12–34. Secret Life stood as ad-supported cable's number one telecast for June 2009 in female teens. The season debut became cable's number one scripted series premiere of the 2008/2009 season in women 18–34, women 18–49, and viewers 12–34, and the number one scripted original premiere of summer 2009 in adults 18–34.

With more than 4.55 million people watching the season two mid-season premiere, Secret Life became ABC Family's most-watched telecast in the 12–34 age range and teen demographics. The episode stands as the series' second-most-watched episode and is TV's number one telecast of the season for female teenagers. The season two mid-season premiere remains cable's number one scripted premiere of the 2009 and 2010 season. It increased nearly one million total viewers over its second season's mid-season finale, and was number one in all target demographics for the hour.

On Monday, June 7, 2010, Secret Life began its third season as the number one premiere for the 2010 summer season. It drew 1.3 million women 18–49 viewers, 2.3 million viewers 12–34, 1.8 million female 12–34 viewers, and 1.0 million teen viewers, topping the premieres of Burn Notice, Royal Pains, and Pawn Stars. Monday's Secret Life ranks as summer's number one scripted premiere on cable with 1.2 million viewers adults 18–34. It increased viewership over its season two finale, growing by 20% in adults 18–34, by 21% in adults 18–49, and by 10% in viewers 12–34.

Regarding The Secret Life's advertising, Laura Caraccioli-Davis, executive vice president of the media buyer Starcom, said, "Nielsen numbers will do the talking in the advertising community, which has a deep respect for success."

The following is a table with the average estimated number of viewers per episode, each season of The Secret Life of the American Teenager on ABC Family.

Viewership and ratings per season of The Secret Life of the American Teenager
Season	Timeslot (ET)	Episodes	First aired		Last aired		Avg. viewers (millions)
Season	Timeslot (ET)	Episodes	Date	Viewers (millions)	Date	Viewers (millions)	Avg. viewers (millions)
1	Tuesday 8:00 pm (2008); Monday 8:00 pm (2009)	23	July 1, 2008	2.82	March 23, 2009	4.50	3.51
2	Monday 8:00 pm	24	June 22, 2009	4.68	March 22, 2010	3.17	3.24
3	Monday 8:00 pm	26	June 7, 2010	3.18	June 6, 2011	3.56	3.74
4	Monday 8:00 pm	24	June 13, 2011	3.07	June 4, 2012	1.43	2.14
5	Monday 8:00 pm	24	June 11, 2012	1.67	June 3, 2013	1.50	1.22

=== Accolades ===
Awards and nominations for The Secret Life of the American Teenager
Year	Award	Category	Nominee(s) and recipient(s)	Result	Ref.
2008	Teen Choice Awards	Choice Summer TV Show	The Secret Life of the American Teenager	Won	
2009	ALMA Awards	Outstanding Actress in a Drama Series	Francia Raisa	Nominated	
2009	ALMA Awards	Outstanding Actress in a Drama Series	Paola Turbay	Nominated	
2009	Gracie Allen Awards	Outstanding Drama	The Secret Life of the American Teenager	Won	
2009	Teen Choice Awards	Choice Summer TV Star: Male	Daren Kagasoff	Won	
2009	Teen Choice Awards	Choice TV Show: Drama	The Secret Life of the American Teenager	Nominated	
2009	Teen Choice Awards	Choice TV: Breakout Show	The Secret Life of the American Teenager	Nominated	
2009	Teen Choice Awards	Choice TV Actor: Drama	Ken Baumann	Nominated	
2009	Teen Choice Awards	Choice TV Actress: Drama	Shailene Woodley	Nominated	
2009	Teen Choice Awards	Choice TV Parental Unit	Molly Ringwald, Mark Derwin	Nominated	
2009	Teen Choice Awards	Choice Summer TV Star: Female	Shailene Woodley	Nominated	
2009	Teen Choice Awards	Choice Summer TV Show	The Secret Life of the American Teenager	Nominated	
2009	Teen Choice Awards	Choice Summer TV Star: Male	Ken Baumann	Nominated	
2010	Imagen Foundation Awards	Best Supporting Actress - Television	Paola Turbay	Nominated	
2010	Gracie Allen Awards	Outstanding Female Rising Star in a Drama Series	Shailene Woodley	Won	
2010	Teen Choice Awards	Choice TV Show: Drama	The Secret Life of the American Teenager	Nominated	
2010	Teen Choice Awards	Choice TV Actor: Drama	Daren Kagasoff	Nominated	
2010	Teen Choice Awards	Choice TV Actor: Drama	Ken Baumann	Nominated	
2010	Teen Choice Awards	Choice TV Actress: Drama	Shailene Woodley	Nominated	
2010	Teen Choice Awards	Choice Summer TV Show	The Secret Life of the American Teenager	Nominated	
2010	Teen Choice Awards	Choice Summer TV Star: Male	Ken Baumann	Nominated	
2010	Teen Choice Awards	Choice Summer TV Star: Male	Daren Kagasoff	Nominated	
2010	Teen Choice Awards	Choice Summer TV Star: Female	Shailene Woodley	Nominated	
2011	ALMA Awards	Outstanding Actress in a Drama Television Series	Francia Raisa	Nominated	
2011	Teen Choice Awards	Choice TV Show: Drama	The Secret Life of the American Teenager	Nominated	
2011	Teen Choice Awards	Choice TV Actress: Drama	Shailene Woodley	Nominated	
2011	Teen Choice Awards	Choice TV Actor: Drama	Daren Kagasoff	Nominated	
2012	Imagen Foundation Awards	Best Young Actress - Television	Francia Raisa	Nominated	
2012	Teen Choice Awards	Choice Summer TV Star: Male	Ken Baumann	Nominated	
2012	Teen Choice Awards	Choice Summer TV Star: Male	Daren Kagasoff	Nominated	
2012	Teen Choice Awards	Choice TV: Female Scene Stealer	Francia Raisa	Nominated	
2012	Teen Choice Awards	Choice Summer TV Star: Female	Shailene Woodley	Nominated	
2012	Teen Choice Awards	Choice Summer TV Show	The Secret Life of the American Teenager	Nominated	
2013	Imagen Foundation Awards	Best Young Actress/Television	Cierra Ramirez	Nominated	

== Soundtrack ==
=== Music ===
The series theme, sung by Molly Ringwald, is an upbeat version of Cole Porter's "Let's Do It (Let's Fall in Love)". Other noteworthy music featured in the installments includes:

- Both the first and last episodes of the first season feature the song "Girlfriend" by Avril Lavigne. It was also featured in the second-season episode 22. A piano version of the song was played during mid-4th-season finale.
- In the fifteenth episode of the second season, Jack plays "She Don't Wanna Man" by Asher Roth while he and Madison dance.
- At the Mother-Daughter Dance (Season 2, Episode 19), "Love Story" by Taylor Swift is played in the background while Amy, her mother, and Ashley sit on the bleachers.
- In the fourth episode of the third season, when Adrian sits sadly on the stairs in front of her house, Tom plays "You Are So Beautiful" performed by Joe Cocker on his cell phone before they dance. (Season 3, episode 4).
- The song "Kids" by MGMT appears in the fifth episode of the third season when a slide show of Amy lost in New York is played.
- At a party in the Bowmans' guesthouse, the song "New Day" performed by Tamar Kaprelian is played.
- Bruno Mars' "Just the Way You Are" plays in the final moments of the first half of the third-season finale, including during Ben and Adrian's wedding.
- Sarah McLachlan's "Angel" plays after Ben and Adrian find out the baby is dead, and the montage is played to close the season.
- "Daughters" by John Mayer was featured in the season's first episode during Amy's visit to the clinic.
- In the fifth episode of the fourth season, "Rolling in the Deep" by Adele is played in the beginning during Adrian's walk and at the end of the episode when she is sitting in the empty nursery after punching numerous holes in the wall.
- In the thirteenth episode of the fourth season "S&M" by Rihanna, "Memories" by David Guetta feat. Kid Cudi and "Til ya make it" by "Jamie Lynn Noon" are played at the end of the episode during the dance party.
- At the beginning of first episode of fifth season, when Amy and Ricky went from chapel, is played Bruno Mars' song "Marry You". In the third episode of the fifth season, Amy comes back to school to a flash mob of that song and also received a wedding cake.
- In the last episode when Adrian recollects her school years and relationships is played "Try with Me" by Nicole Scherzinger.
- In the last episode during Ricky's flashback, the song "Blurry" by Puddle of Mudd is played.

== In other media ==
On June 15, 2010, The Secret Diary of Ashley Juergens was published. It was written by Kelly and Courtney Turk, whose previous credits include episodes of 7th Heaven and NCIS. It documents the thoughts of the character Ashley Juergens throughout the events of the first and second seasons. It also includes original characters that were not depicted on Secret Life. While discussing the differences between novel writing and scriptwriting, Turk stated, "We watched the episodes together and then talked briefly about ideas we each had and what we thought Ashley would have to say about whatever the storyline was. Then we separated and exchanged our chapters."
