= The Companion (1994 film) =

1994 American science fiction horror film

- VHS cover
- Genre: Science fiction horror
- Written by: Ian Seeberg
- Directed by: Gary Fleder
- Starring: Kathryn Harrold; Bruce Greenwood
- Music by: David Shire
- Country of origin: United States
- Original language: English

Production
- Producers: Richard Brams; Michael Phillips
- Cinematography: Rick Bota
- Editor: John Carnochan
- Running time: 94 minutes
- Production companies: Michael Phillips Productions; Windy City Productions Inc. MCA Television Entertainment (MTE)

Original release
- Network: USA Network
- Release: October 13, 1994

The Companion is a 1994 American science fiction horror television film directed by Gary Fleder and written by Ian Seeberg. It aired on USA Network on October 13, 1994.

== Plot ==
Gillian, a famous romance novelist, discovers that her boyfriend Alan is cheating on her and leaves him. Her friend Charlene convinces her to purchase a Companion Model G-45, an android with an artificial intelligence personality. Gillian accepts the skills for cooking many varieties of world cuisine (apart from pasta al dente, which is still beyond the reach of the artificial intelligence) as well as the basic first aid skill package, but resists buying any additional sports skills like golf, swimming, and tennis, preferring the most basic model she can obtain. She names her Companion Geoffrey and is pleased by how good he looks. Gillian travels to her mountain cabin with Geoffrey in order to work on her next novel. Annoyed by Geoffrey's consistently identical responses, she decides to reprogram him herself, changing his personality from completely formal to 100% informal and his vocabulary from perfect grammar to slang. She is pleased with the results and grows even more attracted to him. Gillian's ex-boyfriend Alan arrives at the cabin and attempts to woo her back, but she resists. Alan becomes enraged with jealousy by Geoffrey's presence, mistaking him for Gillian's new lover, and aggressively accuses Geoffrey of sleeping with "his" girl. When Gillian asks Geoffrey to make Alan stop, Geoffrey punches Alan in the nose, breaking it. Gillian tells Alan to leave, which he does. On a hike up a cliff, Gillian tells Geoffrey that Romeo & Juliet is probably the greatest love story in all of literature. Geoffrey interprets this to mean that killing yourself out of despair is the ultimate expression of love. Gillian slips off the cliff, but Geoffrey saves her. Gillian later increases Geoffrey's sexuality setting from 0% to 100% and they begin having sex regularly. Gillian is invited to dinner by her neighbors Stacy and Ron, a painter and a sculptor, respectively. At dinner, Geoffrey's awkward responses are noticed by the neighbors, and Gillian confesses that he is a Companion. Geoffrey accompanies Stacy to the kitchen to teach her his lasagna recipe, while Gillian accompanies Ron to his workshop to view his sculptures. Ron flirts with her, but she is uninterested in another cheating man. When Ron attempts to kiss her, Geoffrey arrives and hits Ron with a pole. Gillian and Geoffrey leave as Ron and Stacy argue in the house over what has happened. In an attempt to make Geoffrey more spontaneous, Gillian incorporates the use of "random data", ignoring the warnings issued by the computer. Gillian is initially pleased by his newfound spontaneity. Stacy visits and tells Gillian that Ron destroyed all her paintings after the fight they had the previous night and that she is considering leaving him. After Stacy leaves, Charlene visits the cabin and is disturbed by Gillian's dangerous incorporation of "random data" into Geoffrey's programming as well as by Gillian's new feelings for him and sexual activity with him. Geoffrey tells Charlene that she should leave, so Charlene chooses to walk away from the cabin. Geoffrey drives behind her and offers her a ride, explaining that Gillian is happy now, but Charlene threatens to have him recalled in order to get him away from Gillian. Becoming disturbed by Geoffrey's unpredictability after he destroys her videophone in an attempt to create a perfect life for her isolated in the cabin, Gillian attempts to flee one night. She discovers Charlene's severed head in the backseat of her car. Geoffrey tells her that Charlene was making her upset and cooks a meal for her, which she refuses. She attacks Geoffrey with a poker and injures his face, so he locks her in her room and boards up the windows. When Geoffrey is away, Ron arrives looking for Stacy. He hears Gillian screaming for help and enters the house but is discovered by Geoffrey. The two fight, but Geoffrey kills Ron. Gillian asks Geoffrey to take her to the lake, which he does in the belief that love means wanting the other person to be happy. She enters the lake and pretends to drown, while Geoffrey helplessly wails in despair at his inability to swim and save her. Gillian returns home and takes Ron's keys, then Geoffrey returns and attempts to delete his programming in the ultimate act of love. He notices Gillian watching him and angrily chases her to Ron's house, shouting that she lied to him. Gillian takes a large gun that Ron used to blast away pieces of stone for his artwork and shoots Geoffrey, rendering him inoperative. Gillian's next book, a more dramatic novel that is a departure from her previous idyllic romantic work, ends up receiving critical praise.

== Cast ==
- Kathryn Harrold as Gillian Tanner
- Bruce Greenwood as Geoffrey
- Talia Balsam as Charlene
- Brion James as Ron Cocheran
- Joely Fisher as Stacy
- Bryan Cranston as Alan
- James Karen as Peter Franklin
- Brenda Leigh as Ellen
- Earl Boen as Marty Bailin
- Julian Brams as Technician
- Courtney Taylor as Shelley
- Stacie Randall as Saleswoman
- Tracey Walter as Leo Mirita

== Reception ==
Reviewer Richard Scheib of moriareviews.com gave the film two and a half stars, writing, "Unlike most of androids populating the sundry Terminator copies, this makes some effort to depict an android that behaves in a credible manner. [...] Ultimately though, The Companion disappoints – it is not quite able to leave the killer android amok genre behind it and the latter quarter with Bruce Greenwood going out of control descends increasingly into cliche."

Reviewer Matty Budrewicz of theschlockpit.com wrote, "this sci-fi item, which debuted on the USA Network on 13th October 1994, is a modest treat and Greenwood submits a wonderfully unhinged performance." Praising the director, the reviewer comments that Gary Fleder "infuses the film with a welcome splash of humour that plays up a few now amusingly prescient touches (eBooks! FaceTime!) and possesses a keen eye. Indeed, on a purely aesthetic level, The Companion is a strong contender for one of the best looking small screen epics of its decade. Beginning as a sleek bit of cyberpunk, cinematographer Rick Bota has a ball juxtaposing the standard smoky, Ridley Scott-esque stylistics of the film’s opening reel with the lush sylvan scenery that occupies the bulk of it."

Reviewer David Nusair of reelfilm.com gave the film a rating of two out of four stars, writing, "Though it certainly could have been worse, The Companion should have been better. [...] As the crazed android, fellow Canadian Bruce Greenwood actually does a respectable job - as respectable as any actor can be under the circumstances, I suppose. The problem with The Companion is sheer overlength; this is the sort of story that Twilight Zone used to tell in half the time. But it's competently made (by Gary Fleder, no less - whose Imposter is far worse than this) and well acted, so it might be worth a cheapie rental."

Reviewer Paul Lê of bloody-disgusting.com wrote, "In 1992, Syfy (originally The Sci-Fi Channel) aired Homewrecker, a movie similar to Gary Fleder's The Companion. Both Syfy and USA Network operate under the same parent company, but it made sense to show Homewrecker on the aforesaid channel. The Companion, also about advanced technology gone wrong, has the addition of Bruce Greenwood as the human-like AI stalker. So maybe that's why this telepic was kicked over to USA. Anyway, things here never get as wild as they could have; this is not a body-count horror movie. It's more about the interiority of Kathryn Harrold's heartbroken and complex character."
