= Time Under Fire =

1997 film

- Directed by: Scott P. Levy
- Written by: Tripp Reed; Sean McGinly
- Produced by: Roger Corman; Ashok Amritraj; Andrew Stevens
- Starring: Jeff Fahey; Richard Tyson; Jack Coleman; Bryan Cranston; Linda Hoffman
- Edited by: Brett Hedlund; Dan Holland
- Music by: The Wurst Brothers
- Production company: Royal Oaks Entertainment
- Distributed by: Concorde / New Horizons Home Video
- Release dates: 12 November 1997 (AUS); 1 June 1999 (U.S.)
- Running time: 92 minutes
- Country: United States
- Language: English

Time Under Fire, released in the United States as Beneath the Bermuda Triangle, is a 1997 American science fiction film directed by Scott P. Levy and executive produced by Roger Corman. Released by Royal Oaks Entertainment, the film stars Jeff Fahey as Alan Deakins, a submarine commander whose boat enters a time portal in the Bermuda Triangle and travels 80 years into the future to a dystopian North America.

== Plot ==
In 1990, the naval submarine USS Alabama accidentally enters a portal in the Bermuda Triangle and disappears. Captain Alan Deakins, the submarine's commander, resurfaces several years later claiming to have traveled into the future. The navy refuses to believe him and he is confined to a mental institution. A paranormal research organization headed by Lance McCarty (Jack Coleman) bankrolls an expedition to recreate the circumstances of the accident in order to discover the truth. A government official, Charles Braddock (Bryan Cranston) authorizes Deakins' breakout from a mental institution in order to participate in the expedition. Before leaving, Deakins visits his heartbroken wife, Jeannie (Kimberly Stevens) who, overjoyed to rediscover he is alive, tries to convince him not to leave.

The expedition, including Deakins, McCarty, McCarty's assistant Marjorie (Linda Hoffman), and military men Schmidt (Jay Acovone), Cole (Larry Poindexter), and Hawks (Richard Cummings), leaves the next morning. The submarine successfully enters the portal, and after crossing is attacked and boarded by a military vessel. The leader of the force, Koda (Richard Tyson) claims to recognize Deakins, and captures the crew. In lockup, Deakins meets a man, Spitz (Chick Vennera) who tells them that they are in a post-apocalyptic year 2077, in which the U.S. is ruled by a dictatorship led by Charles Braddock. Deakins' grandson, John (also played by Fahey), is the leader of the rebellion. A guard kills Schmidt for talking back and sexually assaults Marjorie. Deakins kills him after finding out.

Spitz breaks Deakins, Marjorie, and Hawks out of prison. They travel to the rebels' base and meet Alan's grandson John. John explains that Braddock is attempting to create an army of cyborgs who can alter their appearance to look like humans. John enlists their assistance in an assault on Braddock's base to recover the computer chip which is key to the cyborgs' creation. Braddock orders the elder Deakins killed in order to alter the timeline so that John would never be born.

They infiltrate the base, recover the chip, and rescue Lance. John and Cole are believed to have been killed in the escape. However, John reappears to rescue them and they board a submarine in order to cross back into the past. They are pursued by Koda, but destroy his submarine and escape back to 1997. Soon, Spitz notices odd behavior by John, and discovers that he is actually a cyborg clone, who is then destroyed by Alan.

Deakins returns home to Jeannie, who is pregnant (presumably, with John's father). Hawks is revealed to be a traitor, and meets covertly with Braddock to give him the cyborg chip. Braddock then orders Hawks to kill Deakins to prevent the future rebellion. Lance attempts to assassinate Braddock in his office, but after shooting him, discovers that he is a cyborg clone. The real Braddock emerges with a gun to Lance's head. After a brief struggle, Lance finally kills Braddock. Hawks invades Deakins' home, and in the ensuing fight, Jeannie and Hawks are killed.

With Braddock's death, the heroes are assumed to have prevented the impending apocalypse. In an interrogation room, Spitz explains everything to skeptical government officials. However, after Spitz confirms Jeannie's death (thus John's nonexistence), they murder Spitz. The officials are actually working for a surviving cyborg clone of Charles Braddock. However, Spitz did realize shortly after Jeanette’s death that Marjorie is the one that would eventually give birth to John's father, thus ensuring the future rebellion.

== Cast ==
- Jeff Fahey as Alan Deakins / John Deakins
- Richard Tyson as Koda
- Jack Coleman as Lance McCarty
- Bryan Cranston as Charles Braddock
- Linda Hoffman as Marjorie
- Kimberly Stevens as Jeannie Deakins
- Larry Poindexter as Cole
- Richard Cummings as Hawks
- Jay Acovone as Schmidt
- Chick Vennera as Spitz
- Michael Raysses as Sailor
- Rick Batalla as Prentice
- David Weiss as Sonar Operator
- Ben Jurand as Pierce
- Brad Blaisdell as Myron
