= Sin City Rules =

- Jennifer Harman, Lori Montoya, Lana Fuchs, Amy Hanley, and Alicia Jacobs (from left)
- Genre: Reality
- Starring: Alicia Jacobs; Amy Hanley; Jennifer Harman; Lana Fuchs; Lori Montoya
- Country of origin: United States
- Original language: English
- No. of seasons: 1
- No. of episodes: 8

Production
- Executive producers: Ross McCall; Douglas Ross; Greg Stewar; Alex Baskin; Chaz Gray
- Running time: 39 to 42 minutes
- Production company: Evolution Media

Original release
- Network: TLC
- Release: December 9, 2012 – January 1, 2013

Sin City Rules is an American reality television series that debuted December 9, 2012, on TLC. It chronicles the day-to-day lives of five women who reside in Las Vegas, Nevada. Sin City Rules was cancelled due to low viewership, with the last three episodes uploaded to the series website.

== Cast ==
=== Main cast ===
- Lana Fuchs, the owner of a high-end clothing line, concierge service, and a record label. Fuchs has been married for twenty years.
- Amy Hanley, an entrepreneur, the daughter of the deceased Tom Hanley, and author Wendy Mazaros
- Jennifer Harman, a professional poker player
- Alicia Jacobs, a former beauty pageant queen and currently an independent entertainment business reporter.
- Lori Montoya, the owner of a cosmetic line. Montoya and her husband are in the process of opening up the world's first indoor trap range named the Presidential Club.

=== Supporting cast ===
- Kimberly Friedmutter

=== Episodes ===
No.	Title	Original release date	US viewers (millions)
1	"What Happens in Vegas..."	December 9, 2012	0.830
Drama draw the group of women into a strong divide.
2	"Whine Tasting"	December 16, 2012	0.727
Due to the paranormal activity taking place in her office, Amy hires a medium to depict the strange happenings. Lori hosts a meeting for Lana and Alica to resolve their drama, and Jen has a difficult time handling her personal life and her career.
3	"She Said, She Said"	December 23, 2012	0.497
Amy is inviting the ladies to her mother Wendy's party, Amy explains to the ladies how to be respectful since the party is being held in The Mob Museum. Lana is approached by Alicia to become friends at the party once again, but Lana doesn't agree, which turns into a big brawl inside The Mob Museum. Jen is debating what to do with her life, while on the receiving end of extremely pitiful news.
4	"Aliens Among Us"	December 30, 2012	N/A
Alicia has pushed Lana over the edge, which prompts Lana to find the hidden truth behind Alica's past. Lana then asks Alicia to meet with her and discuss her employment. Alicia lies to Lana about her employment. Lana has proof Alicia has lied about her employment. Amy ends up agreeing with Alicia, and ends up feuding with Lana too. Lori and Lisa are invited by Lana for a 50th birthday celebration.
5	"Let's Call a Truce"	January 1, 2013	0.415
Jen has a difficult time coping with an abnormal health condition. Lana finds out that Amy has realized what is going on and sets-up a night to release the tension, in hopes to create peace. Alicia invites everyone over for brunch to inform the ladies about her career status. Alicia explains to everyone she misinformed everyone about her employment, yet states she is an independent contractor reporter for the media outlet's in Las Vegas. Note: This is the first episode to air on Tuesday at 10/9c.
6	"A Nice Little Ambush"	N/A	TBD
Alicia attempts to revitalize her work life. While the girls have a night to resolve issues, Amy tells the group about things that are occurring in her personal life. Since Amy reveals all of her troubles, Lori invites Amy to lunch so they can have a heart-to-heart without the group present. Lori has an alternative motive and texts Lana who arrives with a group of people who put Amy down. Amy flees the restaurant after the brutal unjust attack and is pushed by Lana's sister.
7	"Family Ties"	N/A	TBD
The incident with the other girls puts Amy in a tailspin, but she focuses on her new business rather than the drama. Jen and Marco start planning to renew their vows. Lana prepares for her birthday party, located in Los Angeles. Alica lands a gig with a local news station.
8	"Lies, Love, and Loyalty"	N/A	TBD
Alicia and Lana sit down for lunch to discuss the threats Lana has been receiving on social media sites. Jennifer and her Italian husband, Marco, take the ladies to the spot where they met. Everyone then goes to a remote desert area where a ceremony is being held for Jennifer and Marco to renew their wedding vows.
