= Excessive Force II: Force on Force =

- DVD cover
- Directed by: Jonathan Winfrey
- Written by: Mark Sevi
- Produced by: Paul Hertzberg
- Starring: Stacie Randall; Dan Gauthier; Bradford Tatum; David Hugghins; Michael Wiseman
- Cinematography: Russ Brandt
- Edited by: Nina Gilberti
- Music by: Kevin Kiner
- Production company: CineTel Pictures
- Distributed by: New Line Home Video
- Release date: August 29, 1995
- Running time: 88 minutes
- Country: United States
- Language: English

Excessive Force II: Force on Force is a 1995 American direct-to-video action film starring Stacie Randall and Dan Gauthier. It was written by Mark Sevi and directed by Jonathan Winfrey. The film is a sequel to Excessive Force (1993), despite not bearing any relation to the original movie or its storyline.

Excessive Force II: Force on Force was released by New Line Home Video on August 29, 1995.

== Plot ==
Harly Cordell is an agent looking for revenge against her ex-boyfriend, now a criminal, who tried to kill her by shooting her in the head.

== Cast ==
- Stacie Randall as Agent Harly Cordell
- Dan Gauthier as Francis Lydell
- Bradford Tatum as Yates
- David Hugghins as Martinez
- Michael Wiseman as Bobby Tucci
- Henry Brown as Captain John Buchanan
- John Sanderford as Agent Tom Harris
- Jay Patterson as Detective Wayne O'Conner
- Cyril O'Reilly as Deacon
- Anthony T. Pennello as Ingram
- Anthony Paul as Mario
- Steven Kravitz as Paulie
- James Lew as Lee
- Ray Colbert as Agent Denon
- Mandingo Warrior as Ernie
- Rick Tyler Barnes as Jimeson
- Joe Maruzzo as Bartholomew "Barty D" D'Amato
- John Mese as Dr. David Prender
- Lisa Melilli as Miss McCarthy
- Dan Lauria as Orlando Franco
- Tom Wright as Grant Thompson
- Terri J. Vaughn as Grace

== Reception ==
TV Guide gave the film two out of four stars and stated: "The original Excessive Force was a ridiculous vehicle for low-level action star Thomas Ian Griffith; that film's only virtue was its colorful supporting cast. This film (originally written as a stand-alone project) is easier to take seriously, but lacks much in the way of colorful details to distract from its generic plot. The cast, writer Mark Sevi and director Jonathan Winfrey (a veteran of the Roger Corman stable) do what is expected of them, but their work lacks the spark that would set this movie apart from the countless other action mini-epics crowding the video shelves." "Monster Hunter" wrote: "It’s as forgettable as its star (Randall has numerous credits, but has anyone ever been in so many sequels with the number "4" in the title?) and you'll find yourself sympathizing with the wooziness Harly's head trauma causes her as you struggle through this one. It can't even muster up the perverse entertainment of the laughably bad Thomas Ian Griffith unrelated predecessor, Excessive Force." Scott Weinberg from DVD Talk gave it two out of five stars, stating: "Notable for being the only movie in the history of cinema to use the word "force" three times in its title, Excessive Force II: Force on Force is your ultra-standard lady-cop ass-kick cable flick chestnut. It offers not one whiff of an iota of originality or real craftsmanship, but for what it is, EC2 delivers the goods with only a minimum of unintentional hilarity." Mitch Lovell from "The Video Vacuum" gave it two and a half stars and said: "Overall, I think Excessive Force II: Force on Force is about on par with its predecessor. It doesn't have that film's great supporting cast, but I think it's a better made film than the original. It's not great, but as far as Part 2's go, you can do a lot worse. And as far as movies with the word "Force" in the title go, this is about as good as it gets."
