= Stacie Randall =

American actress

Stacie Randall is an American actress, best known for her roles in Puppet Master 4, Trancers 4 and Trancers 5, and Excessive Force II: Force on Force. She is currently married to Jack Allocco.

== Filmography ==
Year	Title	Role
1993	Puppet Master 4	Dr. Leslie Piper
1994	Trancers 4: Jack of Swords	Lyra
1994	Silk Stalkings	Myrna Stoner
1994	Ghoulies IV	Alexandra
1994	The Companion (TV)	Saleswoman
1994	Trancers 5: Sudden Deth	Lyra
1995	High Tomb	Heather, Mary, Jessica
1995	Teresa's Tattoo	Kay
1995	Dream a Little Dream 2	Lena Drago
1995	Excessive Force II: Force on Force	Harly Cordell
1996	The Assault	Stacy
1996	Demolition High	Dugan
1997	First Encounter	
1997	The Beneficiary (TV)	Young Jane Ellington
1997	Evil Obsession	Liz
1998	Together & Alone	Laura
1998	ChiPs ‘99 (TV)	Officer Sandy Baker
1998	Detour	Inga
1999	The Blair Fish Project	Blair
1999	From Dusk Till Dawn 2: Texas Blood Money	Marcy
1999	The Incredible Genie	Sandra Alexander
2000	V.I.P.	
2000–01	Gotham Girls (Web)	Zatanna
2001	Ticker	SWAT Team Commander
2008	Meet Market	Sunny
