= Mark Derwin =

American film and television actor

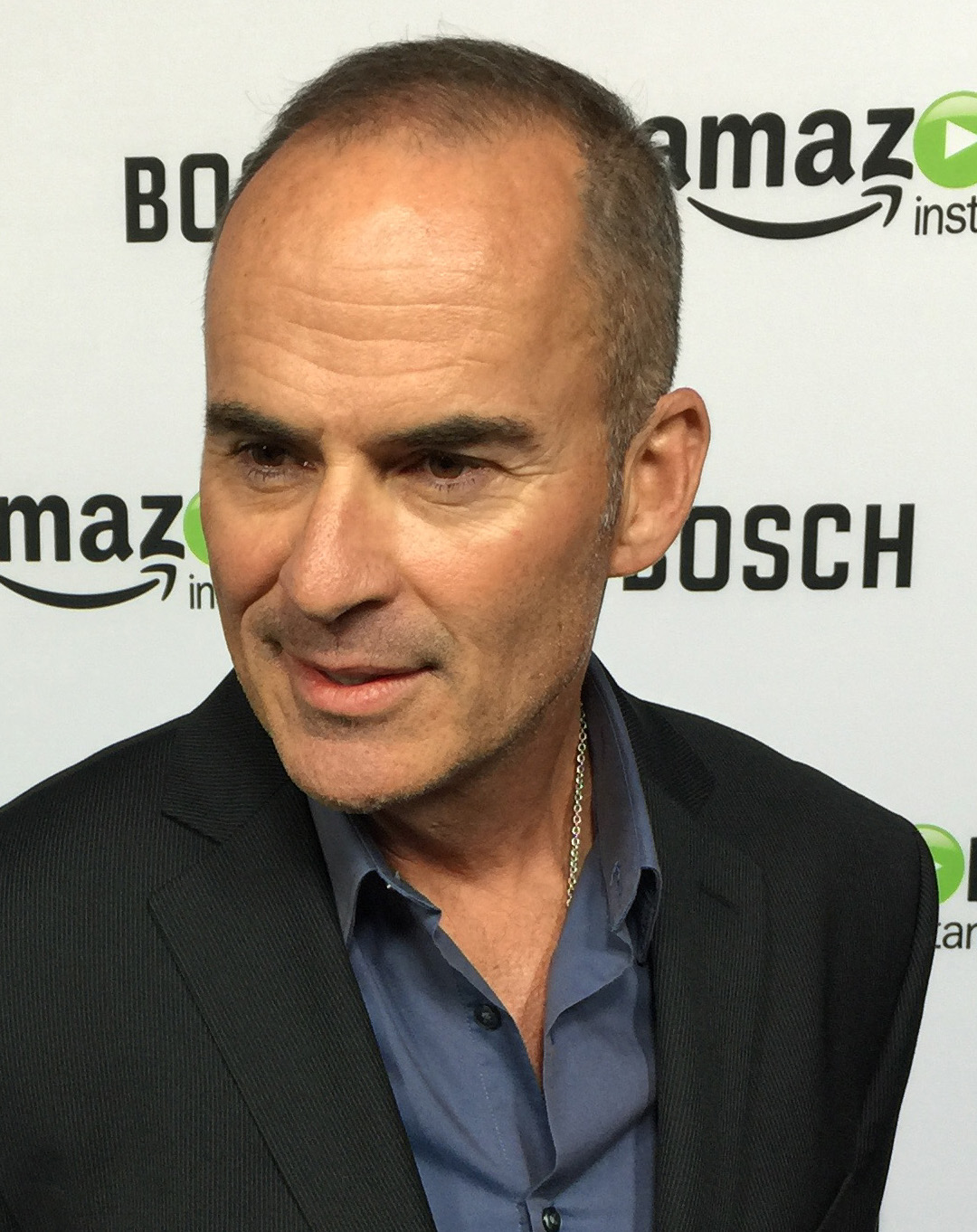
- Derwin in 2015
- Born: October 28, 1960 (age 65); Park Forest, Illinois, U.S.
- Occupation: Actor
- Years active: 1987–present

Mark Derwin (born October 28, 1960) is an American film and television actor. Derwin began his career on Days of Our Lives in 1987 with a minor role as Jeremiah Brown. In 1988, Derwin appeared in the role of Adrian Hunter on The Young and the Restless. Derwin was featured in a high-profile storyline: the elaborate George Rawlins murder mystery as the scheming psychotic serial killer. Derwin is also known for numerous other soap opera roles, most famously as the original A.C. Mallet on Guiding Light and Ben Davidson on One Life to Live. From 2008-2013 Derwin was a lead on the ABC Family teen drama the Secret Life of the American Teenager as George Juergens, a furniture store owner married to Molly Ringwald's character Ann, and the father of the main character Amy played by Shailene Woodley. The main plot of the show is Derwin's character's 15-year old daughter having a child after a one night stand at a summer band camp and the developments this event has on those around her.

== Biography ==
Derwin grew up in North Salem, NY and graduated from North Salem High School. He attended the State University of New York at Cobleskill, but was kicked out after one semester. He briefly worked at IBM and worked a series of odd jobs before moving to Los Angeles.

After recurring roles on the shows Hardball and Days of Our Lives, and a prolific career in commercials (including a notable spot as the "Fiesta" cigarette man in Mexico), Derwin was cast in his first contract role as Adrian Hunter on the daytime soap opera The Young and the Restless. Derwin was on the show from 1989 to 1990, and was featured in a high-profile storyline where his character played a grifter and, ultimately, a murderer.

His next role was on the long-running soap opera Guiding Light as detective A.C. Mallet. Derwin played the character from 1990 to 1993. During his time there, the role of Mallet became a leading character. Derwin became romantically involved with costar Beth Ehlers during his stint at GL; the couple decided to leave the show together in 1993. (Derwin and Ehlers subsequently broke up.)

Derwin returned to daytime television in the role of Dr. Ben Davidson on the ABC soap opera One Life to Live (1999–2002, 2004, 2008). He was again paired in a high-profile leading role, this time as the love interest of the show's star, Erika Slezak. His character was eventually discovered to be the son of show patriarch Asa Buchanan.

Derwin co-starred alongside Bonnie Hunt in the non-traditional primetime sitcom, Life with Bonnie, which was partly improvised. He was seen in the teen comedy Accepted (2006), playing the father of protagonist Bartleby Gaines (played by Justin Long).

In 2006, 2007 and 2014, he was seen on How I Met Your Mother, playing Greg. Derwin also played George Juergens on the ABC Family TV show The Secret Life of the American Teenager from 2008 to 2013. In 2008, he appeared on the show Chuck on the episode "Chuck Versus the Marlin" where he played Detective Conway. In 2009 he had a recurring role on season 7 of 24 as Secretary of State Joe Stevens, a member of President Allison Taylor's (played by Cherry Jones) Cabinet. In 2011, he appeared on Hot in Cleveland in the episode "How I Met My Mother", playing a paroled convict. In 2013, Derwin portrayed Pierre Cossette in "To Have and To Hold", episode 4 of season 6 of Mad Men.

== Filmography ==
Year	Title	Role	Notes
1996	Evil Obsession	Damon	
1999	The Minus Man	Creech	
1999	Ballad of the Nightingale	Alan Blake	
2005	Laura Smiles	Mark	
2005	Dirty Deeds	Vincent Scarno	
2006	Accepted	Jack Gaines	
2009	Balancing the Books	David	
2015	Everest	Lou Kasischke	
2018	Bad Company	Mike	
