= A Connecticut Yankee in King Arthur's Court (1921 film) =

1921 film

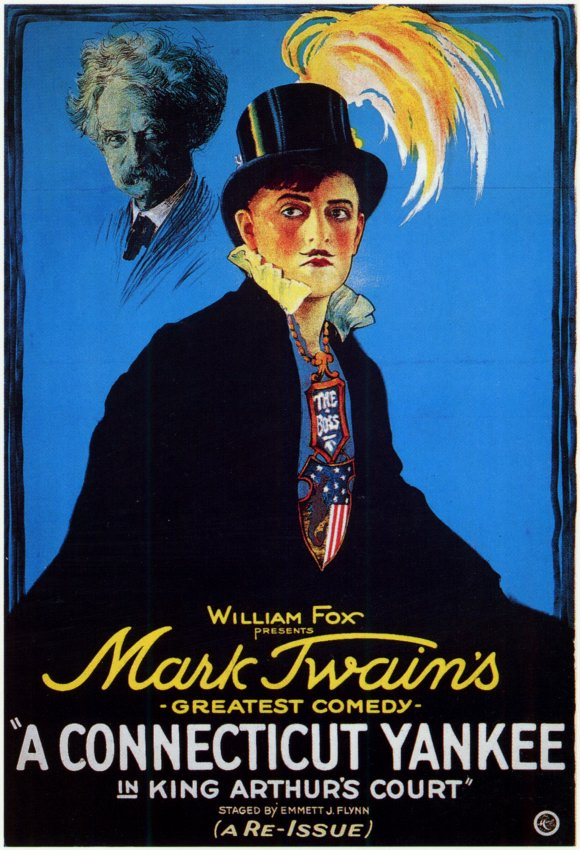
- Theatrical poster featuring star Harry Myers with the spirit of Mark Twain peering over his shoulder
- Directed by: Emmett J. Flynn
- Written by: Bernard McConville
- Based on: A Connecticut Yankee in King Arthur's Court; 1889 novel by Mark Twain
- Produced by: William Fox
- Starring: Harry Myers; Pauline Starke; Rosemary Theby; George Siegmann
- Cinematography: Lucien Andriot
- Edited by: C.R. Wallace
- Distributed by: Fox Film
- Release date: March 14, 1921
- Running time: 80+ minutes 8 reels (8,291 feet)
- Country: United States
- Language: Silent (English intertitles)

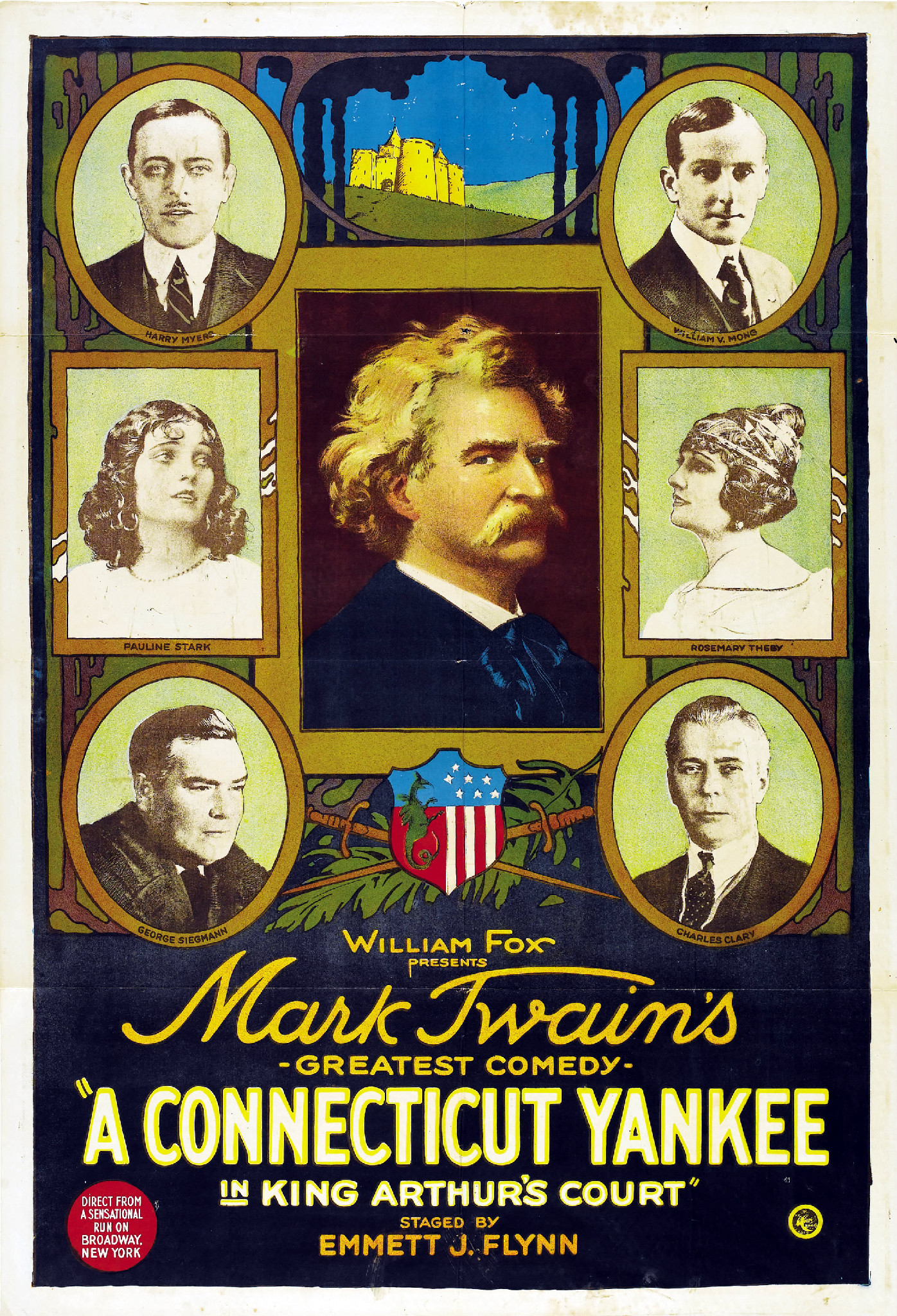
Poster for the 1921 film

A Connecticut Yankee in King Arthur's Court is a 1921 American silent film adaptation of Mark Twain's 1889 novel A Connecticut Yankee in King Arthur's Court. The film was produced by the Fox Film Corporation (later 20th Century Fox) and directed by Emmett J. Flynn based on a screenplay by Bernard McConville. It is notable as the first film adaptation of Twain's novel and as the second film about time travel to the past (after The Ghost of Slumber Mountain).

The film stars Harry Myers as the titular Yankee Martin Cavendish. After reading Twain's novel, Cavendish dreams that he, like Twain's protagonist Henry Morgan, is transported back to the time of King Arthur (Charles Clary), where he must use modern know-how to outwit the king's foes Morgan le Fay (Rosemary Theby) and Merlin (William V. Mong). The screenplay modernizes the novel with many contemporary references, including mentions of Ford Model Ts, the Volstead Act, and the Battle of the Argonne Forest. The film was popular, and its success likely encouraged Fox to produce the later sound film adaptation of the novel, A Connecticut Yankee. According to author Barbara Leaming, the film's hanging scene inspired Tom Hepburn, brother of Katharine Hepburn, to commit suicide in 1921.

The film is incomplete in the Library of Congress, and only reels 2, 4 and 7 survive.

== Cast ==
- Harry Myers as Martin Cavendish (as Harry C. Myers)
- Pauline Starke as Sandy
- Rosemary Theby as Queen Morgan le Fay
- Charles Clary as King Arthur
- William V. Mong as Merlin the Magician
- George Siegmann as Sir Sagramore
- Charles Gordon as Clarence, the Page
- Karl Formes as Mark Twain
- Herbert Fortier as Mr. Cavendish
- Adele Farrington as Mrs. Cavendish
- Wilfred McDonald as Sir Lancelot

== Reception ==
The film was the seventh-biggest hit of 1922 in the US and Canada.
