= Trancers 5: Sudden Deth =

- Theatrical release poster
- Directed by: David Nutter
- Written by: Peter David
- Produced by: Oana Paunescu; Vlad Paunescu
- Starring: Tim Thomerson; Stacie Randall; Ty Miller; Terri Ivens; Mark Arnold; Clabe Hartley; Alan Oppenheimer; Jeff Moldovan; Stephen Macht
- Cinematography: Aldofo Bartoli
- Edited by: Lisa Bromwell
- Music by: Gary Fry
- Production company: Full Moon Pictures
- Distributed by: Paramount Pictures; Full Moon Entertainment
- Release date: November 9, 1994
- Running time: 73 minutes
- Country: United States
- Language: English

Trancers 5: Sudden Deth is a 1994 American sci-fi fantasy adventure film written by Peter David, directed by David Nutter, and starring Tim Thomerson as the time-traveling "trancer hunter" Jack Deth. It marked, to date, Thomerson's last appearance as Jack Deth, excluding stock footage in Trancers 6 and his cameo in Evil Bong.

The film has been released on DVD through the Trancers boxset.

== Synopsis ==
Jack is back for one more round with the Trancers. Jack Deth must attempt to find his way home from the other-dimensional world of Orpheus, where magic works and the Trancers were the ruling class (before Trancers 4: Jack of Swords, that is). Jack's quest to find the mystical Tiamond in the Castle of Unrelenting Terror may be thwarted by the return of Caliban, King of the Trancers, who was once thought dead.

== Cast ==
- Tim Thomerson as Jack Deth
- Stacie Randall as Lyra
- Ty Miller as Prospero
- Terri Ivens as Shaleen
- Mark Arnold as Lucius
- Clabe Hartley as Lord Caliban
- Alan Oppenheimer as Farr
- Jeff Moldovan as Harson
- Stephen Macht as Harris
- Luana Stoica as Celia
- Rona Hartner as Tessa
- Ion Haiduc as Angelo
- Mihai Dinvale as Defiant Noble

== Production ==
Trancers 5: Sudden Deth was filmed at the same time as the previous movie Trancers 4: Jack of Swords.

== Home media ==
Trancers 5: Sudden Deth was released on VHS and LaserDisc in 1994, DVD in 2012, and Blu-ray in 2022.
