= Trancers 4: Jack of Swords =

- Theatrical release poster
- Directed by: David Nutter
- Written by: Peter David
- Produced by: Oana Paunescu; Vlad Paunescu
- Starring: Tim Thomerson; Stacie Randall; Ty Miller; Terri Ivens; Mark Arnold; Clabe Hartley; Alan Oppenheimer; Lochlyn Munro; Jeff Moldovan; Stephen Macht
- Cinematography: Adolfo Bartoli
- Edited by: Lisa Bromwell
- Music by: Gary Fry
- Distributed by: Paramount Pictures; Full Moon Entertainment
- Release date: February 2, 1994
- Running time: 83 minutes
- Country: United States
- Language: English

Trancers 4: Jack of Swords is a 1994 American sci-fi fantasy adventure film starring Tim Thomerson as Jack Deth. The film also features Stephen Macht and Stacie Randall. It was filmed back-to-back with Trancers 5: Sudden Deth in and around a castle in Romania that was also used in another Full Moon Entertainment produced film series called Subspecies. The film has been released on DVD through the Trancers boxset.

== Synopsis ==
Following his adventures in the Los Angeles of the 1980s, Jack Deth (Tim Thomerson) has returned to his own time, the 23rd century. Having lost his first wife Lena, and finding out that he's lost his other wife Alice to none other than Harris, Deth agrees to another assignment in the past.

While heading out for another assignment, something (a Solonoid from a previous assignment) hiding in the time portal causes the TCL chamber to go awry. Jack finds himself in a whole new dimension, a kingdom of the technological level of medieval Europe. The physics of this world render most of Deth's technological devices nonfunctional. Here, he meets a parallel to Trancers called Nobles, who subsist on the life force of the mortals indigenous to this world.

Jack assists a rebel group known as the Tunnel Rats, who desire to overthrow the villainous Lord Caliban (Clabe Hartley). The leaders of the Nobles' son, Prospero (Ty Miller) rebels against the other aristocrats. To stop the Trancers of this world, and return himself to his own dimension, Jack must quest to find the mystical Diamond in the Castle of Unrelenting Terror, an item which Lord Caliban is also hunting. The movie ends on a cliffhanger.

== Cast ==
- Tim Thomerson as Jack Deth
- Stacie Randall as Lyra
- Ty Miller as Prospero
- Terri Ivens as Shaleen
- Mark Arnold as Lucius
- Clabe Hartley as Lord Caliban
- Alan Oppenheimer as Farr
- Lochlyn Munro as Sebastian
- Jeff Moldovan as Harson
- Stephen Macht as Harris
- Ruxandra Enescu as Titania
- Adrian Pintea as Borgia
- Rona Hartner as Tessa
- Ion Haiduc as Angelo
- Razvan Popa as Provost
- Crinuta Popescu as Caliban's Girl
- Costel Constantin as The Torturer
- Mihai Dinvale as Crossbow Noble
- Jacqueline R. Clay as The Bartender
- Albu Ioan as Solonoid #1
- Jake Roberts as Solonoid #2
- Jake McKinnon as Chlourofiend (uncredited)

== Reception ==
Entertainment Weekly found the film a bore and stated that fans of the first three Trancers movies would be disappointed. However, Creature Feature gave the film 3 out of 5 stars, rating it higher than the first three movies. TV Guide gave the movie two stars, saying the sequel does as well as can be imagined and praised Thomerson's acting, calling him an "underappreciated physical comedian". Peter David's Silver gave the movie 2.5 out of 5 stars when judged on the B-Movie scale and 2 out of 5 stars when judged on a general scale. They noted that the movie was funnier than its predecessors, but that the acting outside of Thomerson's left much to be desired. It was recommended for fans of the series.

== Production ==
Full Moon Entertainment moved its studios to Romania as post-Soviet film tax incentives were too great to resist. This benefit accounted for the change of setting. It was filmed at the same time as Trancers V. The stunt work was noted as impressive, and obtained much cheaper by local talent than would cost in America. Also offered cheaper were sound stages, waivers of location fees and extras working very cheaply.

== Home media ==
Trancers 4: Jack of Swords was released on VHS and LaserDisc in 1994, DVD in 2012, and Blu-ray in 2022.
