= Daily Millions =

1990s US lottery game

Daily Millions was a US lottery game administered by the Multi-State Lottery Association (MUSL). It was available in some of the jurisdictions that sell MUSL's most popular game, Powerball; membership fluctuated during the period when it was available. It began in September 1996 and was discontinued in March 1998. The game was drawn daily, including Sundays.

Players paid US$1 for each game, which consisted of six numbers. Two numbers each were drawn from three colored number fields, each numbered from 1 through 21. The balls were dyed in the shades of the American flag; red, white, and blue, and drawn from three drum hoppers. Players won by matching at least two of the six numbers, regardless of which color drum(s) the matching balls came from. Matching all six won $1 million, which was cash, rather than annuitized.

The name "Daily Millions" was chosen since MUSL believed the game would be popular enough for the association to award, on average, at least one $1 million prize per drawing. Top prize winners, however, were unexpectedly rare. The game jokingly became known as "Daily Miracle", perhaps because it survived as long as it did.

In June 2002, Kansas and Nebraska started 2by2, which is played much like Daily Millions was, except players choose from two sets of 26 numbers each (red and white; the same colors as in Powerball). North Dakota became 2by2's third member in 2006, Wyoming in March 2021, and Idaho in April 2021, but ended participation in August 2022.
