= 2by2 =

American lottery game

- Formation: 2002; 24 years ago
- Location: United States
- Owner: Multi-State Lottery Association
- Website: www.powerball.com/2by2

2by2 is a lottery game offered in Kansas, Nebraska, North Dakota, and Wyoming. It is drawn nightly at the Iowa headquarters of the Multi-State Lottery Association (MUSL). Kansas and Nebraska started the game in 2002; North Dakota joined in 2006, with Wyoming added on March 14, 2021. Idaho joined on April 18, 2021, but ended participation on August 26, 2022.

Players choose two numbers from 1 through 26 in each of two number fields (red and white). Only one match (in either field) is needed to win. The top prize of $22,000, originally $20,000 (which is fixed, rather than a jackpot), is won by matching all four numbers.

Players who buy a ticket good for seven consecutive drawings(or increments of 7 draws: 7, 14, 21, 28, 35 or 42) are eligible for a doubling of the top prize (to $44,000) if the top prize is won on a Tuesday.

MUSL, from 1996 to 1998, offered a similar game called Daily Millions, with a grand prize of $1 million cash. Daily Millions had red, white, and blue number fields, in which players chose two numbers of each color.

The Arizona-only game 2by2, begun in 2009, was played in the same manner; it had a top prize of $20,000. The Arizona version of 2by2 held its final drawing on May 17, 2014; it was replaced by All or Nothing, of which it joined several versions of that game, including one played in both Minnesota and Iowa.

== Paytable and odds for a $1 wager ==
Matches	Prize	2by2 Tuesday Prize	Probability of winning
One Red	Free Ticket	2 Free Tickets	1:8
One White	Free Ticket	2 Free Tickets	1:8
One Red and One White	$3	$6	1:45.8
Two Red	$3	$6	1:382.7
Two White	$3	$6	1:382.7
Two Red and One White	$100	$200	1:2,200.5
Two White and One Red	$100	$200	1:2,200.5
Two Red and Two White	$22,000	$44,000	1:105,625
