= Prairie Band Casino & Resort =

Casino resort in Mayetta, Kansas

- Interactive map of Prairie Band Casino & Resort
- Location: 12305 150th Road Mayetta, Kansas; 39°18′55″N 95°45′04″W
- Opened: January 1998
- No. of rooms: 297
- Gaming space: 35,000 sq ft (3,300 m^{2})
- Notable restaurants: Longhouse Buffet, Buffalo Grill, Three Fires Steakhouse
- Casino type: Native American casino
- Owner: Prairie Band Potawatomi Nation
- Previous names: Harrah's Prairie Band
- Renovated in: 2008, 2018-
- Website: Casino & Resort Website

Prairie Band Casino & Resort is a Native American casino in Mayetta, Kansas, owned by the Prairie Band Potawatomi Nation. It was originally operated by Harrah's Entertainment under a management agreement with the tribe until July 1, 2007, when the tribe took over operations. The casino is open 24 hours daily and has a 35,000-square-foot (3,300 m^{2}) casino, with 1,090 slot machines, a bingo hall and 31 table games. The casino also has three restaurants and 297 guestrooms.

== History ==
=== Under Harrah's management ===
The casino and resort opened in 1998 as the first full-service casino in the state of Kansas. When it opened on January 12, 1998, the entertainment complex was 63,000 square-feet. As of 2000, a billboard on U.S. Highway 75 traveling north from Topeka read "Harrah's Prairie Band Casino, 12 miles." At the time, after opening, the 100-room hotel adjacent to the casino was "generally full" with reservations recommended. It was the only of the four casinos in Kansas at the time that had a hotel.

=== Transition to new management ===
In May 2005, the casino announced that Harrah's would not be renewing its management contract, which expired in January 2008. In May 2007, the casino unveiled a new name and logo after it prepared to assume complete control from Harrah's. The new logo featured "a flame, a traditional Potawatomi symbol, and a diamond to represent gaming." The transition from Harrah's to the tribe took place on July 1, 2007, with the casino renamed Prairie Band Casino and Resort. Management for Harrah's Prairie Band Casino-Topeka transferred to the tribe on July 1, 2007, which was ahead of the scheduled termination date by nine months.

In April 2007, Harrah's Prairie Band Casino in Mayetta was the largest casino in Kansas. Earlier that year, the Prairie Band Potawatomi Nation sued the state of Kansas in a bid to stop legislation that would allow four state casinos and slot machines at horse and dog tracks.

In August 2008, Prairie Band filed a lawsuit against Harrah's to enforce a non-compete agreement with Harrah's, after Harrah's involved itself in a proposed casino in Sumner County. The Lottery Gaming Facility Review Board throughout 2008 reviewed proposals for a contract to develop and manage a state-owned casino in Kansas - in August 2008, the Prairie Band Potwatomi Nation sued Harrah's for submitting a bid, alleging that in doing so, Harrah's "violated a noncompete agreement with the tribe" related to Prairie Band Casino & Resort, which Harrah's denied.

After the tribe opened the casino in 1998, and added the nearby The Nation Station gas station in 1999. The casino was then expanded in 2000 and 2004, with a hotel and convention center added in 2004. Jacob Wamego became Prairie Band LLC president and CEO in January 2017.

=== Remodel and coronavirus ===
In January 2018, the resort announced a "massive expansion" including a new hotel tower with 80 rooms, among them a pool, spa and fitness center, party rooms, and rooms. It also announced a 500-space parking garage to be connected to the event center. The casino announced the casino floor would be remodeled and expanded, with the lobby and Buffalo Grill also remodeled. It was said the renovations would take 2.5 years. The initial casino remodel was finished in October 2018 after "years of planning and weeks of construction," with the tower and game room expansion still pending. In July 2019, the casino announced it was moving into Phase 2 of construction, and would be breaking ground on new facilities. The plans had been changed to include 74 new guest rooms, pools both indoor and outdoor, a sauna and steam room, business meeting rooms, and a game room with "virtual Top Golf," as well as party rooms. At the time, the casino remained a "wholly owned subsidiary of the Prairie Band Potawatomi Nation." Plans for Phase 2 included a new lobby bar, a Kapi coffee bar, and the Embers Bar and Grille.

Due to coronavirus, on March 17, 2020, the Potawatomi Tribal Council directed the casino to suspend operations until March 20, 2020. The casino continued to pay wages and benefits for part-time and full-time employees, it stated, with hotel reservations refunded. After announcing the closure mandate on March 17, 2020, on March 27, the Kansas Lottery extended the suspension of state casino operations for Hollywood Casino, Kansas Crossing, Crossing, Kansas Star Casino, and Boot Hill Casino. That week, Prairie Band Casino & Resort extended its own closures through April 30, although not required to follow the mandate. When the casino reopened in June 2020, it had a number of restrictions.

== Hotel and casino ==
The casino is open 24 hours daily and has 35,000-square-foot (3,300 m^{2}) of gaming space, with 1,090 slot machines, a bingo hall, 31 table games, and a poker room. The casino also has three restaurants: Longhouse Buffet, Embers Bar & Grille, and 3 Fires Steakhouse. It also has 297 guestrooms.

== Entertainment ==
Country musician Gary Allan appeared at the resort to perform in 2021, after first performing in June 2019. Musician Lee Greenwood performed in April 2022. As of 2022, the upcoming March lineup included artists such as KC and the Sunshine Band and comedian George Lopez.

== See also ==
- List of casinos in Kansas
