= Louisiana Lottery Corporation =

Lottery in Louisiana, United States

The Louisiana Lottery Corporation (LLC) is a government-run lottery that is used to generate revenue without increasing taxes. The proceeds of the Lottery go to the Minimum Foundation Program that funds public education in Louisiana. The daily activities involved with running the cooperation are handled by the president of the Louisiana Lottery Cooperation. The president is under the supervision of the Lottery's nine-member governing board of directors.

The Lottery offers full and part-time employment in a total of 6 different cities in the State of Louisiana. Over half of the Lottery sales are for prize expenses. Not only does the government receive revenue from the Lottery, but businesses do as well. The minimum age to purchase a ticket is 21 years olds. However, to sell or receive a Lottery ticket there is no minimum age.

All drawings are conducted at the Lottery headquarters in downtown Baton Rouge using automated drawing machines, and they are videotaped. Drawings happen every evening (excluding some holidays). The LLC uses three methods to choose random numbers for each of the Lottery's games. Before each drawing, the drawing method and machine are selected randomly. There are a total of 7 in-house games that could be played. Winners that are U.S. citizens are subject to Louisiana income tax withholding and can also have federal tax withheld if winnings are $5,000 or more.

== History ==
Lotteries have been popular in the United States since the early days of colonialism. In 1868, a group of entrepreneurs began a private business, the Louisiana State Lottery Company. It promised to donate $40,000 annually for 25 years to Charity Hospital in New Orleans in exchange for the hospital not having to pay taxes. Tickets were sold nationwide to make it the largest lottery in the country. The lottery was noted during its early years of operation for its fairness. The company invited Confederate generals and adopted an elaborate mechanical system for its monthly draws. The player who won the largest prize in its 40-year history was a barber, who took home $300,000 (about $30 million today).

After the Civil War, there was a decline in state-sponsored lotteries due to the national backlash against gambling. During the 1890s, Louisiana was the only remaining state operating a lottery, through the Louisiana State Lottery Company. It had a monopoly of legalized gambling that its operations extended outside of state boundaries. The company closed in 1894 after allegations of corruption. It moved to Honduras, ending 22 years later.

The modern Louisiana Lottery Corporation began in 1991, after the 1990 Louisiana legislature proposed a government-run lottery (ACT 1045) as a way to generate revenue without increasing taxes. Due to the Lottery's unique operations, the Legislature recognized a corporate structure would suit it best.

Voters also liked the idea, passing a constitutional amendment in 1990 creating the LLC by a 69% to 31% margin. In 2003, voters passed another constitutional amendment to dedicate Lottery proceeds to the Minimum Foundation Program that funds public education in Louisiana.

The president of the Louisiana Lottery Corporation handles the daily activities involved with running the corporation under the supervision of the Lottery's nine-member governing board of directors. Board members are appointed to staggered terms from each of Louisiana's seven congressional districts; one member is chosen from a list of five candidates submitted by the Louisiana Oil Marketers and Convenience Store Association; and one member is appointed at-large. Each member is appointed by the governor and confirmed by the Louisiana Senate before beginning a four-year term. Louisiana's treasurer serves as an ex-officio board member.

== Operations ==
To ensure the highest level of accountability, the following have varying degrees of oversight over the corporation, including its budget, drawings and administrative rules.

- Governor of Louisiana
- Joint Legislative Committee on the Budget
- Senate Judiciary B Committee
- House Committee on Administration of Criminal Justice
- Attorney General
- Board of Directors

In addition to an annual "clean bill of health" from the Legislative Auditor, the LLC continues to receive national recognition for excellence in financial reporting. The LLC ranks first among jurisdictional lotteries for percentage of revenue transferred to its government. Operating solely from self-generated revenue, the Lottery contributes more than $100 million yearly to the Minimum Foundation Program that funds public education in Louisiana.

=== Staffing and offices ===
The Lottery employs a total of about 140 people (full-time and part-time) in its downtown Baton Rouge headquarters, distribution center, as well as in its regional offices in New Orleans, Lafayette, Alexandria, Shreveport, and Monroe. Regional staff process and pay winning tickets and support Lottery retailers, including training, monitoring product inventory and point-of-sale opportunities, assisting with in-store promotions resolving problems, explain new games and changes, and ensuring compliance with Lottery rules. Operational management functions, including sales, accounting, auditing, marketing, public relations, human resources, security, and information systems, are conducted from the Lottery's corporate headquarters. The Lottery's distribution center oversees inventory management and instant ticket order fulfillment.

=== Distribution of monetary funds ===
More than half of Lottery sales are reserved for prize expenses. Prizes not claimed are returned to winners in the form of increased payouts on scratch-off tickets. Players have won more than $2.8 billion in Lottery prizes since the Lottery's inception.

The Lottery statute mandates that 35 percent of all Lottery revenue be transferred to Louisiana's treasury. Effective July 1, 2004, the Louisiana constitution provides that Lottery proceeds be earmarked for the Minimum Foundation Program, which funds public education in Louisiana. In addition, the first $500,000 in annual Lottery proceeds are earmarked for the Louisiana Department of Health and Hospitals-Office of Addictive Disorders to fund problem gambling programs.

As of July 2009, the Lottery has transferred over $2 billion to Louisiana's treasury. In fiscal year 2009, more than $135.9 million was transferred, which is the highest amount since 1993. The LLC ranks first among U.S. lotteries in percentage of revenue transferred to its government.

More than 2,700 businesses in Louisiana earn a 5 percent commission on the sale of Lottery products as licensed retailers. In addition to revenue from commission, retailers earn an incentive of up 2 percent for cashing winning tickets up to $600. Retailers are also paid a selling bonus of up to 1 percent on the sale of top-prize winning tickets for Lotto, Easy 5, or Powerball (1% of Louisiana's contribution to the jackpot's cash value; for Powerball, a minimum bonus of $25,000). Retailer commission and incentives totaled $19.7 million in fiscal year 2009.

The Lottery retains less than 10 percent of its revenue to fund operations, including its headquarters, five regional sales offices where players claim winning tickets, technology for generating tickets and conducting drawings, ticket printing, advertising, promotions, and staffing.

The US and Louisiana governments consider winnings from all forms of gaming to be income for tax purposes. By law, the LLC must report winnings from each ticket with a prize value over $600 to the Internal Revenue Service, and the Louisiana Department of Revenue and Taxation.

Income tax regulations require the LLC to withhold 25 percent federal taxes, and 5 percent Louisiana taxes, from prizes of more than $5,000. A gambling income statement, W2-G, is mailed to the claimant by January in the year following the payment of the prize. The W2-G is mailed to the address entered on the claim form unless the Lottery is notified of an address change before the W2-G is issued.

=== Minimum purchasing age ===
According to Louisiana law, Lottery ticket purchasers must be at least 21 years old. Individuals who sell tickets are required to obtain proof of age through a valid current drivers' license, ID card, passport, or military/federal ID containing a photo and date of birth.

Individuals who are at least 21 can give Lottery tickets to a person under 21 as a gift, although minors must be accompanied by a legal guardian or a family member who is at least 21 to claim a Lottery prize. Underage people can sell Lottery tickets if they meet the minimum employment age of 14, and are employed by a licensed Lottery retailer.

The 21 minimum age requirement to purchase Lottery tickets was changed from 18 in 1998 to coincide with the age requirement for most other forms of gaming in Louisiana, which is one of only four jurisdictions (Arizona, Iowa and Mississippi are the others) that requires ticket purchasers to be at least 21.

=== Becoming a retailer ===
The Lottery licenses retailers to sell all of its products (draw-style and scratch-off tickets.) In selecting retailers for licensure, the LLC considers the applicants':

- financial responsibility
- integrity
- reputation
- accessibility of the business or activity
- security of the premises
- projected sales volume
- whether sufficient retailers already exist to serve public convenience

Because of the considerable investment of equipment and sales support the Lottery makes for on-line retailers, potential retailers are scrutinized to ensure an adequate return on this investment in making the decision to grant or renew a license.

The following are the minimum qualifications to be considered for a retailer license:

- Current in filings and payment of all taxes, interest, and penalties owed to any political subdivision, including the Louisiana Workforce Commission (formerly the Louisiana Department of Labor), Louisiana Department of Revenue, and the Louisiana Secretary of State.
- Having no conviction of any illegal gambling activity, false statements, false swearing, perjury, or a crime punishable by more than 1 year imprisonment or a fine of more than $1,000.
- Not a vendor or employee of the corporation or residing in the same household as an officer of the corporation.
- Having never made a false statement of material fact to the corporation.
- Compliant with the Americans with Disabilities Act.

== Drawings ==
Drawings for Louisiana-based games are conducted at Lottery headquarters in downtown Baton Rouge. They are videotaped and conducted in a special room secured by alarms and motion detectors. Each drawing is conducted using one of two secure automated drawing machines. Automated drawing machines are stand-alone computers that are essentially random number generators that are completely separate from the system that generates tickets, so the number of winners and where the winning tickets were sold is not known until after the drawing has occurred.

Louisiana-based drawings are held every evening, except on Christmas Day and Easter Sunday, beginning at approximately 9:30 pm, after confirming that client sales have ceased and are verified. Tickets for Lotto, Easy 5, Pick 3, Pick 4, and Pick 5 must be purchased by 9:30 p.m. on draw nights. Powerball tickets must be purchased by 9:00 p.m. on draw nights. The public is welcome to attend any drawing, but must reserve a seat by contacting the Lottery during regular business hours. Drawings for Pick 3, Pick 4 and Pick 5 are held daily, while drawings for Easy 5, Lotto, and Powerball are held only on Wednesdays and Saturdays. Powerball, the Lottery's multi-jurisdictional game, is conducted live at 9:59 p.m., Central Standard Time on Mondays, Wednesdays and Saturdays by the Multi-State Lottery Association (MUSL) at Florida Lottery's headquarters in Tallahassee, Florida.

One of three methods in choosing random numbers is used for each of the Lottery's games. These are burned on to the "read only" memory of a microchip. The microchips are secured in the systems' central processing unit, and a protective seal makes tampering impossible. Access to the room and machines is reliant upon a dual key and password system from a Lottery drawing official and a legislative auditor. Prior to each drawing, the drawing method and machine are randomly selected.

After both drawings are conducted, the official winning numbers generated by the system are transmitted to Louisiana Public Broadcasting, WLPB, for satellite relay to all participating television stations and are faxed to news media. The Lottery also posts the winning numbers on its Web site following the drawings each night. The LLC discontinued live drawings for its in-house games in 1998, ahead of a current industry trend toward automated drawings.

=== How to Claim a Prize ===
1. Prizes of $600 or less can be claimed at participating Lottery retailers.
2. Non-jackpot prizes under $510,000 can be claimed at any Lottery office.
3. All prizes can be claimed at Lottery headquarters in Baton Rouge. Powerball prizes over $510,000 and Lotto jackpots must be claimed at Headquarters.
4. Prizes can also be claimed by signing the winning ticket and mailing it, along with a claim form, to:

Louisiana Lottery Corporation
Attn: Prize Validations
P.O. Box 90010
Baton Rouge, LA 70879

Draw game prizes must be claimed within 180 days of the drawing in which the prize was won. Scratch-off prizes claims must be made within 90 days after the announced closure of the game. Powerball jackpot winners have 60 days after claiming their prize to select cash or annuity.

The LLC is required to report all prizes greater than $600 to the IRS and the Louisiana Department of Revenue. For winners with a U.S.-issued Social Security number, prizes of $5,000 or more are subject to Louisiana income tax withholding, and also have federal tax withheld. Unpaid child support owed by the winner may also be withheld. Annuitized prizes are the property of the winner's estate in the event of death.
Lottery tickets are bearer instruments, which means that the Lottery must pay the holder of a winning ticket presented for payment. Signing the back of the ticket is the single most important thing one can do to help protect themselves from theft and demonstrate ownership of the ticket. Any alteration to a winning ticket worth more than $600 is cause for an immediate security investigation. Once a winning ticket has been paid, however, it is much more difficult to determine whether another individual was the rightful owner. By law, the Lottery can pay a winning ticket only once.

== Lottery games ==
=== Current in-house games ===
==== Pick 3 ====
In 1992 the LLC launched its second draw-style game, Pick 3. It lets players choose their own play style and wager to win up to $500 on a $1 bet, or $250 on a 50¢ bet. Players pick any three-digit number on a playslip or choose Quick Pick. Pick 3 has four ways to play. By playing a "straight", players must match their three digits in exact order to win. By playing a "box", players can match their three digits in any order. By playing a "straight/box" players combine a 50-cent "straight" play and 50-cent "box" play. Or, by playing a "combo", players can match three digits in any order to win a "straight" payout. Bettors can play their numbers up to seven consecutive days. Drawings are held daily except Christmas and Easter, when no Louisiana-based drawings are held.

==== Pick 4 ====
The LLC launched Pick 4 on March 1, 1999, with daily drawings. Players pick any four digits, from 0 through 9, or use Quick Pick to randomly generate the numbers on up to five different plays on one ticket, after also deciding how to play each number. Players can win up to $5,000 for a $1 play or up to $2,500 for a 50-cent play. Bettors can play their numbers up to seven consecutive days.

==== Pick 5 ====
The LLC launched Pick 5 on August 1, 2021, with daily drawings. Players pick any five digits, from 0 through 9, or use Quick Pick to randomly generate the numbers on up to five different plays on one ticket, after also deciding how to play each number. Players can win up to $50,000 for a $1 play or up to $25,000 for a 50¢ play. They also win by matching the 5 digits in any order, or matching the first/last 4, 3 or 2 digits, in exact order and position. Bettors can play their numbers up to seven consecutive days.

==== Easy 5 ====
Easy 5 was relaunched in 2007, replacing Cash Quest, which replaced the original version of Easy 5 in 1998. It offers players the chance to win a pari-mutuel jackpot of at least $50,000 for matching 5 numbers from 1 through 37. Any game with at least 2 matches wins; overall odds of winning a prize are 1 in 8.

If a player chooses to use ezmatch, the Lottery's terminal will print five ezmatch numbers on the ticket, along with a corresponding instant prize for each number. Players matching any of the five ezmatch numbers to any of the regular Easy 5 numbers on their ticket win the ezmatch prize for that number.

==== Louisiana Lotto ====
Louisiana Lotto began in January 1992; it draws 6 numbers from 1 to 42(originally was drawn from 40). In 1995, the LLC began paying Louisiana Lotto jackpots as cash instead of a 20-year annuity. It offers a pari-mutuel jackpot of at least $500,000 that keeps growing until it is won(originally was $250,000). In 1998, a $3 prize level for matching 3 of the 6 numbers was added, decreasing the odds to 1 in 34.4. The game is structured to average $1,000 and $50 for the match 5 and match 4 prize levels respectively. Started from August 5, 2020, the LLC added two more numbers, which changed the game's matrix from 6/40 to 6/42, increased the starting jackpot prize from $250,000 to $500,000, and the match 5's prize decreased to an average $1,000 from $2,000.

==== Powerball (multi-lottery game) ====
In 1995, the LLC joined the flagship game operated by MUSL. Powerball jackpots begin at $20 million, increasing if there is no top-prize winner. The game features a double matrix: 5 of 59, and 1 of 39. The advertised Powerball jackpot represents an estimate of the annuity, which, if chosen, is paid in 30 annual installments that increase by 4 percent yearly. The first installment is paid when the prize is claimed. Winners can instead choose the cash option, which is the cash in the jackpot pool. The cash value represents the amount of money MUSL would have invested to purchase the annuity. In 2001, the PowerPlay option was introduced. For an additional $1 per play, bettors can multiply a non-jackpot prize by up to 5. Before the Powerball drawing, a PowerPlay multiplier is randomly selected. The match-5 second prize (five white balls) automatically is a 5x win on a PowerPlay wager. Overall odds are 1 in 35.

In January 2012, Powerball will become a $2-per-play game; with PowerPlay, $3.

==== Mega Millions (multi-lottery game) ====
Perhaps surprisingly, Louisiana did not participate in the cross-selling expansion of Mega Millions and Powerball on January 31, 2010. As of April 21, 2024, there are 46 US lotteries; all offer Mega Millions and Powerball.

With Powerball becoming a $2-per-play game in January 2012, Louisiana decided to pursue adding Mega Millions, which has always been $1 per play; $2 with the Megaplier option (there are no plans to raise the price of a Mega Millions ticket.) Mega Millions became available in Louisiana on November 16, 2011.

=== Former Louisiana Lottery games ===
- On March 16, 1997, the LLC began offering the MUSL game Daily Millions, which began in 1996. It was drawn daily, including Sundays, and cost $1 per play. However, MUSL discontinued the game on April 19, 1998, because of unexpectedly rare occurrences of top prize wins.
- The LLC launched the in-house game Cash Quest on October 12, 1998, replacing its original version of Easy 5. Low sales finally resulted in the game's end on September 15, 2007. At that time, the Lottery launched a new version of Easy 5.
- On September 9, 2000, the LLC was part of the launch of MUSL's Rolldown. When no ticket won the top prize, it filtered down to lower prize levels. The game ended in April 2002. Since then, except for Powerball, the LLC has not offered a MUSL game.

=== Scratch-offs ===
As the name indicates, players scratch off a protective coating on a ticket to find out if they're an instant winner. A selection of 30 to 40 scratch-offs featuring Louisiana, holiday, casino, and other themes are introduced yearly. From 1 million to 3 million tickets of each game are printed, with new games launched monthly. Scratch-off prizes have varied from a free ticket to $1 million. The Lottery offers $1, $2, $3, $5 and $10 scratch-off games. In general, higher priced tickets have higher prize values, lower overall odds of winning, more chances to win on a ticket, and higher payout percentages. When the last top prize in a game is claimed, sales cease, and the game is closed.
