= Louisiana Lottery =

Louisiana Lottery can refer to:

- Louisiana State Lottery Company, a private lottery operated in the mid-19th century
- Louisiana Lottery Corporation, the current lottery operated by the government of Louisiana
