= NASCAR O'Reilly Auto Parts Series at Kansas Speedway =

NASCAR O'Reilly Auto Parts Series races at Kansas Speedway

Kansas Lottery 300

NASCAR O'Reilly Auto Parts Series
- Venue: Kansas Speedway
- Location: Kansas City, Kansas, United States
- Corporate sponsor: Kansas Lottery
- First race: 2001
- Distance: 300 miles (482.80 km)
- Laps: 200; Stages 1/2: 45; Final stage: 110
- Previous names: Mr. Goodcents 300 (2001–2004); United Way 300 presented by Yellow Transportation & Sprint (2005); Yellow Transportation 300 (2006–2007); Kansas Lottery 250 (2020 I)
- Most wins (driver): Kyle Busch (4)
- Most wins (team): Joe Gibbs Racing (14)
- Most wins (manufacturer): Toyota (14)

Circuit information
- Surface: Asphalt
- Length: 1.5 mi (2.4 km)
- Turns: 4

The Kansas Lottery 300 is a NASCAR O'Reilly Auto Parts Series stock car race that takes place at Kansas Speedway in Kansas City, Kansas.

== History ==
The race has been on the schedule since 2001. The race was typically held in the fall, in conjunction with The Chase.

In 2020, Kansas held two races for the first time, replacing the race at Iowa Speedway as a part of the COVID-19 pandemic.

In 2026, the race was moved to the spring, joining as the support race to the AdventHealth 400. It was the first time the series would race at Kansas in the spring. It would also become the second Dash 4 Cash race.

== Past winners ==
Year	Date	No.	Driver	Team	Manufacturer	Race Distance		Race Time	Average Speed (mph)	Report	Ref
Year	Date	No.	Driver	Team	Manufacturer	Laps	Miles (km)	Race Time	Average Speed (mph)	Report	Ref
2001	September 29	10	Jeff Green	ppc Racing	Ford	200	300 (482.803)	2:19:24	129.125	Report	
2002	September 28	9	Jeff Burton	Roush Racing	Ford	200	300 (482.803)	2:29:22	120.509	Report	
2003	October 4	37	David Green	Brewco Motorsports	Pontiac*	200	300 (482.803)	2:39:05	113.148	Report	
2004	October 9	87	Joe Nemechek	NEMCO Motorsports	Chevrolet	204*	306 (492.459)	2:36:15	117.504	Report	
2005	October 8	6	Kasey Kahne	Evernham Motorsports	Dodge	200	300 (482.803)	2:33:25	117.328	Report	
2006	September 30	21	Kevin Harvick	Richard Childress Racing	Chevrolet	200	300 (482.803)	2:41:21	111.559	Report	
2007	September 29	5	Kyle Busch	Hendrick Motorsports	Chevrolet	200	300 (482.803)	2:46:55	107.838	Report	
2008	September 27	18	Denny Hamlin	Joe Gibbs Racing	Toyota	200	300 (482.803)	2:27:11	122.296	Report	
2009	October 3	20	Joey Logano	Joe Gibbs Racing	Toyota	200	300 (482.803)	2:27:40	121.896	Report	
2010	October 2	20	Joey Logano	Joe Gibbs Racing	Toyota	200	300 (482.803)	2:30:03	119.960	Report	
2011	October 8	22	Brad Keselowski	Penske Racing	Dodge	200	300 (482.803)	2:23:08	125.757	Report	
2012	October 20	6	Ricky Stenhouse Jr.	Roush Fenway Racing	Ford	206*	309 (497.287)	2:46:08	111.597	Report	
2013	October 5	18	Matt Kenseth	Joe Gibbs Racing	Toyota	200	300 (482.803)	2:37:32	114.262	Report	
2014	October 4	54	Kyle Busch	Joe Gibbs Racing	Toyota	200	300 (482.803)	2:29:17	120.576	Report	
2015	October 17	54	Kyle Busch	Joe Gibbs Racing	Toyota	204*	306 (492.459)	2:31:10	121.455	Report	
2016	October 15	18	Kyle Busch	Joe Gibbs Racing	Toyota	200	300 (482.803)	2:44:45	109.256	Report	
2017	October 21	18	Christopher Bell	Joe Gibbs Racing	Toyota	200	300 (482.803)	2:07:31	141.158	Report	
2018	October 20	42	John Hunter Nemechek	Chip Ganassi Racing	Chevrolet	200	300 (482.803)	2:31:16	118.995	Report	
2019	October 19	19	Brandon Jones	Joe Gibbs Racing	Toyota	200	300 (482.803)	2:31:10	119.074	Report	
2020	July 25*	19	Brandon Jones	Joe Gibbs Racing	Toyota	175	262.5 (422.452)	2:04:37	126.388	Report	
2020	October 17	98	Chase Briscoe	Stewart–Haas Racing	Ford	200	300 (482.803)	2:39:40	112.735	Report	
2021	October 23	54	Ty Gibbs	Joe Gibbs Racing	Toyota	200	300 (482.803)	2:39:48	112.641	Report	
2022	September 10	9	Noah Gragson	JR Motorsports	Chevrolet	93*	139.5 (224.503)	1:13:37	113.697	Report	
2023	September 9	20	John Hunter Nemechek	Joe Gibbs Racing	Toyota	200	300 (482.803)	2:44:45	109.256	Report	
2024	September 28	20	Aric Almirola	Joe Gibbs Racing	Toyota	200	300 (482.803)	2:28:43	121.036	Report	
2025	September 27	20	Brandon Jones	Joe Gibbs Racing	Toyota	200	300 (482.803)	2:20:38	127.992	Report	
2026	April 18	54	Taylor Gray	Joe Gibbs Racing	Toyota	200	300 (482.803)	2:33:55	116.946	Report	
2027	October 2									Report	

- 2004, 2012, 2015: Races extended due to NASCAR overtime.
- 2022: Race was shortened due to rain, stopped after the second stage (official status).
- 2020 I: Race replaced the race at Iowa Speedway due to the COVID-19 pandemic.

=== Multiple winners (drivers) ===
# Wins	Driver	Years won
4	Kyle Busch	2007, 2014-2016
2	Joey Logano	2009, 2010
2	John Hunter Nemechek	2018, 2023
2	Brandon Jones	2019, 2025

=== Multiple winners (teams) ===
# Wins	Team	Years won
14	Joe Gibbs Racing	2008-2010, 2013-2017, 2019, 2021, 2023-2026
2	Roush Fenway Racing	2002, 2012

=== Manufacturer wins ===
# Wins	Make	Years won
14	(Japan) Toyota	2008-2010, 2013-2017, 2019, 2021, 2023-2026
5	(United States) Chevrolet	2004, 2006, 2007, 2018, 2022
4	(United States) Ford	2001, 2002, 2020, 2012
2	(United States) Dodge	2005, 2011
1	(United States) Pontiac	2003

Previous race: Mission 200 at The Glen	NASCAR O'Reilly Auto Parts Series; Kansas Lottery 300	Next race: Focused Health 302
