= North Dakota Lottery =

Lottery competition

The North Dakota Lottery is run by the government of North Dakota. The Lottery began in 2004, following voter approval of an initiative constitutional amendment in 2002, Measure 2, which amended Article XI, Section 25 of the North Dakota Constitution to allow for the state to join a multi-state lottery "for the benefit of the State of North Dakota." In-state games were not allowed; 63 percent of voters supported the measure.

As the Lottery is allowed only to offer multi-jurisdictional games, North Dakota-only games cannot be offered. All North Dakota Lottery games are part of the Multi-State Lottery Association (MUSL). North Dakota's games are: Lucky for Life, Mega Millions, Powerball, Lotto America, and 2by2.

North Dakota's lottery games require players to be at least 18 years old.

== Current draw games ==
=== Multi-jurisdictional games ===
==== 2by2 ====
2by2 is offered in North Dakota, Kansas, Nebraska, and Wyoming. It is drawn nightly. 2by2 draws two red numbers from 1 through 26, and two white numbers, also 1 through 26. Games cost $1 each. There are eight ways to win. The top prize usually is $22,000; however, a ticket good for seven drawings matching all four numbers in a Tuesday draw wins $44,000.

==== Lucky for Life ====
In 2009, the Connecticut Lottery began a game then known as Lucky-4-Life. Eventually, it became a regional game. After several modifications, in 2015 it became a "quasi-national" game. (As of 2018, it is available in 24 states and the District of Columbia.) Lucky for Life plays are $2 each. Two number fields are used: players choose 5 of 48 "white balls", and a green "Lucky Ball" from 18 numbers. Drawings remain in Connecticut; each Monday and Thursday night, the winning numbers are selected from two "classic" drawing machines. Top prize is $1,000-per-week-for-life; second prize, $25,000-per year. Winners of a "lifetime prize" can choose cash instead.

Lucky for Life replaced Wild Card in North Dakota in 2016. South Dakota, Montana, and Idaho also offered Wild Card; the latter three states also have joined LFL.

==== Lotto America ====
Lotto America is offered in 13 states; it is drawn Wednesdays and Saturdays. Lotto America draws five "red ball" numbers from 1 through 52, and a "blue ball" numbered 1-10. The "All-Star Bonus" option multiplies non-jackpot prizes. Plays are $1 each, or $2 with the multiplier.

Lotto America replaced Hot Lotto after the latter's final drawing on October 28, 2017. (See also Hot Lotto fraud scandal.)

==== Powerball ====
Powerball was North Dakota's first lottery game. Its opening jackpot is $40 million; it is drawn Wednesday and Saturday nights.

==== Mega Millions ====
On October 13, 2009, the Mega Millions consortium and MUSL reached an agreement in principle to cross-sell Mega Millions and Powerball in U.S. lottery jurisdictions. The Lottery Advisory Commission voted unanimously on October 22, 2009 to bring Mega Millions to North Dakota, with Attorney General Wayne Stenehjem eventually approving the game. The Lottery joined Mega Millions on January 31, 2010. The current format for Mega Millions began on April 5, 2025.
