= 7th Street Casino =

Wyandotte Nation casino located in Kansas City, Kansas

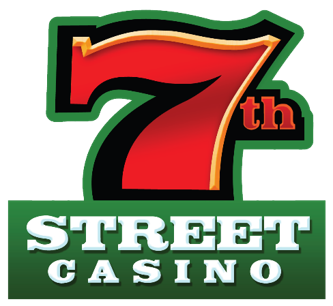

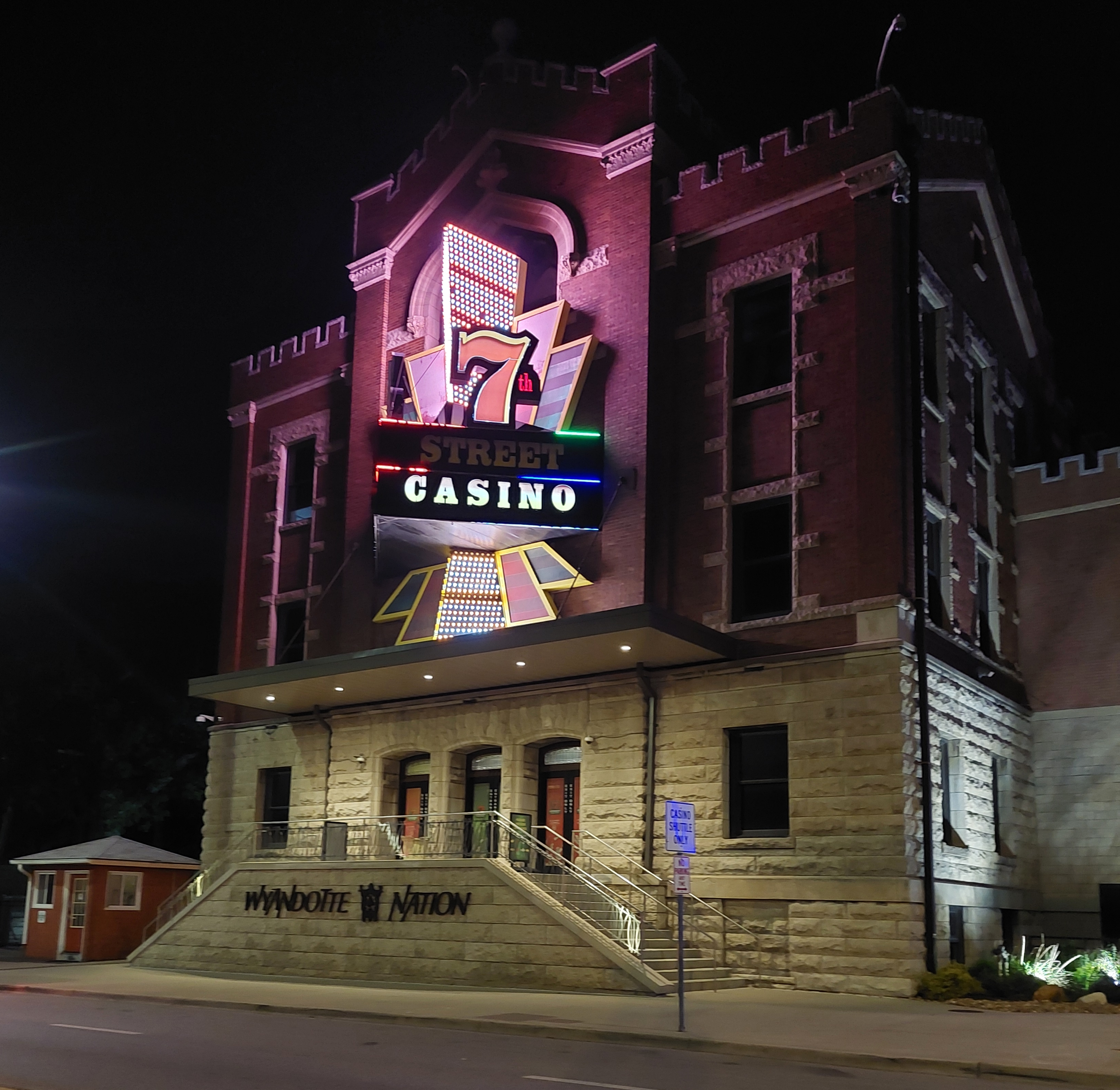
- 7th Street Casino in May 2024

- Location in Kansas 7th Street Casino (the United States)
- Interactive map of 7th Street Casino
- Location: Kansas City, Kansas; 777 North 7th Street Trafficway; 39.11395°N 94.62643°W
- Gaming space: 20,000 square feet (1,900 m^{2})
- Casino type: Native American
- Owner: Wyandotte Nation
- Website: 7th Street Casino

7th Street Casino is a Native American casino located in the old Scottish Rite Temple in Kansas City, Kansas. The facility is owned and operated by the Wyandotte Nation.

== History ==
In the early 2000s, the Wyandotte Nation was planning on building an 80,000 square feet (7,400 m^{2}) Class III casino in Village West near the Kansas Speedway and other nearby tourist attractions. While the Unified Government of Wyandotte County and Kansas City, Kansas was supportive of the idea, Kansas Governor Bill Graves was opposed to the idea of allowing an out-of-state tribe to open a casino in the state. The tribe then filed a lawsuit against the City of Kansas City, Kansas, and 1,400 property owners (including several nearby manufacturing plants) in October 2002, claiming that the tribe was owed 2,000 acres of land related to an 1855 treaty when the tribe was moved to Oklahoma. The tribe offered to settle the lawsuit in exchange for the casino being permitted at Village West. The lawsuit angered city officials, who publicly accused the tribe of "stabbing (them) in the back" and stated they no longer would be supportive of the tribe's plans for the Village West casino.

In 1996, the tribe purchased a tract of land containing the Huron Cemetery, a historical burial ground for the tribe, and the old Kansas City Kansas Scottish Rite Temple for $100,000. While their planned casino at Village West was still being denied, the tribe stated they were going to open a casino on the land near the cemetery and the Scottish Rite Temple, which happened to be across the street from the Kansas City, Kansas City Hall. The tribe claimed that under the Indian Gaming Regulatory Act of 1988, they could build a class II casino on tribal land without local government approval. In 2002, the Bureau of Indian Affairs agreed with the tribe's federal trust status of the Shriner Temple tract and was thus eligible for class II gaming. On August 28, 2003, the 7th Street Casino was first opened in mobile units between the cemetery and the temple, offering approximately 150 bingo and "pull tab" games. In response, then Kansas Attorney General Phill Kline filed a federal lawsuit against the two federal agencies claiming they were failing to enforce the National Environmental Policy Act and the National Historic Preservation Act because the tribe had made changes to the Scottish Rite Temple, which was on the National Register of Historic Places.

In April 2004, the State of Kansas raided and shut down the casino and seized the casino's gambling equipment and $500,000 in cash. In September 2004, the National Indian Gaming Commission reversed their decision and said the casino could not reopen. In October 2004, the tribe sued the agency at the US District Court for the District of Columbia. The case was eventually transferred to the US District Court for the District of Kansas. In December 2004, US District Court Judge Julie A. Robinson ruled the raid was illegal, but the casino could not reopen until the legal issues were resolved. The US Tenth Circuit Court of Appeals later agreed the raid was illegal and violated the tribe's sovereignty. The tribe spent an approximate $20 million to renovate and convert the Scottish Rite Temple into a casino, which it opened on January 10, 2008, as a class II casino. US District Judge Richard Dean Rogers dismissed the state's final legal challenge against the casino in September 2008, enabling the casino to pursue full class III status. In December 2010, the Wyandotte Nation and the state reached an agreement to allow the casino to become a class III casino and offer slot machines.

On March 31, 2026, Wyandotte Nation Chief Billy Friend and Kansas Governor Laura Kelly signed a new Tribal-State Gaming Compact. The agreement superseded a 1995 compact and updated the Class III status along with authorizing the facility to pursue sports betting alongside its existing gaming operations.

== Facility ==
The 7th Street Casino has 20,000 square feet (1,900 m^{2}) of gaming space on three floors. The casino is an "all-slot" casino, offering 600 slot machines, but does not offer any table games. In addition to gaming, the casino also has a cafe and bar.

== See also ==
- List of casinos in Kansas
- History of gambling in the United States
- National Indian Gaming Commission
