= Kansas Crossing Casino =

Casino and resort in Pittsburg, Kansas

Kansas Crossing Casino + Hotel

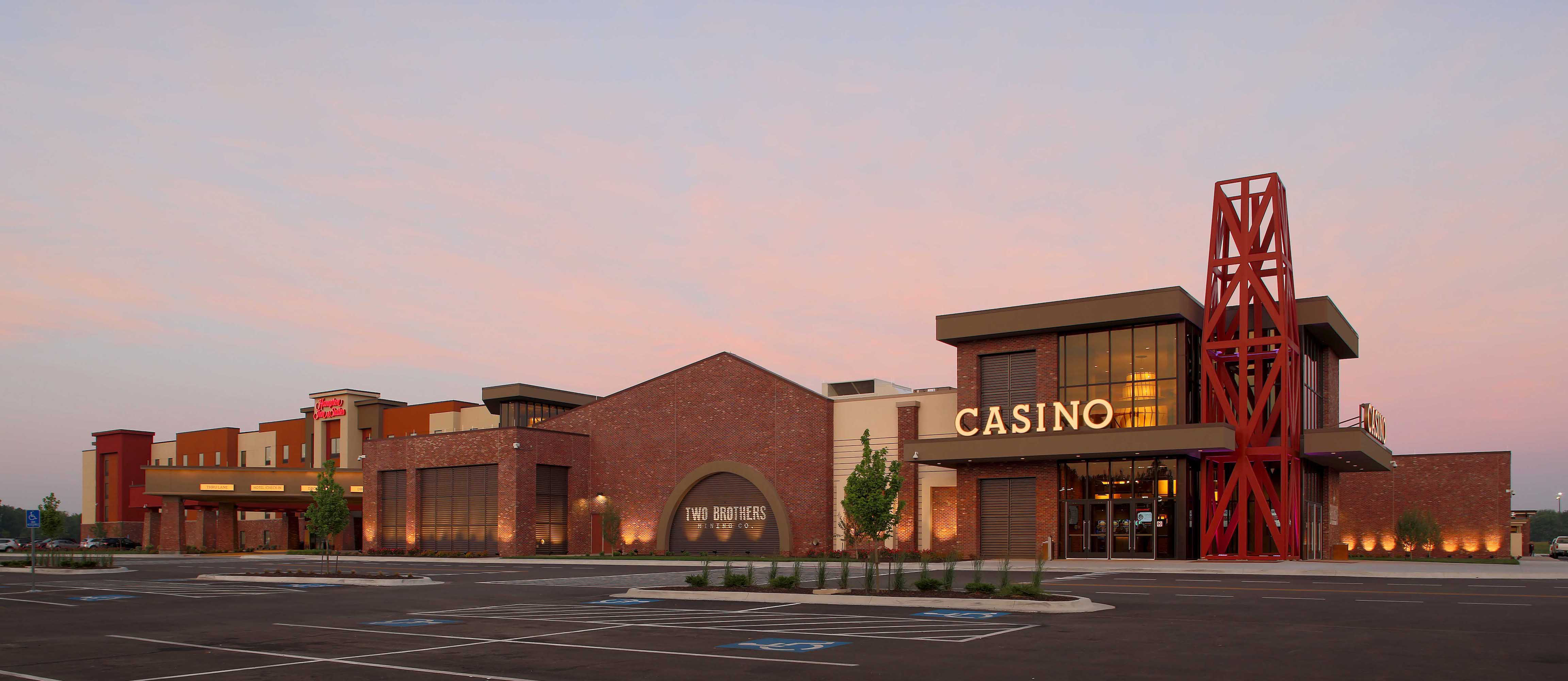
- Interactive map of Kansas Crossing Casino + Hotel
- Location: Pittsburg, Kansas; 1275 South Highway 69, Pittsburg, KS 66762; 37.34386°N 94.70929°W
- Opened: April 8, 2017
- Theme: Southeast Kansas' historical mining theme
- No. of rooms: 123
- Notable restaurants: Two Brothers Mining Company, Bronco Bar
- Casino type: Private
- Website: kansascrossingcasino.com

The Kansas Crossing Casino + Hotel is a casino and hotel in Pittsburg, Kansas. Owned by Equity Ventures, JNB Gaming, and Laham Development, the property is operated by JNB Gaming and was built for US$80 million. Opened in 2017, it is located at the intersection of U.S. Highway 69 and U.S. Highway 400.

== History ==
In 2007, the state of Kansas enacted the Kansas Expanded Lottery Act, which included authorization for four casinos to be built and managed by private developers, under contract with the Kansas Lottery. On June 23, 2015, the Kansas Racing and Gaming Commission voted to award the Kansas Crossing Casino + Hotel a license to build just south of Pittsburg, Kansas. The Kansas Crossing Casino beat out two other proposals including the Castle Rock Casino plan from Wichita businessmen Rodney and Brandon Steven as well as Camptown Casino proposed by billionaire Phil Ruffin of Las Vegas. This was the fourth such license awarded in the state of Kansas.

Kansas Crossing Casino opened to the public on March 31, 2017, then celebrated its grand opening on April 8, 2017 with a performance from musician Jerrod Niemann. The Kansas Crossing Casino + Hotel opened with over 625 slot machines, 16 table games, a 123-room Hampton Inn & Suites, Two Brothers Mining Company restaurant, and an indoor/outdoor entertainment venue called The Corral.

== Philanthropy ==
In 2018, it was reported that The Kansas Crossing Casino + Hotel had committed $4.5 million over 10 years to support the Southeast Kansas Career and Technical Education Center (CTEC), Pittsburg State University, and the Crawford County Convention & Visitors Bureau.

== See also ==
- List of casinos in Kansas
