= Wild Card (lottery) =

Lottery game in the United States

Wild Card (for part of its history Wild Card 2) was a lottery game that was available in Idaho, Montana, Nebraska, North Dakota, and South Dakota, although at no point did the five lotteries offer it simultaneously. The game was administered by the Multi-State Lottery Association (MUSL), which is best known for Mega Millions and Powerball. It was drawn Wednesdays and Saturdays.

The original version of the game began in 1998; it was known as Wild Card, and lasted 15 months; it was played in Idaho, Montana, Nebraska, and South Dakota. The game's format was changed, with a "2" added to the name, in May 1999; Nebraska dropped out upon the format change. North Dakota joined in 2004.

In late 2015, the "2" was dropped from the name, although the game itself was not altered. The final draw was on February 24, 2016.

== Format ==
Under the game's most recent format, whose first drawing was on January 16, 2013, players got two games for each $1 wagered; games had to be played in pairs. Each game was played in the same manner as Mega Millions or Powerball; five numbers from 1 through 33 were selected. The sixth "number" was actually 1 of 16 representations of playing cards: a Jack, Queen, King, or the Ace of any of the four suits: clubs, hearts, diamonds, or spades. (The previous version drew from 31 numbers, but from the same number of "Wild Cards.")

All prizes, including the jackpot, were paid in cash. The minimum jackpot was $200,000; it was $100,000 in the previous version.

In addition to the jackpot, the other prizes in the 2013-2016 version were:

- All 5 numbers without Wild Card (5+0): $6,000
- 4 numbers plus Wild Card (4+1): $500
- 4+0: won $30
- 3+1: won $6
- 3+0: won $2
- 2+1: won $2
- 1+1: won $1
- 0+1: won $1

Among the reasons for the 2013 changes to Wild Card was to attract more American lotteries to the game, although none joined since North Dakota in 2004.

The final drawing for Wild Card was on February 24, 2016.
