= List of casinos in Kansas =

This is a list of casinos in Kansas.

== List of casinos ==
List of casinos in the U.S. state of Kansas
Casino	City	County	State	District	Type	Comments
7th Street Casino	Kansas City	Wyandotte	Kansas		Native American	Owned by the Wyandotte Nation
Boot Hill Casino	Dodge City	Ford	Kansas		Land-based	Opened December 2009
Casino White Cloud	White Cloud	Doniphan	Kansas		Native American	Owned by the Iowa Tribe of Kansas and Nebraska
CrossWinds Casino	Park City	Sedgwick	Kansas		Native American	Owned by the Wyandotte Nation
Golden Eagle Casino	Horton	Brown	Kansas		Native American	Owned by the Kickapoo Tribe in Kansas
Hollywood Casino at Kansas Speedway	Kansas City	Wyandotte	Kansas		Land-based	Opened February 2012
Kansas Crossing Casino and Hotel	Pittsburg	Crawford	Kansas		Land-based	Opened March 2017
Kansas Star Casino	Mulvane	Sumner	Kansas		Land-based	Opened on Dec. 26, 2011
Prairie Band Casino & Resort	Mayetta	Jackson	Kansas		Native American	Owned by the Prairie Band Potawatomi Nation
Sac and Fox Casino	Powhattan	Brown	Kansas		Native American	Owned by the Sac and Fox Nation of Missouri in Kansas and Nebraska

== See also ==
- List of casinos in the United States
- List of casino hotels
