= Nebraska Lottery =

U.S. state lottery

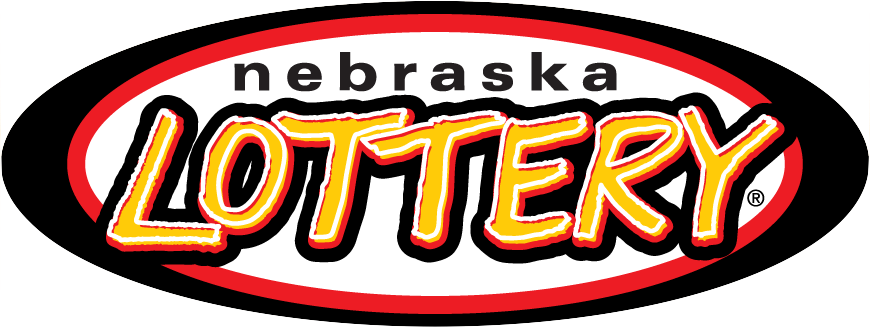

Agency overview
- Formed: February 24, 1993; 33 years ago
- Type: State lottery
- Headquarters: 137 NW 17th Street; Lincoln, Nebraska 68528
- Motto: 1.061 Billion Back to Nebraska
- Agency executive: Brian Rockey, Director of Lottery and Charitable Gaming
- Parent agency: Nebraska Department of Revenue
- Website: nelottery.com

The Nebraska Lottery is run by the government of Nebraska. It was established by the state legislature in 1993. It is a member of the Multi-State Lottery Association (MUSL). Its games include Mega Millions, Powerball, 2by2, Nebraska Pick 5, Pick 3, and MyDaY. The minimum age to purchase Nebraska Lottery tickets is 19. Elsewhere in the United States, the minimum age to buy lottery tickets is either 18 or 21.

Except for Powerball, whose winning numbers are drawn with numbered balls in Tallahassee, Florida, and Mega Millions in Atlanta, Georgia, Nebraska Lottery games are drawn by a random number generator (RNG). (Mega Millions uses an RNG to determine its Megaplier.) The keno games available in Nebraska are municipal lotteries; these predate the Nebraska Lottery.

== Draw games ==
=== Multi-jurisdictional games ===
==== 2by2 ====
2by2, also played in Kansas and North Dakota, is drawn nightly. Two red numbers and two white numbers (each 1 through 26) are drawn. Games are $1; there are seven ways to win. Matching all four numbers wins $22,000; it is doubled if won on a Tuesday, and the ticket was bought for seven consecutive draws.

==== Mega Millions ====
In 1996, six lotteries began The Big Game; it became Mega Millions in 2002. In January 2010, Mega Millions and Powerball became available to lotteries which had either game. Mega Millions became available in Nebraska on March 20, 2010.

Mega Millions is drawn Tuesdays and Fridays; its jackpots begin at $40 million and continues to grow by at least $5 million each drawing until it is won.

==== Powerball ====
Nebraska joined Powerball in 1994. Powerball jackpots begin at $40 million and continues to grow by at least $10 million each drawing until it is won; it is drawn on Mondays Wednesdays and Saturdays.

The then-largest lottery prize in American history for a single set of numbers was on a Nebraska ticket for Powerball in a 2006 drawing. The entire $365 million was shared by eight people, who chose the cash option.

==== Lucky for Life ====
The Connecticut Lottery, in 2009, began an in-house game called Lucky-4-Life. After several format changes, the game became quasi-national in 2015. As of 2019, Lucky for Life is available in 25 states and the District of Columbia.

The Nebraska Lottery began offering Lucky for Life on August 20, 2017.

=== Lotto America ===
On May 19, 2024, the Nebraska Lottery joined the multi state Lotto America game. The game draws 5 main numbers from 1 to 52 and 1 star ball number from 1 to 10. The game offers a jackpot that starts at $2,000,000 and grows from there in today’s version. The game costs $1 per game just like its predecessor from the late 1980s. There are 9 ways to win. Drawings are held on Mondays Wednesdays and Saturdays.

=== In-house games ===
==== Pick 3 ====
Pick 3 began in 2004 and is drawn daily. Play styles and prizes vary. The maximum prize available is $600.

==== MyDaY ====
MyDaY also has daily draws. Players pick a number representing a month, a number 1 through 28, 29, 30, or 31 for a day in that month, and the last two digits of a year. Games are $1 each; top prize is $5,000.

==== Nebraska Pick 5 ====
Nebraska Pick 5 draws daily. Players choose five numbers 1 through 40, making odds of winning the jackpot 1:658,008. Each play is $1. Its jackpot begins at $50,000 and grows by $10,000 each day the jackpot is not won. Smaller prizes of $500, $9, and a free Pick 5 ticket are also winnable, for tickets matching four, three, or two numbers respectively.

== Former games ==
Nebraska was part of the MUSL game Wild Card when it began in 1998. The game's format changed in May 1999, becoming Wild Card 2; simultaneously, Nebraska pulled out. Wild Card 2 remained available in Idaho, Montana, North Dakota, and South Dakota until 2016.
