= Mayetta, Kansas =

City in Jackson County, Kansas

- City
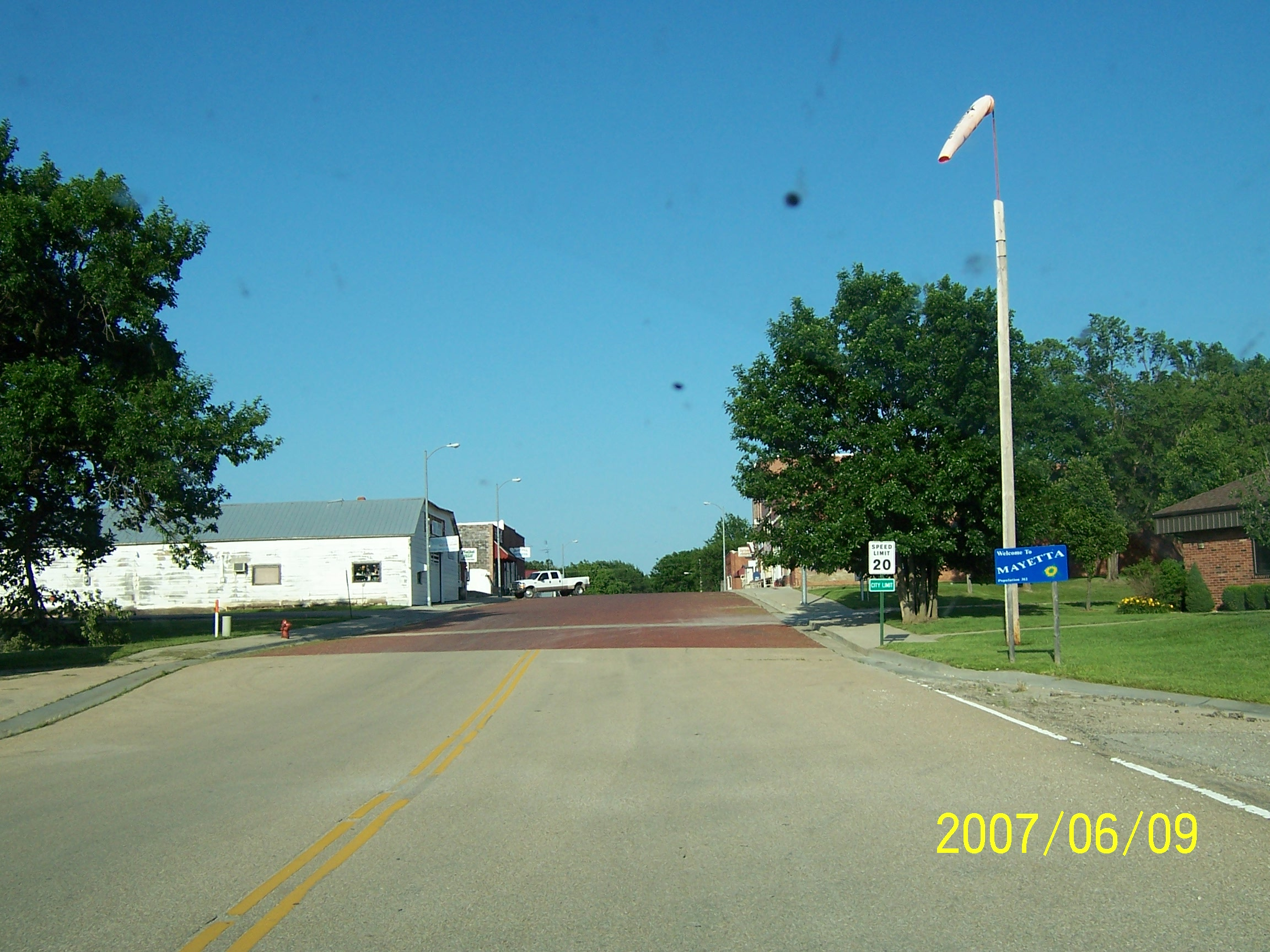
- Downtown Mayetta (2007)

- Location within Jackson County and Kansas

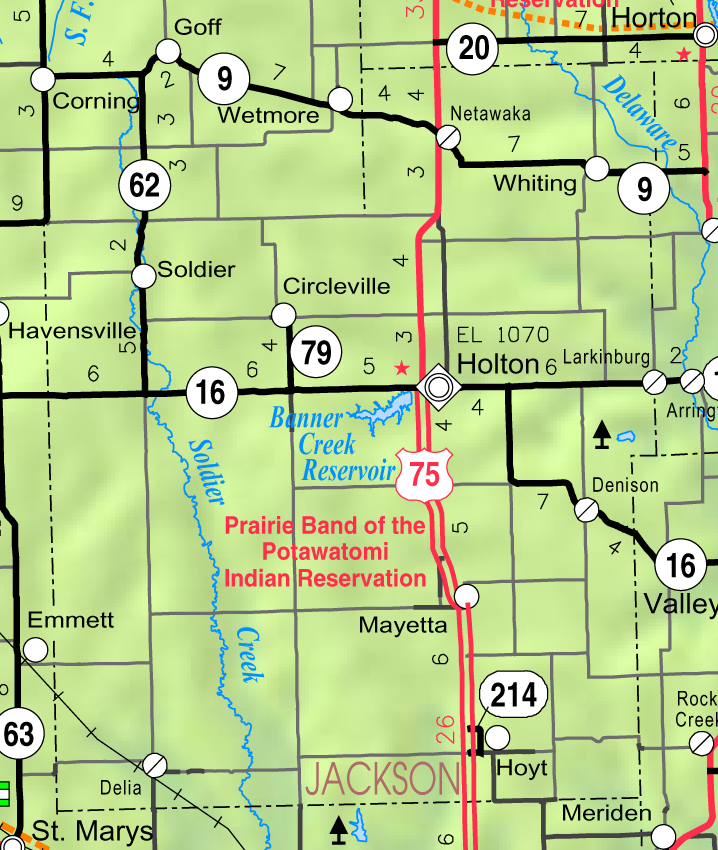
- KDOT map of Jackson County (legend)
- Coordinates: 39°20′19″N 95°43′17″W
- Country: United States
- State: Kansas
- County: Jackson
- Platted: 1886
- Named for: Mary Lunger

Area
  - Total: 0.17 sq mi (0.44 km^{2})
  - Land: 0.17 sq mi (0.44 km^{2})
  - Water: 0 sq mi (0.00 km^{2})
- Elevation: 1,191 ft (363 m)

Population (2020)
  - Total: 348
  - Density: 2,000/sq mi (790/km^{2})
- Time zone: UTC-6 (CST)
  - Summer (DST): UTC-5 (CDT)
- ZIP Code: 66509
- Area code: 785
- FIPS code: 20-45250
- GNIS ID: 2395050
- Website: mayetta.org

Mayetta is a city in Jackson County, Kansas, United States. As of the 2020 census, the population is 348.

== History ==
Mayetta was laid out and platted in 1886. It was named after Mary Henrietta Lunger, the town founder's young daughter who had died some time before.

The first post office in Mayetta was established in February 1886.

== Geography ==
According to the United States Census Bureau, the city has a total area of 0.17 square miles (0.44 km^{2}), all land.

== Demographics ==
Historical population
Census	Pop.	Note	%±
1910	337		—
1920	309		−8.3%
1930	294		−4.9%
1940	275		−6.5%
1950	247		−10.2%
1960	218		−11.7%
1970	246		12.8%
1980	287		16.7%
1990	267		−7.0%
2000	312		16.9%
2010	341		9.3%
2020	348		2.1%
U.S. Decennial Census

Mayetta is part of the Topeka, Kansas Metropolitan Statistical Area.

=== 2020 census ===
The 2020 United States census counted 348 people, 134 households, and 92 families in Mayetta. The population density was 2,059.2 per square mile (795.0/km^{2}). There were 142 housing units at an average density of 840.2 per square mile (324.4/km^{2}). The racial makeup was 72.7% (253) white or European American (70.4% non-Hispanic white), 0.86% (3) black or African-American, 18.1% (63) Native American or Alaska Native, 0.0% (0) Asian, 0.57% (2) Pacific Islander or Native Hawaiian, 0.0% (0) from other races, and 7.76% (27) from two or more races. Hispanic or Latino of any race was 6.32% (22) of the population.

Of the 134 households, 39.6% had children under the age of 18; 40.3% were married couples living together; 29.9% had a female householder with no spouse or partner present. 23.1% of households consisted of individuals and 14.2% had someone living alone who was 65 years of age or older. The average household size was 2.7 and the average family size was 3.3. The percent of those with a bachelor's degree or higher was estimated to be 9.2% of the population.

24.1% of the population was under the age of 18, 12.4% from 18 to 24, 26.4% from 25 to 44, 24.1% from 45 to 64, and 12.9% who were 65 years of age or older. The median age was 33.0 years. For every 100 females, there were 94.4 males. For every 100 females ages 18 and older, there were 91.3 males.

The 2016–2020 5-year American Community Survey estimates show that the median household income was $41,250 (with a margin of error of +/- $10,851) and the median family income was $44,375 (+/- $10,700). Males had a median income of $32,500 (+/- $6,486) versus $24,375 (+/- $5,962) for females. The median income for those above 16 years old was $30,192 (+/- $5,988). Approximately, 13.2% of families and 9.9% of the population were below the poverty line, including 11.9% of those under the age of 18 and 17.1% of those ages 65 or over.

=== 2010 census ===
As of the census of 2010, there were 341 people, 125 households, and 85 families living in the city. The population density was 2,005.9 inhabitants per square mile (774.5/km^{2}). There were 131 housing units at an average density of 770.6 per square mile (297.5/km^{2}). The racial makeup of the city was 82.1% White, 1.5% African American, 11.1% Native American, 0.3% from other races, and 5.0% from two or more races. Hispanic or Latino of any race were 2.1% of the population.

There were 125 households, of which 43.2% had children under the age of 18 living with them, 42.4% were married couples living together, 16.8% had a female householder with no husband present, 8.8% had a male householder with no wife present, and 32.0% were non-families. 26.4% of all households were made up of individuals, and 10.4% had someone living alone who was 65 years of age or older. The average household size was 2.73 and the average family size was 3.15.

The median age in the city was 32.5 years. 32.8% of residents were under the age of 18; 7% were between the ages of 18 and 24; 29.5% were from 25 to 44; 22.8% were from 45 to 64; and 7.6% were 65 years of age or older. The gender makeup of the city was 52.5% male and 47.5% female.

=== 2000 census ===
As of the census of 2000, there were 312 people, 111 households, and 75 families living in the city. The population density was 1,888.7 inhabitants per square mile (729.2/km^{2}). There were 121 housing units at an average density of 732.5 per square mile (282.8/km^{2}). The racial makeup of the city was 80.77% White, 14.10% Native American, 0.32% from other races, and 4.81% from two or more races. Hispanic or Latino of any race were 0.96% of the population.

There were 111 households, out of which 46.8% had children under the age of 18 living with them, 51.4% were married couples living together, 15.3% had a female householder with no husband present, and 32.4% were non-families. 24.3% of all households were made up of individuals, and 9.9% had someone living alone who was 65 years of age or older. The average household size was 2.81 and the average family size was 3.40.

In the city, the population was spread out, with 37.2% under the age of 18, 8.0% from 18 to 24, 31.4% from 25 to 44, 15.1% from 45 to 64, and 8.3% who were 65 years of age or older. The median age was 28 years. For every 100 females, there were 97.5 males. For every 100 females age 18 and over, there were 90.3 males.

The median income for a household in the city was $38,542, and the median income for a family was $43,500. Males had a median income of $25,313 versus $21,500 for females. The per capita income for the city was $14,800. About 2.4% of families and 3.9% of the population were below the poverty line, including 4.4% of those under age 18 and 4.5% of those age 65 or over.

== Economy ==
The Prairie Band Casino & Resort has operated, under various management, since 1998.

== Education ==
The community is served by Royal Valley USD 337 public school district.

== Notable people ==
- Minnie Evans, leader of the Potawatomi Nation, was born in Mayetta and Bill James, an expert baseball writer, grew up here.
