= Louisiana Workforce Commission =

Louisiana state agency

Louisiana Workforce Commission (LWC) is a state agency of Louisiana, headquartered in Baton Rouge. It was previously called the Louisiana Department of Labor. The name changed in 2008.

It gives assistance to state residents who had lost their jobs. In 2018 it had 925 people working for the agency.
