= Wyoming Lottery =

Lottery based in Wyoming

Logo of the Wyoming Lottery Corporation, using the "WyoLotto" branding and showing the "Jackpotalope" mascot.

The Wyoming Lottery Corporation, branded as WyoLotto, is a lottery based in Cheyenne, Wyoming that began its operations on July 1, 2013. The Wyoming Lottery Corporation is governed by a nine-member board of directors, with each member selected by the Wyoming Governor. Jon Clontz, former Oregon State Lottery COO was selected to be the Wyoming Lottery's first CEO.

== History ==
On March 13, 2013, Wyoming Governor Matt Mead authorized the creation of a state lottery, and entered into agreements with other U.S. lotteries for multi-state games. The law specifically prohibits scratchcards, instant win games, and video lottery terminals, joining the North Dakota Lottery as the only U.S. jurisdictions to prohibit scratchcards. Initially, the lottery bill had a validity period until 2019. The re-authorization clause has since been removed. In February 2019, The Wyoming Lottery Corporation was awarded the Public Gaming Research Institute (PGRI) SHARP Award for financial excellence.

Operations began on August 24, 2014, with 400 retailers authorized to sell lottery tickets.

The lottery law authorizes distribution of the first $6 million in annual revenue to cities and counties, and the remaining amount goes to schools. Given that 51 percent of national lottery revenue is derived from instant tickets, some people regard the decision to disallow scratchcards as severely restricting the potential revenue generated by the lottery. However, Matt Mead justified the law by claiming that this would reduce the amount of out-of-state spending by Wyoming residents. The Colorado Lottery estimated that $1.26 million in annual revenue was generated by Wyoming residents purchasing tickets in Colorado. Conversely, the Wyoming Lottery is expected to attract revenue from Utah, specifically the Salt Lake City metropolitan area, as many of Utah population centers are closer to Wyoming than either Colorado or Idaho. Wyoming's first two lottery games were Mega Millions and Powerball, both available on the first day of sales. Wyoming, unlike North Dakota, allows in-state games; Wyoming added Cowboy Draw in 2015. Cowboy Draw is a pick-five-from-45 game, with drawings twice a week on Mondays and Thursdays. Tickets are $5 with two lines per ticket, and jackpots start at $250,000. The Lottery joined Lucky for Life in 2016. Then the lottery joined 2by2 in March 2021.

Lottery bills had been rejected on numerous occasions in Wyoming since the 1980s. The legislation was modeled after the Georgia Lottery such that the board of directors answers to the governor, but is not a direct agency; and after the North Dakota Lottery in its solicitation of multi-state lotteries, organization, and the state's low population. As with most U.S. lotteries, the minimum age to purchase a ticket is 18. The Wyoming Lottery created the Problem Gambling Council, which includes designated employees of the Wyoming Department of Health and other organizations. Wyoming became the 44th state (plus the District of Columbia, Puerto Rico, and the U.S. Virgin Islands) to create a lottery.
