= Kansas Lottery =

State agency in Kansas, United States

- Formation: November 12, 1987
- Type: Lottery System
- Headquarters: Topeka, Kansas
- Executive Director: Stephen Durrell
- Website: www.kslottery.com

The Kansas Lottery is a government organization run by the government of Kansas. It is a charter member of the Multi-State Lottery Association (MUSL). The mission of the lottery is to produce the maximum revenue for Kansas while insuring the integrity of its games.

In November 1986, voters approved a constitutional amendment by 64% that authorized the creation of a government-run lottery, with the lottery then officially established when the Kansas Legislature passed the Kansas Lottery Act in 1987.

All Kansas Lottery games have a minimum age of 18. The Kansas Lottery offers $1, $2,$3 $5, $10, $20, and $30 scratch tickets, plus $1 and $2 instant "pull-tab" games. It also offers the draw games Powerball, Mega Millions, Lotto America, Super Kansas Cash, Pick 3, 2by2, and Keno. Lottery products are sold at approximately 1,900 retailers. Kansas' newest draw game is the multi-state Lucky for Life, whose earliest version was a Connecticut-only game.

The Lottery sponsors several races at the Kansas Speedway, including the Kansas Lottery 150 and the Kansas Lottery 300, and also oversees all Kansas state-owned casinos.

== History ==
=== Legalization and creation ===
In November 1986, voters approved a constitutional amendment by 64% that authorized the creation of a government-run lottery, with the lottery then officially established when the Kansas Legislature passed the Kansas Lottery Act in 1987.

Article 15 of the Kansas Constitution was amended in 1986 to allow the operation of a state-run lottery. The Kansas Lottery Act was passed by the Kansas Legislature in 1987, and is contained in K.S.A. 74-8701 through K.S.A. 74–8732. The Lottery Act establishes the state-owned and operated Kansas Lottery, and sets parameters for organization and operation of the Lottery. The Lottery is established by KSA 74–8703, the Kansas Lottery Commission is created by KSA 74–8709, and the powers and duties of the executive director are outlined in KSA 74-8704 and KSA 74–8706. Distribution of all revenue from the Kansas Lottery is also directed by the Legislature pursuant to K.S.A. 79-4801 through K.S.A. 79–4806. In addition to the Act itself, individual game and promotion rules are set forth in temporary administrative regulations passed by the Kansas Lottery Commission at their meetings (usually monthly).

In 1987, ticket sales for the Kansas Lottery began in 21 cities. The first instant game was "Up and Away", with a grand prize drawing of $100,000. The first week's sales were $7 million. The Kansas Lottery gradually introduced games. The early success of the Lottery allowed it to create elaborate marketing campaigns, including a traveling singing group, the Kansas Lottery Singers. The group took popular songs, changing lyrics for Lottery commercials. They traveled around Kansas from June to September 1988. Also in the late 1980s, the Lottery constructed a building on the Hutchinson fairgrounds. This building was used as a studio for the game show Kansas Lottery Live. Winners were drawn from a giant tub filled with non-winning lottery tickets. The game show ran on WIBW-TV, and later by the KSN TV network. The game's original hosts were Fred Broski and Teri Messner. Messner eventually left the show, replaced by Robin Smith, who co-hosted until the show ended in 1990.

The Kansas Lottery continued to introduce instant-win games, including those with higher price points. In 1995, the Kansas Legislature approved and the governor signed the renewal of the Kansas Lottery until 2002.

By 2000, the Lottery had produced $500 million for Kansas. The Lottery re-entered the game show business in 2000 by participating in the Powerball Instant Millionaire series.

=== Senate Bill 66 ===
In 2007, the Kansas Legislature passed Senate Bill 66, extending the Lottery until 2022 and creating the Kansas Expanded Lottery Act authorizing the Lottery, on behalf of Kansas, to own and operate four destination casinos. Electronic gaming machines would also be allowed at three parimutuel racetracks.

SB 66, as amended, created the Kansas Expanded Lottery Act which authorizes the following:

- Create "gaming zones" (casinos): Northeast Kansas Gaming Zone (Wyandotte County); Southeast Kansas Gaming Zone (Crawford and Cherokee counties); South Central Kansas Gaming Zone (Sedgwick and Summer counties); and the Southwest Kansas Gaming Zone (Ford County);
- Pari-mutuel licensee; i.e. a racetrack facility. A pari-mutuel licensee may include any existing structure at such racetrack facility or any structure that may be constructed on real estate with such racetrack facility.

The Kansas Lottery Commission is responsible for the ownership and operational control of all provisions of the Act. It is authorized to enter into contracts with the gaming managers at the exclusive and nonexclusive gaming zones.

On December 22, 2008, ground was broken for the Boot Hill Casino & Resort in Dodge City. Boot Hill is the first complex built under the 2007 Kansas Expanded Lottery Act authorizing one casino in four areas to generate revenue for Kansas. A private developer, Butler National Corporation, built and managed the casino, but the Kansas Lottery owns the rights to gambling and gambling equipment. The groundbreaking ceremony was held for Hollywood Casino at Kansas Speedway on April 30, 2010, Kansas' second government-run casino. The fourth casino to open was the Kansas Crossing Casino on March 31, 2017. The Kansas Crossing Casino is located in Pittsburg, KS. in Crawford County inside the Southeast Kansas Gaming Zone.

=== Coronavirus response ===
After announcing the closure mandate on March 17, 2020, on March 27, the Kansas Lottery extended the suspension of state casino operations for Hollywood Casino, Kansas Crossing, Crossing, Kansas Star Casino, and Boot Hill Casino. That week, Prairie Band Casino & Resort extended its own closures through April 30, although not required to follow the mandate.

Kansas Star Casino was one of four state-owned casinos to be mandated to close on March 17, 2020, by the Kansas Lottery, in response to the COVID-19 pandemic. The casinos re-opened May 22, 2020 after orders from Kansas Governor Laura Kelly, at reduced capacity to allow for social distancing to comply with health orders, and with a limit to only slot machines, as well as employees undergoing temperature checks and wearing face coverings. Visitors had social distancing enforced and had their temperatures checked.

== Scratch games and promotions ==
The Kansas Lottery offers hundreds of different instant scratch games as well as second-chance promotions through its loyalty program PlayOn. The promotions offer PlayOn members chances to win tickets to sporting events, concerts, and other interesting experiences. For the past 11 years, the Kansas Lottery has held the "Millionaire Holiday Raffle" (a $20 ticket where players have a 1-in-200,000 chance to win $1 million. The Lottery also participates in draw games including Powerball, Mega Millions, Super Kansas Cash, Lucky for Life, Lotto America, Pick 3, Racetrax, Keno, and 2by2.

== Casinos ==
In 2007, the state of Kansas enacted the Kansas Expanded Lottery Act, which included authorization for four casinos to be built and managed by private developers under contract with the Kansas Lottery.

The following in 2020 are state-owned casinos under the control of the Kansas Lottery: Hollywood Casino, Kansas Crossing, Kansas Star Casino, and Boot Hill Casino. Other casinos in Kansas, such as Prairie Band Casino & Resort, are not state-owned.

=== Boot Hill Casino, Dodge City ===
After creating the "gaming zones" in the SB 66 amendment to the Kansas Lottery Act, the first Kansas-owned casino opened in Dodge City in December 2009. Boot Hill Casino has approximately 580 slot machines and 13 table games - including blackjack, craps, roulette, and poker. Phase 2 of construction was scheduled to be completed in December 2011. Phase 2 includes adding a hotel, day spa, two restaurants, lounges, and it approximately doubles the gaming floor.

=== Hollywood Casino, Kansas Speedway ===
On April 30, 2010, the groundbreaking ceremony took place at the site of the second Kansas-owned casino negotiated under the Expanded Lottery Act. Kansas Entertainment (composed of equal parts International Speedway Corp. and Penn National Gaming Inc.) developed the $386 million casino, set to open in 2012.

The Hollywood Casino has several phases planned; the first phase includes a 100,000-square-foot (9,300 m^{2}) casino floor, 2,300 slot machines, 86 table games, and a lounge and eating facilities. Later phases may include areas such as a spa and a convention center, almost doubling the original bid of $386 million.

The casino opened in February 2012 and is at the second turn of the Kansas Speedway track.

=== Kansas Crossing Casino, Pittsburg ===
The fourth and final casino license was awarded to the Kansas Crossing Casino in Pittsburg, Kansas, on June 23, 2015, by the Kansas Racing and Gaming Commission. The Kansas Crossing Casino is an $80-million casino and hotel located at the intersection of Kansas Highways 69 and 400 just south of Pittsburg, KS. The Kansas Crossing Casino + Hotel opened with over 625 slot machines, 16 table games, 124 rooms Hampton Inn & Suites, Two Brothers Mining Company restaurant, and an indoor/outdoor entertainment venue called The Corral. The casino opened to the public on March 31, 2017.

== Sales and transfers ==
FISCAL YEAR	NET SALES	GAME PRIZES	TRANSFERS TO STATE	RETAILER EARNINGS
1988	$ 65,804,532	$ 30,123,006	$ 11,343,321	$ 3,618,110
1989	$ 68,188,022	$ 33,755,427	$ 24,500,950	$ 3,602,985
1990	$ 64,530,640	$ 28,941,942	$ 19,259,917	$ 3,318,244
1991	$ 70,206,003	$ 32,800,224	$ 19,453,470	$ 3,657,131
1992	$ 77,147,506	$ 37,304,320	$ 27,147,019	$ 4,071,319
1993	$ 114,499,165	$ 58,865,299	$ 32,629,372	$ 5,819,600
1994	$ 152,292,802	$ 79,390,419	$ 47,888,013	$ 7,845,162
1995	$ 177,074,245	$ 92,074,812	$ 53,246,818	$ 9,145,434
1996	$ 182,113,628	$ 96,088,069	$ 58,114,547	$ 9,949,228
1997	$ 185,356,681	$ 99,351,785	$ 56,658,134	$ 10,416,933
1998	$ 192,017,310	$ 101,688,863	$ 60,304,388	$ 10,935,736
1999	$ 198,920,985	$ 107,079,089	$ 59,333,464	$ 11,133,848
2000	$ 192,560,800	$ 104,377,074	$ 59,646,911	$ 11,086,788
2001	$ 184,727,159	$ 97,938,088	$ 56,535,258	$ 10,657,155
2002	$ 190,083,880	$ 98,963,631	$ 60,494,603	$ 10,970,972
2003	$ 202,942,874	$ 107,660,534	$ 62,500,000	$ 11,743,157
2004	$ 224,457,166	$ 120,775,874	$ 70,217,944	$ 12,926,131
2005	$ 206,720,771	$ 112,554,879	$ 65,409,441	$ 12,086,279
2006	$ 236,045,945	$ 131,004,556	$ 67,088,609	$ 13,641,678
2007	$ 239,955,044	$ 133,975,947	$ 71,016,098	$ 13,936,849
2008	$ 236,667,471	$ 132,970,457	$ 70,046,954	$ 13,768,683
2009	$ 230,505,668	$ 130,911,165	$ 68,187,612	$ 13,446,468
2010	$ 235,414,168	$ 132,427,895	$ 69,026,898	$ 13,670,875
2011	$ 232,372,510	$ 132,332,017	$ 70,010,541	$ 13,783,253
2012	$ 246,144,512	$ 138,903,876	$ 72,000,000	$ 14,385,728
2013	$ 244,764,848	$ 138,554,999	$ 74,500,000	$ 14,295,934
2014	$ 245,708,290	$ 138,741,873	$ 74,291,352	$ 14,435,510
2015	$ 250,025,840	$ 144,914,052	$ 75,020,240	$ 14,806,722
2016	$ 272,017,364	$ 157,300,767	$ 78,205,450	$ 16,017,493
2017	$ 258,030,943	$ 149,709,855	$ 75,255,881	$ 15,325,980
2018	$ 268,948,805	$ 157,890,979	$ 74,726,543	$ 15,881,181
2019	$ 295,282,190	$ 172,676,708	$ 74,909,328	$ 17,327,773
TOTALS	$6,241,527,767	$3,432,048,481	$1,858,969,076	$ 357,708,339

== Distribution of funds ==
Since the Kansas Lottery's start-up in November 1987, through June 30, 2019, Lottery ticket sales have produced $357,708,339 in revenues transferred to the State of Kansas. The Lottery's Fiscal Year 2019, which ended June 30, 2019, produced $295.3 million in sales and $173.6 million transferred to the state.

The Kansas Lottery Act requires that a minimum of 45 percent of total sales be paid back to the players through the prize fund. In fiscal year 2019 (July 1, 2018 through June 30, 2019), the Kansas Lottery paid out 56 percent in prizes. The State Gaming Revenues Fund received 29 percent of ticket sales; cost of sales was 4 percent (which covers online vendor fees, telecommunications costs and instant ticket printing); 6 percent was paid to Lottery retailers for commissions and bonuses; and 5 percent covered administrative expenses (salaries, advertising, depreciation, professional services and other administrative expenses.) The State Gaming Revenues Fund (SGRF) is funded through monthly transfers from the Kansas Lottery. Transfers are then made from the Gaming Fund to funds dedicated to economic development initiatives, prison construction and maintenance projects, local juvenile detention facilities, problem gambling assistance, and the State General Fund.

Of the first $50 million, $80,000 is transferred to the Problem Gambling and Addictions Grant Fund. Of the remaining $49.92 million, 85 percent of the remainder transferred to the Economic Development Initiatives Fund, 10 percent to the Correctional Institutions Building Fund, and 5 percent to the Juvenile Detention Facilities Fund. Any receipts in excess of $50 million must be transferred to the State General Fund.

All net profits from Kansas Lottery Veterans Benefit scratch tickets are dedicated to veterans' and military programs. In fiscal year 2009, the Lottery transferred $1,628,958 to benefit veterans' programs and National Guard scholarships.

Gaming Revenues Fund – Fiscal Year 2009

Economic Development Initiatives Fund	$42,432,000
Juvenile Detention Facilities Fund	$2,496,000
Correctional Institutions Building Fund	$4,992,000
Problem Gambling Grant Fund	$80,000
State General Fund	$15,621,042

=== Economic Development Initiatives Fund Fiscal Year 2010 Recommendations ===
The primary recipients of monies from the Economic Development Initiatives Fund (EDIF) in Fiscal Year 2010 (July 1, 2009 through June 30, 2010) will be the Kansas Department of Commerce, Kansas Technology Enterprise Corporation, Wichita State University Aviation Research and the Kansas Board of Regents.

Kansas Department of Commerce

Operating Grant	$15,408,558
Older Kansans Employment Program	$323,779
Rural Opportunity Program	$2,056,395
KTEC Grant Programs	$7,534,430
Senior Community Service Employment	$4,234
Kansas Commission on Disability Concerns	$229,127
Strong Military Bases Program	$367,456
TOTAL – Kansas Department of Commerce	$25,923,979

Operating Grant: The operating grant from the EDIF supports Commerce's traditional programs, including Attraction Development Grants and the Kansas Industrial Training and Retraining programs.

Older Kansans Employment Program: This program is designed to provide older Kansans, 55 and over, with an employment placement service. The emphasis is on providing jobs in the private sector taking into account non-traditional patterns of employment.

Rural Opportunity Program: This program helps attract investment, business development and job growth in rural areas of the state. It provides additional funding for the Center for Entrepreneurship, Kansas Main Street and Capacity Building Grants.

KTEC Grant Programs: The Kansas Technology Enterprise Corporation (KTEC) provides research support, direct company investments and business assistance. KTEC's philosophy targets sustainable economic leadership through technological innovation and business acceleration.

Senior Community Service Employment Program: This program provides Kansans aged 55 and over with employment placement services with emphasis on employment in the private sector.

Kansas Commission on Disability Concerns: The KCDC provides policy recommendations to the State of Kansas on changes to laws, regulations and programs that affect people with disabilities. The KCDC also provides information and training to the public.

Strong Military Bases Program: This program supports ongoing efforts of the Governor's Military Council to prevent the closure or downsizing of the state's military bases.

Board of Regents

Vocational Education Capital Outlay	$2,565,000
Technology Innovation & Internship	$2,745,500
TOTAL – Board of Regents	$180,500

Vocational Education Capital Outlay: This program provides grant money to community colleges and technical schools and colleges, primarily to help purchase equipment. The program requires a 50 percent match from the institutions.

Technology Innovation & Internship: This grant program allows instructors from community colleges and technical schools and colleges to intern in private industry for short periods to expand their knowledge. The grant requires a one-to-one match. This program also provides funding for innovative equipment for students.

Kansas State University

Extension System and AG Research Programs	$293,911
TOTAL – Kansas State University	$293,911

Extension System and Agriculture Research Programs' Cooperative Extension Program: Kansas State uses this funding for a variety of operating expenses.

Wichita State University

Aviation Research	$4,948,577
Aviation Classroom Training Equipment	$2,500,000
TOTAL – Wichita State University	$7,448,577

National Institute for Aviation Research Grant: This funding will build on previous state initiatives and help ensure the continuation of a strong aviation infrastructure in the state. The funding will also assist in securing federal resources.

Aviation Classroom Training Equipment: The State is a partner with Wichita aviation companies, the City of Wichita and Sedgwick County in the development of the national Center for Aviation Training. The center will enable thousands of Kansans to be trained for high-paying jobs in the aviation industry.

== Current draw games ==
=== In-house draw games ===
==== Pick 3 ====
Pick 3 is drawn twice daily, seven times a week. Prices, prizes, and options vary.

==== Keno ====
Keno is played seven days a week. Prices, prizes, and options vary. Keno is available at retailers with a Keno monitor. A computer randomly selects 20 numbers every 4 minutes. Drawings are from 5:00 a.m. to 1:52 a.m. daily.

==== Super Kansas Cash ====
Super Kansas Cash is an enhanced version of the former Kansas Cash game. Super Kansas Cash offers players two game for $1, with a chance to win prizes including a jackpot that pays winners in lump sum. It uses a 5+1 matrix that draws 5 numbers 1-32 plus 1 number 1-25 from a second set (similar to Powerball, Hot Lotto, and Mega Millions). Super Kansas Cash is played on Mondays, Wednesdays, and Saturdays. The jackpots begin at $100,000.

=== Multi-jurisdictional games ===
==== 2by2 ====
2by2 is currently played in Kansas, Nebraska, and North Dakota; it is drawn daily. 2by2 draws two red numbers 1-26 and two white numbers 1-26. Games cost $1 each. There are eight ways to win. The top prize is $22,000; it is doubled if it is won on a Tuesday and the prize is from a seven-day ticket.

==== Lucky for Life ====
In 2009, the Connecticut Lottery began Lucky-4-Life, which used a double matrix. Three years later the game became Lucky for Life and added five states. In September 2013 the game added a second "lifetime" prize tier, and gave annuity winners the option of receiving cash value.

The current double matrix began in January 2015; players choose 5 of 48 "white balls", and a green "Lucky Ball" from a second pool, of 18 numbers. Lucky for Life, as of July 2017, is available in 23 states and the District of Columbia; Kansas joined in November 2016.

==== Mega Millions ====
On January 31, 2010, Kansas joined Mega Millions. (In 2009, the Mega Millions consortium and MUSL reached an agreement to cross-sell Mega Millions and Powerball.) The current format for Mega Millions began in October 2013. It is drawn Tuesdays and Fridays.

==== Powerball ====
Since 1988, Kansas has been a member of MUSL. Powerball began in 1992. Its jackpots currently start at $40 million; it is drawn Wednesday and Saturday nights.
