= List of bookmakers =

A bookmaker is an organisation or a person that takes bets on sporting and other events at agreed upon odds.

== Organisations ==
=== Current ===
==== Europe ====
- 888sport (Gibraltar, owned by 888 Holdings)
- Bet365 (United Kingdom, owned by the Coates family)
- Betclic (France / Malta, owned by Stéphane Courbit and SBM)
- Betfair (United Kingdom, owned by Flutter)
- Betfred (United Kingdom / Gibraltar, owned by Fred Done)
- Betsson (Sweden / Malta)
- BetVictor (Gibraltar, owned by Michael Tabor)
- Betway (Malta / Guernsey)
- Boylesports (Ireland)
- Bwin (Austria, owned by Entain)
- Eurofootball (Bulgaria)
- Fonbet (Russia)
- Coral (United Kingdom, owned by Entain)
- Ladbrokes (United Kingdom, owned by Entain)
- LeoVegas (Sweden)
- Liga Stavok (Russia)
- Marathonbet (Russia)
- Niké (Slovakia)
- Paddy Power (Ireland, owned by Flutter)
- SBOBET (Isle of Man / Philippines, owned by Celton Manx)
- Sky Bet (United Kingdom, owned by Flutter)
- Sportingbet (United Kingdom, owned by Entain)
- The Tote (United Kingdom)
- Totolotek (Poland)
- Unibet (Malta, owned by the Kindred Group)
- William Hill (United Kingdom)

==== Africa ====
- Bet9ja (Nigeria, owned by Ayo Ojuroye and Kunle Soname)
- Betika (Kenya)
- Hollywoodbets (South Africa)
- SportPesa (Kenya)

==== Americas ====
- BetMGM (United States, co-owned by MGM Resorts International and Entain)
- BetUS (Costa Rica)
- MyBookie (Costa Rica)
- DraftKings (United States)
- FanDuel (United States, owned by Flutter)
- Pinnacle Sports (Curaçao)
- TwinSpires (United States)
- Xpressbet (United States)

==== Asia-Pacific ====
- Betfair Australia (Australia, owned by Crown Resorts)
- Betstar (Australia,)
- Dafabet (Philippines, owned by AsianBGE)
- Palmerbet (Australia,)
- Sportsbet.com.au (Australia, owned by Flutter)
- Tabcorp (Australia,)

=== Former ===
- BetEasy
- Centrebet
- Stanley Leisure

== People ==
- John Zancocchio (1954-)
- Victor Chandler (1951–)
- Barney Eastwood (1932–2020)
- Philip Giaccone (1932–1981)
- Freddie Williams (1942–2008)
- William Hill (1903–1971)
- Martin Krugman (1919–1979)
- Frank Rosenthal (1929–2008)
- Cyril Stein (1928–2011)
- Helen Vernet (1876–1956)
