= List of mergers and acquisitions in online gambling =

The online gambling industry has seen an increase of mergers and acquisitions in recent years. This has been caused by a number of factors including saturation of the market, consolidation in fragmented markets, the repeal of PASPA in the U.S. and a greater desire for economies of scale. Below is a list of notable deals.

== 2025 ==
- Flutter Entertainment acquired NSX Group
- CasinoRIX acquired Innovate Change

== 2024 ==
- LeoVegas (MGM) acquired Tipico
- Hard Rock Digital acquired Evoke's U.S. consumer-facing assets
- Boyd Gaming acquired Resorts Digital by Resorts Atlantic City
- Flutter Entertainment acquired Snaitech

== 2023 ==
- Dave Portnoy acquires Barstool Sports from Penn Entertainment
- betFIRST acquired by Betsson
- Penn Entertainment acquires Barstool Sports
- Flutter acquires MaxBet
- Entain CEE (Entain + Emma Capital) acquired STS Holding for £750m

== 2022 ==
- William Hill International acquired by 888
- Supergroup (Betway) merges with Sports Entertainment Acquisition Corporation
- LeoVegas acquired by MGM

== 2021 ==
- William Hill acquired by Caesars Entertainment
- Entain acquires Enlabs

== 2020 ==
- Zecure Gaming Limited, the B2C subsidiary of Gaming Innovation Group acquired by Betsson
- Bet.pt acquired by GVC
- Eldorado Resorts acquired Caesars Entertainment, retain Caesars Entertainment name.
- The Stars Group (including Sky Betting & Gaming) acquired by Flutter
- SBTech acquired by Draftkings
- Evolution Acquiring NetEnt

== 2019 ==
- CG Technology acquired by William Hill
- Stride Gaming acquired by Rank Group
- Costa Bingo, City Bingo and Sing Bingo acquired by 888
- Betbright acquired by 888
- Adjarabet acquired by Flutter
- Mr Green acquired by William Hill

== 2018 ==
- Neds.com.au (Australia) acquired by GVC
- FanDuel acquired by Paddy Power Betfair
- Sky Bet acquired by The Stars Group
- Ladbrokes Coral acquired by GVC
- Crystalbet acquired by GVC
- William Hill Australia acquired by The Stars Group
- Crownbet acquired by The Stars Group
- IPS acquired by LeoVegas

== 2017 ==
- Tabcorp merger with Tatts Group
- Mondogoal acquired by Global Daily Fantasy Sports
- Royal Panda acquired by LeoVegas
- NYX acquired by Scientific Games
- Forbet acquired by Fortuna
- Winga.it acquired by LeoVegas
- RCS Gaming (gazzabet.it) acquired by Sportpesa
- Football Pools acquired by OpCapita
- Touchbet acquired by Sporting Index
- NetplayTV acquired by Betsson
- Premier Casino acquired by Betsson
- 32Red acquired by Kindred Group
- Dansk Underholding Limited acquired by Mr Green
- Draft acquired by Paddy Power Betfair
- Hattrick Sports Group acquired by Fortuna

== 2016 ==
- Betfair merged with Paddy Power (now Flutter Entertainment)
- Ladbrokes merged with Gala Coral (now Ladbrokes Coral)
- Bwin Party acquired by GVC
- Sisal acquired by CVC Capital Partners
- Tipico (majority stake) acquired by CVC Capital Partners
- Best Gaming Technology (BGT) acquired by Playtech
- Grand Parade acquired by William Hill
- SBAT acquired by Catena Media
- Open Bet acquired by NYX Gaming
- Inspired Gaming acquired by Hydra Industries (renamed Inspired Entertainment Inc)
- TonyBet acquired by Betsson

== 2015 ==
- Sky Betting and Gaming (majority stake) acquired by CVC Capital Partners
- International Game Technology acquired by GTECH (later renamed IGT)
- Chartwell and Cryptologic (sold by Amaya) acquired by NYX Gaming
- HRTV (now TVG2) acquired by Betfair
- Stan James acquired by Unibet
- Gala Bingo (sold by Gala Coral) acquired by Caledonia Investments plc
- iGame Group acquired by Unibet
- Yoyo Games acquired by Playtech

== 2014 ==
- Rational Group (PokerStars) acquired by Amaya
- Probability Plc acquired by GTECH
- Betstar acquired by Ladbrokes
- Oranje Casino and Kroon Casino acquired by Betsson

== 2013 ==
- Betdaq acquired by Ladbrokes
- Gaming Investments (Bookmaker.com.au) acquired by Ladbrokes
- Tom Waterhouse acquired by William Hill
- Centrebet and Sportingbet (Australia) acquired by William Hill
- Sportingbet acquired by GVC.
- Blue Square acquired by Betfair
- Gala Casinos acquired by Rank Group

== 2012 ==
- American Wagering Inc acquired by William Hill
- Cryptologic acquired by Amaya
- Nordic Betting (Bet24) acquired by Unibet
- Ongame (sold by Bwin) acquired by Amaya

== 2011 ==
- PartyGaming merged with Bwin (to create Bwin.Party)
- Centrebet acquired by Sportingbet
- Betsafe acquired by Betsson
- Cayetano acquired by Paddy Power

== 2010 ==
- Sportsbet.com.au acquired by Paddy Power
- Virtue Fusion acquired by Playtech

== 2009 ==
- TVG acquired by Betfair
- World Poker Tour (WPT) acquired by Party Poker

== 2008 ==
- Betterbet.com acquired by Stan James

== 2007 ==
- Oddschecker acquired by BSkyB (now Sky Betting and Gaming)
- Sponsio acquired by Ladbrokes
- Maria Holdings acquired by Unibet

== 2006 ==
- Bowmans.com acquired by Bet365
- GTECH acquired by Lottomatica (later renamed GTECH)
- Timeform acquired by Betfair

== 2005 ==
- Gala merged with Coral Eurobet (to create Gala Coral)
- PokerChamps.com acquired by Betfair
- Ongame acquired by Bwin

== 2004 ==
- Casino Club acquired by GVC

== 2003 ==
- Blue Square acquired by Rank

== 2001 ==
- Flutter.com merged with Betfair

== 2000 ==
- Sports Internet Group acquired by BSkyB (now Sky Betting and Gaming)

== See also ==
- List of largest mergers and acquisitions
- Category:Gambling companies of the United Kingdom
- Category:Mergers and acquisitions
