= Betiton =

Gambling comparison website

- Type: Private
- Industry: Affiliate marketing, online gambling media
- Founded: 2020
- Founder: Arnaud Serour
- Headquarters: Malta
- Area served: United Kingdom, Ireland, Canada, New Zealand, and other regulated markets
- Products: Casino and sportsbook reviews, odds comparisons, betting tools
- Owner: Sharp Connection Ltd
- Website: betiton.com

Betiton is an online publisher of casino and sportsbook reviews and comparisons, with localized editions for regulated gambling markets including the United Kingdom, Ireland, Canada, and New Zealand. The website launched in February 2020 as an online casino and sportsbook, and relaunched as a review and comparison platform in early 2026.

== History ==
Betiton was founded in February 2020 by Arnaud Serour and is operated by Sharp Connection Ltd, a Malta-registered iGaming company. The brand launched as an online casino and sportsbook on the Aspire Global platform, under licences from the Malta Gaming Authority and the United Kingdom Gambling Commission, which allowed it to serve players in the United Kingdom, Ireland, New Zealand, and Canada. In 2022, it was awarded SiGMA’s Marketing Campaign of the Year. In late 2024, it was licensed by the Alcohol and Gaming Commission of Ontario to operate in the Canadian province of Ontario.

In early 2026, Betiton ceased operating as a gambling provider and relaunched betiton.com as a casino and sportsbook comparison website. As of July 2026, www.betiton.com is recorded as an inactive domain on the United Kingdom Gambling Commission's public register, and Betiton no longer appears on iGaming Ontario's list of licensed operators.
