= Eskander (surname) =

Eskander is a surname. Notable people with the surname include:

- Alan Eskander (born 1975), Australian entrepreneur and licensed bookmaker
- Saad Eskander (born 1962), Iraqi Kurdish academic and researcher
