= Jenny Watson =

Jenny Watson may refer to:

- Jenny Watson (civil servant)
- Jenny Watson (artist)
