= Mark Blandford (entrepreneur) =

British venture capitalist and founder of Sportingbet Plc

Mark Blandford (born 1957 in Hereford) is the founder of Sportingbet plc, at one time the world's largest bookmaking operation and a pioneer in online gambling. Blandford is also the former chairman and CEO.

== Sportingbet ==
Blandford was one of the earliest offline bookmakers to see the potential for sports betting online. Previously the owner of a traditional ‘bricks and mortar’ bookmaking operation for over 15 years, Mark recognized the potential of the internet in the mid-1990s and sold his chain to Tote Bookmakers in 1997. In October 1998 he launched Sportingbet and in January 2001 the Company floated on the London Stock Exchange's Alternative Investment Market in a landmark transaction for the online gaming industry. With Sportingbet, Blandford went on to be voted AIM Entrepreneur of the Year in 2002 and later earned the company the honour of AIM Transaction of the Year in 2005. Blandford left day-to-day operations at Sportingbet in 2006 and now works as a venture capital investor.

== Investing career ==
After Sportingbet, Blandford managed a venture capital fund focusing on the leisure sector. The fund, called Valhalla Investments, made a handful of investments in the online gambling industry. Industry analysts pay close attention to Blandford's investments and he is a featured speaker at many gaming industry events. Publicly disclosed investments include FSB Tech and the 2014 EGR Gaming Affiliate of the Year Gambling.com Group (formerly KAX Media). Blandford is the chairman of Gambling.com Group Ltd. The company filed form F-1 to U.S. Securities and Exchange Commission on 25 June 2021. In January 2022 the company completed the acquisition of RotoWire and in February 2022 the company acquired online portal BonusFinder.com.

At present, Blandford is a partner at Burlywood Capital. Blandford has also invested in educational tech company, University Compare, founded by UK entrepreneur Owen O'Neill, which aims to provide university information and solutions to key stage four students.

In 2023 Blandford also became an advisor for B90 Holdings PLC which owns and operates Bet90.com, Spinbookie.com and the Norwegian sports community Oddsen.nu.

== See also ==
- Peter Dicks
