= OGRA =

OGRA may refer to:

- Oil and Gas Regulatory Authority, an agency of the government of Pakistan
- Ogra, a commune in Mureș County, Transylvania, Romania
- Online Gambling Regulation Act 2001, legislation underpinning the Isle of Man Gambling Supervision Commission
