= Sportsbet =

Australian online bookmaker

Sportsbet Pty Ltd.
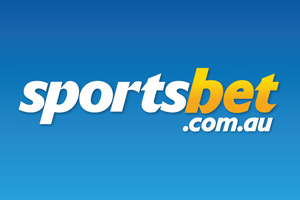
- Type: Subsidiary
- Industry: Online gambling
- Founded: May 1993; 33 years ago in Darwin, Australia
- Headquarters: Melbourne, Australia
- Key people: Barni Evans, Sportsbet CEO
- Owner: Flutter Entertainment
- Number of employees: ▲869
- Website: sportsbet.com.au

Sportsbet is an online gambling company owned by Flutter Entertainment, primarily targeting the Australian market. Founded in Darwin, Northern Territory, Sportsbet is licensed as a corporate bookmaker in the Northern Territory under the Racing and Betting Act 1993 (NT).

Sportsbet is headquartered in Melbourne and seeks to operate within the boundaries set by multiple Australian regulatory authorities at a federal and state level. This regulation involves varying restrictions on products and promotional activities that can be offered by licensed corporate bookmakers in Australia.

The company was acquired by Paddy Power in December 2010, and since 2 February 2016, it has been owned by Flutter Entertainment.

== History ==
The business name Sportsbet Australia was first registered in 1994, with domain name registered in 1999.

In May 2009, 51% was acquired by Paddy Power, who continued brand name and company operation as a separate entity, while offering additional services. The takeover allowed to acquire rival betting company International All Sports Limited, for 27.2 million euros.

In March 2011, Paddy Power took full ownership of Sportsbet.

Paddy Power and British rival Betfair agreed terms for a merger on 8 September 2015. The business is owned 52% by the former Paddy Power shareholders and 48% by the former Betfair shareholders. The merger was completed on 2 February 2016. On 5 April 2016, it was announced that 650 jobs in United Kingdom and Ireland would be lost at the company.

On 6 March 2019, Paddy Power Bet Fair announced that it would rebrand as Flutter Entertainment, pending shareholder approval at the company's annual general meeting in May. Flutter was originally the name of a betting exchange acquired by Betfair in December 2001. The company stated that the rebrand, which took place on 28 May 2019, would not affect the company's individual customer facing gaming brands.

In May 2020, the global merger between Flutter Entertainment and The Stars Group was finalized following regulatory and shareholder approvals. Sportsbet and BetEasy formed the Australian component of the merger. Incumbent CEO of Sportsbet Barni Evans was appointed to lead the combined Sportsbet and BetEasy businesses, with a decision made to move forward with the sole Sportsbet brand, retiring the BetEasy brand following a period of migration and integration.

In November 2021, Sportsbet lost more than $50 million due the oddsmakers mistake.

== Markets ==
=== Sport ===
Sportsbet has markets for 24 different sports: American football, Australian rules football, baseball, basketball, boxing, cricket, cycling, darts, Gaelic football, golf, handball, ice hockey, motorsports, rugby league, rugby union, snooker, soccer, "sports novelties", table tennis, tennis, mixed martial arts (MMA), volleyball and waterpolo.

=== Politics ===
Sportsbet has markets for elections in many countries. These include federal, state and territory elections in Australia, federal elections in Canada, general elections in New Zealand and the United Kingdom, presidential elections in the United States. This includes markets such as "Democratic/Republican presidential nominee", "next Labor/Liberal leader", "next Conservative/Labour leader" and "year of the next Australian federal election". It has also included special markers such as "next NSW Liberal leader" for the 2023 NSW Liberal Party leadership election, "next Western Australian Premier" (following the resignation of Mark McGowan) and "next state/territory to elect a Liberal government" following the 2023 New South Wales state election, which saw the Labor Party hold power federally and in every mainland state or territory, leaving Tasmania as the only state with a Liberal government.

However, political odds on Sportsbet have faced controversy before.

=== Entertainment ===
Sportsbet has markets for several television programs when they occur, including reality television programs and award shows amongst others.

== Controversies ==
=== 2019 federal election ===
For the 2019 Australian federal election, Sportsbet tipped the Labor Party, led by Bill Shorten, to defeat the incumbent Coalition government, led by Scott Morrison. Sportsbet paid out all bets for Labor winning the election two days before the election, which was won by the Coalition and Morrison was re-elected Prime Minister. Sportsbet lost over $5.2 million due to the early payout for an incorrect result. Furthermore, Sportsbet had allowed wagers on the Family First Party to win the 2019 election, which had a 1000/1 chance to win despite the party being dissolved in 2017.

=== Class action lawsuit ===
In December 2024, Maurice Blackburn filed a class action lawsuit in the Supreme Court of Victoria, alleging that its in-play bets (also known as live bets) made during sporting events were illegal because they required customers to call Sportsbet over the phone to obtain a code as part of placing a bet, resulting in a bet that occurred after the sporting event. The case is scheduled to go to trial in August 2026.

=== Fines by regulators ===
In March 2021, Sportsbet was fined $22,000 by Liquor & Gaming NSW for publishing a full-page ad in The Daily Telegraph on June 13, 2020.

In November 2021, Sportsbet was fined $135,000 by Liquor & Gaming NSW for sending emails to customers who had withdrawn consent to receive marketing direct marketing between October 2020 to March 2021 and for carrying out prohibited gambling advertisements on its social media.

In February 2022, the Australian Communications and Media Authority fined Sportsbet $2.5 million and ordered it to pay $1.2 million to customers after breaching Australia's spam laws when it sent 150,000 marketing text messages and emails to over 37,000 customers between January 2020 and March 2021 who had tried to unsubscribe. Furthermore, Sportsbet had sent over 3,000 marketing texts that had no unsubscribe function. In December 2025, an Australian Broadcasting Corporation investigation found that Sportsbet had attempted to "water down" the enforcement announcement by the Australian Communications and Media Authority by petitioning it to change quotes in the announcement.

In December 2024, Guardian Australia reported that a father had complained about Sportsbet advertising being played on Spotify between children's songs from Disney, the Wiggles and Bluey, which led Sportsbet to state that it required all digital platforms it advertised on to implement age gating measures, and that it had withdrawn its advertising from Spotify. Seven days later, the same newspaper reported that Sportsbet had published filters on Snapchat that, whilst they could only be used by people over the age of eighteen, could be shared with underage users after the images had been generated. These filters were reported to include a racehorse wearing a rosette containing the Sportsbet colours and logo with another Sportsbet logo at the top of the screen, as well as a presenter with a Sportsbet-themed microphone. The Snapchat advertising was condemned by numerous Australian federal politicians, including Monique Ryan, Sarah Hanson-Young, Andrew Wilkie and Kate Chaney.

In July 2025, Sportsbet was fined $92,500 NT Racing and Wagering Commission for sending marketing messages to several customers who had self-excluded or were taking a break from the platform.

In December 2025, Sportsbet was fined $313,140 by the NT Racing and Wagering Commission for failing to provide customers with activity statements between 2022 and 2024. The fine was criticised by Monash University's Gambling and Social Determinants Unit as being "virtually nothing" and a "slap on the wrist".
