= Isle of Man Gambling Supervision Commission =

British regulatory body

The Isle of Man Gambling Supervision Commission (Manx: Barrantee Oaseirys Karrooghys Vannin) (formerly the Gambling Control Commission) is the Gaming Control Board of the Isle of Man. It regulates most forms of gambling in its territory including land based (casino, amusement and slot machines, betting offices and lotteries) and online gambling services.

The Commission was established in 1962 to protect the interests of gamblers in the Island by ensuring that gambling remains fair and crime-free and that players receive their winnings. It gained worldwide notice with the advent of online gambling in the early 21st Century due to the Isle's reputation as a tax-friendly jurisdiction. It was one of the first jurisdictions to offer legislation to regulate the activity of e-gaming companies and create a secure atmosphere for the gamblers. One of the main documents underpinning the activity of the Commission is the Online Gambling Regulation Act 2001 (OGRA).

The first Isle of Man licence to operate a live dealer in online casino gaming was given to Celton Manx in February 2009.

The first Isle of Man sub-licence was issued to Know How Gaming, successfully applied for by licensed Corporate Services Provider, ILS World.

== Functions ==
The Commission deals with:

- Licensing and regulation of the gaming operators.
- Guidance and cooperation at all stages of the application process.
- Protection of player's funds – the organisation makes sure that their licensees have appropriate systems that regulate player's funds. All the money deposited and withdrawn from the licensed sites is secure and can be enforced by law.
- External testing of games – the Commission approves independent testing facilities to ensure the randomness of results of all games of chance. All companies seeking to be licensed by the Isle of Man have to test their software systems with one of the companies approved by the Commission.
- Monitoring – the activities of the licensed operators (including marketing activities) are constantly monitored by the Commission to ensure their compliance with the law and principles of fair gaming.
- Investigation of complaints concerning the licensees on behalf of the players.

The Commission can't enforce any operator to return the stakes that have been voluntary placed and lost in a fair game, but it can provide advice and assistance in enforcing the deposited money and the actual winnings.

== Commissioners ==
- Jon Allen, Deputy Chair, - present
- Howard Callow, Commissioner, - present
- David Reynolds, Commissioner, - present
- Suzanne Collins, Commissioner, - present

== Status ==
As the Isle of Man is a British Crown Dependency, they have their own government and legislation, therefore gambling legislation and licensing requirements do not have to be the same as in the UK. Nevertheless, this jurisdiction has very strict rules and therefore was one of the countries named in the whitelist of the UK Gambling Commission and allowed to advertise their services on the territory of the United Kingdom. This means that the Isle of Man gambling jurisdiction met the UK government's regulatory requirements regarding the openness, fairness and security of the licensed online gambling operators.

As of 2020 the Commission licenses several well-known online gambling companies. The list of current licence holders of the Gambling Supervision Commission is provided on their website.
