= SBOBet =

Online bookmaker

Sports Bookie Online, Inc.
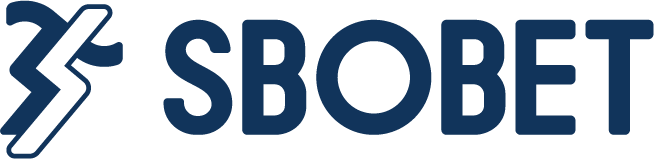
- Company type: Private Limited
- Website type: Online gambling
- Available in: Multilingual
- Founded: 2004; 22 years ago
- Area served: International
- Industry: Gambling
- Products: Sports betting, online casino
- Website: www.sbobet.com

SBOBet (stylised as SBOBET, an initialism for Sports Bookie Online) is an online bookmaker. The website has operations in Asia licensed by the Philippines and operations in Europe licensed by the Isle of Man to operate as an international sports bookmaker. The company offers online gambling on all major sports, online games, racing (parimutuel betting), financial betting and poker in multiple languages.

In February 2009, the Isle of Man-based operations of SBOBet became the first operator licensed in Isle of Man to be granted approval to launch a live dealer casino from the island.

In October 2014, SBOBet launched in the financial betting sector in partnership with Tradologic. The financial binary products were launched under both Isle of Man OGRA licence and Philippines CEZA-First Cagayan licence.

== Sponsorship ==
SBOBet have been the sponsors for various football teams like English teams West Ham United, Leeds United and Fulham, Irish teams Wexford Youth, Dundalk and St Patrick's Athletic, Welsh team Cardiff City, Indonesian team Persikabo 1973, and Indian team Mohun Bagan Super Giant, using the alias of SBOTop.net. Due to concerns raised by representatives of the Premier League about exposing youth to gambling, SBOBet replaced their logo on all Cardiff City youth academy team shirts with that of the Ty Hafan Children's Hospice.

Celton Manx, operator of SBOBet's European subsidiary, was the official Asian betting partner of Swansea City A.F.C., West Ham United F.C., Southampton F.C., Hull City A.F.C. and Norwich City F.C. for the 2013–14 season.

SBOBet were the title sponsors for the first Soccerex Asian Forum held in Singapore.

== Awards ==
At the annual EGR Awards organized by eGaming Review Magazine, SBOBet was awarded the "Asian Operator of the Year" award for year 2009 and 2010. SBOBet ranks 11th on the list of Power 50 companies in eGaming Review's 2011 ranking of the 50 most influential operators.

== Controversy ==
In October 2008, SBOBet was asked to turn over any evidence they might have on the possible match fixing scandal in The Football Association (FA) championship between Norwich City and Derby County. SBOBet denied the FA's request, deeming it was "excessive" and would be a breach of customer privacy. Derby County won the game 2–1. In the end, the FA found no evidence that match fixing had taken place.

On 24 September 2009, two Bulgarian news agencies Novinite.com and 24 Chasa Daily published articles that wrongly suggested that SBOBet was responsible for fixing the football match between Levski and CSKA Sofia. The two agencies subsequently published correction articles, stating that SBOBet was not involved in any match-fixing scams, and apologized to SBOBet for publishing the untrue information.

In October 2009, representatives of the Premier League criticised SBOBet for offering live betting on academy football games, maintaining that children and youth activities should not be exposed by international gambling organisations. The bookmaker subsequently suspended betting on academy games and expressed its intention to seek clarification from the Premier League and the Professional Footballers' Association about which football markets it should be allowed to offer.

In October 2014, Singapore Parliament passed the Remote Gambling Bill to ban the entire spectrum of remote gambling, including internet, telephone, interactive television, radio and any other communication technology. The bill was effective to individual gamblers, facilitators, runners and operators. Although the new law came into operation from 2 February 2015, SBOBet stated that it had a policy not to take bets from countries where making or accepting bets is illegal but the overwhelming majority of its customers come from mainland China where betting is illegal and betting customers often face arrest. New accounts from Singapore IP address were hence not accepted and there is no Singapore in the drop-down list in the sign-up page, though these can be easily by-passed through the use of a VPN. All accounts were closed from 1 February 2015, complying with the law. With effect from 12 February 2015, access to SBOBet is blocked.
