= Gentoo Media =

Online gambling company

Gentoo Media Inc.
- Company type: Public company
- Traded as: OSE: G2MNO; Nasdaq Stockholm: G2M
- ISIN: US36467X2062
- Industry: iGaming, affiliate marketing, B2B
- Founded: 2007; 19 years ago as Rebel Penguin, rebranded to Gentoo Media in 2024 after spin-off from Gaming Innovation Group
- Headquarters: Malta
- Number of locations: Malta, Belgrade, Copenhagen, Valencia, Norwich
- Area served: Worldwide
- Key people: Jonas Warrer (CEO); Mikael Riese Harsted (Chairman of the Board)
- Brands: AskGamblers; Casinomeister; Casinotopsonline; WSN.com; Time2Play
- Revenue: €124.5 million (2024)
- Operating income: €57.2 million (2024)
- Subsidiaries: iGamingCloud Ltd.
- Website: https://www.gentoomedia.com

Gentoo Media Inc. (often referred to as Gentoo) is a publicly traded company operating in the iGaming affiliate marketing industry. It manages a network of over 150 websites, directing traffic to licensed online casinos and sports betting operators. The company focuses on lead generation, content marketing, and compliance monitoring in regulated gambling markets.

Formerly known as GiG Media, the company was part of Gaming Innovation Group (GiG) until September 2024, when it became an independent entity.

Gentoo Media is listed on Nasdaq Stockholm (ticker: G2M) and, as of early 2025, is in the process of delisting from Euronext Oslo Børs (ticker: G2MNO), subject to shareholder and regulatory approval.

== History ==
=== 2007-2017: Origins and early development ===
Gentoo Media's origins trace back to 2007, when Rebel Penguin, an affiliate marketing company, was founded in Copenhagen, Denmark. In 2012, Gaming Innovation Group (GiG) was established, later expanding into affiliate marketing.

In 2015, GiG launched its affiliate division, Innovation Labs, later rebranded as GiG Media. In 2017, GiG acquired Rebel Penguin, integrating it into its affiliate marketing operations.

=== 2018-2023: Expansion and business separation ===
Throughout the late 2010s and early 2020s, GiG Media expanded its portfolio of affiliate websites, focusing on digital marketing and compliance tools for the iGaming industry.

In 2023, GiG separated its affiliate marketing and platform divisions into two independent publicly listed companies. The separation was aimed at establishing distinct business structures for each entity.

=== 2024-present: Formation of Gentoo Media ===
In September 2024, GiG Media was officially rebranded as Gentoo Media, following its spin-off from GiG Platform & Sportsbook.

In 2023 and 2024, Gentoo Media acquired several iGaming-related websites and businesses, including AskGamblers, KaFeRocks, Time2Play, Casinomeister and Titan Inc.

In the fourth quarter of 2024, Gentoo Media reported €35.9 million in revenue, reflecting a 38% increase compared to the same quarter in 2023.

On January 30, 2025, Gentoo Media announced plans to delist from Euronext Oslo Børs while maintaining its listing on Nasdaq Stockholm. The company cited a shift in investor focus from Norway to Sweden and limited trading liquidity on the Oslo exchange as key reasons for the decision. The delisting remains subject to shareholder approval at a special meeting in March 2025, followed by regulatory approval from Euronext Oslo Børs. If approved, the delisting is expected to take effect by the end of the second quarter of 2025.

In February 2026, it was reported that Atlas SEO, a subsidiary of Gentoo Media, would be closing its Norwich office with over 50 employees at risk of redundancy. Gentoo had purchased the company for a reported £2.71m less than two years previously.

== Business model and operations ==
Gentoo Media operates as an affiliate marketing company, directing traffic from its websites to online gambling operators. The company’s primary activities include:

- Lead generation: Connecting players with online gambling platforms.
- Content and SEO marketing: Managing a portfolio of over 150 websites that provide reviews, betting guides, and industry insights.
- Compliance monitoring: Utilising Sitebee (formerly GiG Comply), a software designed to track marketing compliance across regulated markets.

Gentoo Media’s digital marketing efforts span multiple channels, including search engines, social media platforms, and email marketing.

== Key Websites ==
Gentoo Media operates several media websites and traffic generating channels engaging the end-user, turning users into leads to operators.

=== AskGamblers.com ===
AskGamblers.com is a casino affiliate website that features online casino information and reviews, bonus listings, online gambling news, a complaint service, and a gaming community. The company was founded by Igor Šalindrija in 2005 in Belgrade, Serbia. In 2009, AskGamblers launched AskGamblers Casino Complaint Service, a player complaint resolution service, with the aim of helping players file complaints against online casinos and retrieving unpaid funds. Since its launch, it has recovered more than $70m in unpaid or delayed funds to players.

In April 2016, the media company Catena Media acquired AskGamblers for €15 million. In January 2023, AskGamblers was acquired by Gaming Innovation Group for €45 million.

=== World Sports Network (WSN.com) ===
Through its sports website, WSN.com, Gaming Innovation Group entered the regulated US sports betting market in January 2019. It was first granted a license to operate in New Jersey, followed by Indiana, Pennsylvania, Colorado and West Virginia. In June 2020, WSN.com started an online gambling podcast with sports betting personality Bill Krackomberger.

=== CasinoTopsOnline ===
GiG acquired Casinotopsonline.com in March 2017 for the amount of €11.5 million, at the time it was deemed as one of Europe's largest online casino review portals. The site focuses on news and casino reviews operating on a worldwide scale.

=== Time2play.com ===
In December 2023, Time2play.com and the company Time2Play Media was acquired by Gentoo Media. The site features data-driven reviews, guides, news, and other information on online gambling. Previously known as KaFe Rocks, the company rebranded as Time2play Media in June 2023.

=== Casinomeister.com ===
In June 2024, Gentoo Media acquired Casinomeister.com, a longstanding online casino advocacy and review platform that has been operating since June 1998. The site features an active forum where online gamblers connect and exchange opinions. It also offers a complaints service that facilitates dispute resolution between players and operators.
