= Mark Blandford =

Mark Blandford may refer to:

- Mark Blandford (entrepreneur) (born 1957), English businessman, founder of Sportingbet plc
- Mark Harden Blandford (1826–1902), American soldier, attorney, politician and judge
