= NordicBet =

Online sportsbook and casino in Norway

- Type: Subsidiary
- Founded: 2002; 24 years ago in Norway
- Founder: Jan Svendsen; Harald Lervik; Øyvind Dahl; Espen Skoglund
- Area served: Sweden; Denmark; Norway; Finland; Iceland; Faroe Islands
- Products: Online casino and sportsbetting
- Parent: Betsson
- Website: nordicbet.com

NordicBet is an online sportsbook and casino founded in 2002 in Norway. It is a leading bookmaker in the Scandinavian countries and Finland with a focus on Nordic sports.

== History ==
NordicBet was founded in 2002 in Norway by Jan Svendsen, Harald Lervik, Øyvind Dahl and Espen Skoglund. By 2006, it was reported to have more than 120,000 customers and expected profit of NOK 75 million with each founder holding shares worth over NOK 100 million.

In 2012, it was acquired by the Swedish gambling giant Betsson for NOK 700 million. The deal was expected to strengthen Betsson's position as the largest private gambling company in the Nordics. After the acquisition, Betsson announced that NordicBet would focus exclusively on its key markets on Scandinavia with bets accepted only in Sweden, Finland, Denmark, Norway, Iceland and the Faroe Islands.

In 2018 it was one of the first companies to be granted a Swedish online gaming license ahead of the market's re-regulation in 2019.

It was announced in 2019 that NordicBet would end betting on electronic sports despite its increasing popularity with the company stating that "responsibility comes first," since their games were intended for adults while a large proportion of electronic sports players and fans were children. In 2022, NordicBet launched a revamped brand image that was developed in-house by Betsson.

== Sport sponsorships ==
After becoming part of Betsson, NordicBet took over title sponsorship responsibilities of the Danish Superliga and Danish 1st Division football leagues from its sister company Betsafe in 2013. The 1st Division deal was extended in 2023. In 2014, NordicBet added a sponsorship of Jockerit, a professional hockey team from Helsinki. It also became the exclusive betting partner of the newly created Champions Hockey League including sponsoring the MVP award. In 2016, NordicBet became the title sponsor of the Swedish Hockey League.

Ambassadors have included Finnish professional hockey players Leo Komarov and Norwegian model Linni Meister.
