= Gaming control board =

Type of government agency

A gaming control board (GCB), also called by various names including gambling control board, casino control board, gambling board, and gaming commission, is a government agency charged with regulating casino and other types of gaming in a defined geographical area, usually a state, and of enforcing gaming law in general.

== Rules and regulations ==
Gaming control boards are usually responsible for promulgating rules and regulations that dictate how gaming activities are to be conducted within a jurisdiction. The rules and regulations stem from the jurisdiction's enabling act. Generally, the enabling act is passed by the legislature and sets forth the broad policy of the jurisdiction with regard to gaming; while the rules and regulations provide detailed requirements that must be satisfied by a gaming establishment, its owners, employees, and vendors. Typically, rules and regulations cover a broad range of activity, including licensing, accounting systems, rules of casino games, fair play, better security and auditing.

=== Licensing ===
Gaming control boards also have complete authority to grant or deny licenses to gaming establishments, their ownership, employees, and vendors. Generally, in order to obtain a license, an applicant must demonstrate that they possess good character, honesty and integrity. License application forms typically require detailed personal information. Based upon the type of license being sought, an applicant may also be required to disclose details regarding previous business relationships, employment history, criminal records, and financial stability.

Generally, the gaming license application process and subsequent investigation is quite burdensome in comparison to the process of obtaining other government-issued licenses. The difficulty of the process is intended to dissuade participation by unsavory people and organized crime.

Recently, in order to simplify the application process, various gaming control boards have collaborated on the design of "multi-jurisdictional" application forms. Persons or vendors who are involved in gaming in multiple jurisdictions may now complete one application form and submit copies to each jurisdiction.

== Enforcement ==
In some cases, Gaming Control Boards are responsible for enforcing the rules and regulations that they create. In other cases, a separate body or a division of the Gaming Control Board carries out the enforcement function. Most Gaming Control Boards have full authority to hear and decide civil cases brought before them by the enforcement body and thus are considered quasi-judicial bodies.

== List of gaming control boards ==
=== Inter-regional associations ===
- Gaming Regulators European Forum (GREF)
- International Association of Gaming Regulators (IAGR)
- North American Gaming Regulators Association (NAGRA)

=== Regional and tribal associations ===
==== Asia ====
- Macau: Macau Gaming Inspection and Coordination Bureau
- Philippines: In general, gaming industry is regulated by Philippine Amusement and Gaming Corporation (PAGCOR), with the exception of:
  - Games and Amusements Board (GAB), which regulates horse betting; and
  - Philippine Charity Sweepstakes Office (PCSO), which operates lotteries.
- Singapore: Casino Regulatory Authority of Singapore

==== Europe ====
- Denmark: Spillemyndigheden
- France : Autorité Nationale des Jeux
- Gibraltar: Gibraltar Regulatory Authority
- Hungary: Gaming Board of Hungary
- Malta: Malta Gaming Authority
- Netherlands: Nederlandse Kansspelautoriteit
- Norway: Norwegian Gaming and Foundation Authority – part of Ministry of Culture and Equality
- Portugal: Inspectorate General on Gaming
- Slovenia: Office for Gaming Supervision
- Sweden: National Gaming Board
- United Kingdom: Gambling Commission
  - Alderney: Alderney Gambling Control Commission
  - Isle of Man: Isle of Man Gambling Supervision Commission

==== North America ====
===== Canada =====
In Canada, gambling is regulated exclusively by the provinces rather than federal law. Regulatory agencies include:

- Alberta Gaming, Liquor, and Cannabis Commission
- British Columbia Gaming Policy and Enforcement Branch
- Kahnawake Gaming Commission
- Nova Scotia Alcohol and Gaming Authority
- Alcohol and Gaming Commission of Ontario
- Quebec Régie des Alcools des Courses et des Jeux

===== United States =====
In the United States, gambling is legal under federal law, although there are significant restrictions pertaining to interstate and online gambling.

===== States =====
Individual states have the right to regulate or prohibit the practice within their borders. Regulatory agencies include:

- Arizona Department of Gaming
- California Gambling Control Commission
  - California Bureau of Gambling Control
- Colorado Division of Gaming
- Connecticut Division of Special Revenue
- Delaware Lottery
  - Delaware Division of Gaming Enforcement
- Illinois Gaming Board
- Indiana Gaming Commission
- Iowa Racing and Gaming Commission
- Kansas Racing and Gaming Commission
- Louisiana Gaming Control Board
- Maine Gambling Control Board
- Maryland Lottery (Controls both the lottery and the state's slot-machine program)
- Massachusetts Gaming Commission
- Michigan Gaming Control Board
- Minnesota Alcohol and Gambling Enforcement Division
- Mississippi Gaming Commission
- Missouri Gaming Commission
- Nevada Gaming Commission
  - Nevada Gaming Control Board
- New Jersey Casino Control Commission
  - New Jersey Division of Gaming Enforcement
- New Mexico Gaming Control Board
- New York State Gaming Commission
- Ohio Casino Control Commission
- Pennsylvania Gaming Control Board
- South Dakota Commission on Gaming
- Washington State Gambling Commission
- West Virginia Lottery Commission

===== Tribes =====
In the United States, some Native American tribal nations have established their own gaming control boards for the purpose of regulating tribe-owned casinos located within reservations. Although the tribal nation also owns the casino, appointing an independent gaming control board to oversee regulatory activities provides tribal members with assurances that the casino is operated within expected standards and that tribal revenue is accurately collected and reported. Native American casinos are subject to the provisions of the Indian Gaming Regulatory Act, which is enforced by the National Indian Gaming Commission (NIGC). The NIGC establishes minimum internal control standards and other requirements that each Native American gaming control board must follow. However, the NIGC does not have jurisdiction over state-regulated entities.

==== Oceania ====
- New South Wales, Australia: Gaming Tribunal of New South Wales
- Queensland, Australia: Queensland Office of Gaming Regulation/Queensland Gaming Commission
- Victoria (Australia): Victorian Commission for Gambling Regulation
- South Australia: South Australia Independent Gambling Authority

== United Kingdom ==
The Gambling Commission is an executive, non-departmental public body of the United Kingdom government, responsible for regulating gambling and overseeing gambling legislation in the UK. Its powers extend to gaming machines, totalizators, bingo, casinos, slot machines, and lotteries, as well as remote gambling, but not spread betting. Free prize competitions and sweepstakes are not subject to the Commission's control under the Gambling Act 2005.

The Commission's stated objectives are to prevent crime in gambling and protect the vulnerable. It issues licenses to operators and advises the government on gambling-related matters. It also collaborates with the police regarding suspected illegal gambling activities. The Commission replaced the United Kingdom Gambling Board in 2007. In 2013, it took on responsibility for regulating the National Lottery.

== Online gambling ==
Online gambling (also known as iGaming or iGambling) is any form of gambling conducted over the Internet. This includes virtual poker, casinos, and sports betting. Today, by various estimates, this market's volume amounts to about 40 billion dollars annually. The online gambling sector has undergone radical changes over the past two decades. This is a natural result of growing demand for convenience, security, and accessibility in gambling. Online casinos offer players a unique opportunity to play from anywhere in the world, at any time, and on any device — from smartphones to PCs. But behind the apparent simplicity of the virtual gaming world lies a powerful legal and technological foundation.

In many countries, online gambling is restricted or prohibited. However, it is legal in some US states, certain Canadian provinces, most European Union countries, and several Caribbean countries. In many legal markets, online gambling service providers are required by law to hold a specific type of license to provide services or advertise to residents. Examples of such authorities include the United Kingdom Gambling Commission or the Pennsylvania Gaming Control Board in the USA. Many online casinos and gambling companies worldwide prefer to be based in tax havens close to their primary markets. Such locations include Gibraltar, Malta, and Alderney in Europe. In Asia, online gambling is legal in the Philippines, where the regulatory body is the Philippine Amusement & Gaming Corporation or PAGCOR, while the Macau Special Administrative Region was long considered a tax haven and a well-known base for gambling operators in the region. However, in 2018, the EU removed Macau from its blacklist of tax havens.
