= SuperCasino (TV channel) =

British gambling television channel

- Country: United Kingdom
- Broadcast area: United Kingdom (except Northern Ireland)
- Network: Channel 5
- Affiliates: Jackpot247
- Headquarters: London, UK

Programming
- Language: English
- Picture format: 576i (SDTV 16:9)

Ownership
- Owner: NetPlayTV plc

History
- Launched: April 2005
- Closed: 2 March 2018
- Former names: Vegas 24/7; Live Roulette TV

Links
- Website: www.supercasino.com

Availability (at time of closure)

Streaming media
- SuperCasino.com: www.supercasino.com (UK only)

SuperCasino is a gambling television channel which aired on Channel 5, in the United Kingdom, from 2009 to 2018.

== Origin ==
SuperCasino launched in April 2005 as Vegas 24/7 Limited, onto Sky Channel 697, as the world's first interactive casino channel, The channel was founded by David Wainwright who subsequently became a pioneer in the live dealer space launching live studios for over 30 large operators. The company reversed into NetplayTV PLC and was listed on the London Stock Exchange, reaching a market cap of £80m. The company received investment from Playtech and was later acquired by Betsson PLC. The show was broadcast on UK national TV for over 10 years and became a regular late night destination for players seeking a second screen experience.

== Subsequent ownership ==
The channel was later owned by Betsson AB.

== Broadcasts ==
SuperCasino broadcast every night of the week on Channel 5. Its presentation was based on the game of roulette, in two variations, Live Roulette and Roulette Express. Live presenter-led programming was broadcast from 18:00 to 04:00 daily, supplemented by automated roulette from 04:00 to 18:00 on the Sky channel. Viewers could register and play along via their telephone, on the website or through their smartphone.

Super Casino was removed from Freeview channel 39 on 20 October 2009 and Freesat channel 851 on 28 July 2010. However, it was shown overnight on Channel 5 between 00:00 and 03:10 (from 01:00 on weekdays) until 1 January 2019, when it was replaced by Teleshopping. It was broadcast live from studios in London, with additional broadcast facilities in Guernsey, CI. It was removed from Sky channel 862 on 2 March 2016.

SuperCasino was the first casino operator to have a live TV roulette channel in the UK and used accredited roulette wheels in line with its e-gambling license.

SuperCasino was not available to those who live in Northern Ireland but unlike Jackpot247, it was available to those living on the Channel Islands.

== Live Roulette ==
Live Roulette was the name given to the presenter-led roulette offering. Every few minutes a roulette round was played, and viewers/players could watch the croupier spin the ball around the roulette wheel. As soon as the ball is in motion the table was closed for betting.

== Roulette Express Premium ==
During the hours of 4am-6pm when presenter/spinner led Live Roulette was not broadcast, there was a simpler Autowheel game, named Roulette Express Premium. An automated roulette wheel using jets of compressed air to move the ball automatically was used as the main gaming device, and each roulette round was shorter in duration than the presenter-led show.
