= Centrebet =

Australian bookmaker

- Company type: Private
- Industry: Gambling
- Founded: 1993
- Headquarters: Alice Springs, Australia
- Key people: Michael McRitchie (CEO); Peter Foot (Chief Bookmaker)
- Parent: BetEasy
- Website: www.centrebet.com

Centrebet was an Australian bookmaker licensed in the Northern Territory.

== History ==
Centrebet originated from Alice Springs, Northern Territory and was the first bookmaker to be licensed in Australia in 1993 and the first bookmaker to go online in the Southern Hemisphere. Centrebet was acquired by its biggest domestic rival, the SportOdds Group, in 2003 for the sum of $47 million. In 2005, SportOdds merged its Centrebet, SportOdds.com and SuperOdds.co.uk businesses into one entity, known as Centrebet. In 2006, the company was listed on the Australian Securities Exchange.

In May 2011, Centrebet entered a scheme of arrangement with Sportingbet and was delisted on 1 September 2011.

In 2017, the Centrebet brand was revived by William Hill Australia. In 2018, Centrebet was included in the merger of William Hill Australia with CrownBet to form BetEasy.
