= Gibraltar Betting and Gaming Association =

Gibraltar Betting and Gaming Association is a trade association representing online gambling businesses with remote gambling licences issued in Gibraltar.

== Members ==
The GBGA is funded by its members, and the majority of remote gambling licence holders holding licences issued by the Gibraltar Gambling Commissioner are members. Members include household names in the gambling industry such as Bet365, Betfair, Ladbrokes and William Hill.

== Purpose ==
The GBGA's purpose is to speak on behalf of the Gibraltar remote gambling licencees on matters of legal and regulatory importance to the gambling industry, when engaging in dialogue with relevant authorities around the world. It also aims to provide governments, legislators and policy makers with a better understanding of the gambling industry and its importance to Gibraltar. The GBGA has operated since January 2005, however in April 2013 it was incorporated into corporate form.

Peter Howitt, was appointed Chief Executive of the GBGA in May 2013. Peter is the founder of Ramparts, a law firm in Gibraltar. The GBGA also receives consultancy advice from Sir Peter Caruana, the ex Chief Minister of Gibraltar.

== Activity ==
The GBGA stated in 2013 that it may seek a judicial review of what became the Gambling (Licensing & Advertising) Act 2014 on the basis that it breaches EU law. The Act includes the introduction of a UK licensing regime and a tax on gambling of 15% in the UK (point of consumption tax). The changes to tax legislation are anticipated to raise over £300 million in UK tax revenues.

Peter Howitt attended a session at UK Parliament to give oral evidence regarding the proposal, heard by MPs including Helen Grant the Minister for the Department for Digital, Culture, Media and Sport.

In November 2013 the GBGA set out its proposals for an alternative passporting regime whereby gambling companies holding remote gambling licences from reputable jurisdictions could rely on their existing licence to operate in the UK without having to obtain a separate UK Gambling Commission Licence. The proposals can be found at UK Parliament Publications

On 18 June 2014 the GBGA wrote to both the UK Government and UK Gambling Commission putting them on notice of a claim for judicial review of the Gambling (Licensing and Advertising) Act 2014 on the basis that the Act is 'unlawful' and 'unworkable'.

The GBGA has an affiliate partnership with the European Betting and Gaming Association (EGBA), and is the first national member of the EGBA. This partnership is intended to enable both associations to more effectively consult at EU level on matters of importance to the gambling industry, such as anti-money laundering legislation.
