= Jenny Watson (civil servant) =

Chair of the UK Electoral Commission (born 1964)

Jennifer Watson CBE (born 25 January 1964), better known as Jenny Watson, is the former chairperson of the United Kingdom Electoral Commission. She is Chair of the House of St Barnabas, of GamStop and of Mossbourne Parkside Academy, a Hackney primary school, part of the Mossbourne Federation. She is also Chair of the Independent Complaints Panel at the Portman Group, the UK alcohol regulator, overseeing complaints into the naming, packaging, promotion and sponsorship of alcoholic drinks in the UK. She is a non-executive director at the Financial Reporting Council, the Financial Ombudsman Service, and the Reclaim Fund.

Watson was the last chair of the Equal Opportunities Commission before the creation of the Commission for Equality and Human Rights, having been first appointed as a commissioner in 1999, and deputy chair from 2000. She was deputy chairman of the Banking Code Standards Board, and of the Committee on Radioactive Waste Management. A long term campaigner for women's rights, she had a 20+ year career in the not for profit sector. She started out at Liberty, and then political campaigners Charter88, before moving to Victim Support. She is a former Chair of the Fawcett Society, a not-for-profit organisation campaigning for equality between women and men.

Watson was appointed the second chair of the Electoral Commission in January 2009. She was paid £100,000 for a role which required her to work three days a week. Watson remained chair of the electoral commission amidst criticism of her management of the 2010 United Kingdom general election, when she defended herself on the grounds that the Electoral Commission had few powers over returning officers. Since then, the Parliamentary Voting System and Constituencies Act 2011 has increased the commission's authority with regard to referendums. She formally announced the results of the Welsh devolution referendum "in both English and Welsh with perfect pronunciation". Just two months later, she acted as Chief Counting Officer (CCO) in the 2011 AV Referendum and also acted in the same capacity in the 2016 EU Referendum. In doing so, she became the first person to oversee two UK-wide referendums as Chief Counting Officer.

Watson was appointed Commander of the Order of the British Empire (CBE) in the 2017 Birthday Honours for services to electoral democracy.

== Publications ==
- Human Rights in Britain since the Human Rights Act 1998: A Critical Review co-authored with Alice Donald (Global Partners & Associates) and the Human Rights & Social Justice Research Unit of London Metropolitan University.

Government offices
Preceded by Julie Mellor	Chair of the Equal Opportunities Commission; 2005–2007	Succeeded by Position abolished
Preceded by Sam Younger	Chair of the Electoral Commission; 2008–present	Incumbent
