= Self-exclusion =

Limitation to prevent problem gambling

Self-exclusion (or voluntary exclusion) is a policy enacted by some governments and individual casinos to address problem gambling. Both land based casinos and online casinos can offer self-exclusion programs.

In areas that have enacted self-exclusion policies, an individual who is aware that they suffer from a gambling problem can voluntarily request that their name be added to the self-exclusion list. If their application is accepted, the person in question becomes legally banned from all participating gambling premises within the self-exclusion coverage area. If a person who has been added to the self-exclusion list enters or attempts to enter a gambling premise that participates in the self-exclusion program, they can be arrested and charged with trespassing. In addition, any chips, tokens, credits or other winnings in their possession at the time of arrest can be confiscated or invalidated. The participant must complete the form voluntarily.

There is also self-exclusion as a responsible gambling tool for online gambling, with 85.63% of casinos offering it, for example.

Often gambling operators are required as a condition of licence to participate in a multi-operator self-exclusion scheme, as well as being required to enable their customers to exclude themselves with them directly.

Self-exclusion programs are available in the United States, the United Kingdom, Canada, Australia, South Africa, and other countries.

== The need for self-exclusion ==
With both online sports betting and online casinos being legalized in more and more U.S. states, gambling is increasingly prevalent across the United States of America. For many, increased access to gambling can lead to problematic behaviors, and, in some cases, the development of gambling disorder.

Only about one in ten problem gamblers seeks treatment, amplifying the importance that effective treatments programs are available to those who seek help. Self-exclusion programs are a critical tool for many struggling with problematic gambling behaviors. However, it is important to acknowledge the limited information currently available on the efficacy of self exclusion to all of the varying demographics of problem gamblers. Dozens of gambling self-exclusion programs are currently across the United States, operated by both state governments and betting operators such as online sportsbooks and online casinos.

== Effectiveness ==
Gambling self-exclusion programs seem to help some (but not all) problem gamblers to gamble less often.

Some experts maintain that casinos, in general, arrange for self-exclusion programs as a public relations measure without actually helping many of those with gambling problems. A campaign of this type merely "deflects attention away from problematic products and industries," according to Natasha Dow Schull, a cultural anthropologist at New York University and author of the book Addiction by Design, who was interviewed for The Fifth Estate in Canada. Other experts believe that self-enforcement is part of the problem gambling addict's own responsibility, as one aspect of any therapy program. "Without such acceptance of responsibility, much of the effectiveness of self-exclusion programs would be lost", as one explained.

There is also a question as to the effectiveness of such programs, which can be difficult to enforce. In the province of Ontario, Canada, for example, the Self-Exclusion program operated by the government's Ontario Lottery and Gaming Corporation (OLG) is not effective, according to investigation conducted by the television series, revealed in late 2017. "Gambling addicts ... said that while on the ... self-exclusion list, they entered OLG properties on a regular basis" in spite of the facial recognition technology in place at the casinos, according to the Canadian Broadcasting Corporation. A CBC journalist who tested the system found that he was able to enter Ontario casinos and gamble on four distinct occasions, in spite of having been registered and photographed for the self-exclusion program. Reminding viewers that the problem gambler must accept some responsibility after requesting self-enforcement, an OLG spokesman provided this response when questioned by the CBC: "We provide supports to self-excluders by training our staff, by providing disincentives, by providing facial recognition, by providing our security officers to look for players. No one element is going to be foolproof because it is not designed to be foolproof". As OLG literature confirms, the enforcement by a casino cannot be expected to be 100% foolproof. "If you attempt to re-enter a gaming facility in Ontario, your image may be captured by cameras and you may be automatically detected by security." A 2019 UK investigation showed the limits of self-exclusion schemes when it was reported that players could circumvent exclusion by simply changing their email address, or by changing a letter in their names. The UKGC suggest a multi-layered solution to the problem.

== GamStop ==
GamStop is a free online self-exclusion scheme in Britain designed to help people with gambling problems by restricting their access to online betting sites. From its launch in 2018, GamStop allows individuals to voluntarily ban themselves from all gambling websites and apps licensed in Britain with a single request, instead of having to self-exclude at each operator one by one.

The UK Gambling Commission made participation in GamStop mandatory for all online gambling operators in March 2020, integrating the scheme into the national gambling regulatory framework.

The Association of British Bookmakers cited a survey in which 83% of GamStop's users said that it had reduced or stopped their gambling, and 71% said that they had stopped using their nominated betting sites since joining the scheme. A 2019 investigation by the BBC found that a gambler who self-referred was still able to gamble by changing their user details, such as misspelling their surname.

In early 2026, Gamstop reported a 40% increase in self-exclusion requests from gamblers aged 16-24 in the second half of 2025.

== Liquor self-exclusion ==
The term "self-exclusion" usually refers to voluntary exclusion from gambling venues. Yet many businesses which sell or serve alcohol also allow patrons to make informal requests for self-exclusion. In some places, standardized liquor self-exclusion request forms are available online, and businesses are legally required to honor valid self-exclusion requests.

== See also ==
- Gamblers Anonymous
