= Equal Opportunities Commission (United Kingdom) =

Equal Opportunities Commission logo

The Equal Opportunities Commission (EOC) was a QUANGO which was once governed by the Home Office in the United Kingdom which tackled sex discrimination and promoted gender equality. Its last chair was Jenny Watson.

It was set up under the Sex Discrimination Act 1975 and had statutory powers to help enforce this Act, the Equal Pay Act and other gender equality legislation that existed in Britain. Due to the ability of the Scottish Parliament and Welsh Assembly to vary the law in this area, separate EOC sub-agencies existed for Scotland and Wales. The EOC did not cover Northern Ireland, where instead these matters were dealt with by the Equality Commission for Northern Ireland.

Similar agencies existed for other categories of equality law in England, Scotland, and Wales. In October 2007, these all became part of a new single equality body, the Equality, and Human Rights Commission.

== See also ==
- Commission for Racial Equality
- Disability Rights Commission
