= Alcohol and Gaming Authority =

Government body in Nova Scotia, Canada

The Alcohol and Gaming Authority (AGA, previously known as the Nova Scotia Gaming Control Commission) is an agency of the government of the Canadian province of Nova Scotia that regulates gambling and alcoholic beverages in the province.

Upon its establishment on April 4, 1995, the Authority assumed the functions of both the Nova Scotia Liquor License Board (in administration, inspection and licensing) and the duties of the Nova Scotia Lottery Commission and the Nova Scotia Amusements Regulation Board. The merger was finalized in an Order in Council dated July 15, 1997.

The Authority's responsibilities include two broad mandates under the Gaming Control Act. The first is to license and regulate gaming activity in Nova Scotia; the second is to study and report on certain aspects of gaming in Nova Scotia. These mandates necessarily include a strong consumer protection focus. The areas of study set forth in the Act include public interest and reaction to various forms of gaming; social, economic, health, justice, and environmental impacts of gaming; and the study of gaming laws and activities in other jurisdictions.

The Alcohol and Gaming Authority is a separate and distinct entity from the Nova Scotia Gaming Corporation, and the two agencies have differing functions.

The Authority is a licensing authority for gaming, and also regulates gaming activity for which licenses have been issued. The Authority's mandate pursuant to the Theatres and Amusements Act includes film classification, licensing, and regulation. Film classification duties involve the viewing and subsequent classification of film products for use in Nova Scotia. Licensing duties involve the licensing and regulation of theatres, places of amusement, and events where fees are charged to the public.

== See also ==
- Gaming Control Board
