= Sam Younger =

British media and charity manager (born 1951)

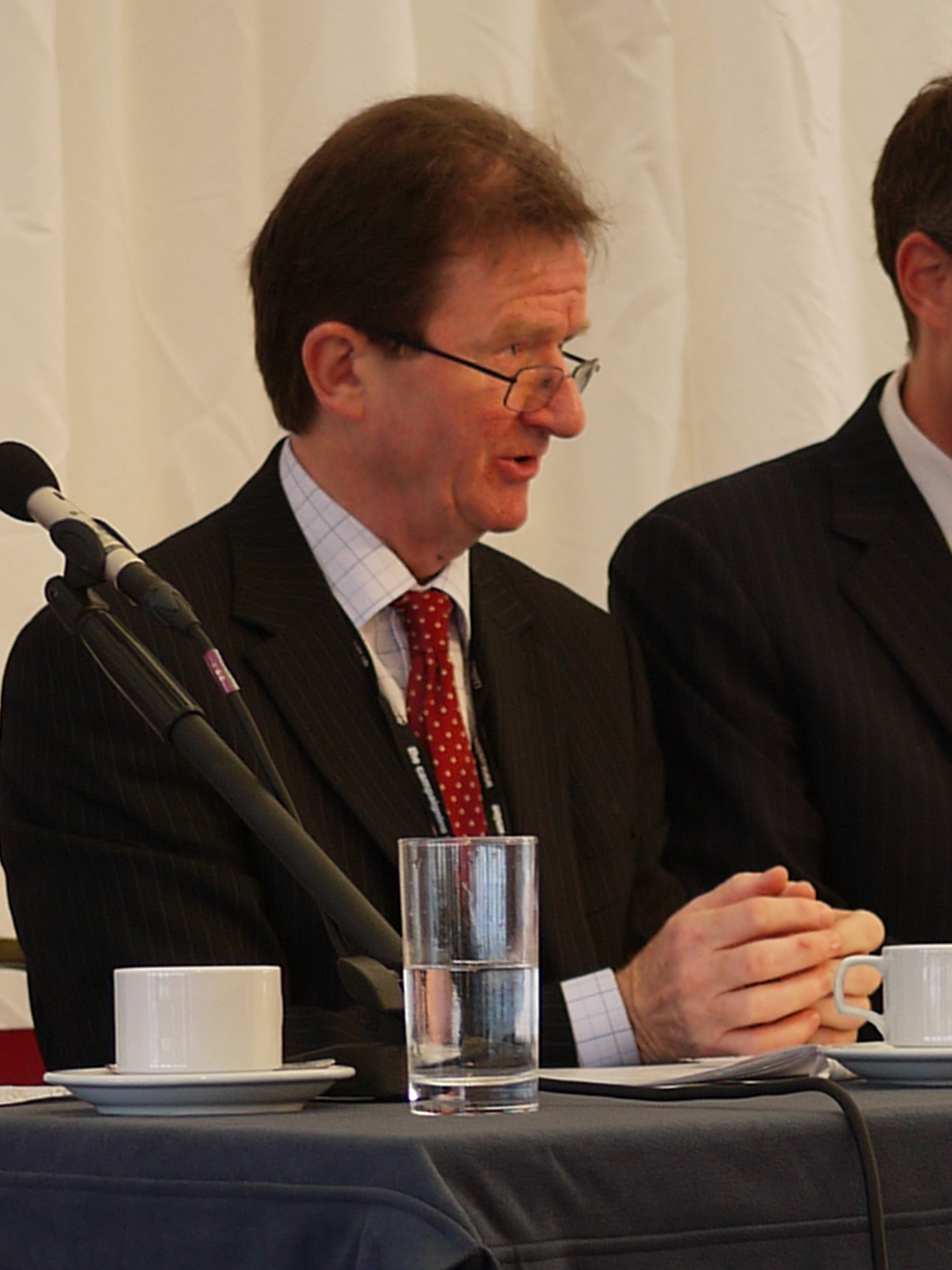
Sam Younger in 2011

James Samuel Younger CBE (born 5 October 1951) is a British media and charity manager.

Younger was managing director of the BBC World Service from 1994 to 1998, and chief executive of the British Red Cross from 1999 to 2001. He was the founding chairman of the United Kingdom Electoral Commission from 2001 to 2008 and the chief executive of the Charity Commission for England and Wales from September 2010 to April 2014.

He is also chair of the governing body of the University of Sussex and former chairman of the Board of QAA.

He was appointed Commander of the Order of the British Empire (CBE) in the 2009 New Year Honours.

He has been chairman of the Consumers' Association Council since 1 January 2020.

Younger is the son of Kenneth Younger, a Labour Minister under Clement Attlee.

Media offices
Preceded by John Tusa; 1986–1993	Director, BBC World Service; 1993–1998	Succeeded by Mark Byford; 1998–2001
Non-profit organization positions
Preceded by Mike Whitlam	Chief Executive of the British Red Cross; 1999–2001	Succeeded by Sir Nick Young
Government offices
Preceded by New position	Chair of the Electoral Commission; 2001–2008	Succeeded by Jenny Watson
Preceded by Andrew Hind	Chief Executive of the Charity Commission for England and Wales; 2010–2014	Succeeded by Paula Sussex
