= Gaming Innovation Group =

Online gambling company

- logo of the company
- Formerly: Donkr International Ltd. (2008-2012)
- Type: Public company
- Traded as: OSE: GIG; Nasdaq Stockholm: GIGSEK
- ISIN: US4593781051
- Industry: Online gambling, B2B, sports betting
- Founded: 2008; 18 years ago
- Founder: Robin Reed and Frode Fagerli
- Headquarters: Malta
- Number of locations: Malta, Marbella, Madrid, Barcelona, Toulouse
- Area served: Worldwide
- Key people: Richard Carter; James Coxon; Phil Richards; Kevin Norville; Claudio Caruana
- Products: CoreX; SportX; LogicX; GiG Magic; GiG Wand; SweepX; DataX
- Revenue: ▲€44.1 million (2019)
- Operating income: ▼€24.1 million (2019)
- Net income: ▼€64.7 million (2019)
- Total assets: ▲€135.1 million (2019)
- Total equity: ▲€20.9 million (2017)
- Number of employees: 600 (2019)
- Subsidiaries: iGamingCloud Ltd.

Gaming Innovation Group. (usually styled GiG) is an iGaming company offering iGaming platform, sportsbook and AI services to its B2B partners. The company is listed on the Nasdaq First North Growth Market under the ticker symbol "GIG SBD".

GiG is a full-service iGaming software services provider for online gambling operators and has progressively expanded into most segments of the supplier value chain in iGaming: Software platform services (GiG Core), formerly known as iGaming Cloud, and sportsbook (GiG Sports and the 2022 acquisition of Sportnco).

The company has previously operated several consumer brands, including Rizk.com and Guts.com, before divesting them to Betsson in April 2020. The company's platform of services is licensed by the MGA, UKGC and offered under a TW issued by the DGE in New Jersey. It is certified in Sweden, Spain, Iowa (USA), Croatia and Latvia, and is also compliant with GLI33 and GLI16 platform standards and ISO27001 for GiG Core and GiG Data.

== History ==
=== Early years and 2010s ===
Gaming Innovation Group Ltd. was initially incorporated in 2008 as Donkr International Ltd. in Malta.

In 2012, Guts Gaming Ltd. (now MT SecureTrade Limited) was incorporated as a fully owned Gaming Innovation Group Ltd subsidiary. In May 2013, the company launched Guts.com, a website offering sports betting and casino games.

In early 2015, iGamingCloud Ltd., a B2B platform service for the iGaming industry, was launched (GiG Core). The product went live in February 2015. In the same month, Gaming Innovation Group and Nio Inc. signed iGaming Cloud and sportsbook (GiG Sports) supported by GiG's fully managed services.

In May 2015, Optimizer Invest acquired 10% of iGaming Cloud Ltd for consideration of €1m. In addition, there was a Share Exchange Agreement to exchange the entire issued share capital of Gaming Innovation Group PLC. for shares in Nio Inc. Subsequently, Nio inc. adopted the name of Gaming Innovation Group Inc. and appointed Robin Reed as its new CEO. The month after, Gaming Innovation Group was listed on the Oslo Stock Exchange.

The company expanded into the affiliate industry in iGaming by a series of acquisitions. GiG subsidiary Innovation Labs (GiG Media) acquired affiliate network Spaseeba for 27m GiG shares. GiG Media also acquired affiliate networks in respectively Finland and Estonia.

In January 2016 the company launched the B2C casino brand Rizk.com. Later on in March, the company acquired the sports betting company OddsModel AS for consideration of 21.74 million new Shares. In June 2016 Gaming Innovation Group acquired Betit Holdings adding the three iGaming operators Kaboo.com, SuperLenny.com, and Thrills.com to its portfolio of B2C focused brands (notably Rizk.com and Guts.com before the Betit acquisition). As part of the deal, Optimizer Invest increased its ownership of GiG shares. The company also continued its expansion within the media business by acquiring Dutch affiliate network Delta Markets B.V. as well as Swedish affiliate network Magenti Media.

In 2017, GiG acquired the technology-driven performance marketing company Rebel Penguin ApS for a total amount of €13 million. This acquisition concluded GiG Media being established as a multi-channel affiliate, operating both a publishing unit (organic rankings on search engines) as well as a paid marketing unit. A new B2C brand called Highroller was also launched.

2018 was the signing of a deal with Hard Rock Casino, with an initial launch in Atlantic City, New Jersey. The company also launched its marketing compliance tool targeted at the online gambling segment, GiG Comply. An in-house sportsbook on Rizk.com was launched just ahead of the 2018 FIFA World Cup. During the year of 2018, GiG obtained a betting license in the German state Schleswig-Holstein, part of the DACH region.

In January 2019, GiG launched the Hard Rock omnichannel in New Jersey. On 26 March 2019, the company began trading on the Nasdaq Stockholm under the ticker symbol 'GIGSEK'. In August 2019, Gaming Innovation Group sold its HighRoller brand to Ellmount Gaming, stating that their core focus will be primarily on growing Rizk as a casino brand and Guts as a sports betting brand. The HighRoller brand was sold for approx. €7m (3.5 PV).

During the year of 2019, Kindred Group was signed on the new GiG Comply product. The company also partnered with Skycity, a market leader in New Zealand, for its online casino platform. In September 2019, GiG launched its digital and retail sportsbook with Hard Rock Cafe International in Iowa.

=== 2020s ===
In April 2020, Gaming Innovation Group divested its B2C operations to Betsson, for a total of €31m with a premium fee on the platform service. From this point onwards, the intention is to be a purely B2B company, focused on its platform services (GiG Core) as well as its media/affiliate services (GiG Media).

In July 2020, GiG subsidiary iGaming Cloud Inc. was granted a permanent casino service industry enterprise license (CSIE) from the Division of Gaming Enforcement (DGE) in New Jersey, United States. The application was filed in June 2018 with GiG supporting Hard Rock International's casino operations in New Jersey under a so-called transactional waiver until the final approval was awarded.

In July 2020, GiG signed a long-term agreement with Mill of Magic Ltd, a subsidiary of Casumo, to supply its platform, data platform and GiG Logic for a Pay N Play casino brand licensed by the Malta Gaming Authority.

In February 2021, the company signed a long-term agreement with PlayStar Casino to enter New Jersey. That year, GiG obtained ISO 27001:2021 certification for the Frontend development solution and content management system, covering development, network configuration, infrastructure and associated product operations for frontend, middleware and backend Gaming services hosted on GiG's infrastructure. In May, the company completed a successful placement of a SEK 450 million senior secured bond, extending its total borrowing limit. The transaction was oversubscribed and received strong demand from investors across the Nordics, continental Europe, and the US, with participation in the placement from existing and new investors. In June, PlayStar Casino agreement was extended to cover the burgeoning Pennsylvanian market. In December, the company signed a long-term agreement to provide the Platform with Rank Holdings for their Marina888 brand. A share purchase agreement was announced to purchase Sportnco, a specialist in online sports betting.

=== Present day ===
In April 2022, GiG signed an agreement with Betway to provide Sportnco's sportsbook and player account management in Portugal. The same month, Sportnco acquisition is completed in a €51.5 deal. GiG Media won the iGB Affiliate award for Casino affiliate of the year at the 2022 event in London. In May 2022, the company signed an agreement with Full Games SA to provide player management and sports betting services in Angola, a new regulated market.

In January 2024, ahead of the ICE London trade show, GiG launched its next-generation platform CoreX and sportsbook SportX, together with the AI-driven products DataX and LogicX as part of a new "X-Suite" product range. The legal split of the group's media and platform businesses was completed on 30 September 2024, with the platform business continuing as GiG Software plc and the media business becoming the independently listed Gentoo Media Inc. GiG Software's shares began trading on the Nasdaq First North Premier Growth Market under the ticker "GIG SDB" on 1 October 2024. Following the restructuring, the company identified Finland, Brazil, France and New Zealand as priority markets for commercial growth, with Brazil's federally regulated online betting market opening to licensed operators on 1 January 2025.

== Organizational structure ==
GiG Software plc. (GIG) is a publicly traded corporation.

GIG is a holding company, with all commercial activities being carried out by its subsidiaries. GIG has subsidiaries located in Malta, Denmark, Gibraltar and Spain. Some of the subsidiaries based in Malta hold remote operator licences in the UK, Malta and Sweden. Furthermore, the two main segments of the business (GIG Media and GIG Core) are operated as follows: GIG Media is operated through Innovation Labs Ltd (a Malta-based subsidiary) and iGamingCloud Inc. (a US based subsidiary), and GIG Core is mainly operated through iGamingCloud Limited (a Malta-based subsidiary).

== Business units ==
Gaming Innovation Group operates units both focusing on the B2B Business-to-business market in iGaming. The company develops digital products and offers managed services to online and land-based gaming companies. Focused on Casino and Sports, products include Player Account Management, Frontend, CMS, Data, Sports and Managed Services. It is licensed in Malta, UK, New Jersey (USA), Spain and Sweden.

The media division (GiG Media) spun out as an independent company, forming Gentoo Media in September 2024. Since the split, GiG Software plc has operated as a single-segment B2B platform business, with the affiliate marketing division no longer part of its organizational structure.

== Controversies ==
GiG subsidiaries Betit Operations Ltd and MT SecureTrade were ordered to pay £1.4 million and £700,000 by the UK Gambling Commission for anti money laundering and social responsibility failings. GiG's chief executive said each subsidiary had acknowledged prior weaknesses in its controls and had invested in automated anti-money-laundering technology following the settlement.

== Sportnco ==
In April 2022, GiG announced the completion of a €51.5m acquisition of online sports betting provider Sportnco to complement both companies existing commercial profiles and offer significantly increased capacity for expansion into short- and long-term addressable markets. The deal was structured as €27.87 million in cash and €23.50 million in new GiG shares, with the cash portion financed largely through a €25 million directed share issue to SkyCity agreed in December 2021.

Sportnco currently has around 40 partners working in 12 countries across Europe and Latin America and is currently being launched in new regions in North America. It has offices in Madrid, Toulouse and Barcelona, and currently employs around 130 people.

Sportnco started in 2008 in the world of online sports betting for regulated markets, starting in France and then coming to Spain. The company developed its own betting platform, covering more than 50 sports. It currently operates B2B betting networks in Spain and France, and is active in other European jurisdictions like Portugal, Belgium and Greece, as well as in South America and the United States. Since its launch, the company has operated only in regulated markets.

== Licences and certificates ==
| Jurisdiction | License/Certificate | Type and purpose | Regulatory Body | Refs |
|---|---|---|---|---|
| UK | Combined Remote Operating License | A license to manufacture, supply, install or adapt gambling software; to operate a casino; to provide facilities for real event betting other than pool betting or betting on virtual events | UK Gambling Commission | |
| Malta | Corporate Group Critical Gaming Supply Licence | A licence to provide a supply in a business-to-business capacity | Malta Gaming Authority | |
| Sweden | Licence for online gaming and betting | A licence to provide commercial online games | Swedish Gambling Authority | |
| Romania | Class II Affiliate Licence | Second Class Licence for carrying out the activity of affiliated persons | Romanian Government National Gambling Office | |
| New Jersey, USA | Vendor Registration | Vendor Registration enabling affiliate marketing services in the state of New Jersey, USA | Division of Gaming Enforcement | |
| New Jersey, USA | Casino Service Industry Enterprise | A licence that enables the provision of an internet gaming and sports betting platform service | Division of Gaming Enforcement | |
| Colorado, USA | Vendor Minor Sports Betting Licence | A licence that enables affiliate marketing services in the state of Colorado, USA. | Colorado Limited Gaming Control Commission | |
| Indiana, USA | Sports Wagering Registrant Certificate of Registration | Vendor Registration enabling affiliate marketing services in the state of Indiana, USA. | Indiana Gaming Commission | |
| Pennsylvania, USA | Gaming Service Provider Registration | Vendor Registration enabling affiliate marketing services in the state of Pennsylvania, USA. | Pennsylvania Gaming Control Board | |
| West Virginia, USA | Sports Wagering Supplier - Interim Licence | A licence that enables affiliate marketing in the state of West Virginia, USA. | West Virginia Lottery Commission | |
| Tennessee, USA | Vendor Registration - Sports Gaming | Affiliate Vendor Registration enabling affiliate marketing services, in the state of Tennessee, USA. | Sports Wagering Committee of the Tennessee Education Lottery Corporation | |
| Global | ISO27001 - Certificate of Registration | Certification of compliance with the requirements of ISO 27001:2013 | Issued by ACM-CCAS Limited (accredited by the United Kingdom Accreditation Services) | |
| Sweden | GLI 16 GLI 33 | GIG Core has been audited and certified by GLI Europe B.V., on the basis of GLI 16 and GLI 33 standards. | GLI Europe B.V. | |

GiG's software platform has been certified in Latvia, Croatia, Spain, Sweden and Iowa. By virtue of partnerships GiG has entered into with operators, GiG provides its software platform services in these regulated markets.

== Financial data ==
| Year | Revenue (MEUR) | EBITDA (MEUR) | Source |
|---|---|---|---|
| 2025 | 37.6 | 4.3 | |
| 2024 | 31.8 | -3.0 | |
| 2023 | 37.8 | 11.1 | |
| 2019 | 123 | 14.1 | |
| 2018 | 151.4 | 16.1 | |
| 2017 | 120.4 | 12.5 | |
| 2016 | 53.6 | 5.8 | |
| 2015 | 17.8 | -2.1 | |

Figures for 2015-2019 reflect the consolidated group, including the B2C casino and sportsbook brands divested to Betsson in 2020. Figures from 2023 onwards reflect the B2B platform business only, following the 2020 B2C divestment and the 2024 spin-off of the GiG Media affiliate business as Gentoo Media.

== See also ==
- List of companies listed on the Oslo Stock Exchange
