= Sky Betting & Gaming =

British-based gambling company

Bonne Terre Limited
- Type: Limited company
- Industry: Online gambling and gaming
- Headquarters: Leeds
- Products: Sports betting, online poker, online casino, online bingo, odds comparison service, fantasy football and football predictor game
- Owner: Flutter Entertainment

Bonne Terre Limited (trading as Sky Betting & Gaming) is a British-based gambling company, owned by Flutter Entertainment, with headquarters in Leeds, West Yorkshire and offices in Solihull. Sky Betting & Gaming consists of five core brands: Sky Bet, Sky Vegas, Sky Casino, Sky Poker and Sky Bingo.

In 2015, Sky plc sold about 80 per cent stake in the company to CVC Capital Partners for £600 million, with Sky retaining a 20% stake in the company and agreeing to a long-term licence of the Sky brand. In 2018, CVC and Sky (then in the process of being acquired by Comcast) agreed to sell Sky Betting & Gaming to The Stars Group for £3.4 billion, which was then acquired by Flutter Entertainment in 2020.

Flutter Entertainment continues to use the Sky name and logo under licence from Sky Limited.

== Sky Bet ==
Sky Bet logo used since September 2020

Sky Bet is the sports betting division of Sky Betting & Gaming, with the majority of its operations run from Leeds.

=== History ===
Sky Bet's origins lie in BSkyB's acquisition of Sports Internet Group in July 2000, which included the small telephone and online sports betting-based company Surrey Sports, alongside two other companies: Planet Football and Opta Index. Surrey Sports was rebranded in July 2002 to create Sky Bet. The company grew in December 2006 when established online betting companies Total Bet and UK Betting were consolidated into Sky Bet after BSkyB's purchase of 365 Media Group.

== Sky Vegas ==
Sky Vegas logo used since September 2020

Sky Vegas is the company's primary online casino division.

Sky Vegas is licensed and regulated by the Alderney Gambling Control Commission (AGCC) (GCB).

Until 12 April 2011, Sky Vegas had a dedicated TV channel of the same name on Sky channel 864 (which was formerly called 'Sky Vegas Live'), when it was rebranded for Sky Bet.

=== History ===
'Sky Bet Vegas' was created in March 2003, initially with only 3 fixed odds casino-style games called 'Juicy Jackpot', 'Top Spin' and 'Super Keno'.

== Fines and regulatory sanctions ==
On 9 March 2022, the United Kingdom Gambling Commission (UKGC) fined Bonne Terre Limited, trading as Sky Betting and Gaming, £1.17m for breaching the Social Responsibility Code of Practice (SRCP 3.5.3(2) and SRCP 5.1.11) and a licensing condition according to section 82(1) of the Gambling Act 2005. The regulator carried out an investigation that found that on 2 November 2021, the operator sent out a promotional email for its Sky Vegas brand to 41,395 players who had self-excluded and 249,159 customers who had opted out of email marketing. The Commission notes that the licensee took immediate remedial reaction and that they had cooperated throughout the investigation.

After a complaint by the group Clean Up Gambling, in 2024, Sky Betting & Gaming was reprimanded by the UK Information Commissioner's Office for unlawful use of advertising cookies. In 2025, a high court judge in Britain found that Sky Betting & Gaming had improperly used customers data, and had improperly targeted marketing at a customer with a gambling addiction. Flutter said it was considering an appeal.
