= Nick Young (charity executive) =

British charity worker and solicitor (born 1952)

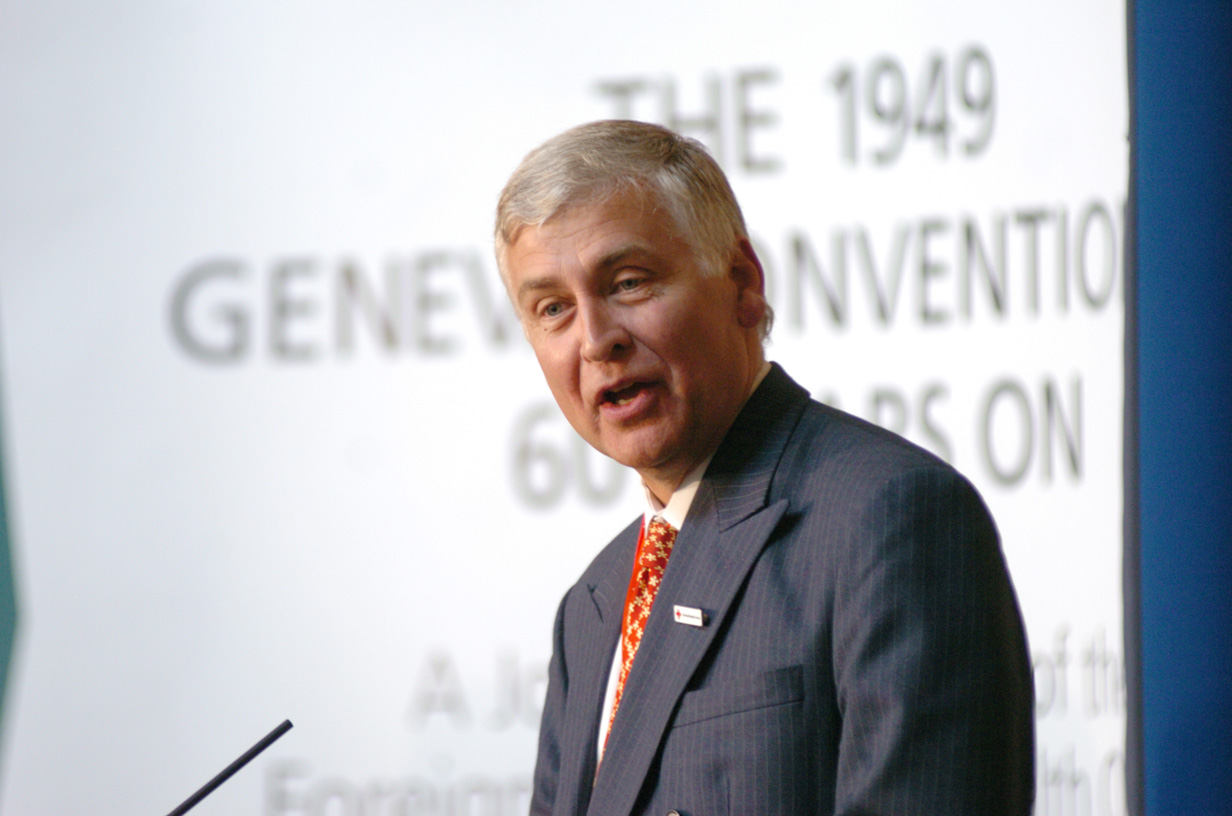
Sir Nick Young in 2009

Sir Nicholas Charles Young (born 16 April 1952) is a British charity worker and solicitor. He was chief executive of Macmillan Cancer Relief [now Macmillan Cancer Support] between 1995 and 2001, and chief executive of the British Red Cross from 2001 to 2014. He is married, with three sons.

== Early life ==
Young was born on 16 April 1952, to Major Leslie Young who had escaped from the Fontanellato Italian prisoner-of-war camp during World War II. He was educated at Wimbledon College, then a grammar school. He went on to study Law at the University of Birmingham, graduating with an upper second-class Bachelor of Laws (LLB) in 1974.

== Career ==
Between 1975 and 1978, Young worked as an articled clerk and solicitor at Freshfields. After a period of travelling, he joined the law firm Turner, Martin & Symes in Ipswich in 1979, becoming a partner of the practice in 1981.

In 1985, he left law for the charity sector, becoming secretary for development at the Sue Ryder Foundation. Between 1990 and 1995, he was Director of UK Operations for the British Red Cross. From 1995 to 2001, he was chief executive of Macmillan Cancer Relief. In July 2001, he returned to the British Red Cross to become its chief executive. He stepped down from the role in June 2014 following the death of one of his sons, Alex. He remains an honorary vice-president.

In addition to his career in the charity sector, he has held at various times a number of non-executive positions, including being a member of the NHS Modernisation Board, the Foreign Secretary's Human Rights Advisory Group, the National Honours Committee, and the Third Sector Advisory Body.

Currently [2021], he is chair of the Monte San Martino Trust and the Asian Women of Achievement Awards, and a trustee of the Wimbledon Foundation, and Hostage International. He is also a member of the NCO Advisory Board, the Humanitarian Memorial Committee, Freshfields Responsible Business Board, and a Patron of the Escape Lines Memorial Society.

In 2019, his book Escaping with his Life, about his father's wartime adventures, was published by Pen&Sword.

== Honours ==
In the Queen's Birthday Honours of 2000, he was knighted 'for services to cancer care'. He was made a Freeman of the City of London in 2007. In 2013, he was awarded the Queen's Badge of Honour, for services to the Red Cross. In 2015, he was awarded the Star of Italy for his work with the Monte San Martino Trust. In 2021, he is to be awarded an honorary doctorate by Birmingham University.

Non-profit organization positions
| Preceded by Sam Younger | Chief Executive of the British Red Cross; 2001–2014 | Succeeded by Mike Adamson |
