= Malta Gaming Authority =

Gaming control board of Malta

Logo

The Malta Gaming Authority (MGA), formerly the Lotteries and Gaming Authority (LGA), is the gaming control board of Malta. It regulates most forms of gambling in its territory, including both land-based (casino, amusement and slot machines, betting offices, fantasy sports, and lotteries) and online gambling services including B2C and B2B services.

== History ==
The MGA was established in 2001 to regulate the various sectors of the gaming industry that fall under the MGA's authority, by ensuring fairness transparency to players using gaming services, preventing crime, corruption and money laundering and to protect minor and vulnerable players.

The MGA was one of the first regulators to offer legislation that regulates the activity of online gambling companies and create a secure atmosphere for players. A comprehensive set of legislation, regulations and directives regulate the industry, starting with Lotteries and Other Games Act, 2001, and Chapters 438 and 400 of the Laws of Malta.

The online gambling sector in Malta has grown tremendously since 2001, with the industry generating over 12% of the country's GDP.

== Functions ==
The MGA deals with:

- Protection of minors and vulnerable persons, while promoting responsible gaming in a safe environment.
- Licensing and regulation of the gaming operators.
- Guidance and cooperation at all stages of the application process.
- Protection of player funds, ensuring that all deposits and withdrawals are secure and enforceable.
- Ensure the integrity of games and gaming devices, via audits and independent testing facilities to ensure the randomness of results of all games of chance.
- Monitoring of licensee activities to ensure compliance.
- Regulatory Compliance Updates: Directs ongoing operational monitoring towards strict anti-money Laundering (AML), know you customer (KYC) protocols, and player protection detection mechanisms under its risk-based supervisory framework.
- Safeguarding of player rights, via investigation of complaints concerning the licensees on behalf of the players.
- Monitoring of activities to keep gaming free from criminal activities.
- Oversight of cryptocurrency transactions under its DLT sandbox (launched 2018) and permanent DLT policy, ensuring virtual-asset operators meet AML/KYC, audit and fairness standards.

The MGA cannot enforce any operator to return stakes that have been voluntary placed and lost in a fair game, but it can provide advice and assistance in enforcing the deposited money and the actual winnings and aids in dispute resolution with players and its licensees when necessary.

In addition, the new gambling law in Malta introduces "a duty of care for operators". The MGA licence holders are expected to monitor players' gambling habits, look for signs of problematic behaviour and intervene when necessary.

The MGA licenses several well-known online gambling companies. The list of current MGA licence holders is provided at the register page.
