= Eurofootball =

Eurofootball logo

Eurofootball (Bulgarian: Еврофутбол, Evrofutbol) is the first private Bulgarian bookmaker, as well as the country's largest. It began operating on 6 October 1990 and was officially registered in 1993, officially receiving a license on 20 October the same year. The first nationwide draw was performed on 21 August 1993. Eurofootball has developed its own strategy for community support, namely a social program and sponsorship one. For the 16 years of its operation, the company has become the leader in the field in the local market.

On 18 February 2002, Eurofootball became a partner of Intralot after the Greek company acquired a 49 percent stake for €11.75 million. On 12 August 2003, the company introduced a new centralised national live betting computer system, which cost around €10 million.

Eurofootball also prints a sports and betting newspaper by the same name, which is distributed twice-weekly. Among its other products is the annual statistical book Football Programmes and the book Systems for your Success.
