= BetEasy =

Australian betting platform

BetEasy Pty Ltd
- Type: Private
- Industry: Gaming
- Founded: 2014
- Defunct: 2020
- Headquarters: Melbourne, Australia
- Key people: Andrew Menz (CEO); Matthew Tripp (President)
- Website: www.beteasy.com.au

BetEasy (formerly known as CrownBet and BetEzy) was an Australian corporate bookmaker offering online sports and racing betting platforms. BetEasy was licensed in the Northern Territory and owned by The Stars Group. Following a merger between The Stars Group and Flutter Entertainment, BetEasy was merged with Sportsbet.

BetEasy was the official wagering partner of the Australian Football League and the only corporate bookmaker able to provide its customers with access to the popular Sky Racing channels directly through its betting applications.

== History ==
The BetEasy brand first launched in the Australian market in 2014 following the purchase and immediate rebrand of the former BetEzy brand by Matthew Tripp.

In December 2014, Crown Resorts acquired a 66% shareholding and BetEasy transitioned to the CrownBet brand in March 2015. The deal offered a world-first integration of an online wagering operator with a land-based casino operation.

In December 2017, Crown Resorts announced it would divest CrownBet as part of a string of asset sales that would raise nearly $700m.

The Stars Group acquired an 80% ownership interest in the combined companies through a series of transactions between February and April 2018. In August 2018, The Stars Group reinstated the BetEasy brand following the integration and migration of William Hill Australia with and into CrownBet. On 3 December 2019, The Stars Group announced it had acquired the remaining 20% in BetEasy. Tripp stood down as CEO and become non-executive president of BetEasy on 1 January 2020.

BetEasy remained Australian-based with offices in Darwin, Melbourne and Sydney. On 8 September 2020, BetEasy merged into Sportsbet. As a result, BetEasy was disbanded.

== Controversies ==
=== Illegal advertising ===
In April 2016, the company's joint venture with Matthew Tripp, CrownBet pleaded guilty to five counts of breaching laws by publishing illegal betting advertising that offered inducements for NSW residents to gamble. According to NSW Department of Justice, CrownBet "sought to have the matters finalised without conviction in Downing Centre Local Court yesterday but Magistrate Joanne Keogh said convictions were necessary for general deterrence to others in the industry and to protect the vulnerable. CrownBet was convicted of the five offences and ordered to pay a total of $10,500 in fines and also ordered to pay Liquor & Gaming NSW legal costs of $10,000."
