= Betsafe =

Online casino and betting company

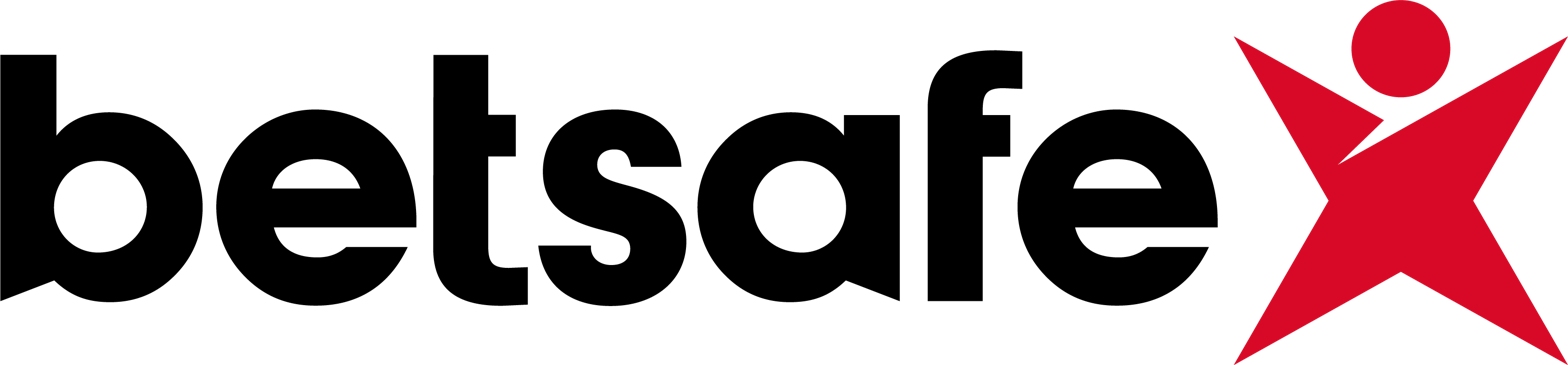
- Type: Subsidiary
- Industry: Online casino and sportbook
- Founded: 2006 in Norway
- Headquarters: Stockholm, Sweden
- Area served: Worldwide
- Parent: Betsson
- Website: betsafe.com (global); betsafe.lv (Latvia); betsafe.ee (Estonia); betsafe.pe (Peru)

Betsafe is an international sportsbook popular in the Baltic regions of Latvia and Estonia that is also licensed in Ontario, Sweden, and Peru. It is headquartered in Malta and is a subsidiary of Betsson, the online gambling giant listed in Sweden.

== History ==
Betsafe was founded in Norway in 2006 by André Lavold and a group including his brother, Christer Lavold, and Rudi Thomassen and Anders Berntsen. In 2011, Betsafe was acquired by Betsson which saw the acquisition as a way to grow its presence in Northern Europe. At the time, revenue for the 12-month period ending April 2011 was reported to amount to €33.4 million with operating profit of €6.9 million. The deal was worth €32.5 million, half of which was paid in cash and the other half in Betsson shares, corresponding to 4.7x multiple of Betsafe's operating profit.

Victoria Silvstedt was an ambassador for Betsafe filming five different commercials in Mallorca. The partnership was discontinued in 2012. In 2016, Betsafe partnered with Airbnb to rent out an "ultimate sports apartment" in downtown Stockholm, Sweden with three TV screens. In the same year, Betsson merged TonyBet and Triobet into Betsafe following their acquisitions to strengthen its position in the Baltic States.

In 2018, the Betsson group including Betsafe received a Swedish gaming license, making it the 12th jurisdiction it was approved to operate in. In 2021, Gestion reported that the majority of bets placed in Peru focused on European football with Real Madrid, Paris Saint-Germain and Liverpool named as popular clubs. In 2023, Betsafe went live in Ontario, Canada with both a B2C and B2B offering.

As of June 2025, Betsson has replaced the Betsafe brand in Lithuania with its flagship Betsson brand. As a result of this, Betsson is now the title sponsor of the Lithuanian Basketball League rather than Betsafe as of the 2025-26 season.

== Sponsorships ==
Betsafe is a prolific sponsor of sports teams across the Baltics. In Lithuanian basketball, Betsafe was the title sponsor of four teams in the Lietuvos krepšinio lyga, branded Betsafe-LKL, in addition to its sponsorship of the Lithuanian Basketball Federation. The deal with the league was extended for an additional three years in 2022. The sponsorship passed to its parent Betsson in 2025. The Baltic Women's Basketball League is also a recipient of Betsafe sponsorship.

BK Liepāja in the Latvian Basketball League also received a sponsorship from Betsafe in 2017. Felix Stephensen was sponsored by "Team Betsafe" in 2014. Betsafe is the exclusive betting partner of the GODSENT professional esports team and Manchester City F.C. The company had been shirt sponsor of AFC Leopards and Gor Mahia in the Kenyan Premier League but the partnership was terminated early with team officials blaming the sports ministry.

In motorsport, in 2018, Betsafe became the official European betting partner of Alfa Romeo's F1 Team. It also sponsors a team at the Gumball 3000, once bringing an F1 car to the event. The brand sponsored an Audi RS6 DTM with Betsafe branding for Swedish alpine skier Jon Olsson; the car was carjacked and burnt in Amsterdam in 2015.

== Regulatory actions and controversies ==
In Norway, the Norwegian Gambling Authority (Lotteritilsynet) stated in September 2023 that several offshore operators, including Betsson brands Betsafe and NordicBet, were in the process of withdrawing from targeting the Norwegian market following enforcement measures.

== See also ==
Betsson
