= BetFIRST =

Online gambling company

betFIRST
- Founded: 2011; 15 years ago
- Dissolved: 22 September 2026
- Successor: Betsson
- Headquarters: Etterbeek, Belgium
- Area served: Europe
- Founder: Groupe IPM
- Industry: Online gambling
- Services: Online betting and gaming, Horse betting, casino
- Website: www.betssoncasino.be (new) betssonsports.be (new) betfirst.dhnet.be (old) betfirstcasino.be (old)

betFIRST was a leading Belgian online casino and sports betting website until it was merged into and rebranded as Betsson in 2026.

Founded in 2011, it was acquired by the global online gambling company Betsson AB in 2023. In 2024, Betsson AB formed a partnership with the Casino de Middelkerke, owned by Groupe Partouche, which holds an A+ casino license. At the time, betFIRST had emerged as one of the top three players in the Belgian betting sector.

In 2026, Betsson announced that the betFIRST brand would be discontinued with users being transitioned to its flagship Betsson brand.

== History ==
betFIRST was established in 2011 by Groupe IPM, a Belgian company with interests in media, advertising, travel, insurtech, investment in innovation projects, and sports betting. Initially formed by François le Hodey, head of the IPM S.A. press group, the aim was to create a new sports betting brand, betFIRST, to generate additional revenue for press shops and support print media. Notably, betFIRST was one of the few online sports betting operators that is 100% Belgian-owned. Sagevas S.A., the company offering sports betting under the betFIRST label, was a subsidiary of the IPM press group, publisher of DH.

In 2018, a Belgian bettor made headlines by winning an exceptional €225,971.99 on the betFIRST sports betting platform, a record at that time.

In 2023, the IPM Group announced its withdrawal from the sports betting sector, selling betFIRST to the Swedish Betsson AB Group. This move aimed to strengthen Betsson AB's presence in the Belgian market. The acquisition, valued at €120 million, was facilitated by Sagevas, the company operating the betFIRST brand. The IPM Group, along with family investors, held more than 50% of betFIRST, alongside CEO Alexis Murphy and French entrepreneur Jacques Elalouf, who owned over a third of the shares. That same year, betFIRST announced the expansion of its supplier range by adding SYNOT Games to its game library.

In February 2024, betFIRST further expanded its offerings with Stakelogic Live. In 2026, the brand was discontinued with Belgian users moved to Betsson's flagship eponymous brand.

=== Products ===
==== Sports betting ====
betFIRST offers a wide range of sports betting options, including football, tennis, basketball, and more.

==== Dice ====
betFIRST provides a diverse selection of casino games and Dice Slots slot machines.

==== Live Casino ====
In 2024, betFIRST launched an online casino in partnership with Casino de Middelkerke, leveraging its A+ license.

== Licenses ==
Betsson AB holds licenses in several regulated markets, including Belgium. Since 2011, SAGEVAS S.A. has held an F license for sports betting and agencies, and since 2014, it has obtained a License B+ for online casinos. In 2013, it acquired the B license for casino games and arcade games through the acquisition of the company B&M, which previously held the license. In September 2026, the Belgian Gambling Commission reassigned the licenses from BetFIRST to Betsson with the sports betting license F1+ 116764 assigned to betssonsports.be and the online casino license A+ 595153 assigned to betssoncasino.be.

== Shareholders ==
List of main shareholders at 15 June 2023.

IPM Group and family investors	62%
Jacques Elalouf	38%

Since July 5, 2023, Betsson AB has held 100% of the shares following the acquisition of all shares of SAGEVAS and TF Holding.

== Sponsorship ==
betFIRST has engaged in several sponsorships, including partnerships with the Elite Series in 2020, sponsorship of the BNXT League in 2021, and becoming the New Jersey sponsor of the Royal Antwerp Football Club in 2022. This collaboration marked a significant partnership between the club and betFIRST, establishing the latter as one of the major sponsors of the Royal Antwerp Football Club for the next five seasons. In 2023, the Royal Antwerp Football Club became the Belgian champion and won the Belgian Cup.

In June 2025, Club Brugge signed a three-year shirt sponsorship agreement with the Betsson Group, in partnership with its local brand, BetFIRST. Reportedly worth €12 million through 2028, the deal was described as the largest shirt sponsorship agreement in the club’s history. Under its terms, betFIRST.sport featured on the club’s domestic shirts, while Betsson.sport appeared on its European shirts. The sponsorship branding subsequently transitioned from BetFIRST to Betsson as the flagship brand replaced BetFIRST in the local market.

== See more ==
- Official sport betting website
- Official casino website
