= Catena Media =

Malta-based public media company

Catena Media PLC
- Type: Public company
- Traded as: Nasdaq Stockholm: CTM
- Industry: Online gambling
- Founded: 2012
- Headquarters: Gzira, Malta
- Key people: Manuel Stan (CEO), Erick Flinck (chair), Michael Gerrow (CFO)
- Brands: thelines.com; LINEUPS; PlayUSA; CasinoBonus360; bonus.com; esports.net
- Revenue: ▼€47 million (2025)
- Operating income: ▲€6 million (2025)
- Net income: ▼ - €12 million (2025)
- Number of employees: 151 (2025)
- Website: catenamedia.com

Catena Media is a publicly-traded online gambling information company. It was founded in 2012 and employs 151 people in Malta, the United Kingdom, Sweden, the United States.

== History ==
In 2008, childhood friends Erik Bergman and Emil Thidell opened a web consulting agency. For the first two years, the business operated from Thidell's parents’ basement. In October 2010, the pair decided to move to Malta. In 2012, they established Catena Media, with a focus on the lead generation for online gambling operators.

In 2013, Catena Media began rapidly expanding, entering the Norwegian, Finnish, and Swedish markets. In October 2014, the company completed its first acquisition of the company Finix Invest, and in 2015 acquired eight more companies in the UK, the Netherlands, and Belgium. By the end of 2015, the company employed 50 people. In the first quarter of 2017, its revenues totaled EUR 15.23 million (7.46).

In 2020, company chair Kathryn Moore Baker and some other members of the Catena board of directors left in a leadership shake-up.

== Websites ==
=== AskGamblers.com ===
Catena Media acquired the website AskGamblers.com in April 2016 for €15 million (US$17.1 million). AskGamblers was one of Catena Media's largest websites, featuring a service to resolve player complaints. Players lodge disputes with the website, and an operator responds. Through the service, $47 million was returned to over 16,781 players in total as of 2022. On December 15th, 2022 Catena Media plc announced to have entered into an agreement to sell its AskGamblers business and associated global casino brands for EUR 45 million on a cash and debt free basis to a wholly owned subsidiary of Gaming Innovation Group Inc., an international provider of services to the online casino and sports betting industry.

=== Other websites ===
Catena Media acquired i15Media in December 2016. In late 2016, the company also acquired two British websites - SBAT.com, a sports statistics and betting tips website, for €13 million and CasinoUK.com, for US$13.38 million.

In April 2017, Catena Media relaunched casino comparison site JohnSlots.com. In December, it was announced that Catena Media had purchased Squawka, a football news website which had been going through financial difficulties, for $1.3 million. Catena Media also acquired Baybets Ltd. that same month.

In March 2018, Catena Media acquired the US-based BonusSeeker.com. In July 2018, Catena Media closed its acquisition of the foreign exchange market news website LeapRate.com.

On August 3rd, 2023, Catena Media plc signed an agreement to sell its UK and Australian online sports betting brands for EUR 6.0 million to Moneta Communications Ltd, a leading UK-based sports betting affiliate. The transaction covered the sale of all assets in Catena Media’s UK business, which includes sports betting brands Squawka and GG.co.uk, and all shares in the group’s wholly owned Australian subsidiary.

On November 21st, 2023, Catena Media plc announced it had entered into agreements to sell its Italy-facing online sports betting and casino assets for EUR 19.8 million to two different buyers. The transactions together cover the sale of Catena Media's Italian online sports and casino brands and related assets and mark the group’s exit from the Italian market.
