= GamStop =

National gambling self-exclusion system in the United Kingdom

GamStop is a national gambling self-exclusion scheme in the United Kingdom.

== History ==
GamStop was established in April 2018 after being delayed from late 2017. It has been mandatory for internet-based gambling services licensed in the United Kingdom since 31 March 2020.

In February 2021, GamStop saw a 21% growth in admissions, which was linked to an increase in spending on gambling in the previous year in the context of the COVID-19 lockdown.

In April 2023, Sky News reported an instance in the previous year in which William Hill permitted a person enrolled in the scheme to spend more than £2,000. In the following month, Paddy Power was handed a £490,000 fine by the Gambling Commission for electronically sending promotional material to GamStop registrants. The CEO of Paddy Power's parent company Flutter Entertainment Ian Brown apologised, saying that the company aimed to "lead the industry in safer gambling" and that the material was "was sent in error".

In early 2026, Gamstop reported a 40% increase in self-exclusion requests from gamblers aged 16-24 in the second half of 2025.

== Effectiveness ==
The Association of British Bookmakers cited a survey in which 83% of GamStop's users said that it had reduced or stopped their gambling, and 71% said that they had stopped using their nominated betting sites since joining the scheme. A 2019 investigation by the BBC found that a gambler who self-referred was still able to gamble by changing their user details, such as misspelling their surname.

In December 2025, The Guardian reported on foreign-registered gambling websites which circumvent the scheme. The publication further reported in March 2026 that generative AI chatbots including ChatGPT, Google Gemini, Microsoft Copilot and Meta AI were readily detailing methods to evade self-exclusion when prompted to do so.

== See also ==
- Self-exclusion
