= South Dakota Commission on Gaming =

Gaming board in South Dakota, US

Board overview
- Jurisdiction: South Dakota
- Headquarters: 445 East Capitol Avenue; Pierre, South Dakota; 57501-3185
- Board executive: Chair
- Website: gaming.sd.gov

Map

South Dakota Commission on Gaming (SDCG) is a gaming board in South Dakota that controls the state's gaming industry. The Board controls a regulatory and tax collection for video gaming and riverboat casinos.

== History ==
Slot machines and gaming were legalized in South Dakota in 1989. All state casinos are legally restricted to the city of Deadwood, about 60 miles up the Rushmore mountain. All slot machine distributors and manufacturers should obtain a license from the South Dakota Gaming Commission.

All Distributors or Slot Machine Manufacturers should submit an application fee ($5,000) for a license. The applicant is to pay a $500.00 licensing fee for the Associated Equipment License and a $1,000.00 licensing fee for the Slot Machine License. Renewal costs $250 per year.

The interests of South Dakota's commercial casino industry are being represented by The Deadwood Gaming Association (DGA), a non-profit association founded in 1990.

== Board members ==
- Tim Holland (Chairman)
- Dennis McFarland (Vice Chair)
- Karl Fischer (Commissioner)
- Karen Wagner (Commissioner)
- Mike Wordeman (Commissioner)
