= Australian Total Diet Survey =

Assessment of consumers' diet

The Australian Total Diet Survey, formerly known as the Australian Market Basket Survey, is an assessment of consumers' dietary exposure to pesticide residues, contaminants, and other substances.
