= Whitelisted gambling jurisdictions =

Whitelisted gambling jurisdictions are those gambling jurisdictions that are allowed to advertise gambling services on the territory of the United Kingdom.

Section 331 of the Gambling Act 2005 forbids all countries, territories or jurisdictions that are not part of the EEA and are located outside the UK and Gibraltar to advertise their gambling services on the territory of the UK. An exception is made only for those jurisdictions that proved that they meet the requirements set by the Gambling Act 2005 and listed in a special guidance document, issued by the Department for Culture, Media and Sport.

According to this document, the government or other authority of those countries, territories or jurisdictions that wish to advertise their gambling services in the UK, have to submit representations to the Secretary of State. The latter assesses the representations considering the criteria listed in the guidance document and decides whether to allow the country to advertise on the territory of the UK (adding the country to the whitelist) or rejecting the application. These rules came into force on September 1, 2007, and, according to James Purnell, the Secretary of State for Culture, Media and Sport at that time, introduced "one of the most rigorous regulatory regimes anywhere in the world."

== Whitelisted jurisdictions ==
The whitelist currently includes:

- EEA countries
- Alderney
- Antigua and Barbuda
- Gibraltar
- Isle of Man
- Tasmania

Alderney and the Isle of Man were accepted in 2007. Antigua was added in 2008 upon its second application. Tasmania joined the whitelist in 2008.

In April 2009, the UK Gambling Commission closed all new applications to the Whitelist in order to improve the system.

== Requirements for inclusion ==
The guidance document is also used to inform the potential applicants of which information they have to provide to prove that they have an appropriate gambling regulatory regime, i.e. regime which achieves the objectives indicated in section 1 of the Gambling Act and under which the UK gambling regime operates. It means ensuring that:

- gambling is conducted in a fair way
- gambling is not a source of crime and disorder
- gambling is not used to support crime
- gambling doesn't affect children or vulnerable persons
- gambling operators are subject to rules on money-laundering and financial probity.

All jurisdictions that wish to be on the white list have to provide evidence that those gambling products that will be advertised will allow the players to:

- access the game rules (including rules in English)
- claim their winnings within a long enough period of time
- easily get in contact with the appropriate authorities to resolve any disputes arising from using those gambling products

== Opponents ==
In 2007, the Royal College of Psychiatrists made submissions to the Gambling Commission and the Secretary of State for Culture Media and Sport regarding the provisions of the Gambling Act 2005, saying that the regulation of remote gambling, advertising of foreign operators in particular, was not compliant with objectives set by section 1 of the Gambling Act 2005. The representatives of the college asked to postpone the deregulation of the advertising of gambling.

In 2010, Steve Donoughue, management consultant specialising in gambling made a submission to the UK Gambling Commission, requesting the information about the procedure of checking the applicants that wish to be added to the whitelist. The Commission responded that the members of the Commission never physically visited the jurisdictions before whitelisting them. This information led to further criticism from Steve Donoughue, as he insisted that insufficient research was conducted by the authorities responsible for adding the countries to the whitelist.

The white list system is being disputed by the Culture Secretary Jeremy Hunt who wants to stop non-UK licensed companies from promoting their activities in the UK. Hunt said that he would rather work towards creating conditions for gambling organisations to move their businesses to the UK.
