= IAS Limited =

International All Sports Limited
- Industry: Gambling
- Founded: 1995
- Headquarters: Melbourne & Darwin, Australia and London, England
- Products: Sports betting, online poker and online casino.

International All Sports Limited is an Australian-based gambling company, best known for its online gambling subsidiaries Canbet and IASBet, which it acquired in a merger in August 2004. Canbet is licensed and regulated by the UK Gambling Commission. IAS also runs Aus Tote, an Australian tote betting company and IAS Read Rating & OzeForm, both form analysis companies.

== Canbet ==
In 2014 the directors announced that they were unable to pay clients and would, 'work with a business asset agent to liquidate assets from within Canbet and its associated companies'.

News of Canbet's issues paying customers was first noted on the Gambling Times and SportsbookReview in October 2013.
