= Victorian Commission for Gambling Regulation =

Gambling regulator in Victoria, Australia

Agency overview
- Formed: 2004
- Dissolved: 6 February 2012
- Superseding agency: Victorian Commission for Gambling and Liquor Regulation (VCGLR)
- Jurisdiction: Victoria, Australia
- Parent agency: Victorian Department of Justice

The Victorian Commission for Gambling Regulation (VCGR) was the gambling regulator in the Australian state of Victoria from 2004 until February 2012. The VCGR was part of the Victorian Department of Justice.

The VCGR regulated the four gambling operators who held a gambling licence in Victoria:

- Tabcorp Holdings Limited
- Tatts Group Limited
- Crown Casino
- Intralot

On 6 February 2012, the VCGR merged with Responsible Alcohol Victoria and formed the Victorian Commission for Gambling and Liquor Regulation (VCGLR). The VCGLR took on the roles and functions of the Victorian Commission for Gambling Regulation, the Director of Liquor Licensing and the Liquor Licensing Panel. The Commission had the power to undertake disciplinary actions and assumed the administrative and educative functions of Responsible Alcohol Victoria.
