= Totolotek =

Polish betting company

Totolotek S.A.
- Company type: Spółka Akcyjna
- Industry: Betting company
- Founded: 1992
- Headquarters: ul. Taneczna 18b 02-829 Warsaw, Poland
- Key people: President: Adam Lamentowicz
- Website: totolotek.pl

Totolotek is a betting company based in Warsaw, Poland. The business activity is conducted on the basis of the Gambling Act (Journal of Laws of 2022, item 888) on the basis of permits and regulations of mutual betting granted by the Ministry of Finance of the Republic of Poland. Since 2019 Totolotek is part of the German Gauselmann Group.

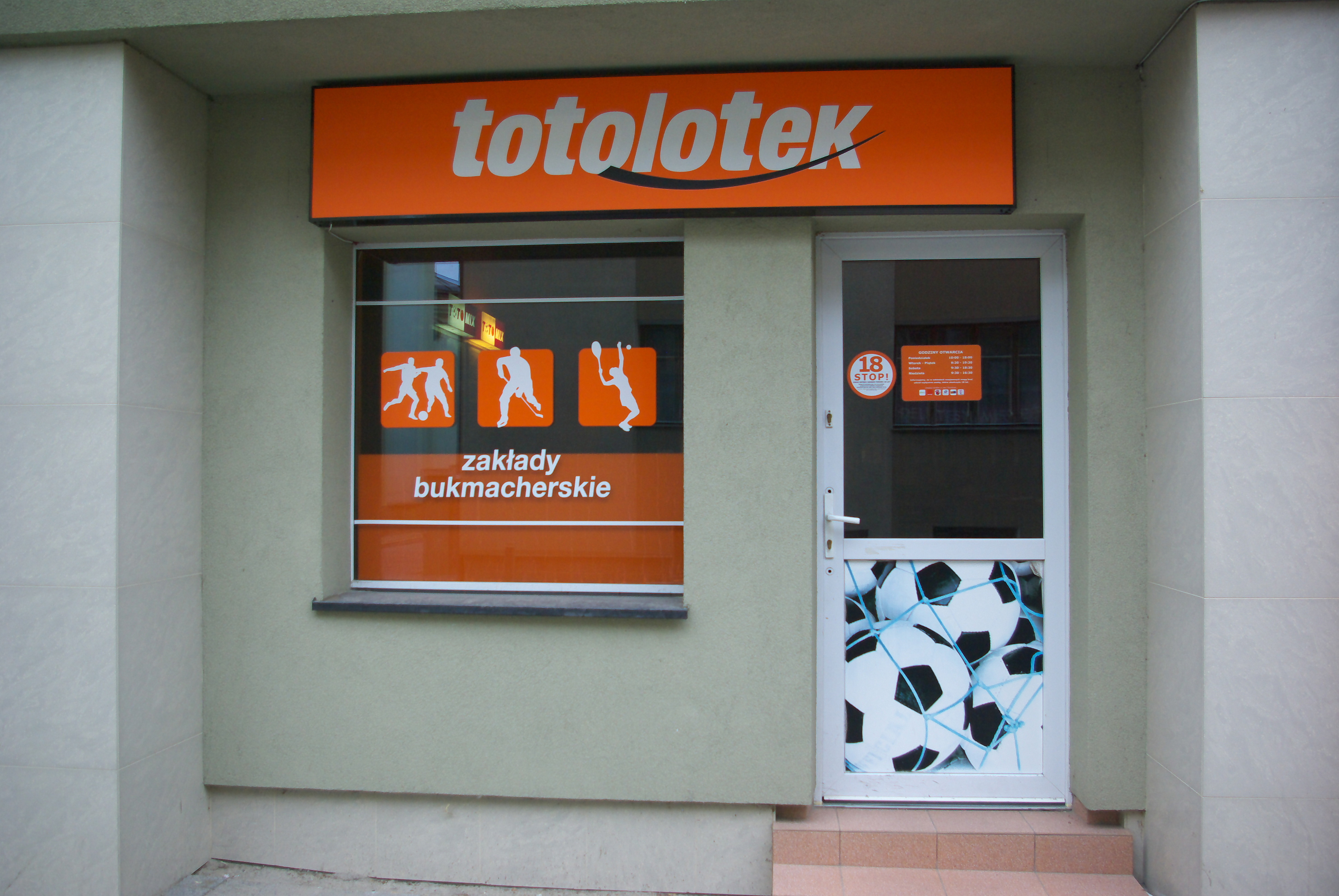
The outside of a Tolotek shop, 2015

== Company activities ==
The object of the Company's activity is to organize mutual bets in Poland in accordance with the permits and approved regulations of mutual wagering issued by the Minister of Finance. The activity is governed by the provisions of the Act of 19 November 2009 on gambling. Mutual bets are bets on cash or in-kind prizes based on the guessing of:

- results of sports competitions between people or animals, in which participants pay rates, and the amount of the prize depends on the total amount of the so-called sweepstakes;
- occurrence of various events, in which participants pay rates, and the amount of winnings depends on the agreed rate between the host and the payer, the ratio of the payment to the winnings of the so-called Bookmaking.

Totolotek has in its offer both bookmaker bets on the majority of disciplines and sports games as well as betting on football totalizator and totalizator of horse races taking place around the world. Totolotek as a bookmaker has around 350 betting points in Poland. The bookmaker also includes events presented via the website and the mobile application.

== Sponsorships ==
Totolotek actively promotes sports within Poland. To reach the targets set by the company itself, promoting youth sports and participation, the company has sponsored the following teams. Since 2010 the company has also been a sponsor of the Legia Warsaw youth academy.

Team	Sport	Date	Source
Lechia Gdańsk	Football	2014–2019	
Jagiellonia Białystok	Football	2014–Present	
Górnik Zabrze	Football	2014–2016	
Wisła Kraków	Football	2014–2016	
Legia Warsaw	Basketball	2016–Present	
PGE Skra Bełchatów	Volleyball	2018–Present	
Polish Cup	Football Cup Competition	2017–Present	
