= University Compare =

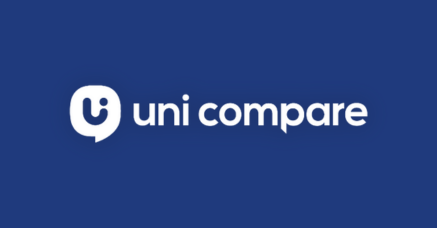

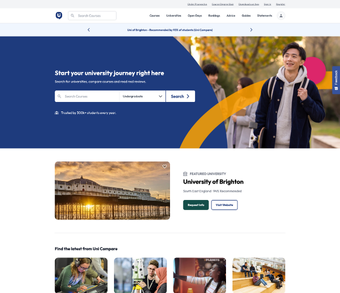
- University Compare homepage.
- Website type: Education
- Available in: English
- Founded: June 15, 2014; 12 years ago
- Creator: Owen O'Neill
- Website: www.universitycompare.com
- Commercial: Yes
- Users: 500,000+
- Current status: Private

University Compare is a free university comparison website, founded in 2014, by UK entrepreneur, Owen O'Neill. The website aims to provide students information on universities in the United Kingdom, their degrees as well as providing information on the living experience of university, detailed guides on the various university cities in the UK and general advice. The website is for students that enter higher education through Universities and Colleges Admissions Service (UCAS) each year.

== History ==
University Compare was founded as Student Nightlife in June 2010 and was the largest events company for Chelmsford, Romford, Brentwood and its surrounding areas. When University Compare's founder, Owen O'Neill, founded Student Nightlife, it wasn't intended to be a universal comparison site for prospective students until guidance from The Big Pitch run by Anglia Ruskin University's Entrepreneurship CEDAR development team had helped the vision of what students really need when entering higher education.

In 2016 University Compare quickly become one of the most used services by students. With 19.2% of all student's using their service for Clearing 2016, seen as widely successful amongst UK universities and from large sets of press, such as; Metro, Telegraph and Independent.

== Awards ==
University Compare helps 500,000+ students enter into higher education each year and was nominated for 'New Kid On The Block' 2014 award by Education Investor Awards 2014. Alongside the awards was also Kevin McNeany who won an Outstanding Individual Contribution towards Education accolade at the same awards.
