= Celton Manx =

Company that provides online gambling products

Celton Manx Limited
- Website type: Private Limited
- Area served: International
- Key people: William Mummery (Executive Director)
- Industry: Online gambling, Sports betting
- Website: http://celtonmanx.com

Celton Manx Limited is a company that provides online gambling products; it provides a platform for sports betting, live casino games, race betting and animated flash games. It is headquartered in and regulated by the Government of the Isle of Man, British Isles.

In February 2009, Celton Manx was granted the first Isle of Man licence by the Isle of Man Gambling Supervision Commission to operate a live dealer online casino.

== Awards ==
Celton Manx won the Appleby Award for Excellence in the Use of Technology by the Isle of Man in 2009.

The EGR Asian Operator of the Year Award was won in both 2009 and 2010. It is also ranked as 14th on the list of Power 50 companies in eGaming Review's 2012 ranking of 50 most influential operators. In 2011, it was ranked as 11th on the same list.

In 2010, Celton Manx won International or the year award which they sponsored three years later.

== Charity ==
The Isle of Man Athletes Association's 2013 and 2014 track and field championships were sponsored by Celton Manx.

Celton Manx Limited did sponsor the 2011 and 2012 STEP programmes. The scheme is designed for undergraduates to undertake a technical or business development project within a small or medium-sized organisation whilst also gaining valuable experience in the workplace.

== Sponsorship ==
Celton Manx was the four-year shirt sponsor of West Ham United from 2009 to the end of 2012-2013 season, and Cardiff City for 2010-2011 season.

In August 2013, Celton Manx announced its Asian Betting Partnership agreements with five Barclays English Premier League teams, becoming the official Asian betting partner of Swansea City A.F.C., West Ham United F.C., Southampton F.C., Hull City A.F.C. and Norwich City F.C. for the 2013-14 season.

It also took on the title sponsors for the inaugural Soccerex Asian Forum on 28 July 2010, Singapore.
