= Alan Eskander =

Australian entrepreneur

- Born: Alan Eskander; 1975 (age 50–51)
- Occupation: Bookmaker
- Years active: 1997–present
- Parent: Father: Michael Eskander
- Website: http://www.betstar.com.au/

Alan Eskander (born 1975) is an Australian entrepreneur and licensed bookmaker who together with his father, Michael Eskander, founded the Australian bookmaking company Betstar in 2007. Eskander lives in Melbourne, though travels to the Northern Territory (of Australia) for business.

== Personal life ==
Eskander was exposed at an early age to the life of bookmaking through his father's business activities. Eskander's father, Michael, immigrated to Australia from Egypt in 1966, earning his bookmaking licence in 1984, and subsequently going on to become a prominent name in the Australian bookmaking industry.

Eskander spent much of his childhood at the race track and betting ring. Talking about early life as a bookmaker's son, and of the nature of the industry in general, Eskander said: “You can’t get too excited when you have really big days and similarly you try not to get too upset when you have losing days but obviously anything outside the norm does impact your mood. And so yeah, there were some times when we had plans to go out for dinner on a Saturday night and Dad would come home and go, ‘listen guys, [we’ll] just stay at home, it’s been a rough day.”

== Career ==
=== Early days ===
Eskander's first practical introduction to bookmaking came from working as a clerk for his father's booking making business at the age of 18, while studying Commerce at university.

Eskander initially viewed this more as a means to pay his way through his degree. Eskander said “It was just a great part time job. I worked with Dad, I was a clerk ... Working on the racetrack is dynamic and exciting.”

Receiving his first bookmaker's license in 1997, Eskander started fielding country race tracks before being granted his Metropolitan rails licence in 2000, during his final year at university.

After working for some years with his father, and with his Metropolitan bookmaking license behind him, Eskander began operating on his own as a bookmaker in Victoria at country race meetings. “I was trading as a sole proprietor under my own name, Dad was trading under his name and we paralleled and it was fine.” recalls Eskander.

=== Forming Betstar ===
Combining 40 years of bookmaking experience on racing and sports across Australia, Eskander, along with father and long-time bookmaker, Michael, formed Eskander's Betstar in 2006, a Corporate Bookmaking operation licensed and based in Melbourne and Darwin.

In 2009, Betstar was named as a BRW Fast 100 company for 2009. During Eskander's acceptance of the award, he reflected on the success of Betstar to date as being a result of “good old fashioned service”.

Eskander said at the time, "The bookmaking industry is highly competitive so you need to look after your members, we often get feedback that dealing with Betstar is like dealing with a good mate which is a stark contrast to the 'next please' service offered by some of our competitors."

Betstar has quickly grown to become one of Australia's most reputable corporate bookmakers, offering markets on sports, racing and entertainment on events around the world. Currently, Betstar is the only family owned Australian corporate bookmaker left in the market. For this reason, Betstar tends to be patriotic in its advertising without being over the top, promoting the fact that profits stay in Australia rather than get siphoned off overseas.

Eskander is often a guest on 3AW's Sports Today as well as his opinions represented on their website. He has featured on other radio stations, including the Bet Stars and Stripes show which runs on SEN's 'All Night Appetite' and has featured on an ABC report into NRL betting.
