= Liquor & Gaming NSW =

Agency of New South Wales Government

Agency overview
- Formed: February 2016
- Preceding agencies: NSW Office of Liquor Gaming & Racing; Liquor Administration Bureau; Licensing Court of New South Wales
- Jurisdiction: New South Wales
- Headquarters: 12 Darcy Street, Parramatta
- Employees: 240
- Agency executive: Emma Hogan, Secretary, Department of Customer Service
- Key documents: Liquor Act 2007 (NSW); Gaming Machines Act 2001 (NSW); Gaming And Liquor Administration Act 2007 (NSW); 2 more; Registered Clubs Act 1976 (NSW); Casino Control Act 1992 (NSW)
- Website: http://www.liquorandgaming.nsw.gov.au

Footnotes
- In 2007 some functions of the former Liquor Administration Board were transferred to the newly created Independent Liquor and Gaming Authority.

Liquor & Gaming NSW is an agency of the Government of New South Wales, that is part of the Customer Service cluster. Liquor and Gaming NSW is responsible for the development, implementation and integrity of the regulatory framework for liquor sales, licensed clubs, gaming activities and casino regulation in the state of New South Wales, Australia.

The agency reports to the Minister for Customer Service and Digital Government.

Liquor and Gaming NSW also provides Secretariat services to the Independent Liquor and Gaming Authority, which determines licence applications and makes associated decisions, and exercises some decision-making delegations granted by the Authority.
