= Betsson =

Swedish-Italian online-gambling products company

Betsson AB
- Type: Public
- Traded as: Nasdaq Stockholm: BETS B
- Industry: Online gambling (holding company)
- Founded: December 3, 1963; 62 years ago, in Sweden
- Founder: Bill Lindwall and Rolf Lundström
- Headquarters: Ta' Xbiex, Malta (de jure) Stockholm, Sweden (de facto)
- Key people: Pontus Lindwall (CEO since 4 September 2017)
- Brands: betsson.com betsafe.com casinoeuro.com nordicbet.com krooncasino.com and more
- Revenue: ▲€1,106.6 million (2024)
- Operating income: ▲€210.5 million (2024)
- Net income: ▲€173 million (2024)
- Number of employees: 1,800
- Subsidiaries: Betsson Malta Ltd.
- Website: betssonab.com; betssongroup.com

Betsson AB is a Swedish online gambling company, producing casino, poker, bingo, sports betting, and scratch cards websites through more than 20 online gaming brands, including betFIRST, Betsson, Betsafe, and NordicBet.

Betsson AB is listed on the Nasdaq Stockholm Large Cap List.

== History ==
Betsson AB can trace its roots back to 1963, and the foundation of AB Restaurang Rouletter by Bill Lindwall and Rolf Lundström, later renamed Cherryföretagen AB (Cherry), which provided slot machines to restaurants in Sweden. Cherry acquired a minority share of Net Entertainment in 1998, which was a company co-founded with Investment AB Kinnevik, tasked with developing online gaming solutions. The rest of the shares in Net Entertainment held by Kinnevik was acquired by Cherry in 2000, making Kinnevik the largest shareholder of Cherry in the process. In 2003, after the return of Pontus Lindwall (son of Bill Lindwall), as the CEO of Cherry, the company bought into Betsson (founded by Henrik Bergquist, Anders Holmgren and Fredrik Sidfalk), which had a gaming licence in England at that time, and later acquired a licence in Malta. In 2006, Cherryföretagen changed its name to Betsson and the traditional gaming operation in the business sector of Cherry merged to become a new group, Cherryföretagen, which later shortened the name back to Cherry.

In 2011, the company acquired all of the shares in the Betsafe Group for SEK 292 M. The aim of the acquisition was to increase Betsson's market presence and enable continued growth. The acquisition grew Betsson's number of customers to approximately 419,000 — surpassing Unibet in the number of active players. That same year Betsson signed an agreement with a Chinese state-owned company regarding the development of joint-owned gaming operations.

Ulrik Bengtsson became CEO of Betsson in March 2016 following Pontus Lindwall, who stayed on as chairman of the board. Bengtsson stepped down as CEO on 4 September, 2017 with Pontus Lindwall again taking the reins and Patrick Svensk appointed chairman of the Board after Pontus.

In March 2017, Betsson completed its £26 million acquisition of NetPlay TV's assets, adding Jackpot247, SuperCasino and Vernons to its European gaming multi-brand portfolio. In February 2020, Betsson acquired Gaming Innovation Group B2C assets.

In May 2021, Betsson obtaining two licenses from the Hellenic Gaming Commission for their brand. In 2021, it was announced that Betsson will be launching in Mexico through a partnership with local company Big Bola Casinos.

In 2021, Betsson expanded its operations in Eastern Europe with the launch of new brand Europebet and a new office in Minsk, Belarus. Under the brand Europobet – Betsson will offer casino, sportsbook and poker services. Also in 2021, Betsson announced CEO Pontus Lindwall would step down with the company on the lookout for a new CEO after Lindwall accomplished the task of getting the betting company back on track, with Lindwall staying on until a new CEO is hired.

In August 2021, Betsson acquired Inkabet. Betsson subsidiary SW Nordic Limited brokered the $25 million deal. As part of the deal Betsson agreed to a $4 million performance incentive if Inkabet outperform EBIT targets. Also in August 2021, Betsson acquired 28% of Canadian start-up Slapshot Media Inc, for a purchase price of $2.4 million.

In 2022, Betsson debuted online betting in Buenos Aires city and province (Argentina) with local operator Casino Victoria. Pontus Lindwall reported that organic growth is a perfect strategy for Betsson. Between April and June, group's organic traffic from Latin America, Central and Eastern Europe and Central Asia increased the growth by 13% in 2022. Total revenue from the region reached €45.7m in Q2 which increased by 86.2% compared to the previous year.

In 2023, Betsson launched sportsbetting in Italy with Roma legend Francesco Totti as ambassador. In July 2026, Betsson revealed that Latin America had emerged as its largest market.

== Products ==
Betsson AB's subsidiaries owns and operates a number of websites via its subsidiaries in Malta, where its operational headquarters are based. In November 2017, Betsson signed a deal with Scout gaming to integrate its daily fantasy sports platform across all its brands, including Betsafe. The integration was expected to be completed by 2018. Betsafe, which is active in the Baltic States of Lithuania, Latvia, and Estonia, is also active in Ontario, Sweden, and Peru. As of June 2025, Betsson has replaced the Betsafe brand in Lithuania with the flagship Betsson brand.

=== Sponsorships ===
Betsson extensively uses sponsorships of teams and leagues to promote its brands. Betsson was a regional sponsor of the 2021 Copa América. As part of the deal, Betsson will acquire branding rights. Meanwhile, the company also launched a commercial partnership and acquired sponsorship rights to Peru's Liga 1 for four years in 2021 with the championship being branded the Betsson Liga 1. The deal was extended for an additional four years in 2023. Also in May 2021, Betsson partnered with Norwegian Toppserien women's football club Avaldsnes IL.

In Greece, Betsson became the sponsor of Super League Greece 2, which feeds into Super League Greece for the 2021–22 season. That deal was renewed for a second season in 2022. Betsson added its sponsorship of the Greek Football Cup in 2023. It is also the main sponsor of OFI, its first partnership with an individual team in the Super League Greece.

Betsson also became the official betting partner of the Rossoneri when it announced a partnership with AC Milan. Also in 2022, Betsson was announced as the kit sponsor of Club Athletico Paranaense.

In 2023, Betsson became the main sponsor of Boca Juniors through 2024 with its logo featured on both men's and women's team kits. It also announced its sponsorship of Racing Club de Avellaneda starting in 2023. Meanwhile, the Chilean Primera División announced a title sponsorship by Betsson with its championship to be branded Campeonato Betsson. In 2024, Betsson was announced as the primary sponsor of Inter Milan in a four-year deal that was described as the most important in the club's history and will see Betsson featured prominently on player kits.

As of the 2025–26 LKL season, Betsson has replaced Betsafe as the title sponsor of the Lithuanian Basketball League reflecting its rebranding in the market.

=== Ambassadors ===
Also in 2022, Colombian footballer Mario Alberto Yepes became a Betsson brand ambassador in Latin America. He was joined by compatriot Nicole Regnier later in the year.

In 2023, AS Roma legend Francesco Totti became a Bettson ambassador. In 2024, Betsson announced Zé Roberto, the Brazilian footballer, and Paolo Guerrero, Peru's all-time record goalscorer, as ambassadors.

== Awards and social impact ==
Betsson won the ESG Strategy of the Year, Customer Service Operator of the Year, and Sports Betting Operator of the Year (silver) at the 2024 eGaming Review (ECR) awards in London. A number of the awards have been won for consecutive years. Betsson also won the Casino Operator of the Year, Leader of the Award (for Andrea Rossi), and Marketing Campaign of the Year awards at the SBC Awards Latinoamerica 2023. In 2024, the company again won Leader of the Year and Sportsbook Operator of the Year. At the iGaming Idol Awards 2023, the company won the Casino Operator Idol of the Year and Sportsbook Operator Idol of the Year titles.

Betsson is a supporter of the UN Global Compact initiative for ethical corporate practices. The company reports that its board of directors is 43% women and 25% of its executive management level is women with over 80% of employees stating that they believe they have equal opportunities at the company regardless of background.
