= The Stars Group =

Canadian gaming and online gambling company

The Stars Group Inc.
- Type: Public
- Traded as: Nasdaq: TSG; TSX: TSGI
- Industry: Online gambling
- Predecessor: Amaya Inc.
- Founded: 2001; 25 years ago
- Defunct: May 5, 2020
- Fate: Acquired by Flutter Entertainment
- Headquarters: Toronto, Ontario, Canada
- Area served: Worldwide
- Key people: Rafael Ashkenazi (CEO); Divyesh Gadhia (chairman)
- Revenue: ▲US$ 2.0 billion (2018)
- Net income: ▼US$ -0.1 billion (2018)
- Total assets: ▲US$ 11.3 billion (2018)
- Total equity: ▲US$ 4.2 billion (2018)
- Number of employees: 4,500 (2019)
- Website: www.starsgroup.com

The Stars Group Inc. (formerly known as Amaya Inc., Amaya Gaming Group Inc. and Rational Group) was a Canadian gaming and online gambling company headquartered in Toronto, Ontario, Canada. Its shares were traded on Nasdaq and the Toronto Stock Exchange. It operated poker, casino and sports betting products under the PokerStars, Full Tilt Poker, BetStars, and Fox Bet brands.

Stars Interactive, the online gaming division of The Stars Group, was headquartered in Onchan, Isle of Man where PokerStars had an office since 2005, almost five years after its inception. It held licences or related approvals to operate from 17 jurisdictions and offers its products and services in Europe, North America and elsewhere. In the jurisdictions where it operates, it either maintained a local licence or approval, or used multi-jurisdictional licences issued by the Isle of Man or Malta.

On May 5, 2020, the company was sold to Irish gaming conglomerate Flutter Entertainment.

== History ==
In June 2014, the company led by David Baazov agreed to buy the parent company of PokerStars and Full Tilt Poker, owned by Isai and Mark Scheinberg, for $4.9 billion borrowing $3 billion for the deal. The takeover made The Stars Group, then called Amaya, the world's biggest publicly listed online gambling company. The deal was closed on August 1, 2014, with final payment being made on May 31, 2017.

David Baazov was Amaya's CEO at that time. In March 2016, following charges by Canadian regulators with multiple securities fraud charges, he took an indefinite leave of absence, and resigned in August. Back in 2014 he was named the youngest king of gambling, and in 2016 AMF prosecutors in the courtroom proclaimed: "David and Josh Baazovs are scammers". The proceedings continued until 2018

On June 6, 2018, the Court of Quebec ordered a Stay of the Proceedings brought by the Autorité des Marchés Financiers (Canada) against David Baazov. The Supreme Court of Canada states that a stay of proceedings is the "ultimate remedy," which prevents the court from ever adjudicating the matter. A Stay of Proceedings under Canadian law is the equivalent to a dismissal with prejudice under U.S. law.

On December 20, 2016, Baazov dropped a bid to buy the company with a "virtually unknown" group of outside investors, one of whom denied being involved.

In December 2015, a Kentucky court ordered that Amaya pay $870 million in penalties to cover alleged losses by the state's residents who played real-money poker on the PokerStars website between 2006 and 2011.

In December 2018, the Kentucky Court of Appeals overturned this $870 million judgment on the grounds that the state lacked standing to claim damages under the Loss Recovery Act, which "was never intended to be used in this fashion." Current CEO Rafi Ashkenazi became Interim Chief Executive Officer of The Stars Group, then Amaya, in March 2016 and then permanent chief executive officer in November, 2016. On August 1, 2017, the company changed its name to The Stars Group Inc. Retired US Army General and former Democratic Party presidential nominee Wesley Clark is a former member of the board of directors. In April 2018, the company acquired UK-focused Sky Betting & Gaming for cash and stock worth $4.7 billion.

In May 2019, Fox Sports announced a partnership with The Stars Group to develop sports betting platforms (including free-to-play, and real-money gambling in states where it is legal) for the U.S. market under the Fox Bet banner—becoming the first major U.S. sports broadcaster to introduce a co-branded sports betting platform. As part of the partnership, Fox Corporation acquired a 4.99% stake in the company for $236 million. There was also an option for Fox to acquire up to a 50% stake in The Stars Group's U.S. operations within the next 10 years.

On October 2, 2019, Flutter Entertainment announced an agreement to acquire The Stars Group for $6 billion. Fox will have the option to acquire an 18.5% stake in its U.S. subsidiary FanDuel Group in 2021. On December 3, 2019, The Stars Group announced it had completed its acquisition of Australian online sports betting business BetEasy after originally acquiring a majority stake in the company (then known as CrownBet) from casino operator Crown Resorts in 2018.

The sale of The Stars Group to Flutter was completed on May 5, 2020.
