= Betstar =

Australian corporate bookmaking firm

- Industry: Online Betting; Bookmaking; Sports Betting
- Founded: Melbourne & Darwin, Australia (2007)
- Founders: Michael Eskander, Alan Eskander
- Headquarters: Brisbane & Darwin, Australia
- Area served: Australia
- Revenue: ▲ A$275.94 million (2012)
- Number of employees: 40 (2012)
- Website: betstar.com.au

Betstar (also known as Eskander's Betstar) established in 2007, is an Australian Corporate Bookmaking firm that are based and established within Melbourne and Darwin. BetStar were acquired by British bookmakers Ladbrokes Coral (formerly Ladbrokes) in 2014. In 2018, Ladbrokes Coral (and therefore Betstar) were acquired by gaming group Entain (formerly GVC Holdings).

Betstar employ 40+ staff split between the Melbourne & Darwin offices. Betstar turns over in excess of $275 million per year.

== Founders ==
Betstar was founded by father and son bookmakers, Michael and Alan Eskander who had both been operating as independent bookmakers before merging the two businesses together. In October 2009 Eskander's Betstar was announced as a Business Review Weekly Fast 100 company, the BRW Fast 100 ranks companies with according to their average annual turnover growth over three years

=== Michael Eskander ===
Michael Eskander emigrated to Australia from Egypt in July 1966, working as a bank teller initially and moving onto a number of industries before being exposed to bookmaking. Michael was awarded his licence over 17 years ago. After being granted his licence, Michael worked his way to become one of Australia's most prominent and well respected bookmakers. Michael Eskander was known for being a bookie to a number of Australian identities including Kerry Packer, whom once placed A$400,000 bet on Jezabeel via Eskander in the 1998 Melbourne Cup.

=== Alan Eskander ===
Alan Eskander, son of Michael was educated at Trinity Grammar School, Kew and later achieved a bachelor of Commerce, majoring in economics. Alan received his first bookmaker's licence in 1997 and started fielding at country race tracks, three years later Alan was granted his Metropolitan rails licence. Alan is a registered member of the Victorian Bookmakers Association. Betstar are known for their authoritativeness as a source in many of Melbourne's newspapers about sporting & horse racing betting odds.
