= Gambling Commission =

UK statutory authority

- Royal Coat of Arms of the United Kingdom as used by HM Government

Agency overview
- Formed: 1 September 2007; 19 years ago
- Preceding agency: Gaming Board
- Type: Executive non-departmental public body
- Jurisdiction: Great Britain
- Headquarters: Victoria Square House, Victoria Square, Birmingham, B2 4BP
- Motto: Keeping gambling fair and safe for all
- Employees: 310 (2021/22)
- Minister responsible: Lisa Nandy, Secretary of State for Digital, Culture, Media and Sport
- Agency executives: Sarah Gardner, Acting Chief Executive Officer; Ruth Evans, Chair
- Parent department: Department for Digital, Culture, Media and Sport
- Website: gamblingcommission.gov.uk

Map
- Great Britain in the UK and Europe

The Gambling Commission is an executive, non-departmental public body of the Government of the United Kingdom responsible for regulating gambling and supervising gaming law in Great Britain. Its remit covers arcades, betting, bingo, casinos, slot machines and lotteries, as well as remote gambling, but not spread betting which is regulated by the Financial Conduct Authority. Free prize competitions and draws are free of the Commission's control under the "Gambling Act 2005".

The stated aims of the Commission are to keep crime out of gambling, Ensure it is conducted in a fair and open manner and to protect the vulnerable. It issues licences to operators and advises the government on gambling-related issues. It also collaborates with the police over suspected illegal gambling. The Commission replaced the Gaming Board for Great Britain in 2007. In 2013, it assumed responsibility for regulating the National Lottery.

== History ==
The Gambling Commission was established under the Gambling Act 2005 and assumed full powers in 2007, taking over responsibility from the Gaming Board for Great Britain, in regulating arcades, betting, bingo, casinos, slot machines and lotteries, but not spread betting (regulated by the Financial Conduct Authority). The Commission is a non-departmental public body, sponsored by the Department for Digital, Culture, Media and Sport.

It is also responsible for remote gambling which includes betting online, by telephone and other communication devices using the equipment, that offer or advertise services to the residents of Great Britain.

On 1 October 2013, the National Lottery Commission, which regulated the National Lottery, became part of the Gambling Commission.

In March 2020, the UKGC made it mandatory for online gambling operators to participate in the self-exclusion scheme GamStop.

In October 2020, the Commission published the results of an investigation of BGO, GAN, and NetBet, three UK online gambling operators. The Commission concluded that in the period between September 2018 and March 2020 the operators did not make enough efforts to keep gamblers' safe and prevent money laundering.

In April 2021, Chief Executive Neil McArthur announced that he will step down as CEO of the Commission.

== Responsibilities ==
=== Aims and objectives ===
The Commission's stated aims are "to keep crime out of gambling, to ensure that gambling is conducted fairly and openly, and to protect children and vulnerable people". However, critics note its ADR process and default non-disclosure of complaints as often part of "standard procedure" contrasts directly with the validity of this claimed remit.

The Commission released a new 2018/19 business plan with the goals of improving industry standards, consumer protections and public protection from gambling related harm. From December 2020 through February 2021, the Commission invited public comment on improving the quality and timeliness of its statistics regarding problem gambling.

=== Licensing ===
The Commission issues licences to gambling operators, can levy fines and revoke licences, and is tasked with investigating and prosecuting illegal gambling. It is also responsible for advising national and local government on gambling-related issues.

==== Remote gambling ====
For remote gambling, the Commission issues licences to those operators whose remote gambling equipment is located in the territory of Great Britain. Whilst, those operators who wish to advertise their services in England, Wales, or Scotland, but are based outside the country, have to obtain a licence from the Gambling Commission following the passage of the Gambling (Licensing and Advertising) Act 2014. The 2014 Act changed the licensing requirements so that any company wishing to advertise gambling and take bets from consumers in England, Wales, or Scotland must hold a licence issued by the Gambling Commission. Previously, an operator in one of the whitelisted gambling jurisdictions could advertise their services in Great Britain without requiring a separate licence from the Commission. The proposals were opposed by the gambling industry, including the Gibraltar Betting and Gaming Association. They also regulate crypto gambling websites and mitigate the risk of money laundering through such sites.

=== Monitoring and regulation ===
The list of responsibilities of the Gambling Commission includes work to ensure that licencees act in accordance with the requirements imposed by the Gambling Act 2005 and other related regulations and standards. The Commission has the right to visit its licencees and examine their financial activities. As a result of this examination, specialists from the Gambling Commission can issue recommendations for amendments. Apart from such advice, supplementary licence conditions can be set or removed. In some cases, the Commission may take action to correct or avoid certain misconducts.

Apart from reviewing the activities of the licensed operators, the Commission is authorised to take regulatory actions against those licencees who breach the rules in some way. The range of actions that may need to be taken varies from issuing a warning to inflicting a fine on those who violate licence conditions. In situations where additional investigation is required, the licence can be revoked.

The Intelligence department of the Gambling Commission collects information about the illegal activities related to their field and conducts preliminary investigation to build a picture of the situation and inform senior management. They also collaborate with other UK organisations and the police in cases where suspicious betting or gambling activities are detected.

The list of operators and personal licence holders who have had a regulatory sanction imposed on them is published on the site of the Gambling Commission.

In July 2026, Sarah Fox, a senior civil servant from the Department for Digital, Culture, Media and Sport (DCMS), was announced as the new head of the Gambling Commission’s policy, research and statistics division.

==== Notable actions ====
In December 2016 the Gambling Commission fined Camelot Group £3 million for failing to verify a fraudulent National Lottery ticket that had been presented in 2009. The Commission found that Camelot had poor fraud prevention controls in place and that it had breached the terms of its licence. The case was subsequently investigated by police, who found that a Camelot employee who worked in Camelot's fraud department had conspired with a member of the public to claim a jackpot prize of £2.5 million using a bogus ticket.

In February 2018, the Commission fined British bookmaker William Hill £6.2 million for not protecting players after a series of systematic failures to prevent money laundering.

The Commission issued a £600,000 penalty to LeoVegas in May 2018 for producing misleading adverts to customers as well as several self-exclusion failings. The following month, in June 2018, the Commission fined 32Red £2 million for failing a problem gambler who had deposited £758,000 with 32Red over more than two years. 32Red had failed to check the customer, who had a net income of £2,150 per month, could afford the bets despite several previous regulatory rulings in this area.

On 31 July 2019 the Commission announced that Ladbrokes Coral would pay £5.9m for past failings in anti-money laundering and social responsibility. An investigation found that the companies failed to put in place effective safeguards to prevent consumers suffering gambling harm and against money laundering between November 2014 and October 2017.

In April 2023, significant changes to gambling regulations were proposed by the government, particularly targeting online slots. The following year in February 2024, the government introduced maximum stake limits for online slots. Adults aged 25 and over would face a maximum stake limit of £5 per spin, while those aged 18 to 24 would have a lower limit of 2 per spin.

In mid-2026, the Gambling Commission clarified that bookmakers should perform customer financial and mental health checks prior to a bet being placed, and they should not conduct these checks retrospectively and use them as justification to withhold payouts.

== Criticisms ==
The Gambling Commission has come under fire for not preventing the spread of Fixed odds betting terminals on the high street. Their spread is linked to the transfer of responsibility for planning permission for bookmakers moving from the Gambling Commission to local authorities.

In 2014, the UK-regulated online bookmaker Canbet went into receivership, owing millions to customers. The demise of this site raised questions of the ability of the Commission to protect UK customers from rogue traders, although overall responsibility for UK online regulation was only given to the UKGC in November 2014.

In September 2014, UK-regulated online bookmaker BetButler closed down, leaving a message on its website reading "The Board of BetButler Limited has been approached by a third party regulated gaming business to acquire the customer database, including all balances and pending withdrawal requests, of the business. This process will take some days to complete." Concerns were raised about pay out times and their financial state many months before this appeared. Again, the Gambling Commission have been criticised.

In July 2026, the Gambling Commission faced backlash for newly announced affordability and responsible gambling checks, which critics described as "rushed, flawed and hugely problematic".

== Charities ==
The UK Gambling Commission requires operators to contribute financially to organisations focused on research, prevention, and treatment of gambling-related harm. This directive has been in place since 1 January 2020, and is part of the Licence Conditions and Codes of Practice (LCCP) under code SR 3.1.1.

In January 2020, the Gambling Commission approved several organisations for these compulsory funding contributions, ensuring that operators direct their financial support to recognised entities working to mitigate gambling harms.

== See also ==
- Gaming Control Board
- Problem gambling
- Gambling in the United Kingdom
- History of gambling in the United Kingdom
- Lottery fraud
