= Sportingbet =

British online gambling operator

- Type: Subsidiary
- Industry: Gambling
- Founded: 1997; 29 years ago
- Headquarters: London, United Kingdom
- Key people: CEO; Kenneth Alexander
- Products: Sports betting Financial betting Poker (Paradise Poker); Casino (Paradise Casino); Games; Backgammon
- Revenue: £1,577.2 million (2009)
- Operating income: £21.9 million (2009)
- Net income: £12.4 million (2009)
- Owner: Entain plc
- Website: www.sportingbet.com

Sportingbet is a British online gambling operator, owned by Entain plc. The company was listed on the London Stock Exchange and was a constituent of the FTSE SmallCap Index prior to its acquisition by GVC Holdings.

== History ==
The company was founded by Mark Blandford in 1997. Sportingbet acquired Paradise Poker in October 2004. On 7 September 2006 Sportingbet reported that its then chairman, Peter Dicks, was detained in New York City on a Louisiana warrant while traveling in the United States on business unrelated to online gambling. Louisiana is one of the few states that has a specific law prohibiting gambling online. In March 2007, all Louisiana warrants involving the company were cancelled.

In October 2006, Sportingbet announced Paradise Poker would stop taking deposits from US customers, although most would be allowed to continue to play for another month. Additionally, Sportingbet sold all its US-facing sports betting and casino businesses, including Sportsbook.com and Sports.com, to a group of private investors for $1, and an assumption of $13.2 million in debts.

In February 2007, Sportingbet announced it was eliminating its Paradise Poker software and migrating players to its Sportingbet Poker platform. Prior to this, the two platforms had approximately the same number of players, but the Sportingbet platform had higher liquidity because that platform was part of a larger network. The brand name of Paradise Poker was retained.

In 2008, Netbet (Pty) Ltd, a company in South Africa, licensed the Sportingbet brand for online gambling in South Africa.

In October 2012, Sportingbet announced its board had agreed to preliminary terms for a £530 million takeover bid from UK bookmaker William Hill and Isle of Man-based GVC Holdings. Under the terms, Sportingbet's Australian and Spanish operations were bought by William Hill.

== Operations ==
Sportingbet operates local-focused sportsbooks, virtual games and casino sites, and the online poker cardroom, Paradise Poker. Overall, the company has over 2.5 million registered customers in 200 countries, who place over one million bets (casino, poker, sports and virtual games) per day.

Sportingbet operates several websites. The largest of these are wholly owned and operated by Sportingbet. They also use a system similar to a franchise, in which independent website operators use Sportingbet's centralised software, financial services, trading, and customer service under license. These web sites receive a cut of the profits their customers generate.

Sportingbet operates offices and call centres in the Republic of Ireland and Costa Rica. The PLC is located in Moorgate, London.

== Sponsorship ==
The company sponsored Premier League, Championship and League One football team Wolverhampton Wanderers from the 2009–10 season until the 2013–14 season. This link-up with a football club first began in January 2009, when Bulgarian football club Slavia Sofia announced a 3-year sponsoring deal. As a result, the logo of the company appeared on the club's shirts for the 2008–09, 2009–10 and 2010–11 seasons of the Bulgarian A PFG. Sportingbet also sponsored Steaua Bucuresti of Romania for the 2009–10 and 2010–11 seasons. The logo also appeared on Steaua Bucuresti II, Steaua's reserve team's shirt. Sportingbet also sponsored division 1 Victorian amateur football team Banyule FC for the 2010–2011 seasons.

=== Football ===
- (Brazil) Palmeiras (2025-present)
- (Greece) PAOK FC (2015–2018)
- (Romania) CFR Cluj (2017–2018)
- (Brazil) Série B (2022)
- Copa Libertadores (Brazil only) (2023–present)
- Copa Sudamericana (Brazil only) (2023–present)
