= EGaming Review =

British business magazine and website

- Categories: B2B magazine
- Company: Pageant Gaming Media Limited
- Country: UK
- Based in: London
- Website: egr.global

egaming review and EGRmagazine.com are related online gambling publishing brands covering online gambling industry news and regulation topics.

eGaming Review and EGRmagazine.com are owned by Pageant Gaming Media Limited along with four other sister brands— EGR North America, Marketing, Compliance and Technology.
