= Kambi Group =

Sports betting services industry

Kambi Group Plc
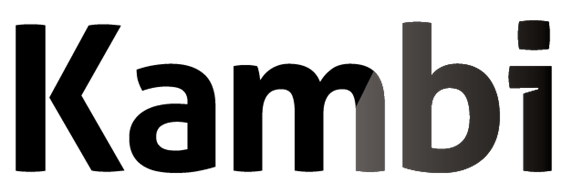
- Kambi Sportsbook
- Traded as: Stockholm First North: KAMBI
- Industry: Gambling
- Founded: 2010; 16 years ago
- Headquarters: Avenue 77, A4, Triq in-Negozju, Zone 3, Central Business District, Birkirkara, CBD 3010, Malta
- Number of locations: (8) Bucharest, London, Malta, Manila, Philadelphia, Stockholm, Sydney, Uppsala
- Key people: Werner Becher (CEO)
- Products: Online gambling and casinos, Software and associated services
- Number of employees: 1000+
- Website: www.kambi.com

Kambi Group Plc is a B2B provider for sports betting services to licensed B2C gambling operators. The company provides a software platform with front end user interface, odds compiling, customer intelligence and risk management. Kambi was established in 2010 as an independent operating subsidiary of Unibet to meet anticipated demand for B2B sports betting services.

Kambi Group is listed on First North at Nasdaq Stockholm under the symbol "KAMBI". The company is eCOGRA certified, with Redeye AB as certified advisor.

== History ==
On 19 May 2014, shareholders of Unibet Group plc approved the proposed spin-off of its B2B subsidiary Kambi Group Plc. The company's 95 per cent stake in the business was subsequently distributed to Unibet shareholders. Kambi Group Plc shares started trading on the NASDAQ OMX Stockholm First North on 2 June 2014. The share closed at SEK 34 on the first day of trading, giving the company a market valuation of SEK 1,011,200,700.

Since being listed, Kambi have grown from 80 people to over 800+ people with offices in Malta (HQ), Bucharest, London, Manila, Philadelphia, Stockholm and Sydney. In 2013, the online and mobile gambling operator 888 Holdings moved its sportsbook services to Kambi for its 888sport brand. In 2014 32Red selected Kambi as their sportsbook provider, and extended the contract in 2016. Also in 2016, LeoVegas signed an agreement with Kambi Sportsbook to enter the sports betting market. Following this announcement The Rank Group and Kambi enabled Rank's online casino brand Grosvenor to provide betting to its 1.7m UK customer base via mobile and desktop channels.

In June 2018, following the United States Supreme Court ruling that struck down PASPA, Kambi powered the launch of the DraftKings Sportsbook in New Jersey, and on 1 August 2018 it took what was reported as the first legal online sports wager placed through a mobile app in the United States.

In February 2018, Kambi made a strategic investment in virtual sports provider Virtus Sports. The investment saw the company take a 25% stake in the business and will coincide with the integration of 3D football, horse racing, greyhound and motorsports games into Kambi's sports betting portfolio.

In August 2021, Kambi acquired esports data company Abios.

In September 2022, it was announced Kambi had acquired the Copenhagen-headquartered digital B2B platform for the gambling industry, Shape Games for €38.5 million.

In 2024, co-founder Kristian Nylén stepped down after leading the company since 2010, and former Sportradar executive Werner Becher was appointed chief executive officer.

== Operations ==
Kambi employs over 800 staff across offices in its headquarters in Malta, with offices in Bucharest, Philadelphia, London, Manila, Sydney, Stockholm and Uppsala. Licensed in Alderney, Malta, Spain and the UK and certified in Alderney, Estonia, Denmark, Italy, Malta, Spain and the UK, Kambi currently provide their services to operators in Europe, Asia and Latin America and has seen revenue increase by 70% in 2014, 32% in 2015 and 17% in 2016.

The company provides a software platform with front end user interface, odds compiling, customer intelligence and risk management. In 2017, they partnered with Bulgaria's National Lottery in order to provide the latter with software for their 7777.bg brand.

== Partnerships ==
On 27 July 2016, Kambi announced an agreement with the Spanish international gaming group R Franco to provide its omni-channel service. Kambi Group plc partnered with Novomatic Lottery Solutions on 18 October 2016 to provide a powerful full-service gaming solution to government regulated lotteries. 24 November 2016 also saw Kambi sign an agreement with Apuestas Internacionales, S.A. de C.V. for the provision of multi-channel sports betting service for the brand "PlayCity". 7 February 2017 saw Kambi sign an agreement with Greentube Novomatic Interactive.

In August 2021, Kambi entered a multi-year partnership with Bahamas-based operator Island Luck. As part of the deal Kambi will become Island Luck's official sports betting partner.

In December 2021, Kambi entered a multi-year partnership with Affinity Interactive to provide them access to Kambi's proprietary software platform.

In February 2022, Kambi extended their partnership with Kindred until 2026. The relationship was affected by Kindred's 2023 decision to develop an in-house sportsbook, and after Kindred's 2024 acquisition by La Française des Jeux the cooperation continued through Kambi's Odds Feed+ product rather than its full platform.

== Awards ==
At the Global Gaming Awards London 2021, Kambi won the "Online Sports Betting Supplier" award.

Kambi was awarded the Online Sports Betting Supplier honour at the 2023 Global Gaming Awards.

== Memberships ==
Kambi is a member of the following industry bodies.

- World Lottery Association member
- European Lottery Association member
- CIBELAE association member
