= 2017–18 EFL Championship =

EFL Championship
- Season: 2017–18
- Champions: Wolverhampton Wanderers; 2nd Championship title 4th 2nd tier title
- Promoted: Wolverhampton Wanderers; Cardiff City; Fulham
- Relegated: Barnsley; Burton Albion; Sunderland
- Matches: 552
- Goals: 1,409 (2.55 per match)
- Top goalscorer: Matěj Vydra (Derby County) (21 goals)
- Biggest home win: Fulham 6–0 Burton Albion (20 January 2018)
- Biggest away win: Burton Albion 0–5 Hull City (10 April 2018)
- Highest scoring: Bristol City 5–5 Hull City (21 April 2018)
- Longest winning run: 8 matches Cardiff City
- Longest unbeaten run: 23 matches Fulham
- Longest winless run: 16 matches Sunderland
- Longest losing run: 8 matches Bolton Wanderers
- Highest attendance: 41,745; Aston Villa 1–1 Derby County (28 April 2018)
- Lowest attendance: 2,750; Burton Albion 1–3 Reading (30 January 2018)
- Total attendance: 11,314,143
- Average attendance: 20,496

The 2017–18 EFL Championship (referred to as the Sky Bet Championship for sponsorship reasons) was the second season of the EFL Championship under its current name, and the twenty-sixth season under its current league structure.

This season notably saw Sunderland become the first English team to be relegated in successive seasons from the top division to the third tier since the champions Wolverhampton Wanderers in 2012 and 2013, and only the third team to do so since the top division was relaunched as the Premier League in 1992.

== Team changes ==
The following teams had changed division since the 2016–17 season.

=== To Championship ===
Promoted from League One

- Sheffield United
- Bolton Wanderers
- Millwall

Relegated from Premier League

- Hull City
- Middlesbrough
- Sunderland

=== From Championship ===
Relegated to League One

- Blackburn Rovers
- Wigan Athletic
- Rotherham United

Promoted to Premier League

- Newcastle United
- Brighton & Hove Albion
- Huddersfield Town

== Stadiums ==
Locations of the 2017–18 Football League Championship teams
Greater London Championship football clubs

Team	Location	Stadium	Capacity
Aston Villa	Birmingham	Villa Park	42,790
Barnsley	Barnsley	Oakwell	23,009
Birmingham City	Birmingham	St Andrew's	30,015
Bolton Wanderers	Bolton	Macron Stadium	28,723
Brentford	London (Brentford)	Griffin Park	12,300
Bristol City	Bristol	Ashton Gate	27,000
Burton Albion	Burton upon Trent	Pirelli Stadium	6,912
Cardiff City	Cardiff	Cardiff City Stadium	33,300
Derby County	Derby	Pride Park Stadium	33,600
Fulham	London (Fulham)	Craven Cottage	25,700
Hull City	Kingston upon Hull	KCOM Stadium	25,586
Ipswich Town	Ipswich	Portman Road	30,300
Leeds United	Leeds	Elland Road	37,890
Middlesbrough	Middlesbrough	Riverside Stadium	34,742
Millwall	London (South Bermondsey)	The Den	20,146
Norwich City	Norwich	Carrow Road	27,220
Nottingham Forest	Nottingham	City Ground	30,445
Preston North End	Preston	Deepdale	23,408
Queens Park Rangers	London (Shepherd's Bush)	Loftus Road	18,439
Reading	Reading	Madejski Stadium	24,161
Sheffield United	Sheffield	Bramall Lane	32,702
Sheffield Wednesday	Sheffield	Hillsborough Stadium	39,752
Sunderland	Sunderland	Stadium of Light	49,000
Wolverhampton Wanderers	Wolverhampton	Molineux	31,700

== Personnel and sponsoring ==
Team	Manager	Captain	Kit manufacturer	Sponsor
Aston Villa	(England) Steve Bruce	(England) John Terry	Under Armour	Unibet
Barnsley	(Portugal) José Morais	(Ghana) Andy Yiadom^{3}	Puma	C.K. Beckett
Birmingham City	(England) Garry Monk	(England) Michael Morrison	Adidas	888sport
Bolton Wanderers	(England) Phil Parkinson	(England) Darren Pratley	Macron	Betfred
Brentford	(England) Dean Smith	(Republic of Ireland) John Egan	Adidas	LeoVegas
Bristol City	(England) Lee Johnson	(Australia) Bailey Wright	Bristol Sport	Lancer Scott
Burton Albion	(England) Nigel Clough	(England) Jake Buxton	TAG	Tempobet
Cardiff City	(England) Neil Warnock	(England) Sean Morrison	Adidas	Visit Malaysia
Derby County	(England) Gary Rowett	(England) Curtis Davies	Umbro	Avon Tyres
Fulham	(Serbia) Slaviša Jokanović	(Scotland) Tom Cairney	Adidas	Grosvenor Casinos
Hull City	(England) Nigel Adkins	(England) Michael Dawson	Umbro	SportPesa
Ipswich Town	(England) Paul Hurst	(England) Luke Chambers	Adidas	Marcus Evans
Leeds United	(England) Paul Heckingbottom	(Scotland) Liam Cooper	Kappa	32Red
Middlesbrough	(Wales) Tony Pulis	(England) Grant Leadbitter	Adidas	Ramsdens Currency
Millwall	(England) Neil Harris	(Wales) Steve Morison	Erreà	DCS Roofing
Norwich City	(Germany) Daniel Farke	(Portugal) Ivo Pinto^{2}	Erreà	LeoVegas
Nottingham Forest	(Spain) Aitor Karanka	(England) Chris Cohen	Adidas	888sport
Preston North End	(Scotland) Alex Neil	(Republic of Ireland) Greg Cunningham	Nike	Tempobet
Queens Park Rangers	(England) Ian Holloway	(England) Nedum Onuoha	Erreà	Royal Panda
Reading	(England) Paul Clement	(England) Liam Moore	Puma	Carabao
Sheffield United	(England) Chris Wilder	(England) Billy Sharp	Adidas	Teletext Holidays
Sheffield Wednesday	(Netherlands) Jos Luhukay	(Netherlands) Glenn Loovens	Elev8	Chansiri
Sunderland	(Scotland) Jack Ross	(England) Lee Cattermole	Adidas	Dafabet
Wolverhampton Wanderers	(Portugal) Nuno Espírito Santo	(England) Danny Batth	Puma	The Money Shop

- ^{1} According to current revision of List of current Premier League and English Football League managers.
- ^{2} Norwich captain Russell Martin was on loan at Rangers, therefore Ivo Pinto was the stand-in captain for the remainder of the season.
- ^{3} Barnsley first team Captain was Angus MacDonald from August 2017 to January 2018. MacDonald left Barnsley in January 2018, after signing a new contract with Hull City. Adam Davies named as Barnsley's first team Vice-Captain in August 2017. In February 2018, Barnsley confirmed Andy Yiadom as the first-team captain on the club's official website.

== Managerial changes ==
Team	Outgoing manager	Manner of departure	Date of vacancy	Position in table	Incoming manager	Date of appointment
Norwich City	(Scotland) Alan Irvine	End of caretaker spell	7 May 2017	Pre-season	(Germany) Daniel Farke	25 May 2017
Middlesbrough	(England) Steve Agnew	End of caretaker spell	21 May 2017	Pre-season	(England) Garry Monk	9 June 2017
Sunderland	(Scotland) David Moyes	Resigned	22 May 2017	Pre-season	(England) Simon Grayson	29 June 2017
Leeds United	(England) Garry Monk	Resigned	25 May 2017	Pre-season	(Denmark) Thomas Christiansen	15 June 2017
Hull City	(Portugal) Marco Silva	Resigned	25 May 2017	Pre-season	(Russia) Leonid Slutsky	9 June 2017
Wolverhampton Wanderers	(Scotland) Paul Lambert	Mutual consent	30 May 2017	Pre-season	(Portugal) Nuno Espírito Santo	31 May 2017
Preston North End	(England) Simon Grayson	Signed by Sunderland	29 June 2017	Pre-season	(Scotland) Alex Neil	4 July 2017
Birmingham City	(England) Harry Redknapp	Sacked	16 September 2017	23rd	(England) Steve Cotterill	29 September 2017
Sunderland	(England) Simon Grayson	Sacked	31 October 2017	22nd	(Wales) Chris Coleman	17 November 2017
Hull City	(Russia) Leonid Slutsky	Mutual consent	3 December 2017	20th	(England) Nigel Adkins	7 December 2017
Middlesbrough	(England) Garry Monk	Sacked	23 December 2017	9th	(Wales) Tony Pulis	26 December 2017
Sheffield Wednesday	(Portugal) Carlos Carvalhal	Mutual consent	24 December 2017	15th	(Netherlands) Jos Luhukay	5 January 2018
Nottingham Forest	(England) Mark Warburton	Sacked	31 December 2017	14th	(Spain) Aitor Karanka	8 January 2018
Leeds United	(Denmark) Thomas Christiansen	Sacked	4 February 2018	10th	(England) Paul Heckingbottom	6 February 2018
Barnsley	(England) Paul Heckingbottom	Signed by Leeds United	6 February 2018	21st	(Portugal) José Morais	16 February 2018
Birmingham City	(England) Steve Cotterill	Sacked	3 March 2018	22nd	(England) Garry Monk	4 March 2018
Reading	(Netherlands) Jaap Stam	Sacked	21 March 2018	18th	(England) Paul Clement	23 March 2018
Ipswich Town	(Republic of Ireland) Mick McCarthy	Resigned	10 April 2018	12th	(England) Paul Hurst	30 May 2018
Sunderland	(Wales) Chris Coleman	Sacked	29 April 2018	24th	(Scotland) Jack Ross	25 May 2018

== League table ==
Pos	Team	Pld	W	D	L	GF	GA	GD	Pts	Promotion, qualification or relegation
1	Wolverhampton Wanderers (C, P)	46	30	9	7	82	39	+43	99	Promotion to the Premier League
2	Cardiff City (P)	46	27	9	10	69	39	+30	90	Promotion to the Premier League
3	Fulham (O, P)	46	25	13	8	79	46	+33	88	Qualification for Championship play-offs (Note: Four teams play for one spot and promotion to the Premier League.)
4	Aston Villa	46	24	11	11	72	42	+30	83	Qualification for Championship play-offs
5	Middlesbrough	46	22	10	14	67	45	+22	76	Qualification for Championship play-offs
6	Derby County	46	20	15	11	70	48	+22	75	Qualification for Championship play-offs
7	Preston North End	46	19	16	11	57	46	+11	73	
8	Millwall	46	19	15	12	56	45	+11	72	
9	Brentford	46	18	15	13	62	52	+10	69	
10	Sheffield United	46	20	9	17	62	55	+7	69	
11	Bristol City	46	17	16	13	67	58	+9	67	
12	Ipswich Town	46	17	9	20	57	60	−3	60	
13	Leeds United	46	17	9	20	59	64	−5	60	
14	Norwich City	46	15	15	16	49	60	−11	60	
15	Sheffield Wednesday	46	14	15	17	59	60	−1	57	
16	Queens Park Rangers	46	15	11	20	58	70	−12	56	
17	Nottingham Forest	46	15	8	23	51	65	−14	53	
18	Hull City	46	11	16	19	70	70	0	49	
19	Birmingham City	46	13	7	26	38	68	−30	46	
20	Reading	46	10	14	22	48	70	−22	44	
21	Bolton Wanderers	46	10	13	23	39	74	−35	43	
22	Barnsley (R)	46	9	14	23	48	72	−24	41	Relegation to EFL League One
23	Burton Albion (R)	46	10	11	25	38	81	−43	41	Relegation to EFL League One
24	Sunderland (R)	46	7	16	23	52	80	−28	37	Relegation to EFL League One

Source: English Football League
Rules for classification: 1) Points; 2) Goal difference; 3) Number of goals scored
(C) Champions; (O) Play-off winners; (P) Promoted; (R) Relegated

== Play-offs ==
Semi-finals
3	Fulham	0	2	2
6	Derby County	1	0	1
4	Aston Villa	1	0	1
5	Middlesbrough	0	0	0

Final
3	Fulham	1
4	Aston Villa	0

== Results ==
Home \ Away	AST	BAR	BIR	BOL	BRE	BRI	BRT	CAR	DER	FUL	HUL	IPS	LEE	MID	MIL	NOR	NOT	PNE	QPR	REA	SHU	SHW	SUN	WOL
Aston Villa	—	3–1	2–0	1–0	0–0	5–0	3–2	1–0	1–1	2–1	1–1	2–0	1–0	0–0	0–0	4–2	2–1	1–1	1–3	3–0	2–2	1–2	2–1	4–1
Barnsley	0–3	—	2–0	2–2	2–0	2–2	1–2	0–1	0–3	1–3	0–1	1–2	0–2	2–2	0–2	1–1	2–1	0–0	1–1	1–1	3–2	1–1	3–0	0–0
Birmingham City	0–0	0–2	—	0–0	0–2	2–1	1–1	1–0	0–3	3–1	3–0	1–0	1–0	0–1	0–1	0–2	1–0	1–3	1–2	0–2	2–1	1–0	3–1	0–1
Bolton Wanderers	1–0	3–1	0–1	—	0–3	1–0	0–1	2–0	1–2	1–1	1–0	1–1	2–3	0–3	0–2	2–1	3–2	1–3	1–1	2–2	0–1	2–1	1–0	0–4
Brentford	2–1	0–0	5–0	2–0	—	2–2	1–1	1–3	1–1	3–1	1–1	1–0	3–1	1–1	1–0	0–1	3–4	1–1	2–1	1–1	1–1	2–0	3–3	0–0
Bristol City	1–1	3–1	3–1	2–0	0–1	—	0–0	2–1	4–1	1–1	5–5	1–0	0–3	2–1	0–0	0–1	2–1	1–2	2–0	2–0	2–3	4–0	3–3	1–2
Burton Albion	0–4	2–4	2–1	2–0	0–2	0–0	—	0–1	3–1	2–1	0–5	1–2	1–2	1–1	0–1	0–0	0–0	1–2	1–3	1–3	1–3	1–1	0–2	0–4
Cardiff City	3–0	2–1	3–2	2–0	2–0	1–0	3–1	—	0–0	2–4	1–0	3–1	3–1	1–0	0–0	3–1	2–1	0–1	2–1	0–0	2–0	1–1	4–0	0–1
Derby County	2–0	4–1	1–1	3–0	3–0	0–0	1–0	3–1	—	1–2	5–0	0–1	2–2	1–2	3–0	1–1	2–0	1–0	2–0	2–4	1–1	2–0	1–4	0–2
Fulham	2–0	2–1	1–0	1–1	1–1	0–2	6–0	1–1	1–1	—	2–1	4–1	2–0	1–1	1–0	1–1	2–0	2–2	2–2	1–0	3–0	0–1	2–1	2–0
Hull City	0–0	1–1	6–1	4–0	3–2	2–3	4–1	0–2	0–0	2–2	—	2–2	0–0	1–3	1–2	4–3	2–3	1–2	4–0	0–0	1–0	0–1	1–1	2–3
Ipswich Town	0–4	1–0	1–0	2–0	2–0	1–3	0–0	0–1	1–2	0–2	0–3	—	1–0	2–2	2–2	0–1	4–2	3–0	0–0	2–0	0–0	2–2	5–2	0–1
Leeds United	1–1	2–1	2–0	2–1	1–0	2–2	5–0	1–4	1–2	0–0	1–0	3–2	—	2–1	3–4	1–0	0–0	0–0	2–0	0–1	1–2	1–2	1–1	0–3
Middlesbrough	0–1	3–1	2–0	2–0	2–2	2–1	2–0	0–1	0–3	0–1	3–1	2–0	3–0	—	2–0	0–1	2–0	0–0	3–2	2–1	1–0	0–0	1–0	1–2
Millwall	1–0	1–3	2–0	1–1	1–0	2–0	0–1	1–1	0–0	0–3	0–0	3–4	1–0	2–1	—	4–0	2–0	1–1	1–0	2–1	3–1	2–1	1–1	2–2
Norwich City	3–1	1–1	1–0	0–0	1–2	0–0	0–0	0–2	1–2	0–2	1–1	1–1	2–1	1–0	2–1	—	0–0	1–1	2–0	3–2	1–2	3–1	1–3	0–2
Nottingham Forest	0–1	3–0	2–1	3–2	0–1	0–0	2–0	0–2	0–0	1–3	0–2	2–1	0–2	2–1	1–0	1–0	—	0–3	4–0	1–1	2–1	0–3	0–1	1–2
Preston North End	0–2	1–1	1–1	0–0	2–3	2–1	2–1	3–0	0–1	1–2	2–1	0–1	3–1	2–3	0–0	0–0	1–1	—	1–0	1–0	1–0	1–0	2–2	1–1
Queens Park Rangers	1–2	1–0	3–1	2–0	2–2	1–1	0–0	2–1	1–1	1–2	2–1	2–1	1–3	0–3	2–2	4–1	2–5	1–2	—	2–0	1–0	4–2	1–0	2–1
Reading	2–1	3–0	0–2	1–1	0–1	0–1	1–2	2–2	3–3	1–1	1–1	0–4	2–2	0–2	0–2	1–2	3–1	1–0	1–0	—	1–3	0–0	2–2	0–2
Sheffield United	0–1	1–0	1–1	0–1	1–0	1–2	2–0	1–1	3–1	4–5	4–1	1–0	2–1	2–1	1–1	0–1	0–0	0–1	2–1	2–1	—	0–0	3–0	2–0
Sheffield Wednesday	2–4	1–1	1–3	1–1	2–1	0–0	0–3	0–0	2–0	0–1	2–2	1–2	3–0	1–2	2–1	5–1	3–1	4–1	1–1	3–0	2–4	—	1–1	0–1
Sunderland	0–3	0–1	1–1	3–3	0–2	1–2	1–2	1–2	1–1	1–0	1–0	0–2	0–2	3–3	2–2	1–1	0–1	0–2	1–1	1–3	1–2	1–3	—	3–0
Wolverhampton Wanderers	2–0	2–1	2–0	5–1	3–0	3–3	3–1	1–2	2–0	2–0	2–2	1–0	4–1	1–0	1–0	2–2	0–2	3–2	2–1	3–0	3–0	0–0	0–0	—

Source: BBC Sport
Legend: Blue = home team win; Yellow = draw; Red = away team win.
For upcoming matches, an "a" indicates there is an article about the rivalry between the two participants.

== Top scorers ==
Rank	Player	Club	Goals
1	(Czech Republic) Matěj Vydra	Derby County	21
2	(England) Lewis Grabban	Sunderland/Aston Villa	20
3	(Jamaica) Bobby Reid	Bristol City	19
3	(England) Leon Clarke	Sheffield United	19
5	(Portugal) Diogo Jota	Wolverhampton Wanderers	17
6	(England) Martyn Waghorn	Ipswich Town	16
7	(England) Ryan Sessegnon	Fulham	15
7	(Democratic Republic of the Congo) Britt Assombalonga	Middlesbrough	15
9	(England) James Maddison	Norwich City	14
9	(Ghana) Albert Adomah	Aston Villa	14
9	(England) Jarrod Bowen	Hull City	14

== Hat-tricks ==
Player	For	Against	Result	Date
(Uruguay) Abel Hernández	Hull City	Burton Albion	4–1 (H)	12 August 2017
(Republic of Ireland) Conor Hourihane	Aston Villa	Norwich City	4–2 (H)	19 August 2017
(England) Kieran Dowell	Nottingham Forest	Hull City	3–2 (A)	28 October 2017
(England) Leon Clarke^{4}	Sheffield United	Hull City	4–1 (H)	4 November 2017
(England) Ryan Sessegnon	Fulham	Sheffield United	5–4 (A)	21 November 2017
(England) Leon Clarke	Sheffield United	Fulham	4–5 (H)	21 November 2017
(Czech Republic) Matěj Vydra	Derby County	Middlesbrough	3–0 (A)	25 November 2017
(Jamaica) Kemar Roofe	Leeds United	Queens Park Rangers	3–1 (A)	9 December 2017
(England) Patrick Bamford	Middlesbrough	Leeds United	3–0 (H)	2 March 2018
(Jamaica) Bobby Reid	Bristol City	Sheffield Wednesday	4–0 (H)	3 March 2018
(England) James Maddison	Norwich City	Hull City	3–4 (A)	10 March 2018
(Kosovo) Atdhe Nuhiu	Sheffield Wednesday	Norwich City	5–1 (H)	6 May 2018

^{4} Player scored 4 goals

== Monthly awards ==
Month	Manager of the Month		Player of the Month		Reference
Month	Manager	Club	Player	Club	Reference
August	(England) Neil Warnock	Cardiff City	(Guatemala) Nathaniel Mendez-Laing	Cardiff City	
September	(England) Lee Johnson	Bristol City	(England) Aden Flint	Bristol City	
October	(England) Gary Rowett	Derby County	(Brazil) Léo Bonatini	Wolverhampton Wanderers	
November	(Portugal) Nuno Espírito Santo	Wolverhampton Wanderers	(England) Leon Clarke	Sheffield United	
December	(England) Gary Rowett	Derby County	(England) Scott Carson	Derby County	
January	(England) Steve Bruce	Aston Villa	(England) Ryan Sessegnon	Fulham	
February	(England) Neil Warnock	Cardiff City	(Scotland) Oli McBurnie	Barnsley	
March	(England) Neil Warnock	Cardiff City	(Serbia) Aleksandar Mitrović	Fulham	
April	(Serbia) Slaviša Jokanović	Fulham	(Serbia) Aleksandar Mitrović	Fulham	

== Attendances ==
Team	Stadium	Capacity	Average	Minimum	Maximum	Percentage Full
Aston Villa	Villa Park	42,790	32,097	26,631	41,745	75%
Barnsley	Oakwell	23,009	13,704	10,920	17,163	60%
Birmingham City	St Andrew's	30,015	21,042	18,301	27,608	70%
Bolton Wanderers	Macron Stadium	28,723	15,887	13,113	21,097	55%
Brentford	Griffin Park	12,300	10,234	7,957	12,367	83%
Bristol City	Ashton Gate	27,000	20,953	17,203	25,540	78%
Burton Albion	Pirelli Stadium	6,912	4,645	2,750	6,535	67%
Cardiff City	Cardiff City Stadium	33,300	20,164	15,951	32,478	61%
Derby County	Pride Park Stadium	33,600	27,175	23,296	31,196	81%
Fulham	Craven Cottage	25,700	19,896	15,792	24,547	77%
Hull City	KCOM Stadium	25,404	15,622	13,524	18,026	61%
Ipswich Town	Portman Road	30,300	16,271	13,061	24,928	54%
Leeds United	Elland Road	37,890	31,521	26,434	35,377	83%
Middlesbrough	Riverside Stadium	34,742	25,544	22,848	29,443	74%
Millwall	The Den	20,146	13,368	9,817	17,617	66%
Norwich City	Carrow Road	27,220	25,785	21,167	27,100	95%
Nottingham Forest	City Ground	30,445	24,680	20,596	29,106	81%
Preston North End	Deepdale	23,408	13,774	10,796	18,570	59%
Queens Park Rangers	Loftus Road	18,439	13,928	11,488	16,934	76%
Reading	Madejski Stadium	24,161	16,656	6,769	21,771	69%
Sheffield United	Bramall Lane	32,702	26,854	24,409	31,120	82%
Sheffield Wednesday	Hillsborough	39,752	25,995	22,733	32,839	65%
Sunderland	Stadium of Light	49,000	27,635	24,894	31,237	56%
Wolverhampton	Molineux	31,700	28,298	23,045	30,239	89%
