= Roxy Palace =

British online gambling company

- Type: Private
- Industry: Online gambling products = Online casino
- Founded: 2002
- Defunct: 2020
- Headquarters: London, UK
- Key people: –
- Number of employees: 25
- Website: www.roxypalace.com

Roxy Palace was a British online gaming company licensed in the UK and Gibraltar. The business reported net revenues of £10.1 million with a gross profit of £3.4m for 2014.

Roxy Palace was founded in 2002 and has customers in 6 different countries with a membership of some 230,000 players world-wide. The casino uses the Microgaming platform and offers various casino products, including slots, blackjack, and roulette.

In July 2015, Roxy Palace was acquired by casino group 32Red for a total consideration of £8.4 million. 32Red now owns the Roxy Palace database of players, all of their intellectual property and other assets associated with the brand. In June 2015, 32 Red PLC reported that 42% of revenues are being driven from a mobile device. The brand was ended in 2020.

== Services ==
The Roxy Palace site offers players a £350 welcome bonus upon sign-up and making a real money deposit. The Roxy Palace Player's Club awards points for every bet placed on any of the slot or table games. These points can then be used to purchase cash bonuses and more. Roxy Palace is also available for mobile users and is compatible with iPhone, Android, and Blackberry mobile devices. There is also a support centre that is open 24/7.

== Growth ==
In 2005, Roxy Palace Casino extended its product offering by adding another casino to its portfolio. Vegas Splendido was launched, and in its first year of operation, it won the title of Best New Casino. The casino later diversified into international markets and its name was changed to Casino Splendido. Both Roxy Palace and Casino Splendido are eCogra certified.

Roxy Palace has broadened its scope in recent years to operate in various language markets and offers fully translated software and support in those languages. The casino extended its operations in the French and Italian markets and later expanded its offering to include German and Dutch languages. Casino Splendido was introduced in English, French and Italian, and later added German, Spanish, Swedish and Portuguese to its offering. As of November 2015, Roxy Palace caters to the UK, German, Italian, Swedish, and Canadian markets.

== Casino Closure ==
Kindred Group, who acquired Roxy Palace in 2016 as part of their acquisition of 32Red plc, confirmed the closure of Roxy Palace on 30 November 2020.

== See also ==
- Online casino
