= Portuguese motorcycle Grand Prix =

Motorcycle race held in Portugal

Portuguese Grand Prix

Grand Prix motorcycle racing
- Venue: Algarve International Circuit (2020–present); Circuito do Estoril (2000–2012); Circuito del Jarama, Spain (1987)
- First race: 1987
- Most wins (rider): Valentino Rossi (5)
- Most wins (manufacturer): Aprilia (14)

The Portuguese motorcycle Grand Prix is a motorcycling event that is part of the FIM Grand Prix motorcycle racing season.

== History ==
The event was first held in 1987 at the Jarama circuit in Spain. The reason for this was because the main Portuguese circuit at the time, the Circuito do Estoril, was not yet ready to be used for motorcycle racing. However, Portugal still wanted to host a round in the championship that year, and so opted to use the Jarama circuit until their own was ready for use. In 1988, a second race was held at the new Jerez circuit which was also located in Spain. The original plan was to host the race in Portugal at the Estoril circuit, but Jerez was chosen instead. The race was also named 'EXPO '92', referring to the expo of a similar name held at the Spanish city of Seville that year. This makes Portugal the only country to host multiple grands prix under Portuguese flag and name, despite the locations of the venues not being located in the country itself.

In 2000, Grand Prix motorcycle racing returned to Portugal after the Estoril Circuit was homologated for international motorcycle racing. This was the third time Portugal hosted a grand prix, but only the first time a race was held in the country itself. Estoril continued to host the Portuguese round until 2012, where it was confirmed for the final time after the owners of the Estoril circuit and the Portuguese government came to an agreement. In 2013 however, the Portuguese round was dropped in favour of the Circuit of the Americas in the United States.

In the wake of the COVID-19 pandemic, the Portuguese Grand Prix returned as the season finale on an altered calendar in the 2020 MotoGP World Championship. The venue chosen to host the round was the Algarve International Circuit, which has been a reserve circuit since 2017. The race was held with no spectators after a lack of social distancing on the grandstands at the Formula 1 race held one month before. In 2021, the originally one-off race was brought back as the third round of the season. The race was also held in 2022. On 2 August 2022, it was announced that Portuguese Grand Prix would be the season-opener event between 24–26 March.

In the 2024 season, Portugal hosted its first ever MotoE race with the 2024 MotoE World Championship as the season opener - making them the eight country to host a MotoE World Championship.

== Official names and sponsors ==
- 1987: Gran Premio Marlboro de Portugal (only in name, the race was held in Jarama, Spain)
- 2000–2004: Grande Prémio Marlboro de Portugal
- 2005: betandwin.com Grande Prémio Portugal
- 2006–2009: bwin.com Grande Prémio de Portugal
- 2010–2011: bwin Grande Prémio de Portugal
- 2012: Grande Prémio de Portugal Circuito Estoril (no official sponsor)
- 2020: Grande Prémio MEO de Portugal
- 2021: Grande Prémio 888 de Portugal
- 2022–2024: Grande Prémio Tissot de Portugal
- 2025: Qatar Airways Grand Prix of Portugal
- 2026: Repsol Grand Prix of Portugal

== Formerly used circuits ==
Circuito del Jarama, used in 1987.

The Autódromo do Estoril, used from 2000 to 2012.

== Winners ==
=== Multiple winners (riders) ===
# Wins	Rider	Wins	
# Wins	Rider	Category	Years won
5	(Italy) Valentino Rossi	MotoGP	2002, 2003, 2004, 2007
5	(Italy) Valentino Rossi	500cc	2001
3	(Spain) Toni Elías	MotoGP	2006
3	(Spain) Toni Elías	250cc	2003, 2004
3	(Spain) Álvaro Bautista	250cc	2007, 2008
3	(Spain) Álvaro Bautista	125cc	2006
3	(Spain) Jorge Lorenzo	MotoGP	2008, 2009, 2010
2	(Japan) Daijiro Kato	250cc	2000, 2001
2	(Germany) Stefan Bradl	Moto2	2010, 2011
2	(Australia) Casey Stoner	MotoGP	2012
2	(Australia) Casey Stoner	250cc	2005
2	(Spain) Marc Márquez	Moto2	2012
2	(Spain) Marc Márquez	125cc	2010
2	(Spain) Raúl Fernández	Moto2	2021
2	(Spain) Raúl Fernández	Moto3	2020
2	(France) Fabio Quartararo	MotoGP	2021, 2022
2	(Spain) Pedro Acosta	Moto2	2023
2	(Spain) Pedro Acosta	Moto3	2021
2	(Spain) Daniel Holgado	Moto3	2023, 2024
2	(Spain) Máximo Quiles	Moto3	2025, 2026
2	(Italy) Marco Bezzecchi	MotoGP	2025, 2026

=== Multiple winners (manufacturers) ===
# Wins	Manufacturer	Wins	
# Wins	Manufacturer	Category	Years won
14	(Italy) Aprilia	MotoGP	2025, 2026
14	(Italy) Aprilia	250cc	2002, 2003, 2005, 2007, 2008
14	(Italy) Aprilia	125cc	2002, 2003, 2004, 2006, 2007, 2008, 2011
13	(Japan) Honda	MotoGP	2002, 2003, 2005, 2006, 2011, 2012
13	(Japan) Honda	500cc	2001
13	(Japan) Honda	250cc	1987, 2000, 2001, 2004, 2006
13	(Japan) Honda	125cc	2000
9	(Japan) Yamaha	MotoGP	2004, 2007, 2008, 2009, 2010, 2021, 2022
9	(Japan) Yamaha	500cc	1987, 2000
8	(Austria) KTM	MotoGP	2020
8	(Austria) KTM	Moto3	2012, 2020, 2021, 2023, 2025, 2026
8	(Austria) KTM	125cc	2005
8	(Germany) Kalex	Moto2	2011, 2020, 2021, 2022, 2023, 2024, 2025, 2026
6	(Italy) Ducati	MotoGP	2023, 2024
6	(Italy) Ducati	MotoE	2024 Race 1, 2024 Race 2, 2025 Race 1, 2025 Race 2
3	(Spain) Derbi	125cc	2009, 2010
3	(Spain) Derbi	80cc	1987
2	(Italy) Gilera	250cc	2009
2	(Italy) Gilera	125cc	2001
2	(Switzerland) Suter	Moto2	2010, 2012
2	(Spain) GasGas	Moto3	2022, 2024

=== By year ===
Year	Track	Moto3		Moto2		MotoGP		Report
Year	Track	Rider	Manufacturer	Rider	Manufacturer	Rider	Manufacturer	Report
2026	Algarve	(Spain) Máximo Quiles	KTM	(Spain) Daniel Muñoz	Kalex	(Italy) Marco Bezzecchi	Aprilia	Report

Year	Track	MotoE				Moto3		Moto2		MotoGP		Report
Year	Track	Race 1		Race 2		Moto3		Moto2		MotoGP		Report
Year	Track	Rider	Manufacturer	Rider	Manufacturer	Rider	Manufacturer	Rider	Manufacturer	Rider	Manufacturer	Report
2025	Algarve	(Italy) Alessandro Zaccone	Ducati	(Spain) Óscar Gutiérrez	Ducati	(Spain) Máximo Quiles	KTM	(Brazil) Diogo Moreira	Kalex	(Italy) Marco Bezzecchi	Aprilia	Report
2024	Algarve	(Italy) Nicholas Spinelli	Ducati	(Italy) Mattia Casadei	Ducati	(Spain) Daniel Holgado	GasGas	(Spain) Arón Canet	Kalex	(Spain) Jorge Martín	Ducati	Report

Year	Track	Moto3		Moto2		MotoGP		Report
Year	Track	Rider	Manufacturer	Rider	Manufacturer	Rider	Manufacturer	Report
2023	Algarve	(Spain) Daniel Holgado	KTM	(Spain) Pedro Acosta	Kalex	(Italy) Francesco Bagnaia	Ducati	Report
2022	Algarve	(Spain) Sergio García	GasGas	(United States) Joe Roberts	Kalex	(France) Fabio Quartararo	Yamaha	Report
2021	Algarve	(Spain) Pedro Acosta	KTM	(Spain) Raúl Fernández	Kalex	(France) Fabio Quartararo	Yamaha	Report
2020	Algarve	(Spain) Raúl Fernández	KTM	(Australia) Remy Gardner	Kalex	(Portugal) Miguel Oliveira	KTM	Report
2012	Estoril	(Germany) Sandro Cortese	KTM	(Spain) Marc Márquez	Suter	(Australia) Casey Stoner	Honda	Report
Year	Track	125cc		Moto2		MotoGP		Report
Year	Track	Rider	Manufacturer	Rider	Manufacturer	Rider	Manufacturer	Report
2011	Estoril	(Spain) Nicolás Terol	Aprilia	(Germany) Stefan Bradl	Kalex	(Spain) Dani Pedrosa	Honda	Report
2010	Estoril	(Spain) Marc Márquez	Derbi	(Germany) Stefan Bradl	Suter	(Spain) Jorge Lorenzo	Yamaha	Report
Year	Track	125cc		250cc		MotoGP		Report
Year	Track	Rider	Manufacturer	Rider	Manufacturer	Rider	Manufacturer	Report
2009	Estoril	(Spain) Pol Espargaró	Derbi	(Italy) Marco Simoncelli	Gilera	(Spain) Jorge Lorenzo	Yamaha	Report
2008	Estoril	(Italy) Simone Corsi	Aprilia	(Spain) Álvaro Bautista	Aprilia	(Spain) Jorge Lorenzo	Yamaha	Report
2007	Estoril	(Spain) Héctor Faubel	Aprilia	(Spain) Álvaro Bautista	Aprilia	(Italy) Valentino Rossi	Yamaha	Report
2006	Estoril	(Spain) Álvaro Bautista	Aprilia	(Italy) Andrea Dovizioso	Honda	(Spain) Toni Elías	Honda	Report
2005	Estoril	(Finland) Mika Kallio	KTM	(Australia) Casey Stoner	Aprilia	(Brazil) Alex Barros	Honda	Report
2004	Estoril	(Spain) Héctor Barberá	Aprilia	(Spain) Toni Elías	Honda	(Italy) Valentino Rossi	Yamaha	Report
2003	Estoril	(Spain) Pablo Nieto	Aprilia	(Spain) Toni Elías	Aprilia	(Italy) Valentino Rossi	Honda	Report
2002	Estoril	(France) Arnaud Vincent	Aprilia	(Spain) Fonsi Nieto	Aprilia	(Italy) Valentino Rossi	Honda	Report
Year	Track	125cc		250cc		500cc		Report
Year	Track	Rider	Manufacturer	Rider	Manufacturer	Rider	Manufacturer	Report
2001	Estoril	(San Marino) Manuel Poggiali	Gilera	(Japan) Daijiro Kato	Honda	(Italy) Valentino Rossi	Honda	Report
2000	Estoril	(Spain) Emilio Alzamora	Honda	(Japan) Daijiro Kato	Honda	(Australia) Garry McCoy	Yamaha	Report

Year	Track	80cc		125cc		250cc		500cc		Report
Year	Track	Rider	Manufacturer	Rider	Manufacturer	Rider	Manufacturer	Rider	Manufacturer	Report
1987	Jarama	(Spain) Jorge Martínez	Derbi	(Italy) Paolo Casoli	MBA	(West Germany) Anton Mang	Honda	(United States) Eddie Lawson	Yamaha	Report
