= Wink Bingo =

- Company type: Private
- Industry: Gambling
- Founded: 2008; 18 years ago
- Headquarters: Ireland
- Services: Online bingo; Online slots
- Parent: Broadway Gaming Ireland DF Limited
- Website: winkbingo.com

Wink Bingo is an online bingo website launched in 2008. It is part of Broadway Gaming Ireland DF Limited and is based and licensed in Ireland.

== History ==
Wink Bingo launched in 2008 and under chief executive Eitan Boyd it grew to 60,000 active players within two years. It had an estimated £1.3 million profit in the first 11 months of trading, and by 2009 it had estimated annual revenue of £15 million.

In 2009 Wink Bingo was purchased by 888 Holdings Plc, which operates a number of entertainment brands including 888casino, 888poker and 888sport. The initial up front fee was reported in the London Evening Standard to be £11 million, rising as high as £59.7 million depending on performance-based earn out arrangements. The acquisition included Daub Ltd’s other online bingo businesses Posh Bingo and Bingo Fabulous. In 2011, the sellers agreed to amend the terms and accept two subsequent payments in addition to the initial cost, of £9.2 million in May and £6.1 million in August.

In 2011 Wink Bingo sponsored ITV2's The Only Way Is Essex, and other notable advertising campaigns have included sponsorship of Harry Hill's TV Burp.

In 2014, Wink Bingo rebranded with an updated slogan 'Wink if you're in!', with an aim of creating a 'sunny, calm and inclusive' online destination, and an accompanying TV commercial featuring the Ottawan song D.I.S.C.O. re-recorded as B.I.N.G.O.. Wink also launched a new digital magazine, 'Winkly', and 'Winkipedia, a bingo encyclopedia'. Wink Bingo is available on desktop and as a mobile app.

Wink launched Wink Slots in 2016 as a companion site to Wink Bingo.

The Advertising Standards Authority has ruled on Wink Bingo's advertisements on a number of occasions. In August 2008, Wink ran a television ad which showed a midwife celebrating while at work at a hospital maternity unit. The ASA banned the ad, concluding that it condoned gambling in the workplace and suggested that it took priority over professional commitments. In June 2013, the Gambling Reform & Society Perception Group (GRASP) challenged the use of semi-naked "athletic" men together with the claim "Go on ... you know you want to" on an outdoor ad, suggesting it linked gambling to seduction and enhanced attractiveness. The complaint was not upheld.

The site underwent another rebrand and pop art inspired redesign in April 2018, taking on a new tone of voice and a new slogan, "You’ve Earned It". An online shop was added, where players can redeem reward points for free play or vouchers for online high street retailers.

In 2021 Wink Bingo was purchased by Saphalata Holdings, a company that forms part of the Broadway Gaming group.

=== Cancer Research UK campaign ===
In 2015 Wink Bingo began an open-ended partnership with the Peter Andre Fund to raise money for Cancer Research UK. Peter Andre also met with players who were selected in a raffle.

== Awards ==
Award	Year
Best Dragonfish Bingo Site, WhichBingo Awards	2018
Online Bingo Operator of the Year, WhichBingo Awards	2011
Players' Choice Award for Best New Entrant, Bingoport Awards	2009
