= Mytopia =

UK video game developer

- Company type: Subsidiary of 888 Holdings
- Founded: 2006; 20 years ago
- Headquarters: UK
- Industry: Video game, social networking service, multi-platform social game, entertainment
- Website: mytopia.com

Mytopia was an online games provider mostly popular on Facebook and on mobile devices. The studio operated several games; the largest was Bingo Island 2.

Mytopia started as a division of Real Dice, Inc, developing a cross-platforms cross-social-networks game world first launched at the TechCrunch50 2008 event. It later became focused on Facebook as its main platform and released games tailored for that platform, while still operating several multiplayer mobile games.

On 14 June 2010, Mytopia was acquired by 888 Holdings, becoming a subsidiary of 888 Holdings based in the UK. The company was founded and owned by Galia Ben Artzi and her brother Guy Ben Artzi. Following the acquisition, Ohad Barzilay, which was the head of the studio at the time, transitioned to the COO and Chief Creative position. The acquisition, valued at $18 million, was aimed at strengthening 888 Holdings' position in the social and mobile gaming sectors in the UK.
