= Calvert v William Hill Credit Ltd =

- Court: High Court of Justice
- Decided: 12 March 2008
- Citation: [2008] EWHC 454 (Ch)

Court membership
- Judge sitting: Briggs J

Calvert v William Hill Credit Ltd. was a High Court of Justice case in which a large bookmaker was sued by a customer who lost £2.1m to William Hill after the bookmaker had failed to implement their own "self-exclusion" policy.

== Background ==
Graham Calvert was a successful greyhound trainer and pathological gambler who in 2006 placed the largest golf bet in history: £347,000 on America to win the Ryder Cup. Calvert lost this and a series of other bets, so in May 2006 he closed his William Hill account and requested that it not be opened again.

Nevertheless, he was allowed by William Hill to continue betting two weeks later. His losses escalated so, again, he requested of the bookmaker that they stop taking his bets. During this "rare moment of clarity," Calvert availed himself of William Hill's and other bookmakers' customer self-exclusion procedures. The William Hill employee who took Calvert's telephone call, John, apparently did not implement the company's procedure and William Hill continued to facilitate Calvert's gambling after he opened another account in his own name two months later. Between June and December 2006 he was permitted to make bets totalling £3.5m, resulting in a net loss of £2.1m.

== Judgment ==
William Hill were found to have failed in their duty of care to Calvert. The judge also remarked upon "significant structural weakness in William Hill's internal arrangements."

However, Calvert's claim for the £2,052,972.18 he lost was thrown out on the grounds that he would have ruined himself via another bookmaker. He had continued to gamble with other companies even while his William Hill accounts were closed.

An additional personal injury claim for damages also failed.

== Aftermath ==
Calvert was jailed for two years in October 2008 on firearms and drugs charges. He, his family and property had been the subject of attacks from loan sharks.

The legality of the disclaimer on William Hill's self-exclusion policy remains untested, since they had not used the policy in the case of Calvert.

== Sources ==
- https://web.archive.org/web/20081025053338/http://www.shieldsgazette.com/news/Gambling-addict-jailed-over-guns.4616074.jp
- bbc.co.uk
- bbc.co.uk
- https://web.archive.org/web/20110204210910/http://www.lawreports.co.uk/WLRD/2008/CACiv/dec0.9.htm
- https://web.archive.org/web/20091031012659/http://www.inhouselawyer.co.uk/index.php/litigation-a-dispute-resolution/7318-no-duty-to-save-you-from-yourself
- http://www.bailii.org/ew/cases/EWHC/Ch/2008/454.html
