= Evoke plc =

International sports betting and online gambling company

- Type: Public
- Traded as: LSE: EVOK
- ISIN: GI000A0F6407
- Industry: Gambling
- Founded: 1997
- Headquarters: Gibraltar
- Key people: Mark Summerfield (Chairman); Per Widerström (CEO)
- Revenue: ▲£1,781.9 million (2025)
- Operating income: ▼£(341.0) million (2025)
- Net income: ▼£(549.1) million (2025)
- Number of employees: 10,617 (2025)
- Website: www.evokeplc.com

Evoke plc, formerly 888 Holdings Limited, is an international sports betting and gambling company. It owns brands such as 888casino, 888poker, 888sport, Mr Green, and William Hill. Business operations are led from its headquarters in Gibraltar, alongside satellite offices in Bucharest, Ceuta, Leeds, London, Malta, Sofia, and Tel Aviv. It is listed on the London Stock Exchange. The company's core markets are the UK, Italy, Spain, Romania and Denmark, which together account for 90% of its revenue.

== History ==
The business was founded in May 1997 by Israeli entrepreneurs Avi and Aaron Shaked and Shay and Ron Ben-Yitzhak, two sets of brothers, as Virtual Holdings Limited. The company's first website, Casino-on-Net was launched at that time, and the administrative centre was established in Antigua. In 2002 Reef Club Casino and Pacific Poker followed. In 2003 its administrative center was moved to Gibraltar. It was first listed on the London Stock Exchange in 2005. Talk of listing began in mid-2005, as other private online gambling companies began to make the move to public ownership, 888 Holdings owned several subsidiaries and brands, which it began to bring under the singular "888.com" brand in early 2006.

Until 2006, 888 Holdings operated Pacific Poker in the US, before online gambling became illegal in that country. In late 2006 Ladbrokes and 888.com announced merger discussions. However, in April 2007 the companies announced that due to recent changes of Tax laws in the UK and fears of legal actions by the US government, both parties had amicably agreed not to continue discussions. In March 2007 888 announced its acquisition of Bingo business of Globalcom Limited for up to $43.4 million in cash. In its first half-year, the company's bingo business earned $14 million in revenues.

888.com overtook the 4th place on the poker network list in April 2012 after almost having tripled their peak number of players from July 2010 to February 2012. In February, 2015, 888 Holdings confirmed it is in "advanced talks" over a reported US$1.47 billion (£750 million) takeover by William Hill. This prompted an 18 percent jump in its share price. The company operates under a gaming licence granted by the government of Gibraltar. Under the terms of the gaming licence 888 owns and operates a number of gaming sites (both for real money and educational sites). In 2014 888 Holdings turned down an offer to acquire the company for 700 million pounds. That year the company revenues began to increase due to mobile customers on its websites, and the company's sites had 17.8 million paying users.

In March 2018, 888 revealed that it had applied for a gaming licence in Malta, due to uncertainty over the UK's exit from the European Union (Brexit) on Gibraltar, a British Overseas Territory.

On 2 May 2020, founder Shay Ben-Yitzhak died in an ultralight plane crash near Yakum, Israel at age 52. His 11-year-old son sustained minor injuries.

On 3 March 2021, 888 Holdings appointed Lord Jonathan Mendelsohn as Chairman.

In May 2022, 888 announced that shareholders had approved the acquisition of international bookmakers William Hill. 888 said the deal was scheduled to close in June 2022: the company will pay £1.95 billion: the acquisition includes all of William Hill's UK assets. The deal marked 888 Holdings’ entry into the retail sports betting market with a network of over 1,400 betting shops in the UK.

In May 2022, 888 announced the launch of its Sports Illustrated Sportsbook (SI Sportsbook) in Virginia. Following the launch of the SI Sportsbook in Colorado, in September 2021, the company plans on expanding the brand in more states within the year.

In March 2024, 888 announced its intention to change its name to evoke to "better reflect the strength of the group's multi-brand operating model and its vision and mission to make life more interesting by delighting players with world-class betting and gaming experiences". The proposed change of name will need shareholder approval.

=== Players in the United States ===
On 2 October 2006, 888 Holdings announced that it had indefinitely suspended business with US customers in light of the passage of the Unlawful Internet Gambling Enforcement Act of 2006 by the US Congress three days before. On 14 August 2007, the US Department of Justice asked to recoup all profits made by the company in the US.

In 2015, as online gambling began to return to the United States, four of the five legal gambling websites were run by 888, including three in Delaware and one in Nevada. The company had first initiated its return to the US market in 2013, partnering with Avenue Capital Group to form the first US online poker network.

In 2018, 888 expanded its American online poker business by becoming the sole owner of the All American Poker Network.

=== Controversies and penalties ===
Shares in 888 Holdings fell by 8% after the company revealed it was under investigation by the Gambling Commission (UKGC) in May 2017. The company was fined a record £7.8 million in August 2017 after more than 7,000 customers were allowed to retain access to their betting accounts even after they decided to ban themselves. Self-excluded players were allowed to place bets for 13 months before 888 Holdings was fined.

In March 2022 888 UK Ltd was fined £9.4 million by the UK Gambling Commission following an investigation which uncovered anti-money laundering (AML) and social responsibility failings.

In November 2025, Evoke plc CEO Per Widerström was named in a criminal complaint in Austria and in May 2026 he was reportedly facing internal pressure to resign.

=== Potential breakup and acquisition ===
In December 2025, Evoke plc announced it was considering a sale or breakup of William Hill and 888 Casino amid rising company debt and ahead of the UK Government increasing tax on gambling operators.

In July 2026, Bally's Intralot was moving closer towards acquiring Evoke plc, having secured a £261 million credit line to help fund the takeover.

== Brands ==
=== 888casino ===
888casino is an online gambling site operated by 888 Holdings. It was founded in 1997 and is based in Gibraltar. In 2013 it became the first exclusively online casino to be licensed in the United States.

=== 888poker ===
888poker is 888's online poker room, launched in July 2002.

=== 888sport ===
888sport is 888's sports betting brand. The online bookmaker was launched in March 2008. The site offers both horse track betting and sports betting, in addition to access to 888 Holdings' other sites. Sports leagues on which bets can be placed include those of Europe, North America, and elsewhere. This includes live betting, where bets can be placed on in-game action, in addition to pre-game bets. The brand is the title sponsor for the 888Sport Tingle Creek Chase, in addition to the 888Sport Magnolia Stakes. In 2010 888sport became the title sponsor of the Fontwell Park Racecourse, renaming it the 888sport Grand Stand. 888sport also works in social media surrounding sporting events, distributing content to its followers form other content sources, and has held online sports video competitions. In March 2019, 888 Holdings paid £15 million for Dublin-based Dedsert Ltd, which provided the sportsbook platform for UK-licensed bookmaker BetBright. 888 CEO Itai Pazner said the acquisition "gives us the missing piece in our proprietary and technology portfolio".

=== William Hill ===
888 has owned international bookmakers William Hill since June 2022.

=== Bingo brands ===
888 Holdings owned and operated several different online bingo sites. They offer 90-ball and 75-ball bingo games, along with online slot machine games, progressive jackpots, and scratchcards. The games all run on a no download required basis and have an emphasis on community and chat rooms. In December 2009, 888.com purchased brands including Wink Bingo, Posh Bingo, Tasty Bingo, and RedBus Bingo from Daub. 888ladies.com was 888's online bingo room. The bingo site was launched in February 2008 after 888 acquired online bingo company Globalcom. 888ladies offers 75-ball, 90-ball and 5-line bingo games as well as instant games, casino games and scratchcards. In January 2013, 888ladies.com launched a mobile app for iOS devices, and later for Android devices. The site is known for running frequent competitions.

Wink Bingo launched in 2008 and was the biggest site in the Joy of Bingo network and the second largest 888 bingo site. 888's acquisition of the site was followed by a TV ad campaign that included projecting the Wink Bingo logo onto the Houses of Parliament. Wink Bingo also runs frequent promotions and competitions. In January 2014, Wink launched The Breakfast Club competition, asking readers to photograph their meals and upload them to the Wink Bingo Facebook page for the chance to win ASDA vouchers. The competition received news coverage in Hello! Magazine and Reading Chronicle. Posh Bingo launched in September 2006 and underwent a major redesign in March 2012. The site has a fashion theme. Tasty Bingo launched in March 2010 and is themed around food. RedBus Bingo launched in April 2010 and has a London theme. Bingo Street launched in July 2011, and is based on a typical UK street, with rooms titled 'Bingo Supermarket' and 'Bingo Hall'.

Big Brother Bingo launched in January 2012 and is based on the reality television show Big Brother on Channel 5. There are also standard cash prizes and polls on the housemates.

888bingo.com was the second online bingo site by 888, after 888ladies. It was formally launched in December 2009. It offers a selection of games including 75-ball and 90-ball bingo, team bingo, slots, instant games, video poker, and table games. 888's Facebook app Bingo Appy launched in December 2012. offering bingo, casino and slots games via Facebook. It is now the only bingo app on Facebook to permit users to bet and win real money, with Bingo Friendzy's withdrawal. The app offers 75-ball and 90-ball bingo, instant games, scratchcards and freebie rooms. 888 had initially provided a 'freemium' or play-for-fun service on Facebook before the introduction of Bingo Appy.

In July 2022, 888 Holdings completed the sale of its entire B2C and B2B online bingo businesses to Saphalata Holdings, part of the Broadway Gaming group, for $43.25m: the entities sold included 888ladies.com, winkbingo.com, winkslots.com, etc. All those online bingo brands are now owned by the Broadway Gaming Group and are operated by Broadway Gaming Ireland DF Limited, a company incorporated in the Republic of Ireland.

=== Sports Illustrated Sportsbook and Casino ===
Sports illustrated Sportsbook is a brand that combines 888 and Sports illustrated and offers players sports betting offerings. The company combines sports offerings from 888 in addition to sports data from Sports illustrated and is currently live in the U.S. states of Colorado, Michigan, and Virginia. On February 9, 2023, SI Sportsbook launched its casino product in Michigan, marking the official expansion of the sports book product into the casino space

In March 2024, 888 announced that it would be selling its US online gambling assets to Hard Rock Digital, concluding its strategic review of its US B2C and exiting the US market. The sale is subject to regulatory approvals and other conditions, expected to be finalized in stages by year-end. 888 plans a controlled exit from its US B2C operations by the end of 2024, anticipating a recurring annualized benefit to EBITDA of £25 million starting in 2025, with £10 million reinvested for growth. However, the exit will incur one-off cash costs of approximately £40 million, including a brand license termination fee. Additionally, 888 will end its partnership with Authentic Brands Group, paying $25 million in cash and an additional $25 million by 2029.

== Senior management ==
Gigi Levy was chief executive (CEO) until 2011. He was replaced by Brian Mattingley in March 2012. In 2015 Mattingley left the position of CEO to assume the position of executive chairman of 888 Holdings.

Itai Frieberger replaced Mattingley as CEO in February 2016 and was succeeded by former chief operating officer Itai Pazner, a 17-year company veteran, in January 2019.

It was announced in January 2023 that Pazner would be removed from his role as CEO and Per Widerström was appointed CEO in July 2023.

== See also ==
- Mytopia
