= 2021 Portuguese motorcycle Grand Prix =

Third round of the 2021 Grand Prix motorcycle racing season

(Portugal) 2021 Portuguese Grand Prix
Race details
- Race 3 of 18 races in the 2021 Grand Prix motorcycle racing season
- Date: 18 April 2021
- Official name: Grande Prémio 888 de Portugal
- Location: Autódromo Internacional do Algarve; Portimão, Algarve, Portugal
- Course: Permanent racing facility; 4.592 km (2.853 mi)

MotoGP
Pole position
| Rider | (France) Fabio Quartararo | Yamaha |
| Time | 1:38.862 | |
Fastest lap
| Rider | (Spain) Álex Rins | Suzuki |
| Time | 1:39.450 on lap 18 | |
Podium
| First | (France) Fabio Quartararo | Yamaha |
| Second | (Italy) Francesco Bagnaia | Ducati |
| Third | (Spain) Joan Mir | Suzuki |

Moto2
Pole position
| Rider | (United Kingdom) Sam Lowes | Kalex |
| Time | 1:42.901 | |
Fastest lap
| Rider | (Spain) Raúl Fernández | Kalex |
| Time | 1:42.864 on lap 21 | |
Podium
| First | (Spain) Raúl Fernández | Kalex |
| Second | (Spain) Arón Canet | Boscoscuro |
| Third | (Australia) Remy Gardner | Kalex |

Moto3
Pole position
| Rider | (Italy) Andrea Migno | Honda |
| Time | 1:47.423 | |
Fastest lap
| Rider | (Argentina) Gabriel Rodrigo | Honda |
| Time | 1:47.610 on lap 13 | |
Podium
| First | (Spain) Pedro Acosta | KTM |
| Second | (Italy) Dennis Foggia | Honda |
| Third | (Italy) Andrea Migno | Honda |

The 2021 Portuguese motorcycle Grand Prix (officially known as the Grande Prémio 888 de Portugal) was the third round of the 2021 Grand Prix motorcycle racing season. It was held at the Autódromo Internacional do Algarve in Portimão on 18 April 2021.

== Background ==
=== Impact of the COVID-19 pandemic ===
On 22 January 2021 Dorna announced a significant update of the provisional calendar following the postponement of the Argentine and American Grands Prix, originally scheduled as the second and third rounds of the championship (on 11 and 18 April respectively) due to the COVID-19 situation in both countries, with potential rescheduling for the last quarter of 2021. The Portuguese Grand Prix at the Algarve was entered as a reserve Grand Prix, along with the Indonesian Grand Prix and the Russian Grand Prix (later removed from the list). On the same day Dorna announced an agreement with the organizers of the Portuguese Grand Prix to hold the race on the Algarve circuit as the third stage of the 2021 championship (the first of the season in Europe) on 18 April. Portugal had returned to the championship as a substitute race the previous year, when the last round of the 2020 championship was held.

=== MotoGP Championship standings before the race ===
After the Doha Grand Prix, Johann Zarco is the new leader of the rider standings at 40 points, followed by the Monster Energy Yamaha riders Fabio Quartararo and Maverick Viñales, winners of the first two races of the season, four points behind; followed by Francesco Bagnaia and Álex Rins, respectively fourteen and seventeen points behind Zarco.

In the constructors' classification, Yamaha leads with 50 points, 10 more than Ducati. Suzuki is third at 26 points, with Aprilia fourth at 15 points; KTM and Honda close at 11 points.

In the team championship standings, Monster Energy Yamaha is first with 72 points. Pramac Racing is second at 57 points, with Team Suzuki Ecstar and Ducati Lenovo Team following at 45 and 40 points respectively. Repsol Honda Team is fifth with 18 points.

=== Moto2 Championship riders' standings before the race ===
Sam Lowes leads the intermediate class with 50 points, followed by Remy Gardner at 40 points. Raúl Fernández is third with 26 points, one more than Marco Bezzecchi and five more than Fabio Di Giannantonio.

=== Moto3 Championship riders' standings before the race ===
After his victory in the Doha Grand Prix, Pedro Acosta moved up to the top of the standings with 45 points, followed by Darryn Binder on 36 points and Jaume Masiá on 32 points. Fourth and fifth Niccolò Antonelli and Izan Guevara respectively at 26 and 19 points.

=== MotoGP participants ===
Marc Márquez returns as Honda's starter rider after the incident in the 2020 Spanish Grand Prix, which is valid as the first race of the 2020 championship.

=== Moto2 participants ===
- Miquel Pons replace Simone Corsi because of an injury.
- Fraser Rogers replace Barry Baltus because of fractured left wrist injury.

=== Moto3 participants ===
The riders and teams were the same as the season entry list with no additional stand-in riders for the race.

== Free practice ==
=== MotoGP ===
Maverick Viñales was fastest in the first session, followed by Álex Rins and Marc Márquez. In the second session, Francesco Bagnaia preceded Fabio Quartararo and Joan Mir. In the third session, Quartararo finished at the top of the standings ahead of Franco Morbidelli and Bagnaia.

=== Combined Free Practice 1-2-3 ===
The top ten riders (written in bold) qualified in Q2.

Fastest session lap

The fastest personal time of the riders are written in bold type.

| Pos. | No. | Rider | Constructor | Free practice times | | |
| Pos. | No. | Rider | Constructor | FP1 | FP2 | FP3 |
|---|---|---|---|---|---|---|
| 1 | 20 | (France) **Fabio Quartararo** | **Yamaha** | 1:42.528 | 1:40.206 | **1:39.044** |
| 2 | 21 | (Italy) **Franco Morbidelli** | **Yamaha** | 1:43.243 | 1:41.216 | **1:39.095** |
| 3 | 63 | (Italy) **Francesco Bagnaia** | **Ducati** | 1:42.464 | 1:39.866 | **1'39.117** |
OFFICIAL MOTOGP COMBINED FREE PRACTICE TIMES REPORT

== Qualifying ==
=== MotoGP ===
Fastest session lap

| Pos. | No. | Biker | Constructor | Qualifying times | | Final grid | Row |
| Pos. | No. | Biker | Constructor | Q1 | Q2 | Final grid | Row |
|---|---|---|---|---|---|---|---|
| 1 | 20 | (France) Fabio Quartararo | Yamaha | **Qualified in Q2** | **1:38.862** | 1 | 1 |
| 2 | 42 | (Spain) Álex Rins | Suzuki | **Qualified in Q2** | 1:38.951 | 2 | 1 |
| 3 | 5 | (France) Johann Zarco | Ducati | **Qualified in Q2** | 1:38.991 | 3 | 1 |
| 4 | 43 | (Australia) Jack Miller | Ducati | **Qualified in Q2** | 1:39.061 | 4 | 2 |
| 5 | 21 | (Italy) Franco Morbidelli | Yamaha | **Qualified in Q2** | 1:39.103 | 5 | 2 |
| 6 | 93 | (Spain) Marc Márquez | Honda | **1:39.253** | 1:39.121 | 6 | 2 |
| 7 | 41 | (Spain) Aleix Espargaró | Aprilia | **Qualified in Q2** | 1:39.169 | 7 | 3 |
| 8 | 10 | (Italy) Luca Marini | Ducati | **Qualified in Q2** | 1:39.386 | 8 | 3 |
| 9 | 36 | (Spain) Joan Mir | Suzuki | **1:39.302** | 1:39.398 | 9 | 3 |
| 10 | 88 | (Portugal) Miguel Oliveira | KTM | **Qualified in Q2** | 1:39.445 | 10 | 4 |
| 11 | 63 | (Italy) Francesco Bagnaia | Ducati | **Qualified in Q2** | 1:39.482 | 11 | 4 |
| 12 | 12 | (Spain) Maverick Viñales | Yamaha | **Qualified in Q2** | 1:39.807 | 12 | 4 |
| 13 | 73 | (Spain) Álex Márquez | Honda | 1:39.530 | N/A | 13 | 5 |
| 14 | 44 | (Spain) Pol Espargaró | Honda | 1:39.710 | N/A | 14 | 5 |
| 15 | 33 | (South Africa) Brad Binder | KTM | 1:39.776 | N/A | 15 | 5 |
| 16 | 23 | (Italy) Enea Bastianini | Ducati | 1:39.855 | N/A | 16 | 6 |
| 17 | 46 | (Italy) Valentino Rossi | Yamaha | 1:39.943 | N/A | 17 | 6 |
| 18 | 9 | (Italy) Danilo Petrucci | KTM | 1:40.202 | N/A | 18 | 6 |
| 19 | 27 | (Spain) Iker Lecuona | KTM | 1:40.408 | N/A | 19 | 7 |
| 20 | 32 | (Italy) Lorenzo Savadori | Aprilia | 1:40.444 | N/A | 20 | 7 |
| 21 | 30 | (Japan) Takaaki Nakagami | Honda | N/A | N/A | 21 | 7 |
OFFICIAL MOTOGP QUALIFYING RESULTS

== Race ==
=== MotoGP ===
| Pos. | No. | Rider | Team | Manufacturer | Laps | Time/Retired | Grid | Points |
|---|---|---|---|---|---|---|---|---|
| 1 | 20 | (France) **Fabio Quartararo** | **Monster Energy Yamaha MotoGP** | **Yamaha** | 25 | 41:46.412 | 1 | 25 |
| 2 | 63 | (Italy) **Francesco Bagnaia** | **Ducati Lenovo Team** | **Ducati** | 25 | +4.809 | 11 | 20 |
| 3 | 36 | (Spain) **Joan Mir** | **Team Suzuki Ecstar** | **Suzuki** | 25 | +4.948 | 9 | 16 |
| 4 | 21 | (Italy) **Franco Morbidelli** | **Petronas Yamaha SRT** | **Yamaha** | 25 | +5.127 | 5 | 13 |
| 5 | 33 | (South Africa) **Brad Binder** | **Red Bull KTM Factory Racing** | **KTM** | 25 | +6.668 | 15 | 11 |
| 6 | 41 | (Spain) **Aleix Espargaró** | **Aprilia Racing Team Gresini** | **Aprilia** | 25 | +8.885 | 7 | 10 |
| 7 | 93 | (Spain) **Marc Márquez** | **Repsol Honda Team** | **Honda** | 25 | +13.208 | 6 | 9 |
| 8 | 73 | (Spain) **Álex Márquez** | **LCR Honda Castrol** | **Honda** | 25 | +17.992 | 13 | 8 |
| 9 | 23 | (Italy) **Enea Bastianini** | **Avintia Esponsorama** | **Ducati** | 25 | +22.369 | 16 | 7 |
| 10 | 30 | (Japan) **Takaaki Nakagami** | **LCR Honda Idemitsu** | **Honda** | 25 | +23.676 | 21 | 6 |
| 11 | 12 | (Spain) **Maverick Viñales** | **Monster Energy Yamaha MotoGP** | **Yamaha** | 25 | +23.761 | 12 | 5 |
| 12 | 10 | (Italy) **Luca Marini** | **Sky VR46 Avintia** | **Ducati** | 25 | +29.660 | 8 | 4 |
| 13 | 9 | (Italy) **Danilo Petrucci** | **Tech3 KTM Factory Racing** | **KTM** | 25 | +29.836 | 18 | 3 |
| 14 | 32 | (Italy) **Lorenzo Savadori** | **Aprilia Racing Team Gresini** | **Aprilia** | 25 | +38.941 | 20 | 2 |
| 15 | 27 | (Spain) **Iker Lecuona** | **Tech3 KTM Factory Racing** | **KTM** | 25 | +50.642 | 19 | 1 |
| 16 | 88 | (Portugal) Miguel Oliveira | Red Bull KTM Factory Racing | KTM | 24 | +1 lap | 10 | |
| Ret | 5 | (France) Johann Zarco | Pramac Racing | Ducati | 19 | Accident | 3 | |
| Ret | 42 | (Spain) Álex Rins | Team Suzuki Ecstar | Suzuki | 18 | Accident | 2 | |
| Ret | 46 | (Italy) Valentino Rossi | Petronas Yamaha SRT | Yamaha | 14 | Accident | 17 | |
| Ret | 43 | (Australia) Jack Miller | Ducati Lenovo Team | Ducati | 5 | Accident | 4 | |
| Ret | 44 | (Spain) Pol Espargaró | Repsol Honda Team | Honda | 4 | Rear Brakes | 14 | |
| DNS | 89 | (Spain) Jorge Martín | Pramac Racing | Ducati | | Did not start | | |
Fastest lap: (Spain) Álex Rins (Suzuki) – 1:39.450 (lap 18)
Sources:

- Jorge Martín suffered hand & foot fractures in a crash during practice and withdrew from the event.

=== Moto2 ===
| Pos. | No. | Rider | Manufacturer | Laps | Time/Retired | Grid | Points |
|---|---|---|---|---|---|---|---|
| 1 | 25 | (Spain) **Raúl Fernández** | **Kalex** | 23 | 39:47.377 | 10 | 25 |
| 2 | 44 | (Spain) **Arón Canet** | **Boscoscuro** | 23 | +1.600 | 9 | 20 |
| 3 | 87 | (Australia) **Remy Gardner** | **Kalex** | 23 | +1.968 | 2 | 16 |
| 4 | 16 | (United States) **Joe Roberts** | **Kalex** | 23 | +2.397 | 8 | 13 |
| 5 | 37 | (Spain) **Augusto Fernández** | **Kalex** | 23 | +5.622 | 6 | 11 |
| 6 | 72 | (Italy) **Marco Bezzecchi** | **Kalex** | 23 | +6.344 | 5 | 10 |
| 7 | 97 | (Spain) **Xavi Vierge** | **Kalex** | 23 | +7.360 | 3 | 9 |
| 8 | 40 | (Spain) **Héctor Garzó** | **Kalex** | 23 | +12.540 | 12 | 8 |
| 9 | 6 | (United States) **Cameron Beaubier** | **Kalex** | 23 | +14.989 | 13 | 7 |
| 10 | 23 | (Germany) **Marcel Schrötter** | **Kalex** | 23 | +15.240 | 19 | 6 |
| 11 | 21 | (Italy) **Fabio Di Giannantonio** | **Kalex** | 23 | +15.521 | 16 | 5 |
| 12 | 19 | (Italy) **Lorenzo Dalla Porta** | **Kalex** | 23 | +15.667 | 21 | 4 |
| 13 | 75 | (Spain) **Albert Arenas** | **Boscoscuro** | 23 | +19.513 | 7 | 3 |
| 14 | 7 | (Italy) **Lorenzo Baldassarri** | **MV Agusta** | 23 | +23.147 | 24 | 2 |
| 15 | 42 | (Spain) **Marcos Ramírez** | **Kalex** | 23 | +23.494 | 17 | 1 |
| 16 | 14 | (Italy) Tony Arbolino | Kalex | 23 | +23.639 | 25 | |
| 17 | 12 | (Switzerland) Thomas Lüthi | Kalex | 23 | +27.470 | 22 | |
| 18 | 55 | (Malaysia) Hafizh Syahrin | NTS | 23 | +56.999 | 27 | |
| 19 | 77 | (Spain) Miquel Pons | MV Agusta | 23 | +1:00.417 | 28 | |
| 20 | 89 | (United Kingdom) Fraser Rogers | NTS | 23 | +1:21.966 | 29 | |
| 21 | 35 | (Thailand) Somkiat Chantra | Kalex | 23 | +1:25.160 | 11 | |
| 22 | 9 | (Spain) Jorge Navarro | Boscoscuro | 20 | +3 laps | 30 | |
| Ret | 96 | (United Kingdom) Jake Dixon | Kalex | 14 | Accident | 14 | |
| Ret | 13 | (Italy) Celestino Vietti | Kalex | 11 | Collision | 23 | |
| Ret | 11 | (Italy) Nicolò Bulega | Kalex | 11 | Collision | 15 | |
| Ret | 64 | (Netherlands) Bo Bendsneyder | Kalex | 7 | Accident | 26 | |
| Ret | 79 | (Japan) Ai Ogura | Kalex | 4 | Collision | 4 | |
| Ret | 5 | (Italy) Yari Montella | Boscoscuro | 3 | Accident | 18 | |
| Ret | 62 | (Italy) Stefano Manzi | Kalex | 3 | Collision | 20 | |
| Ret | 22 | (United Kingdom) Sam Lowes | Kalex | 0 | Accident | 1 | |
OFFICIAL MOTO2 RACE REPORT

=== Moto3 ===
| Pos. | No. | Rider | Manufacturer | Laps | Time/Retired | Grid | Points |
|---|---|---|---|---|---|---|---|
| 1 | 37 | (Spain) **Pedro Acosta** | **KTM** | 21 | 38:01.773 | 8 | 25 |
| 2 | 7 | (Italy) **Dennis Foggia** | **Honda** | 21 | +0.051 | 2 | 20 |
| 3 | 16 | (Italy) **Andrea Migno** | **Honda** | 21 | +0.584 | 1 | 16 |
| 4 | 71 | (Japan) **Ayumu Sasaki** | **KTM** | 21 | +0.615 | 6 | 13 |
| 5 | 2 | (Argentina) **Gabriel Rodrigo** | **Honda** | 21 | +0.675 | 4 | 11 |
| 6 | 23 | (Italy) **Niccolò Antonelli** | **KTM** | 21 | +0.729 | 13 | 10 |
| 7 | 55 | (Italy) **Romano Fenati** | **Husqvarna** | 21 | +0.773 | 10 | 9 |
| 8 | 11 | (Spain) **Sergio García** | **Gas Gas** | 21 | +1.245 | 3 | 8 |
| 9 | 5 | (Spain) **Jaume Masiá** | **KTM** | 21 | +12.487 | 7 | 7 |
| 10 | 6 | (Japan) **Ryusei Yamanaka** | **KTM** | 21 | +12.508 | 18 | 6 |
| 11 | 82 | (Italy) **Stefano Nepa** | **KTM** | 21 | +12.541 | 21 | 5 |
| 12 | 50 | (Switzerland) **Jason Dupasquier** | **KTM** | 21 | +12.593 | 23 | 4 |
| 13 | 12 | (Czech Republic) **Filip Salač** | **Honda** | 21 | +12.833 | 14 | 3 |
| 14 | 52 | (Spain) **Jeremy Alcoba** | **Honda** | 21 | +13.743 | 26 (Note: Pit lane start penalty.) | 2 |
| 15 | 53 | (Turkey) **Deniz Öncü** | **KTM** | 21 | +13.788 | 27 | 1 |
| 16 | 92 | (Japan) Yuki Kunii | Honda | 21 | +15.234 | 16 | |
| 17 | 99 | (Spain) Carlos Tatay | KTM | 21 | +18.032 | 20 | |
| 18 | 19 | (Indonesia) Andi Farid Izdihar | Honda | 21 | +20.284 | 15 | |
| 19 | 54 | (Italy) Riccardo Rossi | KTM | 21 | +20.343 | 22 | |
| 20 | 40 | (South Africa) Darryn Binder | Honda | 21 | +33.374 | 25 | |
| 21 | 73 | (Austria) Maximilian Kofler | KTM | 21 | +33.410 | 19 | |
| 22 | 20 | (France) Lorenzo Fellon | Honda | 21 | +36.502 (Note: 3-second penalty for exceeding track limits.) | 24 | |
| 23 | 17 | (United Kingdom) John McPhee | Honda | 21 | +37.540 | 28 | |
| 24 | 28 | (Spain) Izan Guevara | Gas Gas | 21 | +1:08.552 | 11 | |
| NC | 27 | (Japan) Kaito Toba | KTM | 15 | +6 laps (Note: Not classified due to not completing enough laps.) | 17 | |
| Ret | 31 | (Spain) Adrián Fernández | Husqvarna | 16 | Collision Damage | 12 | |
| Ret | 24 | (Japan) Tatsuki Suzuki | Honda | 15 | Accident | 9 | |
| Ret | 43 | (Spain) Xavier Artigas | Honda | 4 | Collision Damage | 5 | |
OFFICIAL MOTO3 RACE REPORT

== Championship standings after the race ==
Below are the standings for the top five riders, constructors, and teams after the round.

=== MotoGP ===
Riders' Championship standings

| | Pos. | Rider | Points |
|---|---|---|---|
| 1 | 1 | (France) Fabio Quartararo | 61 |
| 2 | 2 | (Italy) Francesco Bagnaia | 46 |
| | 3 | (Spain) Maverick Viñales | 41 |
| 3 | 4 | (France) Johann Zarco | 40 |
| 1 | 5 | (Spain) Joan Mir | 38 |

Constructors' Championship standings

| Pos. | Constructor | Points |
|---|---|---|
| 1 | (Japan) Yamaha | 75 |
| 2 | (Italy) Ducati | 60 |
| 3 | (Japan) Suzuki | 42 |
| 4 | (Italy) Aprilia | 25 |
| 5 | (Austria) KTM | 22 |

Teams' Championship standings

| | Pos. | Team | Points |
|---|---|---|---|
| | 1 | (Japan) Monster Energy Yamaha MotoGP | 102 |
| 1 | 2 | (Japan) Team Suzuki Ecstar | 61 |
| 1 | 3 | (Italy) Ducati Lenovo Team | 60 |
| 2 | 4 | (Italy) Pramac Racing | 57 |
| 1 | 5 | (Italy) Aprilia Racing Team Gresini | 27 |

=== Moto2 ===
Riders' Championship standings

| | Pos. | Rider | Points |
|---|---|---|---|
| 1 | 1 | (Australia) Remy Gardner | 56 |
| 1 | 2 | (Spain) Raúl Fernández | 52 |
| 2 | 3 | (United Kingdom) Sam Lowes | 50 |
| | 4 | (Italy) Marco Bezzecchi | 36 |
| | 5 | (Italy) Fabio Di Giannantonio | 27 |

Constructors' Championship standings

| Pos. | Constructor | Points |
|---|---|---|
| 1 | (Germany) Kalex | 75 |
| 2 | (Italy) Boscoscuro | 29 |
| 3 | (Italy) MV Agusta | 2 |

Teams' Championship standings

| | Pos. | Team | Points |
|---|---|---|---|
| | 1 | (Finland) Red Bull KTM Ajo | 108 |
| | 2 | (Belgium) Elf Marc VDS Racing Team | 73 |
| | 3 | (Italy) Sky Racing Team VR46 | 49 |
| 3 | 4 | (Italy) Italtrans Racing Team | 29 |
| 8 | 5 | (Spain) Solunion Aspar Team | 27 |

=== Moto3 ===
Riders' Championship standings

| | Pos. | Rider | Points |
|---|---|---|---|
| | 1 | (Spain) Pedro Acosta | 70 |
| 1 | 2 | (Spain) Jaume Masiá | 39 |
| 1 | 3 | (South Africa) Darryn Binder | 36 |
| | 4 | (Italy) Niccolò Antonelli | 36 |
| 4 | 5 | (Italy) Andrea Migno | 29 |

Constructors' Championship standings

| Pos. | Constructor | Points |
|---|---|---|
| 1 | (Austria) KTM | 75 |
| 2 | (Japan) Honda | 56 |
| 3 | (Spain) Gas Gas | 31 |
| 4 | (Sweden) Husqvarna | 20 |

Teams' Championship standings

| | Pos. | Team | Points |
|---|---|---|---|
| | 1 | (Finland) Red Bull KTM Ajo | 109 |
| 2 | 2 | (Spain) Avintia Esponsorama Moto3 | 40 |
| | 3 | (Spain) GasGas Valresa Aspar | 40 |
| 2 | 4 | (Malaysia) Petronas Sprinta Racing | 36 |
| 2 | 5 | (Italy) Rivacold Snipers Team | 35 |

== Notes ==
| Previous race: 2021 Doha Grand Prix | FIM Grand Prix World Championship; 2021 season | Next race: 2021 Spanish Grand Prix |
| Previous race: 2020 Portuguese Grand Prix | Portuguese motorcycle Grand Prix | Next race: 2022 Portuguese Grand Prix |
