= Française des Jeux =

Française des Jeux may refer to:

- Française des Jeux (cycling team)
- Française des Jeux (lottery)
