= 888casino =

Online casino founded in 1997

- Industry: Gambling
- Founded: 1998
- Headquarters: Gibraltar
- Area served: Worldwide
- Products: Online casino
- Parent: Evoke plc
- Website: 888casino.com

888casino, formerly Casino-on-Net, is an online casino brand owned by Evoke plc. It was founded in 1997, and is headquartered in Gibraltar. It is one of the Internet's oldest casinos, and in 2013 it became the first exclusively online casino to be licensed in the United States.

== History ==
Casino-on-Net was established by brothers Aaron and Avi Shaked along with partners Ron and Shay Ben-Yitzhaq, also two brothers, in 1997. Aaron Shaked claims to have come up with the idea of the online casino while attending a dentistry conference in Monte Carlo. In 1994, the Free Trade & Processing Zone Act was passed in Antigua and Barbuda, opening the way for the development of legal online casinos. Casino-on-Net was re-branded as 888casino in 2010 to unify the look and feel with other 888 brands. By 2015 the site was licensed and operating in Gibraltar, New Jersey, Denmark, Spain and a number of other countries and territories.

In 2015, Gaming Intelligence magazine described 888casino as "the only truly pan-European casino." In 2017, 888casino signed a deal to include slot games from Berlin-based Merkur Interactive Services GmbH, part of the Gauselmann Group. 888casino has been awarded eCOGRA's Safe and Fair assurance seal. In 2021, 888casino stopped offering sports betting in New Jersey as it prepares to launch its regulated Sports Illustrated-branded sportsbook in the state. In 2024, the brand has officially left New Jersey market ceasing all operation in the area. On 9 September 2021, 888casino acquired William Hill International's European business from US owners Caesars Entertainment for a purchase price of £2.2 billion.

== Sponsorship ==
888casino has been involved in sponsorship of sporting events, teams and athletes, including as title sponsor of the 2013 World Seniors Championship in snooker, the New York Jets of the NFL, Middlesbrough FC, Dundalk FC, and title sponsor of the 2021 Portuguese motorcycle Grand Prix.

== United States ==
As a result of an act of the United States Congress in October 2006, online gaming firms were forced to their presence in the U.S. market, resulting in a mass exit from the U.S. market for these sites. In March 2013, the Nevada Gaming Commission granted 888casino a license as an Interactive Gaming Service Provider, making it the first company providing exclusively online gambling to be licensed by any U.S. jurisdiction.

In January 2011, the New Jersey Legislature passed a bill sponsored by Raymond Lesniak to allow online gambling by New Jersey residents over the age of 21. In August 2013, 888casino signed an agreement with Caesars Entertainment Corporation, through the group's All American Poker Network (AAPN) joint venture with Avenue Capital, enabling 888casino to offer own-branded products in New Jersey. 888casino publishes an independently audited monthly Casino Payout Percentage and includes the Payout Percentage of each game, as well as the total average Payout Percentage of 888casino. 888casino's payout rate is 95.1%.

In March 2024, 888 Holdings announced a strategic withdrawal from the U.S. market. According to a statement to investors, the company concluded that its U.S. B2C operations lacked a viable path to profitability due to high customer-acquisition costs, intense competition, and the scale required to operate effectively in regulated U.S. states. Later that month, the group agreed to sell selected U.S. assets to Hard Rock Digital, completing its exit from the New Jersey market in 2024. By 2025, 888 no longer operated any online casino services in the United States, marking a full retreat from the American B2C gambling sector. The company stated that withdrawing from the U.S. would enable it to redirect investment toward core regulated markets with stronger near-term growth and profitability potential.
