= Mr Green (company) =

Online gambling company in Malta

- Company type: Subsidiary
- Industry: Gambling
- Founded: 2007; 19 years ago
- Headquarters: Malta
- Key people: Nir Hakarmeli (CEO)
- Products: Sports betting, online casino
- Parent: Evoke plc
- Website: Official website

Mr Green is an international online gambling company founded in 2007. Its product offering includes sports betting and online casino. In January 2019, Mr Green was acquired by William Hill for £242m. In July 2022, William Hill was subsequently acquired by Evoke plc for £2.2 billion.

Mr Green was established by three Swedish entrepreneurs: Fredrik Sidfalk, Henrik Bergquist and Mikael Pawlo. Sidfalk and Bergquist had experience in the iGaming sector after founding the company, brand and website of Betsson together with Anders Holmgren back in 2001.

== Parent Company ==
Mr Green & Co AB was the original name of the parent company, where the online casino Mr Green (Mr Green Ltd) was the largest company. The parent company, Mr Green & Co AB, was the based in Stockholm, Sweden until January 2019.

Mr Green & Co AB advanced to the Mid Cap segment in December 2017 after Nasdaq Stockholm's yearly review of the market value of the companies on its main market. This means that Mr Green was segmented as a Mid Cap company as of 2 January 2018.

Evoke plc, the parent company of Mr Green, is a multinational online gaming company headquartered in Malta. The company operates several brands across various markets, including Mr Green, which offers online casino and sports betting services. In July 2021, Mr Green expanded its operations into the German market, leveraging Evoke's resources and expertise to provide a high-quality gaming experience to German players.

== Brands and licenses ==
Mr Green was awarded a UK Operator Licence in July 2015, which shows the company's aim to increase the proportion of revenues from locally regulated markets

Mr Green was awarded a casino license in Denmark as part of the company's strategy of expansion to locally regulated markets after the acquisition of the Danish Online Casino Dansk Underholdning in 2017.

In February 2018, Mr Green finalised the acquisition of Evoke Gaming Ltd including the gaming sites Redbet, Vinnarum Casino, Bertil and MamaMiaBingo.

== Product ==
In April 2016, Mr Green launched their Sportsbook powered by the Swedish-based platform provider Kambi with the intention to offer Mr Greens players a personalised sports betting experience. In September 2017 Mr Green launched Sportsbook Version 2.0, an updated version of the product that featured a BettorLogic partnership providing unique football in-play features and CRM and marketing assistance.

In October 2017, Mr Green expanded its product range to include custom bingo and keno products to widen the player offering and continue to build brand awareness and attraction in the UK, both platforms powered by iGame provider CozyGames.

Following a partnership with Swedish developer NetEnt, Mr Green launched a 3D live casino through their mobile platform in February 2018. Known as 'Live Beyond Live', the virtual environment based experience is designed to immerse players in a social and interactive environment.

== Sponsorships ==
In November 2017, Mr Green announced a sponsorship deal with Scottish football club, Celtic. As a result of this sponsorship, Mr Green sportsbook became Celtic's official casino partner. This followed previously signed deals with English club Wigan Athletic and Irish side Bohemian.

In November 2017, Mr Green was the head sponsor of the Professional Darts Corporation Players Championship Finals which took place at the end of the month.

== Green Gaming ==
Mr Green invests in its Green Gaming Programme. When a new customer signs up, he or she is asked to set limits for the risks he or she is willing to take in his or her play.

In September 2017, Green Gaming announced a new predictive gaming tool. The Green Gaming Predictive tool, developed in partnership with Sustainable Interaction and Sebastian Gassner analyses the playing behaviour of a customer and combines it with the customer's own perception of their risk behaviours which gives players the ability to gain insight into their own risk behaviour - according to Green Gaming itself.

Players who exhibit increased risk behaviour will be asked to set different limits for their playing or to step back from playing for a period. Mr Green will also refrain from communicating sales messages to customers with increased risk behaviours.

== Illegal Gambling ==
In the financial year of 2019, Mr Green was fined £3m by the UK Gambling Commission for failing to protect problematic gambling and money laundering.

The company received a new $3.62m fine in August 2021, due to its failures in taking "sufficient measures to help customers reduce their gambling" and in adhere to the current anti-money laundering regulations.
