= FDJ United =

Operator of the French national lottery

La Française des Jeux
- Type: Société anonyme
- Traded as: Euronext Paris: FDJ; CAC Mid 60 Component
- Industry: Lottery
- Predecessor: Loterie nationale (France)
- Founded: 1976; 50 years ago
- Headquarters: Boulogne-Billancourt, France
- Key people: Christophe Blanchard-Dignac
- Revenue: 1,956 billions € (2019)
- Operating income: 133 millions € (2019)
- Net income: 425,100,000 (2023)
- Owner: FDJ United
- Number of employees: 2200 (2018)
- Subsidiaries: Fondation FDJ; ImSoProd; Nirio
- Website: www.fdjunited.com

La Française des Jeux (French pronunciation: [la fʁɑ̃sɛːz de ʒø]; FDJ) is the operator of France's and the Republic of Ireland's national lottery games, and the title sponsor of the FDJ cycling team. The name of the company loosely translates as The French Company of Games. The company was previously owned and operated by the French government. In July 2018, the French government, which owned 72% of FDJ, took the company public and sold off 50% of its ownership to bolster public finances.

In addition to lottery games, the company also provides online games and sports betting markets, such as association football, cycling, rugby union, and track and field.

The company sponsors two professional cycling teams: Groupama–FDJ in the UCI World Tour since 1997, and FDJ United–Suez in the UCI Women's World Tour since 2017.

== History ==
The French National Lottery, established in 1933, is the precursor to the current organization. Initially known as the "Société de la Loterie nationale et du Loto national" (SLNLN) in 1979, it was later renamed "France Loto" in 1989. This name change coincided with a significant restructuring of the company. The government's ownership stake increased from 51% to 72%, while ticket issuers' stake decreased from 49% to 20%. Employees and brokers were allowed to acquire stakes of 5% and 3% respectively. The capital was increased from 20 million to 500 million francs (equivalent to €3 million to 76 million), enabling significant investments. In 1991, the organization underwent another name change and became "la Française des jeux". The success of the Loto in 1976, facilitated by advancements in computer technology and televised drawings, greatly contributed to the company's revival.

Traditionally, most lotteries around the world operated within their respective territories. However, European integration and the rise of the internet disrupted this monopoly situation in European Union countries. To address this, the Française des Jeux initiated cooperation with other European state lotteries, leading to the launch of a joint drawing game called Euro Millions in collaboration with the British and Spanish lotteries. In 2004, six more countries joined the collaboration: Austria, Belgium, Ireland, Luxembourg, Portugal, and Switzerland. The missions entrusted to the Française des Jeux impose management responsibilities. In 2005, the Française des Jeux contributed €2.33 billion to public finances and provided risk coverage through deductions from bets, benefiting the state, sports, and social finances.

In 2011, its subsidiary LB POKER, jointly owned with the Barrière Group, reported a loss of €30 million.

Beginning in 2006, FDJ implemented a program called "Responsible Gaming" as part of its Corporate Social Responsibility (CSR) policy.

On 28 October 2009, the Française des Jeux announced its decision to use a shorter commercial brand name, "FDJ," in order to simplify and strengthen its image, ahead of the opening of the French online gambling market to competition. Alongside the name change, a new logo featuring a modernized four-leaf clover was unveiled.

In June 2011, Tracfin, the anti-money laundering unit of the French Ministry of Economy and Finance, reported that it had received 300 reports from the Française des Jeux for the year 2010.

In July 2015, the FDJ Board of Directors unanimously approved the strategic project for 2015–2020. The FDJ planned to invest over €400 million in technology and its physical network to accommodate the new digital usage patterns of its 27 million customers. By 2017, digital bets accounted for 11% of the total bets, a three and a half times increase compared to 2014. Over three years, bets increased by 17%, reaching €15.1 billion in 2017.

In December 2017, the French government initiated the privatization process of the Française des Jeux under the supervision of the banking group BNP Paribas. An initial public offering (IPO) was considered to take the company public, with the government retaining a "blocking minority" to ensure a minimum level of state ownership in the management. The sale of shares began in November 2019, with the state retaining a stake of approximately 20% after previously holding 72% of the capital.

In late March 2020, during the COVID-19 pandemic lockdown in France, the Française des Jeux announced significant financial losses for the upcoming year. The company anticipated a monthly loss of €55 million due to a 50% decrease in bets caused by a sharp decline in attendance.

In 2022, as lockdown measures were lifted, the Française des Jeux experienced an 8.7% increase in bets, totaling €20.6 billion. The revenue also increased by 9.1% to €2.46 billion.

On 3 November 2023 La Française des Jeux purchased Premier Lotteries Ireland DAC, the operator of the Irish National Lottery, from Ontario Teachers’ Pension Plan Board, An Post and An Post Pension Plan.

On 22 January 2024, the Française des Jeux proposed to acquire online betting firm Kindred for 27.95 billion Swedish kronor, aiming to become Europe's second-largest gaming operator and significantly expand its digital and international presence.

On 3 October 2024 the tender offer is accepted by more than 90% Kindred shareholders, thus starting a "squeeze out" process in Nasdaq Stockholm to delist Kindred.

== Retail Network ==
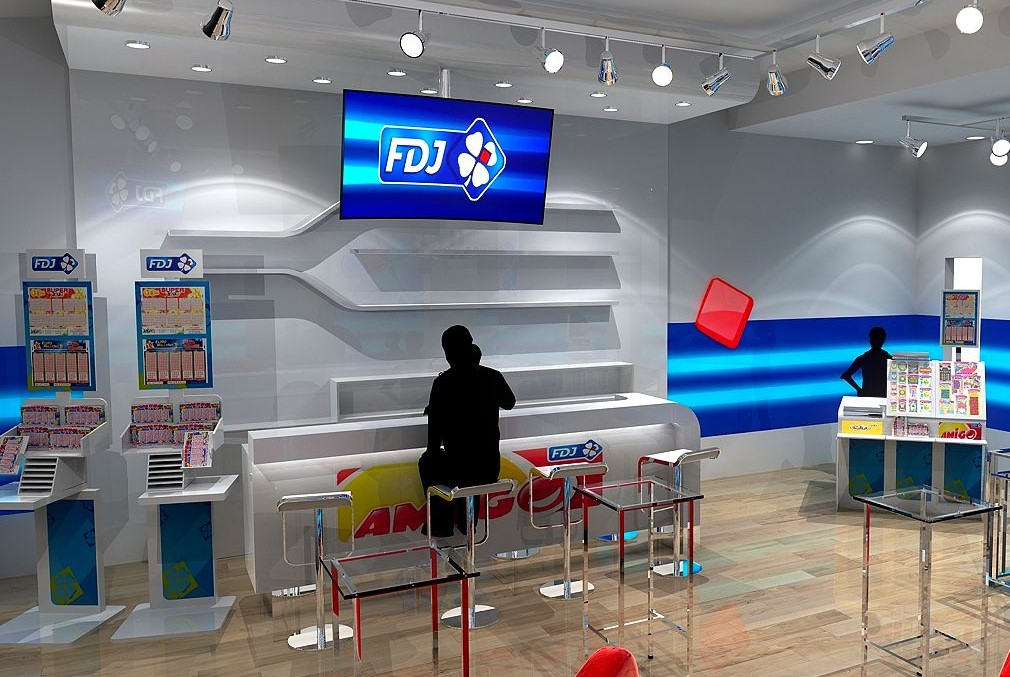
FDJ Store.

In 2017, out of the €15.1 billion generated, nearly 95% was redistributed, with 6% allocated to the retail network (€0.9 billion). This distribution includes payouts to players (66.8%, equivalent to €10.1 billion in 2017), the retail network (6%, equivalent to €0.9 billion in 2017), and the community (21.8%, equivalent to €3.3 billion). The retail network comprises 30,800 points of sale, including tobacco shops, bars, and newsagents in mainland France, as well as village grocery stores and service stations in overseas territories.

In November 2019, FDJ announced the acquisition of Bimedia, a software publisher specializing in payment and point-of-sale solutions, with the aim of supporting the development and modernization of its retail network.
