= 32Red =

British online casino company

32Red Plc
- Type: Public
- Industry: Casino
- Founded: 2002
- Headquarters: 32Red Limited, 401 World Trade Centre, Gibraltar
- Key people: Henrik Tjärnström (CEO)
- Products: Online casino
- Number of employees: 110
- Parent: Kindred Group
- Website: 32red.com

32Red is a public British online casino company located in Gibraltar. It was acquired by the Kindred Group in July 2017 for £176 million.

== Overview ==
32Red is a sports betting firm that has held a gambling licence in Gibraltar since 2002. It operates under a United Kingdom Gambling Commission licence (reference 39430). It offers over 500 casino games including blackjack and roulette, sports betting, poker, and 75-ball and 90-ball bingo variations.

The games at 32Red are provided by developers such as Microgaming, NetEnt, Big Time Gaming and Rabcat.

32Red hired British actress Patsy Kensit and television presenters Ant & Dec to be the voice of the online casino.

== Sponsorships ==
=== Football ===
32Red advertises in the Premier League through advertising boards at different grounds. It was also the kit sponsor for Aston Villa between 2006 and 2008, and from 2018. On 25 June 2009, 32Red was announced as an official main sponsor of Swansea City. The sponsorship ended early after the 2012–13 season. In a two-year deal starting in 2013, 32Red sponsored Crawley Town. In 2016, they signed a sponsorship deal with Leeds United which ended in 2021. In 2018 it signed a sponsorship deal with Middlesbrough, Derby County, and Preston North End. Former England captain Wayne Rooney's 2019 move to Derby County was enabled by 32Red who partly funded his £90,000 a week salary. Rooney's decision to wear the number 32 jersey for Derby and the sponsorship by 32Red were criticised in the media for exposing betting to children.

At the start of the 2018–19 English Championship season, 32Red were the Shirt Sponsors on 5 teams - Leeds United, Aston Villa, Derby County, Preston North End and Middlesbrough. In 2019, 32Red and Unibet signed a two-year agreement with the Vanarama National League to become its official betting partners.

The company signed a three-year deal with Scottish Championship team Rangers in April 2014. Rangers renewed the sponsorship deal in 2021.

=== Horse racing ===
32Red invest significantly in UK horse racing and are authorised betting partners of the British Horseracing Authority. 32Red has sponsored the Arena Racing Company All Weather Championships since their launch in 2014. 32Red also sponsored the twilight fixtures at Kempton Park Racecourse and in August 2016 announced their sponsorship of the Haydock Sprint Cup. In 2016, 32Red replaced William Hill as the sponsors of the King George VI Chase in a three-year deal.

== Controversies ==
In October 2010, 32Red's dispute with William Hill over the use of 32Vegas reached the High Court of Justice in London where a six-day trial took place over the matter. 32Red objected to Hill's use of the 32Vegas brand (which was renamed 21Nova subsequent to 32Red instigating legal proceedings). Handing down Judgment in January 2011, Mr Justice Henderson ruled that William Hill had infringed the 32Red trade mark and that their counterclaims against the validity of 32Red's trade marks (32 and 32Red) were dismissed.

In June 2018, the Gambling Commission fined 32Red £2 million for failing a problem gambler who had deposited £758,000 with 32Red over more than two years. 32Red had failed to check whether the customer, who had a net income of £2,150 per month, could afford the bets despite several previous regulatory rulings in this area.

In 2019, the Advertising Standards Authority sanctioned 32Red for violating the "gambling advertising code."

32Red was fined £4.1 million by the Gambling Commission for failing Anti-Money Laundering (AML) and social responsibility regulations on 25 January 2023.

== Acquisitions ==
In September 2014, 32Red Plc announced their purchase of GoWild Casino's United Kingdom-based customer database. In June 2015, 32Red Plc announced the purchase of Roxy Palace casino for £8.4 million. In March 2016, 32Red announced net gaming revenue of £48.7m in 2015, up 52% year-over-year, and revealed that it is evaluating possible acquisitions.
