= Kindred Group =

Online gambling company

Kindred Group Plc
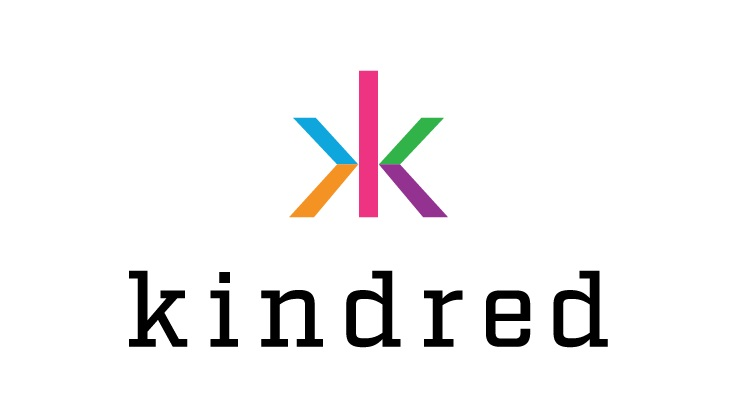
- Type: Public
- Industry: Online gambling
- Founded: 1997; 29 years ago
- Founder: Anders Ström
- Successor: FDJ United
- Headquarters: Malta
- Number of locations: Australia, Belgium, Denmark, Estonia, France, Gibraltar, Guernsey, Italy, Malta, Sweden, UK, Romania
- Key people: Nils Anden (CEO)
- Revenue: £751.4 million (2017)
- Number of employees: 2348
- Website: www.kindredgroup.com

Kindred Group (formerly Unibet Group Plc) is an online gambling operator comprising nine brands, including Unibet, Maria Casino, Vlad Cazino and 32Red. The group offers online casino, online poker, online bingo and sports betting products. It is registered in Malta, with additional offices in Gibraltar, London and Stockholm. Kindred Group was listed on the Stockholm Stock Exchange until its acquisition by La Française des Jeux (FDJ) in October 2024.

== History ==
In 2011, Unibet was granted one of 48 licenses issued under Denmark's newly regulated gambling market.

In 2012, Unibet acquired the Danish bookmaker Bet24.

On 19 May 2014, Unibet's shareholders approved the spin-off of its business-to-business subsidiary, Kambi Group Plc. Kindred retained a distributed 95 per cent stake, and Kambi began trading independently on the NASDAQ OMX Stockholm First North on 2 June 2014.

Effective 31 December 2014, Unibet acquired Bingo.com Ltd.'s domain and real-money gambling business for $8 million. The price was paid partly in cash and partly through the redemption of Unibet's 15,000,000 shares in Bingo.com at $0.40 each.

In July 2015, Unibet acquired the online business of StanJames.com for a reported £19 million, excluding the Stan James high-street betting shops, which were rebranded Megabet. The StanJames.com brand was discontinued on 26 February 2018, with customer accounts transferred to Kindred Group.

On 14 November 2016, Unibet became the first gambling operator to integrate the Swedish electronic identification service BankID. The following month, shareholders approved renaming the company Kindred Group Plc, citing a shift toward a multi-brand strategy.

In February 2017, Kindred Group acquired the Gibraltar-based operator 32Red for approximately £176 million. The acquisition was completed in June 2017.

In January 2018, Kindred launched an online gambling ad-blocking tool developed with Betfilter, intended to prevent self-excluded customers from being shown gambling advertisements.

Kindred entered the United States sports betting market in August 2018 through a partnership with the Hard Rock Hotel & Casino Atlantic City in New Jersey. In January 2019, Kindred formed a similar partnership with Mohegan Sun Pocono to enter the Pennsylvania market. Following a strategic review launched in April 2023, Kindred announced in November 2023 that it would exit all North American markets by the second quarter of 2024. The exit was accompanied by a reduction of more than 300 corporate positions and projected annual cost savings of approximately £40 million.

In its third-quarter 2024 report, Kindred Group recorded total revenue of £294.5 million, a 4 per cent increase year-on-year. Underlying EBITDA rose 49 per cent to £63.4 million. Active customers increased 9 per cent to 1,701,100. In October 2024, FDJ completed its acquisition of Kindred Group after its tender offer secured more than 90 per cent of Kindred's outstanding share capital.

== Controversies and regulatory actions ==
=== United Kingdom ===
In March 2023, the UK Gambling Commission fined Kindred subsidiaries 32Red Limited and Platinum Gaming Limited a combined £7.1 million for social responsibility and anti-money laundering failings, and issued both with official warnings.

=== Norway ===
Norway's gambling authority Lotteritilsynet imposed a coercive fine of NOK 1.198 million per day in September 2022 against Kindred's Malta-licensed subsidiary Trannel International unless it ceased offering online gambling to Norwegian residents. The fine was to continue until Trannel's estimated annual gross profit in Norway was reached or the company withdrew. The regulator paused and restarted the daily fines over 2022-2023 as Trannel adjusted its position pending appeals. Following the dispute, Lotteritilsynet stated in September 2023 that Kindred would withdraw from the country.

=== Sweden ===
Kindred's Swedish subsidiary Spooniker Ltd received a SEK 100 million sanction fee in 2020 for violations of Sweden's bonus rules. The Administrative Court of Appeal reduced the fee to SEK 50 million and then to SEK 30 million in May 2024. In May 2025, the Swedish Gambling Authority (Spelinspektionen) issued Spooniker a further warning and a SEK 10 million penalty for deficiencies in customer due diligence and anti-money-laundering controls. In July 2026, an administrative court in Linköping dismissed Spooniker's appeal and upheld the fine, along with related anti-money-laundering fines against operators Betsson and Snabbare.

=== Netherlands ===
On 18 December 2024, the Dutch gambling regulator Kansspelautoriteit fined Optdeck Service Limited, operator of Kindred's Unibet in the Netherlands, €400,000 for allowing players listed in the national self-exclusion register Cruks to register and gamble during late 2022 and early 2023.

=== Denmark ===
In December 2021 and February 2022, Denmark's gambling authority Spillemyndigheden issued orders and warnings to Unibet (Denmark) Limited for breaches of customer due diligence and anti-money-laundering requirements, citing failures to obtain sufficient source-of-funds information and to investigate high-risk activity.

== Sponsorship ==
Kindred's Unibet brand has been the front-of-shirt sponsor of Scottish football club Rangers since 2021, with the 32Red brand sponsoring the club's training kit. The agreement was extended in September 2024 to run through the 2028-29 season.
