= LeoVegas =

Swedish mobile gaming company

LeoVegas AB
- Type: Subsidiary
- ISIN: SE0008091904
- Industry: Online gambling
- Founded: 2011; 15 years ago
- Founders: Gustaf Hagman; Robin Ramm-Ericson
- Headquarters: Sweden
- Number of locations: Stockholm, Group HQ; Malta, Gaming Ltd
- Areas served: Nordics, United Kingdom, Europe
- Key people: Mattias Wedar (CEO)
- Products: LeoVegas Casino; LeoVegas Live Casino; LeoVegas Sportsbook
- Revenue: €327,8M
- Number of employees: 1,900+
- Parent: MGM Resorts International
- Website: www.leovegasgroup.com

LeoVegas AB is a Swedish mobile gaming company and provider of online casino and sports betting services such as table games, video slots, progressive jackpots, video poker and live betting to a number of international markets. LeoVegas Gaming Ltd. is a subsidiary of MGM Resorts International.

== Corporate history ==
Leovegas was founded in 2011 by Gustaf Hagman (CEO) and Robin Ramm-Ericson (Chairman of the Board & Managing Director).

LeoVegas experienced rapid growth due to the overriding increase in smartphone use and the "mobile first" mentality of its founders. Hagman stated that the company "was born out of the smartphone, which today is the fastest-growing channel for entertainment." As a result, the company has over 700 employees working for the provider.

The initial stock market offering of the company took place on 17 March 2016. Financial advisers in the transaction were Carnegie Investment Bank and SEB, as Joint Global Coordinators and Book-runners. The legal advisers were Baker McKenzie, while Avanza Bank AB was appointed as LeoVegas' certified adviser. At the time of the initial listing, the company's stock was heavily oversubscribed.

In advance of the initial public offering (IPO), LeoVegas announced a 124% increase in annual revenue of €83m for 2015 compared to €37m 2014. Depositing customers for both years and 2013 were as follows: 54,283 (2013), 100, 745 (2014), 202,498 (2015).

On 13 May 2016, one month before the UEFA Euro 2016 football tournament, LeoVegas launched its sports betting product LeoVegas Sport. At the time of launch, CEO of LeoVegas Gaming Ltd. Johan Styren stated that fast loading speeds and the mobile-first approach would be integral to growth in the live betting market for mobile.

On 7 July 2016, LeoVegas obtainined a gaming license in Denmark.

On 1 March 2017 LeoVegas acquired 100% of the Italian operator Winga s.r.l. for a reported fee of €6 million, entering the Italian online gambling market. The Italian online platform and website became fully operative on 17 November 2017.

On 17 March 2017, LeoVegas was listed on Nasdaq First North Premier.

On 27 October 2017, LeoVegas acquired Royal Panda for a reported fee of €60m as part of the company's expansion into regulated markets.

On 8 December 2017, LeoVentures acquired a 51% majority stake in GameGrounds United, owner of the Casino Grounds streaming network.

On 5 February 2018, LeoVegas changed to Nasdaqs Main Market list in Stockholm.

On 7 February 2018, LeoVegas acquired German licenses.

On 5 March 2018, LeoVegas acquired a fast growing casino operator in UK, today called Rocket X.

On 13 September 2018, LeoVentures acquired 51% of the shares in Pixel Holding Group Ltd, which runs the esports betting operator Pixel.bet. Pixel.bet has a five-year license on the Swedish market.

On 30 November 2018, LeoVegas was among the first to receive a gambling licence in Sweden.

In October 2019, LeoVegas were granted a five-year operating licence in Sweden. On 1 January 2019, Sweden became a regulated market and LeoVegas had a license from day one.

In March 2021, LeoVegas agreed a deal to purchase Expekt for €5m. The acquisition was completed in May 2021.

In May 2021, LeoVegas joined The Netherlands Online Gambling Association (NOGA). LeoVegas also introduced instant and individually personalised deposit limits across its UK brand portfolio on same month.

In May 2022, MGM Resorts International announced an offer to acquire LeoVegas in a deal worth $607 million and received all approvals needed to commence their acquisition by 7 September 2022.

== Operations ==
The company headquarters are in Stockholm, whereas the brand "LeoVegas" is owned by LeoVegas Gaming Ltd. which is based in Malta. Technical development is conducted by a further subsidiary of the group, Gears of Leo, based in Sweden. The company has offices in Italy, UK and Poland.

The online casino and sports betting products are licensed and regulated under the service of the Maltese Lottery and Gaming Authority (MGA). In the United Kingdom, the company operates in compliance with UK Gambling Commission requirements and in Sweden under the service of Spelinspektionen. In addition, it has obtained authorization in 2019 from the Dirección General de Ordenación del Juego (DGOJ).

LeoVegas' core markets are the United Kingdom and Nordic countries, namely Sweden, Norway, Denmark and Finland. The company also has a presence in other European countries Spain, Italy. In addition, LeoVegas has a presence in the Latin American countries Chile and Peru, and in Canada.

LeoVegas offers a number of casino games from game providers including NetEnt, Yggdrasil, Evolution Gaming, IGT, Play N’ Go, Playtech, Microgaming, Authentic Gaming, Bally and WMS. Some of the casino games offered are roulette, blackjack, baccarat and Caribbean stud poker.

The LeoVegas sportsbook uses the Kambi platform for front end user interface, odds compilation and customer intelligence.

== Partnerships ==
On 19 June 2017, LeoVegas signed a two-year deal with EFL Championship club Brentford to become both their new shirt and title sponsor. They followed this up a week later, on 26 June, by signing a three-year deal with Norwich City. In 2023, the company became the shirt sponsor of Blackpool.

In March 2021, LeoVegas agreed a deal with Italian Serie A club A.S. Roma to become the club's official Online Infotainment Partner. Strengthening their presence in Serie A, LeoVegas also became official Top Sponsors of Atalanta BC later in 2021. The partnership agreement between LeoVegas and Atalanta BC was renewed ahead of the 2024/25 season.

In August 2021, Leo vegas announced its partnership deal with Esports data and technology company Abios. The agreement allowed LeoVegas access to Abios’ real time widgets and apps to aid in user engagement with their esports offerings.

== Awards ==
At the Global Gaming Awards London 2021, LeoVegas won the "Online Casino of the Year" award for the fourth time in a row.

LeoVegas picked up the Mobile Casino Product of the Year at the 2021 EGR Operator Awards.

In April 2022 the company won for the fifth time the "Online Casino of the Year Award" at the Global Gaming Awards held in London, for the fifth consecutive time.

In February 2023, LeoVegas scooped the 'Online Casino of the Year' award at the 2023 Global Gaming Awards in London.

In October 2023, LeoVegas won 'Operator of the Year' at the EGR Operator Awards 2023.

In January 2026, LeoVegas won 'Mobile Operator of the Year' at the IGA Awards 2026.

== Critics ==
=== United Kingdom ===
In 2021 LeoVegas was fined £600,000 (€680,500) by the Gambling Commission (GC) over "failings" related to misleading advertising and the handling of customers. Specifically, 41 misleading adverts were identified that were sanctioned by the operator, as well as evidence of the mistreatment of customers at the end of their self-exclusion period. A review found that LeoVegas failed to return funds to 11,205 customers when they chose to self-exclude and close their accounts, while marketing material was sent to 1,894 people who had previously self-excluded. LeoVegas allowed 413 previously self-excluded customers to gamble, without speaking to them first or applying a 24-hour cooling off period.
