= BetBright =

Irish online gambling company

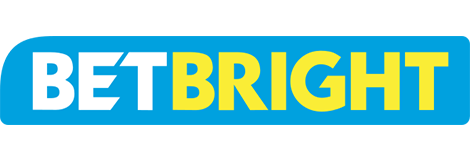
- Industry: Gambling
- Headquarters: Dublin, Republic of Ireland
- Key people: Executive Chairman - Rich Ricci; CEO - Marcus Brennan
- Products: Sports betting Casino; Games
- Owner: Dedsert (Ireland) Limited
- Website: www.betbright.com

BetBright was a digital entertainment and online sports betting company based in Dublin and operating in the UK and Republic of Ireland.

As of 5 March 2019, Betbright ceased gambling operations on a permanent basis after the company was bought by 888 Holdings for £15m.

== History ==
BetBright was founded in 2013, by Marcus Brennan, Richard Brennan, Gary Hunter and Tadhg O'Toole.

The company develop and operate its own sports betting and online casino platforms, instead of using a white-label system delivered by another provider.

On 6 November 2014, BetBright announced the addition of its online casino product to complement the existing sports betting platform.

In 2015, BetBright expanded on their sports betting by incorporating a range of virtual games from Betradar.

On 30 January 2016, prominent racehorse owner and businessman Rich Ricci was unveiled as the new Executive Chairman of the company.

In November 2016, BetBright's focus on internal product development resulted in them winning the "Best In-House Product" award at the 2016 EGR operator awards, this was followed up soon after by winning the "Best Football Betting Product" award at the annual SBC industry awards a month later.

On 22 August 2017, BetBright announced the hiring of ex Poker Stars Director, Sarne Lightman as the new MD of Sportsbook and Casino.

In February 2018, BetBright announced growth plans as it aims to be a "disrupter" in the gambling sector, with ambitions to add almost 130,000 new customers in 2018 and forecast doubling in revenues from €14m in 2017 to €29m in 2018.

In June 2018, BetBright was recognised for its creativity and innovation in online gambling following the development of their ‘recommendations engine’ – a first for the gambling sector. - winning the "Innovation in sports betting" award at the 2018 EGR Marketing & Innovation Awards 2018.

In March 2019, BetBright was sold to 888 Holdings for £15m, a deal which sparked controversy when the sale announcement included a link to an "FAQ" site that said "all bets due to settle after 5 March at 23:59pm will be voided." This affects all season long bets on the Premier League.

== Awards ==
Year	Awarded By	Category	Result
2016	eGaming Review (EGR)	Best In-house Product	Won
2016	Sports Betting Community (SBC)	Best Football Betting Product	Won
2016	eGaming Review (EGR)	Rising Star	Shortlisted
2018	eGaming Review (EGR)	Innovation in Sports Betting	Won

== Sponsorships ==
=== BetBright Cup ===
In January 2015, BetBright embarked on a three-year sponsorship deal with Cheltenham racecourse to include four of the seven races on the New Years Day card; as well as the feature race on Trials Day; and the BetBright Cup throughout the Cheltenham Festival.

The BetBright Cup (formerly the Prestbury Cup) is the competition between Irish trained horses and British trained horses at the Cheltenham Festival. The trophy is awarded to the country with the most number of Cheltenham Festival horse race winners.

In January 2016, it was announced that Hector Ó hEochagáin would captain the Irish side, while Robert "Choc" Thornton would captain the British side. The series ended in a draw between both countries.

In February 2017, it was announced that Hector Ó hEochagáin would reprise his role as Irish captain, while Phil Tufnell would take over the role of British captain throughout the Festival. BetBright also announced a prize fund of £10,000 to be paid to the Injured Jockeys Fund in the country of the winning team. The series ended with Ireland beating the British team on a scoreline of 19–9.

In February 2018, it was announced that Ex England cricket spin bowler Phil Tufnell and former snooker star Ken Doherty were the BetBright Cup captains of Great Britain and Ireland, respectively.

=== BAMMA sponsorship ===
In July 2017, BetBright was unveiled as the official betting partner of Europe's biggest MMA promotion at BAMMA29 in Dublin.

=== Nottingham Forest ===
On 13 June 2018, BetBright were announced as the official shirt sponsor for EFL Championship club Nottingham Forest for their 2018–19 season. The deal was said to be the most "significant front-of-shirt agreement in the club's history". The BetBright company logo will be displayed on the front of all of Nottingham Forest's playing kits for the coming 2018/19 season. BetBright have even agreed to slightly alter the colouring of their logo, to all-white branding, in order to maintain the traditional colour scheme of Nottingham Forest’s Garibaldi red shirt.

== Ambassadors ==
Hector Ó hEochagáin, Robert "Choc" Thornton, Phil Tufnell and Ken Doherty have all held the role of BetBright Cup captains.

In addition, BetBright have enlisted the services of veteran TV presenter Nick Luck as a regular horse racing pundit.

Former professional footballer Jimmy Bullard has been a football ambassador for BetBright since the 2016–17 Premier League season, writing a weekly blog column.

=== Football World Cup 2018 ===
In June 2018, BetBright hired Rebekah Vardy - wife of England forward Jamie Vardy - as a VAR expert for the tournament, alongside former Premier League referee, Mark Halsey.
