= William Hill (bookmaker) =

Bookmakers in the United Kingdom

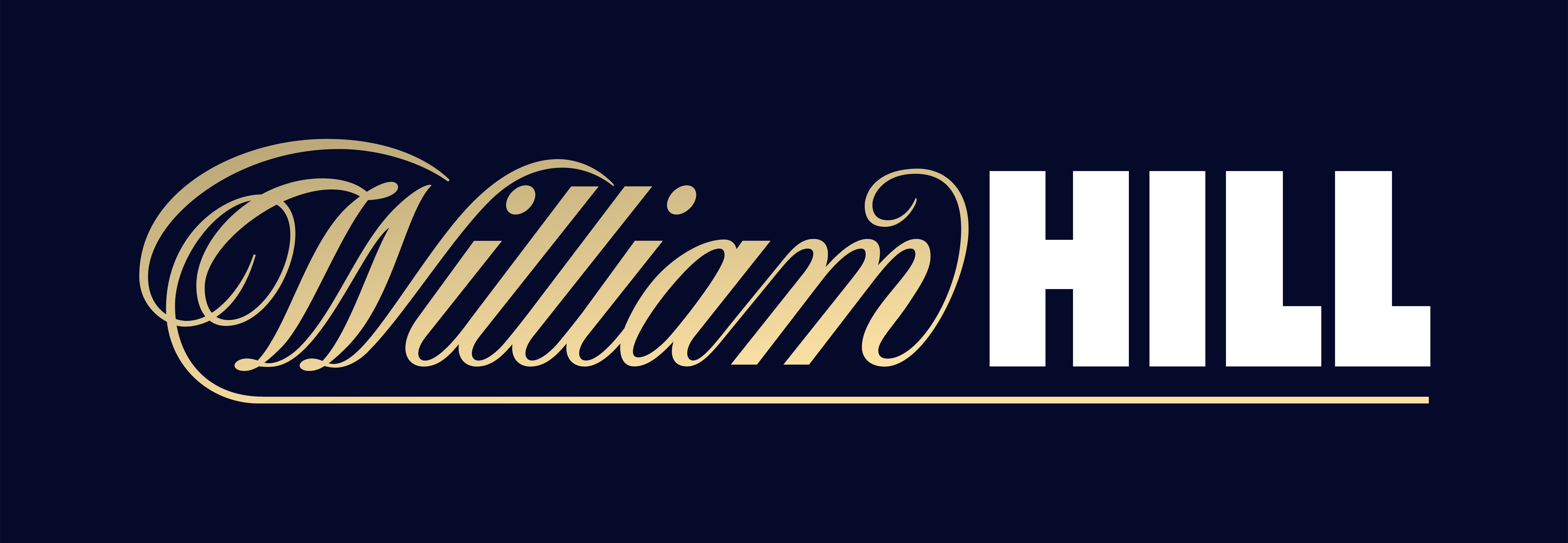
- Type: Subsidiary
- Industry: Gambling
- Founded: 1934
- Founder: William Hill
- Headquarters: London, England
- Key people: Jonathan Mendelsohn (Chairman); Per Widerström (CEO)
- Products: Sports betting, online casino, online poker, online bingo
- Number of employees: 12,000 (2021)
- Parent: Evoke plc
- Website: Official website

William Hill is a British gambling company founded in 1934. Its product offering includes sports betting, online casino, online poker, and online bingo. Business operations are led from its headquarters in London, with a satellite office in Malta. The company was previously listed on the London Stock Exchange until it was acquired by Caesars Entertainment in April 2021. In July 2022, William Hill was subsequently bought by 888 Holdings (now Evoke plc) for £2.2 billion.

== History ==
The company was founded by William Hill in 1934. By the 1960s, it had become the largest bookmaker in the world. In December 1966, it bought the betting shop business of Jack Swift, including his 18 betting shops, mostly located in the West End of London, which became William Hill's first betting shops, for £825,000. Swift continued to manage the shops. In 1970, William Hill retired and died the following year and the business was acquired by Sears Holdings.

The business was acquired by Grand Metropolitan, which also owned Mecca Bookmakers, in 1988. It was acquired again the following year by Brent Walker. In September 1996, Brent Walker recouped £117m of the £685m it had paid for William Hill when Grand Metropolitan was found to have exaggerated the company's profits at the time of the sale.

Japanese investment bank Nomura mounted a £700m leveraged buyout of William Hill in 1997. In February 1999, a proposed stock market flotation was abandoned due to "weak interest" and Nomura sold the company to funds managed by private equity firms Cinven and CVC Capital Partners for £825m instead.

The company was eventually listed on the London Stock Exchange in 2002. The following year chief executive David Harding was awarded a £2.84m bonus, making him the UK's fifth highest paid company director in 2003. It acquired Sunderland Greyhound Stadium in 2002 and Newcastle Greyhound Stadium in 2003. In June 2004 Harding sold £5.2m of shares to fund his divorce, precipitating a decline in the company's stock that wiped £75 million off the value of the company. In 2005, William Hill bought 624 betting offices in the UK, Republic of Ireland, Isle of Man and Jersey from Stanley Leisure for £504 million: the acquisition briefly took the company past Ladbrokes into first position in the UK betting market in terms of shops but not revenue. The Office of Fair Trading made William Hill sell 78 of the 624 Stanley shops due to concerns over anti-competitive practices.

In November 2008, William Hill went into partnership with Orbis (latterly OpenBet), and Israeli software company Playtech, to remedy its own failing online operation. The same month, analysts at UBS noted "concern" at the company's level of debt, which stood at over £1 billion and was later reported as £1.5 billion. In 2009, the company enacted both a rights issue and a corporate bond issue, in an effort to restructure its debt.

From 2001 until 2009, William Hill paid George Howarth, a Member of Parliament, £30,000 to act as a parliamentary adviser. While on William Hill's payroll he tabled amendments to the 2003 budget proposing tougher levels of taxation for person-to-person betting exchanges. Howarth left the role in the wake of the 2009 expenses scandal.

Under the terms of the deal, William Hill paid Playtech's founder Teddy Sagi £144.5 million for various assets and affiliate companies. These included several online casino sites which William Hill continues to run under the name WHG. Playtech took a 29% stake in the new William Hill Online entity. The company wrote-off a reported £26m when scrapping its previous in-house system. In June 2009 William Hill backed Playtech despite its partner having a quarter of its stock market value wiped out following a profits warning.

In 2013, William Hill paid £424 million ($643 million) for full control of its online business marking an accelerated expansion and resulted in the dissolution of the partnership with Playtech. In May 2015, William Hill presented prototype of "Get In The Race" – a virtual horse racing application. On 2 August 2016, it acquired Grand Parade, the betting and gaming digital solutions company for £13.6 million in cash and shares.

In 2018, William Hill was fined £6.2 million by the Gambling Commission for systematic failures regarding anti-money laundering and problem gambling. The operator was found to have accepted large deposits of cash linked to criminal activity between 2014 and 2016, resulting in £1.2 million in financial gains. William Hill was ordered to return the £1.2 million profit, plus pay a penalty of £5 million for breaching regulations.

On 7 January 2019, William Hill received regulatory approval to conclude its purchase of Mr Green for £242 million. On 17 July 2020, William Hill raised £224 million in a new ordinary share rights issue to provide a timely capital boost during the COVID-19 pandemic. In August 2020, as a result of the economic effects caused by the COVID-19 pandemic, the company announced that it would close 119 shops permanently. Despite that, only 16 employees would lose their job positions, while the others would be assigned to new positions. It also announced that the firm would be merging its retail and online operations.

On 30 September 2020, William Hill agreed to a £2.9 billion takeover bid by Caesars Entertainment, the Nevada-based casino operator. The deal was unanimously recommended by the UK company's directors. It came after two rival bids by the US private equity group Apollo were turned down. In April 2021, Caesars completed its acquisition of William Hill and the company was delisted from the London Stock Exchange.

As Caesars was interested only in William Hill's industry expertise and its US operations, the European business was put up for sale, attracting bids from 888 Holdings, Apollo, and CVC. In September 2021, Caesars agreed to sell the European business to 888 Holdings for £2.2 billion. However, in July 2022, 888 reduced its offer to £1.95 billion and this was accepted. The sale was completed in July 2022.

On 28 March 2023, the UK Gambling Commission ordered three William Hill Group companies—WHG (International) Limited, Mr Green Limited, and William Hill Organization Limited—to pay a record £19.2 million for social responsibility and anti-money laundering failures. Commenting on the penalty package, Andrew Rhodes, Gambling Commission chief executive, said: "When we launched this investigation the failings we uncovered were so widespread and alarming serious consideration was given to licence suspension. However, because the operator immediately recognised their failings and worked with us to swiftly implement improvements, we instead opted for the largest enforcement payment in our history."

In December 2024, William Hill announced it would cease operations in 13 countries: Angola, Bolivia, Burkina Faso, Cameroon, Kenya, Mozambique, Nepal, Nicaragua, Nigeria, Republic of the Congo, Democratic Republic of the Congo, Somalia, and Vietnam. Existing bets were to be settled by 2 December, with customers able to withdraw their remaining funds until 5 January 2025.

== UK operations ==
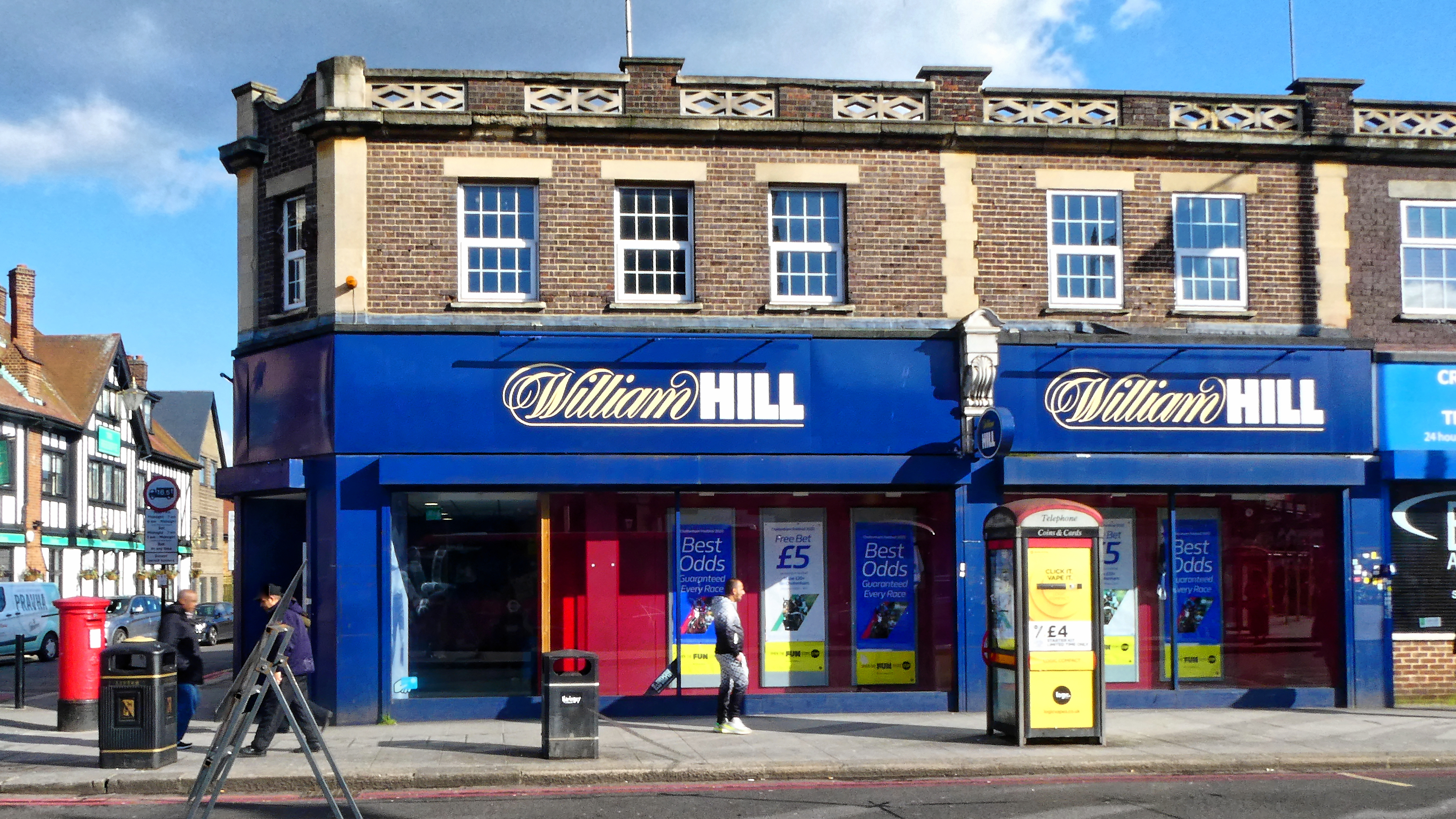
A William Hill betting shop in Tottenham, London in 2020

William Hill employs approximately 12,000 people, 8,000 of them in the UK. The company operates 1,414 betting shops. In addition to its online sportsbook operations, the company offers online casino games, skill games, online bingo and online poker. Since the Gambling Act 2005, gaming machines have strengthened profits to counteract falling revenues in other areas. In 2009, the company moved its online betting operations to Gibraltar to reduce its taxes by millions of pounds.

In August 2010, William Hill launched a training programme for its 10,000+ workforce to combat underage gambling in its retail outlets.

In 2019, William Hill became a founding member of the Betting and Gaming Council. In July 2019, William Hill announced it was closing 700 betting shops, saying this was because of the decision three months before to reduce the maximum stake on fixed-odds betting terminals to £2. In August 2020, the company said it would close a further 119 shops that were not profitable during the COVID-19 pandemic. At the same time, the company returned £24.5 million in furlough funds it had received from the government.

The company confirmed in 2018 that UK operations will continue to be managed from Gibraltar.

== Outside the United Kingdom ==
In March 2009, William Hill closed 14 of its shops in the Republic of Ireland with the loss of 53 jobs. In February 2010 it announced that the remaining 36 Irish shops were "under review" pending the possible introduction of controversial gaming machines to Irish shops. In 2011, William Hill sold its remaining betting shops in Ireland to BoyleSports because of what a William Hill employee described as "the restrictive nature" of the laws governing retail betting in Ireland.

William Hill had pulled out of Italy in 2008 after just two years, a failure which cost the company £1m in wasted investment. The company's joint venture in Spain ended in January 2010 with partners Codere buying William Hill's 50% stakeholding for €1, after both parties had invested an initial €10 million in April 2008. William Hill lost £11.6m in 2008 and £9.3m in 2009 on the venture.

In June 2012, William Hill expanded to Nevada, the only U.S. state that then allowed full-fledged sports wagering, buying three chains of sportsbooks: Lucky's, Leroy's, and the satellite operations of Club Cal Neva, for a total of $53 million. The deals at the time gave the company control of 55 per cent of the state's sportsbook locations, and 11 per cent of statewide book revenue. All three chains were to be rebranded under the William Hill name.

In 2013, three Australian brands, Sportingbet, Centrebet and Tom Waterhouse, were purchased by the company and later rebranded as William Hill Australia in 2015. Both Sportingbet and Centrebet were acquired in March of the year for $660m and $132m, respectively, while tomwaterhouse.com was brought in during August 2013, for an initial $34m. Tom Waterhouse was appointed chief executive officer of William Hill Australia in July 2014.

In March 2018, William Hill sanctioned the sale of its Australian business to CrownBet holdings for an estimated value of AU $300 million. The sale ended the company's time in Australia after entering the market in 2012. In preparation for Brexit, in June 2018, William Hill announced that it is opening a new satellite office in Malta.

Following the decision of the US Supreme Court regarding the case of Murphy v. National Collegiate Athletic Association in June 2018, the state of New Jersey effectively legalised gambling on athletic events due to a previously successful state ballot initiative. William Hill entered arrangements to provide bookmaking services to both Monmouth Park Racetrack and Ocean Resort Casino in the state of New Jersey.

On 3 August 2020, the bookmaker opened the first full-service betting operation housing professional sports teams in the U.S. at Capital One Arena in Washington, D.C.

In January 2021, a joint venture between William Hill and Argenbingo received a licence to offer online gambling services in the Argentinean province of Buenos Aires. On 5 May 2021, William Hill launched in Colombia following the acquisition of a majority stake in Alfabet.

== Sponsorship ==
In March 2007, William Hill threatened to withdraw its sponsorship of various horse races, in its dispute with racecourses over TurfTV. William Hill subscribed to the channel in January 2008.

Away from horse racing, William Hill has sponsored many other sporting events, including the Scottish Cup from 2011 to 2020, the PDC World Darts Championship from 2015 to 2022 and the Scottish Professional Football League since 2024. The company also sponsors the annual William Hill Sports Book of the Year award, dedicated to rewarding excellence in sports writing.

== Advertising ==
In May 2008, The Advertising Standards Authority (ASA) banned William Hill from running a television advert which it found "condoned gambling behaviour that was socially irresponsible". In October 2009, the ASA banned a poster and national press advertisement which promised "£100 of free bets". The ad was found to be "likely to mislead" and in breach of a Committee of Advertising Practice code relating to "truthfulness".

In March 2010, an advert stating "William Hill best prices fact" was banned by the ASA. It had breached several Committee of Advertising Practice codes, including those relating to "substantiation", "truthfulness" and "honesty". In September 2011, William Hill made a television advert featuring the 2005 single "A Bit Patchy". In December 2012, adverts stating "Best Prices on the Best Horses" and "Best Prices on the Best Teams" were banned by the ASA. It had breached several Committee of Advertising Practice code, including those relating to "misleading advertising", "Substantiation" and "Comparisons". The ASA also banned a different advert claiming "Best Odds Guaranteed" because it was misleading.

In June 2021, William Hill launched its new master brand. As part of the relaunch, the company launched a new TV advert featuring its brand ambassadors Tony McCoy, Robbie Savage, Rio Ferdinand and Jermaine Jenas and used the Neil Diamond song Sweet Caroline.

== Criticism ==
Scientific papers dealing with the statistics of sports betting mention that William Hill blocks customers or limits their stakes if William Hill gets the impression that they may try to benefit from arbitrage.

== See also ==
- Calvert v. William Hill
- Menashe v. William Hill
