= 888sport =

Online sports gambling company

- Industry: Gambling
- Founded: 2008; 18 years ago
- Headquarters: Gibraltar
- Area served: Worldwide
- Products: Sports betting
- Parent: Evoke plc
- Website: www.888sport.com

888sport is an international sports betting brand owned by Evoke plc. It was founded in 2008, and is headquartered in Gibraltar. The company provides online sports betting, predominantly in European markets.

== History ==
888sport was launched as the dedicated sports arm of 888 Holdings in March 2008, and as part of 888's gambling arm. 888sport began to get involved in sports sponsorship in 2010, starting with a sponsored stand at Fontwell Park Racecourse. Former Spanish national team footballer Santiago Cañizares joined 888sport in 2011 as European brand ambassador, in 2012, English former professional footballer Ian Wright as pundit during UEFA Euro 2012, and Channel 4 Racing presenter Emma Spencer joined in 2014 as horse racing expert. 888sport received media coverage for the way it utilised social media prior to and during the fight between George Groves and Carl Froch fight in 2014.

In 2013, the Nevada Gaming Commission licensed 888 Holdings to provide online gaming, making it one of the first non-US online betting companies to operate in the United States. 888sport is a member of ESSA, the European betting integrity body. In March 2019, 888 paid £15 million for Dublin-based Dedsert Ltd, which provided the sportsbook platform for UK-licensed bookmaker BetBright. 888 CEO Itai Pazner said the acquisition "gives us the missing piece in our proprietary and technology portfolio." In 2018, 888sport partnered with Caesars Atlantic City Casino to offer online sports betting to residents of New Jersey. In 2024, Evoke reported roughly £1.75 billion in revenue and an adjusted EBITDA of about £312 million, despite a net loss of £191 million driven by integration and transformation expenses, including debt from the William Hill acquisition.

== Regulatory issues ==
In August 2017, 888Sport was fined £7.8 million by the UK Gambling Commission after a system error allowed self-excluded customers to continue gambling; part of the fine funded reimbursements and social initiatives. In March 2022, 888 UK Ltd received a £9.4 million fine for breaches of anti‑money laundering and social responsibility rules, including delayed AML checks and inadequate customer protection during the COVID‑19 lockdown, accompanied by an official warning and mandatory audits. In 2024, 888Sport was blacklisted by the Dominican Republic along with other major operators under its re-regulated gambling framework.

== Sponsorships ==
888sport sponsorships include:

- Nottingham Forest F.C. (2016–18)
- Birmingham City F.C. (2016–19)
- Brentford F.C. (2016–17)
- Preston North End F.C. (2016–17)
- Shamrock Rovers F.C. (2021–23)
