= Unibet =

Online gambling company

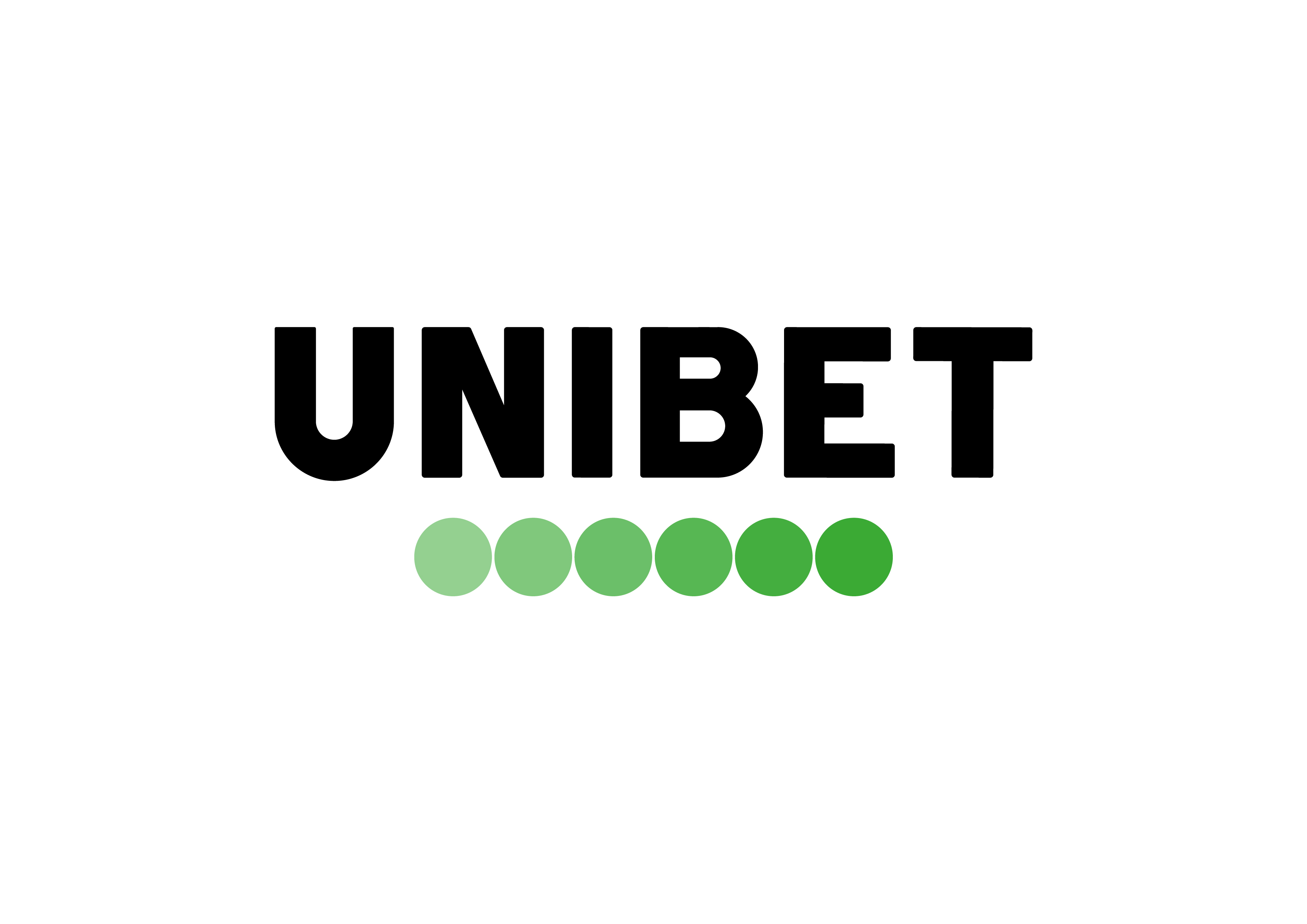
- Type: Public
- Industry: Online gambling
- Founded: 1997
- Founder: Anders Ström
- Headquarters: Malta
- Number of locations: Australia, Belgium, Denmark, Estonia, France, Gibraltar, Italy, Malta, UK, US, Romania
- Key people: Nils Andén (CEO)
- Products: Sportsbook, Casino & Games, Poker, Bingo
- Revenue: £751 million (2017)
- Number of employees: 1600
- Website: www.unibet.com

Unibet is a sports betting, online casino, bingo and online poker platform. Unibet is a part of Kindred Group–an online gambling operator which consists of 11 brands along with Maria Casino, Stan James, www.vladcazino.ro, 32Red, www.32.rosu and iGame. Today, Unibet has over 1,600 employees and offices in Malta, London, New York, and Gibraltar among others. Unibet launched its first online website in 1999, launched live betting service in 2003 and introduced mobile site in 2004.

== Overview ==
The Kindred Group, and by extension Unibet, is headquartered in Malta.

This arrangement allows Unibet to be licensed, through Platinum Gaming Limited, by the Government of Gibraltar (under Licence numbers RGL 091 & RGL 092) and regulated by the Gibraltar Gambling Commissioner for the purposes of serving customers around Europe. In order to legally offer online gambling services to UK based customers Platinum Gaming Limited – and therefore Unibet – also hold a Combined Continuation Remote Operating License (number 000-045322-R-324275-001) from the UK Gambling Commission (UKGC).

== History ==
Unibet was originally founded in 1997 by Anders Ström, with the company initially operating out of Ström's home in Earl's Court, London. It secured a license to operate a betting business and from 1998, Unibet began taking bets over the phone. The following year, Unibet launched their first ever online betting website. It later became Unibet Group PLC, Pontus Lesse was appointed as the new CEO and the company were granted their first international gambling license in Malta.

Over the next few years, Unibet Group PLC expanded quickly. Its Unibet website diversified to support 12 different languages and by 2004, the company had over 300,000 registered customers in more than 100 countries. It was also in that year that the company was first listed on the Swedish Stock Exchange.

The following years saw a number of other acquisitions by the company, including most notably those of Betchoice in Australia and of Stan James Online. In order to better support their new multi-brand strategy, Unibet Group Plc became the Kindred Group in 2016. Since that time, the company have passed one million registered customers and launched a range of further betting and gambling brands around the world. In the middle of November 2019, the Kindred Group went live with Unibet in Pennsylvania (PA).

== Sponsorship ==
Unibet sponsors a wide range of major sports teams and events, including partnerships with Middlesbrough FC, Philadelphia Eagles, Pittsburgh Steelers, Glasgow Rangers, Club Brugge, FC Copenhagen, Sydney Roosters, AFC Ajax, FC Botoșani and FC Hermannstadt in Romania, professional cycling team Unibet Tietema Rockets and five-time World Chess Champion Magnus Carlsen.

== Awards ==
Unibet has been awarded as the best sports betting operator in 2006, 2008 and 2009, as well as a live betting operator in 2009 by PCM magazine “eGaming Overview.”

Sportsbook Operator of the Year - IGA Awards 2014. Followed by a few months later Unibet conquers Best Poker Marketing Campaign - EGR Awards 2014.

== Regulatory sanctions and fines ==
On February 16, 2022, the Danish Gambling Authority (DGA) ordered Unibet (Denmark) Limited to update its risk assessment policies. According to the regulator, until 25 January 2022, Unibet did not have "sufficient written business procedures for ongoing monitoring of existing customer relations". A number of breaches were found when inspecting Unibet’s AML policies, including breaking the rules relating to business procedures, know your customer (KYC) measures, as well as rules regarding its obligation to investigate and report on players.

At the same time, Norwegian regulator Lottstift warned Trannel International Ltd, a wholly owned subsidiary of Kindred Group, that it would sanction the operator with financial penalties of NOK 1.2 million (€120,000) daily if it did not stop its illegal gambling activity in Norway. Trannel had received similar warnings back in April 2019 and Kindred have already made a number of legal appeals in Norway in response which have all been rejected by Norway's supreme court. Despite the threats of heavy fines Kindred refused to stop operations in Norway.

In August 2022, the Canadian Alcohol and Gaming Commission levied a CAD$48k penalty on Unibet for alleged infractions of the Registrar’s Standards for Internet Gaming (the Standards), pertaining to advertising and inducements.
