= ECOGRA =

Testing and standard organisation

eCOGRA
- eCommerce Online Gaming Regulation and Assurance
- Formation: 2003; 23 years ago
- Founded at: London, England
- Purpose: Standards and testing
- Website: Official website

eCOGRA (eCommerce Online Gaming Regulation and Assurance) is a London-based testing agency and standards organisation in the realm of online gambling. The company was established in 2003 in the United Kingdom at the behest of the online gaming industry as the first industry self-regulation system. eCOGRA is a testing laboratory, inspection body, and certification body, specializing in the certification of online gaming software and the audit of Information Security Management Systems.

The organisation has been awarded the United Kingdom Accreditation Service (UKAS) ISO approvals ISO/IEC17025:2017 : General Requirements for the competence of testing and calibration laboratories for Bulgaria, Denmark, Great Britain, Greece, Netherlands, Switzerland and Sweden, ISO/IEC 17020:2012 : Requirements for the operation of various types of bodies performing inspection for Greece, Netherlands, Sweden and Switzerland, ISO/IEC17065:2012 : Conformity assessment — Requirements for bodies certifying products, processes and services to provide product conformity certification, for Greece, Netherlands and Sweden and ISO/IEC 17021-1:2015 – Requirements for bodies providing audit and certification of management systems.

In the year to 30 September 2024, 7% of customer complaints were upheld.

== Regulated Market Certification Activities ==
Since the widespread regulation of online gambling in various jurisdictions, the company's focus has moved from pure self-regulation enabling player protection to the provision of regulatory compliance services in regulated markets. It is approved as a testing agency, inspection body and designated certification entity in various online gambling jurisdictions including Alderney, Buenos Aires Province, Buenos Aires City, Bulgaria, Colombia, Croatia, Czech Republic, Denmark, Estonia, First Cagayan, Gibraltar, Great Britain, Greece, Isle of Man, Italy, Jersey, Kahnawake, Latvia, Lithuania, Malta, Netherlands, New Jersey (Security), Ontario (Canada), Philippines, Portugal, Romania, Spain, Sweden and Switzerland.

== ISO/IEC 27001 Certification Services ==
eCOGRA was the first testing laboratory that specialises in online gambling to have been awarded ISO/IEC 17021-1:2015 accreditation, which is a prerequisite for carrying out third-party ISO/IEC 27001:2013 audits and accredited certifications of Information Security Management Systems.

eCOGRA provides ISO/IEC 27001:2013 pre-certification assessments and accredited certifications, utilising the framework required in the ISO/IEC 17021-1:2015 and ISO/IEC 27006:2015 standards.

eCOGRA has instituted an independent Impartiality Committee. The purpose of the Committee is to help safeguard the integrity of ISO/IEC 17021-related audits and certification of management systems, by enabling a consultation between appropriate interested parties to advise on matters affecting impartiality within eCOGRA including openness and public perception.

== eGAP (eCOGRA Generally Accepted Practices) ==
The eGAP regime has particular emphasis on fair and responsible gambling, and these eGAP requirements are enforced through onsite reviews and continuous monitoring. One of the criteria used to determine trustworthy, reliable and safe online casinos is the approval of the organization.

eCOGRA’s Safe and Fair Seal is awarded to online gaming operators that comply with eCOGRA’s Generally Accepted Practice (eGAP) Requirements covering player protection, fair gaming and responsible operator behaviour. Applicants are assessed annually through onsite compliance reviews by eCOGRA compliance specialists.

The eCOGRA Certified Software Seal is awarded to software suppliers which are able to demonstrate compliance with the applicable eGAP Requirements. Software developers or platform providers are assessed annually against software supplier requirements which pay particular focus on the internal controls governing the development processes and controls as well as the IT internal control and security environment.

The company’s self-regulatory compliance activities are focused on the following policy objectives:

1. The protection of vulnerable customers
2. The prevention of underage gambling
3. Combating fraudulent and criminal behaviour
4. Protection of customer privacy and safeguarding of information
5. Prompt and accurate customer payments
6. Fair gaming (e.g. RNG and game evaluations)
7. Responsible marketing
8. Commitment to customer satisfaction and support
9. Secure, safe and reliable operating environment
