= Scandic Hotels =

Swedish hotel chain

Scandic Hotels Group AB
- Type: Publicly traded aktiebolag
- Traded as: Nasdaq Stockholm: SHOT
- Industry: Hospitality
- Founded: 1963 (as Esso Motor Hotel)
- Headquarters: Stockholm, Sweden
- Area served: Nordic countries Germany; Poland
- Key people: Jens Mathiesen, President and CEO; Per G. Braathen, Chairman of the Board of Directors
- Products: Hotels
- Revenue: ▲SEK 18,007 million (2018)
- Operating income: ▲SEK 1,957 million (2018)
- Net income: ▼SEK 678 million (2018)
- Number of employees: 10,003 full-time equivalent (2024)
- Website: www.scandichotels.com

Scandic Hotels is a Swedish hotel chain headquartered in Stockholm, Sweden, with its main operations in the Nordic countries. Alongside hotels in Sweden, Norway, Finland and Denmark, the company also has a presence in Germany and Poland. As of 31 December 2018, the company had 11,560 employees and operated 283 hotels with 51,693 guest rooms.

== History ==
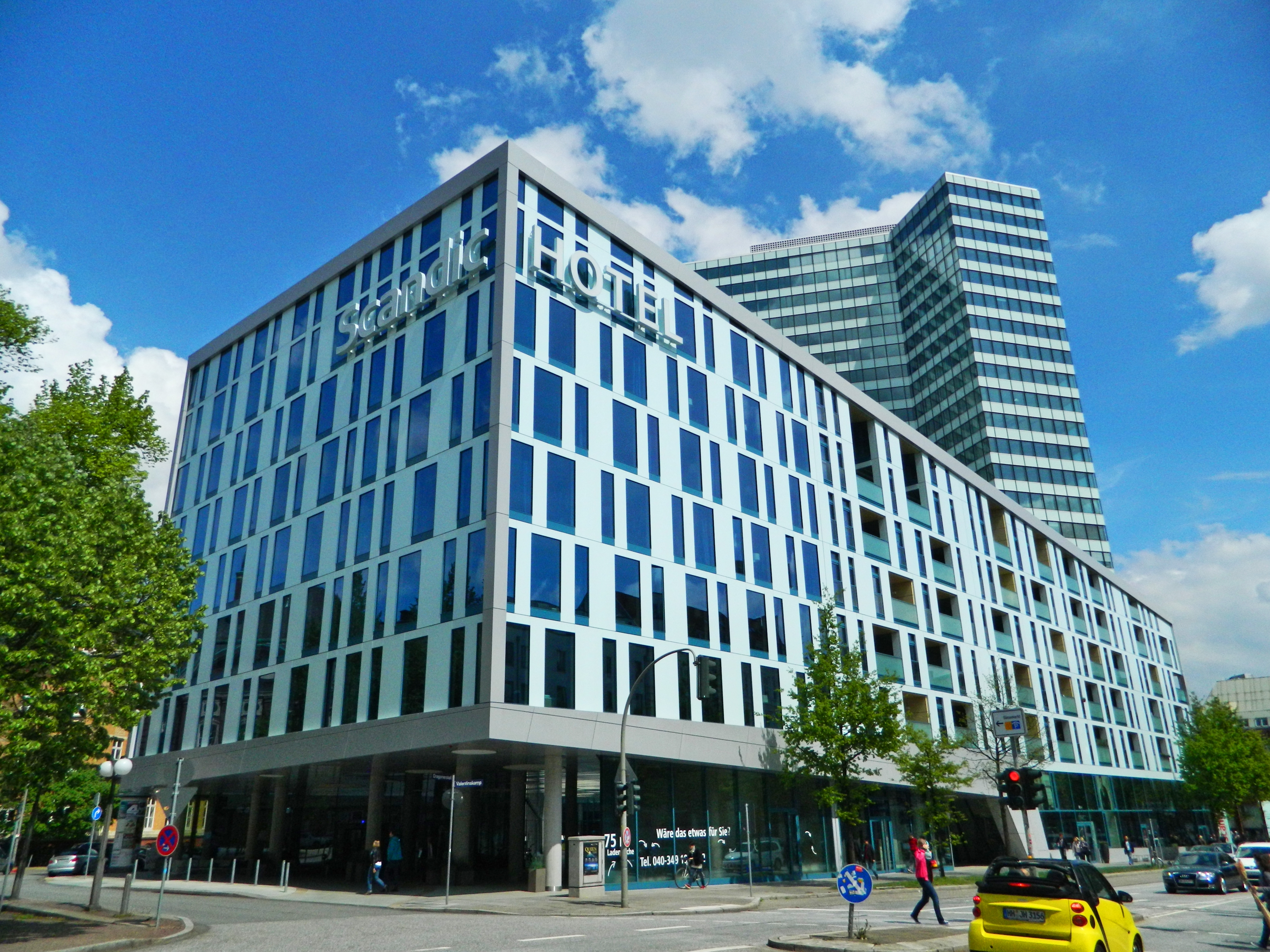
Scandic Hotel in Hamburg

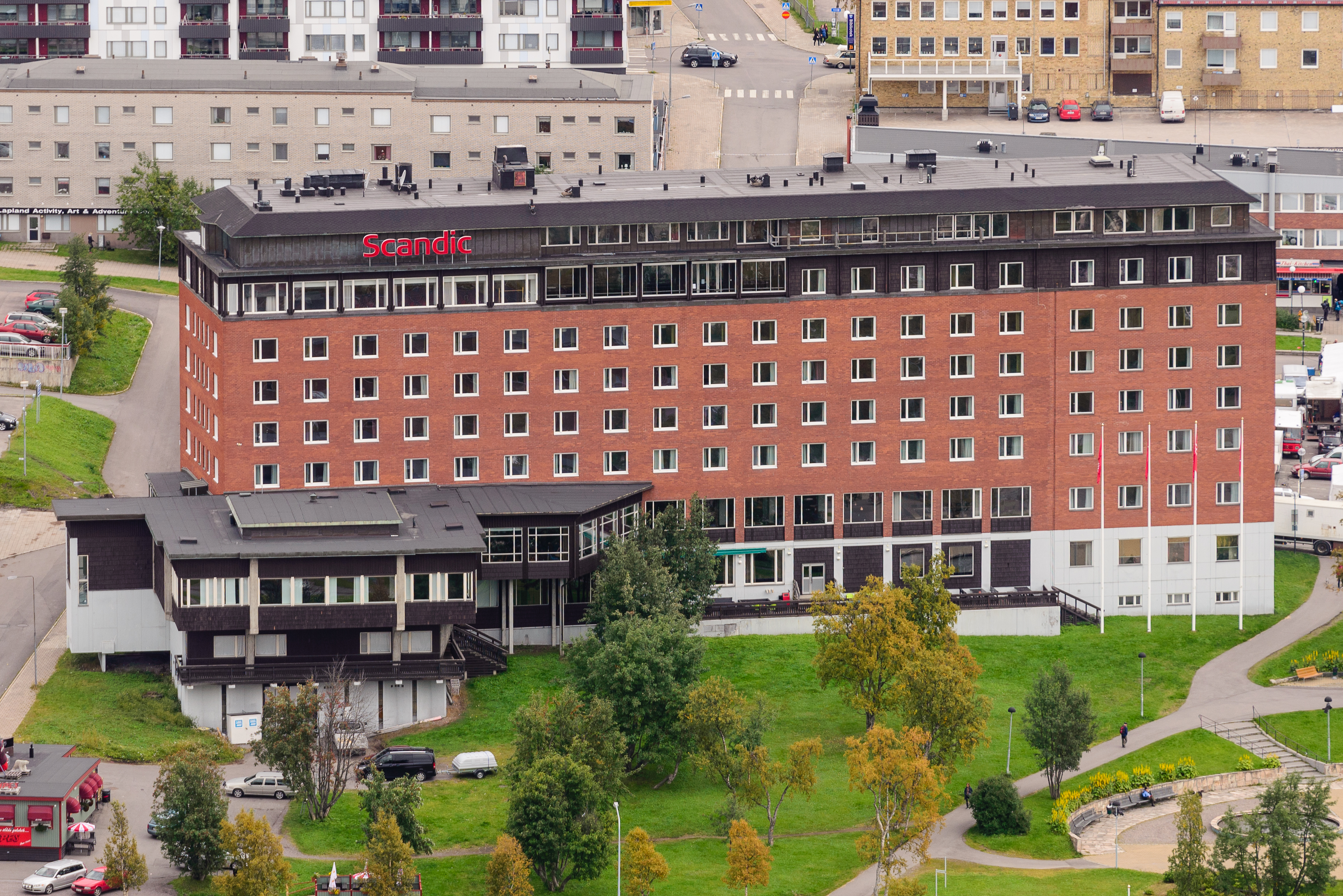
Scandic Hotel in Kiruna

=== Foundation and early years ===
The first hotel in what was later to become the Scandic chain was the Esso Motor Hotel in Laxå in the province of Närke, central Sweden. Opened in 1963, it capitalized on the increase in car travel, both for business and pleasure – the motel was a novel concept for Europe at the time. The chain grew to 59 hotels Europewide by 1972, when Esso sold the non-Scandinavian hotels. The remaining 32 hotels, five of them in Norway and Denmark, formed the largest hotel chain in its native Sweden in 1973.

In 1983, Esso sold the Esso Motor Hotel company to a Swedish consortium headed by Ratos, a private equity firm. The following year, it was renamed Scandic Hotels. Ratos became sole owner in 1985, and a year later, the first Scandic hotel outside Scandinavia opened in Koblenz, Germany.

The business was negatively impacted by the 1990/91 Gulf Crisis, and company management was replaced in 1992. In 1996, the group acquired Reso Hotels and became a publicly traded company on the Stockholm Stock Exchange. Two years later, the Arctia Hotels group in Finland followed, giving Scandic a presence in all the Nordic countries, and in 1999, the group expanded into Estonia.

=== Developments since 2000 ===
In 2001, Scandic was acquired by the London-based Hilton Group. The hotel chain changed ownership again in 2007, this time bought by Swedish private equity firm EQT for EUR 833 million. In 2014, Scandic acquired the Rica Hotels chain, which added 72 properties in Norway and Sweden to its portfolio.

In December 2015, Scandic once again was listed on the Stockholm Stock Exchange.

In 2014 Scandic Hotels launched its HTL hotel brand. In June 2016 the company dropped the brand. The brand was applied to four hotels in the group in Stockholm and Oslo, which were turned back into Scandic Hotels after the HTL brand was abandoned. In 2017, Scandic announced its buy-out of all 43 Restel hotels in Finland for 114.5 million euros, including those under the Cumulus and Holiday Inn brands.

In March 2020, more than half of Scandic's permanent employees were notified of layoffs as a result of the Coronavirus pandemic. In April the same year, Scandic Hotels had a room occupancy of six percent, which was the lowest occupancy the hotel chain had ever had. The low occupancy and reduced revenue during the year led to Scandic reporting a loss of just over six billion SEK for 2020.

== Corporate affairs ==
=== Business figures ===
As of 31 December 2018, the company employed 11,560 people and operated 283 hotels with 51,693 guest rooms. Operating result (EBITDA) for 2018 amounted to SEK 1,957 million.

=== Sustainability ===
In recent years, Scandic has made efforts to advance sustainability, focusing on reducing carbon emissions, minimizing waste, and implementing environmentally friendly practices across its hotels. Scandic Hotels partnered with Too Good To Go and Karma to reduce food waste within its hotels in 2019.
