= Hotel Normandie =

Hotel Normandie may refer to:

- Hotel Normandie (Los Angeles)
- Hotel Normandie (New York City)
- Hotel Normandie (San Francisco)

== See also ==
- Normandy Hotel in Scotland
- Normandie Hotel in Puerto Rico
