= Laxå Municipality =

Laxå Municipality Laxå kommun
- Municipality
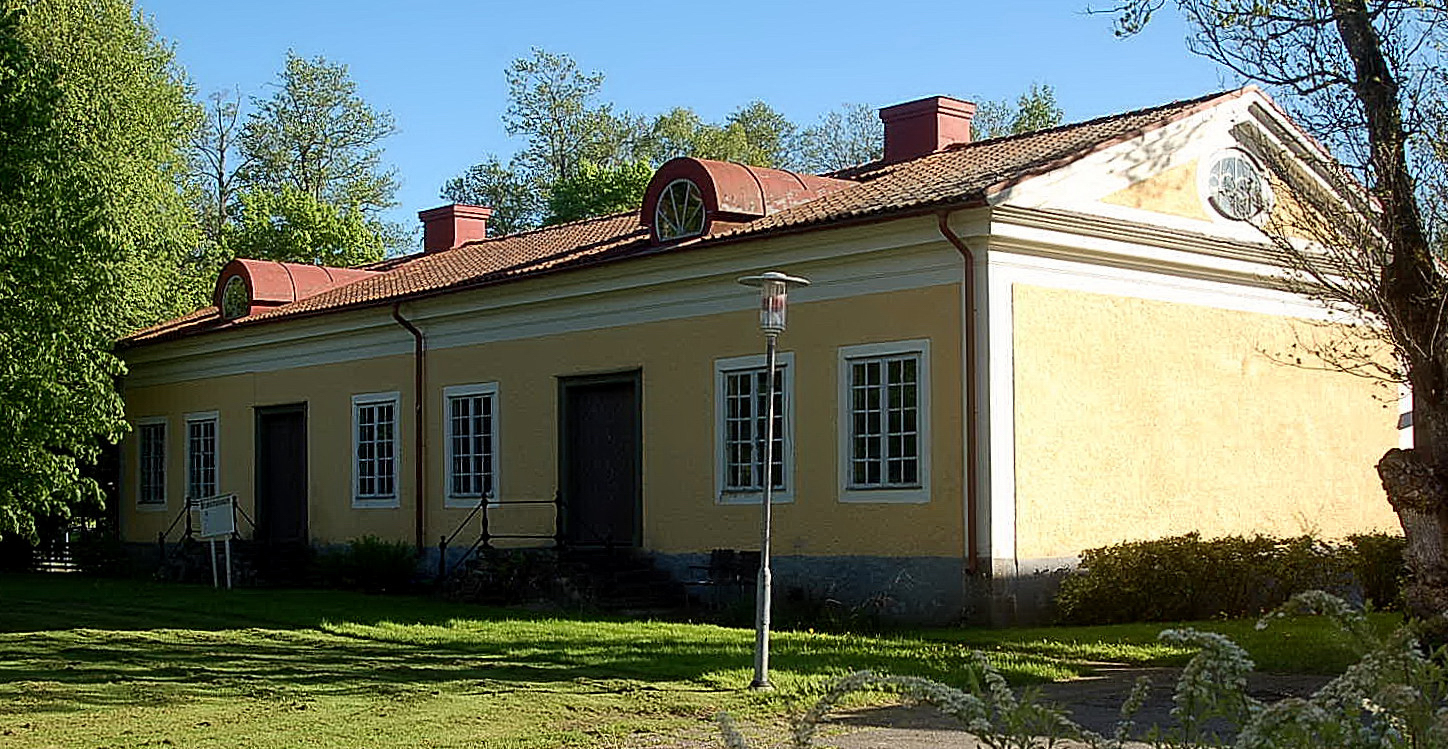
- Laxå Museum

- Coat of arms

- Coordinates: 58°59′N 14°37′E
- Country: Sweden
- County: Örebro County
- Seat: Laxå

Area
  - Total: 737.56 km^{2} (284.77 sq mi)
  - Land: 601.97 km^{2} (232.42 sq mi)
  - Water: 135.59 km^{2} (52.35 sq mi)
- Area as of 1 January 2014.

Population (30 June 2025)
  - Total: 5,404
  - Density: 8.977/km^{2} (23.25/sq mi)
- Time zone: UTC+1 (CET)
  - Summer (DST): UTC+2 (CEST)
- ISO 3166 code: SE
- Province: Närke and Västergötland
- Municipal code: 1860
- Website: www.laxa.se

Laxå Municipality (Swedish: Laxå kommun) is a municipality in Örebro County in central Sweden. Its seat is located in the town of Laxå.

In 1967 the market town (köping) of Laxå (instituted in 1946) was merged with two adjacent rural municipalities. One of them was transferred from the former Skaraborg County, placing today's municipality in two historical provinces, Närke and Västergötland.

Its history stretches back to the 12th century, when the convent Ramundeboda was founded about 4 km west of the town.

The Tiveden National Park is partly situated within the municipality.

== Localities ==
- Finnerödja
- Laxå (seat)
- Röfors

== Demographics ==
This is a demographic table based on Laxå Municipality's electoral districts in the 2022 Swedish general election sourced from SVT's election platform, in turn taken from SCB official statistics.

In total there were 5,575 residents, including 4,312 Swedish citizens of voting age. 46.5% voted for the left coalition and 52.1% for the right coalition. Indicators are in percentage points except population totals and income.

Location	Residents	Citizen adults	Left vote	Right vote	Employed	Swedish parents	Foreign heritage	Income SEK	Degree
Location			%	%					
Finneröjda	1,421	1,147	43.8	54.4	79	86	14	22,170	26
Laxå C	1,621	1,230	47.9	50.9	78	73	27	21,084	23
Laxå-Kanalområdet	1,991	1,488	44.6	54.2	77	75	25	24,164	24
Skagershult	542	447	49.9	49.6	76	87	13	25,651	25
Source: SVT

== Elections ==
These are the results of the elections in the municipality since the first election after the municipal reform, being held in 1973. The exact results of Sweden Democrats were not listed at a municipal level by SCB from 1988 to 1998 due to the party's small size at the time. "Turnout" denotes the percentage of eligible people casting any ballots, whereas "Votes" denotes the number of valid votes only.

=== Riksdag ===
Year	Turnout	Votes	V	S	MP	C	L	KD	M	SD	ND
1973	91.5	5,436	5.8	53.3	0.0	24.8	6.5	3.1	6.3	0.0	0.0
1976	92.5	5,591	4.0	51.6	0.0	25.6	8.2	3.2	6.9	0.0	0.0
1979	91.4	5,555	4.7	52.6	0.0	19.4	8.7	3.1	10.0	0.0	0.0
1982	91.4	5,536	4.9	57.2	1.1	17.1	3.8	4.2	11.7	0.0	0.0
1985	90.0	5,358	5.2	55.7	1.3	15.9	10.9	0.0	10.7	0.0	0.0
1988	85.2	4,922	6.1	56.2	4.1	11.4	9.3	4.8	8.1	0.0	0.0
1991	85.2	4,715	5.2	48.1	2.2	9.2	8.3	9.4	10.2	0.0	6.7
1994	86.2	4,565	5.8	58.0	4.1	7.8	5.8	6.0	11.2	0.0	0.5
1998	80.7	4,057	15.0	45.4	3.5	4.9	3.4	12.4	11.4	0.0	0.0
2002	80.6	3,944	9.7	50.7	2.3	7.2	8.8	10.0	6.7	2.4	0.0
2006	80.9	3,799	5.6	53.7	2.0	7.6	4.3	8.0	13.5	3.6	0.0
2010	85.6	3,847	5.2	49.1	3.0	5.7	5.2	6.3	19.5	5.8	0.0
2014	85.9	3,760	5.5	43.9	3.2	5.6	2.9	5.4	13.8	18.1	0.0

Blocs

This lists the relative strength of the socialist and centre-right blocs since 1973, but parties not elected to the Riksdag are inserted as "other", including the Sweden Democrats results from 1988 to 2006, but also the Christian Democrats pre-1991 and the Greens in 1982, 1985 and 1991. The sources are identical to the table above. The coalition or government mandate marked in bold formed the government after the election. New Democracy got elected in 1991 but are still listed as "other" due to the short lifespan of the party.

Year	Turnout	Votes	Left	Right	SD	Other	Elected
1973	91.5	5,436	**59.1**	37.4	0.0	3.5	96.5
1976	92.5	5,591	55.6	**40.9**	0.0	3.5	96.5
1979	91.4	5,555	57.3	**38.1**	0.0	4.6	95.4
1982	91.4	5,536	**62.1**	32.6	0.0	5.3	94.7
1985	90.0	5,358	**60.9**	37.5	0.0	1.6	98.4
1988	85.2	4,922	**66.4**	28.8	0.0	4.8	95.2
1991	85.2	4,715	53.3	**37.1**	0.0	9.6	97.1
1994	86.2	4,565	**67.9**	30.8	0.0	1.3	98.7
1998	80.7	4,057	**62.9**	32.1	0.0	4.0	96.0
2002	80.6	3,944	**62.7**	32.7	0.0	4.6	95.4
2006	80.9	3,799	62.3	**33.4**	0.0	4.3	95.7
2010	85.6	3,847	57.3	**36.7**	5.8	0.2	99.8
2014	85.9	3,760	**52.6**	27.7	18.1	1.6	98.4

== International relations ==
The municipality is twinned with:

- Grevesmühlen, Germany
