= Erskine Bridge Hotel & Spa =

Hotel in Erskine, Scotland

MGM Muthu Glasgow River Hotel
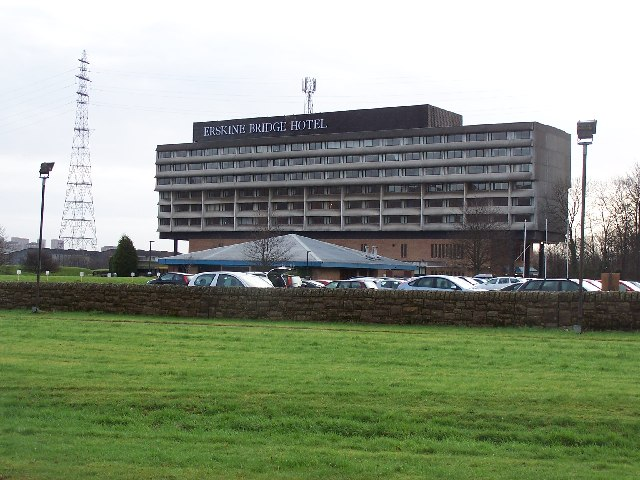
- Interactive map of the MGM Muthu Glasgow River Hotel area
- Former names: Forte Posthouse, Crest Hotel, Esso Motor Hotel, Erskine Bridge Hotel & Spa
- Hotel chain: MGM Muthu Hotels

General information
- Status: open
- Architectural style: Brutalist
- Location: Erskine, Scotland, Riverfront, Erskine, Renfrewshire PA8 6AN, Erskine, Scotland
- Coordinates: 55°54′43″N 4°27′18″W
- Completed: 1971
- Cost: £1m
- Owner: MGM Muthu Hotels
- Affiliation: Normandy Hotel

Technical details
- Floor count: 8 floors, mezzanine, 1 service floor, 6 visitor floors
- Lifts/elevators: 2
- Grounds: 18 acres

Design and construction
- Architect: Robert R Steedman
- Architecture firm: Morris and Steedman
- Other designers: Cope Notter Design Associates
- Main contractor: Daniel Construction Company (now Fluor Corporation)

Other information
- Number of rooms: 179
- Number of restaurants: 1
- Number of bars: 1 main bar and various smaller bars within conference suites
- Facilities: gym, swimming pool, conference suites, wedding facilities, function rooms, free wi-fi, restaurant, bar
- Parking: 250 spaces

Website
- https://www.muthuhotelsmgm.com/muthu-glasgow-river-hotel

The MGM Muthu Glasgow River Hotel, formerly the Erskine Bridge Hotel & Spa is situated on the banks of the River Clyde in Erskine, Renfrewshire. The hotel takes its name from the nearby Erskine Bridge and Clyde River. Originally named the Esso Motor Hotel Erskine, it opened in 1971. It was originally planned and owned by the oil company Esso. It was Scotland's second motor based hotel as Esso had already opened another unit in Edinburgh.

== Ownership ==
The hotel started out as the Esso Motor Hotel of Erskine. Since then it has changed ownership four times. Esso sold the business to the Crest Hotel Group. Then it was sold to the Forte Group of hotels and then to the Cosmopolitan Hotel Group, who renamed the hotel to the Erskine Bridge Hotel & Spa. In 2020, it was sold to its current owners, MGM Muthu Hotels, who renamed the hotel to the MGM Muthu Glasgow River Hotel.

== Construction ==
The hotel was built by Daniel Construction Company (now Fluor Corporation) at a cost of £1m. The on-site architects were Morris and Steedman. The hotel interior was designed by Cope Notter Design Associates. There is park and fly facilities for Glasgow Airport, gym, swimming pool and conference suites at the hotel. There was also a nine-hole pitch and putt golf course.
