= Normandy Hotel =

Hotel in Renfrew, Scotland

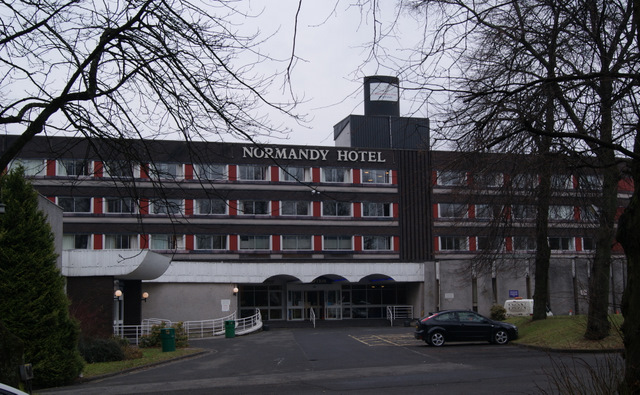
- Interactive map of the Normandy Hotel area
- Former names: Stakis Normandy Hotel
- Hotel chain: Cosmopolitan Hotels

General information
- Status: Open
- Location: Inchinnan Road, Renfrew, Scotland
- Coordinates: 55°52′50″N 4°24′26″W
- Affiliation: Erskine Bridge Hotel & Spa

Technical details
- Floor count: 4 floors, 1 mezzanine and 3 guest floors
- Lifts/elevators: 2

Other information
- Number of rooms: 141
- Number of restaurants: 1
- Number of bars: 1 main bar and various smaller bars within the conference suites
- Facilities: conference suites, wedding facilities, park & fly facilities, free wi-fi
- Parking: available

Website
- https://www.thenormandyhotel.co.uk/

The Normandy Hotel is in Renfrew, Scotland. It is on the A8 road, near Glasgow Airport. Construction of the hotel was completed in 1973.

== History ==
The hotel opened as Stakis Normandy Hotel. It was part of a portfolio of hotels, health clubs and casinos, known as Stakis Hotels. The group was one of Britain's largest hotel companies. It was owned by Reo Stakis. In February 1999 the Hilton Group bought out Stakis in a deal worth £1.16b. Prior to the sale, many of the Stakis properties were divested to other hotel chains or closed completely, Hilton only retaining the most prestigious such as the Glasgow Grosvenor and the luxury Dunkeld House in Perthshire. This led the way for the Cosmopolitan Hotel Group who also own the Erskine Bridge Hotel & Spa to buy the Normandy in February 1998 for £6m.

== Hotel ==
The hotel has 141 rooms spread out over 4 floors. There are also conference suites, a restaurant, bar, free Wi-Fi and wedding facilities available. As the hotel is sited close to Glasgow Airport it offers park and fly facilities.

== Argyll Stone and St. Convals Chariot ==
A pair of historical stones are situated within the grounds of the hotel. One stone is a pediment called Argyll Stone. It is said that the Duke of Argyll once rested at the rock in 1685. The other rock is the base of a cross called St. Convals Chariot. The cross was erected to the memory of Saint Conval. Water gathers within a small hollow on this rock. It is said that the water has healing potential. The stones are enclosed behind steel railings on a small woodland path and are approximately 1m in length, height and width.

== Gallery ==
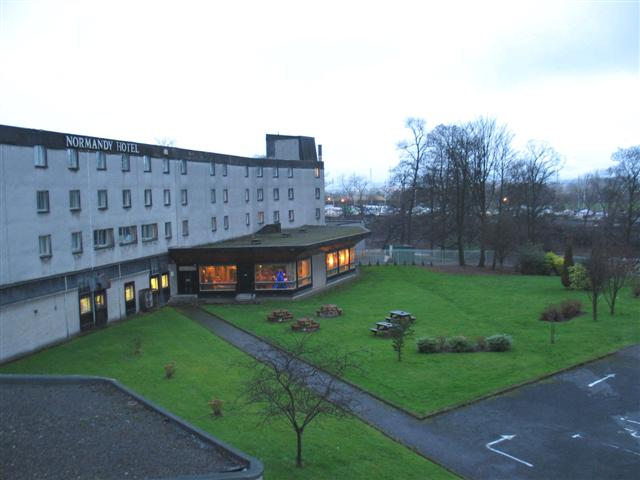
Hotel and grounds

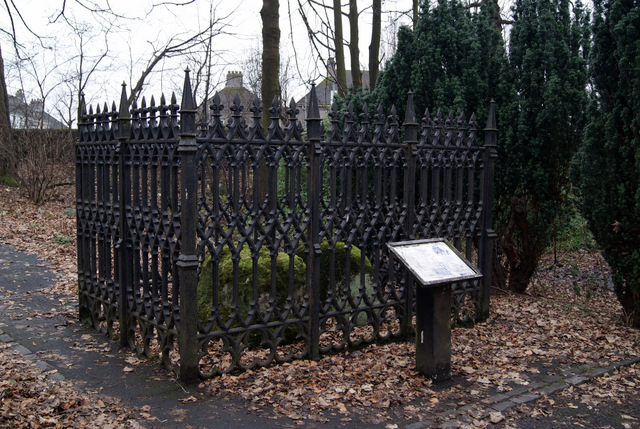
Argyle stone and St. Convals chariot
