= Esso Motor Hotel =

Company

- Native name: Motorby
- Founded: 1963 in Laxå, Sweden
- Services: Rest stops for travelers by car

Esso Motor Hotel was a Swedish subsidiary of the American oil company Esso, for running hotels in Europe.

== History ==
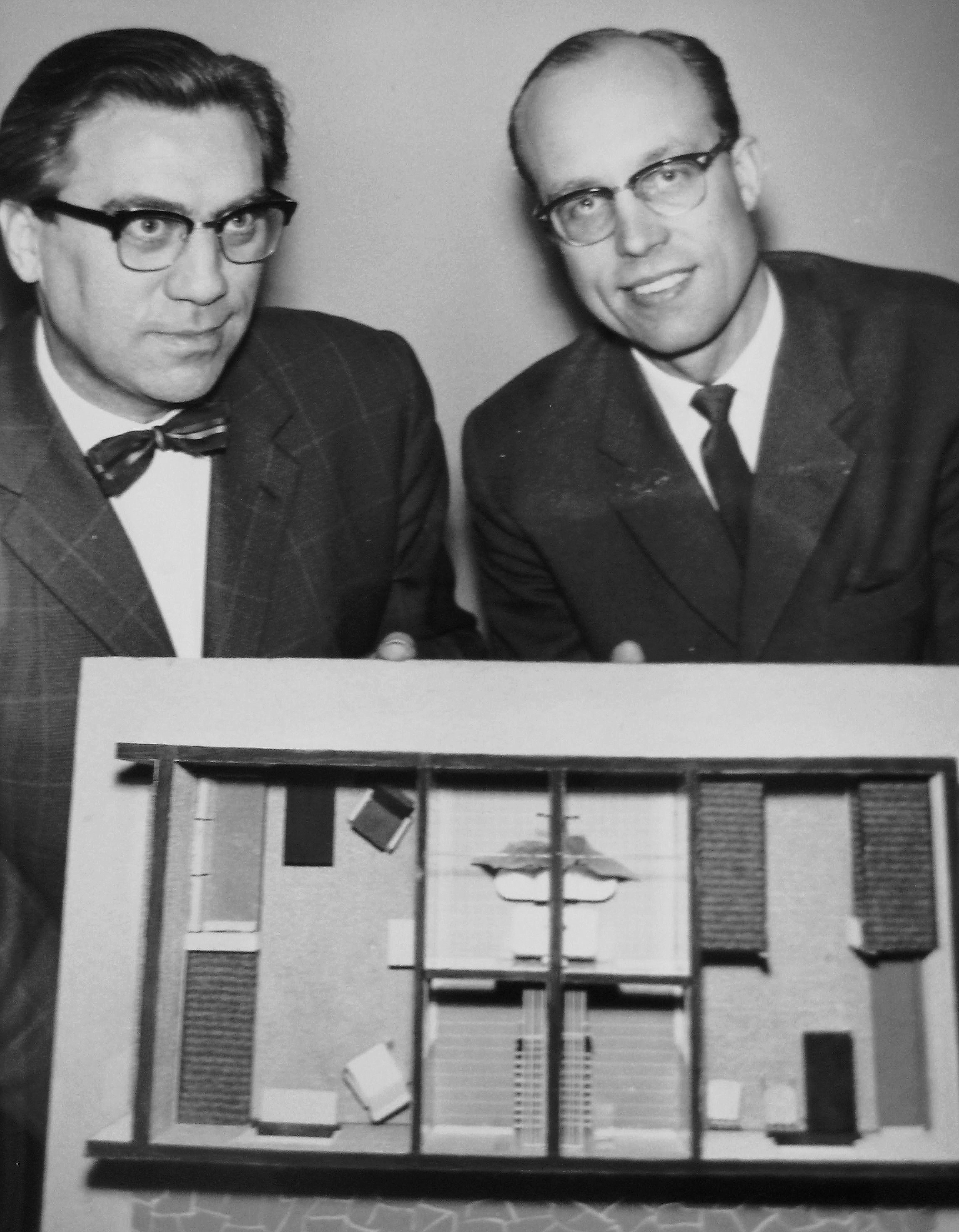
The Esso Motorby design presented by architect Lennart Billgren and Svenska Esso director Arne Gustafsson in 1961

In the 1960s, with the rise of the numbers of travelers by car, the Scandinavian governments asked for dormitories for motorists at the service stations along the highways. The first that offered bedrooms to motorists was the Swedish Esso filling station along the E3 (from 1992 renamed E20) in Laxå, halfway between Stockholm and Gothenburg, resulting in a complete Motorby in 1963 and the establishing of Esso Motor Hotel AB. A Motorby (Swedish for Motor village), is a filling station with workshop combined with a hotel specially for motorists with direct access from the parking to the rooms. All rooms and services, as a shop and cafeteria, are situated at ground floor level. The first motorby at Laxå was followed soon by motorbys at Härnösand, Östersund and Vara and a motel in Örkelljunga. The later built Esso Motor Hotels were provided with far more features than a motorby, as a waiter served restaurant, bank, fitness room, sauna, pool and meeting rooms, mainly to satisfy business travelers. The first three motorbys were upgraded to Esso Motor Hotel, but Vara and Örkelljunga were rated as Esso Motel with minimized services.

Until the splitting at the beginning of 1973, 59 Esso Motor Hotels were opened: 27 in Sweden, 3 in Norway, 2 in Denmark, 3 in the Netherlands, 3 in Italy, 8 in the United Kingdom (notably at Wembley Park, Wembley), 1 in Austria, 10 in Germany and 2 in Belgium. The chain had an internal reservation system by which the customer could book the Esso Motor Hotel for the next stage of his journey. The hotels outside Scandinavia were managed by Esso Motor Hotel inc. in London.

== The Esso Route ==
Map of the Esso Route

After the first three motor hotels in Sweden expansion abroad followed in 1965. The Scandinavian holidaymaker should be able to drive to the Italian coast using Esso Motor Hotels during the journey. The Hotels were situated in a one-day driving distance from each other. The northern end of this "Esso route" was Mölndal in Sweden which opened in 1966, the southern end was Brescia in Italy which opened in 1965. The Swedish-Danish bordercrossing was made by ferry at Helsingborg, from Denmark to Germany the route followed the, then new, Vogelfluglinie. In Germany the HaFraBa autobahn route was chosen and south of Basel the route of the present E25 through Switzerland, France and the new Mont Blanc Tunnel. In Italy Brescia was reached through Valle d'Aosta and the Autostrada Serenissima. The intermediate hotels were situated in Hannover, Courmayeur, Freiburg and Glostrup (Copenhagen). From Brescia the tourists could follow their way to the various resorts on the Adriatic in Italy as well as in Yugoslavia. More differentiation was created in 1967 by two more Hotels, Heidelberg and Sindelfingen in the south of Germany. In Sweden the hotels at Nörrköping and Jönköping were opened in 1967 too. These two enabled the travellers from and to Stockholm to follow the direct route from Stockholm to Helsingborg instead of the longer one via Laxå and Mölndal. In 1969 the southern end shifted to Florence, but Esso's Italian partner Pavesi built five hotels between Florence and Sicily. From the initial plan for the route from Trondheim in the North to Sicily in the South only the hotel in Trondheim was added afterwards.

== Expansion ==
Fourteen hotels were in use in February 1968, six of them in Sweden and an ambitious expansion plan has been launched. The word "Motel" was avoided in order to emphasize the extra features the "Motor Hotel" provides compared to a normal motel. In Sweden the number of hotels should raise to 19 by half 1968, 27 by 1969 and 35 by 1970. In 1968 the British holidaymakers were connected with the Esso route from the hotel in South Mimms via the carferries to Belgium and the new hotel in Born in the Netherlands. In Denmark the hotel in Billund was opened together with Legoland. In Casteau (Belgium) a hotel was opened next to SHAPE situated in Casteau since 1 April 1967 and in Maidenhead a new hotel was combined with the Esso trainingcentre. The number of hotels had been more than doubled by the end of 1968, although the expansion in Sweden was behind schedule. After 1968 the growth slowed down and the next doubling wasn't reached until the end of 1972. Further expansion followed mainly in Scandinavia and with more business related hotels in Germany, Belgium and the Netherlands (Antwerp and Amsterdam in 1969 and Velp in 1970). Edinburgh still expected tourists as customers but business travellers got a bigger share in Britain as well. From 1970 on new hotels were built with at least 100 rooms and smaller hotels were enlarged. At the beginning of 1972 many, also American, competitors from Esso Motor Hotel were building or completing several hotels in the European cities and Esso had several hotels nearing completion in Norway, Britain and Germany. These new beds were added to the hotel capacity already created since the mid sixties resulting in a surplus of rooms.

== New owners ==
The saturation of the hotel market in the European cities and the need for cash to finance the oil exploration did Esso decide to sell the hotels outside of Scandinavia.

=== Crest ===
The hotel in Freiburg was sold, the nine remaining German and the only Austrian Hotel were leased to Crest Hotels at the end of 1972. The other hotels outside Scandinavia, including the ninth British hotel at that time under construction at Runcorn, were sold to Crest Hotels as part of the same deal. From 1976 on the 17 hotels bought by Crest were rebranded as EuroCrest Hotel. In 1976 Crest wanted to double the number of hotels in Germany and bought the leased hotels in Germany and Austria that were rebranded as Eurocrest as well. Eventually Crest sold all its "Esso Motor Hotels" to other hotel chains.

=== Scandinavia ===
After the deal with Crest at the end of 1972, 32 hotels remained in Scandinavia, 27 of them in Sweden.

The Danish hotels were sold as well in the seventies, in 1974 Lego bought the hotel in Billund renaming it in Vis-a-Vis Hotel and later on Hotel Legoland. In 1979 the Glostrup hotel changed to Glostrup Park Hotel. Meanwhile, the expansion in Sweden and Norway continued from 28 in Sweden in 1974 to 44 in October 1976. Besides the Esso Motor Hotels the chain created parallel markets of hotels, without motorist services, in cities branded as Esso Scandic and Esso Motels, such as Örkelljunga and Vara, with minimized services. Esso also operated roadside restaurants branded as Taverna. In 1977 Esso Motor Hotels owned 10% of the hotelcapacity in Sweden but had a 25% marketshare. In 1983 Esso decided to leave the hotel business. At that time 41 Esso Motor Hotels, 8 Esso Scandic Hotels and 6 Esso Motels were operated in Sweden. The locations in Sweden and Norway were sold to a group of investors. After the detachment from the Esso-company in 1984 the Hotel-chain changed its name in Scandic Hotels.

== Esso Motor Hotels ==
Hotel	Place	Country	Opening	Location
Esso Motor Hotel Laxå	Laxå	Sweden	14.07.1963	58°58′58.6″N 14°37′31″E
Härnosand	Härnosand	Sweden	1964	62°38′36″N 17°54′30″E
Östersund	Östersund	Sweden	1965	63°9′33.4″N 14°40′18.1″E
Brescia	Brescia	Italy	1965	45°31′46.5″N 10°15′11.1″E
Mölndal	Mölndal	Sweden	1966	
South Mimms	Hendon	United Kingdom	1966	51°41′23.3″N 0°13′30.7″W
Hannover	Hannover	Germany	spring 1966	52°21′44.5″N 9°49′59.3″E
Courmayeur	Courmayeur	Italy	01.10.1966	45°48′41.5″N 6°57′38.8″E
Freiburg	Freiburg im Breisgau	Germany	autumn 1966	48°0′30.4″N 7°48′53.3″E
Glostrup	Copenhagen	Denmark	1967	55°40′0″N 12°24′34.8″E
Sindelfingen	Sindelfingen	Germany	1967	48°42′27″N 9°2′1″E
Heidelberg	Heidelberg	Germany	1967	49°23′13.6″N 8°39′41.4″E
Jönköping	Jönköping	Sweden	1967	57°47′12.2″N 14°13′45.6″E
Norrköping	Norrköping	Sweden	1967	58°37′7.2″N 16°09′40.3″E
Billund	Billund	Denmark	07.06.1968	55°43′55.2″N 9°7′36.2″E
Arlöv	Arlöv	Sweden	1968	
Born	Born	Netherlands	1968	51°2′18.8″N 5°49′53.2″E
Borås	Borås	Sweden	1968	57°43′9.6″N 12°58′13.7″E
Casteau	Casteau	Belgium	1968	50°30′32.4″N 4°0′10.8″E
Eskilstuna	Eskilstuna	Sweden	1968	59°22′11.9″N 16°33′10.4″E
Falun	Falun	Sweden	1968	
Gävle	Gävle	Sweden	1968	
Kalmar	Kalmar	Sweden	1968	56°40′24″N 16°19′11″E
Kungens Kurva	Stockholm	Sweden	1968	59°16′19.5″N 17°54′57.6″E
Linz	Linz	Austria		48°16′47.3″N 14°18′22.1″E
Maidenhead	Maidenhead	United Kingdom	1968	51°30′31.3″N 0°43′57.7″W
Malmö	Malmö	Sweden	1968	
Nürnberg	Nürnberg	Germany	1968	49°25′26″N 11°06′25.3″E
Söderhamn	Söderhamn	Sweden	1968	61°18′8.3″N 17°1′58.8″E
Södertälje	Södertälje	Sweden	1968	59°10′30″N 17°38′37.2″E
Amsterdam	Amsterdam	Netherlands	26.02.1969	52°20′7″N 4°53′17.9″E
Antwerpen	Antwerp	Belgium	1969	51°11′25″N 4°24′15.2″E
Firenze	Florence	Italy	1969	43°45′27.1″N 11°17′54.6″E
Hamburg	Hamburg	Germany	02.09.1969	53°36′4.3″N 10°1′25.1″E
Helsingborg	Helsingborg	Sweden	>1968	
Luleå	Luleå	Sweden	> 1968	
Lund	Lund	Sweden	> 1968	
Örebro	Örebro	Sweden	> 1968	59°16′28.6″N 15°10′37.9″E
Ulriksdal-Järva Krog	Stockholm	Sweden	>1968	59°22′44.9″N 18°0′36″E
Uppsala	Uppsala	Sweden	>1968	
Växjö	Växjö	Sweden	>1968	
Stavanger	Stavanger	Norway	13.05.1970	58°57′25.2″N 5°42′0″E
Edinburgh	Edinburgh	United Kingdom	22.05.1970	55°57′20.1″N 3°14′34.8″W
Luton	Luton	United Kingdom	>22.05.1970	
München	München	Germany	1970	48°9′36.1″N 11°37′10.8″E
Umeå	Umeå	Sweden		63°49′0″N 20°15′5.4″E
Karlstad	Karlstad	Sweden		59°23′30.2″N 13°29′47.5″E
Velp	Velp	Netherlands	1970	51°59′5″N 5°58′40.2″E
Köln	Cologne	Germany	1971	50°55′37.9″N 6°54′13.7″E
Høvik	Høvik	Norway	1972	59°53′52.2″N 10°33′57.6″E
Trondheim	Trondheim	Norway	10.06.1972	63°24′36″N 10°26′31.2″E
Hambrook	Bristol	United Kingdom	06.1972	51°30′18″N 2°32′13.2″W
Coventry	Coventry	United Kingdom	1972	
Wembley	London	United Kingdom	1972	51°33′20.7″N 0°17′7.6″W
Frankfurt	Frankfurt am Main	Germany	08.1972	50°4′28.6″N 8°39′42.2″E
Bremen	Bremen	Germany	09.1972	53°5′11.3″N 8°52′26.9″E
Erskine Bridge	Erskine	United Kingdom	21.11.1972	55°54′43.2″N 4°27′18″W
Beechwood	Runcorn	United Kingdom	20.02.1973	53°18′41″N 2°41′42″W
Vänersborg	Vänersborg	Sweden	1978	58°21′48.5″N 12°19′3.8″E
Flesland	Bergen	Norway	09.09.1980	
Askersund	Askersund	Sweden		58°52′45.6″N 14°53′52.8″E
Årjäng	Årjäng	Sweden		
Backadal	Gothenburg	Sweden		
Borlänge	Borlänge	Sweden		60°29′3.6″N 15°26′5.9″E
Fagersta	Fagersta	Sweden		
Filipstad	Filipstad	Sweden		59°42′45.6″N 14°10′29.5″E
Flen	Flen	Sweden		
Gränna	Gränna	Sweden		
Karlshamn	Karlshamn	Sweden		56°11′24.8″N 14°50′49.2″E
Karlskoga	Karlskoga	Sweden		
Linköping	Linköping	Sweden		58°24′20.6″N 15°33′39.6″E
Mora	Mora	Sweden		
Nyköping	Nyköping	Sweden		
Örnsköldsvik	Örnsköldsvik	Sweden		
Sundsvall	Sundsvall	Sweden		62°24′49.1″N 17°20′43.8″E
Ulricehamn	Ulricehamn	Sweden		
Västerås	Västerås	Sweden		

== See also ==
- List of hotels
- List of motels
