= Reo Stakis =

20th-century Cypriot hotel magnate

Sir Reo Stakis
- Born: Argyros Anastasis; 13 March 1913; Kato Drys, Cyprus
- Died: 28 August 2001 (aged 88)
- Occupations: Hotelier, restaurateur
- Known for: Founder of Stakis Hotels

Sir Reo Stakis (born Argyros Anastasis; 13 March 1913 – 28 August 2001) was a Cypriot hotel magnate, longtime head of Stakis Hotels.

== Biography ==
Dunblane Hydro Hotel, bought by Stakis in 1962 (photo 2010)

He was born in Kato Drys, Cyprus, 13 March 1913 and left for Britain in 1928, aged 14, travelling first to England and then to Scotland, where he settled in Glasgow. He started selling his mother's handmade lace door-to-door and gradually headed north, settling in Glasgow. By the 1940s, Stakis was involved in his first restaurant, the Victory in Glasgow, whose affordable prices began to change the way Scottish people dined out. By the 1960s, he had a chain of thirty restaurants and hotels throughout Scotland. In 1962, he bought the Dunblane Hydro Hotel, which was run-down yet within six months he had returned it to profit. Stakis was to make his home in the grounds of that hotel.

Stakis opened Scotland's first casino, the Chevalier, in 1964 and gradually added several other casinos to the Stakis group. However, his flagship hotel, The Grosvenor, was destroyed by fire in 1978.

He was knighted in 1988. By that time Stakis' son Andros had taken over the business and in difficult trading conditions, some poor decisions brought the company close to bankruptcy. However, new management brought renewed profitability and Stakis was able to sell his empire to the Hilton Group for about £1.2 billion in 1999, a recovery from the £70 million at which the company had been valued during the 1991 crisis; some shareholders complained of another Scottish company being sold to an English buyer.

He was Chairman of Stakis plc from 1947–1991, and President 1986-1999.

He married Annitsa Petropoulos in 1946, and they had two sons and four daughters.

Stakis was a generous benefactor to the Greek Orthodox church in Glasgow, buying both their first church in the city in 1953 and their Cathedral of St Luke the Evangelist in 1960.

Stakis died in Stirling on 28 August 2001. He is buried in Dunblane Cemetery.

Scottish journalist Jack Webster wrote his biography Stakis: The Reo Stakis Story.
