= Cyril Stein =

English bookmaker, businessman and philanthropist

- סיריל שטיין
- Born: 20 February 1928; London, England
- Died: 15 February 2011 (aged 82); Jerusalem, Israel
- Education: West Ham Grammar School
- Occupation: Businessman
- Title: Chairman, Ladbrokes (1966-1993)
- Spouse: Betty Young
- Children: 3

Cyril Stein (Hebrew: סיריל שטיין; 20 February 1928 - 15 February 2011) was an English bookmaker, businessman and finally philanthropic supporter of many Jewish causes and charities who first bought Ladbrokes in 1956, then floated it in 1967 and finally left it in 1993.

== Biography ==
Born in the East End of London into a family of immigrants from Russia. His father, known as “Honest Jack”, worked for the London and Provincial Sporting News Agency, which relayed information between off-course bookmakers and racecourses. Cyril Stein was educated at West Ham Grammar School. Stein did his best to shun publicity and said one of his main concerns was to keep his family out of the limelight. He married Betty Young in 1949. He was survived by his wife sons Jonathan and Daniel and daughter Marion, and several grandchildren.

An Orthodox Jew, he was never seen at a racetrack on a Saturday, the Jewish Sabbath, and was frequently seen in public wearing a knitted kippah. He used his money and influence to try to keep the West Bank, including East Jerusalem, in Israeli hands. In the 1980's he won a $250 million tender, via Ladbrokes, to redevelop the Mamilla neighbourhood in Jerusalem.

As a committed Zionist throughout his life, Stein spent much of his latter years in Israel. Stein was a major funder of the Labour Friends of Israel along with Trevor Chinn.

== Business career ==
Stein ran his own small credit-betting office in the West End of London when (aged 28) he teamed up in 1956 with his bookmaker uncle Mark, who traded as Max Parker, to buy the venerable but failing bookmaking firm of Ladbrokes, founded in 1886, for a reported £100,000.

Appointed chairman of Ladbrokes in 1966 and some 12 months before the company was successfully floated on the London Stock Exchange with an initial market capitalization of £1-million. Cyril Stein remained chairman until stepping down at the end of 1993 (aged 65) by which time the company was valued in excess of £2-billion. At the start of 1994 John Jackson became non-executive chairman and Peter George group chief executive, together taking over the leadership of the company from Stein.

== Philanthropy ==
He was:

- Vice-president of United Joint Israel Appeal (UJIA)
- Supporter of the Jewish National Fund (JNF), including
  - Chair of the JNF Negev redevelopment project
- Trustee of the Jewish Education Development Trust
- Trustee and chairman of the Governors of Carmel College, Wallingford, Oxfordshire (UK)
