= Finnerödja =

- Location within Örebro Location within Sweden
- Coordinates: 58°56′N 14°26′E
- Country: Sweden
- Province: Västergötland
- County: Örebro County
- Municipality: Laxå Municipality

Area
  - Total: 1.01 km^{2} (0.39 sq mi)

Population (31 December 2010)
  - Total: 604
  - Density: 596/km^{2} (1,540/sq mi)
- Time zone: UTC+1 (CET)
  - Summer (DST): UTC+2 (CEST)

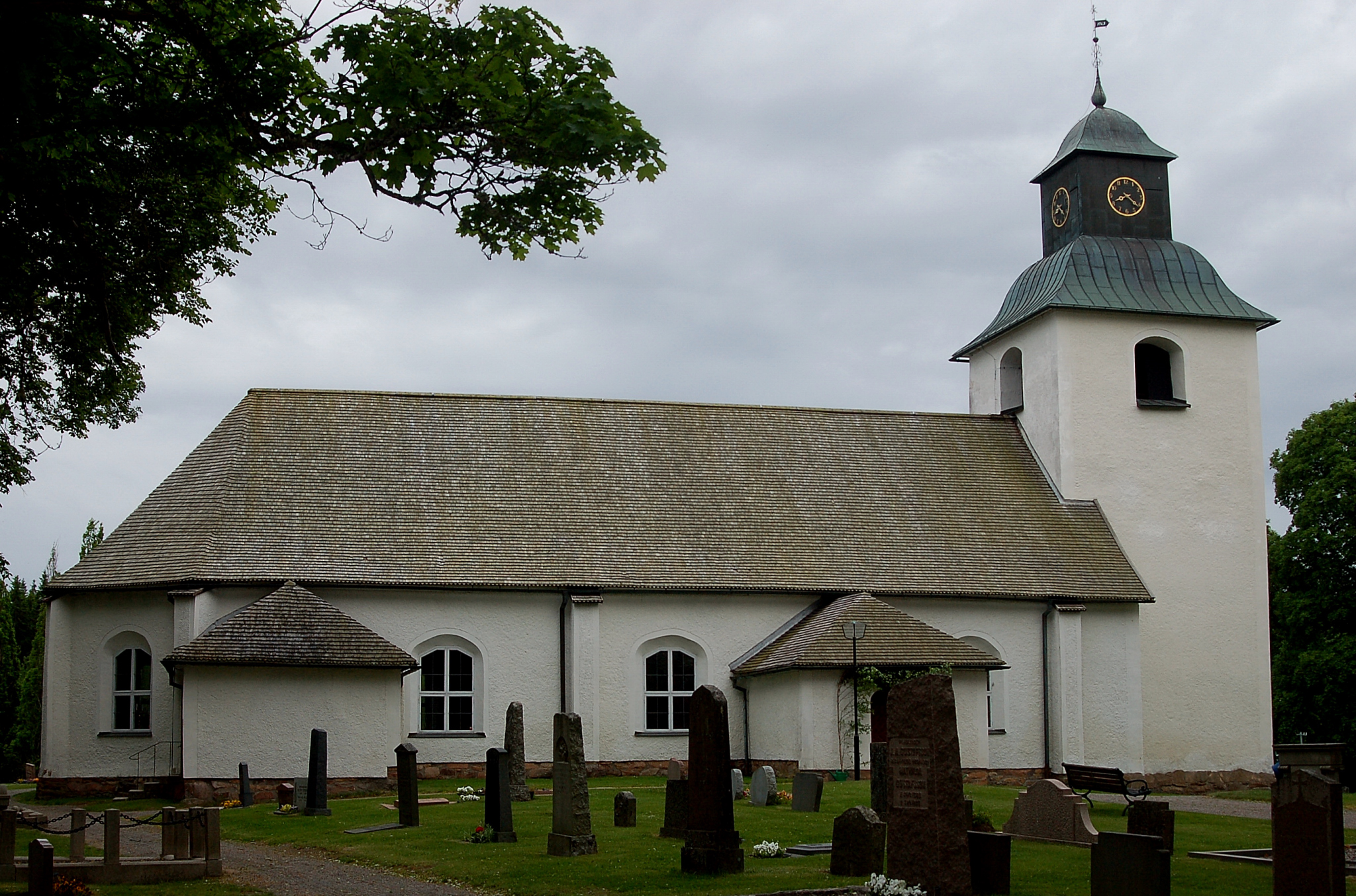
Finnerödja Church

Finnerödja (Swedish pronunciation: [ˈfɪ̂nːɛˌrœjːa]) is a locality situated in Laxå Municipality, Örebro County, Sweden with 604 inhabitants in 2010.
