= Helen Vernet =

Helen Monica Mabel Vernet (1875–1956) was the first woman in the history of horse racing in Great Britain to be granted a license to legally carry out business as a bookmaker on a racecourse.

== Early life ==
Helen Vernet is thought to have been born on 12 June 1875. She was the daughter of Arthur Bryden (d. 1897), a solicitor, of Broxmore House, Whiteparish, Wiltshire, and his wife Rosa Matilda, daughter of Sir Arthur Percy Cuninghame-Fairlie, 10th Baronet. In 1891 the family were living in Beauchamp Place.

Reportedly, Vernet inherited £8,000 following the death of her father in 1897. When she was 21, she married Armyn Littledale Thornton, a stockbroker by profession on 2 November 1896. When she came of age, and having this capital of her own, she quickly developed a taste for gambling and a fondness for going to the racetrack as often as she could. Vernet was not yet a skilled enough operator of the kind she was later to become, gradually dissipating most of her inheritance in the process of her activities. Apparently, this was not a happy union from the outset, as the marriage ended in annulment in January 1905. As the marriage was annulled, in accordance with Matrimonial Causes Act 1857, both parties were free to marry again. Later in 1905 Vernet married another stockbroker, Robert Vernet. She started divorce proceedings against him in November 1923, but they had lived separately for well over a decade.

== Bookmaking ==
At this time, Tote pool betting was not yet a feature of British racecourses, and the rough and tumble of the betting ring was very much a male preserve and socially out of bounds to the opposite sex. Helen Vernet had noticed that many women wanted to bet. The problem was that for those women in the Tattersalls enclosure and grandstand areas wanting to place a small wager, the only available bookmakers were to be found along the rails. And, because entry to such enclosures on a racecourse was more expensive than entry to the general public enclosures, bookmakers along the Tattersalls rails were less inclined to accept small bets, often refusing to accept stakes of less than a pound.

Vernet began collecting small bets from women friends and acquaintances sometime between 1911 and 1912, in the members' enclosure at race meetings throughout the home counties. Unfortunately, as word got around and demand for her services visibly increased, her illegal and unlicensed activities soon came to the attention of the authorities. She was duly "warned off", the procedure whereby a person of proven dubious character is banned from attending official racecourse meetings in Britain for a set period of time.

Because word of her activities had got around, she was recruited by bookmaker Arthur Bendir, who had been running the Ladbrokes bookmaking firm since 1902. Under his direction, in 1913, Ladbrokes had established an office in the heart of London's Mayfair; the intention was to provide horse race betting for an elite clientele drawn from the ranks of the British aristocracy and upper classes who frequented the nearby exclusive gentlemen's clubs, including White's, Boodle's, the Carlton, the Athenaeum and the Royal Automobile Club. It was thought that because of Vernet's family social connections, she would be well placed to discreetly attract upper-crust female racegoers and then, by association, their equally well-heeled partners.

During the First World War racing became less busy and in November 1914 Vernet became involved in the newly formed Volunteer Motor Mobilization Corporation (VMMC), organising motorcades to take wounded soldiers to convalescent hospitals or to the countryside. She was the VMMC’s honorary secretary, working out of the Ladbrokes offices on Old Burlington Street. The VMMC sourced cars that could be borrowed for outings for the injured soldiers. In the first six months of operation, the VMMC helped over 26,000 men, and was supported by patrons including the King, Edward VII.

In 1919, racing took off once again and Vernet returned to bookmaking. Prior to the Gaming and Betting Act 1961 that allowed off-course betting shops, all betting on an up-front cash basis was restricted to the racecourses. However, betting on the basis of a previously agreed credit settlement between the bookmaker and the client was not, an arrangement that was appropriate to the planned clientele. In his 1985 autobiography The Life and Secrets of a Professional Punter, Alex Bird, renowned British professional horse race punter of the post-war 1940s and 50s, profiled both Ladbrokes and Mrs Verney (as he called her) as follows ...

In the late 1940s I did not think about opening an account with Ladbrokes. Their form was in a different league to the rest of the bookmaking world. They were not involved in the competitiveness of the ring. Their clients were mainly members of the aristocracy and without calling the odds, Ladbrokes representatives like Mrs Verney, a grey-haired dignified woman who looked about seventy if she was a day, were merely there to accept bets for very large amounts, without any fuss. Mrs Verney stood by the rails at Newmarket and no one would ever have guessed that in the hurly burly of the racetrack, she was taking bets. While other bookmakers shouted out their odds she hardly ever spoke.

Under the guidance and tutelage of her mentor, Arthur Bendir, Vernet was made a partner in the firm in 1928 and was paid a reputed £20,000 per year in salary and commission as Ladbrokes' on-course rails representative. In 1939 she was living in Hove, Sussex. While never one to hoard money, she enjoyed an elegant and comfortable lifestyle that afforded Vernet the opportunity to eventually settle at 49 Eaton Place in London's Belgravia, and holiday regularly on the French Riviera where she liked to gamble at the casino tables. But nevertheless, she insisted on working almost until her death in 1956 at the age of 80, even to the extent of attending race meetings in a wheelchair pushed by her assistant, Alf Simmons, due to the crippling effects of arthritis.

== Death ==
Helen Vernet died on 30 March 1956 and while she did not die penniless, she did not die wealthy either. Given her taste for expensive living, and a love of taking chances, when she obtained money, she spent it, living life to her available means, if not occasionally above it.

While there are apparently no photographs of Helen Vernet in the public domain there is however a Punch cartoon of her, drawn by George Belcher, that dates from the mid-1930s. It depicts her and an accompanying male clerk ready to do business on some unnamed racecourse – the caption reads: "To see her standing on the rails – One woman in a world of males – Serene, as you hand your choice both ways – Far older than the odds she lays."
