= Röfors =

- Location within Örebro Location within Sweden
- Coordinates: 58°57′N 14°37′E
- Country: Sweden
- Province: Närke
- County: Örebro County
- Municipality: Laxå Municipality

Area
  - Total: 1.10 km^{2} (0.42 sq mi)

Population (31 December 2010)
  - Total: 207
  - Density: 188/km^{2} (490/sq mi)
- Time zone: UTC+1 (CET)
  - Summer (DST): UTC+2 (CEST)

Röfors (Swedish pronunciation: [ˈrø̂ːfɔʂ]) is a locality situated in Laxå Municipality, Örebro County, Sweden with 207 inhabitants in 2010.
