= Tiveden National Park =

National park of Sweden

- Tivedens nationalpark
- IUCN category II (national park)
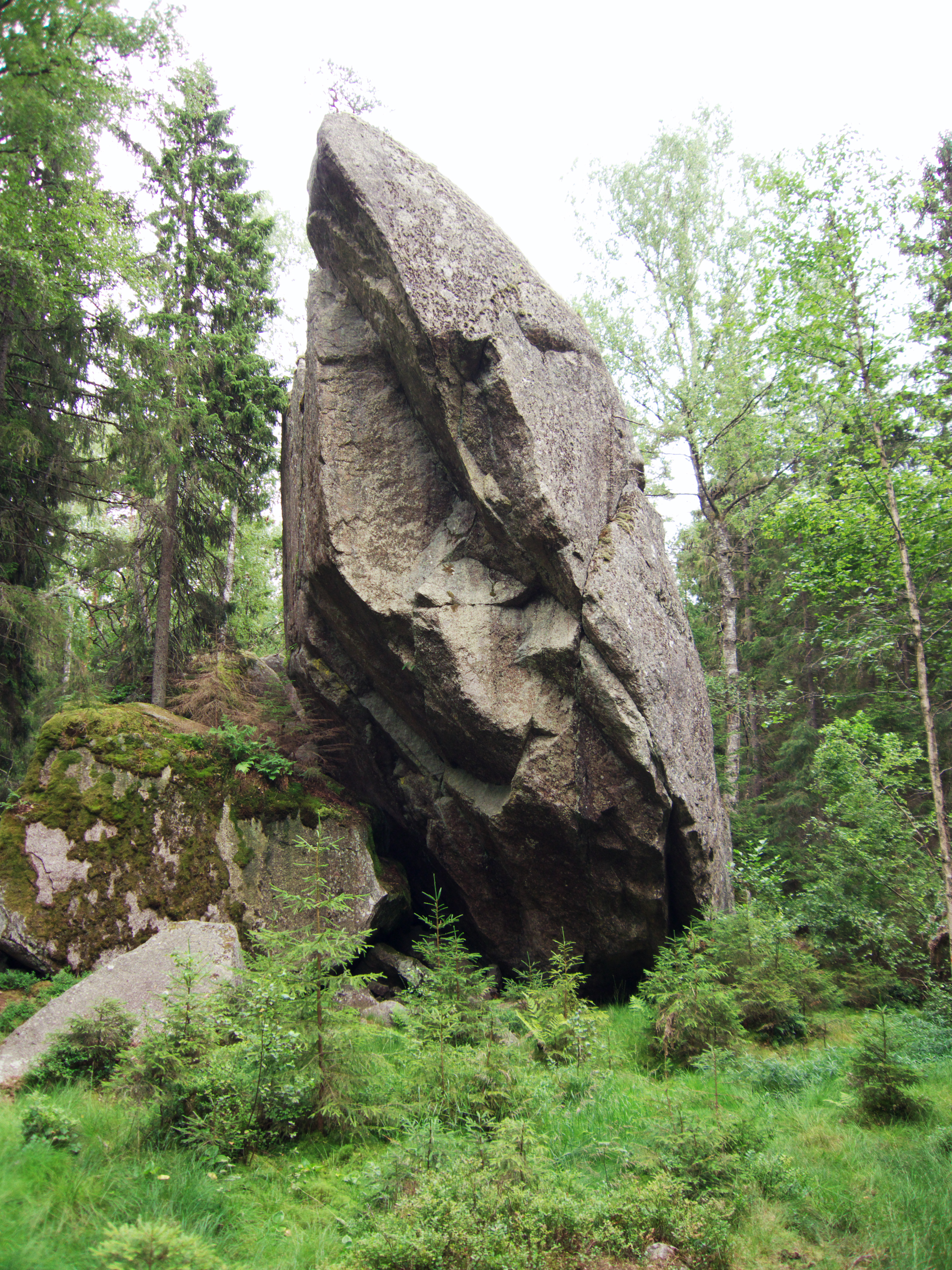
- The Junker Jägare's stone in Tiveden: a boulder 15 metres (49 ft) tall.
- Interactive map of Tiveden National Park
- Location: Västra Götaland and Örebro counties, Sweden
- Nearest city: Karlsborg
- Coordinates: 58°43′00″N 14°36′20″E
- Area: 2,030 hectares (5,000 acres) of which 1,800 hectares (4,400 acres) land
- Established: 1983
- WDPA: 3996

Tiveden National Park (Swedish: Tivedens nationalpark) is a national park situated in the Tiveden forest in the municipalities of Laxå (Örebro County) and Karlsborg (Västra Götaland County), in the historical province of Västergötland in Sweden. It is administered by Naturvårdsverket and the county of Örebro, although a part of its area is located in the county of Västra Götaland. It consists of wild forest over rugged terrain. The national park was established in 1983 and the size was initially 1,350 hectares (3,300 acres). After an extension in 2017, it now covers 2,030 hectares (5,000 acres)

== History ==
At the beginning of the Middle Ages, the forest of Tiveden was a hiding-place for outlaws, who took refuge there.

National parks of Sweden (clickable map)
