= Peter George (businessman) =

British businessman (1943–2007)

- George as chief executive of the Ladbroke Group, c. 1995
- Born: 3 October 1943; Dorking, Surrey, England
- Died: 4 January 2007 (aged 63); Los Angeles, California, US
- Occupation: Businessman
- Years active: 1963–2007
- Employer(s): Ladbroke Group (Hilton Group plc from 1999), 1963–2000; Park Place Entertainment (later Caesars Entertainment and Harrah's Entertainment), 2001–2007
- Known for: Group chief executive of Hilton Group plc (1994–2000)
- Board member of: Hilton Hotels Corporation, US Airways Group, Magna Entertainment Corp., Book4golf.com
- Children: 1

Peter Michael George (3 October 1943 – 4 January 2007) was a British businessman who was group chief executive of Ladbroke Group, renamed Hilton Group plc in 1999, from 1994 to 2000. The company owned the Hilton hotel brand outside the United States and the Ladbrokes betting shops.

The son and grandson of bookmakers, George joined Ladbrokes as a trainee in 1963, became managing director of its racing business in 1976 and a director of the group in 1980, and succeeded Cyril Stein as chief executive in 1994. Under him the group sold its retail and property businesses, returned to casinos, formed an alliance with Hilton Hotels Corporation that reunited the Hilton brand, and bought Stakis in 1999; its purchase of the Coral betting chain was blocked by the government in 1998. After leaving the company in 2000 he moved to the United States, where he sat on the boards of Hilton Hotels Corporation, US Airways Group and Magna Entertainment, and was an executive of Park Place Entertainment (later Caesars Entertainment) and of Harrah's Entertainment until his death.

== Early life and education ==
George as a teenager, c. 1960

George was born in Dorking, Surrey, on 3 October 1943. His father and grandfather were both bookmakers. He was educated at the City of London Freemen's School. He had hoped to become a Royal Air Force pilot, but grew to 6 ft 5 in (1.96 m), too tall to fit into a cockpit. (Note: Management Today described the ambition as "a career as an airline pilot", likewise ended by his height.) A 1994 profile in The Sunday Telegraph said that he had acquired a passion for flying on a visit to RAF Scampton with the school's air training corps, and that after leaving school in 1961 he applied to the RAF and passed the examinations but failed the medical because of his height. He then worked briefly for his father's bookmaking business, Sam George, a firm which his grandfather had started and which had moved from Peckham in south-east London to Dorking during the Second World War.

== Career ==
=== Early career at Ladbrokes ===
George joined Ladbrokes as a trainee in 1963. (Note: The Racing Post and The Guardian give his age on joining as 20; the Financial Times gives 19. He turned 20 in October 1963.) He told The Sunday Telegraph that after a couple of years with the family firm he had decided to gain experience in a bigger business before setting up on his own, and had planned to stay about six months; he wrote to Ladbroke and to the City Tote, and Ladbroke replied first. The Observer wrote in 1994 that his relationship with his father deteriorated after the family split up, and that he then looked elsewhere for work. He started as a settler in Ladbroke's credit betting office in Ganton Street, behind Liberty's, was then sent to the races as clerk to the firm's racecourse representative, and after ten months was brought back as manager of the trading room; at the age of 26 he became the company's head racecourse representative. The Financial Times wrote in 1998 that he became trading director of the racing division in 1972. Cyril Stein, who with his uncle had bought the firm in 1956 and floated it in 1967, recalled: "Peter was a bookmaker's son but he didn't get on with his father and wrote to me for a job. He started working on the field book in the credit office, but he was good with figures and we put him on the rails alongside Dickie Gaskell, though it wasn't long before he took over his own pitch." In December 1972 the Daily Express reported that George, by then a racecourse representative of Ladbrokes, had spent an afternoon at the Hackney greyhound track trying to defeat Tote "riggers", punters who placed large sums in the Tote pool to lengthen the odds on particular dogs; "I don't think it's right that a small group like this should hold bookmakers and the public to ransom", he said. George was later recalled to the company's headquarters in Harrow as head of the betting division, and in 1976 became managing director of Ladbroke Racing. In August 1978 Ladbroke bought the George Racing Organisation, which operated 24 betting shops in north-west England, for £1.4 million in cash; George, as managing director of the racing division, said the purchase gave Ladbroke Racing "good-quality shops capable of substantial growth in localities where it is not currently trading". In March 1979 the Financial Times described him as the man "who runs the betting shop arm of the Ladbrokes group". He joined the board of Ladbroke Group on 1 May 1980, when he was chairman of its retail betting, racecourse management and hi-fi stores divisions.

Ladbroke's report for 1979 described him as "chairman of our business grouping comprising retail betting, racecourse management and hi-fi stores"; the hi-fi stores were the Hardman Radio shops and the Laskys chain, which Ladbroke bought in October 1979. The group's report for 1983 listed him as "Executive Chairman of the Retail Betting and Consumer Electronics Divisions", while its report for 1984 called him "the director responsible for the group's racing activities".

In 1979 Ladbroke lost its casino licences after a court found the company guilty of "disgraceful conduct" over allegations that it had spent £500,000 luring high-rollers from rivals. George, who was then running the racing division, later said that he first learned of the affair from the satirical magazine Private Eye.

In June 1980 the Willesden betting licensing committee renewed 42 of the firm's bookmaking permits and awarded it £5,000 in costs against an objector; George, by then chairman of Ladbrokes Racing, said that all of its bookmaking permits and betting office licences in the British Isles had now been renewed. Ladbrokes then had 1,053 betting shops in the United Kingdom. In January 1982 Ladbroke agreed to sell Lingfield Park racecourse in Surrey, which it had taken over in 1974, for £750,000 to a company controlled by Ron Muddle; George, the divisional chairman responsible, said that "having been successful in saving and since building up the course, and with the expiry of our Aintree contract, we decided the time was right to come out of racecourse ownership". Ladbrokes had managed Aintree for seven years and was to withdraw after the Grand National of 3 April 1982; George spoke as chairman of Ladbroke Racing at the firm's last Grand National weights luncheon in London that January. In April 1982 Ladbroke Racing bought the Demmy Leisure Group, with 73 betting shops in Greater Manchester, Lancashire and Cheshire, for £4.05 million; George, as chairman of Ladbroke Racing, said the purchase would complement its existing shops and give it representation in new areas. In January 1985 the Financial Times reported that Ladbroke had just completed the $13 million (£11.6 million) purchase of Detroit Race Course, becoming the first British company to own and operate an American racetrack; George, the group director who headed Ladbroke Racing, said that "the needs and desires of the better don't vary much from country to country". In February 1986, when bad weather had caused British race meetings to be cancelled, Ladbroke experimented with television commentary of Belgian trotting races in some of its British betting shops, which George described as "very successful". In March 1986, after the first changes to the law on betting shops since their legalisation, Ladbrokes began spending £14 million on refitting its 1,500 shops with banks of television screens showing live sport and with refreshments; George said the changes "herald a new era for Ladbrokes".

In January 1989 The Times reported that Ladbroke had bought the Golden Gate Fields racecourse in San Francisco for $41 million (£23 million), following its purchase of The Meadows racetrack in Pittsburgh, Pennsylvania; George, by then chairman of Ladbroke Racing, said the acquisition established Ladbroke as a major player in the American off-track betting market. The purchase had been announced on 4 January at a news conference in San Francisco, where Ladbroke's executives undertook to run the track until 2002, the year its land lease was due to end; George said that the company had "no intentions of developing the track" and that "the community would be sorry to see it go". In April 1990 Forbes called George, by then Ladbroke's executive chairman of international racing, "the architect of Ladbroke's U.S. foray", and reported that the group was spending nearly $200 million to buy and expand three American racetracks but had yet to open an off-track betting outlet in the United States; George said he had underestimated the strength of the anti-gambling lobby in states such as Pennsylvania and Michigan. In June 1991 Ladbroke won exclusive rights to open four off-track betting operations in Minnesota, similar to those it by then operated in Pennsylvania, through its 50 per cent stake in the state's only racetrack; George, by then joint managing director, called it "a significant breakthrough".

He was appointed vice chairman and joint managing director of Ladbroke Group in 1990, with operating responsibility for its hotels, racing and retail divisions, and held that position until January 1994. In 1990 he recruited Chris Bell, a later chief executive of Ladbrokes. Mike Dillon, Ladbrokes' public relations director, recalled in 1999 that when the firm lost about £1 million by offering longer odds than its rivals against Kribensis for the Champion Hurdle, George, then chief executive of the racing division, was supportive: "He just told me to stick to my principles." In January 1993 Ladbroke Racing announced an agreement with the Hipódromo Argentino de Palermo in Buenos Aires and plans to open at least 70 off-track betting shops in Argentina over five years; George said the group was "delighted to have gained the opportunity to be the leading off-track betting operator in the country".

=== Betting industry roles ===
George was also active in the wider betting industry. According to the Racing Post, he was a leading figure in the formation of the bookmakers' trade association Bola (now the Association of British Bookmakers), was behind the lobbying to cut the rate of betting duty, advised the early promoters of the British Horseracing Board and backed the foundation of Sports Information Services (SIS) in 1987; he also set up a tax-free telephone betting operation in Gibraltar.

In December 1988 The Times reported that George, who was in overall charge of Ladbrokes' 1,770 betting shops in Britain, would tell Lloyds Merchant Bank, which was examining the feasibility of privatising the Tote, that racecourses should take over the Tote's on-course business and that its betting shops should be sold. On 8 February 1989, interviewed by Julian Wilson in a BBC broadcast from Ascot, George called the Jockey Club's aim of obtaining four per cent of betting turnover to finance racing "an obscene demand". He gave evidence on behalf of Bola to the House of Commons Home Affairs Committee's 1990–91 inquiry into the levy on horserace betting; the committee's report, published in May 1991, described him as vice chairman and joint managing director of the Ladbroke Group. In a Commons adjournment debate on starting prices on 19 July 2000, the MP Alan Meale referred to that evidence, saying that George "admitted openly that the company was proactive rather than reactive in terms of hedging bets on race courses".

In November 1996 George accepted an invitation from Lord Wakeham, chairman of the British Horseracing Board, to join a four-member advisory group formed to communicate informally with the Home Secretary. The Times reported that it was the first time racing had brought bookmaking interests into one of its front-line organisations.

=== Chief executive of Ladbroke Group ===
==== Succession ====
In August 1993 the Financial Times wrote that George, then vice-chairman, "had long been seen as heir apparent" to Stein. Ladbroke announced on 2 September 1993 that Stein would retire as chairman at the end of the year and remain a non-executive director for a further three years, that John Jackson would become non-executive chairman, and that George, then 49, would become chief executive. Asked that day about his management style, George offered "honest, straightforward, direct and fair". He took up the post at the start of 1994 and remained vice chairman.

Management Today wrote in 1995 that many had dismissed George as "an empty suit" on his appointment, and that the markets had been dismayed that Stein was followed by a company man rather than a respected outsider. Some long-serving Ladbroke executives questioned whether he had the credentials to succeed Stein; Ron Pollard, Stein's right-hand man, described the new generation of Ladbroke chiefs, George among them, as "more suited to cleaning Mr Stein's shoes than filling them". In March 1995 the Financial Times reported that colleagues credited George with introducing a more open management style at a company previously known for its secrecy, and that he had strengthened the senior team by bringing in Mike Smith, a director of Bowater, to head the betting and gaming division and Tommaso Zanzotto, of American Express, to lead Hilton International, the group's hotel subsidiary. George himself became chairman of Hilton International in March 1996.

==== Restructuring ====
In March 1994, according to the International Directory of Company Histories, George and Jackson took part in the company's first-ever press conference. Within months George had cut the dividend by nearly half, the first such cut in the company's history. Strategic reviews conducted that year concluded that the group should concentrate on hotels and gaming and divest its commercial property and retailing divisions. In September 1994 Ladbroke re-entered the casino business, 15 years after losing its licences, buying three London casinos (Maxims, Chesters and the Golden Horseshoe) for £50 million.

In January 1995 Ladbroke sold Texas Homecare to J Sainsbury for £290 million; George described the sale as "the real achievement of 1994", and the Financial Times reported that Ladbroke planned to separate the property management of its Hilton hotels from their operation. In June 1995 the group sold the Bay Colony Corporate Center, an office development in the Boston area that it had acquired in 1968, for $163 million as part of its programme of selling down its property interests. By late 1995 the property portfolio had been cut to £350 million, from £800 million at the start of 1994, and the company history says that the property division was closed in 1997.

In January 1994 Ladbroke and MAI, a financial services and media group, backed Games for Good Causes, a consortium chaired by Sir Christopher Benson that bid for the licence to run the National Lottery; George sat on its board. George became chief executive in the year the National Lottery was launched, when, according to the Racing Post, industry commentators were forecasting the decline of betting shops and advising him to sell the group's high-street estate. In November 1995 Ladbroke warned that its profits would be lower than the previous year's and its shares fell by 14 per cent; George said that lottery scratchcards had had "a far greater impact on our betting businesses than was anticipated". In late 1995 and early 1996 the group was the subject of takeover rumours as its share price continued to perform poorly, partly because of problems in its British betting operations. The Financial Times's Lex column wrote in January 1996 that Ladbroke's new management had "failed to deliver much recovery", and that George "has been slowly cleaning up the mess left by his predecessors" with his hands tied by a stretched balance sheet.

By 1999, according to The Guardian, George had won support in the City by cutting the dividend and selling Texas, and had persuaded the gaming authorities to let Ladbroke operate casinos again. A Times corporate profile in July 1998 said that he had given the group back the focus it had begun to lose in the last years of Stein's 37-year stewardship, and described him as "a loyal Stein lieutenant". Interviewed for a Financial Times profile in 1998, Lord Janner, a former non-executive director of Ladbroke, called him "genuinely gentle and kind and self-effacing but ... also very determined and focused", and Jackson said: "Peter was never afraid to say, 'Cyril, you can't do that'." Jackson added that George, as a bookmaker's son, "likes to define the risks being run". Management Today wrote in January 1998 that although George, as Stein's protégé, "was not initially the appointment investors had been hoping for", his actions had "proved as resolute as any outsider's": the company had brought in more than 100 new senior executives, and after the interim results of 1997 George had declared its recovery phase over.

==== Alliance with Hilton Hotels Corporation ====
Press conference announcing the Ladbroke–Hilton alliance, 1996, with name cards for George, John Jackson and Stephen Bollenbach

Hilton International had been separated from the American Hilton Hotels Corporation in 1964 and bought by Ladbroke in 1987. The two companies had expanded into each other's territories in the 1980s, and Hilton International sued Hilton Hotels Corporation in 1991. The court that tried the case found that on 11 October 1991 Stein and George, then vice chairman of Hilton International, had lunched at the London Hilton on Park Lane with Barron Hilton, chairman of Hilton Hotels Corporation, and one of his senior executives, at what it called "a cordial, pleasant luncheon" where the matters in dispute "never came up"; Hilton International filed its lawsuit on 16 October. Presenting Ladbroke's interim results in 1995, George said: "We are now in a state of conflict, but are trying to work out a better strategy", and that executives of the two groups were meeting regularly. By March 1996 he had met twice with Stephen Bollenbach, who had become chief executive of the American company the month before. On 29 August 1996 the two companies announced heads of agreement for a worldwide alliance to reunite the Hilton brand after 32 years. They were to cooperate on sales and marketing, loyalty programmes and hotel development, and Hilton Hotels Corporation was to take a 5 per cent stake in Ladbroke. George said it had been his ambition since becoming chief executive "to reunite the Hilton brand", and that a full merger and a joint venture had also been considered. He forecast that within two or three years the alliance could be worth "tens of millions of dollars of extra profit to each company". The agreement was signed in January 1997, and under it George joined the board of Hilton Hotels Corporation while its chief executive, Steve Bollenbach, joined the Ladbroke board.

On 21 October 1996 George appeared at a special meeting of the Nevada State Gaming Control Board in Las Vegas in support of the applications of Ladbroke Group to be registered as a publicly traded company in Nevada and of its Nevada subsidiary, Ladbroke Nevada, Inc., for a licence as a gaming-machine distributor, together with the applications of George, John Jackson, Brian Wallace and Mike Smith for findings of suitability as officers and directors. He told the board that the alliance with Hilton Hotels Corporation was the most likely vehicle for Ladbroke's entry into the Nevada market, and that the agreement contained no non-competition provisions. The Las Vegas Review-Journal reported him as saying: "Anybody who's in the gaming business anywhere in the world has ambitions to be in Las Vegas. We have to be here, and I want to be here in a meaningful way." The board approved the application that day, and the Nevada Gaming Commission approved it on 24 October 1996. The board's licensing record lists Ladbroke Nevada, Inc. as approved on 24 October 1996, started on 1 January 1997 and closed on 5 February 1999.

In August 1997 George said that a full merger of the two companies was a distinct possibility, and in 1999 The Guardian wrote that he had made no secret of his hopes for one. Hilton Hotels Corporation's announcement of his death said that George had worked with Bollenbach to create the alliance, and that it ultimately paved the way for the American company's acquisition of Hilton International, which was completed in February 2006.

==== Hotel openings ====
In March 1996 George, as chairman of Hilton International, was in Belfast for the announcement of the Belfast Hilton, a £20 million, 187-bedroom hotel in the Lanyon Place development beside the Waterfront Hall. He said that "our commitment to Belfast pre-dated the ceasefire", and that discussions on the hotel had been going on for many months and would have continued regardless.

On 1 November 1997 the Prince of Wales officially opened the Sandton Hilton in Johannesburg, a hotel that had been under construction for Hilton International, then owned by Ladbroke.

In May 1998 George joined Alfred Akirov, chairman of Alrov (Israel) Ltd, which built and owns the hotel, at the official opening of the Jerusalem Hilton; the guests of honour included President Ezer Weizman.

On 30 September 1998, weeks after the Russian financial crisis began, George and the mayor of Moscow, Yury Luzhkov, signed an agreement in London to develop the first Hilton hotel in Russia, a 312-bedroom hotel on Nikitsky Boulevard that was to cost £35 million and be managed by Hilton International. George said: "We've been involved in the project for 18 months. Obviously, circumstances have changed during that time but we are in this business for the long term."

==== Executive pay ====
In April 1997 The Independent reported that George's pay for 1996 had risen to almost £1.3 million from £481,000 the year before, a rise of 266 per cent, and that the company's long-term incentive scheme, introduced when he became chief executive, "came under attack". The scheme rewarded directors according to share-price performance over a rolling three-year period; George received £600,000 under it for 1996, and three other directors shared £800,000. Over the three years to 1996 the company's share price rose 42 per cent, which placed it 23rd among 93 surviving constituents of the FTSE 100. Paul Heath, a leisure analyst at UBS, said the scheme "came into effect at a usefully low point in the share price cycle" and that shareholders wanted incentives more closely related to earnings and return on capital; another analyst defended share price as a measure of shareholder value. The company's remuneration committee, chaired by John Jackson, acknowledged that the scheme could be over-generous and proposed changes for the next annual general meeting: a performance measure combining share price and earnings per share, awards in shares rather than cash, and a cap of 100 per cent of salary. George had himself sat on the remuneration committee until 24 July 1995, when he resigned from it following the publication of the Greenbury report on directors' pay; the board reported that the company accordingly complied with best practice on remuneration committees. The same annual report listed him as a member of the board's compliance committee, which reviewed the group's adherence to gaming and betting laws, and disclosed that his service contract contained "a provision for liquidated damages on termination", inserted in return for a reduction from 36 to 24 months in the notice that the company had to give him.

George's pay for 1997 was £745,000, made up of a basic salary of £450,000 and a bonus. The Independent reported that the fall of more than 40 per cent reflected the timing of payments from the incentive scheme, and that his underlying pay had risen sharply. For 1998 he received £1.689 million in salary, performance-related bonuses and share option gains, including £573,000 under the long-term incentive plan, which made him the group's highest-paid director; The Scotsman noted that the figure was not directly comparable with that for 1997. The Financial Times put his pay for 1998 at £1.32 million, including the £573,000 from the incentive plan, and reported that his basic salary rose to £495,500 from January 1999. The group's annual report for 1999 gave his pay for that year as £554,000, made up of a basic salary of £495,000, a bonus of £25,000 and benefits of £34,000.

==== Coral ====
At the end of 1997 Ladbroke agreed to buy the Coral betting chain from Bass, (Note: The company history and a contemporary BBC Ceefax report give the price as about £375 million; The Times and the Las Vegas Sun give £363 million.) a purchase that George had sought. The deal was unconditional, and Ladbroke arranged to sell 133 shops to the Tote in the hope of avoiding a referral to the competition authorities. The purchase attracted parliamentary opposition: in February 1998 an early day motion tabled by Neil Gerrard urged the government to refer it to the Monopolies and Mergers Commission, and a June 1998 motion tabled by Alex Salmond argued that the merger "would create an unacceptable monopoly for Ladbrokes in the off-course betting industry".

The President of the Board of Trade, Margaret Beckett, referred the purchase to the commission on 31 March 1998; George expressed disappointment at the decision. The commission reported in September that the merger was anticompetitive, and the Secretary of State for Trade and Industry, Peter Mandelson, ordered Ladbroke to sell the bulk of the acquired shops within six months. George said the commission had looked at the deal "through the wrong end of the telescope". He told the Financial Times that Ladbroke had twice taken informal guidance from the Office of Fair Trading before buying Coral: "We have not acted improperly or without responsibility, yet we are tried, found guilty and sentenced – and there's nothing I can do about it." He said that the responsibility for going ahead was his, and that he would do the same again rather than let Nomura, the owner of William Hill, buy the chain.

On 22 December 1998 Ladbroke announced the sale of Coral's British shops to Morgan Grenfell Private Equity for £390 million; the company history gives February 1999 as the date of the sale. Ladbroke kept Coral's shops in Ireland and Jersey. In the company's announcement George said: "Whilst we would have liked to have kept Coral, the excellent price that we have achieved underlines the long term potential of the off-course betting industry, in which we remain the largest operator." The Independent commented that George had "ridden a winner", selling a business he had been ordered to dispose of at a premium of about 10 per cent.

==== Stakis and the Hilton Group name ====
In February 1999 Ladbroke agreed to acquire Stakis, a hotel and casino group, in a deal that valued it at about £1.2 billion. (Note: Reports of the price range from £1.16 billion and £1.2 billion to £1.3 billion, £1.5 billion and £1.6 billion.) George said the acquisition would "double our number of hotel rooms to over 16,000 and make us clearly the number one four-star luxury hotel chain in Britain". The Stakis chief executive, David Michels, took charge of Ladbroke's hotels division. The purchase was completed in March, and on 14 May 1999 shareholders approved the change of the company's name to Hilton Group plc.

Reporting half-year profits of £127.5 million in August 1999, George said that the group would expand its seven-year-old Gibraltar office, set up to take large bets from offshore clients, into a major call centre; bets taken there carried a 3 per cent charge, against the 9 per cent levied in Britain. He said that a merger with Hilton Hotels Corporation "is never off" the agenda, "but we are concentrating on strengthening the existing alliance".

==== Departure ====
In May 2000 it was reported that George was to step down as chief executive, ending a 37-year career with the group. The Independent wrote that he had been widely expected to succeed Jackson as chairman, and The Guardian that he wished to spend more time with his new wife in the United States and had won praise for keeping the group's betting business stable despite the arrival of the National Lottery. The announcement was expected at the company's annual meeting on 26 May 2000. The company confirmed that he would stand aside as chief executive on 31 May and remain vice chairman and a director until his retirement at the end of August; Jackson said that he "has done an excellent job and hands over a business in good shape to a worthy successor leading a first class team". Michels succeeded him, and George left the company in August 2000. (Note: Hilton Hotels Corporation's proxy statements give June 2000 as the end of his term as group chief executive; the US Airways proxy statement and Companies House records give August 2000 for his retirement and the end of his directorships.) In November 2000 The Scotsman, citing Sunday Business, reported that he had received a payoff of nearly £3 million, where the City had believed the figure to be about £1 million, and that he had resigned "following shareholder discontent". The Sunday Business report said that George had resigned from a post paying £473,000 a year, and quoted a Hilton spokesman, who declined to comment on the size of the payment, as saying that "Peter George had a contract and that contract was honoured"; it also recalled that Jackson had said at the time of the resignation that "there was no ousting and no row". Hilton Group's annual report for 2000 recorded that £1,373,000 was paid to George "as compensation for loss of office"; with a basic salary of £350,000 and benefits of £17,000 for the part of the year he served, his total for the year, excluding gains on share options, was £1,740,000. The report added that the company would continue his healthcare and personal accident cover until May 2002.

On the day of the annual meeting George told the Financial Times that the question of his succeeding Jackson as chairman had never been raised, and that "it's often very difficult for a chief executive to move up to a non-executive role"; the newspaper reported that analysts regarded the 1996 alliance with Hilton Hotels Corporation as his main achievement, and that hotels by then accounted for 70 per cent of the group's operating profits, compared with less than 50 per cent when he took over in 1994. The Economist reported that he had stepped down early, at 56, arguing that "the hotels business needs to be run by professionals". He moved to Los Angeles, where he already had a second home, to live with his wife, Kay.

=== Later career in the United States ===
George remained a director of US Airways Group, whose board he had joined in November 1998, and of Hilton Hotels Corporation, which was based in Beverly Hills. On the Hilton board he was a member of the Diversity Committee, and in 2006 he was nominated for re-election to a three-year term. He remained a Hilton director until his death, and on 18 January 2007 the board elected Matthew J. Hart, the company's president and chief operating officer, to fill the vacant seat. He had joined the board of Magna Entertainment Corp., a racetrack operator, in March 2000; he later chaired its special independent committee, set up to review real estate transactions with Magna International, and was chairman pro tem of its audit committee. In January 2001 he was appointed to the board of Book4golf.com, an online tee-time booking company based in Toronto. He was not among the nominees for re-election at Magna's annual meeting on 30 April 2003, and was replaced on the audit committee that day. US Airways' proxy statement for 2002 described him as a member of the board's Nominating and Human Resources Committee. US Airways' proxy statement for 2004 lists him among its former directors.

He joined Park Place Entertainment, a casino operator, as head of international development, with the title of senior vice president and managing director of its International Group from October 2001. The appointment was announced on 30 October 2001; he had most recently been a consultant to the company on international gaming issues. On 31 March 2003 Park Place announced that he would also take responsibility for its gaming development projects in the United States, with the title of senior vice president for development and managing director of international operations. Park Place, which had acquired Caesars World in 1999, changed its name to Caesars Entertainment in January 2004, and was bought in 2005 by Harrah's Entertainment, where George was senior vice president of international development until his death. Park Place appointed him to lead its planned expansion into Britain, where the government was preparing to relax the gambling laws. In August 2002 he led a group of the company's executives to London for talks with Anschutz Entertainment Group about a casino at the Millennium Dome. In November 2003 he told the Financial Times that it was time for the company to start taking deregulation "much more seriously", but that it needed to understand what the government was trying to achieve: "We don't want to invest hundreds of millions of pounds without knowing what the end result is going to be." In October 2004 Caesars announced a joint venture with Quintain Estates and Development to build a casino resort beside Wembley Stadium in London, its first project in Europe; George, as senior vice president for development and managing director of the International Group, spoke for the company on its work with host communities.

== Community work ==
According to James Morton's 1998 account of the Prince of Wales's work with Business in the Community, the Homeground Partnership in Liverpool originated in a 1991 "Seeing is Believing" visit by business leaders to homelessness organisations; companies able to help with accommodation were heavily represented, and George, of Ladbroke, considered how his company could contribute and settled on converting the empty former Vernons building on Scotland Road. In December 1992 the Prince, president of Business in the Community, visited Homeground, where Ladbroke, of which George was then joint managing director, had handed over its disused Vernons football pools headquarters to be turned into a hostel and training centre for young homeless people. Morton reported that over three years the project had seen 592 people pass through, of whom 155 had found their own accommodation and 163 had found work. In December 1995, The Sunday Times reported that George, by then chief executive of Ladbroke, had visited Liverpool to see a project converting an old office building into a training centre, and that the next day he offered 40,000 square feet of surplus Ladbroke offices for use as a hostel for homeless people.

In 1997 George was a council member of Business in the Community and a trustee of Industry in Education. Morton named him among the senior business executives who were themselves active and had encouraged colleagues to contribute to regeneration.

On 16 July 2000 Hilton Group sponsored the Hilton Group Trophy, a polo match at Cirencester Park Polo Club in aid of The Gurkha Welfare Trust, in which the Prince of Wales led the Lovelocks team against Cirencester Park. George, then vice chairman, presented a cheque for £30,000 to the Trust's chairman, General Sir Sam Cowan.

== Personal life ==
The break-up of George's first marriage was attributed in part to overwork. He admitted that Ladbroke was his "first love", saying: "If they opened me up, Ladbroke would be carved on my heart." He had remarried by 1999, and was survived by his American wife, Kay, and by a daughter.

A 1999 profile in The Guardian described George as "quiet, thoughtful and self-effacing" and, for a man "steeped in the sport of kings", "strangely detached from it": he owned no racehorses, played golf, and limited his own bets to £200.

== Death ==
George died of lung cancer at his home in Los Angeles on 4 January 2007, aged 63. Hilton Hotels Corporation's announcement described a lengthy illness and named two charities for donations in his memory: the American Lung Association and a Peter George Tribute Fund at the Roy Castle Lung Cancer Foundation in Liverpool. The Daily Telegraph reported that he had died "after a long battle with lung cancer" and described him as "one of those rare creatures in British business: someone who gave an entire career to a single company". A memorial gathering was held on 8 March 2007 in the Wellington ballroom of the London Hilton on Park Lane.

The Racing Post obituary carried tributes from former colleagues. Stein said that George's "strength was in betting. He came from that background, and that was always his big interest", and Chris Bell, by then chief executive of Ladbrokes, said that without him "in the post-Cyril era, Ladbrokes would not have survived".

== Notes ==
Business positions
Preceded by Cyril Stein	Chief Executive of Ladbroke Group (renamed Hilton Group plc in 1999); 1994–2000	Succeeded by David Michels
