= Kato Drys =

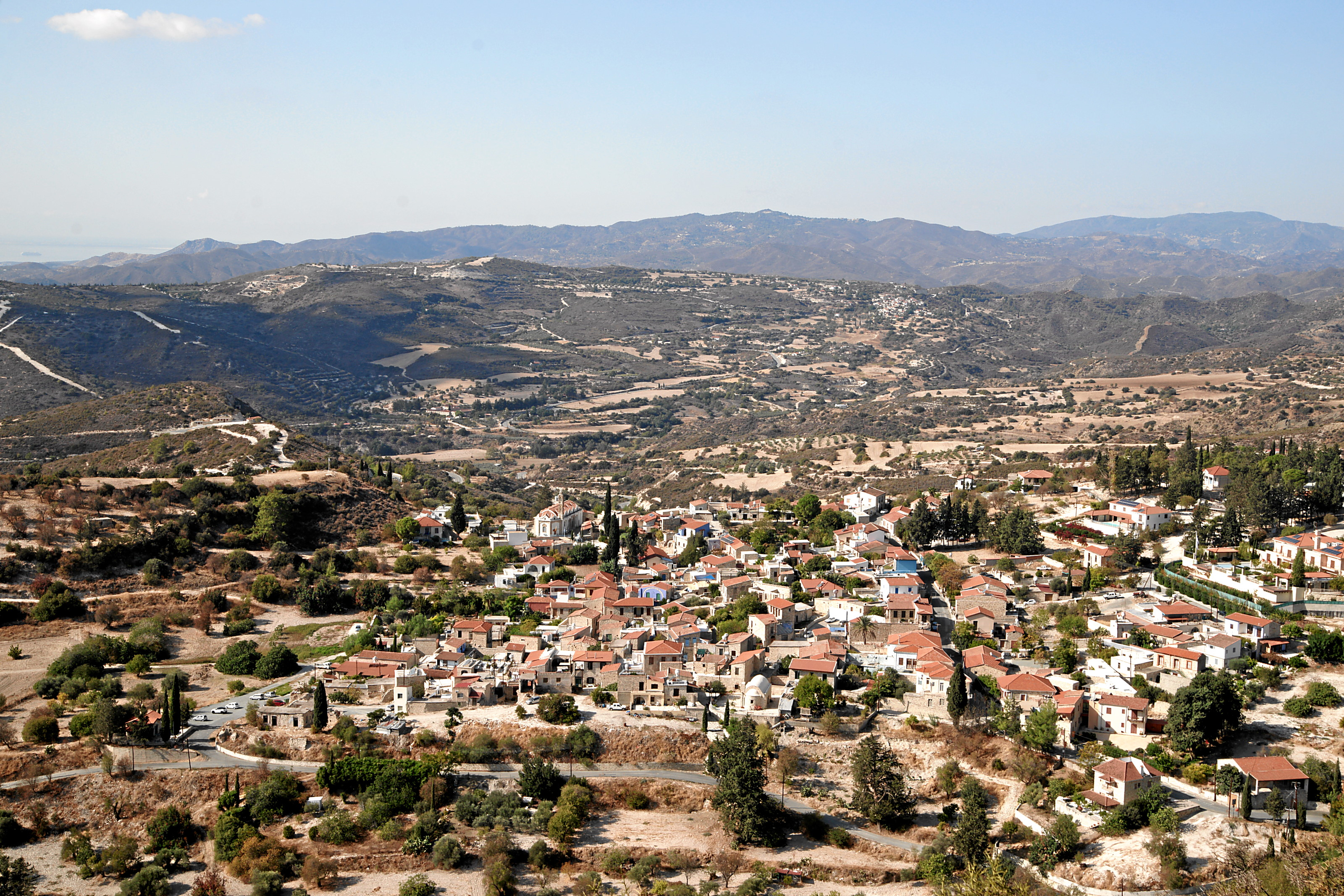

- Location in Cyprus
- Coordinates: 34°51′3″N 33°18′15″E
- Country: Cyprus
- District: Limassol District

Population (2011)
  - Total: 129
- Time zone: UTC+2 (EET)
  - Summer (DST): UTC+3 (EEST)

Kato Drys (Greek: Kάτω Δρυς) is a small village in Cyprus, southwest of Larnaca.

Its average altitude is 520 metres (1,710 ft) above sea level. The village is set in hilly terrain with narrow, deep valleys, through which the Agios Minas river flows.

Kato Drys is pictured on the Cyprus one pound note.

Neophytos of Cyprus was born in Kato Drys in 1134. The house in which he was born still stands today. Reo Stakis (1913–2001) was also born in the village.

There is a small church dedicated to Neophytos on a hill near the village.
