= David Michels =

British business executive (born 1946)

Sir David Michels
- Born: 1946 (age 79–80); London, England
- Education: Clarke’s College; Hendon Technical College; London Hotel School
- Occupation: Business executive

Sir David Michels (born 1946) is a British business executive. A former Deputy Chairman of Marks & Spencer, he is the co-owner and Chairman of Michels & Taylor, "an asset manager for 81 hotels."

== Early life ==
Michels was born in 1946 in Willesden, London, England. His father, a German Jew, escaped to England shortly before World War II. Settling in North London, he ran a restaurant.

He was educated at Clarke’s College and Hendon Technical College. He also graduated from the London Hotel School.

== Career ==
Michels started his career in the hotel business by working for Grand Metropolitan for seventeen years. He then served as Managing Director of Hilton UK and later Executive President Worldwide Marketing for Hilton. He served as the Chief Executive of Stakis Hotels from 1990 to 1999. In 2000, he became chief executive for Hilton Group after Peter George stepped down. He remained in the role until 2007.

He served as the Deputy Chairman of Marks & Spencer from 2006 to February 2012. He was also the Deputy Chairman of easyJet.

He is the former President of the British Hospitality Association. He served on the board of directors of the Jumeirah Group (now part of Dubai Holding), the Savoy Hotel (now part of FRHI Hotels & Resorts), British Land, RAB Capital, the Arcadia Group and Paramount Restaurants.

He serves as the co-owner and Chairman of Michels & Taylor. He is also the Chairman of London & Capital.

He serves on the Boards of Directors of Strategic Hotels & Resorts. He is also a partner of Burlywood Capital. Additionally, he is the President of the Tourism Alliance, and the Institute of Hospitality.

A "workaholic", he works "80-hour week[s]." He was knighted in 2006 for his work in the hospitality industry.

== Philanthropy ==
Michels attended a fundraiser for the Anne Frank Trust UK in 2010. In May 2012, he spoke at a fundraiser taking place at the Royal Automobile Club which raised £50,000 for Langdon, a Jewish non-profit organisation which provides housing for the disabled. He stressed the need for the disabled to be able to work.

== Personal life ==
He plays poker in London and Las Vegas as well as online.
