= Crest Hotels =

UK hotel company

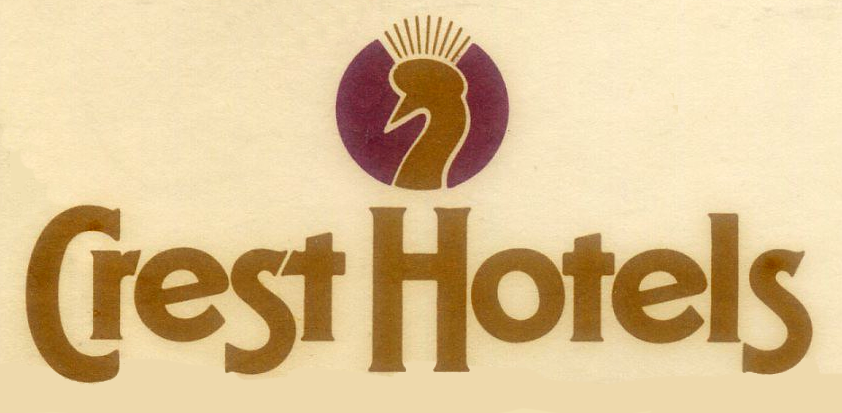
- Industry: Hospitality
- Founded: 1969
- Defunct: 1990
- Headquarters: Banbury, UK
- Area served: Europe
- Parent: Bass-Charrington

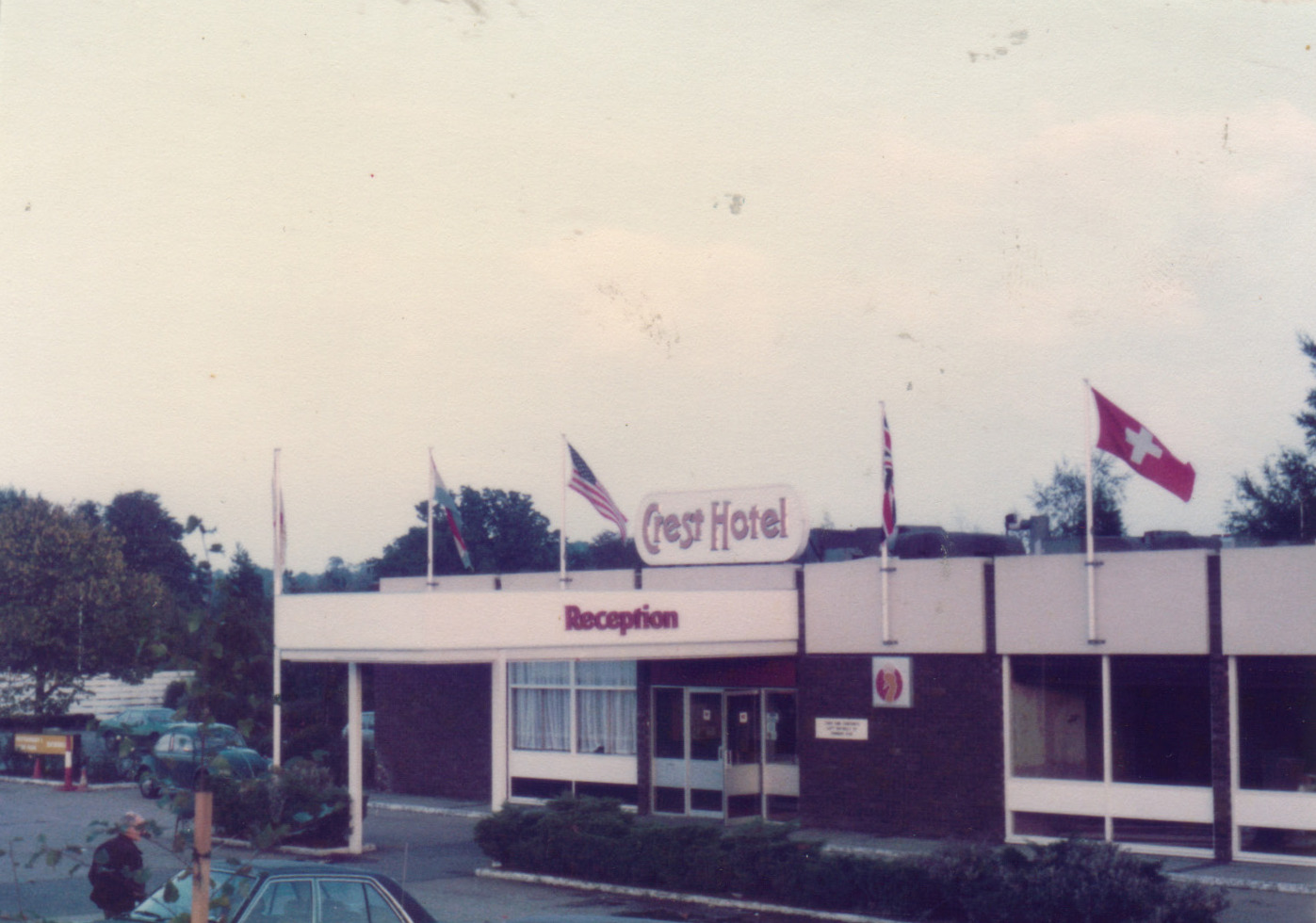
Crest Hotel at South Mimms in 1980

Crest Hotels Limited was a Bass-Charrington subsidiary operating the hotel interests of the brewery company in the United Kingdom. Crest's headquarters were in the former Hunt Edmunds brewery premises in Banbury, Oxfordshire.

== History ==
In 1969 Bass transferred all its hotels, which had previously traded under the Bass, Mitchells and Butler's and Charrington's brands, into the Crest Hotels portfolio.

Bass bought the European hotel interests of the Esso Petroleum Company in 1972. These were modern, purpose-built hotels located in the United Kingdom, the Netherlands, Belgium, Italy, Germany and Austria. The deal involved 18 Esso Motor Hotels, of which ten in the United Kingdom, three were in the Netherlands, two in Belgium and three in Italy. There were also nine German hotels and one Austrian hotel which were leased from Esso. The hotels in UK were absorbed by Crest and the European hotels were supervised by a senior management team based in Germany. In 1976 Crest rebranded their hotels in EuroCrest and decided to expand in Germany.

In 1990, the group was bought by Trusthouse Forte and rebranded as Forte Crest before later being absorbed into the Posthouse chain.
