= Ladbrokes =

British-based betting and gambling company

- Formerly: Ladbroke Group plc (1967–1999); Hilton Group plc (1999–2006); Ladbrokes plc (2006–2016); Ladbrokes Coral Group plc (2016–2018)
- Type: Subsidiary
- Industry: Gambling
- Founded: 1886
- Headquarters: London, England
- Products: Sports betting, online casino, online poker, online bingo
- Parent: Entain (since 2018)

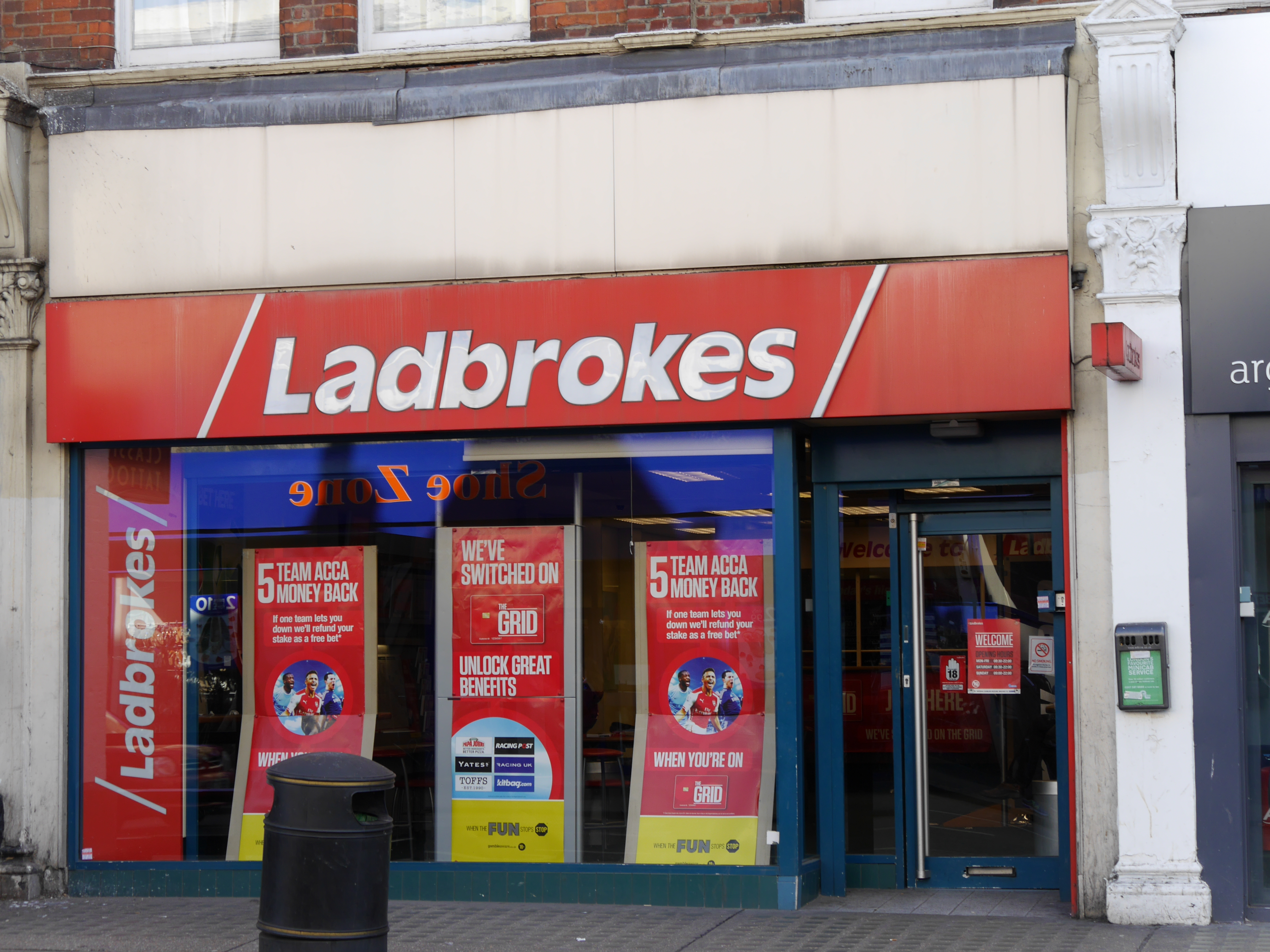
Ladbrokes, North End Road, Fulham, London (2015)

Ladbrokes is a British gambling company established in 1886. Its product offering includes sports betting, online casino, online poker, and online bingo.

Founded as a firm of commission agents and for many years a credit bookmaker to wealthy clients, Ladbrokes was bought in 1956 by Cyril Stein and his uncle, built a chain of betting shops after they were legalised in 1961, and was floated on the London Stock Exchange in 1967 as Ladbroke Group. Under Stein the group diversified into hotels, casinos, property and retailing, and in 1987 it bought Hilton International, the owner of the Hilton hotel brand outside the United States. In the 1990s it sold its property and retail businesses to concentrate on hotels and gambling, and in 1999 it was renamed Hilton Group plc. After selling its hotels to Hilton Hotels Corporation in 2006, the company took the name Ladbrokes plc.

In November 2016, Ladbrokes merged with Coral to create Ladbrokes Coral Group. Since March 2018, it has been owned by Entain. Prior to its sale, Ladbrokes Coral was listed on the London Stock Exchange, and was a member of the FTSE 250 Index.

== History ==
=== Origins to 1993 ===
The company was founded by Messrs. Schwind and Pennington in 1886, as commission agents for horses trained at Ladbroke Hall in Warwickshire. The name Ladbrokes was adopted in 1902, when Arthur Bendir joined the partnership, and operations were moved to London.

Ladbrokes' London offices were first in the vicinity of the Strand, moved to Hanover Square in 1906 and, in 1913, to Six Old Burlington Street, Mayfair. From 1913 to 1956, Ladbrokes' clientele was exclusively drawn from the British aristocracy and upper classes, many of whom were members of the elite gentlemen's clubs in the St James's area of Central London.

Unusually for the times, Ladbrokes' principal longtime representative on British racecourses was a woman, Helen Vernet. Having joined the firm in 1919, she was made a partner in 1928 and remained with the firm until shortly before her death in 1956, at the age of 80.

Following the end of World War II, Ladbrokes' fortunes were in steady decline, thanks to an austere postwar economic climate, a dwindling client base, and reluctance to change the firm's specialised approach to bookmaking. As a result, in 1956 the company was acquired by Mark Stein, a bookmaker who traded as Max Parker, and his nephew Cyril Stein for a reported £100,000.

Cyril Stein became managing director and set out to widen the firm's client base, advertising for new account holders in magazines and in Sunday newspapers. In 1959 the firm set up Ladbrokes (Football) Ltd to offer fixed-odds betting on football matches; its rival William Hill accused it of infringing the copyright in its betting coupons, and the case went to the House of Lords, which ruled in Hill's favour. In October 1963, when Harold Macmillan resigned as prime minister, Ladbrokes became the first bookmaker to offer political betting, taking bets on the contest for the leadership of the Conservative Party. On the last Saturday of December 1963 the football results went against Ladbrokes, which lost over £1 million in one afternoon.

In 1961, the government legalised betting shops under the Betting and Gaming Act. As managing director, Stein used profits from the business's traditional areas to establish a chain of betting shops. In 1962 Ladbrokes bought a chain of betting shops on the Isle of Wight. The company first diversified outside the betting business by taking a major stake in the Dragonara Palace in Malta, a casino and hotel, which opened its first phase in 1964.

Parker died in 1966 and Stein became chairman, a position he held until 1993. In 1967, Ladbrokes was floated on the London Stock Exchange, valued at £2 million. From 1967 to 1973, Ladbrokes' retail betting business grew from less than 50 shops to 1,135, and the company expanded its ventures to include bingo clubs, hotels under the Dragonara brand, casinos in London, holiday centres, and real estate investments. In 1973, Terry Rogers received £250,000 and 100,000 Ladbrokes shares when he sold his stake in a 53-shop chain of English betting shops to Ladbrokes. Through its 1972 acquisition of the London & Leeds Development Corporation, Ladbrokes entered property development, with office projects in the eastern United States and in Paris, Amsterdam and Brussels, and in 1973 it opened three moderately priced hotels in the United Kingdom.

In 1975, Ladbrokes moved into racecourse management by purchasing Lingfield Park. In the same year, when the Aintree course, home of the Grand National, appeared about to be sold to a property developer, Stein signed an agreement for Ladbrokes to sponsor and manage it for seven years. This was followed by the acquisitions in 1976 of Perry Barr Stadium and Totalisators and Greyhound Holdings, which owned six greyhound racing stadia at Brough Park, Crayford & Bexleyheath, Leeds, Gosforth, Willenhall and Monmore. Arthur Aldridge, formerly of the Greyhound Racing Association, joined Ladbrokes as Racing Director.

The company was rocked by scandal in 1979 with the exposure of illegal marketing schemes at its London casinos, including the bribery of a police officer to obtain information about high rollers at competing casinos. Its employees had noted the registration numbers of cars parked outside rival clubs, in particular the Playboy clubs run by Victor Lownes, traced the owners through the police computer and sent them invitations to gamble at Ladbrokes; Lownes drew the authorities' attention to the practice, and Ladbrokes was deemed not "fit and proper" to hold casino licences. As a result, Ladbrokes was forced to close its four casinos in London, which accounted for roughly 40% of the company's profits. In October 1979, while its appeal was pending, the group proposed to transfer its gaming operations to a separate holding company, City and Provincial Gaming Holdings, in whose activities the Ladbroke board would have no part. It abandoned the appeal on 20 May 1980, when its last London casino, the Park Tower, closed; the Hertford, Park Lane and Ladbroke clubs had already shut.

In August 1978 Ladbrokes bought the George Racing Organisation, which operated 24 betting shops in north-west England, for £1.4 million in cash, and in April 1982 Ladbroke Racing bought the Demmy Leisure Group, with 73 betting shops in Greater Manchester, Lancashire and Cheshire, for £4.05 million. The company left racecourse management in 1982. After seven years managing Aintree it withdrew following the Grand National of 3 April, and in January 1982 it agreed to sell Lingfield Park for £750,000 to a company controlled by the businessman Ron Muddle, keeping the house and surrounding land that it used as a management training centre; Peter George, the divisional chairman responsible, said that "having been successful in saving and since building up the course, and with the expiry of our Aintree contract, we decided the time was right to come out of racecourse ownership".

After losing its casino licences, Ladbrokes expanded its racing business in continental Europe and the United States. In 1984 it bought Le Tiercé S.A., a chain of betting shops in Belgium, and at the beginning of 1985 it completed the $13 million purchase of Detroit Race Course, becoming the first British company to own and operate an American racetrack. In April 1986 it was awarded exclusive rights to open off-track betting shops in the Netherlands. After legislation in 1986 allowed live television coverage of sport to be shown in betting shops, Ladbrokes joined William Hill and other bookmakers in setting up Satellite Information Services (SIS) to transmit horse and greyhound racing to the shops.

Ladbrokes also operated a hi-fi retail division. Its hi-fi stores, the Hardman Radio shops of North West England, came with Leisure & General Holdings, which it took over in early 1978, and in October 1979 it bought the 34-shop Laskys chain from Audiotronic Holdings for about £3.2 million in cash, becoming the largest specialist hi-fi retailer in the United Kingdom. It planned to bring the Laskys and Hardman shops together under the Laskys name during 1980. In October 1986 Ladbrokes agreed to sell Laskys, which then had 53 shops and had lost £645,000 before tax on sales of £80 million in the year to June, to Granada Group for £30.25 million. Ladbrokes said the sale would let it concentrate on Texas Homecare.

In 1986 Ladbrokes acquired Home Charm Group, which operated a chain of more than 100 DIY stores under the Texas Homecare name, for £200 million. In the same year it sold a number of businesses in its entertainment division, including amusement arcades, bingo halls and local newspapers. In October 1987, it acquired Hilton International from Allegis Corporation for £645 million, gaining 91 hotels and the rights to the Hilton brand outside the United States. The bid was Ladbrokes' second attempt in two years to buy the chain, and the purchase gave it hotels in 44 countries; a year later it renamed most of its existing hotels in the United Kingdom as Hilton National.

In the United States, Ladbrokes bought The Meadows racetrack near Pittsburgh for $17 million in December 1988 and Golden Gate Fields, near San Francisco, for $41 million in January 1989; Peter George, by then chairman of Ladbroke Racing, said the second purchase established the company as a major player in the growing American off-track betting market. In 1989 Ladbrokes bought Thomson T-Line and with it the Vernons football pools business. In August 1991 the company reported a 38 per cent fall in half-year pre-tax profit, to £98.2 million, which Stein attributed to the effects of the Gulf War, and launched a rights issue to raise £464 million, which it said would be used to reduce its debt of £1.6 billion and to continue the expansion of Hilton International. In January 1993 Ladbroke Racing announced an agreement with the operator of the Palermo racecourse in Buenos Aires giving it exclusive rights to distribute the course's pari-mutuel betting throughout Argentina, where it planned to open at least 70 off-track betting shops over five years.

Ladbrokes gave the disused Vernons headquarters in Liverpool to be turned into Homeground, a hostel and training centre for young homeless people, following a visit by senior hotel executives to see homelessness in London on the Prince of Wales's "Seeing is Believing" programme; the Prince, as president of Business in the Community, visited the Homeground Partnership on 8 December 1992.

=== Ladbroke and Hilton Group (1994–2006) ===
Press conference announcing the Ladbroke Group–Hilton Hotels Corporation alliance, 1996

Stein retired in January 1994, under pressure from investors because of the company's rising debts and losses. John Jackson became non-executive chairman and Peter George, who had joined the company in 1963 and its board in 1980, became group chief executive. Under the new management and direction of George, Ladbrokes focused on its core areas of hotels and gambling, and began to divest other parts of its business. Texas Homecare was sold to Sainsbury's in January 1995 for £290 million. For 1994 the group reported a loss of £229.8 million, which reflected provisions made against Texas Homecare, and it cut its dividend by nearly half, the first such cut in its history. The group's debt had reached £1.8 billion in 1993, with gearing of between 80 and 90 per cent; by the end of 1997 it had brought in more than 100 new senior executives, and George had declared the recovery phase over.

In January 1994 Ladbrokes and MAI, a media and financial services group, announced Games for Good Causes, a joint venture to bid for the licence to run the National Lottery, in which each was to hold a third of the equity; Malcolm Hughes of Vernons was named as its chief executive. The lottery began in November 1994 and hurt the group's British gambling businesses, particularly Vernons; Management Today reported in November 1995 that it had taken an estimated £10–11 million from the profits of the betting business in the first half of that year, and that the company had announced more than 300 redundancies in August.

Ladbrokes' extensive portfolio of commercial and residential real estate, valued at £1 billion in 1993, was sold off in pieces and by March 1997 was down to £70 million. As part of its redoubled focus on gambling, Ladbrokes returned to casinos in September 1994, with a £50 million purchase of three clubs in London, which it stated was the first step in building an international casino business. The three casinos, Maxims, Chesters and the Golden Horseshoe, were bought from City Clubs; a fourth London casino, the Barracuda, was bought from Stakis in April 1996, and in August 1998 Ladbrokes completed the $87 million purchase of Colorado Gaming & Entertainment, the owner of three casinos in Black Hawk and Central City, Colorado, its first casinos in the United States. In February 1997 Ladbroke Racing bought the A.R. Dennis chain of 114 betting shops in London and south-east England for £31.3 million, which took its number of betting shops in the United Kingdom to 1,925.

Each of the two Hilton companies had expanded into the other's territory in the 1980s, and Hilton International sued Hilton Hotels Corporation in 1991. In August 1996, Ladbroke Group and Hilton Hotels Corporation announced an alliance to reunite the Hilton brand, which had been owned separately inside and outside the United States since 1964; Ladbroke's chief executive, Peter George, and Hilton's chief executive, Steve Bollenbach, were each to join the other company's board. The two companies' cooperation on sales, marketing and loyalty programmes began in early 1997. This alliance ultimately paved the way for the 2006 acquisition of Hilton International by Hilton Hotels Corporation.

In January 1998, Ladbrokes agreed to buy Coral, a chain of betting shops with 891 locations, from Bass plc for £375.5 million; other reports gave the price as £363 million. The deal was referred to the Monopolies and Mergers Commission in March 1998, and in September 1998 the UK Government ordered Ladbrokes to sell Coral after the commission found that the acquisition was anti-competitive. The commission, whose time to report was extended from 7 July to 31 July 1998 because of the number of submissions and hearings, concluded that the merger was against the public interest and recommended that Ladbroke be required to divest the whole of Coral's business in the United Kingdom within six months. In February 1999 Ladbrokes sold Coral's businesses in the United Kingdom to Morgan Grenfell Private Equity, a subsidiary of Deutsche Bank, for £390 million; it kept Coral's 50 betting shops in Ireland and eight in Jersey, which were rebranded as Ladbrokes. In March 1999, the company acquired Stakis Hotels for £1.3 billion, gaining 53 hotels and 22 casinos. The purchase also brought the 68-unit LivingWell chain of health clubs, and the Stakis hotels were subsequently rebranded as Hilton. Later that year, Ladbrokes renamed itself as Hilton Group plc, to reflect its increasing focus on the hotel business, which had come to represent over 80 per cent of the company's assets. In 2000, Peter George stepped down as group chief executive after 37 years with the company and was succeeded by David Michels, formerly chief executive of Stakis, who had run the group's hotel division since the takeover.

In August 1999, Hilton Group decided to dispose of its gambling operations outside of Europe due to disappointing results. At the same time the company said that it would expand its office in Gibraltar, opened seven years earlier to take large bets from overseas clients, into a major call centre; bets taken there carried a charge of 3 per cent, compared with the 9 per cent levied in Britain. Most of the assets, including racetracks and casinos in the United States and bingo and betting businesses in South America, were sold by 2001. In addition, the company sold its twenty-seven casinos in the United Kingdom to the Gala Group in December 2000 for £236 million.

In November 2000, Hilton Group and Hilton Hotels Corporation formed a joint venture to expand the Conrad luxury hotel brand, and Hilton Group sold 11 hotels in the United Kingdom to the Royal Bank of Scotland for £312 million, leasing them back so that it continued to run them. In June 2001 it completed the £620.2 million purchase of Scandic Hotels AB, which operated hotels across the Nordic region, after an offer announced in April 2001 of SEK 144 per share in cash and new Hilton Group shares. In 2001 Hilton International produced about 37 per cent of the group's revenue and more than 60 per cent of its profit, while profits of the betting and gaming division rose by 23 per cent and its online gambling business made a profit for the first time.

=== Ladbrokes plc and the Coral merger (2005–2018) ===
In December 2005, Hilton Group agreed to sell its hotel businesses to Hilton Hotels Corporation for approximately £3.3 billion in cash, and the sale was completed on 23 February 2006. The company once more rebranded itself as Ladbrokes plc. While the sale was being negotiated the company said that it had received a number of approaches from possible buyers of the Ladbrokes betting business, reported to be private-equity firms. Under the agreement the two companies were to share equally the cost of closing a £111 million deficit in Hilton Group's pension fund, and Chris Bell, the head of the betting division, became chief executive of Ladbrokes plc. On completion the company said that it would return £4.2 billion to shareholders. In March 2007, the Vernons brand was sold to Sportech.

Following the introduction of the Gambling Act 2005 in the United Kingdom and the subsequent relaxation of advertising laws for gambling companies in 2007, a television campaign by Ladbrokes that included a host of ex professional footballers was the first to result in complaints to the Advertising Standards Authority (ASA); the ASA eventually cleared the campaign. The company once again came under fire from the ASA in January 2009, due to complaints relating to an advertising campaign.

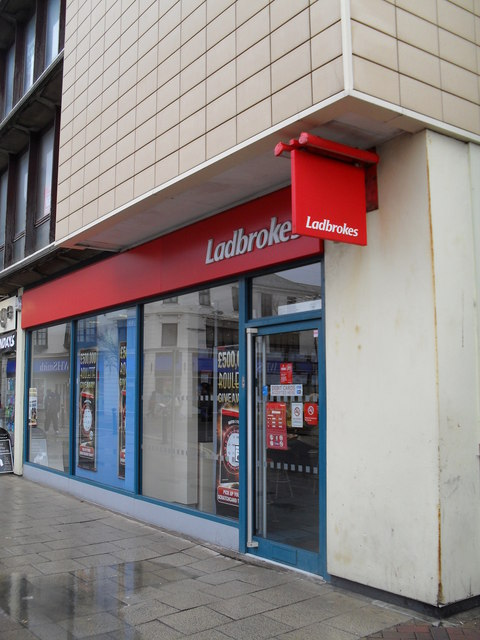
A Ladbrokes branch in Worthing (2010)

In October 2009 the company raised £275 million in a rights issue. In January 2010 it announced that Bell, who had joined Ladbrokes in 1991 and led the betting business since 2000, would step down that summer. Richard Glynn, a former non-executive chairman of the spread-betting firm Sporting Index, was appointed to succeed him, with a starting date of 22 April 2010. Glynn announced his departure in December 2014, after the profits of the company's digital business had fallen from £62.7 million in 2010 to £14 million in 2014, and in March 2015 Ladbrokes named as chief executive Jim Mullen, the head of its digital division, whom it had recruited from William Hill in November 2013.

Since 2007, Ladbrokes operated in Spain through the LBApuestas brand, but in April 2014 it terminated its licence for LBApuestas and created a website, Sportium, in a joint venture with the Spanish gaming and leisure operator Cirsa. The company entered the online betting market in Australia with its acquisition of Bookmaker.com.au for £13 million in September 2013, followed by a purchase of Betstar for £12 million in April 2014.

In June 2015, Ladbrokes announced that they were in talks with the board of Gala Coral Group over a possible merger. The combination of the two companies created Britain's biggest bookmaker, with over 4,000 betting shops and 30,000 employees.

In July 2016, the Competition and Markets Authority identified 642 areas where the merger would harm local competition, and said 350 to 400 shops would need to be sold off for the merger to be approved. The merger was completed on 2 November 2016. To effect the merger, Ladbrokes acquired the Coral Group and then changed its name from Ladbrokes plc to Ladbrokes Coral Group plc.

In 2017, Ladbrokes announced they were leaving their Rayners Lane HQ, home to around 1,000 employees. It was later confirmed they were moving to the new Coral HQ in Stratford, east London.

In December 2017, GVC Holdings agreed to buy Ladbrokes Coral in a deal that could be worth up to £4 billion.

In January 2018, Ladbrokes and the Scottish Professional Football League agreed to extend the betting company's sponsorship agreement until at 2020. The deal saw the bookmaker remain the principal sponsor of the top four divisions of Scottish football in a deal worth up to £5 million.

In March 2018, Ladbrokes completed their omnichannel integration strategy with software provider Playtech, offering single account functionality for all its online, mobile and retail products in the United Kingdom. Also in March 2018, GVC Holdings completed its acquisition with GVC shareholders owning 53.5% and Ladbrokes Coral 46.5% of the combined company.

In March 2019 GVC said that the reduction of the maximum stake on fixed odds betting terminals to £2, which took effect that April, would reduce its earnings for the year by £135 million and lead it to close about 1,000 betting shops.

== Regulatory sanctions and fines ==
In 2017, Ladbrokes ended its sponsorship of the Football Association after the FA chose to terminate agreements with all gambling companies, reflecting growing concerns about gambling's influence on sport.

In December 2018, Ladbrokes paid victims £1 million in compensation after it was disclosed that a problem gambler had been stealing funds from his business clients to fund his habit. The payments were made on the condition that the victims did not report the operator to the UK Gambling Commission, the regulatory body in charge of monitoring all gambling in the United Kingdom.

On 31 July 2019, the UK Gambling Commission announced that Ladbrokes Coral would pay £5.9m for past failings in anti-money laundering and social responsibility. An investigation found that the companies failed to put in place effective safeguards, to prevent consumers suffering gambling harm and against money laundering, between November 2014 and October 2017.

On 14 February 2020, the Liquor and Gaming New South Wales regulatory agency imposed a fine of AUD207,500 on Ladbrokes Australia and another GVC Holdings brand, Neds, for offering illegal gambling inducements to residents in New South Wales. The regulator called it "the biggest ever fine of its kind" in NSW.

On 21 December 2022, the Advertising Standards Authority ruled that an advertisement that Ladbrokes ran in October 2022, featuring Premier League footballers Philippe Coutinho, Jesse Lingard and Kalidou Koulibaly, was irresponsible and breached the UK Code of Non-broadcast Advertising and Direct & Promotional Marketing as it had a strong appeal to those under 18 years of age.

In 2025, the company faced criticism for running gambling advertisements through a parents' app linked to schools. Ladbrokes removed the ads and committed to more careful placement in the future.

== Sponsorship ==
In 2024, Ladbrokes became the official betting partner of Liverpool F.C.. The company also sponsors horse racing events, including the Ladbrokes Chester Cup, Christmas Hurdle at Ascot, and the Thirsk Hunt Cup.

Ladbrokes previously sponsored the Scottish Professional Football League (2015–2020), Sheffield United and Burnley (2016–2018), and the Rugby Football League Challenge Cup (2015–2018). It also supported darts competitions, such as the PDC World Darts Championship (2003–2014).
