= Stakis Hotels =

Stakis plc
- Type: Public
- Industry: Hotels; Casinos; Health clubs
- Founder: Reo Stakis
- Defunct: 1999
- Fate: Acquired by Ladbroke Group (renamed Hilton Group in 1999); hotels rebranded as Hilton
- Successor: Hilton Group
- Headquarters: Glasgow, Scotland
- Number of locations: 53 hotels, 22 casinos and 67 health clubs (1999)
- Key people: Reo Stakis (founder); David Michels (chief executive)

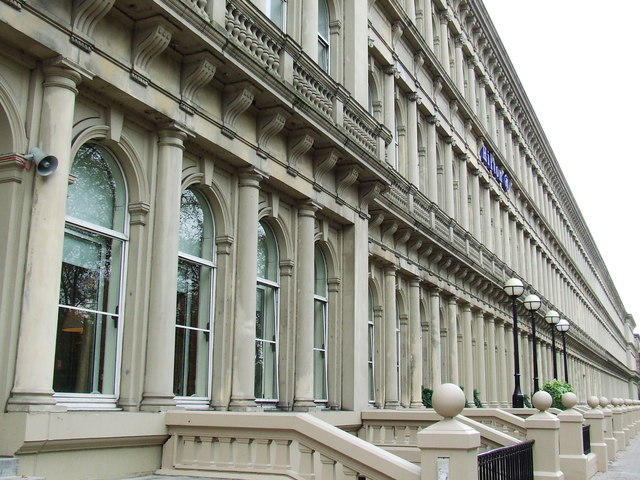
The Grosvenor Hotel, a former Stakis property in Glasgow, now owned by Hilton Worldwide.

Stakis Hotels was a hotel chain in the United Kingdom led by Sir Reo Stakis, headquartered in Glasgow. It was part of Stakis plc, a Glasgow-based group that also owned casinos and LivingWell health clubs, and in 1999 the group was sold to Ladbroke Group, after which the hotels were rebranded under the Hilton name.

== History ==
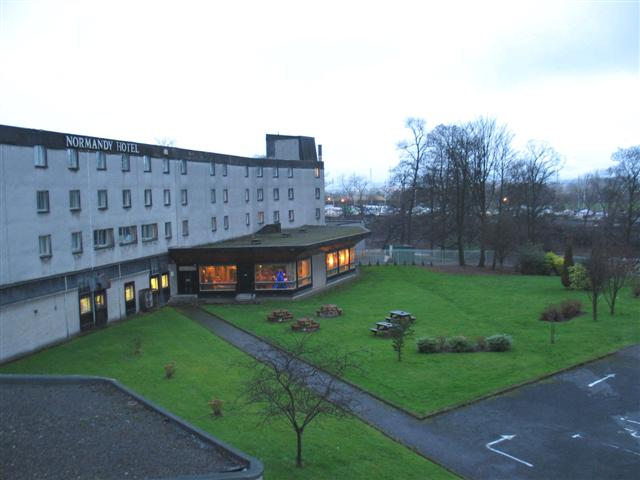
The Normandy Hotel, Renfrew, which opened in 1973 as the Stakis Normandy Hotel

=== Origins and expansion ===
Reo Stakis left Cyprus for Britain in 1928, aged 14, and settled in Glasgow in the 1930s. During the Second World War he rented a restaurant in Hope Street and a few years later bought the block in which it stood, which became the foundation of his business; he went on to create a chain of restaurants and then moved into hotels and casinos. The company, which stayed based in Glasgow but gradually expanded southwards, joined the stock exchange in 1972, when it was valued at £7 million. Reo Stakis was knighted in 1988.

After expanding in London and the south-east in the 1980s, the group faced a financial crisis in 1991, in the early-1990s recession. Reo Stakis's son Andros, under whom the expansion had taken place, was removed, Reo became president, and David Michels, recruited from Ladbroke, was brought in to lead the recovery; the company's value had been estimated at £70 million during the crisis.

=== Sale to Ladbroke ===
It was sold to Ladbroke in March 1999 for £1.2 billion, and the combined company renamed Hilton Group. The Stakis family's stake was worth £78 million, and some shareholders complained at another Scottish company being sold to an English buyer. The takeover was announced in February 1999 by Ladbroke's chief executive, Peter George, who described Stakis as the group's "number one target" in Britain. Ladbroke's agreed offer valued Stakis at £1.16 billion, at 57.7 pence in cash plus 0.382355 new Ladbroke shares for each Stakis share. The deal brought together Ladbroke's 38 Hilton hotels in Britain with 53 Stakis hotels, and its five London casinos with 22 Stakis casinos, which were largely provincial. Stakis's chief executive, David Michels, was to become chief executive of Ladbroke's Hilton International division and join its executive board, while 200 jobs at the Glasgow headquarters were put under review because the combined group was to be based at Ladbroke's head office in Watford. Following the sale, many of the Stakis top personnel were retained by Hilton and took some of the senior positions within the company including Sir David Michels the then CEO of Stakis, who went on to become Chief Executive of Hilton Group.
