= Hotel Normandie (San Francisco) =

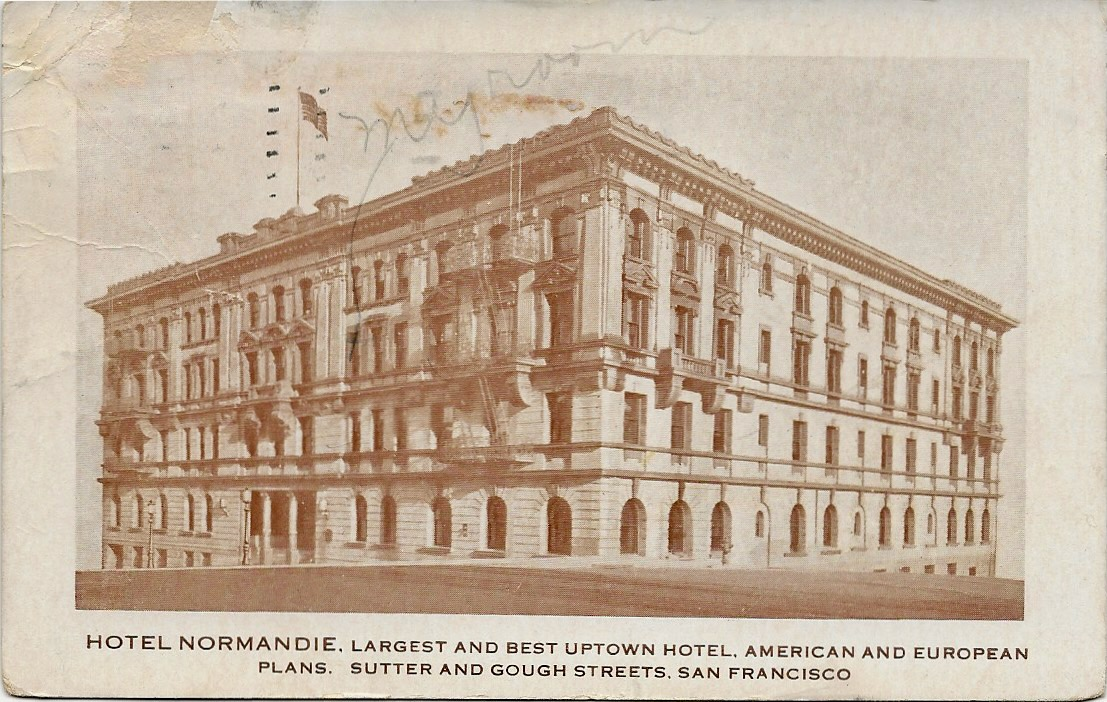
- Postcard view of the Hotel Normandie, San Francisco

- Location within San Francisco County

General information
- Location: 1499 Sutter Street; San Francisco, California
- Coordinates: 37°47′13″N 122°25′28″W
- Opening: 1908

Technical details
- Floor count: Main: 4

Other information
- Number of rooms: 250

Website
- broadmoorsf.com

The Hotel Normandie, was a historic hotel, once situated in what is currently known as Japantown, San Francisco, held significant historical value. It occupied the southeastern intersection of Sutter and Gough Streets from 1908 onwards. Originally a four-story masonry structure, the hotel underwent renovations in the twentieth century, resulting in the removal of its classical ornamentation in favor of a more modernized appearance. As of today, the Hotel Normandie has undergone a name change and is now known as the Hotel Broadmoor.

== History ==
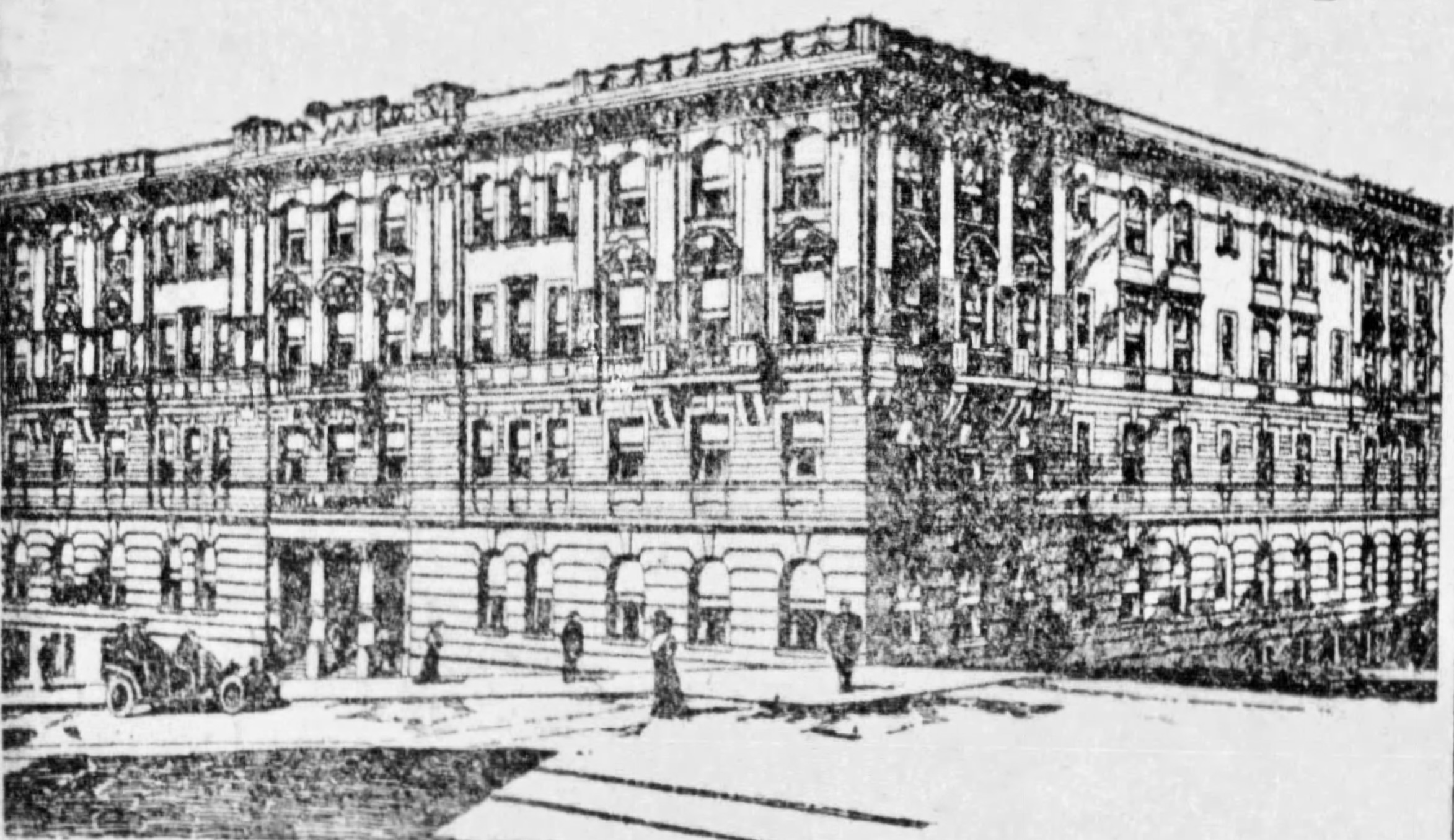
Hotel Normandie Illustration (1908)

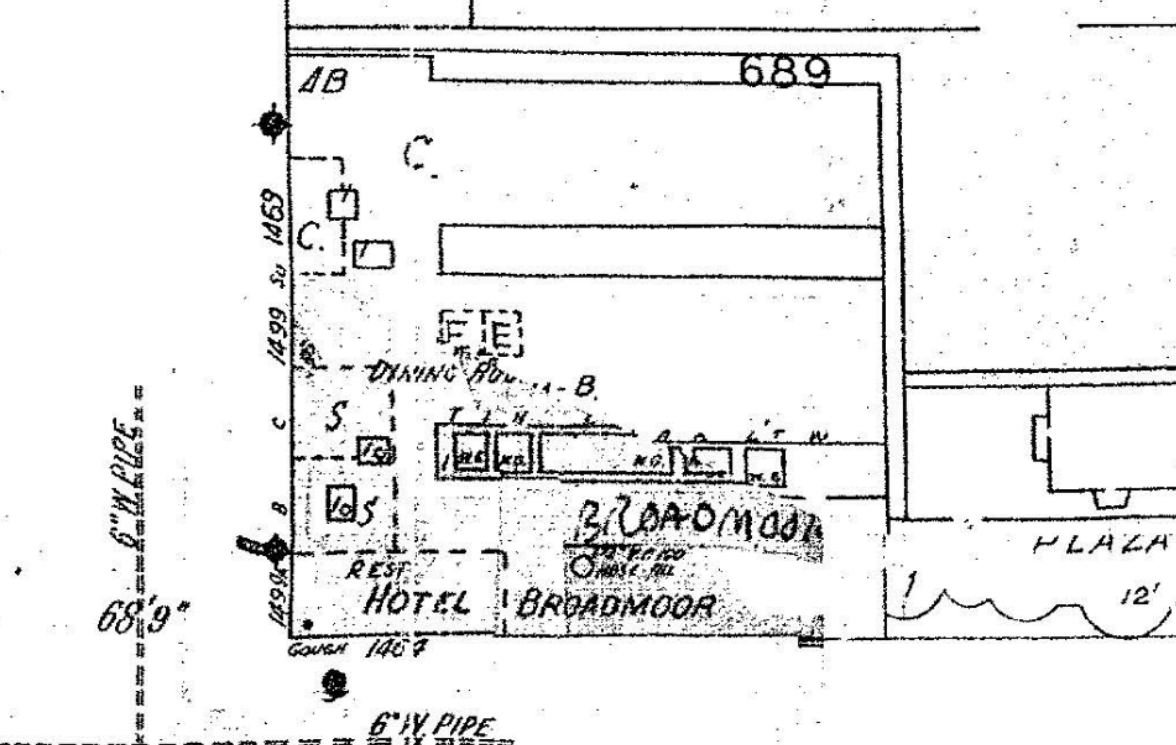
Site map of the Hotel Broadmoor, San Francisco

The Hotel Normandie was completed before the 1906 San Francisco Fire. The four-story establishment opened in April 1908, featuring a collection of 250 guest rooms and suites. The distinctive layout of the Hotel Normandie formed an "E" shape, featuring two slender and luminous courtyards that allowed natural light and fresh air to permeate the interior rooms. The exterior of the hotel showcased an appealing design crafted with terracotta brick, while the lobby showcased the interior with the use of marble. Within the rooms of the Hotel Normandie, guests were treated to a tasteful ambiance created by carefully chosen furnishings. Adorned with wallpaper and carpets, the rooms boasted a collection of mahogany, oak, and walnut furniture. The dining room of the Hotel was characterized by its ample space, abundant lighting, and excellent ventilation, ensuring a pleasant dining experience for guests. The well-equipped kitchen boasted a comprehensive range of modern appliances, catering to the culinary needs of the hotel's patrons. Under the management of Max Schulhofer and Leo Lebenbaum, the hotel prioritized the comfort and convenience of traveling individuals, making special arrangements to cater to their specific requirements.

Nestled near the Pacific Heights district, the hotel was designed in the elegant Palazzo style, adding to its allure and architectural splendor.

By November 1936, the former Hotel Normandie underwent a transformation and began operating under a new name, the Hotel Broadmoor. As of 2019, the hotel comprised 198 rooms and 132 bathrooms, as recorded by the San Francisco Office of the Assessor. Occupying a spacious lot measuring approximately 18,905 square feet (1,756.3 m^{2}), the hotel stood as a prominent presence. However, by 2019, a significant portion of the Neo-classical exterior ornamentation had been removed from the Hotel Normandie.

Hotel Broadmoor transitioned into a retirement hotel in the 1990s, catering to the needs and comforts of retirees.
