= Laxå =

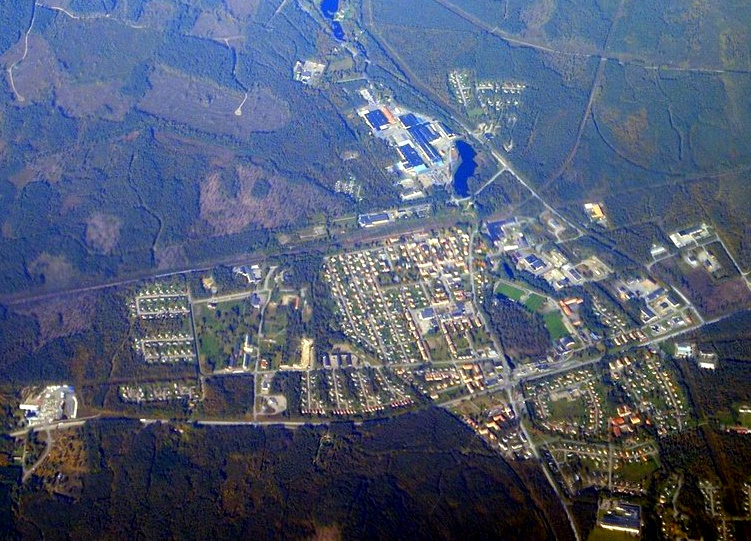
- September 2008 aerial view of Laxå.

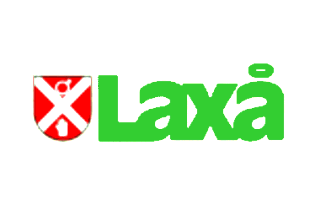
- Flag

- Location within Örebro Location within Sweden
- Coordinates: 58°59′N 14°37′E
- Country: Sweden
- Province: Närke
- County: Örebro County
- Municipality: Laxå Municipality

Area
  - Total: 4.54 km^{2} (1.75 sq mi)

Population (31 December 2010)
  - Total: 3,064
  - Density: 676/km^{2} (1,750/sq mi)
- Time zone: UTC+1 (CET)
  - Summer (DST): UTC+2 (CEST)

Laxå is a locality and the seat of Laxå Municipality in Örebro County, Sweden with 3,064 inhabitants in 2010.

== History ==
The town was founded in the mid-19th century when the main line railway between Gothenburg and Stockholm (Västra Stambanan) was built in 1883. Laxå is exactly 229 km (142 mi) from both those cities.

In the vicinity of the town Laxå lies the Porla Well. Its iron rich water made it a popular spa between 1724 until 1939. Although not a spa anymore, its water is sold in bottles with the brand "Porlavatten" and have been distributed nationwide since the 1920s.

On August 17, 2012, it was reported in Dagens Nyheter that Laxå is Sweden's poorest municipality and the only one in the country with a net debt which has made the town go through serious struggles in both education provision and healthcare.

Tived's school, Kanal school and Saltäng's school were all closed in a short space of time with two more on the brink of closing.
