= Online gambling in Mexico =

Overview of online gambling in Mexico

Online gambling in Mexico covers sports betting and casino games offered to players in Mexico over the internet and through mobile apps. There is no law written specifically for it; betting sites run under federal permits that the Secretariat of the Interior (SEGOB) issues for land-based gaming, based on a 1947 law and a 2004 regulation. Caliente of Tijuana has led the market since the 2010s, with Codere, BetMexico, Bet365 and Playdoit after it; an estimated 145 brands were active in early 2026. Since January 1, 2026, betting has been taxed at 50 percent, up from 30. In November 2025 the government shut down the Mexican sites of Bet365 and Betano, both run by TV Azteca, over suspected money laundering, and the case was still in the courts in mid-2026.

== Legal framework ==
Gambling is a federal matter in Mexico. The governing law is the Ley Federal de Juegos y Sorteos (Federal Law of Games and Draws) of December 31, 1947, which has 17 articles, bans games of chance in general and lets SEGOB authorize specific kinds of betting. It never mentions the internet. Permits are issued by SEGOB's Dirección General de Juegos y Sorteos (DGJS).

The law had no regulation (reglamento) until September 17, 2004, under President Vicente Fox. It was amended in 2012, 2013 and 2023. The regulation created remote betting centers (centros de apuestas remotas or libros foráneos), i.e. sports books that take bets on events in Mexico or abroad. Article 85 lets these establishments take bets by internet, telephone or other electronic means, as long as SEGOB first approves the system and each bet is recorded with the bettor's identity; this article is the legal basis for online betting in Mexico. Only three articles of the regulation deal with electronic betting at all.

The Chamber of Deputies challenged the regulation before the Supreme Court in November 2004, arguing that Fox had gone beyond the 1947 law. In January 2007 the court upheld the articles on remote betting centers 8–2 and struck down only one phrase, on instant lotteries. In the meantime, Interior Secretary Santiago Creel had authorized 432 betting centers and raffle halls, each for 25 years, days before leaving office; one permit to Televisa alone covered 170 centers. Most online operators still work under these and later land-based permits, usually in partnership with the permit holder.

Under the regulation, advertising may not openly promote betting, must show the permit number and must say that minors are not allowed.

The decree of November 16, 2023 banned slot machines in every form, limited each permit to one establishment, removed the "operator" role (letting a third party run a permit holder's business) and cut the maximum term of new betting center permits from 25 to 15 years. It had no rules specific to online gaming. By January 2024 about 37 casino companies had filed amparos against it, and most won suspensions. Three federal judges later found the reform unconstitutional, in cases brought by Grupo Caliente, Operadora de Coincidencias Numéricas and Zitro. A Supreme Court draft upholding the reform was never voted on, because the company in that case (Sabia Corporation) withdrew on August 27, 2026.

There is no complete public list of licensed sites. In September 2025 there were an estimated 30 to 35 licensed operators on ".mx" domains and another 50 to 60 on international domains. The federal audit office (ASF) counted 51 casino-type permits, held by 36 permit holders, in 2023. In May 2026 Deputy Rubén Moreira asked SEGOB to publish every permit and authorized website.

== Taxation ==
Gambling pays the federal special tax on production and services (IEPS). In September 2025 the Finance Secretariat proposed raising it from 30 to 50 percent as part of the 2026 budget package, expecting more than 5 billion pesos in revenue in 2026. The Chamber of Deputies passed it 351–129 in October 2025, and the Senate passed it in the early hours of October 29.

The decree, published in the Diario Oficial on November 7, 2025, took effect on January 1, 2026. It sets the 50 percent rate for all betting and draws and spells out that it also applies to bets placed over the internet with operators based abroad. A bet counts as made in Mexico whenever the player is in Mexico. Digital platforms must withhold the full tax and pay it monthly, and those that do not comply can have their service temporarily blocked. Under the 2026 tax rules the tax service (SAT) also gets real-time access to casino and betting transactions. The industry association AIEJA called the rise a "deep disappointment", saying that "the higher the tax, the lower the revenue". Codere's finance chief expected it to have a "chilling effect" on new operators.

States add their own taxes; Mexico City, for example, charges 6 percent on prizes.

== Market ==
Estimates of the market's size vary widely. Market research firm Mordor Intelligence put the online market at about US$0.8 billion in 2025, with sports betting about 56 percent of it. Deputy Ricardo Mejía Berdeja, citing industry figures, said the legal online market grew from about US$600 million in 2019 to about US$2.7 billion in 2024. Analytics firm Blask, which measures brand search demand, estimated the market's revenue at US$526 million in the first quarter of 2026 alone, up 24 percent on a year earlier.

The size of the illegal market is also disputed. The industry association AIEJA says more than 60 percent of betting sites are illegal, with about 1,000 unlicensed platforms appearing between 2020 and 2024 against some 80 legal ones. Blask's data, by contrast, gives offshore brands only 8.8 percent of search demand and 7.2 percent of revenue in early 2026, though growing.

In a 2023 YouGov survey, 27.4 percent of Mexicans said they bet at least once a week. The 2026 FIFA World Cup, co-hosted by Mexico, brought a surge in betting. AIEJA said demand rose 30 to 40 percent at peaks, in-play betting rose 60 to 150 percent, and operators nearly doubled their customer base. Payment processor STP saw its own volume for betting sites rise 432 percent over the 2022 World Cup.

The leading brands by search demand in the first quarter of 2026 were:

Rank	Brand	Est. revenue, Q1 2026 (US$ millions)	Demand change on Q1 2025
1	Caliente	239.8	+18.8%
2	BetMexico	21.4	+52.6%
3	Codere	36.6	+28.6%
4	Bet365	33.4	−0.9%
5	Playdoit	24.1	+37.0%
6	AFun	6.6	+547.7%
7	Betmaster	8.3	+104.0%
8	RushBet	9.1	+58.5%
9	Brazino777	7.1	+168.3%
10	Novibet	12.7	+98.8%

== Operators ==
=== Caliente ===
Caliente, run by the Hank family of Tijuana, is the oldest and largest gaming company in Mexico. In March 2012 it signed a software deal with British supplier Playtech, which financed the online project in return for a share of profits; caliente.mx launched around 2014. The site is run by Tecnología en Entretenimiento Caliplay under SEGOB permit DGG/SP/404/97. In 2019 the company said it had about 4 million registered users and half of a legal online market worth about US$400 million; online already brought in 45 percent of the group's betting revenue. Forbes México put its share at 51 percent in 2021, and Blask estimated it took 45.6 percent of the market's revenue in early 2026.

Caliplay and Playtech fell out in 2023 over Playtech's service fees, with lawsuits in both Mexico and England. They settled in September 2024: Playtech recovered more than €150 million in unpaid fees, kept a 30.8 percent stake in the new holding company, Caliente Interactive, and stayed lead supplier until 2032. A plan to list Caliplay in the United States had been dropped in 2022.

Caliente has been the official betting partner of Liga MX since 2020, and in 2023 it signed a four-year sponsorship of the national team; at that time it also sponsored 18 clubs. The group also owns Club Tijuana, whose home ground is Estadio Caliente.

=== Codere ===
Spanish gaming group Codere has worked in Mexico since the 1990s and was long a partner of Caliente. It launched codere.mx in 2017. The site runs under a 1997 permit held by Libros Foráneos, which covers telephone and internet betting and is valid until May 2027; online betting on it was authorized from January 2019. Codere Online, listed on the Nasdaq since late 2021, has two main markets, Spain and Mexico, and Mexico has been the larger since 2023. Its Mexican net gaming revenue was €81.7 million in 2023, €106.6 million in 2024 and €119.1 million in 2025, when it averaged close to 100,000 active players a month by the end of the year. In the second quarter of 2026 Mexican revenue was €36.1 million, up 24 percent, helped by the World Cup.

Codere has been the shirt sponsor of C.F. Monterrey (Rayados) since 2021, renewed in 2024, and of its women's team since 2025. Monterrey is its best market, and in 2026 it launched a betting TV show with Grupo Multimedios.

=== Bet365 and Betano ===
In September 2018, near the end of the Peña Nieto government, TV Azteca's subsidiary Ganador Azteca got a 25-year permit for a casino in Yanga, Veracruz, which also allowed betting by internet and telephone. The permit was changed so a third party could run the online side, and in November 2018 the DGJS approved Bet365, the British bookmaker, as that partner; bet365.mx was fully live by June 2019. Greek-owned Betano followed in 2024 through a second subsidiary, Operadora Ganador TV Azteca, under the same permit. Bet365 was the fourth-biggest brand in Mexico in early 2026, even though it was offline for most of the quarter. Both sites were shut down in November 2025 (see Enforcement).

=== PlayCity ===
PlayCity is the casino chain of Televisa, moved in 2024 to the spin-off company Ollamani along with the Estadio Azteca. Its online casino and sports book are run by the subsidiary Apuestas Internacionales. Online active accounts grew 35 percent in 2025, and gaming was Ollamani's most profitable business, with 632 million pesos in operating profit.

=== RushBet ===
RushBet is the Latin American brand of Chicago-based Rush Street Interactive. It launched in Mexico on June 30, 2022 under a 25-year exclusive deal with Grupo Multimedios of Monterrey, whose subsidiary holds the permit. By late 2025 the company had more than 493,000 monthly users across Latin America, Mexico included.

=== Novibet ===
Greek operator Novibet entered Mexico in November 2022, in time for the Qatar World Cup, through a revenue-sharing deal with the casino chain Big Bola; it was the company's first market outside Europe. Its ambassador is Chilean footballer Arturo Vidal, and since 2025 it has been on the front of the Cruz Azul shirt. Blask estimated its demand nearly doubled between early 2025 and early 2026.

=== Strendus ===
Strendus is the online brand of Logrand Entertainment Group, which ran about 14 casinos. It started as a trial in January 2018 and had more than 200,000 registered players by 2019. It has sponsored the LNBP basketball league and, from 2021, Spain's La Liga in Mexico.

=== Other operators ===
BetMexico was started in February 2021 by businessmen from Jalisco and grew to second place by search demand in early 2026, though with far lower revenue than Codere or Bet365. Playdoit, which calls itself a "100% Mexican operator", has sponsored Necaxa. Winpot, a Toluca-based casino operator tied to the Cyprus supplier Wiztech, went online in October 2022. Big Bola, with about 20 casinos, opened its own site in 2017 and brought in Swedish operator Betsson, which launched betsson.mx in September 2022. Stake launched stake.mx in May 2026, before the World Cup, through a local permit holder. Among the fastest-growing brands of 2025–26 were AFun, Betmaster, whose ambassador is UFC fighter Brandon Moreno, and Brazil's Brazino777; Blask counts AFun and Brazino777 as "offshore-adjacent".

== Enforcement ==
On November 11, 2025 the Financial Intelligence Unit (UIF) put 13 casinos, in eight states and Mexico City, on its list of blocked companies over suspected money laundering, with money sent to the United States, Romania, Albania, Malta and Panama. SEGOB suspended them the same day, both their venues and their websites. The government did not name them, but Grupo Salinas confirmed that two were Ganador Azteca and Operadora Ganador TV Azteca, which run Bet365.mx and Betano.mx. Ten of the others were reportedly tied to the Albanian Hysa family, under investigation in the United States. President Claudia Sheinbaum denied any political motive. The suspension came a day before the Supreme Court threw out Grupo Salinas's last appeals in a 51-billion-peso tax case, which it settled with the SAT in January 2026.

What followed was a long court fight. In late November 2025 a judge ordered the domains restored, but on December 4 an appeals court allowed the sites to show information only, with no betting. A second suspension, granted on January 20, 2026, was revoked by another appeals court about a week later. In March 2026 Judge Germán Cruz Silva granted Ganador Azteca an amparo on the merits, finding that the DGJS had shut it down without a hearing; the DGJS had admitted that the company was picked "at random" from a risk list. He gave SEGOB three days to let it reopen. The government appealed, and in June 2026 the appeal was still pending and Bet365 still offline, missing the World Cup.

In August 2026 the DGJS suspended ten more online casino domains, run under permits of Ganador Azteca, Espectáculos Deportivos de Occidente, Comercializadora de Entretenimiento de Chihuahua, Juegos y Sorteos de Jalisco and Operadora de Coincidencias Numéricas. In October 2026 SEGOB said about 20 more casinos were under investigation.

== Reform proposals ==
At least 14 bills to replace the 1947 law have been put forward since 1997. One, creating a national gaming institute, passed the Chamber of Deputies in December 2014 but died in the Senate. In October 2025 Deputy Ricardo Mejía Berdeja of the Labor Party introduced a new Ley Federal de Juegos con Apuesta y Sorteos. It would replace the DGJS with a National Institute of Games and Draws, raise the betting age to 21, require online operators to use ".com.mx" domains, and let the authorities block illegal sites and their payments.

Sheinbaum said in October 2025 that SEGOB would draft its own reform, adding "we do not want to make betting illegal". As of October 2026 the draft had gone to the security cabinet, with no date set for sending it to Congress. In August 2026 a Mexico City legislator proposed banning betting ads around sports broadcasts and ending welcome bonuses, citing up to 3.9 million people with gambling problems.

== See also ==
- Gambling in Mexico
- Grupo Caliente
- PlayCity Casino
