= Baojun Yep =

Battery electric crossover city car

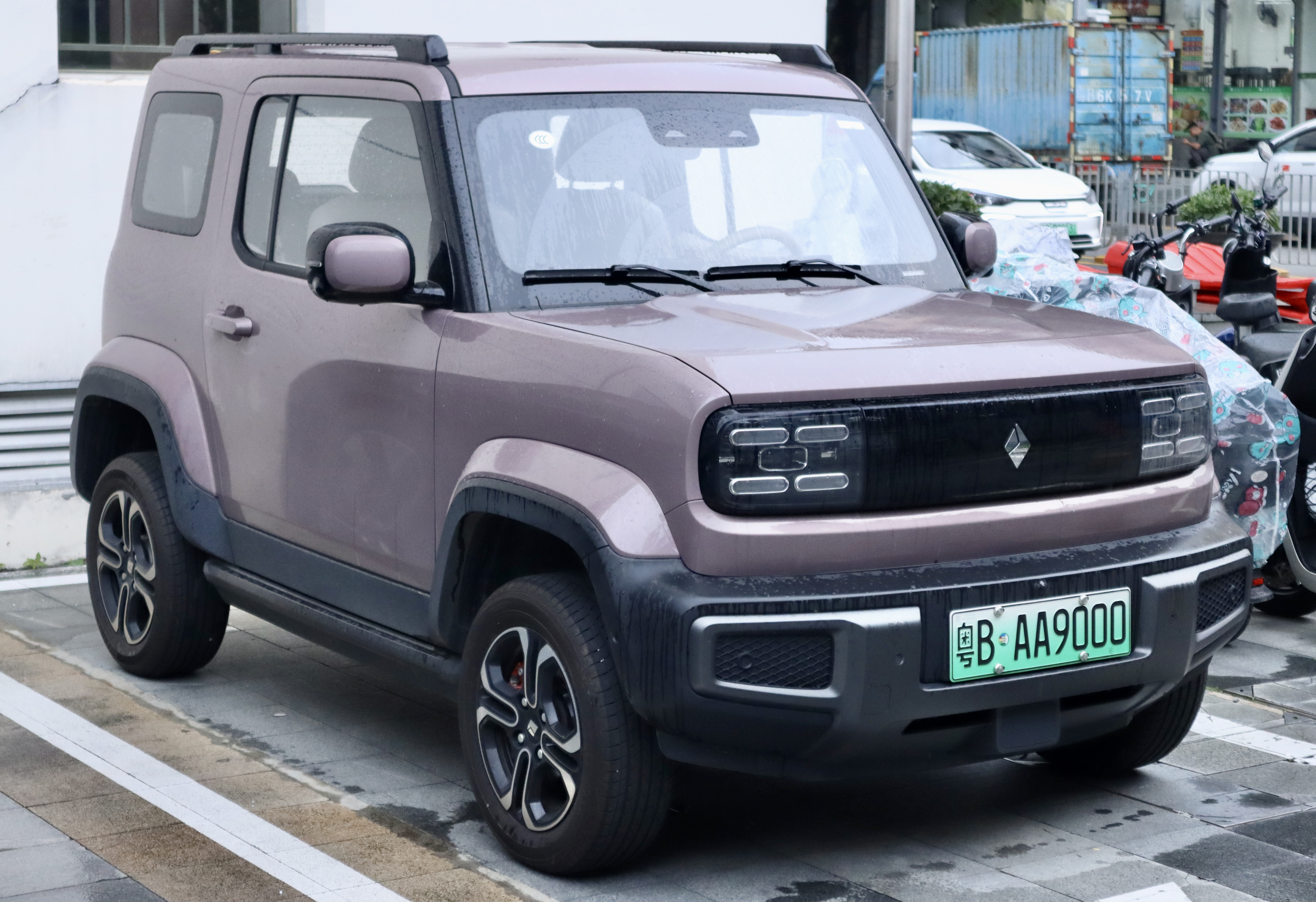

Overview
- Manufacturer: SAIC-GM-Wuling
- Model code: E260S
- Production: 2023–present
- Assembly: China: Liuzhou, Guangxi

Body and chassis
- Class: Crossover city car (A)
- Body style: 3-door SUV
- Layout: Rear-motor, rear-wheel-drive
- Platform: Tianyu S Architecture
- Related: Wuling Binguo; Wuling Binguo Plus

Powertrain
- Electric motor: Permanent magnet synchronous motor
- Power output: 50 kW (67 hp; 68 PS)
- Battery: 28.1 kWh LFP
- Electric range: 303 km (188.3 mi) (CLTC)

Dimensions
- Wheelbase: 2,110 mm (83.1 in)
- Length: 3,381 mm (133.1 in)
- Width: 1,685 mm (66.3 in)
- Height: 1,721 mm (67.8 in)
- Curb weight: 1,006 kg (2,218 lb)

The Baojun Yep (Chinese: 宝骏悦也; pinyin: Bǎojùn Yuèyě) is a battery electric crossover city car manufactured by SAIC-GM-Wuling (SGMW) since 2023 under the Baojun brand. The "悦也" literally translates as "joy also" or "happy together", but is also the homophone of "越野" which means "offroad".

== History ==
In February 2023, the Chinese joint-venture SAIC-GM-Wuling was introduced a new small city car in the form of a combination of a three-door hatchback with features reminiscent of large off-road vehicles such as the Suzuki Jimny. The result was the Baojun Yep crossover.

The Yep is distinguished by its angular silhouette with clearly defined wheel arches, black bumpers, and sill covers, as well as an imitation spare wheel on the trunk lid. The vehicle also uses full LED lighting, with a characteristic arrangement of stripes on the front covers. In addition, despite its small external dimensions, the Yep is a four-seater car that can accommodate two passengers in each row of seats, which has been achieved with a length of less than 3.4 m (11 ft).

The Yep is the first crossover SUV with a 300 mm (12 in) by 256 mm (10.1 in) LCD screen on the rear exterior. The shape is similar to a wristwatch and is used to display messages, emojis, pictures or animations to other drivers on the road.

The Yep was created for the dynamically developing electric car market in China in mind, with the start of sales scheduled for May 2023, just after the official presentation to the public at the 2023 Shanghai Auto Show.

A 2-door pickup truck version with four-wheel drive (4WD) is in development.

The Yep is powered by an electric motor located at the rear axle, which develops 67 hp and 140 Nm of maximum torque. It allows the driver to accelerate up to a top speed of 100 km/h (62 mph). The iron-phosphate battery allows the user to drive about 303 kilometers on a single charge in urban conditions according to the CLTC measurement cycle.

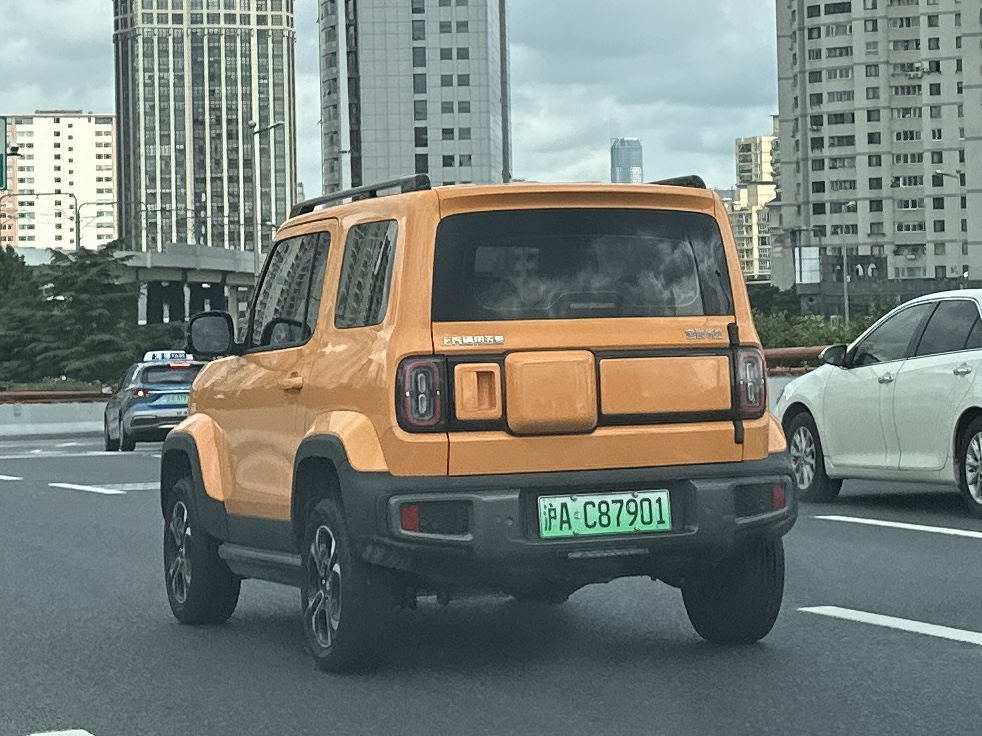
Rear view

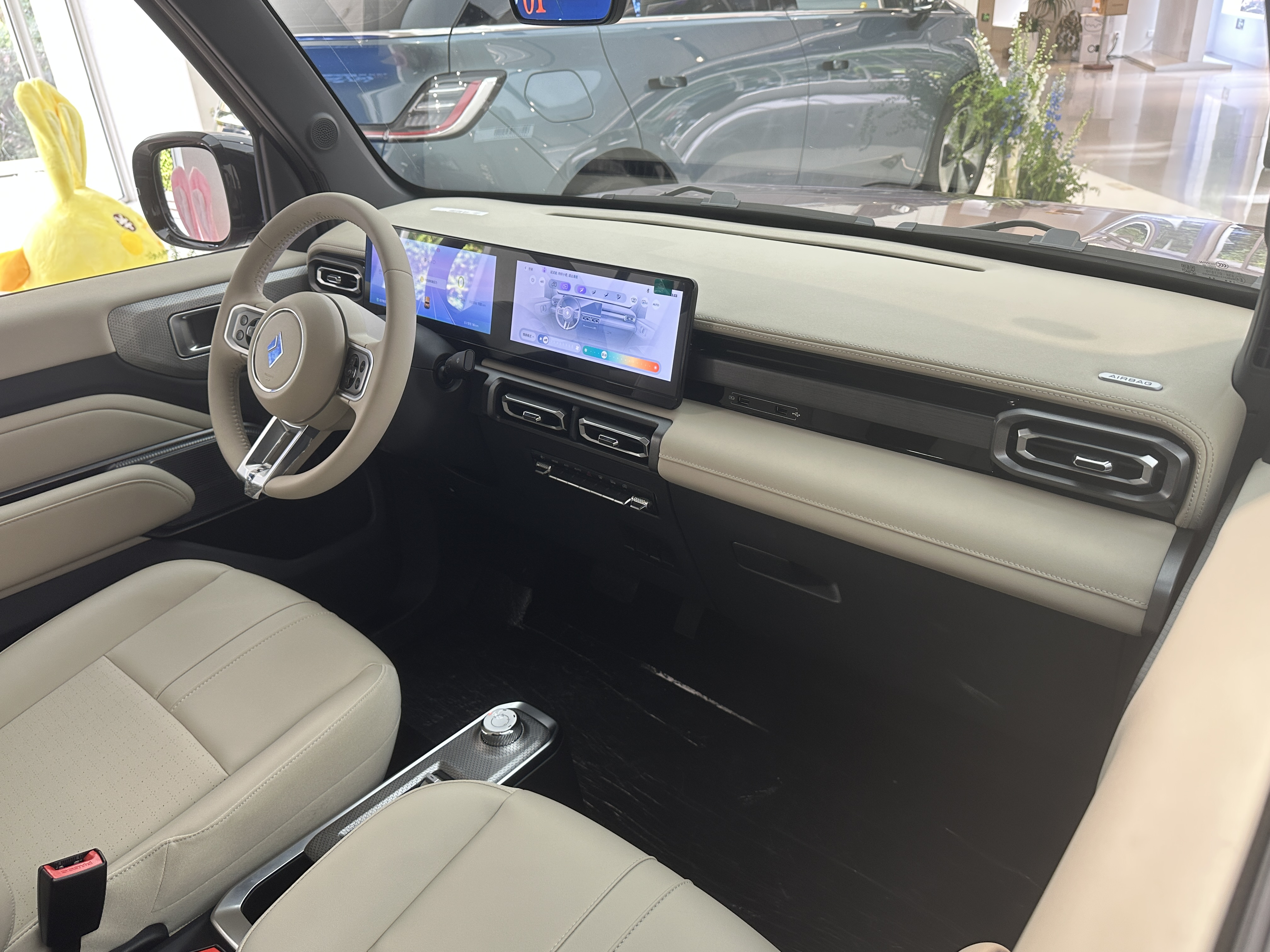
Interior

== Baojun Yep Plus ==
Baojun Yep Plus
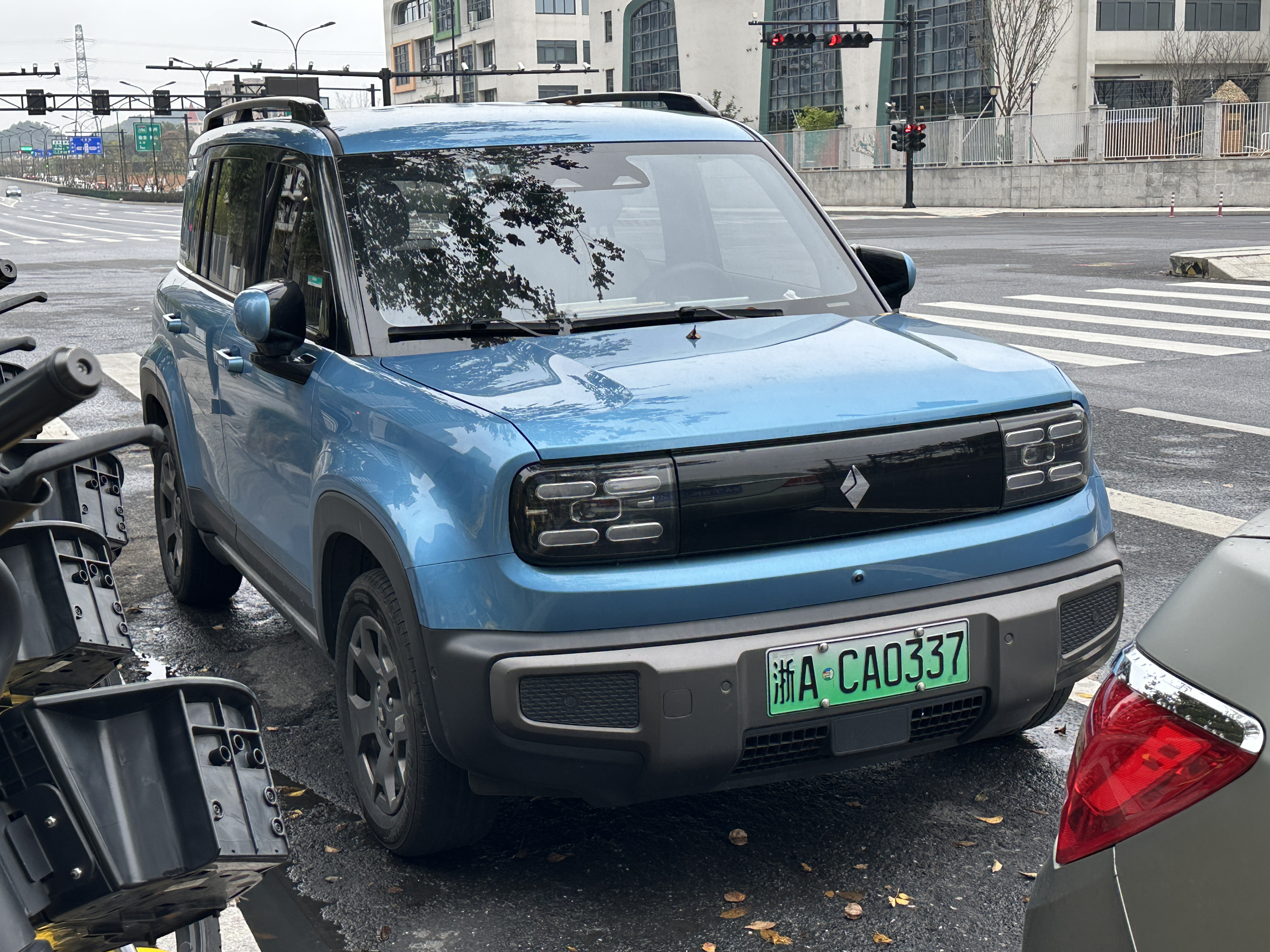

Overview
- Also called: Chevrolet Spark EUV
- Production: 2024–present
- Assembly: China: Liuzhou, Guangxi; Brazil: Horizonte, Ceará (General Motors do Brasil)

Body and chassis
- Class: Subcompact crossover SUV (B)
- Body style: 5-door SUV
- Layout: Rear-motor, rear-wheel-drive
- Platform: Tianyu M Architecture
- Related: Wuling Binguo S; Wuling Binguo Plus

Powertrain
- Electric motor: Permanent magnet synchronous motor
- Power output: 75 kW (101 hp; 102 PS)
- Battery: 32 kWh LFP Gotion; 41.9 kWh LFP Gotion; 54 kWh LFP Gotion
- Electric range: 301–501 km (187–311 mi) (CLTC)
- Plug-in charging: DC & AC; 3.3 kW V2L

Dimensions
- Wheelbase: 2,560 mm (100.8 in)
- Length: 3,996 mm (157.3 in)
- Width: 1,760 mm (69.3 in)
- Height: 1,726 mm (68.0 in)
- Curb weight: 1,325 kg (2,921 lb)

The 5-door Yep was revealed on 15 January 2024 as the Yep Plus. It went on sale in China in April 2024.

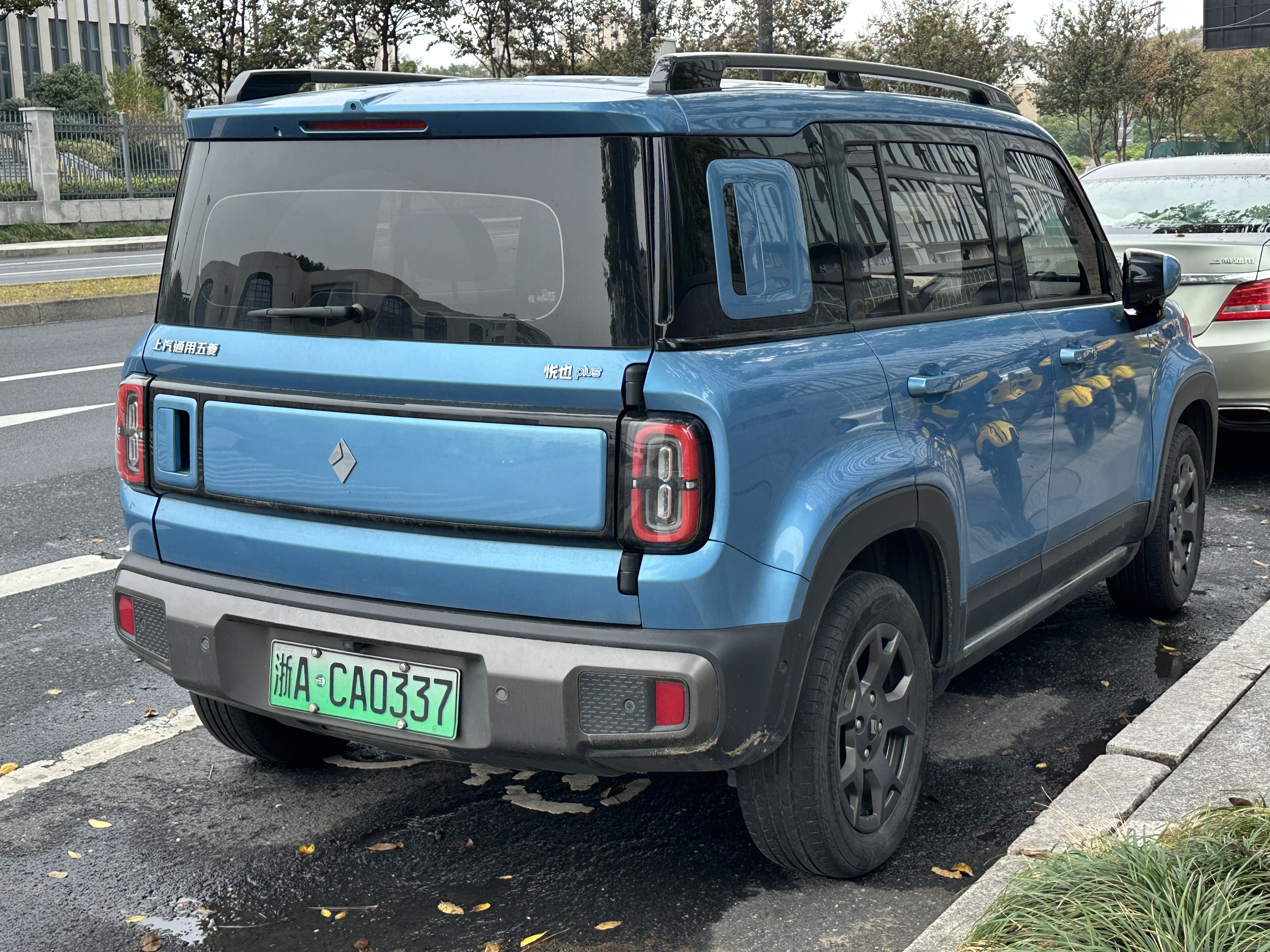
Rear view

=== Chevrolet Spark EUV ===
The Yep Plus is exported to Brazil as the Chevrolet Spark EUV under General Motors do Brasil, and from there to other South American countries, including Argentina, Chile, Uruguay, Paraguay, and Colombia. It has also been exported to the Middle East and Mexico since February 2025. Assembly in Brazil, with knock-down kits imported from China, started on 3 December 2025 at the PACE (Planta Automotiva do Ceará) plant in Horizonte, Ceará. In February 2026, the Spark EUV entered the ASEAN market with its launch in the Philippines, marking the model’s regional debut.

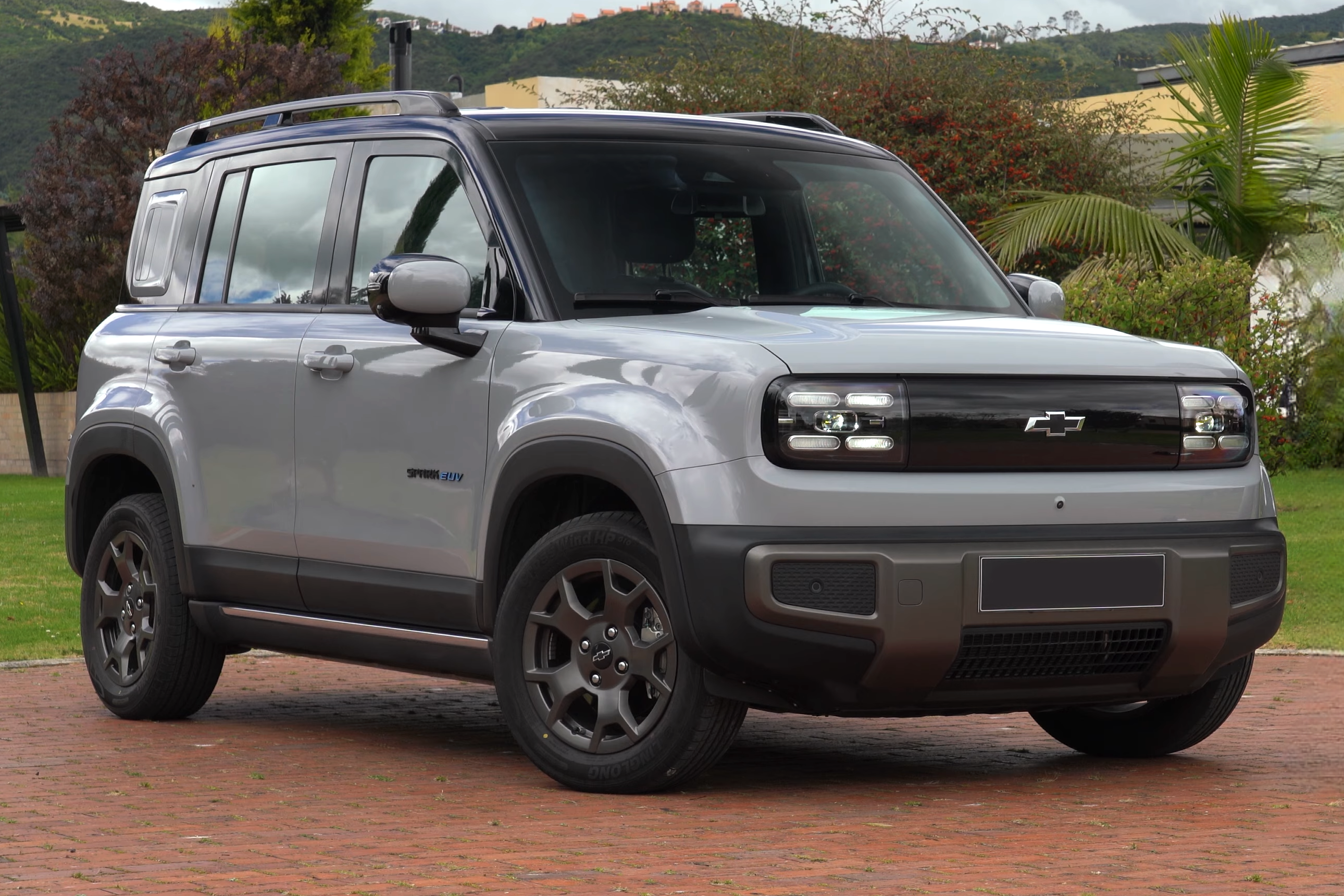
2025 Chevrolet Spark EUV Activ (Colombia)

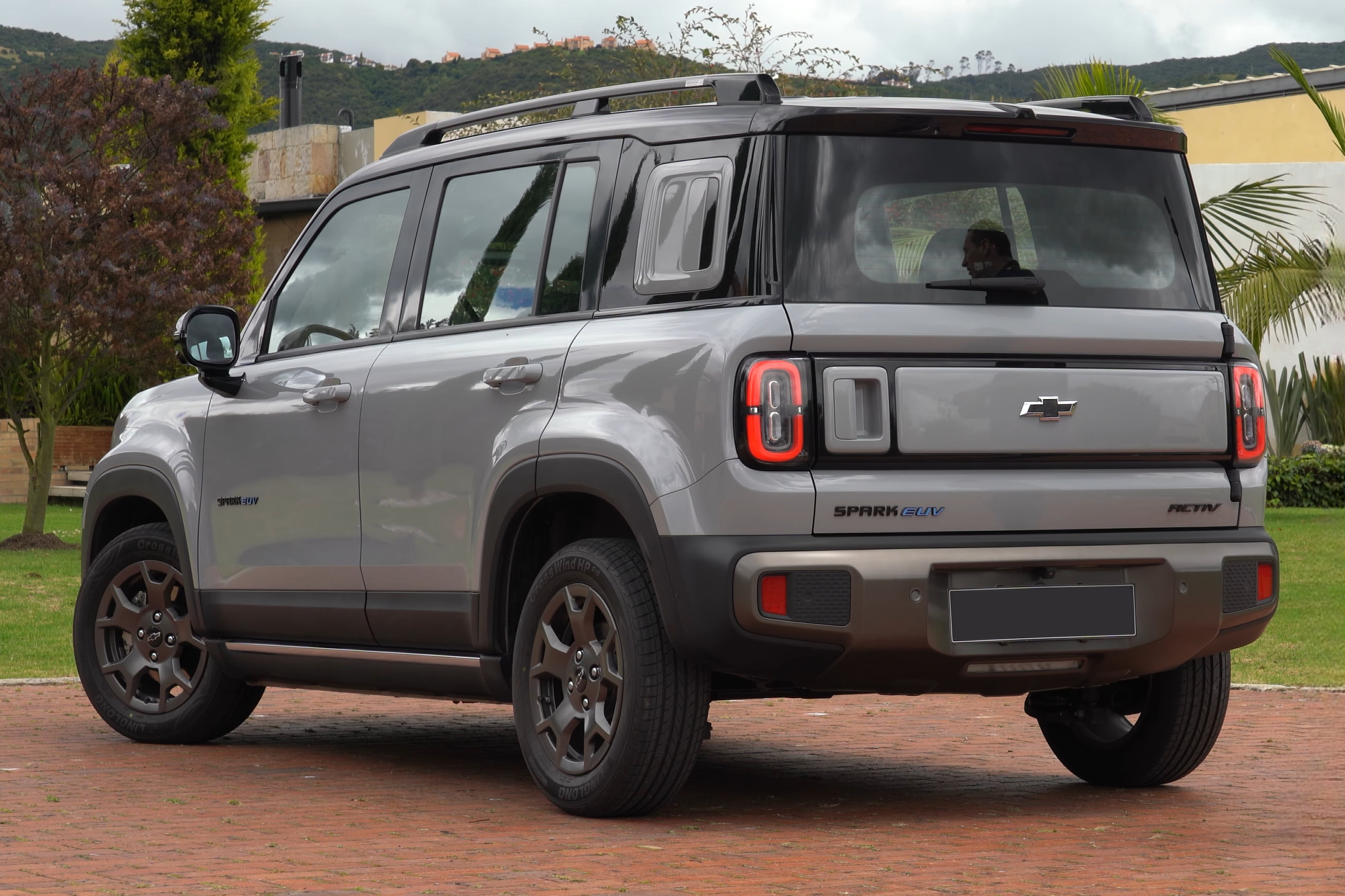
Rear view

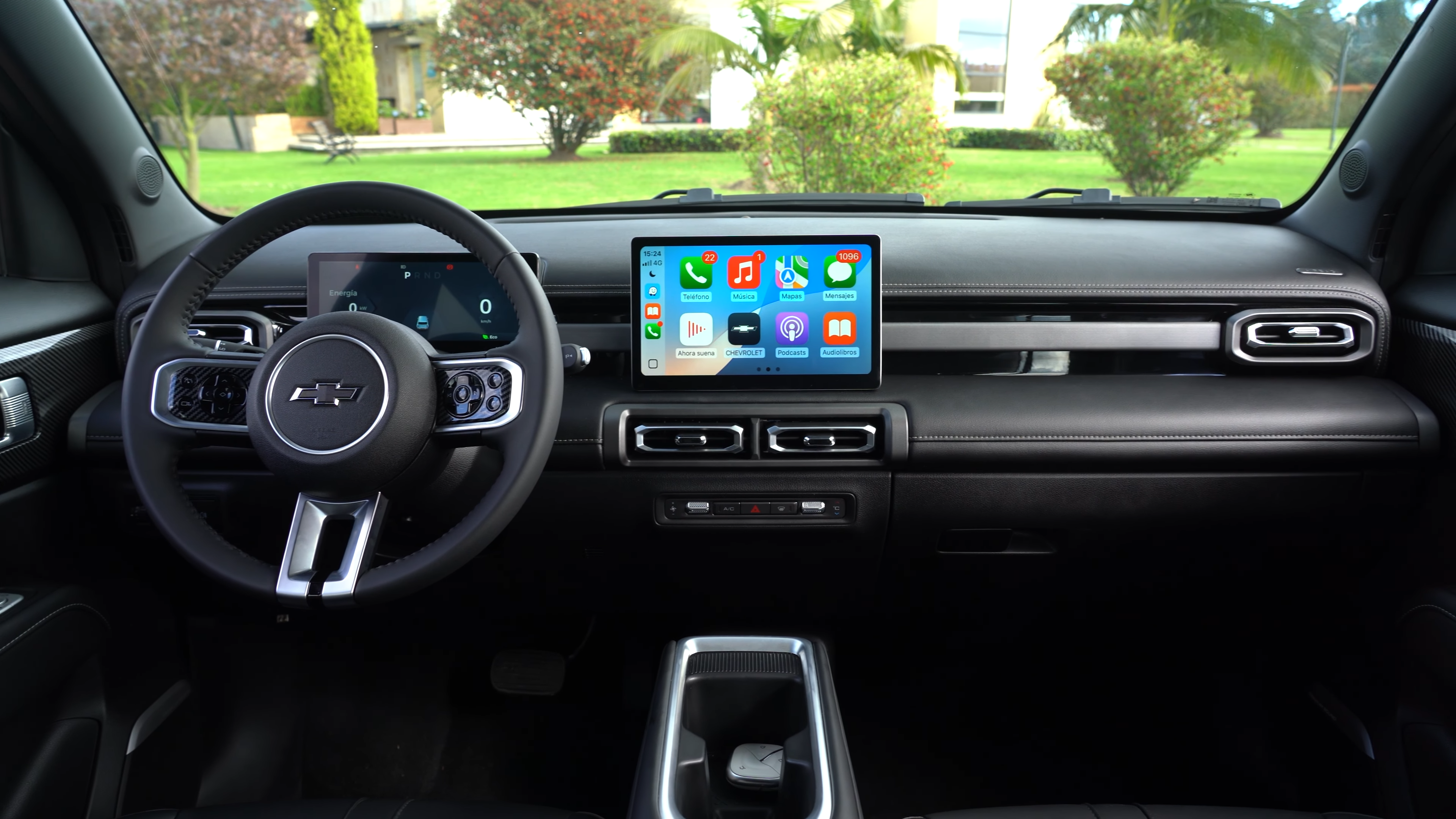
Interior

=== 2026 update ===
The 2026 update for the Yep Plus was scheduled to be launched on May 27, 2025. It features updates to the interior and new battery capacity options. The vehicle has become a 5-seater, with the addition of a center seat to the second row. The central infotainment screen has been upgraded from 10.1 in (260 mm) to 12.8 in (330 mm) with higher brightness, and adds camping and nap modes. It also receives improved sound insulation. In addition to the original 41.9 kWh LFP battery option with a 401 km (249 mi) CLTC range rating, the 2026 Yep Plus receives options for smaller 32 kWh and larger 54 kWh LFP packs with 301 and 501 km (187 and 311 mi) of range, respectively.

== Sales ==
Year	China	
Year	Yep	Yep Plus
2023	14,683	—
2024	9,428	6,262
2025	5,276	25,435
