= Bingo =

Bingo or B-I-N-G-O may refer to:

== Arts and entertainment ==
=== Gaming ===
- Bingo (American version), a game of chance usually using a printed card of numbers in a 5x5 grid
- Bingo (British version), a game of chance usually using a printed card of 3 rows of 5 numbers
- Bingo (card game), named by analogy to the game Bingo
- Bingo (domino game)
- Bingo (Scrabble), a term used for playing all seven tiles

=== Film ===
- Bingo (1974 film), a French-Canadian thriller
- Bingo (1991 film), an American family comedy about a dog
- Bingo (1998 film), an animated short film
- Bingo (2012 film), a Japanese horror film
- Bingo: The King of the Mornings, a 2017 Brazilian drama film

=== Music ===
==== Albums ====
- Bingo (The Whispers album), 1974
- Bingo (Rova Saxophone Quartet album), 1998
- Bingo, a 2006 album by Bela B.
- Bingo! (album), by the Steve Miller Band, 2010

==== Songs ====
- "Bingo" (folk song), an English children's folk song about a dog
- "B-I-N-G-O (Bingo)", by The Turbans, 1956, also recorded by Pat Boone
- "Bingo!" (AKB48 song), 2007
- "Bingo" (Gucci Mane song), 2010
- "Bingo", by Catch, 1997
- "Bingo" (빙고), by Koyote, 2004
- "Bingo" (빙고), by 24K, 2016
- "Bingo", a B-side from "Hands Up (4 Lovers)" by Right Said Fred, 1993
- "Bingo", from the soundtrack of the 1993 film Bingo sung by Lise Thouin
- "Bingo", by The Whispers from the 1974 album Bingo
- "Bingo", by Skeleton Crew from the 1986 album The Country of Blinds
- "Bingo", by M.I.A. from the 2005 album Arular

=== Other uses in arts and entertainment ===
- "Bingo" (Better Call Saul), a 2015 TV episode
- "Bingo" a 1992 episode of Roseanne
- Bingo (play), by Edward Bond, 1973
- Bingo! The Horrifying Eyewitness Account of a Prison Riot, a 1985 book by Roger Caron

== People ==
- Bingo (nickname), including a list of people and fictional characters with the name
- Bingo Gazingo (1925–2010), poet Murray Wachs

== Places ==
- Bingo, Boulgou, Burkina Faso
- Bingo, Boulkiemdé, Burkina Faso
  - Bingo Department, Burkina Faso
- Bingo Province, a former province of Japan
- Bingo, Maine, United States

== Other uses ==
- Bingo (supermarket), in Bosnia and Herzegovina
- BINGO (telescope), a radio telescope in Brazil
- BINGO, a multi-service tactical brevity code for fuel state needed for recovery
- BINGO, Business-oriented International NGO, or Big International NGO
- Bingo Airways, a former Polish charter airline
- Bingo Stadium, a multi-use stadium in Onomichi, Hiroshima, Japan
- Wuling Binguo, or Wuling Bingo, a Chinese car model

== See also ==
- Binghamton, New York, United States
