= PlayCity Casino =

Mexican casino chain

- PlayCity in Cancún, 2010
- Type: Subsidiary
- Industry: Gambling
- Founded: 2006; 20 years ago
- Founder: Grupo Televisa
- Headquarters: Mexico
- Number of locations: 17 casinos (2025)
- Area served: Mexico
- Services: Casinos, sports betting, online gambling
- Parent: Ollamani
- Website: playcity.com

PlayCity Casino, or simply PlayCity, is a chain of casinos in Mexico. As of 2025 it had 17 casinos in 12 states, with more than 5,800 gaming machines, plus online gambling and sports betting at playcity.com. It is operated by Apuestas Internacionales, S.A. de C.V. Grupo Televisa started the chain in 2006, under a federal gaming permit issued in May 2005 that caused a political scandal at the time. Since the 2024 spin-off of Televisa's sports and gaming assets it belongs to Ollamani, the company that also owns Club América and the Estadio Azteca. It is Ollamani's most profitable business.

== History ==
=== Gaming permit ===
Gambling in Mexico falls under the Federal Law of Games and Draws, a law from 1947, and permits are issued by the Secretariat of the Interior (Secretaría de Gobernación, SEGOB). In 2005 Apuestas Internacionales, S.A. de C.V., a company set up that year and owned by Televisa Juegos and Grupo Televisa, got permit DGAJS/SCEVF/P-05/2005. It allowed 65 gambling halls (casas de juego) and as many remote betting centers, i.e. sports books. The permit is dated 25 May 2005 and runs 25 years, until 24 May 2030.

The permit was signed days before Santiago Creel resigned as Secretary of the Interior to seek the PAN nomination for president, and there were accusations of a deal with Televisa's main shareholders for more airtime for his campaign. In all, seven companies got permits from Creel's ministry, for 286 casinos. A commission of Congress opened an investigation, and the Chamber of Deputies had already challenged the new gaming regulations before the Supreme Court. In June 2005 an internal SEGOB audit, ordered by Creel's successor Carlos Abascal, concluded the permit had been issued in line with the rules; the PAN cleared Creel the same week.

=== Under Televisa ===
Televisa opened its first PlayCity casinos in 2006. In 2007 it added Multijuegos, a national lottery sold through about 9,000 terminals, among them Oxxo convenience stores. At the end of 2014 there were 17 PlayCity casinos. The permit allowed up to 55. In the first quarter of 2015 the games and draws (juegos y sorteos) business (PlayCity and Multijuegos together) took in 607.4 million pesos, against 19.9 billion for Televisa as a whole. Its main competitors were Codere, CIE and Grupo Caliente. In 2015 the consulting firm Palladium Group put PlayCity in its Balanced Scorecard Hall of Fame, saying revenue had grown 30% by 2014 after the company adopted the method in 2011. In December 2017 SEGOB let Televisa suspend Multijuegos.

A PlayCity on the upper floor of the Paseo Mochis mall in Los Mochis closed for good in 2015; a state official blamed competition from other casinos and the second-floor location. Another occupied the former Cine Las Américas in Colonia Hipódromo, then closed, and the building stood empty for several years. The old cinema hall is now the Auditorio BB, a concert venue. There was also a PlayCity in Cancún, but it is not among the current locations.

In 2016 Televisa signed with Kambi to supply sports betting in 16 PlayCity casinos. In October 2017 it launched PlayCityApuestas.com, an online sportsbook on the same Kambi platform.

=== Attempted sale ===
In 2018 Televisa's new management under Alfonso de Angoitia decided to sell off businesses outside media. In August 2018 Reforma reported that Televisa was in talks to sell PlayCity Casino and PlayCity Apuestas for around US$300 million. Codere and Blackstone (the new owner of Cirsa) were named as interested. At the time the chain had 17 casinos with 7,200 machines and was third in the Mexican gaming market by share. It had 4 million visitors in 2017, 42% more than in 2016, and revenue of US$147.4 million. Televisa did not report PlayCity separately; it was part of its "Other businesses" segment. The sale did not go ahead. In 2019 Codere was still said to be looking at buying the 17 casinos, with Credit Suisse advising.

=== Ollamani ===
On 20 February 2024 Televisa completed the spin-off of Ollamani, S.A.B., which took Club América, the Estadio Azteca, PlayCity and the magazine publisher Editorial Televisa. Ollamani shares began trading on the Mexican Stock Exchange on 22 February 2024, under the ticker AGUILAS. The listing document showed that PlayCity (then more than 18 locations and 6,000 machines) brought in 49.5% of Ollamani's revenue for January to September 2023, more than the club and stadium together. Gaming revenue was 2,223.8 million pesos for that period, up 22%. A financial analyst, Ulises Avelar, told El CEO that judging by the numbers Ollamani was more of a casino company than a football one.

PlayCity's operating income was 674.6 million pesos in 2024, a margin of 24.5%, the highest of Ollamani's three segments. In 2025 it made 632.3 million pesos, against 43.8 million for the football segment. For the first half of 2026 the figure was 345.3 million pesos.

== Operations ==
As of 2025 PlayCity had 17 casinos: three in Mexico City, three in Nuevo León, two in Jalisco, and one each in Aguascalientes, Ciudad Juárez, Culiacán, Durango, Hermosillo, Metepec, Tepic, Xalapa and Mérida. Together they had more than 5,800 gaming machines and about 3.5 million visits a year. Ollamani says it aims mainly at the upper socioeconomic segment. The loyalty program has five tiers and more than 205,000 active accounts, and the average spend per visit is around 775 pesos.

The casinos are mainly slot machines, plus table games. Suppliers include Zitro, which had some 2,700 machines in PlayCity casinos as of 2023, Konami and Novomatic. In 2018 Novomatic launched a slot game based on the film From Dusk till Dawn in all PlayCity casinos, with the main event at PlayCity Plaza Real in Monterrey. Konami's slots went live for real money on playcity.com in January 2025. Active online accounts grew 35% in 2025.
