= Paseo Mochis =

Paseo Los Mochis, is a two-story shopping center located in Los Mochis, Sinaloa, México. The mall is anchored by an AMERICAN EAGLE STORE, Liverpool department store, C&A, PlayCity casino (closed in 2015) and a 12-screen movie theater Cinemex. it opened in November 2008

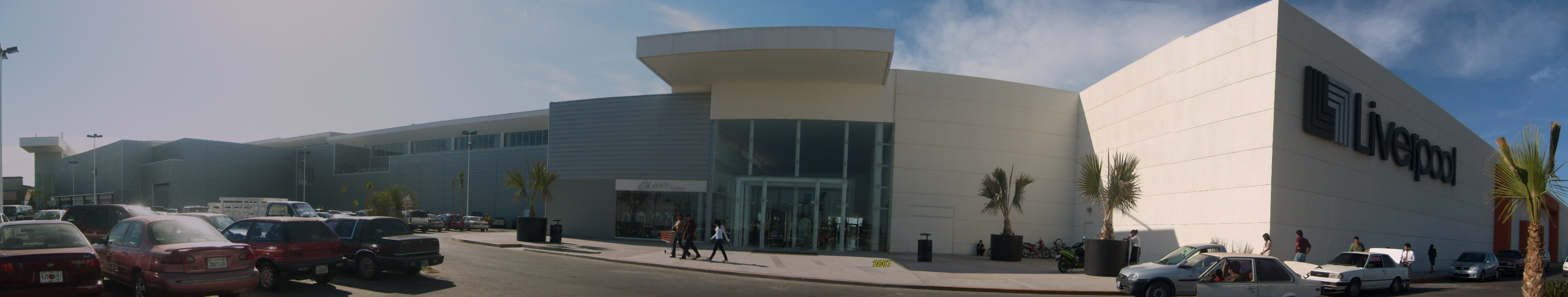
Paseo Los Mochis
