= Wuling Binguo Pro =

Battery electric subcompact car

Overview
- Manufacturer: SAIC-GM-Wuling
- Model code: E262C
- Production: May 2026 – present
- Assembly: China: Liuzhou, Guangxi

Body and chassis
- Class: Subcompact car (B)
- Body style: 5-door hatchback
- Layout: Front-motor, front-wheel-drive
- Platform: Tianyu Architecture
- Related: Wuling Binguo; Wuling Binguo Plus; Wuling Binguo S

Powertrain
- Electric motor: Permanent magnet synchronous motor
- Power output: 65 kW (87 hp; 88 PS)
- Battery: 31.9 kWh LFP; 37.9 kWh LFP
- Electric range: 330–403 km (205–250 mi) (CLTC)

Dimensions
- Wheelbase: 2,560 mm (100.8 in)
- Length: 4,050 mm (159.4 in)
- Width: 1,758 mm (69.2 in)
- Height: 1,580 mm (62.2 in)

The Wuling Binguo Pro (Chinese: 五菱缤果PRO; pinyin: Wǔlíng Bīnguǒ Pro), commonly mentioned in English sources as the Wuling Bingo Pro, is a battery electric subcompact car manufactured by SAIC-GM-Wuling (SGMW) since 2026 under the Wuling brand. It sits within the Binguo family alongside the base Binguo and the Binguo S.

== Overview ==
Details of the Binguo Pro first was surfaced in December 2025, when regulatory filings submitted to China Ministry of Industry and Information Technology revealed a variant of Binguo with updated design and fitted with a 65 kW (87 hp; 88 PS) motor. Its official debut followed in March 2026.

Pre-sales opened in China on 14 April 2026, with four variants offered. By 13 May 2026, SGMW reported more than 30,000 locked-in orders and over 10,000 completed deliveries in under a month, ahead of the model's formal retail launch on 22 May 2026.

=== Design ===
The Binguo Pro carries over the retro-influenced styling used across the Binguo range, with rounded LED headlamps, a closed front fascia, semi-hidden door handles, and a floating roof treatment. At 4,050 mm (159.4 in) long on a 2,560 mm (100.8 in) wheelbase, it is slightly longer than the standard Binguo while sharing the same wheelbase. The model is also equipped with a front trunk, which is not offered in the standard Binguo.

The cabin of the Binguo Pro uses a five-seat layout with a floating infotainment display, wireless phone charging, and Wuling's Lingyu voice-assistant system.

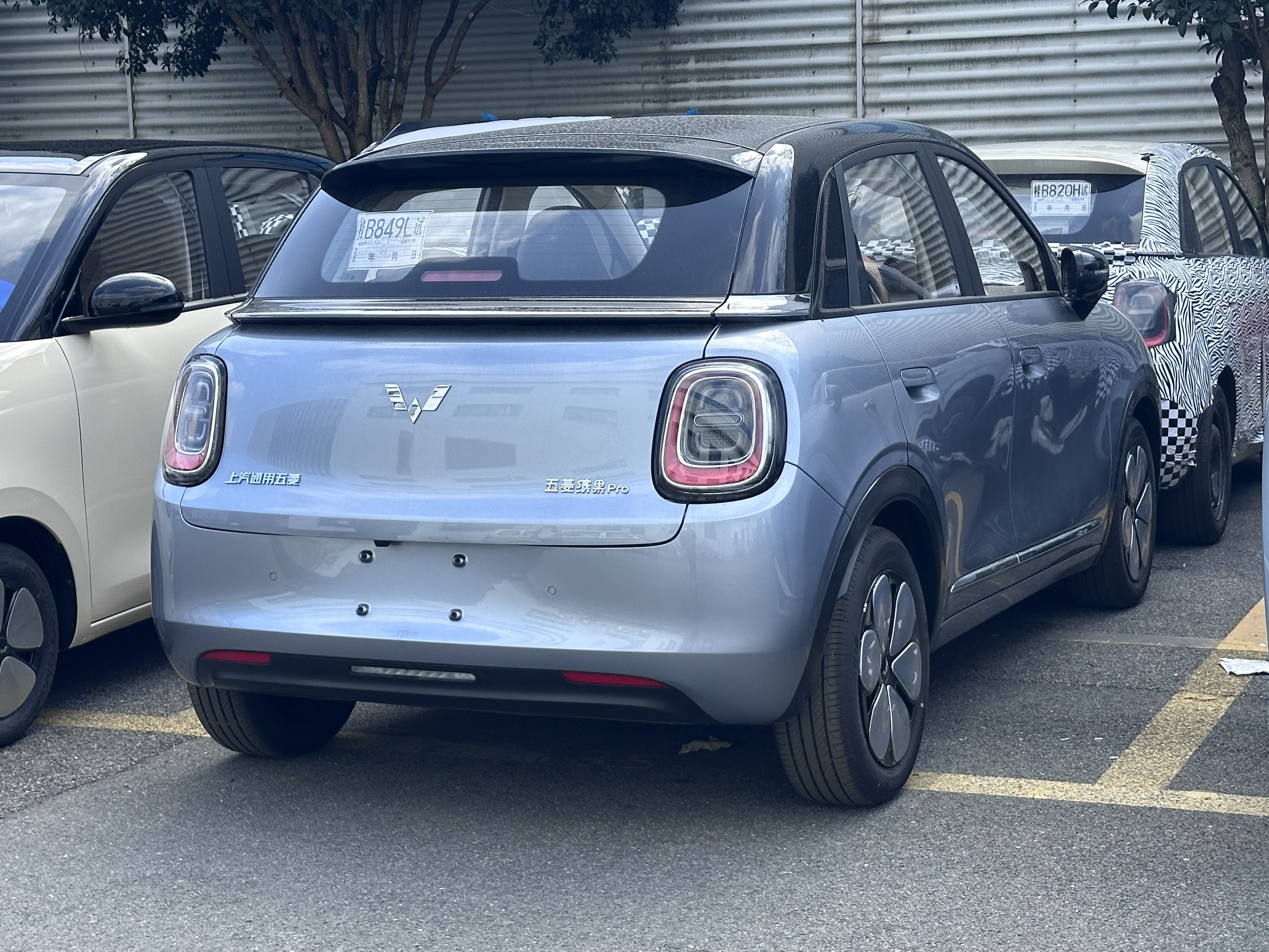
Rear view

== Powertrain ==
The Binguo Pro is powered by a front-mounted permanent magnet synchronous motor producing 65 kW (87 hp; 88 PS). It is offered with two LFP battery options. The base version uses a 31.9 kWh pack rated at 330 km (205 mi) (CLTC) and the higher variants uses a 37.9 kWh pack rated at 403 km (250 mi). DC fast charging takes the battery from 30 to 80 percent in roughly 30 to 35 minutes, while onboard AC charging capacity was doubled over the standard Binguo, from 3.3 kW to 6.6 kW, cutting a full AC charge from around nine hours to six. Vehicle-to-load discharge functionality is also fitted.
