= Codere =

Spanish gambling company

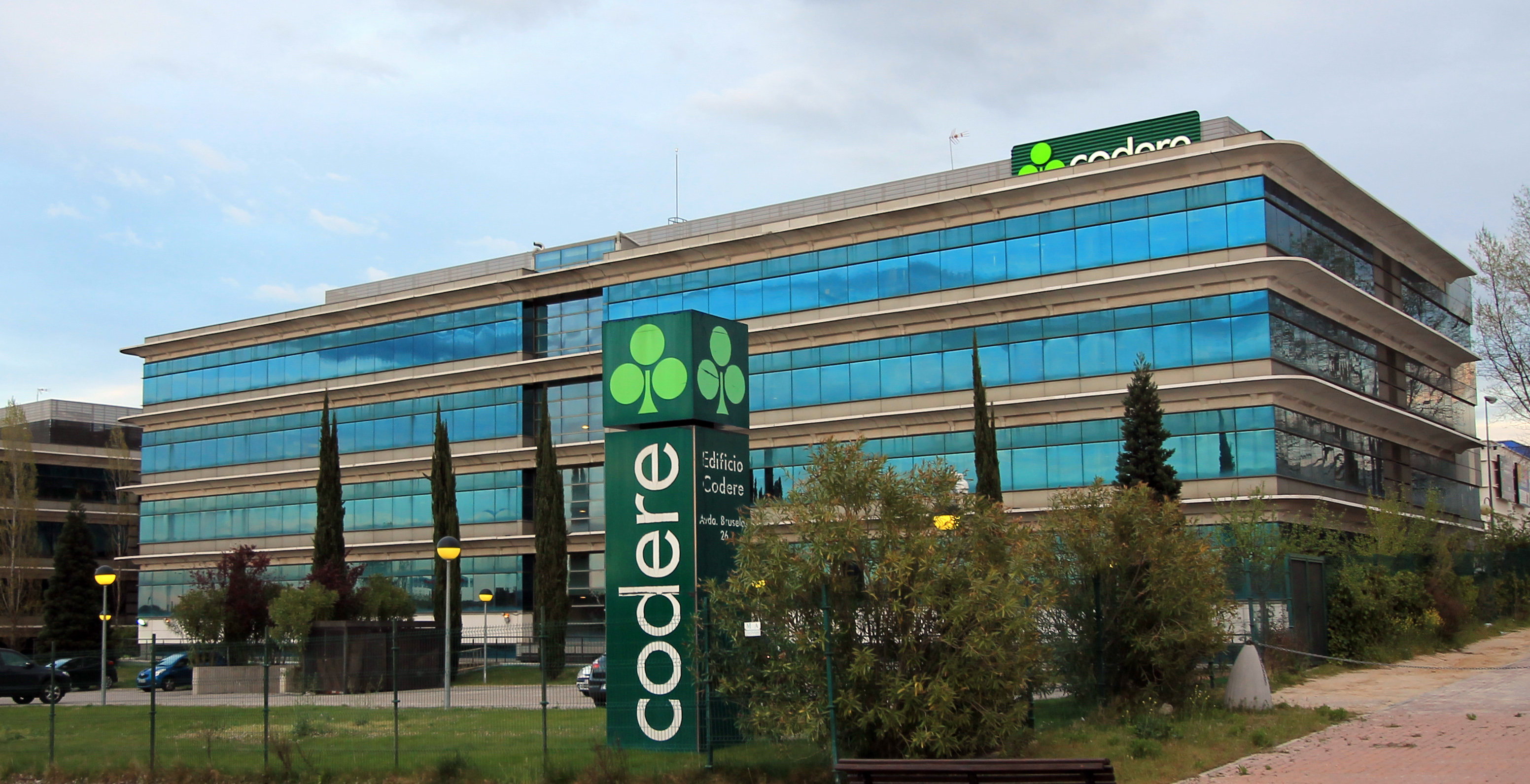
- Codere’s headquarters
- Type: Company
- ISIN: ES0119256115
- Industry: Gambling
- Founded: 1980
- Founder: José Antonio Martínez Sampedro; Luis Javier Martínez Sampedro
- Headquarters: Madrid, Spain
- Area served: Spain; Mexico; Colombia; Argentina; Italy; Uruguay; Panama
- Key people: Gonzaga Higuero (CEO)
- Products: Bingo, Sports betting, casino, Horse racing, Online gambling
- Services: Sports betting and casino
- Revenue: 1,357,100,000 euro (2025)
- Number of employees: 3,885 (2025)
- Website: Codere

Codere is a gambling operator with a presence in Spain, Italy, Mexico, Panama, Colombia, Argentina and Uruguay.

In the digital segment, Codere operates through its subsidiary Codere Online, focused on sports betting and online gambling.

On 19 October 2007, the company began trading on the Madrid Stock Exchange under the ticker CDR. It stopped trading in 2021 after the value of its shares fell by 27.8%. From its stock-market debut to its delisting, Codere lost 99.998% of its value. In 2025, a judicial investigation linked the company to the Montoro case over payments of 679,000 euros while key regulations for the online gambling sector, which benefited Codere, were being processed and applied.

== History ==
The Martinez Sampedro family, a group managing amusement machines, and the Franco brothers, owners of Recreativos Franco, one of Spain's most important amusement-machine manufacturers, founded Codere in Madrid in 1980. Codere began its activities with amusement machines and, after consolidating that business, began to expand into Latin America and decided to diversify into other areas such as betting shops, bingo halls and casinos. In the following years, Codere expanded geographically and acquired different companies, casinos and racetracks, which allowed it to consolidate and strengthen its financial position. In 2008, after the approval of a law that benefited the company, Codere became the first company to open a physical betting shop in Spain. From 2008 onward, while politician Rafael Catala was secretary general of the company, Codere paid around 140,000 euros per year to Equipo Economico, the firm founded by Cristobal Montoro, reaching a total of 679,000 euros by 2012. During that period, Spanish legislation and tax regulation approved for online gambling favored the company. From 2014, Codere experienced serious financial problems that led, in 2016, to a deep restructuring of the group's equity, bringing creditors into the capital structure and increasing capital by 495 million euros. In July 2020, the board of directors avoided the company's bankruptcy by obtaining 200 million euros from various vulture funds, which were also creditors and bondholders of the group. Codere, whose most recent ratings had placed it at junk-bond level, saw its stock-market capitalization fall in the preceding years from more than 1 billion euros to less than 200 million euros that year. The company has undergone major changes in its shareholder structure since its foundation. At the end of 2020, more than 70% of its capital was in the hands of different foreign investment funds, while the Martinez Sampedro family retained only around 14%. In 2021, as a consequence of its inability to meet its heavy debt burden, the group's liquidation procedure began. After a debt restructuring, 95% of the company was left in the hands of bondholders. On 6 May 2022, Codere shares traded for the last time on the Spanish Continuous Market and were then permanently excluded from the Spanish stock exchange; the shares had been suspended from trading since December of the previous year. The financial restructuring process involved the creation of a new holding company based in Luxembourg, Codere New Topco, which would replace Codere S.A.

== Operations ==
Codere Online is the division responsible for the group’s digital business, operating in several regulated markets.

Since the company was founded in 1980, Codere has had thousands of gaming terminals, gaming halls, racetracks, sports-betting shops and online games with a global presence. It has operated more than 57,130 machines and had more than 29,500 bingo seats and more than 7,700 sports-betting terminals in Latin America, Spain and Italy through points of sale that included 148 gaming halls, 1,119 amusement arcades, nearly 10,000 bars, 602 betting shops and four racetracks. The company also develops online games. Because of the COVID-19 pandemic in 2020, the company was forced that year to close all its gaming halls in the different countries in which it operates, applying a temporary layoff scheme in Spain for more than 1,300 employees in order to save costs.

=== Spain ===
Codere's origins are in Spain. Since its beginnings, the company has been involved in continuous restructurings, financial ups and downs, debt issuances and legal conflicts. Of its fourteen years listed on the stock exchange, nine ended in losses, a constant pattern from 2012 onward. In 2014 and 2016 there were two major financial restructurings. In 2016, Codere increased capital by 495 million euros and obtained 30% of the market. It developed its own gaming platform after obtaining permits from Spain's Directorate General for the Regulation of Gambling (DGOJ) and, that same year, reached a sponsorship agreement with Real Madrid CF as its official betting house for the following three seasons. However, the loss-making situation worsened and the company was unable to stop the progressive decline. In 2021, it recorded net losses of 338.6 million euros, despite having increased revenue by 33% during the previous year.

=== Mexico ===
Codere arrived in Mexico in 1998 after signing alliances with CIE and Grupo Caliente. The opening of establishments was made possible by seven permits granted to the company by the competent federal authority, authorizing the installation of gaming terminals and the opening of gaming halls, betting shops and a racetrack. Codere came to have 19,607 gaming terminals, 92 establishments, 89 betting locations and a racetrack in Mexico City. It also operates an online site, which has all necessary permits from Mexico's Secretariat of the Interior (SEGOB).

=== Colombia ===
Codere began operations in Colombia in 1984 and became the country's largest operator of amusement machines. With authorization from Coljuegos, Codere operates in Colombia only online, unlike in countries such as Spain and Mexico, where it has physical establishments.

=== Argentina ===
Codere is present in the private gambling sector in Argentina, where it operates gaming terminals and bingo halls. Codere Argentina has been the company with the largest number of bingo halls in the Province of Buenos Aires, with a total of 14 halls in operation and more than 6,000 amusement machines.

=== Italy ===
Codere began operations in Italy in 2001 by managing Operbingo halls. Later, Codere acquired other bingo halls.

=== Uruguay ===
In Uruguay, Codere is present in the capital, Montevideo, as well as in its outskirts, as manager of Maronas Racetrack. The company transformed the racetrack into an entertainment center by combining horse racing with casino games such as amusement and betting machines. It also operates Montevideo's Hotel Carrasco in alliance with Sofitel.

=== Panama ===
The company manages a wide variety of businesses in Panama, including gaming terminals, casinos, betting shops and a racetrack. In 2016, the company celebrated the 60th anniversary of the Presidente Remon Racetrack, the only racetrack in Central America.
