= Bingo, Maine =

- Village
- Location within Maine
- Coordinates: 45°20′56″N 67°40′35″W
- Country: United States
- State: Maine
- County: Washington
- Elevation: 341 ft (104 m)
- Time zone: UTC-5 (Eastern (EST))
  - Summer (DST): UTC-4 (EDT)
- Area code: 207
- GNIS feature ID: 579136

Bingo is an unincorporated village in Washington County, Maine, United States.
