= Wuling Binguo S =

Battery electric compact hatchback

Overview
- Manufacturer: SAIC-GM-Wuling
- Model code: E261MCE
- Production: 2025–present
- Assembly: China: Liuzhou, Guangxi

Body and chassis
- Class: Compact car (C)
- Body style: 5-door hatchback
- Layout: Front-motor, front-wheel-drive
- Platform: Tianyu Architecture-M
- Related: Wuling Binguo; Wuling Binguo Plus; Wuling Binguo Pro

Powertrain
- Electric motor: 75 kW TZ180XS275 permanent magnet
- Power output: 101 hp (75 kW; 102 PS)
- Battery: 31.9 kWh LFP Gotion; 41.9 kWh LFP Rept Battero
- Electric range: 325–510 km (202–317 mi) (CLTC)

Dimensions
- Wheelbase: 2,610 mm (102.8 in)
- Length: 4,265 mm (167.9 in)
- Width: 1,785 mm (70.3 in)
- Height: 1,600 mm (63.0 in)
- Curb weight: 1,250–1,325 kg (2,756–2,921 lb)

The Wuling Binguo S (Chinese: 五菱缤果S; pinyin: Wǔlíng Bīnguǒ S), commonly mentioned in English sources as the Wuling Bingo S, is a battery electric compact hatchback manufactured by SAIC-GM-Wuling (SGMW) since 2025 under the Wuling brand.

== Overview ==
Rear view

The Binguo S was first revealed in 21 June 2025, with images of the interior was released on 14 August, and presales opening in August 2025. The Binguo S went on sale in China on 27 September 2025 with four variants. As the third model of the Binguo lineup, the Binguo S sits above the Binguo Plus in the series.

The Binguo S is equipped with a MacPherson strut independent front suspension combined with a torsion beam non-independent rear suspension setup.

The interior features an 8.88-inch LCD instrument display and a 12.8-inch touchscreen infotainment display. The two-layer center console has a single 50 W ventilated wireless charging pad and two cupholders on the upper deck, and an open storage compartment with available device charging ports below. The door armrests contain smartphone storage pockets, and the rear of the center console feature two open storage compartments. The cargo area measures 1,450 L (51 cu ft) with the rear seats folded down.

== Powertrain ==
All variants of the Binguo S use a single front-mounted electric motor developing 101 hp (75 kW; 102 PS) and 180 N⋅m (133 lb⋅ft) of torque. At launch, it was available with two lithium iron phosphate battery options: a smaller 31.9 kWh battery providing 325 km (202 mi) of CLTC range, and a larger 41.9 kWh battery delivering a 430 km (267 mi) CLTC range. The Binguo S supports DC fast charging from 30% to 80% state of charge in 35 minutes. The Binguo S has a top speed of 150 km/h (93 mph).

A new variant was revealed in MIIT filings in November 2025, featuring a larger 52.9 kWh battery pack capable of delivering a CLTC range of 525 kilometres (326 mi).

== Sales ==
On 29 September 2025 Wuling said the Binguo S received 55,840 orders within 48 hours of launching, with 7,250 units already delivered.

Year	China
2025	54,296
