= Wuling Bingo Plus =

Battery electric subcompact crossover SUV

Wuling Binguo Plus
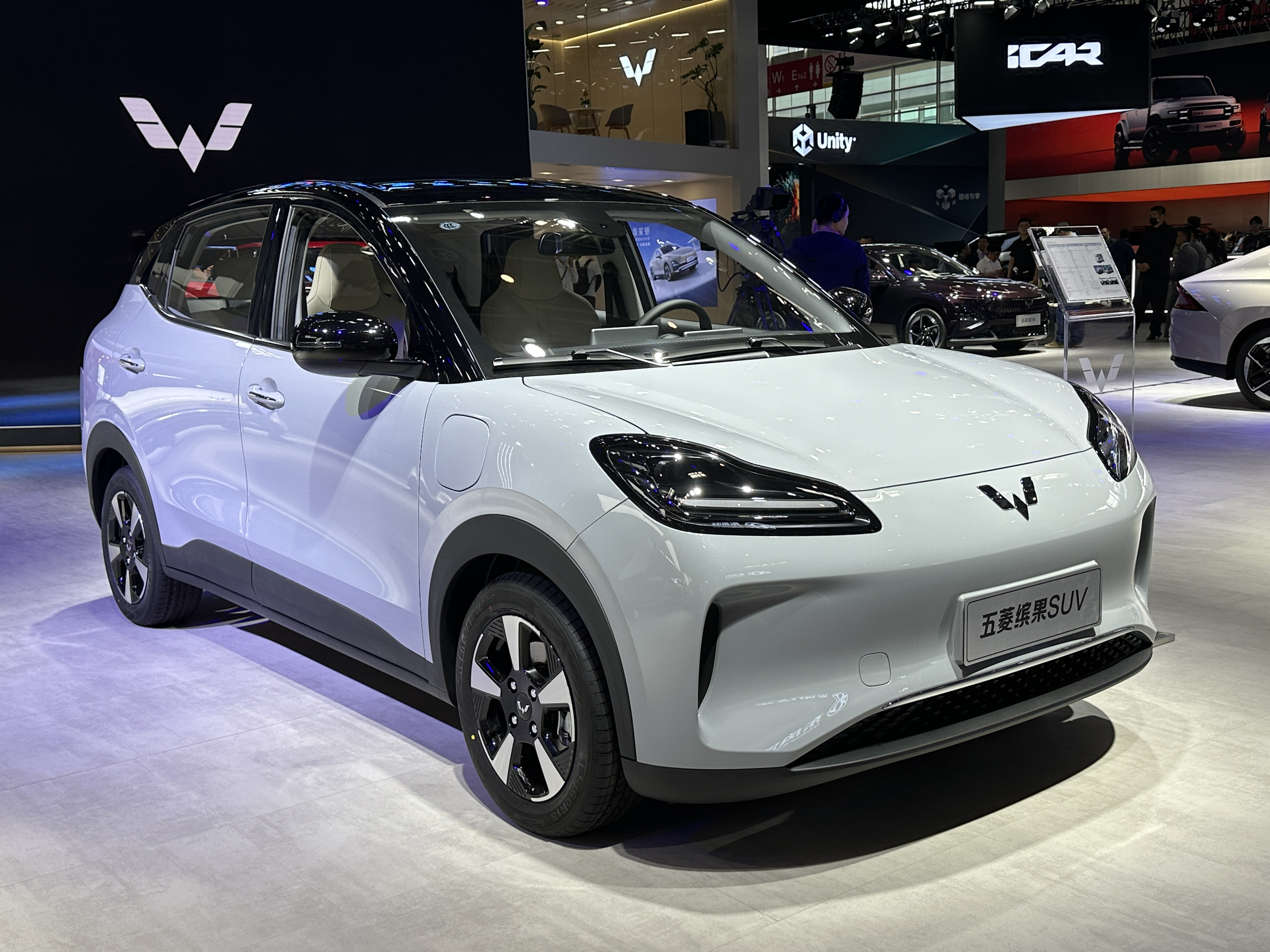

Overview
- Manufacturer: SAIC-GM-Wuling
- Model code: E260MCE
- Also called: Wuling Binguo SUV (2024–2025)
- Production: 2024–present
- Assembly: China: Liuzhou, Guangxi

Body and chassis
- Class: Subcompact crossover SUV (B)
- Body style: 5-door SUV
- Layout: Front-motor, front-wheel-drive
- Platform: Tianyu Architecture-M
- Related: Wuling Binguo; Wuling Binguo S; Wuling Binguo Pro

Powertrain
- Electric motor: 75 kW (101 hp; 102 PS) permanent magnet
- Battery: 50.6 kWh LFP
- Electric range: 401–510 km (249–317 mi)

Dimensions
- Wheelbase: 2,610 mm (102.8 in)
- Length: 4,090 mm (161.0 in)
- Width: 1,720 mm (67.7 in)
- Height: 1,570 mm (61.8 in)
- Kerb weight: 1,235–1,330 kg (2,723–2,932 lb)

The Wuling Binguo Plus (Chinese: 五菱缤果PLUS; pinyin: Wǔlíng Bīnguǒ Plus), commonly mentioned in English sources as the Wuling Bingo Plus, previously the Wuling Binguo SUV, is a battery electric subcompact crossover SUV manufactured by SAIC-GM-Wuling (SGMW) since 2024 under the Wuling brand. Originally launched online as the Binguo Plus, the vehicle was unveiled during 2024 Auto China in April 2024 as the Binguo SUV, to return to the original name as the Binguo Plus in 2025.

== Overview ==
The Binguo Plus went on sale in China on 6 March 2024 with two variants. The exterior design of the Binguo Plus cues from the Binguo hatchback, but less rounded. The interior of the Binguo Plus features two LCD screens that are separated opposed to being merged. The interior adopts a 360-degree skin-friendly soft package design with seats made from faux suede.

The Binguo Plus is claimed to have the longest wheelbase in its class at 2,610 mm (102.8 in) and provides a 912 mm (35.9 in) long second-row seat spacing and a knee-to-knee distance of 89mm. The boot space stands at 1,450 L (51 cu ft) with rear seats are folded down. Inside, there are up to 23 user-friendly storage spaces.

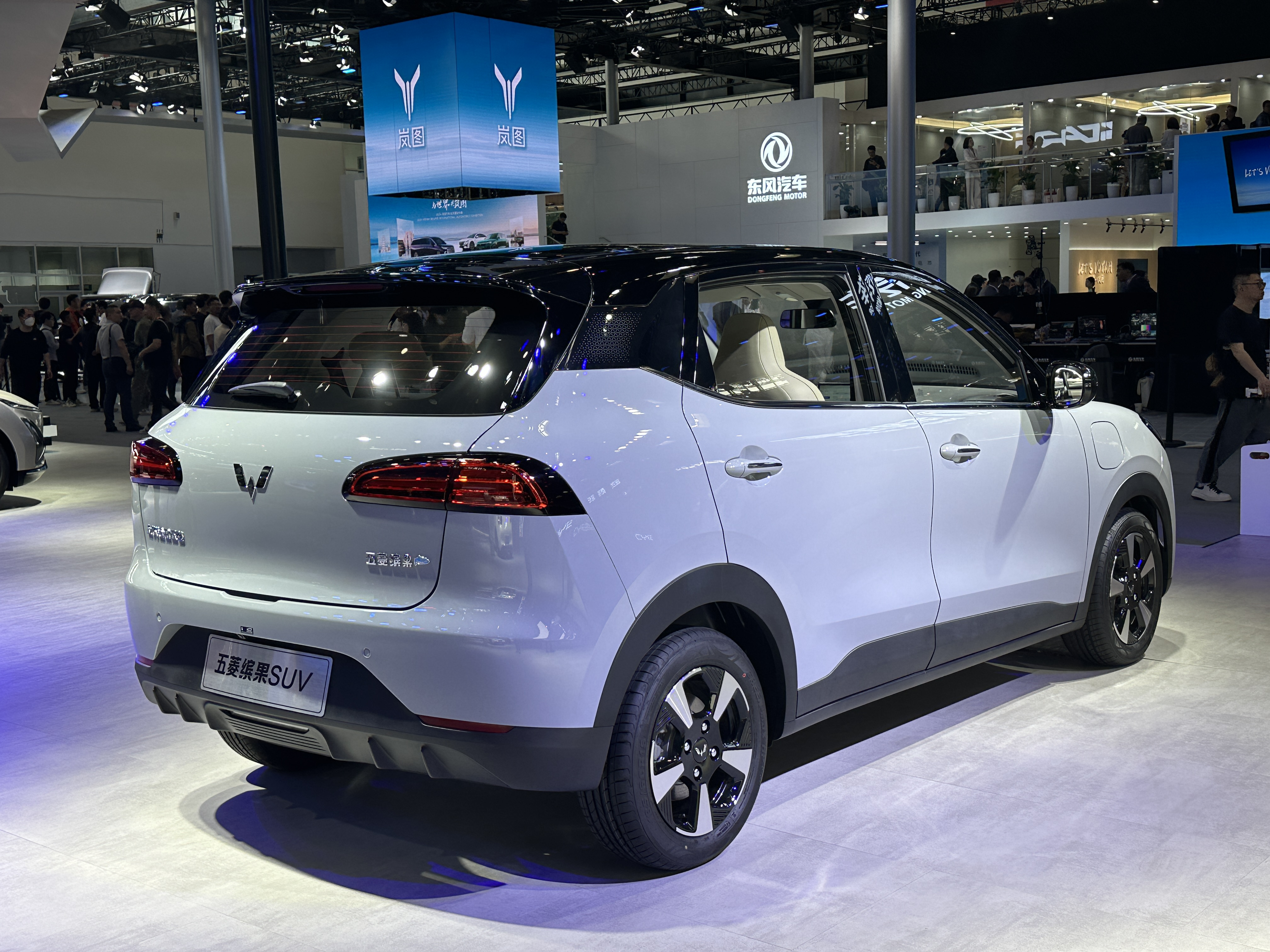
Rear view

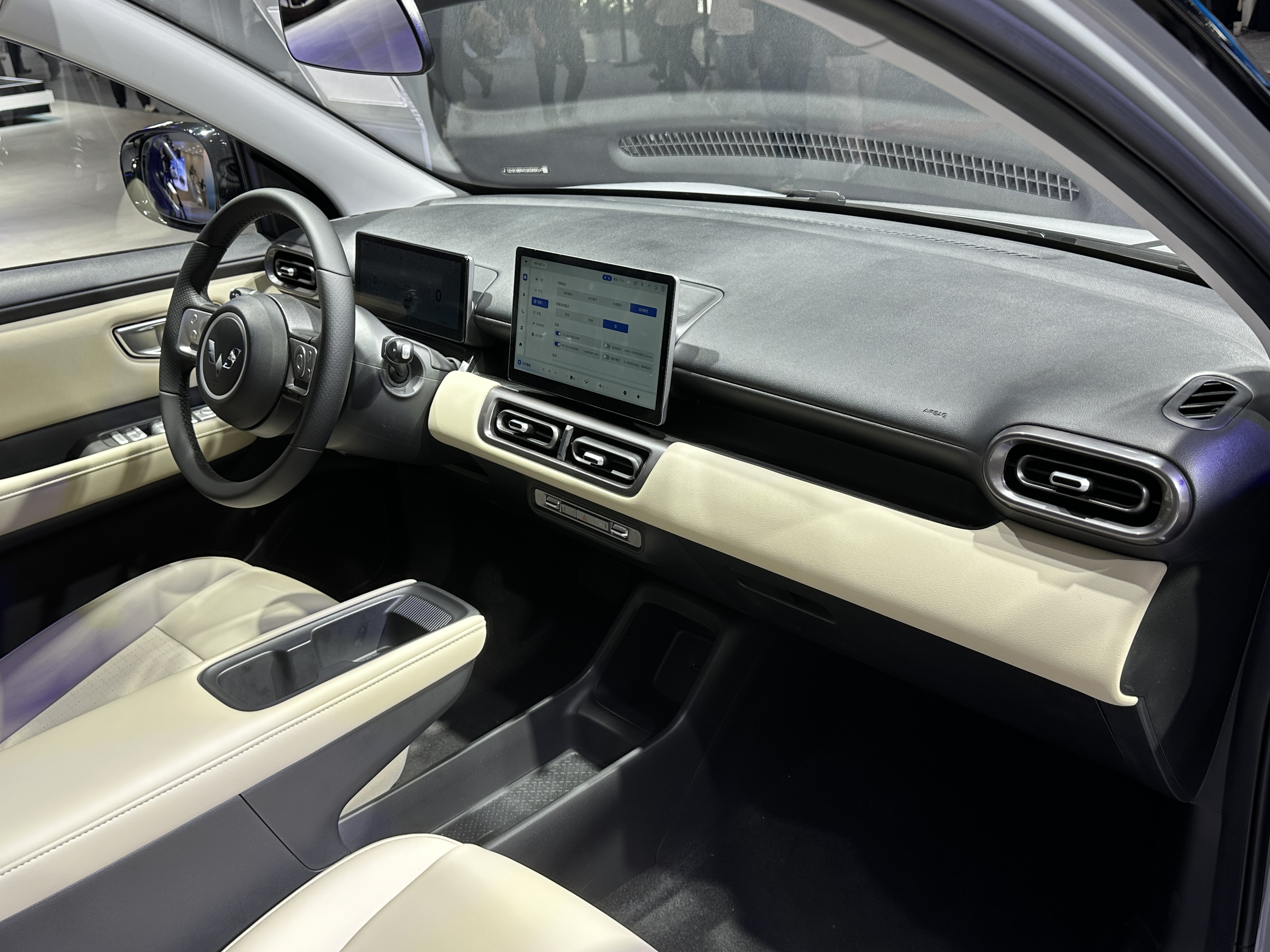
Interior

== Specifications ==
The Binguo Plus is equipped with 75 kW (101 hp; 102 PS) 3-in-1 water-cooled flat wire single electric motor produces a maximum torque of 180 Nm (133 lb ft). There are two range options: 401 km and 510 km. There are three charging modes which includes fast DC charging, from 30 - 80% capacity in 30–35 minutes. It is equipped with a thermal management system and smart energy management technology to achieve an estimated range of 10.1-10.6 km per kWh.

== Sales ==
Year	China
2024	26,200
2025	22,769
