= Bingo (nickname) =

Bingo is a nickname for:

== People ==
- Bingo Bingham (William Horace Bingham, 1885–?), American baseball player
- Bingo DeMoss (Elwood DeMoss, 1889–1965), American baseball player
- Bingo Gazingo (Murray Wachs, 1924–2010), a poet from New York City
- Rudolph Kampman (1914–1987), Canadian National Hockey League player
- Gene "Bingo" O Driscoll, a former Gaelic footballer from the 1980s to the 2000s
- Bingo Smith (Robert Smith, born 1946), American basketball player

== Fictional characters ==
- Bingo, an ape character on the 1968–1970 television series The Banana Splits
- Bingo "Bet-it-all" Beaver, one of the main characters from The Get Along Gang
- Bingo Brown, the preteen protagonist of four novels by Betsy Byars
- Bingo Little, a character in a number of books by comic author P. G. Wodehouse
- Bingo Long, the title character of The Bingo Long Traveling All-Stars & Motor Kings (1976), a baseball movie
- Woodrow "Bingo" Wilkin, known as That Wilkin Boy, in a comic book series
- Bingo (Puppy Dog Pals), a character from the Disney Junior show Puppy Dog Pals
- Bingo Heeler, a puppy character from the Australian children's TV show Bluey
