= Bingo Airways =

Polish charter airline

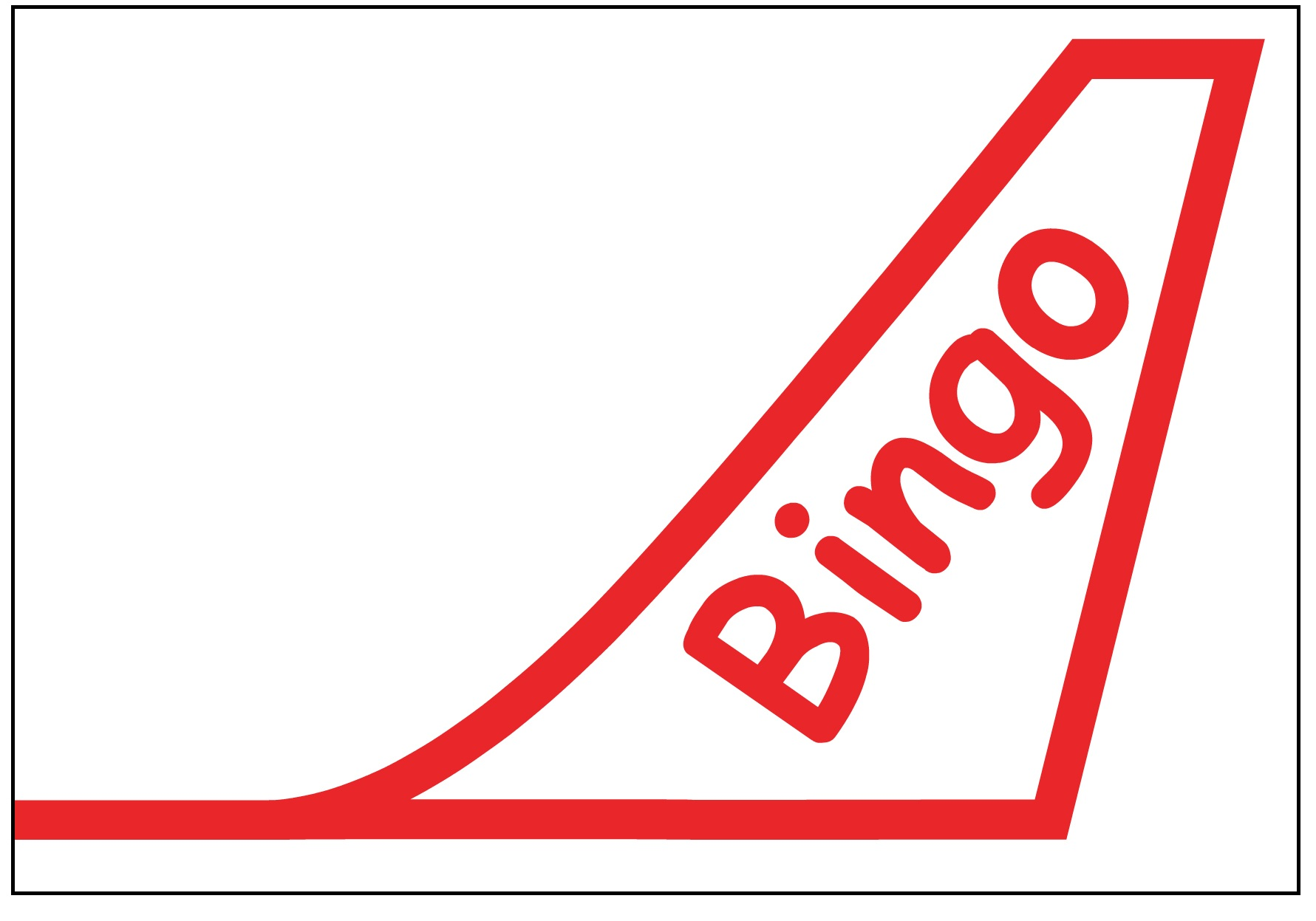
IATA	ICAO	Call sign
–	BGY	SKIMMER
- Founded: November 2011
- Commenced operations: 15 May 2012
- Ceased operations: June 2014
- Operating bases: Katowice Airport; Warsaw Chopin Airport
- Fleet size: 4
- Destinations: 9
- Headquarters: Warsaw, Poland

Bingo Airways was a Polish charter airline based at Warsaw Chopin and Katowice Airports.

== History ==
The airline was founded in November 2011 and started flights on 15 May 2012. The airline flew to destinations in Egypt, Israel, Turkey, Greece, Spain and Tunisia from Poland.

Bingo Airways was well known for the smiley face and bright red nose on the front of its aircraft. One of Bingo's A320-200s, registered SP-ACK, was in a special livery of the Chupa Chups.

On 10 January 2014, Bingo Airways' marketing director Piotr Samson announced that the airline was planning to start up scheduled services but could not disclose any more information on destinations and startup dates until plans were finalized.

By mid-June 2014, Bingo Airways ceased operations as Polish authorities revoked its operating licence.

== Fleet ==
The Bingo Airways fleet as of May 2014:

Bingo Airways fleet
Aircraft	Total	Orders	Passengers	Routes	Notes
Airbus A320-200	4	0	180	Mediterranean charter flights	Leased from MCAP
Total	0	0			

== Destinations ==
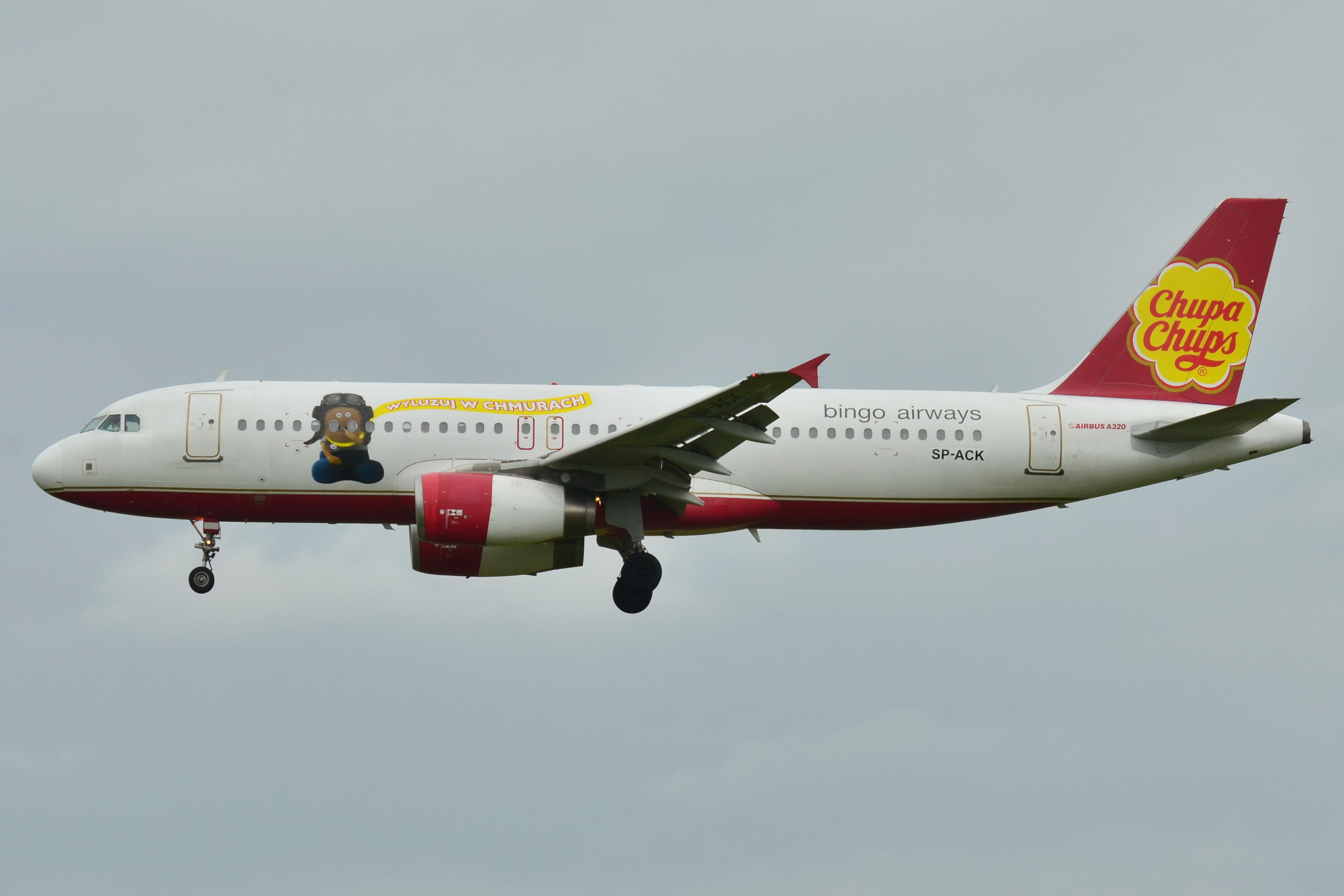
Bingo Airways Airbus A320-200

These are the destinations that were served by Bingo Airways:

Austria

- Vienna: Vienna International Airport

Belgium

- Brussels: Brussels Airport

Bulgaria

- Burgas: Burgas Airport

Cape Verde

- Mindelo: Cesária Évora Airport

Egypt

- Hurghada: Hurghada International Airport
- Sharm el-Sheikh: Sharm el-Sheikh International Airport

France

- Paris: Charles de Gaulle Airport

Germany

- Frankfurt: Frankfurt Airport
- Munich: Munich Airport

Greece

- Heraklion: Heraklion International Airport "Nikos Kazantzakis"
- Rhodes: Rhodes International Airport
- Thessaloniki: Thessaloniki Airport
- Chania: Chania International Airport

Israel

- Tel Aviv: Ben Gurion Airport

Netherlands

- Amsterdam: Amsterdam Airport Schiphol

Poland

- Poznań: Poznań–Ławica Airport
- Warsaw: Warsaw Chopin Airport Base
- Katowice: Katowice International Airport Base
- Wrocław: Wrocław Airport

Spain

- Palma, Majorca: Palma de Mallorca Airport
- Tenerife: Tenerife South Airport

Sweden

- Stockholm: Stockholm Arlanda Airport

Switzerland

- Geneva: Geneva Airport
- Zurich: Zurich Airport

Tunisia

- Enfidha: Enfidha–Hammamet International Airport

Turkey

- Antalya: Antalya Airport
- Bodrum: Milas–Bodrum Airport
