= Wuling Binguo =

Battery electric subcompact car

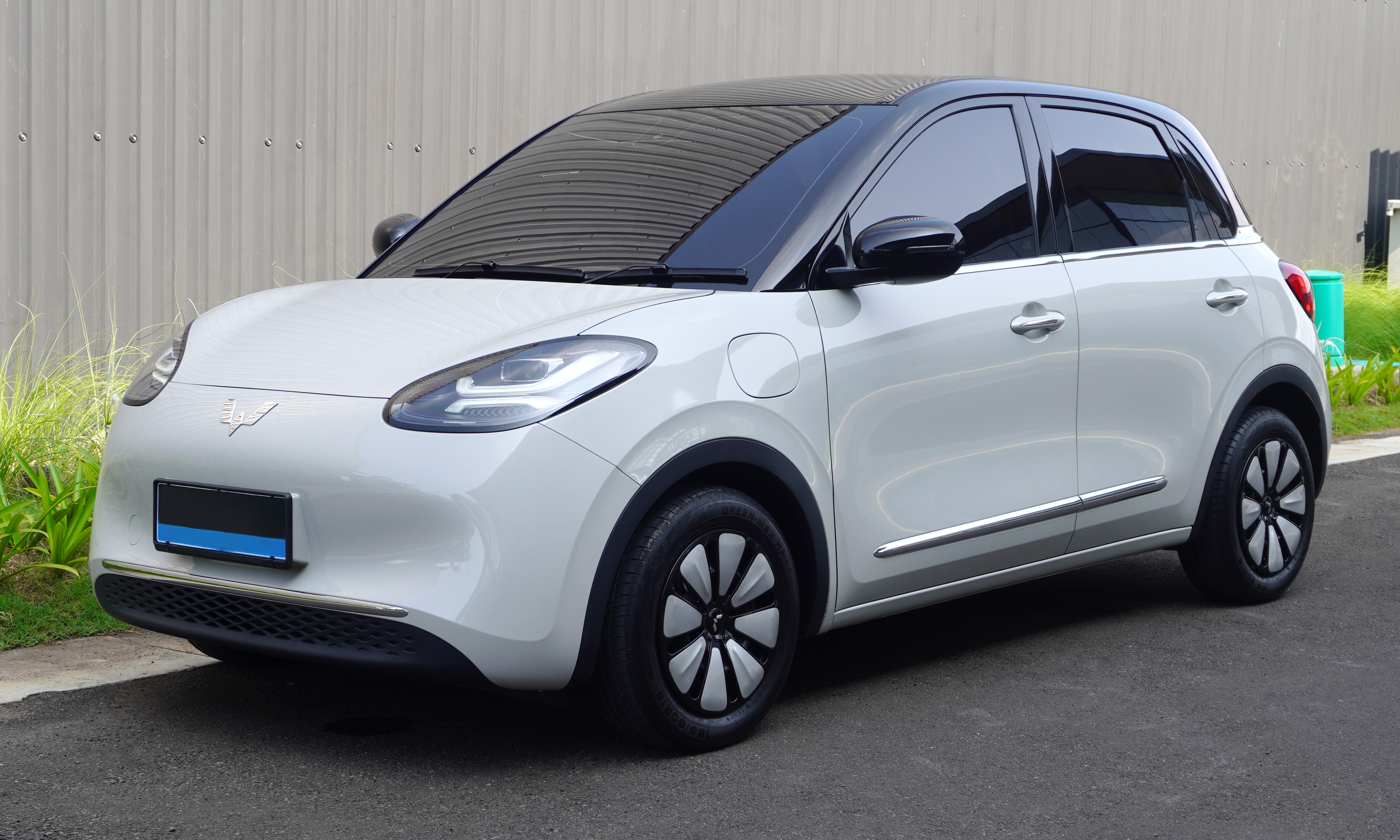

Overview
- Manufacturer: SAIC-GM-Wuling
- Model code: E260
- Also called: TQ Wuling Bingo EV (Malaysia); Reeder ReeV Aura (Turkey); MG Binguo EV (Pakistan)
- Production: 2023–present
- Assembly: China: Liuzhou, Guangxi; Indonesia: Cikarang, West Java (SGMW Indonesia); Thailand: Laem Chabang (EV Primus); Malaysia: Segambut (Tan Chong Motor)

Body and chassis
- Class: Subcompact car (B)
- Body style: 5-door hatchback
- Layout: Front-motor, front-wheel-drive
- Platform: SGMW Global Small Electric Vehicle
- Related: Wuling Binguo Plus; Wuling Binguo S; Wuling Binguo Pro

Powertrain
- Electric motor: 30 kW (40 hp; 41 PS) or 50 kW (67 hp; 68 PS) permanent magnet
- Transmission: Single-speed automatic
- Battery: 17.3 kWh LFP (203 km, CLTC); 31.9 kWh LFP (333 km, CLTC / NEDC); 37.9 kWh LFP (410 km, CLTC / NEDC)
- Electric range: 203–410 km (126–255 mi) (CLTC); 333–410 km (207–255 mi) (NEDC); 273–337 km (170–209 mi) (WLTP)

Dimensions
- Wheelbase: 2,560 mm (100.8 in)
- Length: 3,950 mm (155.5 in)
- Width: 1,708 mm (67.2 in)
- Height: 1,580 mm (62.2 in)
- Kerb weight: 990–1,185 kg (2,183–2,612 lb)

The Wuling Binguo (Chinese: 五菱缤果; pinyin: Wǔlíng Bīnguǒ), commonly mentioned in English sources as the Wuling Bingo, is a battery electric subcompact car (A0-class in China) manufactured by SAIC-GM-Wuling (SGMW) since 2023 under the Wuling brand.

== Overview ==
Following the success of the Hongguang Mini EV electric microcar, Wuling expanded its range of city cars with a conventional 5-door hatchback called the Binguo.

The Binguo was created for the Chinese domestic market, as a response to other urban electric models. It features retro-inspired styling, distinguished by a round body with oval headlights and rear lamps. The body comes in four colours, three with a contrasting painted roof: white and black, green and black or pink and white, as well as fully black.

The passenger compartment features a similar round-oval design. The dashboard features two displays that function respectively as clocks and the central touch screen of the multimedia system.

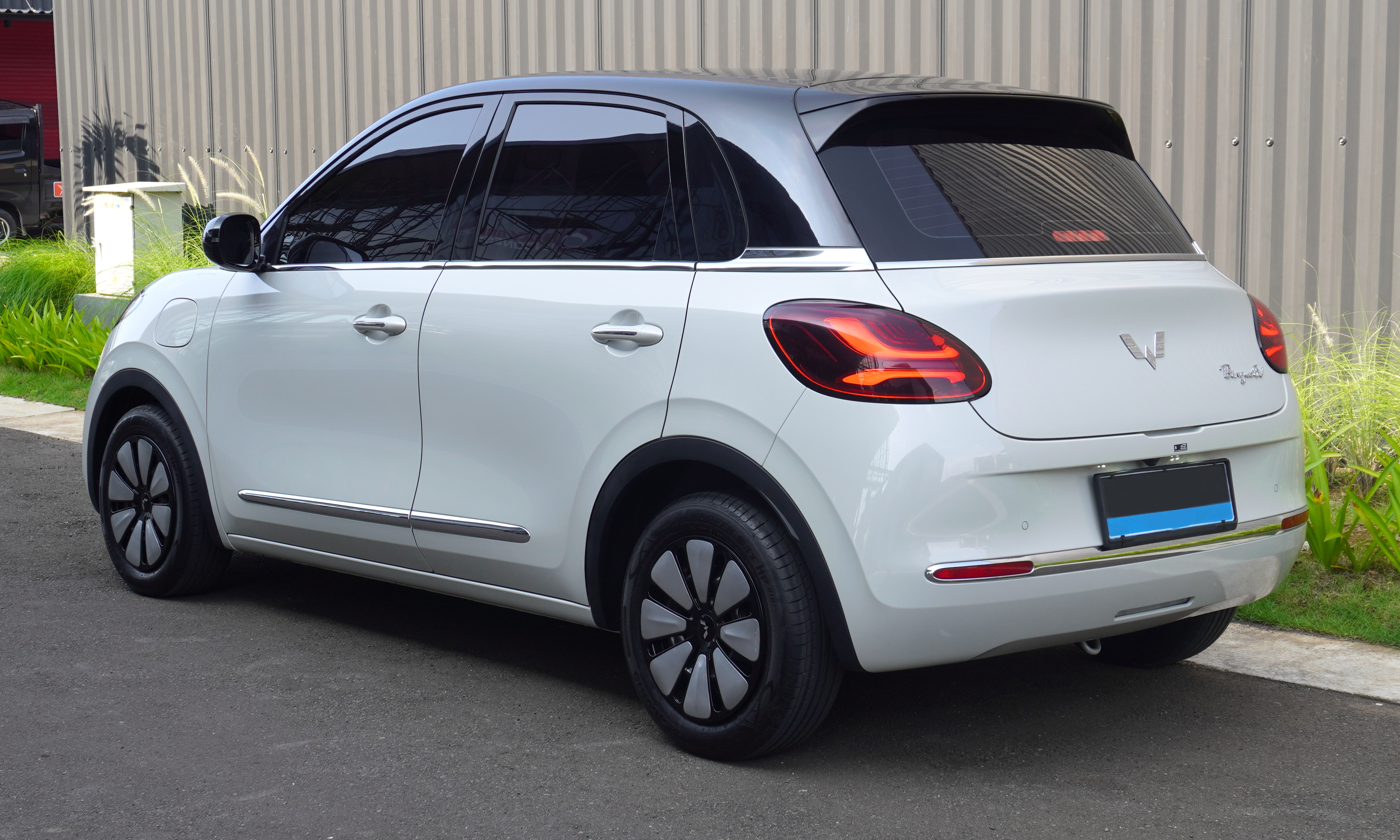
Rear view

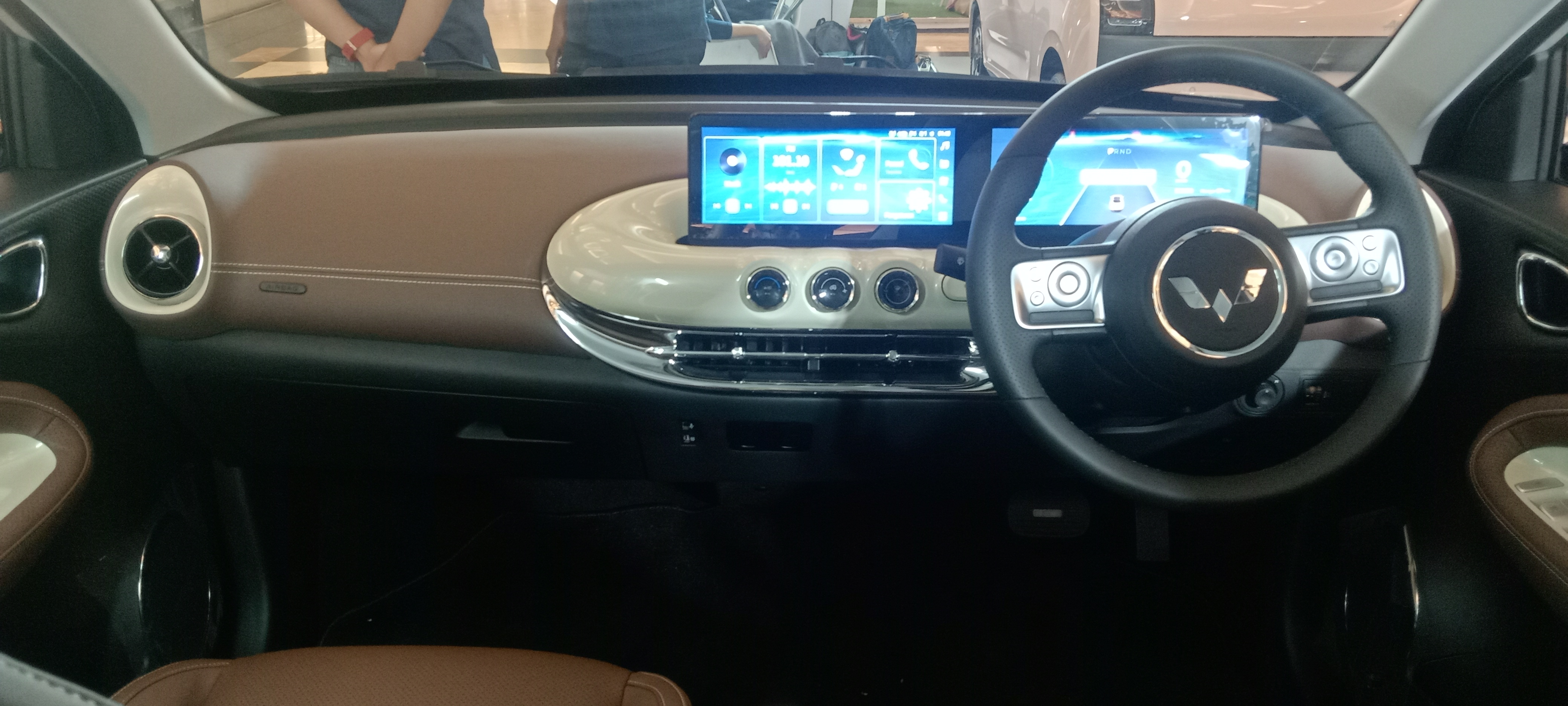
Interior

== Overseas markets ==
=== Brazil ===
In 2026, General Motors confirmed that the Wuling Bingo would commence being assembled in PACE Horizonte Ceará for the local market.

=== Indonesia ===
The Binguo was introduced in Indonesia on 16 November 2023 as the first country to market the Binguo outside China, with sales later commenced on 15 December 2023. In Indonesia, it is available with two variants, powered by 31.9 kWh (333 km) and 37.9 kWh (410 km) battery packs.

In July 2025, the Binguo was updated in Indonesia with new exterior colours and new features. Two variants are available: Lite and Pro, powered by the 31.9 kWh (333 km) battery pack.

=== Malaysia ===
The TQ Bingo was launched in Malaysia on 17 December 2025, by distributor Tan Chong Motor (TCM). In Malaysia, it is available with two variants, Pro (31.9 kWh) and Max (37.9 kWh).

=== Pakistan ===
The Binguo, rebadged by MG, debuted in 2025 as the MG Binguo EV.

=== Thailand ===
The Binguo was launched in Thailand on 8 July 2024, by distributor EV Primus. Initially imported from Indonesia, it is available with two variants powered by the 31.9 kWh (333 km) battery pack. Local assembly for the Thai-market commenced in June 2025 at the Laem Chabang plant. In November 2025, the Binguo was updated in Thailand with new exterior colours, new interior upholsteries and new features. Two variants are available: Lite and Pro, powered by the 31.9 kWh (333 km) battery pack.

=== Vietnam ===
The Bingo was launched in Vietnam on 16 October 2026, with three variants: Base (31.9 kWh), Plus (31.9 kWh) and Max (38 kWh).

== Specifications ==
The Binguo is available with two powertrain variants. The basic version develops 30 kW (40 hp; 41 PS), while the more powerful 50 kW (67 hp; 68 PS), although the top speed of both is limited to 100 km/h (62 mph). The manufacturer has also provided two available sets of batteries: the smaller 17.3 kWh allows the user to drive up to 203 km (126 mi) on a single charge according to the NEDC cycle, and the larger 31.9 kWh up to 333 km (207 mi).

In September 2023, Wuling released the 410 km (255 mi) range version of the Binguo, powered by a 37.9 kWh LFP battery.

== Sales ==
| Year | China | Indonesia | Thailand | Total production |
|---|---|---|---|---|
| 2023 | 167,764 | 1,393 | | 233,735 |
| 2024 | 210,374 | 5,156 | 221 | 191,298 |
| 2025 | 129,987 | 4,213 | 603 | 136,213 |
