= Gambling in Mexico =

Industry in Mexico

Gaming or gambling is a permitted activity in Mexico, subject to the obtaining of the corresponding governmental authorization to conduct gaming activities from the Mexican competent authority. Gambling is an activity subject to scope or attributions of the federal government and legislation, and not to those of a state or local level; with the exception of gaming tax issue. A TGM Research survey shows that 65% people in Mexico took some gambling activities (inc. sports betting) in 2022.

Pursuant to Section X of Article 73 of the Constitution of Mexico, the Federal Legislature enacted the Federal Games and Draws Law (Ley Federal de Juegos y Sorteos), which was published in the Official Gazette of the Federation (Diario Oficial de la Federación) on December 31, 1947, and is in effect since January 5, 1948.

The law had no regulation (reglamento) until September 17, 2004, when the president published one in the Diario Oficial. The Chamber of Deputies challenged it before the Supreme Court in November 2004, arguing that the president had gone beyond the 1947 law, which bans games of chance in general. Under the regulation, the Secretariat of the Interior (SEGOB) issues permits for racetracks, remote betting centers (centros de apuestas remotas, i.e. sports books) and number-draw halls; most casinos run as number-draw halls. Permit holders may also take bets by electronic means, and online betting in Mexico rests on this. The 1947 law itself never mentions the internet. The regulation was last amended in November 2023, when gaming machines outside authorized casinos (e.g. in convenience stores and pharmacies) were banned.

The legal gambling age is 18.

== Online gambling ==
There is no separate license for online gambling; betting sites operate as an extension of a land-based permit from SEGOB's Dirección General de Juegos y Sorteos (DGJS). As of September 2025 there were between 30 and 35 licensed online operators with ".mx" domains. Caliente is by far the largest; in the first quarter of 2026 it took an estimated 45.6% of the online market's revenue.

As of January 1, 2026, the special tax on production and services (IEPS) on gambling went up from 30 to 50 percent. The tax now also applies to online platforms, even those run from abroad.

In November 2025 the Financial Intelligence Unit (UIF) had 13 casinos and betting sites blocked over suspected money laundering. Two of them were Bet365.mx and Betano.mx, the Mexican sites of Bet365 and Betano, run by subsidiaries of TV Azteca (Grupo Salinas). In March 2026 a federal judge granted the TV Azteca subsidiary an amparo and ordered SEGOB to let both sites reopen, but the government appealed, and as of June 2026 they were still down.

== See also ==
- National Lottery for Public Assistance
