= Grupo Caliente =

Betting and casino company in Latin America

- Industry: Casinos, sports betting
- Founded: 1916 in Tijuana, Mexico
- Headquarters: Mexico
- Areas served: Mexico, Austria, Brazil, Ecuador, Panama, Paraguay, Peru, Uruguay, Venezuela, the Caribbean
- Products: Casinos, sports betting
- Owner: Jorge Alberto Hank Rhon
- Divisions: Caliente Casino, Globalsat, Caliente Estadio, Caliente Online
- Website: calientecasino.com.mx

Grupo Caliente is one of the largest sports betting companies in Mexico. In 2021, Grupo Caliente owned around 200 "off-track betting and bookmaking outlets" in Mexico, Austria, Brazil, Ecuador, Panama, Paraguay, Peru, Uruguay, Venezuela and the Caribbean. Business divisions of Grupo Caliente include Globalsat, Estadio Caliente, Caliente Online, and Caliente Casino. Owned by Caliente Baja California, Caliente Casino is a chain of casinos operating mainly in the state of Baja California, Mexico, where it is the exclusive operator of casinos in Tijuana.

== History ==
The company Grupo Caliente was first formed in 1916 when the early version of the Agua Caliente Racetrack was built in Tijuana. In 1998, Caliente began to diversify with the Spanish Codere Group. Bingo was introduced, then electronic game terminals, with 900 installed at the Agua Caliente Racetrack. In 2014, the Desert Sun reported that "the Agua Caliente Casino and Resort in Tijuana, founded... in 1928, is thriving with customers from Southern California." In 2015, the dog racing circuit was one of 20 tracks in seven US states and Tijuana - it was the lowest ranked track on the circuit, and the only location in Mexico. At the time, it had 375 dogs, down from 1,000 at its zenith.

The company has collaborated with Euro Games Technology on electronic gaming lounges at the Hipódromo de Agua Caliente, opened in 2019. In 2021, some Caliente Casino machines were closed temporarily over debt to the city council in Ensenada. As of 2022, owner of Casino Caliente was Jorge Alberto Hank Rhon, and it was the "biggest sports betting company in Mexico." The company still operated Caliente Stadium in Tijuana with 13,333 seats at its opening. A one-time mayor of Tijuana, in January 2021, he started a campaign for governor of Baja California. At that time, Grupo Caliente and Ponce's corporation owned around 200 "off-track betting and bookmaking outlets throughout Mexico, Austria, Brazil, Equador [sic], Panama, Paraguay, Peru, Uruguay, Venezuela and the Caribbean."

== Online betting ==
In March 2012 Caliente signed a software deal with the British supplier Playtech, which paid for the online project in return for a share of the profits; caliente.mx went live around 2014. The site is run by Tecnología en Entretenimiento Caliplay under SEGOB permit DGG/SP/404/97. In 2019 the company said it had about 4 million registered online users and half of Mexico's legal online market, then worth about US$400 million; online already brought in 45% of the group's betting revenue. Forbes México put its share at 51% in 2021.

Caliente is still by far the biggest online operator in Mexico. Analytics firm Blask estimated that in the first quarter of 2026 it took in about US$240 million, 45.6% of the online market's revenue, although it brought in only about 22% of the market's new customers. Its new-customer numbers were down 3.1% on a year earlier, but it made more money per player than any rival.

Caliplay and Playtech fell out in 2023 over Playtech's service fees, with lawsuits in both Mexico and England. They settled in September 2024: Playtech recovered more than €150 million in unpaid fees, kept a 30.8% stake in the new holding company, Caliente Interactive, and stayed lead supplier until 2032. Caliente.mx has been the official betting house of Liga MX since 2020, and in 2023 it signed a four-year sponsorship of the national team.

== Divisions ==
Business divisions of Grupo Caliente include Caliente Casino, Globalsat, Caliente Estadio, and Caliente Online.

Related companies listed on the website included ViajesPetra, Hotel Pueblo Amigo, Colegio Aleman, Caliente Club Canofilo, Caliente Jockey Club, Pueblo Amigo Shopping Center, Colegio Alemán Cuauhtémoc Hank, Pueblo Amigo, and the International Zoological Park.

== Casino locations ==
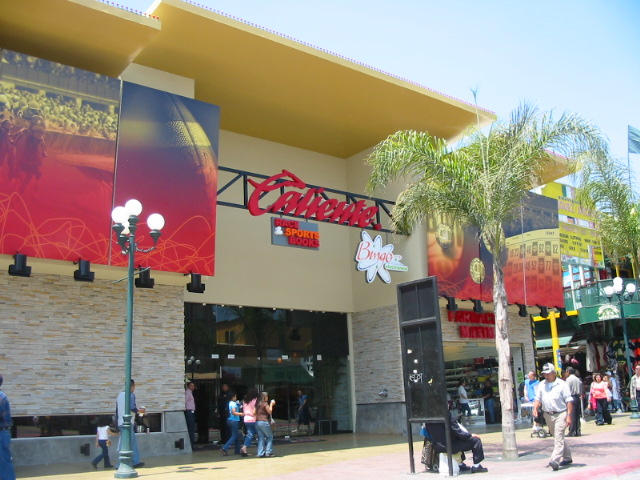
A branch of Caliente casinos on Avenida Revolución, Downtown Tijuana

As of April 2020 its website listed 45 casino locations in Baja California state (23 in Tijuana, also in Rosarito, Tecate, Mexicali and Ensenada), Nogales, Sonora, Morelia, Michoacán and Greater Mexico City. Caliente Casino is the exclusive operator of casinos in Tijuana and operates 23 locations in that city, some of which are frequented by visitors from the United States.

With the boost from the online casino platform developed in 2014, Caliente Casino is now serving not only customers in Mexico but also expanding to Latin American countries and neighboring nations like Colombia, Argentina, and Chile, as well as the Mexican community worldwide.

The company's main branch in Tijuana, Caliente Hipódromo, contains the Agua Caliente Racetrack. The primary Caliente Casino facility in Tijuana has 340 rooms, golf games, a nightclub, and a spa, along with the casino itself and horse and dog racing.

== Teams ==
Grupo Caliente owned sport teams include:

- Club Tijuana
- Club Tijuana (women)
- Dorados de Sinaloa
- Caliente de Durango
- O'Higgins

== See also ==
- Gambling in Mexico
- Mexican Football Federation
