= United States v. Scheinberg =

U.S. federal criminal case against the founders of 3 online poker companies

- Court: United States District Court for the Southern District of New York
- Full case name: United States v. Isai Scheinberg, et al.
- Decided: April 15, 2011 (indictment unsealed)
- Docket nos.: 1:10-cr-00336

Case history
- Subsequent action: see below
- Related actions: United States v. PokerStars, et al., 11 Civ. 2564 (2011)

United States v. Scheinberg, No. 1:10-cr-00336 (2011), is a United States federal criminal case against the founders of the three largest online poker companies, PokerStars, Full Tilt Poker and Cereus (Absolute Poker/Ultimatebet), and a handful of their associates, which alleges that the defendants violated the Unlawful Internet Gambling Enforcement Act (UIGEA) and engaged in bank fraud and money laundering to process transfers to and from their customers. A companion civil case, United States v. Pokerstars, et al., 11 Civ. 2564 (2011), included Full Tilt and Cereus (Absolute Poker), Ultimate Bet, Oldford Group, Rational Entertainment Enterprises, and many others as defendants and sought the recovery of forfeiture equalling approximately $3 billion in assets belonging to the companies. After the indictment was unsealed on April 15, 2011, a date quickly dubbed Black Friday by the online poker community, PokerStars and Full Tilt stopped offering real money play to their United States customers.

Three years after the start of the poker boom in 2003, the U.S. Congress passed UIGEA to extend existing gambling laws into cyberspace. The law made processing payments for illegal online gambling a crime; however, the defendant companies remained in the U.S. market in the belief that the law did not cover poker. A former payment processor for the companies turned state's evidence after initially being charged with violating UIGEA himself. On September 20, the civil suit was amended claiming individual fraud by Howard Lederer, Chris Ferguson, and Rafael Furst.

On April 15, 2011, the U.S. Department of Justice seized the .com internet addresses of the three online gambling sites, replacing them with a takedown notice. On April 20, 2011, the U.S. Attorney's office returned the Pokerstars.com domain to the company, facilitating the withdrawal of U.S. players' funds. About 76 bank accounts in 14 countries were frozen, including an unknown amount of player funds. Prosecutors demanded prison for 11 defendants, including website founders, U.S. payment processors, and a Utah bank executive, for a complex fraud scheme circumventing UIGEA banking laws. In response, Antigua and Barbuda weighed WTO action. The implicated firms stopped U.S. ads, leading to the cancellation of poker TV shows. Full Tilt's eGambling license was suspended in June, stopping all online activities, and permanently revoked by the Alderney Gambling Control Commission on September 29.

On July 31, 2012, the US government dismissed "with prejudice" all civil complaints against all PokerStars and Full Tilt Poker companies after coming to a settlement with PokerStars which includes PokerStars purchasing Full Tilt. PokerStars and Full Tilt admitted no wrongdoing as part of the settlement, which ends all litigation between the government and the poker companies. The U.S. Government recognized that both companies are eligible to apply for licenses to conduct online gaming in the U.S., contingent upon the provision of a legal structure for such licensing. The prosecutions led to guilty pleas from most of the eleven defendants, but the site principals avoided significant prison time; Full Tilt CEO Raymond Bitar was sentenced to time served, and PokerStars founder Isai Scheinberg, the last defendant to resolve his case, was fined $30,000 with no prison time in 2020.

This case had significant implications for the online poker industry and prompted discussions about the regulation of online gambling in the United States.

== Background ==
=== Growth of poker ===
In 2003, ESPN expanded its coverage of the World Series of Poker. Between 2003 and 2006, the number of contestants in the $10,000 No Limit Texas hold'em Main Event grew from 839 to 8773. After the UIGEA was passed, the World Series of Poker main event decreased in size, to 6358 players in 2007. In 2015, 6420 players participated.

=== Changes in gambling laws ===
On October 13, 2006, the United States Congress passed Unlawful Internet Gambling Enforcement Act of 2006 (UIGEA), which makes it a federal offense, punishable by up to five years in prison, for a gambling business to "knowingly accept" payments "in connection with the participation of another person in unlawful Internet gambling." However, according to syndicated columnist Jacob Sullum, the law did not define or alter the definition of unlawful gambling, which under Federal law only applies to sports betting via the Wire Act.

Nevertheless, Party Poker, at the time the largest provider for U.S. demand, decided to withdraw from servicing the United States poker market. The United States Department of Justice later indicted them for services provided prior to 2006 in violation of the Wire Act, a case they settled out of court in the hopes of being allowed to serve the U.S. market at a later date. Also in 2006, several other online poker service providers withdrew from the market, including Sportingbet's Paradise Poker, 888 Holdings' Pacific Poker, and the iPoker Network's CD Poker.

Several other sites continued to facilitate the demand for online poker in the U.S., which had been growing about 20% per year.

A 2006 law passed in Washington state that made it a felony to play online poker was upheld as constitutional by the Washington Supreme Court in September 2010. PokerStars immediately withdrew from Washington's market, and Full Tilt soon followed suit, but both sites continued to provide services to players in the other 49 U.S. states.

This case was preceded by a 2009 seizure of $34 million worth of winnings in transit U.S. poker players (q.v. Southern District of New York action against online poker players).

=== Basis for the case ===
Since Federal law says nothing specifically about online poker, or any gambling other than sports betting, Preet Bharara, the U.S. Attorney for the Southern District of New York, bases his case on a New York law that makes it a Class A misdemeanor, punishable by up to a year in prison, to run a game of chance where bets are placed within the state. Although none of the sites are actually run out of New York (PokerStars is based on the Isle of Man, Full Tilt Poker is in Ireland and Absolute Poker is from Costa Rica), he was able to obtain a felony indictment for UIGEA violations. In addition to the 2006 UIGEA, the defendants were charged with violating the Illegal Gambling Business Act (18 USC 1955).

Additionally, in April 2010, the former head of Intabill, a defunct payment processor in Australia, Daniel Tzvetkoff, was arrested in Las Vegas by the FBI. He was charged with money laundering, bank fraud, and wire fraud. PokerStars and Full Tilt had previously claimed that Tzvetkoff cheated them out of at least $100 million. However, he was quietly let go a few months later in August 2010. He reportedly turned state's evidence after being threatened with a 75-year prison sentence for alleged UIGEA violations.

The indictment also alleged that the executive officers of the sites had sought investment in SunFirst Bank in Utah, which they were using to obtain and pay out player funds by allegedly mis-coding transactions. Although no one was actually being defrauded per se, and money from an otherwise legal operation cannot be "laundered", these actions formed the basis for the fraud and money laundering charges. This case marks only the second time that the Department of Justice has alleged violations of the UIGEA, after the indictment of Daniel Tzvetkoff.

A grand jury handed down a sealed indictment on March 10, 2011.

== Domain name seizure ==
United States Department of Justice website seizure notice

Online poker was suspended on April 15 at the top three United States websites (In order, PokerStars, Full Tilt Poker and Cereus Poker Network) and continues to be suspended at the top two.

On April 15, 2011, the United States Attorney in New York seized and shut down defendants' domains which included Pokerstars.com, Fulltiltpoker.com, Absolutepoker.com, Ultimatebet.com and UB.com.

On April 20, 2011, the office of the U.S. Attorney reinstated the control of the domain name Pokerstars.com back to the company. This action was taken to enable the withdrawal of funds held in accounts by U.S. players with the companies.

In July 2012, the government reached settlements with PokerStars and Full Tilt and dismissed civil complaints "with prejudice" against the two companies. Both companies admitted no wrongdoing. The U.S. Government recognized that both companies are eligible to apply for licenses to conduct online gaming in the U.S., contingent upon the provision of a legal structure for such licensing.

== Accounts seized ==
About 76 bank accounts in 14 countries were then frozen, preventing players from accessing balances held by the companies, according to the FBI's New York office. That Full Tilt and Pokerstars accepted a total of $500 million in total player deposits is a conservative estimate.

== Persons indicted ==
The indictment named eleven individuals who were each charged with four crimes, including Raymond Bitar, CEO of TiltWare - software company for Full Tilt Poker, Isai Scheinberg, founder of PokerStars, Scott Tom, part owner of Absolute Poker, John Campos, Vice chairman of the board and part-owner of SunFirst Bank and others.

The prosecutors were seeking jail sentences for the indicted executives and $3 billion from the poker companies. When the U.S. Department of Justice pursued Party Poker in 2006, it led to a $300 million plea agreement by PartyGaming co-founder Anurag Dikshit and a $105 million settlement with the company itself in 2009. In the criminal case, "The maximum penalty for violation of the UIGEA and operating a gambling business is 5 years in prison and a fine of $250,000 or twice the gross gain or loss for each charge, for conspiracy to commit wire fraud is 30 years in prison and a fine of $1 million or twice the gross gain or loss, and for money laundering conspiracy is 20 years in prison and a fine of $500,000 or twice the amount laundered."

== Government position ==
Preet Bharara, the United States Attorney for the Southern District of New York, expressed his view when the indictment was unsealed:

As charged, these defendants concocted an elaborate criminal fraud scheme, alternately tricking some U.S. banks and effectively bribing others to assure the continued flow of billions in illegal gambling profits. Moreover, as we allege, in their zeal to circumvent the gambling laws, the defendants also engaged in massive money laundering and bank fraud. Foreign firms that choose to operate in the United States are not free to flout the laws they don't like simply because they can't bear to be parted from their profits.

FBI Assistant Director-in-Charge Janice K. Fedarcyk added:

These defendants, knowing full well that their business with U.S. customers and U.S. banks was illegal, tried to stack the deck. They lied to banks about the true nature of their business. Then, some of the defendants found banks willing to flout the law for a fee. The defendants bet the house that they could continue their scheme, and they lost.

In the amended complaint the government alleged that "Full Tilt Poker did not maintain funds sufficient to repay all players, and in addition, the company used player funds to pay board members and other owners more than $440 million since April 2007." Furthermore, the amended complaint uses the term ponzi scheme prominently, including in its title.

A lawyer for Ferguson has denied the allegations, suggesting that the issues may have been the result of mismanagement not malice. A lawyer for some of the defendants issued a press release stating that the phrase ponzi scheme was inaccurate, unfair and disingenuous and that its use was counterproductive.

The parties reached a settlement on July 31, 2012, ending all litigation between the government and the PokerStars/Full Tilt companies.

== Player response ==
"Along with everyone else in the poker world, I'm shocked," said Brandon Adams, a poker professional who has appeared in televised tournaments on NBC and ESPN. "The expectation was that there would be warning signs. These sites went from multibillion-dollar enterprises to on the ropes overnight." He added: "Some players have literally millions of dollars in their online poker accounts."

The Poker Players Alliance called upon poker players affected by the shutdown to contact their congressional representatives.

Poker player and then-current U.S. Congressman Barney Frank, in an interview with The Hill, lamented that the Justice Department is more focused on prosecuting online poker sites than those responsible for the subprime mortgage crisis and the 2008 financial crisis.

In an editorial in the Washington Post, poker player and a former three-term U.S. Senator from New York Alfonse D'Amato, a long-time favorite of industry lobbyists, wrote: "This is an attack on Internet poker and American poker players like me. Through these strong-arm tactics, prosecutors think they can ban Internet poker. Instead, they are making millions of Americans victims in an attempt to make online poker illegal without the support of legislators or the public." He called on President Barack Obama to rein in the prosecuting attorneys in the Southern District of New York.

== International response ==
Antigua and Barbuda said US violated global trade laws and considered filing action in WTO. They had successfully won a similar case against US with WTO in response to US prosecution of owners of offshore gambling sites. At the time, online poker was the second largest industry in Antigua's economy. The Alderney Gambling Control Commission (AGCC) also took action against the operators, essentially shutting down operations.

Various sources report that this opened the way for Jack Binion to buy Full Tilt and ensure all Full Tilt Poker players get refunded in the process. On June 30, European investors agreed to provide capital to repay Full Tilt Players in exchange for a majority stake in the company. On July 26, the hearing revealed that Full Tilt owed £250,000 (US$410,000) in overdue licensing fees to the AGCC, which Full Tilt paid within seven days as promised clearing the way for approval of a refinancing deal. The hearing was suspended until no later than September 15 as a result of the revelation. The delay until September 15 offers Full Tilt a chance to complete its negotiated settlement. On September 29, the AGCC stripped Full Tilt of its license. The AGCC's statement said that Full Tilt had misrepresented its financial situation, while Full Tilt said the action would jeopardize its ability to repay its customers.

== Economic impact ==
Prior to the indictments, the United States accounted for 25 to 40% of the poker business for these companies. For PokerStars, the International business share was 70 to 75% and for Full Tilt it was 50 to 60%, according to one source. Darren Rovell cites a source that says the three companies had a 95% market share in online poker in the United States.

The companies combined for an estimated US$200 million in advertising and marketing in the United States and their withdrawal from the U.S. market left network shows such as Poker After Dark and The Big Game without advertising sponsors. On cable television, ESPN's contract with PokerStars was for $22 million. ESPN withdrew its Pokerstars advertising. On April 17, ESPN2 cancelled its scheduled broadcast of the 2011 North American Poker Tour presented by PokerStars.net. On Game Show Network, prepaid episodes of High Stakes Poker continued to air for several months after the event, but the show was in danger of not returning.

The companies accounted for a large proportion of World Series of Poker qualifiers via online satellites. As a result, the 2011 World Series of Poker main event had the highest percentage of foreign players (and lowest percentage of American players) in history with 2,265 foreign players.

Wynn Resorts allied with PokerStars on March 25 to seek the legalization of Internet gambling in the U.S., but terminated the accord on April 15.

U.S. citizens who play online poker for a living effectively lost their livelihoods due to the DOJ action. Pokernews pointed out a thread on the Two Plus Two forums where the PPA asked players to share their stories. Among the poker networks seen as potential destinations for U.S. Poker players looking for a new online home are Carbon Poker and DoylesRoom.

According to Brandon Adams, live poker gambling at casinos might be a short-term beneficiary of the crackdown, but often online and live poker are not competitive but complementary, with players honing their skills in cheap, fast games online before gaining the nerve to play for higher stakes at a casino.

According to Time, the opposition to legalized domestic online gambling is depriving the United States economy from a huge potential source of tax revenues. One political action committee that received approximately $300,000 from PokerStars returned the money.

On April 26, PokerStars began processing cashouts. On May 4, Blanca Gaming of Antigua, the parent company to UB and Absolute Poker who had already laid off 95% of its employees, decided that it would have to pursue bankruptcy. On May 6, Pokerstars augmented their cashout policies to allow players to cashout frequent player points and pro-rata portions of partially earned VIP rewards bonuses.

On May 27, the Department of Justice unfroze an Irish account containing more than one-third of the more than $100 million that was owed to players. The account belonged to Full Tilt and its co-founder, Raymond Bitar. This was one of nine frozen Irish accounts. As of 11 August 2011 Full Tilt Poker had failed to uphold its promise to return U.S. Poker players by May 15, following the April 15 events. As a result, Full Tilt Pro Phil Ivey announced he would not be playing the 2011 World Series of Poker and suing Full Tilt. Ivey voluntarily withdrew the suit on June 30.

== Arrests ==
John Campos and Chad Elie were arrested on Black Friday. Campos is part-owner and vice chairman of the board of directors for SunFirst Bank. On Monday, April 18, Campos, of St. George, Utah, appeared in a Utah court, but did not enter a plea. He was released on $25,000 bond, ordered to surrender his passport and to appear in a New York court for his next appearance. Chad Elie, of Las Vegas, made his first court appearance in Manhattan on Tuesday April 19. He was released on $250,000 bail.

Bradley Franzen made a court appearance in Manhattan on Monday April 18, entering a plea of 'not guilty' to the nine counts listed on his indictment, including bank fraud and money laundering charges. Franzen's bail was set at $200,000, for which his parents' house was used as collateral. Franzen pleaded guilty in a New York court on May 23, 2011. It is not known when he will be sentenced; however, it appears that Franzen struck a plea agreement with prosecutors, in which he agreed to cooperate in the probe, in return for which prosecutors would recommend leniency. Most of the other named defendants were out of the country. Ira Rubin, indicted on illegal gambling, fraud, and money laundering charges was arrested on Monday, April 25, 2011, in Guatemala. He made his initial court appearance in Miami on April 27, and was remanded in custody to his next appearance on April 29.

Ray Bitar surrendered to authorities on July 2, 2012.

Isai Scheinberg surrendered to authorities upon landing in New York on January 17, 2020. Scheinberg surrendered his passports, posted a $1 million bond, and was released with orders to remain in the New York area. He was the last of the 11 original defendants to face his charges in the US. In September 2020, Scheinberg was sentenced to pay a fine of $30,000 with no jail time.

The judge presiding over the case acknowledged the wrongdoings but also recognized the positive actions taken by PokerStars under Scheinberg's leadership. Notably, PokerStars had stepped in to cover the debts of its rivals, Full Tilt and Ultimate Bet/Absolute Poker, ensuring that players received their frozen balances. The light sentence reflected these remedial actions and the broader context of Scheinberg's contributions to the online poker industry.

== Convictions ==
On December 20, 2011, Absolute Poker co-founder Brent Buckley pleaded guilty to misleading banks. The plea deal calls for him to receive a sentence between a year and a year and a half in prison. Sentencing was set for April 19, 2012. Buckley was sentenced to 14 months.

On January 17, 2012, Ira Rubin entered a plea agreement in a Manhattan federal court in front of US Magistrate Judge Gabriel Gorenstein. Rubin agreed to plead guilty to three of the nine counts of conspiracy to commit bank fraud he faced and was expected to be sentenced to 18–24 months of prison. He received a three-year sentence. Judge Kaplan said, "You are an unreformed con man and fraudster," and calling his actions a "brazen" defiance of US law. "A significant sentence is necessary to protect the community."

John Campos pleaded guilty in March 2012 to a single misdemeanor bank gambling charge. He was sentenced in June to three months in prison. During his plea, Campos said his processing of the gambling proceeds for PokerStars and Full Tilt Poker was not in return for a $10 million investment in the bank.
