= Consumer Protection Act =

Consumer Protection Act may refer to:

== United States ==
- Agriculture and Consumer Protection Act of 1973
- Anticybersquatting Consumer Protection Act, 1999
- Bankruptcy Abuse Prevention and Consumer Protection Act, 2005
- Consumer Credit Protection Act, 1968
- Dodd–Frank Wall Street Reform and Consumer Protection Act, 2010
- Internet Gambling Regulation, Consumer Protection, and Enforcement Act, 2009
- Telephone Consumer Protection Act of 1991

== Other ==
- Consumer Protection Act 1987, United Kingdom
- Consumer Protection Act (Quebec), Canada
- Consumer Protection Act, 1986, India
- Consumer Protection Act, 2019, India
