= Online gambling =

Gambling done through the internet

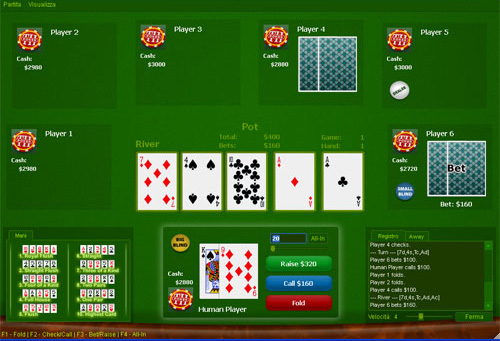
An online poker game

Online gambling (also known as iGaming or iGambling) is any kind of gambling conducted on the internet. This includes virtual poker, casinos, and sports betting. The first online gambling venue opened to the general public was ticketing for the Liechtenstein International Lottery in October 1994. Today, the market is worth around $40 billion globally each year, according to various estimates.

Many countries restrict or ban online gambling. However, it is legal in some states of the United States, some provinces in Canada, most countries in the European Union, and several nations in the Caribbean.

In many legal markets, online gambling service providers are required by law to have some form of license to provide services or advertise to residents there. Examples of such authorities include the United Kingdom Gambling Commission or the Pennsylvania Gaming Control Board in the US.

Many online casinos and gambling companies around the world choose to base themselves in tax havens near their main markets. These destinations include Gibraltar, Malta, and Alderney in Europe. In Asia, online gambling is legal in the Philippines with the Philippine Amusement & Gaming Corporation or PAGCOR as the regulator while the Special Administrative Region of Macau was long considered a tax haven and known base for gambling operators in the region. However, in 2018, the EU removed Macau from their list of blacklisted tax havens.

== History ==
In 1994, Antigua and Barbuda passed the Free Trade & Processing Act, allowing licences to be granted to organisations applying to open online casinos. Before online casinos, the first fully functional gambling software was developed by Microgaming, an Isle of Man-based software company. This was secured with software developed by CryptoLogic, an online security software company. Safe transactions became viable; this led to the first online casinos in 1994.

1996 saw the establishment of the Kahnawake Gaming Commission, which regulated online gaming activity from the Mohawk Territory of Kahnawake and issues gaming licences to many of the world's online casinos and poker rooms. This is an attempt to keep the operations of licensed online gambling organisations fair and transparent.

In the late 1990s, online gambling gained popularity; there were only 15 gambling websites in 1996, but that had increased to 200 websites by the following year. A report published by Frost & Sullivan revealed that online gambling revenues had exceeded $830 million in 1998 alone. In the same year, the first online poker rooms were introduced. Soon afterward in 1999, the Internet Gambling Prohibition Act was introduced as a bill in the US Senate; it would have meant that a company could not offer any online gambling product to any US citizen. But it did not pass. Multiplayer online gambling was also introduced in 1999.

In 2000, the first Australian federal government passed the Interactive Gambling Moratorium Act, making it illegal for any online casino not licensed and operating before May 2000 to operate. This meant Lasseter's Online became the only online casino able to operate legally in Australia; however, they cannot take bets from Australian citizens.

By 2001, the estimated number of people who had participated in online gambling rose to eight million, and growth continued, despite continuing legal challenges to online gambling.

In 2008, H2 Gambling Capital estimated worldwide online gambling revenue at $21 billion.

In 2016, Statista predicted that the online gambling market would reach $45.86 billion, growing to $56.05 billion by 2018.

In 2022, online streaming platform Twitch banned popular gambling streams from their site. Cryptocurrency casino operators like Stake.com had been sponsoring streamers broadcasts of their live gambling sessions for several years.

== Forms ==
The internet has allowed new types of gambling to be available online. Improvements in technology have changed betting habits just as video lottery terminals, keno, and scratchcards changed the gambling industry in the 20th century.

Gambling has become one of the most popular and lucrative businesses on the internet. In 2007 the UK Gambling Commission stated that the gambling industry had achieved a turnover of over £84 billion. This is partly due to the wide range of gambling options available to many different types of people. An article by Darren R. Christensen, Nicki A. Dowling, Alun C. Jackson, and Shane A. Thomas said that a survey recorded in Australia showed that the most common forms of gambling were lotteries (46.5%), keno (24.3%), instant scratch tickets (24.3%), and electronic gaming machines (20.5%). Online gambling sites also started to hire celebrities as their brand ambassadors, such as Mike Tyson, Cristiano Ronaldo, Conor McGregor, and Peter Crouch.

=== Poker ===
Online poker tables commonly offer Texas hold 'em, Omaha hold 'em, seven-card stud, razz, HORSE, and other game types in both tournament and cash game structures. Players play against each other rather than the "house", with the card room making its money through "rake" and through tournament fees.

=== Casinos ===
There are a large number of online casinos in which people can play casino games such as roulette, blackjack, pachinko, baccarat, and many others. These games are played against the "house" which makes money because the odds are in its favor.

=== Sweepstakes online casinos ===
Sweepstakes online casinos represent an alternative approach to online gambling, providing a platform for casino-style gaming within jurisdictions where traditional online gambling faces legal constraints. These platforms are characterized by a sweepstakes model, differentiating them from standard online casinos by enabling users to participate in gaming without directly wagering real money.

The operation of sweepstakes casinos is facilitated through a dual currency system. This system comprises "Gold Coins" for recreational gaming, which possess no real-world value, and "Sweepstakes Coins," which are employed in contests that offer participants the chance to win actual monetary prizes. This model is designed to comply with the sweepstakes laws in the United States, but critics argue that it merely exploits a loophole.

=== Sports betting ===
Sports betting is the activity of predicting sports results and placing a wager on the outcome. Usually, the wager is in the form of money.

Many online sports betting websites offer in-play gambling, which is a feature that allows the user to bet while the event is in progress. A benefit of live in-play gambling is that there are much more markets. For example, in Association football a user could bet on which player will receive the next Yellow card, or which team will be awarded the next corner kick.

=== Bingo ===
Online bingo is the game of bingo (US|UK) played on the internet.

=== Lotteries ===
Most lotteries are run by governments and are heavily protected from competition due to their ability to generate large taxable cash flows. The first online lotteries were run by private individuals or companies and licensed to operate by small countries. Most private online lotteries have stopped trading as governments have passed new laws giving themselves and their own lotteries greater protection. Government-controlled lotteries now offer their games online.

==== UK National Lottery ====
The National Lottery was started in 1994 and is operated by the Camelot Group. Around 70% of UK adults play the National Lottery regularly, making the average annual sales over £5 billion apart from the year 2000–2001 where sales dropped just below that. In its first 17 years, it has created over 2,800 millionaires.

In 2002, Camelot decided to rebrand the National Lottery main draw after falling ticket sales. The name National Lottery was kept as the general name for the organisation and the main draw was renamed Lotto. The advertising campaign for the new Lotto cost £72 million which included ten television advertisements featuring Scottish comedian Billy Connolly and one of the largest ever poster campaigns. The new brand and name had the slogan:

Don't live a little, live a Lotto

=== Horse racing betting ===
Horse racing betting comprises a significant percentage of online gambling wagers and all major Internet bookmakers, betting exchanges, and sports books offer a wide variety of horse racing betting markets.

Horse wagering using online methods across state lines is legal in several states in the United States. In 2006, the NTRA and various religious organizations lobbied in support of an act in Congress meant to limit online gambling. Some critics of the bill argued that the exemption of horse racing wagering was an unfair loophole. In response, the NTRA responded that the exemption was "a recognition of existing federal law", not a new development. Interstate wagering on horse racing was first made legal under the Interstate Horseracing Act written in 1978. The bill was rewritten in the early 2000s to include the Internet in closed-circuit websites, including simulcast racing, as compared to simply phones or other forms of communication.

=== Mobile gambling ===
Mobile gambling refers to playing games of chance or skill for money by using a remote device such as a tablet computer, smartphone or a mobile phone with a wireless Internet connection.

=== Advance-deposit wagering ===
Advance-deposit wagering (ADW) is a form of gambling on the outcome of horse races in which the bettor must fund their account before being allowed to place bets. ADW is often conducted online or by phone. In contrast to ADW, credit shops allow wagers without advance funding; accounts are settled at month-end. Racetrack owners, horse trainers and state governments sometimes receive a share of ADW revenues.

=== Virtual sports ===
Virtual Sports are electronic games that generate visual feedback on a display device. The term "virtual sports" is often used to describe software simulations of sports used for betting purposes. Some betting house and racinos use this kind of software because clients use to bet more than with the normal sports.

== Funds transfers ==
The money for online gambling can come from credit card, electronic check, certified check, money order, wire transfer, or cryptocurrencies. Normally, gamblers upload funds to the online gambling company, make bets or play the games that it offers, and then cash out any winnings. Gamblers can often fund gambling accounts by credit card or debit card, and cash out winnings directly back to the card; most U.S. banks, however, prohibit the use of their cards for the purpose of Internet gambling, and attempts by Americans to use credit cards at Internet gambling sites are usually rejected. A number of electronic money services offer accounts with which online gambling can be funded.

== Legal status ==
=== Argentina ===
While casinos are regulated and not penalized in Argentina, online apps that emulate online casinos work differently. Although these online casinos are not illegal in Argentina, its regulation is controlled by provincial jurisdiction as there is no federal law that prohibits online gambling. This means that, as opposed to some other countries in the world that have a federal law to regulate this practice, each of the 23 provinces and Ciudad Autónoma de Buenos Aires in Argentina are able to take their own measures and pass their own legislation when it comes to online gambling. which also forces users to stay informed about what is happening at provincial level.

Even though there was an attempt by Argentinian provinces to work towards the regulation of online gaming, there was no major progress in its development. Therefore, the need for a federal law arises. Although regulation will not put an end to the illegal operation of some platforms and websites, it will make a significant difference by blocking accounts tied to underground gambling.

In response to the growing concern for the rise in online gambling in Argentina among young people, the Unión por la Patria bloc of councilors are moving forward to present a project to the Honorable Concejo Deliberante in Buenos Aires, calling for "campaigns in secondary schools aimed at young people and families, involving professionals, experts in addictions and mental health, as well as the educational community."

==== Buenos Aires ====
In 2018, Buenos Aires was the first province in Argentina to pass its own law, No. 15079, that approved the legal operation of online casinos in the province and, up to 2021, it was the only province in Argentina to set forth the regulation of online gaming. Authorities agree that revising and modernizing the laws that are imposed on online casinos will combat illegal gambling, both for the safety of users and the transparency of operations. The regulation allows only individuals or legal entities holding a license issued by the Provincial Institute of Lotteries and Casinos, a public authority overseeing gambling, to participate in online games and bets.

In Buenos Aires, there are now two entities in charge of monitoring and providing licenses after careful inspection to anyone who wishes to bet: The Provincial Lottery (Buenos Aires) and the Buenos Aires Lottery (LOTBA). The Provincial Lottery is concerned with regulating lottery games in Buenos Aires and throughout the province, whereas "the Buenos Aires Lottery is a major body in the online gambling sector." This body is concerned with promoting measures in favour of "responsible gaming" as well as " allowing game providers to present their games to online casinos operating under its license".

==== Córdoba ====
In 2021, the Bill No. 34270 was passed and established the regulation of online gambling activities in the province of Córdoba. The legislators that proposed this law were Orlando Arduh, Silvia Paleo, Darío Capitani, Raúl Recalde and Alberto Ambrosio. The bill became law No. 10793 after legislators noticed the urgent need for regulation in online gambling. The legislator Silvia Paleo spoke about this law and said that new legislation is "the only possible step towards responsible gambling" and also that it is the "responsibility of the State" to make gambling secure.

The aim of Law No. 10793 is "to regulate online gaming (...) with the purpose of guaranteeing public order, eradicating illegal gaming and safeguarding the rights of those who participate in them" including casino games, sports betting and lotteries.

In the province of Córdoba, the Córdoba Lottery is the body in charge of granting licenses, supervising all gambling operations and protecting players. In 2023, four online gambling platforms were granted a license to start operating for a 45-day trial period. The platforms Boldt, Betsson, PlayCet and Jugadón received these licenses which are granted for 15 years and are non-renewable. As required by law, platforms that get a license in Córdoba must pay a monthly fee of 10% of the gross proceeds and the money is used to fund social programs in the province.

=== Antigua and Barbuda ===
Many of the companies operating out of the island nation of Antigua and Barbuda are publicly traded on various stock exchanges, specifically the London Stock Exchange. Antigua has met British regulatory standards and has been added to the UK's "white list", which allows licensed Antiguan companies to advertise in the UK.

The national government, which licenses Internet gambling entities, made a complaint to the World Trade Organization about the U.S. government's actions to impede online gaming. The Caribbean country won the preliminary ruling but WTO's appeals body somewhat narrowed that favorable ruling in April 2005. The appeals decision held that various state laws argued by Antigua and Barbuda to be contrary to the WTO agreements were not sufficiently discussed during the course of the proceedings to be properly assessed by the panel. However, the appeals panel also ruled that the Wire Act and two other federal statutes prohibiting the provision of gambling services from Antigua to the United States violated the WTO's General Agreement on Trade in Services. Although the United States convinced the appeals panel that these laws were "necessary" to protect public health and morals, the asserted United States defense on these grounds was ultimately rejected because its laws relating to remote gambling on horse-racing were not applied equally to foreign and domestic online betting companies, and thus the United States could not establish that its laws were non-discriminatory.

On 30 March 2007, the WTO confirmed that the U.S. "had done nothing to abide by an earlier verdict that labeled some U.S. Internet gambling restrictions as illegal."

On 19 June 2007, Antigua and Barbuda filed a claim with the WTO for US$3.4 billion in trade sanctions against the United States, and in particular, the ability for the country to suspend its enforcement of U.S. copyrights and patents and a punitive measure. On 28 January 2013, the WTO authorized the ability for Antigua and Bermuda to monetize and exploit U.S. copyrights as compensation for the country's actions; the country planned to form "a statutory body to own, manage and operate the ultimate platform to be created for the monetisation or other exploitation of the suspension of American intellectual property rights".

=== Australia ===
On 28 June 2001 the Australian Government passed the Interactive Gambling Act 2001 (IGA). The government said that the IGA was important to protect Australians from the harmful effects of gambling. The offense applies to all interactive gambling service providers, whether based in Australia or offshore, whether Australian or foreign owned. The IGA makes it an offence to provide an interactive gambling service to a customer physically present in Australia, but it is not an offence for Australian residents to play poker or casino games online. Sports betting online is legal in Australia, with many state government licensed sportsbooks in operation.

=== Bangladesh ===
Gambling in Bangladesh is illegal. Online gambling busts are frequently conducted. Related laws include: The Public Gambling Act (1867), Money laundering, the Foreign Currency Act, Digital Security Act. However, comprehensive laws regarding online gambling is lacking. In some regions cable TV is blocked to curtail online sports betting.

In August 2022, national cricketer Shakib Al Hasan was accused of promoting gambling sites. Shakib cancelled the contract after pressure from the public and Bangladesh Cricket Board.

=== Belarus ===
Online gambling was legalized in Belarus in 2018 through Presidential Decree No. 305, with licensed operations allowed from April 2019. The legislation mandates integration with a state monitoring system, centralized payment processing, and strict compliance controls. Licenses and taxation are overseen by the Ministry of Taxes and Duties.

=== Bosnia and Herzegovina ===
Online gambling is legal in Bosnia and Herzegovina but regulated separately by each of its entities. In the Federation of Bosnia and Herzegovina, only land-based operators may apply for online betting licenses under the 2015 Law on Games of Chance. In Republika Srpska, a more extensive online framework was adopted in 2019, allowing licensed online casinos and betting platforms, with licensing and taxation overseen by the Republic Administration for Games of Chance. The Brčko District permits only land-based gambling under its own 2022 law. All jurisdictions require licensed software, age verification, and responsible gambling measures, though enforcement and harmonization remain inconsistent across the country.

=== Canada ===
The criminal code of Canada prohibits any type of gambling at an establishment not owned or licensed by a provincial government. Not withstanding this fact, there are an estimated 1,200 to 1,400 offshore websites that make casino type games and other gambling activities available to Canadians. For online gambling operations within Canada's borders, Canadian authorities are willing to prosecute, but have only done so once, when British Columbia prosecuted Starnet Communications International ("SCI"), a Delaware corporation, run by residents of Vancouver, where one of the company's servers was located. The court found that SCI had sufficient contact with Canada to be prosecuted under its criminal code. SCI was fined $100,000 and forfeited nearly $4 million in profits. It has since moved its operations overseas.

According to John A. Cunningham, Joanne Cordingley, David C. Hodgins and Tony Toneatto a telephone survey was recorded in Ontario that shows there was a strong agreement that conceptions of gambling abuse as a disease or addiction were positively associated with belief that treatment is needed, while there was a strong agreement that disease or wrongdoing was positively associated with the credit that abstinence is required. A survey conducted in 2007 showed that about 2.3% of Canadians reported participating in online gambling. In 2012, Manitoba lotteries minister Steve Ashton estimated that gamblers in Manitoba alone were spending $37 million a year at unlicensed online casinos.

In the 2010s, provincial lottery and gaming boards began to gradually launch online casinos; they are intended to compete primarily with unregulated services that are not licensed to operate in Canada. The British Columbia Lottery Corporation (BCLC) launched internet gaming via their PlayNow.com service in 2010, becoming the first legal online casino in Canada. Loto-Québec launched a similar service known as Espacejeux shortly afterward, Manitoba launched internet gaming in 2013 by franchising PlayNow from the BCLC, the Ontario Lottery and Gaming Corporation launched PlayOLG in 2015, and Alberta launched Play Alberta in 2020. In 2020, the Atlantic Lottery Corporation began to deploy an online casino in Atlantic Canada, beginning in New Brunswick. In 2021, the Saskatchewan government entered into an agreement with the Federation of Sovereign Indigenous Nations for it to oversee internet gaming in the province, with the group partnering with the Saskatchewan Indian Gaming Authority and PlayNow as operator.

In July 2021, Ontario announced that it would introduce a regulated online gambling market open to private operators, which would be overseen by the new regulatory agency iGaming Ontario. The regulated market began operations in April 2022, making Ontario the first province to license private internet gambling operators. In 2025, Alberta passed legislation that established a similar model, with its regulated market beginning on July 13, 2026.

Despite the launch of legal services, the provincial lotteries have still raised concerns over the continued use of unlicensed services by Canadian residents, and over the extraprovincial marketing of operators only licensed to do business in provinces with regulated markets (which they felt made it difficult for customers to distinguish whether the services are legal in their jurisdiction).

=== France ===
On 5 March 2009, France proposed new laws to regulate and tax Internet gambling. Budget minister Eric Woerth stated the French gambling market would expand to adapt to "Internet reality." He further stated "Rather than banning 25,000 websites, we'd rather give licenses to those who will respect public and social order." Betting exchanges, however, will remain illegal under the new plans.

=== Germany ===
The German Interstate Treaty on gaming, which came into force on 1 January 2008, banned all forms of online gaming and betting in the country, with the exception of wagers on horse racing. The European Gaming & Betting Association turned to the European Commission with the request to take action against the German legislation, because such stringent legislation violated EU rules. In 2010, the European Court of Justice ruled that the monopolised gambling industry in Germany has to be liberalised. Schleswig-Holstein is the only German state that has already come up with their own gambling bill allowing gambling online. From 2012, casino operators can apply for an online gambling license in this state.

=== India ===
Online gambling is illegal in the state of Maharashtra under the "Bombay Wager Act". Other acts/legislations are silent with respect to online gambling/online gaming in India. The most recent law to address gambling online was the Federal Information Technology Rules where such illegal activities may be blocked by Internet providers within India. Another act is the Public Gaming Act of 1867. States tend to operate on their own authority.

Online gambling legal issues in India are complicated in nature as Gambling in India is regulated by different states laws and online gambling is a central subject. To ascertain the position of Indian government, the Supreme Court of India sought the opinion of central government in this regard but the same was declined by the central government. This has made playing of online cards games like rummy, poker, etc. legally risky. Playing Rummy in India is legal as according to the verdict of Supreme Court of India, Rummy is a Game of skills and cannot be considered as Gambling.

On 3 September 2015, Central Board of Direct Taxes (CBDT) issued a Circular titled "Clarification on Tax Compliance for Undisclosed Foreign Income and Assets" under the black money act which directs the online poker players in the country to declare their money transactions on foreign poker sites through the e-wallets and virtual cards.

On 12 September 2026, Al Jazeera investigation revealed that weak government regulation has allowed online gambling platforms to operate with few controls, leading to severe financial and personal harm for individuals and their families.

=== Israel ===
The Israel gambling law (Israeli Penal Law 5737 - 1977) does not refer specifically to online gambling (land based gambling and playing games of chances is prohibited except in the cases of the Israel Lottery and the Israeli Commission for Sports Gambling). In December 2005, the attorney general ordered all online gambling operations, online backgammon included, to close their businesses and at the same time commanded credit card companies to cease cooperating with online gambling websites. In May 2007, the attorney general had excluded the online backgammon website Play65 from the ruling, due to "the unique circumstances of the site's activity", allowing it to return to full activity in Israel.

In 2012, the Tel Aviv Police Commander ordered local ISPs to block access to several online gambling sites. The District Court invalidated this order. The Supreme Court dismissed an appeal in 2013, finding that the police do not have legal authority to issue such orders. The government responded by proposing a bill that will authorize such orders, referring to child pornography, drug trafficking and online gambling websites.

=== Kenya ===
Kenya has a strong mobile payment services offering and a growing middle class.

=== New Zealand ===
In July 2025, New Zealand legalized iGaming and allowed 15 online platforms to conduct legal online gambling.

=== Nigeria ===
Retail betting shops are very popular and mobile gaming is growing with internet. There is a strong network for sending and receiving payouts via SMS.

=== Philippines ===
The Philippine Amusement and Gaming Corporation (PAGCOR) regulates gambling in the Philippines including online gambling providing licenses to approved operators.

There has been proposals involving online gambling in the Congress of the Philippines as recently as the 20th Congress. This includes proposals to outright ban online gambling or impose regulations to make it less accessible such as banning the use of e-wallets for online gambling.

PAGCOR is against a total ban of online gambling, only favoring stricter regulations.

=== Poland ===
In December 2016 the amendment to the Polish Gambling Act was scheduled to come into force on 1 April 2017. Online gambling will be only possible on the sites with Polish license.

=== Russia ===
Russian legislation, enacted in December 2006, prohibits online gambling altogether (as well as any gambling relying on telecommunications technology).

=== Serbia ===
Online casinos must comply with new certification games.

=== South Africa ===
The industry does have laws but are weakly enforced.

=== Singapore ===
In 2014, the Singapore parliament tabled the Remote Gambling Bill as a counter-measure against online gambling locally, while parliamentary member Denise Phua spoke against legalised gambling in Singapore.

=== Ukraine ===
Gambling was prohibited in Ukraine in 2009 after a fire occurred in an illegal gambling hall in Dnipro (former Dnipropetrovsk), in which nine people died.

The Law On Prohibition of Gambling Business, signed by then President of Ukraine Viktor Yushchenko, made all forms of gambling, including slots machines, bookmaking and online gambling illegal in Ukraine.

Despite the 2009 law, many venues continued to operate using legal loopholes for many years. In early January 2020, over 900 such gambling operations were closed down in preparation for a legalised market.

On January the 24th 2020, legislators in the Verkhovna Rada passed the first stage of the law to reintroduce legal gambling in Ukraine. In August 2020 bill 2285-D passed, making online gambling, bookmaking, slot halls and casinos legal in Ukraine.

During the Russian invasion of Ukraine, several Russian online casinos were accused of targeting Ukrainian customers in order to sell their data to Russian security services.

=== United Kingdom ===
In 2003 Tessa Jowell, then Culture Secretary suggested a change in the British Gambling laws to keep up with advances in technology.

Our gambling laws date back to the 1960s. Since then attitudes to gambling have changed and the law has failed to keep pace with rapid technological change. Gambling is now a diverse, vibrant and innovative industry and a popular leisure activity enjoyed in many forms by millions of people. The law needs to reflect that.

The Bill identified updates to the laws already in place in the UK, and also created the UK Gambling Commission to take over from the Gambling Board. The commission will have the power to prosecute any parties in breach of the guidelines set out by the bill and will be tasked with regulating any codes of practice they set forward. The Bill set out its licensing objectives, which are as follows:

- Ensuring no link between gambling and crime or disorder
- Ensuring that gambling is conducted fairly and openly
- Protecting children and vulnerable adults from harm or exploitation

The Bill also set out guidelines stating that gambling will be unlawful in the UK unless granted a licence, permit or registration. It outlined the penalty for being in breach of these guidelines, that being a maximum of six months in prison, a fine, or both for each offence. Any person under 18 will not be allowed to gamble and it is an offence to invite or permit anyone under the age of 18 years to gamble.

The UK's Gambling Act 2005 passed in that year. In 2022, the Conservative government postponed (for the fourth time) the publication of a whitepaper detailing the process of an update to the 2005 act. A government spokesperson said that due to the departure of Prime Minister Boris Johnson the report would be delayed until a new leader's policies were in place. The next Prime Minister Liz Truss appointed Michelle Donelan as Secretary of State for Digital, Culture, Media and Sport, whose voting record indicates pro gambling reform views.

==== Remote gambling ====
The Bill defined remote gambling as,

Gambling in which persons participate by the use of remote communication.

This would be using the internet, the telephone, radio, television of any other device used for communication. Any operator must have a separate licence for remote gambling and non-remote gambling. The licence must state what form the remote gambling would come in and any conditions appropriate to each operator. Offences for breaching remote gambling guidelines are the same as breaching non-remote gambling guidelines.

=== United States ===
Legislation on online gambling in the United States was first drafted in the late 1990s. Bob Goodlatte and Jon Kyl introduced bills to the Senate that would curb online gambling activities except for those that involved horse and dog races and state lotteries. Those bills were not passed.

The United States Court of Appeals for the Fifth Circuit ruled in November 2002 that the Federal Wire Act prohibits electronic transmission of information for sports betting across telecommunications lines but affirmed a lower court ruling that the Wire Act "'in plain language' does not prohibit Internet gambling on a game of chance." But the federal Department of Justice continues, publicly, to take the position that the Wire Act covers all forms of gambling.

In April 2004 Google and Yahoo!, the two largest Internet search engines, announced that they were removing online gambling advertising from their sites. The move followed a United States Department of Justice announcement that, in what some say is a contradiction of the Appeals Court ruling, the Wire Act relating to telephone betting applies to all forms of Internet gambling, and that any advertising of such gambling "may" be deemed as aiding and abetting. Critics of the Justice Department's move say that it has no legal basis for pressuring companies to remove advertisements and that the advertisements are protected by the First Amendment. In April 2005, Yahoo! instigated a restrictive policy about gambling ads. The USDOJ has no authority to enact or interpret laws, including via announcement.

In July 2006, David Carruthers, the CEO of BetonSports, a company publicly traded on the London Stock Exchange, was detained in Texas while changing planes on his way from London to Costa Rica. He and ten other individuals had been previously charged in a sealed indictment with violations of US federal laws relating to illegal gambling. While as noted above, a United States Appeals court has stated that the Wire Act does not apply to non-sports betting, the Supreme Court of the United States previously refused to hear an appeal of the conviction of Jay S. Cohen, where lower courts held that the Wire Act does make it illegal to own a sports betting operation that offers such betting to United States citizens.

The BetOnSports indictment alleged violations of at least nine different federal statutes, including 18 USC Sec. 1953 (Operation of an Illegal Gambling Business). Carruthers is currently under house arrest on a one million dollar bail bond.

In September 2006, Sportingbet reported that its chairman, Peter Dicks, was detained in New York City on a Louisiana warrant while traveling in the United States on business unrelated to online gaming. Louisiana is one of the few states that has a specific law prohibiting gambling online. At the end of the month, New York dismissed the Louisiana warrant.

Also in September 2006, just before adjourning for the midterm elections, both the House of Representatives and Senate passed the Unlawful Internet Gambling Enforcement Act of 2006 (as a section of the unrelated SAFE Port Act) to make transactions from banks or similar institutions to online gambling sites illegal. This differed from a previous bill passed only by the House that expanded the scope of the Wire Act. The passed bill only addressed banking issues. The Act was signed into law on 13 October 2006, by President George W. Bush. At the UIGEA bill-signing ceremony, Bush did not mention the Internet gambling measure, which was supported by the National Football League but opposed by banking groups. The regulation called for in the UIGEA was issued in November 2008.

In April 2007, Rep. Barney Frank (D-MA) introduced HR 2046, the Internet Gambling Regulation, Consumer Protection, and Enforcement Act, which would modify UIGEA by providing a provision for licensing of Internet gambling facilities by the director of the Financial Crimes Enforcement Network. Several similar bills have been introduced since then in the House and Senate.

In June 2009, the U.S. Department of Justice seized over $34 million belonging to over 27,000 accounts in the Southern District of New York Action Against Online Poker Players. This is the first time money was seized from individual players as compared to the gaming company. Jeff Ifrah, the lawyer for one of the account management companies affected, said that the government "has never seized an account that belongs to players who are engaged in what [Ifrah] would contend is a lawful act of playing peer-to-peer poker online."

On 3 December 2009, the House Financial Services Committee held a hearing on UIGEA and Rep. Frank's Internet Gambling Regulation, Consumer Protection, and Enforcement Act of 2009 (H.R. 2267) where experts in the fields of online security and consumer safety testified that a regulatory framework for Internet gambling would protect consumers and ensure the integrity of Internet gambling financial transactions. On 28 July 2010, the committee passed H.R. 2267 by a vote of 41–22–1. The bill would legalize and regulate online poker and some other forms of online gambling.

On 22 November 2010, the New Jersey state Senate became the first such US body to pass a bill (S490) expressly legalizing certain forms of online gambling. The bill was passed with a 29–5 majority. The bill allows bets to be taken by in-State companies on poker games, casino games and slots but excludes sports betting, although it allows for the latter to be proposed, voted on and potentially regulated separately in due course. However, a Fairleigh Dickinson University PublicMind poll in April 2009 showed only 26% of New Jersey voters approved of online sports-betting. On a national level, two-thirds (67%) of voters polled by PublicMind in March 2010 opposed changing the law to allow online betting. Men were more likely than women (29–14%) and liberals more likely than conservatives (27–18%) to approve of changing the law to allow online betting.

In May 2012, FDU's PublicMind conducted a follow-up study which asked voters if they favored or opposed online gaming/gambling and "allowing New Jersey casinos to run betting games online, over the Internet." The results showed that (31%) of voters favored while a sizable majority (58%) opposed the idea. Peter Woolley, director of the PublicMind, commented on the results: "Online gambling may be a good bet for new state revenue, but lots of voters don't think it's a good bet for New Jersey households."

On 15 April 2011, in U. S. v. Scheinberg et al. (10 Cr. 336), three online poker companies were indicted for violating U.S. laws that prohibit the acceptance of any financial instrument in connection with unlawful Internet gambling, that is, Internet gambling that involves a "bet or wager" that is illegal under the laws of the state where the bet is made. The indictment alleges that the companies used fraudulent methods to evade this law, for example, by disguising online gambling payments as purchases of merchandise, and by investing money in a local bank in return for the bank's willingness to process online poker transactions. The companies argue that poker is a game of skill rather than a game of chance, and therefore, online poker is not unlawful Internet gambling. There are other legal problems with the government's case, and the indictments did not mention the Wire Act. On 31 July 2012, it was announced that two of the three companies indicted for money laundering and forfeiture settled with the Manhattan U.S. Attorney for $731 million without legally admitting guilt. The government also asked the judge to approve a settlement with the third defendant, Absolute Poker. In March 2016, PokerStars spokesman Eric Hollreiser said his company finally had established an important beachhead in the U.S. market by being able to operate legally in New Jersey.

The online gambling laws also apply to online gambling platforms which exclusively use cryptocurrency to handle deposits and withdrawals. This is demonstrated by the 2015 landmark case of Seals with Clubs bitcoin poker site's run in with the law. This was the first criminal investigation of an illegally operating bitcoin gambling platform on US soil. The owner of the site, who operated out of Nevada, tried to justify the clear violation of both federal and state law by saying that the platform and players only ever used cryptocurrencies to do transactions, and those are not recognized as a currency by the federal government. Therefore, this constitutes social gambling. He was sentenced to two years probation and a $25,000 fine.

==== New Jersey legalizes online sports betting ====
On 8 November 2011, New Jersey voters were asked to consider "Public Question No. 1", also known as the Sports Betting Amendment. New Jersey required a majority vote to amend its state constitution. The result was 671,797 "Yes" (63.91%) to 379,339 "No" (36.09%). The voters' approval allowed the New Jersey legislature to legalize sports betting.

New Jersey state Senator Raymond Lesniak promptly introduced the Sports Wagering Act, S3113, on 21 November 2011. The act would decriminalize sports betting in New Jersey. It passed the New Jersey Senate and New Jersey General Assembly on 9 January 2012. Governor Chris Christie signed the act into law on 17 January 2012.

===== Sports leagues sue Governor Christie Twice =====
On 7 August 2012, the National Collegiate Athletic Association, National Football League, National Basketball League, National Hockey League, and Major League Baseball sued Governor Christie in NCAA, et al. v. Christie. The leagues contended that New Jersey's new Sports Wagering Law violated the Professional and Amateur Sports Protection Act of 1992.

The United States District Court for the District of New Jersey ruled for the NCAA and its co-plaintiffs. New Jersey appealed the district court's ruling to the United States Court of Appeals for the Third Circuit, which affirmed the lower court's ruling. New Jersey then appealed the Circuit Court's ruling to the Supreme Court of the United States, which failed to grant certiorari. Thus, New Jersey's Sports Wagering Act was successfully enjoined from going into effect.

New Jersey tried to legalize sports betting again on 16 October 2014, when the Senate and General Assembly passed the Sports Wagering Law. This legislation would partially repeal laws that criminalized sports betting. The law permitted state-licensed casinos and racetracks to provide sports betting. Moreover, the state would not be involved in the licensing or regulation of sports betting itself. Once again, US sports leagues opposed the law.

On 20 October 2014, the NCAA filed suit against New Jersey again in NCAA, et al. v. Christie II. The plaintiffs asked the court to grant a preliminary injunction against the law, arguing it was a clear violation of the Professional and Amateur Sports Protection Act.

On 21 November 2014, the New Jersey District Court ruled for the plaintiffs, deciding that the Sports Wagering Law violated the Professional and Amateur Sports Protection Act. Once again, Governor Christie appealed to the U.S. Third Circuit Court of Appeals, which again upheld the lower court's opinion.

===== The Professional and Amateur Sports Protection Act overturned =====
On 7 October 2016, New Jersey appealed the Third Circuit Court of Appeals decision to the United States Supreme Court. The court granted certiorari on 27 June 2017, considering the question of whether a federal statute (i.e., the Professional and Amateur Sports Protection Act) that prohibits modification or repeal of a state's law prohibiting private behavior impermissibly commandeers the power of the states.

Murphy v. NCAA was argued before the Supreme Court on 4 December 2018. On 14 May 2018, the Supreme Court ruled 6–3 to reverse the Third Circuit Court of Appeal's decision, holding that the Professional and Amateur Sports Protection Act's provision on banning state authorized sports betting violated the anti-commandeering doctrine of the Tenth Amendment of the U.S. Constitution.

The Professional and Amateur Sports Protection Act was declared unconstitutional because it interfered with a state's right to repeal its own anti-gambling laws. Shortly thereafter, New Jersey offered legal sports betting to its residents. Many other states have since legalized online Sports betting for their residents.

=== United Arab Emirates ===
Despite the Sharia laws that restrict gambling tools and machines in the UAE, the country granted its first commercial gaming operator's licence to Wynn Resorts that was developing a luxury resort, including a 224,000 sq. ft. casino component, at Al Marjan Island in Ras Al Khaimah. In September 2023, the UAE established the General Commercial Gaming Regulatory Authority (GCGRA), hinting towards its plans to legalize gambling. The GCGRA has outlined a comprehensive framework that includes licenses for casinos, slot machines, and poker tables, as well as lotteries, internet gaming, and sports wagering. The GCGRA mandates player management tools, including deposit limits and cooling-off periods for online gaming.

The first lottery license has been granted to The Game LLC, operating under the banner of the ‘UAE Lottery’. This move supersedes existing lottery operators like Mahzooz and Big Ticket, which are no longer legally permitted to offer their services. Players are required to engage only with licensed gaming operators to avoid severe penalties. The regulations also specify that operators must enable players to restrict themselves from online gaming platforms for a period of at least 72 hours upon request. This is part of the broader initiative to ensure a secure and responsible commercial gaming environment in the UAE.

The UAE's move to legalize gaming is seen as a strategic step to enhance its tourism and entertainment sector, leveraging its existing infrastructure and business-friendly environment. This development is expected to attract major gaming operators and contribute significantly to the country's economy.

The country does not have any formal gaming laws, and therefore the project details about the casino were not completely made public. Local citizens are not permitted for gambling, which remains a legal and cultural taboo.

=== Other countries ===
Various forms of online gambling are legal and regulated in many countries, including some provinces and territories of Canada, most members of the European Union and several nations in and around the Caribbean Sea.

== Online gambling industry statistics ==
=== UK ===
In the UK, between 2009 and 2010, 4% of adults had bet online. Between April 2010 and March 2011, online gambling which is regulated by the UK Gambling Commission yielded £660.74 million, a 5% increase on the previous year. The British regulated online gambling sector was worth a 12% market share of the British regulated gambling industry within the same time period. Most British consumer online gambling activity is on overseas regulated websites, and estimates place the UK consumer market for online gambling at £1.9 billion for 2010. (Approximately three times the size of the British regulated market). In the year to March 2011, 5000 adults were surveyed and reported that 11.2% of them had participated in at least one form of remote gambling in the previous four weeks. Approximately half of the respondents had only participated in National Lottery products. Another group of interviews conducted by the Gambling Commission.

In March 2011, the UK online gambling industry employed 6,077 full-time employees. A number that has declined since 2008 where 8,918 full-time employees were in employment within the industry. Also, there were 291 remote gambling activity licences held by 225 operators at this date. Three of the sectors within online gambling are betting, bingo and casino which between them turned over £13,456.07 million between April 2010 and March 2011. During this time period, betting turned over a substantial proportion of this amount, turning over £13,081.44 million, with bingo and casino turning over £26.75 million and £347.87 million respectively.

=== European Union ===
According to the European Gaming and Betting Association (EGBA), online gambling is a growing sector within the EU, with gross gaming revenue (GGR) expected to reach €29.3 billion in 2022. According to EGBA, the EU online gambling market was valued at €22.2 billion GGR in 2018 - growing 11% from €20 billion GGR in 2017 - and accounted for 49.2% of the global online gambling market. The EU online gambling channelled or white market accounted for €15.9bn, reflecting an average EU-wide channelling rate of 71.7%. Online gambling now represents 23.2% of the total EU gambling market activity, while offline gambling (lotteries, casinos, bookmakers shops, etc.) had a total GGR of €73.5bn, accounting for 76.8% of the overall EU gambling market. In 2018, the UK market (34.2%) accounted for the largest portion of the EU online gambling market, based on GGR, followed by Germany (11.1%), France (8.8%) and Italy (8.1%).

=== United States of America ===
The American Gaming Association predicts that betting Americans will wager around $35 million on sportsbooks during the 2024 NFL season. This is expected to be the most wagered on NFL season in the past 7 years of legal betting within the sport.

Gaming generated $72B USD in 2024 as per the AGA.

== Problem gambling ==
Pathological gambling is a disorder characterized by a compulsive need to gamble, leading to significant harm in areas such as mental health, finances, relationships, and career.

Cluster B personality disorders (including antisocial, borderline, histrionic and narcissistic disorders) are the most prevalent among problem gamblers. Borderline personality disorder is one of the most common personality disorders among compulsive gamblers. People diagnosed with borderline personality disorder tend to engage in high-risk activities due to challenges regulating emotional states to a healthy, stable baseline

=== Parts of the brain affected by online gambling ===
Gambling affects two main areas of the brain, specially the ventral striatum and the prefrontal cortex. The ventral striatum is the portion of the brain that processes rewards and emotions. The prefrontal cortex is the front portion of the brain that controls planning, complex problem-solving, personality and processing potential consequences. Scientists have also found that people with gambling disorders have reduced activity in their prefrontal cortex and increased connectivity to their reward system.

Researchers have found that teenagers are vulnerable to online gambling because different parts of the brain mature at different rates. The prefrontal cortex is particularly late to develop, especially in boys.

Gamblers have smaller volumes in the amygdala and hippocampus, two regions associated with emotional learning and stress regulation.

=== Psychological effects and symptoms of online problem gambling ===
Some people become addicted when they gamble compulsively. Compulsive gambling is characterized by a compelling and intense desire to gamble and it is difficult to control. When people gamble, dopamine is released. This hormone produces feelings of pleasure and reward. When people win bets, they feel excited and their brains release feel-good chemicals. When people become addicted to gambling, these chemicals are no longer released by other pleasurable things.

Online gambling becomes a problem when it causes stress, anxiety and depression. Stressful life events such as losing a job, ending a relationship, or experiencing financial difficulties can contribute to this problem. In addition, people with antecedents of addictive behaviors may be more susceptible. Emotions also play a key role, such as using gambling as a social outlet, seeking the thrill of gambling, escaping negative emotions, or simply passing the time.

Online gambling by young people can have a devastating impact on individuals, families, and communities. Due to their developmental stage, children and adolescents are at a heightened risk of developing this addictive behavior. Compulsive gambling can lead to feelings of shame, guilt, and loneliness in young people. It can also lead to significant financial problems, as they may use their own money or their parents' credit cards.

This can lead to serious long-term problems. These behaviors can have a ripple effect, affecting not only the individual but also their families and the community at large.

The signs and the symptoms that characterize problem gamblers are an obsession with gambling, a need to bet larger amounts of money to feel excited, and repeated failed attempts to stop. People who are compulsive gamblers often gamble to escape problems or negative emotions. Some people also steal money from their family or at their work in order to gamble, which can lead to serious problems such as financial ruin, relationship breakdown, and even illegal activities.

=== Gambling like activities and their effect on children ===
While "Gambling like" is not technically gambling, they share many similarities and phycological effects. As the scope of the internet changes, it's important to watch as other areas of life evolve into the online world. With the popularization of new forms "gambling like activities", such as lottery style loot boxes, authors David Zendle and Heather Wardle gathered results from a cross-sectional online survey, where they found "the odds of problem gambling were 11.4 times higher among those who purchased loot boxes with their own money." They believe young adults who willingly participate with loot boxes should considered as a high-risk group for problem gambling.

=== Possible treatment ===
Treatment for people with compulsive gambling begins with recognizing the problem. Compulsive gamblers often deny they have a problem or need treatment.

The most common and successful treatment plans for problem gamblers include individual therapy, such as Cognitive Behavioural Therapy (CBT) or support groups such as GA (Gamblers Anonymous). Treatments that prove effective for substance and alcohol abuse are also considered to treat problem gambling. As the gambler normally shows obsessive-compulsive conducts, abstinence is a primary step to begin treatment.

Antidepressants may help treat the symptoms of pathological gambling, but not enough evidence has been collected to prove this as an effective way of treatment.

A 2015 review found evidence of higher rates of mental health comorbidites, as well as higher amounts of substance use, amongst internet gamblers, compared to non internet gamblers. Causation, however, has not been established, and the review postulated that there may differences in the cohorts between internet and land-based problem gamblers.

In the United States in 1999 the National Gambling Impact Study stated "the high-speed instant gratification of Internet games and the high level of privacy they offer may exacerbate problem and pathological gambling". A UK government-funded review of previous research noted a small scale patient survey leading to press reports claiming that 75% of people who gamble online are "problem" or "pathological" gamblers, compared to just 20% of people who visit legitimate land-based casinos.

A study by the UK Gambling Commission, the "British Gambling Prevalence Survey 2010", found that approximately 0.9% of the adult population had problem gambling issues, more than shown in a previous study in 2007. The highest prevalence of problem gambling was found among those who participated in playing Poker at a pub or club (20.3%), Dog races (19.2%) and online slot machine style or instant win games (17%). Additionally the report noted a 15% increase in overall gambling since 2007, from a rate of 58% in 2007 to 73% in 2010. Significantly, the 2010 prevalence survey notes that whilst the overall gambling figure had increased, the prevalence among men at 75% was not dissimilar to the amounts in two previous surveys in 1999 and 2007 which were 76% and 71% respectively. However, the prevalence among women for 2010 was 71%, which was higher than 68% in 1999 and 65% in 2007.

In August 2014 the National Council of Problem Gambling (NCPG) partnered with the Gambling Integrity Services (GIS). The GIS will evaluate these recently regulated internet gambling operators in order to ensure they comply with NCPG's internet Responsible Gambling Standards.

A study released by the University of Buffalo in November 2014 states that the explosion of online gambling in the United States in the past decade has not given rise to more people with gambling problems.

According to Darren R. Christensen, Nicki A. Dowling, Alun C. Jackson and Shane A. Thomas a survey recorded in Australia shows that gambling severity rates were estimated at non-gambling (34.8%), non-problem gambling (57.4%), low risk gambling (5.3%), moderate risk (1.8%) and problem gambling (0.7%).

== Money laundering ==
It has also been alleged that the largely unsupervised electronic funds transfers inherent in online gambling are being exploited by criminal interests to launder large amounts of money. However, according to a US GAO study, "Banking and gaming regulatory officials did not view Internet gambling as being particularly susceptible to money laundering, especially when credit cards, which create a transaction record and are subject to relatively low transaction limits, were used for payment. Likewise, credit card and gaming industry officials did not believe Internet gambling posed any particular risks in terms of money laundering."

In 2011, the U.S. Attorney for the Southern District of New York filed United States v. Scheinberg, a federal criminal case against the founders of the three largest online poker companies, PokerStars, Full Tilt Poker and Cereus Poker Network (Absolute Poker/Ultimatebet), and a handful of their associates, which alleges that the defendants violated the Unlawful Internet Gambling Enforcement Act and engaged in bank fraud and money laundering in order to process transfers to and from their customers.

A BBC investigation in 2019 described how cryptocurrencies such as bitcoin were being used for under-age gambling, money-laundering and political corruption in the Caribbean island of Curaçao.

Following the expansion of online gaming operations in Southeast Asia, focus has again fallen on the money laundering risk associated with the industry, the presence of organized criminal organisations, targeting of people in countries where it is illegal to gamble, and use of trafficked or coerced labour. East and Southeast Asian organised crime groups are reported to be deeply involved in the industry.

In 2024, the United Nations Office on Drugs and Crime (UNODC) reported that Southeast Asia was facing "unprecedented challenges" posed by transnational organized crime and illicit economies, with the region becoming a testing ground for new technologies and a rapidly expanding underground banking and money laundering industry. UNODC has noted that casino junkets, originally based in Macau, had "effectively become bankers for organized crime". Following tightening regulation on the junket industry, many of the actors behind them transitioned to e-junkets and online gambling.

Prominent organized crime actors, including the now imprisoned Alvin Chau and Levo Chan, were identified in the junket money laundering space, and have since received lengthy prison sentences in China for a range of offences. The UNODC has also documented the convergence of East and Southeast Asian criminal groups around junkets, casinos, online, gambling, drug trafficking, and other serious criminal enterprises. Sanctioned Chinese businessman Zhao Wei, for example, established and chairs the Golden Triangle Special Economic Zone, which hosts numerous online gambling operators, and is also a known hub for drug, human and wildlife trafficking. As profits from the various regional illicit industries have grown, diverse and increasingly sophisticated channels are required to launder the proceeds, and land-based and online casinos have played a crucial role in what has been described as "a backdoor for organized crime to launder their growing supply of dirty money into the global financial system".

While both legal and illegal online gambling operations have taken root in the region, their activities have spread globally, with high profile law enforcement actions taking place as far away as the Isle of Man, targeting entities linked to suspected East Asian criminal groups engaged in online gaming and money laundering.

== Player perception ==
Players' attitudes towards sites plays an important role in online purchases and customer loyalty. Lack of trust in payment systems and security are primary reasons for avoiding online gambling. Due to the virtual nature of online gambling, it is hard for players to verify the authenticity of sites they are using. In the UK, the Gambling Commission (GC) mandates that the odds of winning must be clearly displayed for non-remote gaming machines, typically in the form of a return to player percentage (%RTP). This rule aims to encourage transparency and help users make better-informed decisions about the games. Unlike in physical casinos, randomness and deck shuffling cannot be verified by visual means unless the casino is provably fair. Players interact with other players through GUIs, which connect to the gambling site's server in a non-transparent manner. In an online survey of 10,838 online casino and poker players from over 96 countries, respondents reported a high level of mistrust of online gambling. 91.5% believed that reputable third party reports on randomness and payouts were important to gain their trust. However, contrasting research shows that seals-of-approval granted by these third parties does not have a strong influence on purchasing behavior, nor are customers usually aware of their existence.

== Responsible gambling ==
Responsible Gambling Features (RGFs) are features that online gambling sites use to promote responsible behavior and reduce harm. These include limiting amounts that can be bet or deposited over a designated period of time, self-assessment tests for gambling problems, and warning signs of prolonged play or high expenditure. RGFs are usually opt-in features for players and are required by certain jurisdictions. For example, operators in Denmark, Germany, and Spain must provide deposit limits, but this is voluntary for Australian operators. A sample of online poker players from Sweden indicated that RGFs increase their trust in a company and reduce their anxiety about winning from other players. However, in jurisdictions that mandate Responsible Gambling Features, only a small percentage of customers use them. In Australia, 0.8% used the deposit limit on SportsBet and 6% used deposit loss limits on BetFair Australia.

== See also ==
- Behavioral modernity
- Evolutionary mismatch
- Gaming control board
- List of mergers and acquisitions in online gambling
