= Poker Players Alliance =

American nonprofit Interest group

- Company type: Non-Profit
- Industry: Political Advocacy
- Founded: 2005
- Headquarters: Washington, DC
- Key people: Executive Director John Pappas; Chairman Alfonse D'Amato; VP of Player Relations Rich Muny; Boardmember Linda Johnson; Boardmember Greg Raymer; Boardmember Patrick Fleming
- Revenue: 1.2 million (2005)
- Total assets: 56,916 United States dollar (2010)
- Website: https://www.pokeralliance.com/

The Poker Players Alliance (PPA) is an American nonprofit Interest group formed to emphasize the rights of poker players, and to protect the players' liberties." The PPA formed to serve as an advocacy group to Washington to establish rights and protections for U.S. poker players. Within the first year of its existence, the PPA garnered over 600,000 members. In April 2008, the PPA claimed to have signed up its one millionth member. Membership growth has been due in part to promotional activities by online poker cardrooms like Party Poker.

This organization unsuccessfully lobbied against the Unlawful Internet Gambling Enforcement Act of 2006, which prohibited financial institutions from making payments to internet gambling sites. A number of online poker sites suspended U.S. operations. Other sites have continued to serve U.S. customers, citing legal opinions that UIGEA does not apply to poker.

== Advocacy ==
The PPA aims to overturn laws such as the Unlawful Internet Gambling Enforcement Act of 2006, whether through political or judicial means. For example, the PPA in conjunction with online poker sites, dedicated June 15, 2006 as "Write Your Congressmen Day." Another example is the "PPA Fly-In", where around 100 members and multiple professional poker players, including Annie Duke, Howard Lederer, and Chris Ferguson, flew to Washington, D.C. to lobby Congress for poker rights.

The PPA hired former New York Sen. Alfonse D'Amato as its chairman. In an interview with Cardplayer Magazine, he said "What really needs to happen is to have a legitimate house, a fair game, and a fair operator, and not take away from 20-plus-million citizens who play poker the opportunity to play poker on the Internet." D'Amato went on to point out that under the current legislation, that the companies "with good business practices" could potentially be replaced by "those who do not care" because the U.S. is driving "the industry offshore, where we have no regulation and no controls."

Michael Bolcerek, the former president of the PPA, says that the PPA has been able to mount a counteroffensive to the anti-gaming bills on Capitol Hill. He states:

"Opponents of online gambling fail to realize that sweeping it under the rug will only serve to exacerbate any issues with problem gambling. Turning the wildly popular Internet poker from a common pastime to an illegal activity, banned by Congress, will ultimately ensure that problem gamblers do not confront their issues with gambling and drive them further underground. Regulation and taxation, however, would provide billions in revenue for federal and state governments. These funds could be used to treat problem gamblers and to educate adults and youths alike on the dangers of gambling addictions."

Bolcerek has appeared on over 60 local stations, CNN, CNBC, and Fox to get his message out.

In August 2007, the organization announced Michael Bolcerek had stepped down as president. John Pappas filled the role vacated by Bolcerek.

Shortly after the 2009 WSOP began, the Southern District of New York Action Against Online Poker Players seized $34 million from over 27,000 accounts of poker players affiliated with Full Tilt Poker, Absolute Poker, Ultimate Bet and PokerStars. Jeff Ifrah, the attorney for one of the disbursement companies affected, said that the government "has never seized an account that belongs to players who are engaged in what [Ifrah] would contend is a lawful act of playing peer-to-peer poker online." The timing of the seizure may have been intentionally timed to affect the access to people's accounts during the World Series of Poker.

In July 2009, the PPA held National Poker Week, an effort to rally support for H.R. 2267, the Internet Gambling Regulation, Consumer Protection, and Enforcement Act. More than 350,000 people signed the petition supporting the licensing and regulation of online poker and more than 150,000 letters were sent to Members of Congress during National Poker Week. Additionally the PPA and its membership held more than 100 meetings with Members of Congress.

== Bills supported ==
The PPA supports several bills in Congress that amend UIGEA. The Skill Game Protection Act (HR 2610), proposed by Rep. Robert Wexler (D-FL), provides an exemption to UIGEA for games of skill, including poker, mah jong, bridge, and other games. As of December 15, 2007, HR 2610 has 20 cosponsors. The Internet Gambling Regulation and Enforcement Act of 2007 (H.R. 2046), proposed by Rep. Barney Frank (D-MA), provides for federal licensing and regulation of online gaming sites. As of December 15, this bill has 45 cosponsors. The Internet Gambling Study Act (H.R. 2140), proposed . Shelley Berkley (D-NV), provides for a study by the National Academy of Sciences to identify the proper response of the United States to the growth of Internet gambling. As of December 15, this bill has 68 cosponsors.

In April 2007, Rep Barney Frank (D-Mass) introduced a bill (the aforementioned HR 2046) that would not simply repeal the 2006 bill, but would open up a U.S. based market for online gambling. The Internet Gambling Regulation and Enforcement Act of 2007 "would establish a regulatory and enforcement framework to license companies to accept bets and wagers online from individuals in the U.S." The act would address underage and compulsive gambling, while providing safeguards for Americans. Legalizing these transactions would enable the government to tax and monitor fund transfers. This would allow transactions to be checked "against a number of anti-fraud, money laundering and terrorism databases".

== See also ==
- Internet Gambling Regulation, Consumer Protection, and Enforcement Act
