= Unfair practices =

Unfair practices may refer to

- Unfair business practices
- Unfair competition
- Unfair labor practice

== See also ==
- Unfair dismissal
- Social injustice
