= Stop Predatory Gambling =

American anti-gambling organization

The National Coalition Against Legalized Gambling (NCALG) was a national organization that was against legalized gambling. Formed by Tom Grey, a Methodist minister, the organization educated communities about the negative effects of gambling. It became part of the Stop Predatory Gambling Foundation in 2008.

== History ==
The NCALG was formed in 1994 by Tom Grey. Their goal was to educate the American public about the effects of gambling, including economic, political, and physical effects. They held annual national seminars across the country, partnering with many other organizations including Citizens for a Stronger Pennsylvania,

The NCALG had a branch called the National Coalition Against Gambling Expansion (NCAGE). NCAGE was under the same board of directors; however, it focused on working with grassroots organizations to prevent the spread of legalized gambling. The organization contributed to Congress passing the National Gambling Impact Study Commission Act, which established the National Gambling Impact Study Commission in 1997. Through their efforts, they "defeated casino gambling" in several states including Ohio, Arkansas, and Florida. They aided in closing slot machines in South Carolina and a lottery in Alabama. They were also on the advisory board for the Citizens' Debate Commission.

As the group became bigger, it became the Stop Predatory Gambling Foundation, which was formed in 2008. Les Bernal is the national director of Stop Predatory Gambling. Tom Grey continues at the organization as the senior advisor. It is a not-for-profit educational organization that is now headquartered in Washington, D.C.

== Founder and other members ==
Tom Grey was the founder and executive director of the organization. Grey was a Methodist minister from northwestern Illinois. He is also a Vietnam veteran. He graduated from Dartmouth College as well as from the Garrett Evangelical Theological Seminary. He created the organization after 80 percent voters in Illinois voted against the building of a local casino. The Illinois Gaming Board ignored public opinion and built the Galena casino regardless. Grey saw an opportunity to increase awareness of gambling and its effects on local communities. In May 1994 he organized the NCALG with a network of individuals from almost all 50 states and Canada.

Grey hosted a number of seminars in South Carolina in 1999. In these seminars he also discussed the dangers of video gambling. Bernie Horn was a spokesperson for the National Coalition Against Legalized Gambling. In 1995, Ron and Mary Helen Hyde were asked by the Church of Jesus Christ of Latter-day Saints to help with NCALG. The Hydes turned their home into a national information center for NCALG. The office began with a computer, fax machine and a phone line, but expanded. In 2003, Grey offered William Bennett the position of executive director of NCALG, despite having a reported gambling addiction.

== Ideology ==
NCALG argued that the social and economic effects of gambling are detrimental to a community. They asserted that gambling triggers addictive behaviors, and therefore, by legalizing gambling, more youth will be exposed to the addiction of gambling. NCALG pointed out that casinos bring more crime into a community. Grey stated that the main debate is about gambling institutions giving false promises about the chances of winning. "What they sell is an addictive product," he said. "The job of government is to protect and serve people—not to addict and rob them."
