= Internet Gambling Regulation, Consumer Protection, and Enforcement Act =

Proposed legislation in US Congress in 2009

- Long title: An act to regulate Internet gambling, to provide consumer protections, and for other purposes.
- Enacted by: the 113th United States Congress

Citations
- Public law: H.R.2282 - Internet Gambling Regulation, Enforcement, and Consumer Protection Act of 2013

Legislative history
- Introduced in the House as H.R. 2282 by Peter T. King on June 6, 2013

The Internet Gambling Regulation, Consumer Protection, and Enforcement Act was a proposed 2009 bill in the United States House of Representatives that is intended "to provide for the licensing of Internet gambling activities by the Secretary of the Treasury, to provide for consumer protections on the Internet, to enforce the tax code, and for other purposes." The bill was originally introduced by Representative Barney Frank (D-MA) on June 12, 2009, and as of July 20, 2009, had bipartisan support from 47 co-sponsors. The bill was held in the House Financial Services Committee.

== Description of the bill ==
The bill would have found the following:

1. "Since the development of the Internet, millions of people have chosen to gamble online, and today Internet gambling is offered by operators located in many different countries under a variety of licensing and regulatory regimes."
2. "Despite the increasing use of the Internet for gambling by persons in the United States, there is no Federal or State regulatory regime in place to protect United States citizens who choose to engage in this interstate activity, or to oversee operators to establish and enforce standards of integrity and fairness."
3. "In the United States, gambling activities, equipment, and operations have been subject to various forms of Federal and State control, regulation, and enforcement, with some form of gambling being permitted in nearly every State and by many Indian tribes."
4. "Internet gambling in the United States should be controlled by a strict Federal licensing and regulatory framework to protect underage and otherwise vulnerable individuals, to ensure the games are fair, to address the concerns of law enforcement, and to enforce any limitations on the activity established by the States and Indian tribes."
5. That entities licensed to provide internet gambling in the United States would have to be heavily regulated and monitored.
6. "There is a need to extend the regulatory provisions of this Act to all persons, locations, equipment, practices, and associations related to Internet gambling, with each State and Indian tribe having the ability to limit Internet gambling operators from offering Internet gambling to persons located within its territory by opting out of the provisions of this Act."

The bill then discussed the qualifications an organization would need to possess in order to operate an online poker site, legal requirements, fees and taxes, penalties, and regulations.

Had H.R. 2267 passed, it would have automatically created an exception for poker to the Unlawful Internet Gambling Enforcement Act of 2006 (UIGEA). In the meantime, Frank also proposed another bill, the Internet Gambling Regulation, Consumer Protection, and Enforcement Act (H.R. 2266) which would have delayed the full implementation of the UIGEA until 2010.

== Reaction ==
On July 5, 2009, Frank addressed the players at the 2009 World Series of Poker Main Event (day 1-c) concerning the status of this bill. During his address, he accused the Republican Party of being behind the Department of Justice's seizure of poker players' bank accounts in early June. After his address, Frank initiated the third day of the tournament with the words, "Shuffle up and deal."

Goldman Sachs issued a notice to its investors that online gambling would be legal in the U.S., and that the only question is when. They believe that the tax ramifications alone make the passage of regulated poker a foregone conclusion. "Were the market to be legalized," the Sachs report stated, "we believe that the size of the revenue opportunity could increase materially... Based on an assumption of 30% penetration of offline poker players and $300 gross gaming revenue (GGR) per player, we estimate that a legal poker market could be worth $3bn."

== See also ==
- Poker Players Alliance
