= Southern District of New York action against online poker players =

The Southern District of New York (SDNY) Action Against Online Poker Players was a legal action taken by the Department of Justice in an effort to crack down on online poker. The action occurred around June 8, 2009, when the government ordered four banks to freeze over 34 million dollars in payments owed to about 27,000 poker players. According to the Poker Players Alliance, a grass-roots organization for poker players, federal prosecutors ordered Citibank, Wells Fargo and Goldwater Bank and Alliance Bank of Arizona to freeze the accounts of Allied Systems and Account Services. Allied Systems and Account Services are two of the account-management companies that Full Tilt Poker, Absolute Poker, Ultimate Bet and PokerStars use for the disbursement of funds.

== Legality of online poker ==
The legality of online poker in the United States is uncertain. In 2006, the Security and Accountability For Every Port Act was passed in an effort to combat terrorism at United States' harbors. One of the provisions included in the act is known as the Unlawful Internet Gambling Enforcement Act of 2006 (UIGEA). This provision prohibits the transfer of funds from a financial institution to an Internet gambling site, with the notable exceptions of fantasy sports, online lotteries, and horse/harness racing. The law makes exceptions for games of skill as opposed to games of luck; thus, opponents of the measure argue, it should not apply to poker. Numerous studies have shown that poker is a game of skill, for example pointing to the predictive power of player's rankings on future success.

The law, opponents argue, does not address transfer of money to individuals nor does it make online gambling illegal. The only state that has a law explicitly banning online poker is Washington. The federal government holds that playing online is a violation of the Act. Arlo Devlin-Brown, the assistant United States Attorney for the Southern District of New York, says that the U.S. government can seize the funds "because they constitute property involved in money laundering transactions and illegal gambling offenses." In seizing the money, the federal government did not cite the UIGEA but rather the 1961 law "The Wire Act and Illegal Gambling Business Act." According to the Competitive Enterprise Institute, a think tank "dedicated to free enterprise and limited government", the Justice Department has taken the stance that online wagering is prohibited by the Act, "despite the fact that the courts have repeatedly smacked down any attempt to apply the federal Wire Act ... to non-sport related Internet gambling."

Nelson Rose, a law professor who specializes in gambling law at Whittier Law School in Costa Mesa, California, said that Southern District of New York's action was "very aggressive, and I think it's a gamble on the part of the prosecutors." Professor Rose indicated that it was unclear as to what law would allow for the seizure of money from individuals as compared to the companies involved. Previous government actions focused on sports betting, not poker and that according to Rose, many courts and legal authorities believe poker is different from sports betting because poker involves a transfer of money between individuals, while sports betting is between an individual and online casino.

Account Services lawyer Jeff Ifrah said that the government "has never seized an account that belongs to players who are engaged in what [Ifrah] would contend is a lawful act of playing peer-to-peer poker online."

== Response ==
After the funds were seized all of the affected poker sites reimbursed the players the money that was seized. According to one PokerStars player, the site gave him an additional 10 percent credit. Professor Rose indicated that because the poker sites are reimbursing the players, that the legality of the actions of the Southern District may never be tested. Since the sites are making the player whole, they may not have standing to challenge the Southern District. "Payment processors won't want to show up in court in the U.S. and, even if you could find a player," Rose said, "would they be willing to testify under oath?"

Immediately after the seizure, the Poker Players Alliance issued a statement. In the statement, the PPA alleges that "in at least two cases" the seizure of funds was done without first obtaining the proper warrants. The statement states that the action was taken despite the fact that "no federal or state court has ever found a payment processor or a player accessing an Internet poker site to have violated the federal laws alleged by the Southern District in this case."

== Timing ==
The timing of the Southern District's actions has been the subject of considerable discussion. The Competitive Enterprise Institute (CEI) noted that the timing occurred at a time when, "regulators had finally begun to think about internet gambling as a legitimate activity that citizens have the right to engage in." They also noted that new legislation proposed by Barney Frank to legalize and regulate online poker "seems likely to pass." Rose mentioned other theories related to the timing. According to one theory, the National Football League, an opponent of expanding internet gambling, pressured the Southern District to retaliate in light of Frank's proposal. Another theory states that the Southern District performed the raid to ensure that Frank's bill would pass. Rose explains that California law enforcement agencies raided a retirement home bingo game shortly before a vote to raise people's awareness of the issue. As the seizure occurred at a time where poker players might be seeking to participate in the World Series of Poker, Ifrah hypothesized that the raid was timed to coincide with the 2009 World Series of Poker. Finally, Rose speculates that the U.S. Department of Justice may have seized the accounts as a money grab on the belief that nobody would fight the seizure in court. "It's a tremendous gamble," Rose said, "on the part of the U.S. Department of Justice to go after players and even more of a gamble to go after poker players."

== See also ==
- United States v. Scheinberg
