= Unlawful Internet Gambling Enforcement Act of 2006 =

United States law

- Other short titles: Internet Gambling Bill; SAFE Port Act; Security and Accountability For Every Port Act of 2006; Warning, Alert, and Response Network Act
- Long title: An Act to prevent the use of certain payment instruments, credit cards, and fund transfers for unlawful Internet gambling, and for other purposes.
- Acronyms (colloquial): UIGEA
- Nicknames: Internet Gambling Prohibition and Enforcement Act
- Enacted by: the 109th United States Congress
- Effective: October 13, 2006

Citations
- Public law: 109-347
- Statutes at Large: 120 Stat. 1884 aka 120 Stat. 1952

Codification
- Titles amended: 31 U.S.C.: Money and Finance
- U.S.C. sections created: 31 U.S.C. ch. 53, subch. IV § 5361 et seq.

Legislative history
- Introduced in the House as H.R. 4411 by Jim Leach (R–IA) on November 18, 2005; Committee consideration by House Financial Services, House Judiciary; Passed the House on July 11, 2006 (317-93 Roll call vote 363, via Clerk.House.gov); Passed the Senate on September 14, 2006 (98-0 Roll call vote 249, via Senate.gov, in lieu of H.R. 4954); Reported by the joint conference committee on September 29, 2006; agreed to by the House on September 30, 2006 (409-2 Roll call vote 516, via Clerk.House.gov, in lieu of H.R. 4954) and by the Senate on September 30, 2006 (agreed unanimous consent, in lieu of H.R. 4954); Signed into law by President George W. Bush on October 13, 2006

The Unlawful Internet Gambling Enforcement Act of 2006 (UIGEA) is United States legislation regulating online gambling. It was added as Title VIII to the SAFE Port Act (found at 31 U.S.C. §§ 5361–5367) which otherwise regulated port security. The UIGEA prohibits gambling businesses from "knowingly accepting payments in connection with the participation of another person in a bet or wager that involves the use of the Internet and that is unlawful under any federal or state law." The act specifically excludes fantasy sports that meet certain requirements, skill games, and legal intrastate and intertribal gaming. The law does not expressly mention state lotteries, nor does it clarify whether interstate wagering on horse racing is legal.

== Background on online gambling ==
The United States Court of Appeals for the Fifth Circuit ruled in November 2002 that the Federal Wire Act prohibits electronic transmission of information for sports betting across telecommunications lines but affirmed a lower court ruling that the Wire Act "in plain language does not prohibit Internet gambling on a game of chance". While some states have laws specifically prohibiting online gambling, many do not. Additionally, in order for an online gaming company to start, a license from a state is required. The only state to ever issue such a license is Nevada, in March 2013.

== Legislative history ==
The Act was passed on the last day before Congress adjourned for the 2006 elections. According to Sen. Frank Lautenberg (D-N.J.), no one on the Senate–House Conference Committee had seen the final language of the bill before it was passed. The Economist has written that these provisions were "hastily tacked onto the end of unrelated legislation".

Although a bill with the gambling wording was previously debated and passed by the House of Representatives, the SAFE Port Act (H.R. 4954) as passed by the House on May 4 and the Senate on September 14, bore no traces of the Unlawful Internet Gambling and Enforcement Act that was included in the SAFE Port Act signed into law by George W. Bush on October 13, 2006. The UIGEA was added to the Conference Report 109-711 (submitted at 9:29pm on September 29, 2006), which was passed by the House of Representatives by a vote of 409–2 and by the Senate by unanimous consent on September 30, 2006.

Among the Congressional supporters of the Act were Rep. Jim Leach [R-IA], a former chairman of the House Banking Committee and Rep. Robert Goodlatte [R-VA], who co-authored H.R. 4411 (the Internet Gambling Prohibition and Enforcement Act). Bill Frist [R-TN], former majority leader of the Senate, and Jon Kyl [R-AZ] are both credited with expediting the UIGEA's passage through the Senate. Though the SAFE Port Act's provisions related to Internet gambling were drawn exclusively from H.R. 4411, significant portions were removed, including text relating to the Federal Wire Act.

The Internet Gambling Prohibition Act, a prior version of the gambling part of the bill passed the House in 1999 but failed in the Senate in part due to the influence of lobbyist Jack Abramoff.

UIGEA § 5364 required that regulations be issued by the Federal Reserve and the Department of the Treasury within 270 days of the passage of the Act. In October 2007, these agencies issued a "Notice of Proposed Rulemaking", which effectively tabled draft UIGEA regulations for public comment. In response to the NPRM, 410 responses were received from depository institutions, depository institution associations, public policy advocacy groups, consumers, "gambling-related" entities, payment system operators, federal agencies, and members of Congress.

The Bush administration had previously adopted the position that it would not finalize any rule until after November 1, 2008. This last-minute rulemaking that binds the hands of an incoming administration is commonly termed the midnight drop.

The final regulations (termed the "Final Rule") were released November 12, 2008, and came into effect on January 19, 2009, the day before the Obama administration took office. Compliance was not required until December 1, 2009, in order to give participants an opportunity to implement the necessary safeguards and procedures.

== Act details ==
According to the overview posted on the FDIC website, the act prohibits gambling businesses from "restricted transactions". Restricted transactions involve gambling businesses when they knowingly accept payments from another person in a bet or wager over the Internet. It also requires that the Treasury and Federal Reserve Board with consultation from the Attorney General to promulgate regulations requiring certain participants in payment systems that could be used for unlawful Internet gambling to have policies and procedures reasonably designed to identify and block or otherwise prevent or prohibit the processing of restricted transactions. These regulations are independent of any other regulatory framework, such as the Bank Secrecy Act or consumer protection regulations.

=== Section 5361, Findings and Purpose ===
The Act begins with Congress's findings and purpose. Findings include a recommendation from the National Gambling Impact Study Commission. One of the findings asserted in the opening of the bill is the assertion that Internet gambling is a growing problem for banks and credit card companies. The opening section of the act also states that "new mechanisms for enforcing gambling laws on the Internet are necessary," especially for cross-border betting. The Act contains a clause that ensures no change be made to any other law or Indian compact. This clause makes known that the Act cannot be used as a defense to another crime, or to expand existing gambling.

=== Section 5362, Definitions ===
This section outlines definitions of gambling terms to be used throughout the act. The Act defines a bet or wager to include risking something of value on the outcome of a contest, sports event, "or a game subject to chance". The "game subject to chance" restriction is designed to include Internet poker. The Act then addresses the issue of skill by describing betting as including the purchasing an "opportunity" to win a lottery, this lottery being predominantly subject to chance. The Act expressly prohibits lotteries based on sports events. Some activities such as securities and commodities, including futures, that are traded on U.S. exchanges are, by statute, declared not to be gambling. "Designated payment system" covers any system used by anyone involved in money transfers that the federal government determines could be used by illegal gambling. "Financial transaction provider" is a very broad definition covering everyone who participates in transferring money for illegal Internet gambling. This expressly includes an "operator of a terminal at which an electronic fund transfer may be initiated" and international payment networks. "Interactive computer service" includes Internet service providers. "Restricted transaction" means any transmittal of money involved with unlawful Internet gambling. "Unlawful Internet gambling" is defined as betting, receiving, or transmitting a bet that is illegal under federal, state, or tribal law. The Act says to ignore the intermediary computers and look to the place where the bet is made or received. To force casinos to report large cash transactions, federal law was changed to define "financial institution" as including large gambling businesses. All other definitions are standard.

=== Section 5363, Money Transfers ===
This section covers money transfers. The bill states "[n]o person engaged in the business of betting or wagering may knowingly accept" any money transfers in any way from a person participating in unlawful Internet gambling. This includes credit cards, electronic fund transfers, and even paper checks. But the restriction on transfers is limited to Internet gambling businesses, not mere players. It also would not cover payment processors or ISPs, even under a theory of aiding and abetting. The Act does not make it a crime to knowingly transmit funds for illegal gambling. Neither the player nor the intermediary can be charged with this crime. The language of the Act even eliminates the possibility of charging financial institutions and computer hosts under a theory of aiding and abetting, since it explicitly states in the definitions section that being in the business of gambling does not include a financial transaction provider or an ISP.

=== Section 5364, Regulations ===
Under section 5364, Federal regulators have 270 days from the date the bill is signed into law to come up with regulations to identify and block transactions with gambling sites. The regulations require everyone connected with a "designated payment system" to identify and block all restricted transactions. The Act allows the federal regulators to exempt transactions where it would be impractical to require identifying and blocking, such as paper checks.

=== Section 5365, Civil Suits ===
Since there is no way to regulate overseas payment processors, section 5365 of the Act allows the United States and state attorneys general to bring civil actions in federal court. The courts have the power to issue temporary restraining orders and preliminary and permanent injunctions to prevent restricted transactions. However, this is not effective against payment processors who are entirely overseas. The Act provides for limited civil remedies against "interactive computer services". An Internet service provider can be ordered to remove sites and block hyperlinks to sites that are transmitting money to unlawful gambling sites. ISPs are under no obligation to monitor whether its patrons are sending funds to payment processors or even directly to gambling sites. But once it receives notice from a U.S. Attorney or a state attorney general, the ISP can be forced to appear at a hearing to be ordered to sever its links.

=== Other pertinent provisions ===
Criminal penalties under section 5366 include up to five years in prison, a fine, and being barred from involvement in gambling. Under section 5367, the Act makes ISPs and financial institutions liable if they actually operate illegal gambling sites themselves. Lastly, the Act requests, but does not require, the executive branch to try to get other countries to help enforce this new law and "encourage cooperation by foreign governments" in identifying whether Internet gambling is being used for crime.

== Criticisms ==
Opponents of the UIGEA have criticized the act and believe that it will not work, comparing it to the prohibition of alcohol.

Gaming consultant Michael Shackleford has also been critical of the UIGEA stating that the act has "undoubtedly depressed play" but has failed in its primary objective as "there are ways of funding accounts without using US banks, and millions of players know that".

Many have argued that the act has failed to address the dangers of online gambling. They state that the act and the Department of Justice successfully forces easily regulated large publicly traded companies out the market and introduces small unscrupulous private companies into the market. Doing so could result in amplifying risks of consumer abuse, underage gambling, problem gambling and money laundering. Critics believe that regulation of online gambling is a better alternative.

== Responses from online gambling sites ==
All online gambling sites listed on the London Stock Exchange or similar markets have stopped taking United States players due to the passage of the Act, while most non-public companies have announced an intention to continue taking US customers.

PartyGaming, which runs PartyPoker.com, had its publicly traded stock drop almost 60% in 24 hours as a result of the bill's passage. The company was moved from the FTSE 100 Index to the FTSE 250 Index on October 11, 2006.

== WTO dispute ==
Antigua and the United States have been involved in a long-running World Trade Organization dispute over U.S. restrictions on online gambling. The WTO ruled on January 25, 2007, that the U.S. is in violation of its treaty obligations by not granting full market access to online gambling companies based in the island nation. On March 30, 2007, the WTO confirmed the U.S. loss in the case.

On June 19, Antigua filed a claim for US$3.4 billion in trade sanctions against the United States, along with a request for authorization to ignore U.S. patent and copyright laws. This claim was filed a day after similar demands for compensation were made by the European Union.

The United States settled the dispute by granting concessions in other sectors. The administration of President George W. Bush refused to disclose the details of those concessions, however. In April 2008 Congressmen Barney Frank and Ron Paul called for the agreements to be made public. They stated that the concessions "could cost the United States many billions of dollars in compensation" and that the administration's invocation of "national security" as a reason to block disclosure under the Freedom of Information Act (FOIA) was "a misuse of the FOIA process." When the administration continued to keep the information secret, Public Citizen brought suit on behalf of Ed Brayton, a journalist whose FOIA request had been denied.

== Challenge to UIGEA ==
In May 2009, Congressman Barney Frank introduced a bill to overturn the gambling aspects of the Act, "The Internet Gambling Regulation, Consumer Protection, and Enforcement Act", which seeks to repeal the major online gaming obstacles of the UIGEA and go further in protecting Americans from fraud, while safeguarding against underage and problem gamblers.

Frank also introduced a bill to delay the implementations of the UIGEA for one year, until December 1, 2010. The bill was put into effect, however, the regulations were only extended until June 1, 2010.

== Enforcement ==
In April 2011, the founders of PokerStars, Full Tilt Poker, and Absolute Poker, the three largest Internet poker companies that then accepted U.S. players, were among those indicted for charges that included violations of the UIGEA. According to the United States Attorney in New York, the companies allegedly tried to circumvent UIGEA rules with the help of others who acted as "payment processors" by helping disguise gambling revenue as payments for non-existent goods such as jewelry or golf balls.

== See also ==
- Baxter v. United States
- Commonwealth of Pennsylvania vs Walter Walkins
- Daily fantasy sports
- Southern District of New York Action Against Online Poker Players
- Poker Players Alliance
