= Kahnawake Gaming Commission =

Online gaming association

The Kahnawake Gaming Commission is a gaming regulatory body that licenses and regulates a large number of online casinos, online poker rooms and online sportsbook sites, as well as three land-based poker rooms that are situated within the Mohawk Territory of Kahnawake.

The Commission was first established in 1996 pursuant to the Kahnawake Gaming Law enacted by the Mohawk Council of Kahnawake. The Commission's Regulations concerning Interactive Gaming were first enacted in July, 1999.

The permits issued by the Commission to online gambling operators are called Client Provider Authorizations. The Commission charges an initial application fee for a Client Provider Authorization of US$40,000. Application fees include the cost of the first annual fee for both Client Provider Authorizations and Key Person Licences and are refundable if an application is not granted.

== Legality ==
The Mohawk Council of Kahnawake and the Commission have consistently asserted that the jurisdiction to enact the Kahnawake Gaming Law is an aspect of Kahnawake's Mohawk or "aboriginal rights" that have existed since time immemorial and that were most recently recognized and affirmed in subsection 35(1) of Canada's Constitution Act, 1982. Since it was first established in 1996, the legality of the Kahnawake Gaming Law and the activities of the Commission have never been challenged under the laws of Canada or any other jurisdiction.

In July, 2007, in a case that raised a challenge to a decision of the Commission refusing the issuance of a permit, the Quebec Superior Court decided in favour of the Commission. However, because the court ruled against the plaintiff it stated that "the Court does not consider it necessary to rule on the validity ... of the gaming law".

== Regulatory activity ==
Presently, the Commission licences over 50 online gaming operators, representing an estimated 250 online gaming sites.

In September 2009, following a lengthy investigation, the Commission issued its decision in what has become known as the Ultimate Bet cheating scandal. The Commission's decision affirmed that cheating had occurred on the Ultimate Bet poker site and imposed a number of sanctions on Ultimate Bet's ownership, Tokwiro Enterprises, including: a direction that approximately US$22,000,000 be refunded to Ultimate Bet players, a fine in the amount of US$1,500,000 and a direction that Ultimate Bet modify its operations in numerous specific ways to ensure there would be no further incidences of cheating.

In September 2016, the New Jersey Division of Gaming Enforcement announced that it had reached an understanding with the Kahnawake Gaming Commission wherein the KGC would no longer provide licenses to gambling operators who accept customers from the United States of America.

== See also ==
- Akwesasne Mohawk Casino in the United States
- Société des casinos du Québec
