= Unfair business practices =

Type of business practices

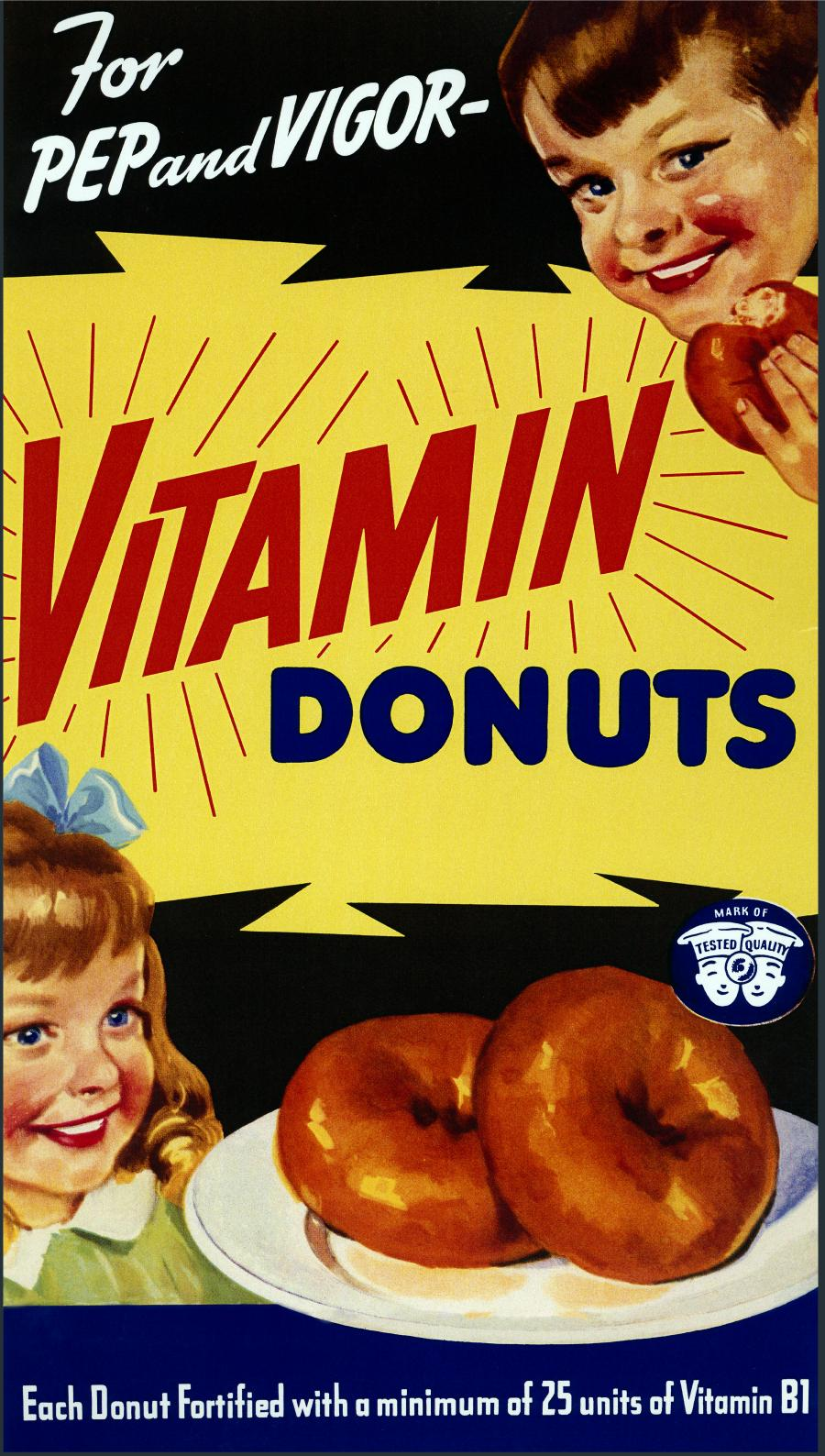
In the 1920s in the United States, the Food and Drug Administration began to prohibit advertising claims such as this "vitamin donut" poster claiming that they provide "pep and vigor".

Unfair business practices (also unfair commercial practices) describes a set of actions by commercial organizations which are considered unjust, and which may be unlawful. It includes practices which are covered by other areas of law, such as fraud, misrepresentation, and oppressive or unconscionable contract terms. Protections may be afforded to business-to-business dealings, or may be limited to those dealing as consumers. Regulation of such practices is a departure from traditional views of freedom to agree on contractual terms, summed up in the 1804 French Civil Code as qui dit contractuel dit juste (roughly, anything contractual is fair).

== Canada ==
Canadian provinces enact their own consumer protection laws which differ in scope and coverage. For example, Saskatchewan's Consumer Protection Act says:

It is an unfair practice for a supplier, in a transaction or proposed transaction involving goods or services, to: (a) do or say anything, or fail to do or say anything, if as a result a consumer might reasonably be deceived or misled; (b) make a false claim; (c) take advantage of a consumer if the person knows or should reasonably be expected to know that the consumer: (i) is not in a position to protect his or her own interests; or (ii) is not reasonably able to understand the nature of the transaction or proposed transaction.

For example, the Saskatchewan Act has been applied to a case in which an automobile dealer mis-sold cars, based on allegations of false claims, representing goods as new or unused when they weren't, and using exaggeration, innuendo, or ambiguity when representing material facts.

Other Canadian provinces have laws headed Unfair Trade Practices Act (Alberta), "Trade Practices Act" (B.C.), "Business Practices Act" (Ontario), Consumer Protection Act (Quebec), and Trade Practices Inquiry Act (Manitoba).

== European Union ==
Under the Unfair Commercial Practices Directive 2005 (amended 2017) each member state is required to regulate unfair business practices. As the EU described its objectives:

The objective of the EU Directive on unfair commercial practices from 2005 was to boost consumer confidence and make it easier for businesses, especially small and medium-sized enterprises, to trade across borders. It is the overarching EU legislation regulating unfair commercial practices that occur before, during and after a business-to-consumer transaction has taken place.

For instance, in August 2025 a German court stopped Apple Watch advertising as a "CO2-neutral product" finding the claim misleading to consumers.

== United States ==
In the United States, the Federal Trade Commission addresses unfair business practices. It has in the past included in its mission the goal of preventing "fraud, deception, and unfair business practices in the marketplace". It does so by "collecting reports from consumers and conducting investigations, suing companies and people that break the law, developing rules to maintain a fair marketplace, and educating consumers and businesses about their responsibilities". Individual states within the U.S. are also responsible for protecting consumers against unfair practices.

== United Kingdom ==
In the United Kingdom unfair business practices are treated as unfair terms in English contract law by the Unfair Contract Terms Act 1977, Consumer Rights Act 2015 and Consumer Protection from Unfair Trading Regulations.

== Australia ==
In Australia unfair business practices are regulated under the Australian Consumer Law which is enforced by the Australian Competition & Consumer Commission (ACCC). For example, in 2023 the ACCC took action against airline Qantas for, among other things, advertising and allowing customers to book unavailable flights.

The law provides, among other things, that "A person must not, in trade or commerce, engage in conduct that is misleading or deceptive or is likely to mislead or deceive."

== See also ==
- Anti-competitive practices
- Competition policy
- Consumer protection
- Misleading or deceptive conduct (Australian law)
- Restraint of trade
- Sucker list
- Unfair competition
