= Consumer Protection Act (Quebec) =

Consumer protection law of Quebec, Canada

29th Quebec Legislature
- Citation: CQLR c P-40.1
- Territorial extent: Province of Québec
- Passed: 1971

Repeals
- RSQ, c P-40.

Summary
- Gives protections to consumers in dealing with merchants and businesses.
- Status: In force

The Consumer Protection Act (French: Loi sur la protection du consommateur) is a Quebec law which gives protections to consumers in dealing with merchants and businesses. It requires merchants to deal honestly in all matters of advertising, and in fair contracts.

== Aims and objectives of the Act ==
The Act applies to all contracts made in Quebec between a consumer and a merchant, in its capacity of conducting its business. The contract can be either for a product or a service.

The main purpose of the act is to level out inequalities in bargaining power between the consumer and the merchant. The law annuls any contract term that contravenes this (similarly to, say, the Unfair Terms in Consumer Contracts Regulations 1999 in the United Kingdom).

== History and context of adoption ==
=== The emergence of consumerism ===
In the 1960s, consumerism became prominent in the United States, after its industrialisation. Market economies flourished. The consumer movement was a response in Europe, and in Canada, to what was perceived as overwhelming market forces to the detriment of the consumer.

=== Consumerism in Quebec ===
In Quebec, the emergence of a consumerist movement cast a light on the absence of consumer protection laws, notably the lack of legal obligations for businesses: the law was caveat emptor, let the buyer beware. But slowly, laws were introduced, culminating in the first Consumer Protection Act in 1971, pushed forward by the lawyer Claude Masse, who was later to become known as the main author of the law.

== Evolution ==
=== Amendments after adoption ===
Important amendments were made to the Act in 1978, seven years after the law was first adopted: these were mostly about advertising and guarantees (warranties). After this first major reform, several other smaller amendments have been enacted to cover new commercial practices.

=== Bill 24 (2011) ===
As an example, on 8 June 2011, the Quebec government ran through the "projet de loi 24" (Bill 24). This white paper reformed and re-established the rights and responsibilities of the Act for consumer credit contracts and mortgages; it put new responsibilities on lenders.

== Contents ==
=== Requirement for written contracts ===
Some contracts, especially those concerning credit terms that are established between a consumer and a merchant, must be made in writing. The law requires such contracts to be written in the French language, signed by both parties, and a copy given to the consumer.

A consumer has some minimal legal rights over the form of the contract, for example not to be held hostage over latent defects in the product, and that a guarantee will do what it says.

=== Distance selling regulations, and time to change one's mind ===
Contracts that are negotiated at a distance rather than in person (be it by post, email, telephone or Internet) without the personal presence of the merchant's negotiator have specific extra rights. The consumer may, within seven days, annul the contract.

The LPC allows internet trade but fixes the boundaries. The rules state, amongst other things, that the consumer's consent must be obtained and also enforces much of the small print in the contract. In some circumstances, the seven-day rule can be extended.

A change of mind by the consumer should not imply that the seller was in any bad faith, but the object of the law is to give a "cooling off period" where the consumer may change his mind. If a seller wishes to enter into such a market, it is the seller's risk to do so: caveat vendor. That risk cannot be transferred to the consumer.

=== Credit contracts, insurance contracts and hire purchase in the motor trade ===
All credit contracts are covered by the Act. Responsibility for issuing credit is that of the creditor, that is, the merchant. The Act requires all creditors to inform them of any issuance. It is perfectly legal to ask the consumer to pay a premium for credit card purchases or any other form of credit, or to buy a car or motorcycle on lease, but the rate of charge must be declared to the consumer.

The law is intended to prevent exorbitant interest rates, and discourage meaningless guarantees. Recourse to the law is via the civil courts, as detailed below. The aim of the law is to make sure a fair price is paid for the credit and to give the consumer rights of redress if he thinks he has been overcharged.

=== In practice: Allowed or forbidden? ===
The right is reserved for merchants, producers and advertisers to make representation to the Act or to negotiate with the consumer. For example, if it is a matter of credit, there are a series of measures relating to advertising. Without exception, sellers must clearly state the prices they will charge for credit. Some things given as "guarantees" must also be divulged to the consumer up-front. In general, advertising must be honest. Advertising to children less than thirteen years of age is forbidden.

Some traders, notably itinerant traders ("hawker"s and "busker"s), may be excluded from these rules, if they have a permit issued by the Office de la protection du consommateur (the Office). The law gives authority to the Office that in certain circumstances it may suspend, annul, or refuse to issue such permits.

=== Legal recourse and penalties ===
Several avenues are available through the Quebec civil law system if a consumer believes he has been mistreated.

The consumer may demand that the contract be annulled if there is no evidence that he signed it, and it is the trader's responsibility to show he had.

At the last resort, the usual rules of the Civil Code of Quebec can be enforced in court, and the Act may ask for damages. This rarely happens, though, because usually cases are agreed between the merchant and the consumer before it comes to court.

Were it to come to it, the court can place impositions on the trader to remove or amend terms in their consumer contracts, or to stop them from trading altogether.

== Office de la protection du consommateur ==
The Office de la protection du consommateur is established under the Act with responsibility to ensure the law is obeyed. Its remit, for overseeing the consumer protection laws, in practice comes in two parts:

1. active surveillance of the law, and to uphold trading standards
2. investigations and judgments on complaints by consumers after the fact.

The Office is also responsible for registering consumer complaints, researching them, and publishing the results of its research in mass media. The Office does not, itself, take on the role of a prosecutor with any case that a consumer may wish to bring against a merchant.

== See also ==
- Consumer rights
