= National Gambling Impact Study Commission Act =

- Other short titles: National Gambling Impact Study Commission Act of 1996
- Long title: An Act to create the National Gambling Impact and Policy Commission.
- Nicknames: National Gambling Impact and Policy Commission Act
- Enacted by: the 104th United States Congress
- Effective: August 3, 1996

Citations
- Public law: 104-169
- Statutes at Large: 110 Stat. 1482

Codification
- Titles amended: 18 U.S.C.: Crimes and Criminal Procedure
- U.S.C. sections amended: 18 U.S.C. ch. 95 § 1955

Legislative history
- Introduced in the House as H.R. 497 by Frank R. Wolf (R–VA) on January 11, 1995; Committee consideration by House Judiciary, House Resources; Passed the House on March 5, 1996 (agreed voice vote); Passed the Senate on July 17, 1996 (passed unanimous consent, in lieu of S. 704) with amendment; House agreed to Senate amendment on July 22, 1996 (agreed voice vote); Signed into law by President Bill Clinton on August 3, 1996

The National Gambling Impact Study Commission Act of 1996 (Pub. L. 104–169 (text) (PDF), 110 Stat. 1482, enacted August 3, 1996) is an Act of Congress that was signed into law by President of the United States Bill Clinton.

This legislation established the National Gambling Impact Study Commission in 1997 to conduct a comprehensive legal and factual study of the social and economic impacts of gambling in the United States on:

1. Federal, State, local, and Native American tribal governments;
2. Communities and social institutions generally, including individuals, families, and businesses within such communities and institutions.

Mandates a report to the President, the Congress, State Governors, and Native American tribal governments. Requires the Commission to contract with the Advisory Commission on Intergovernmental Relations and the United States National Research Council for assistance with the study. Authorizes appropriations. Specifically the commission was to look at the following:

1. existing policies and practices concerning the legalization of prohibition of gambling
2. the relationship between gambling and crime
3. the nature and impact of pathological and problem gambling
4. the impacts of gambling on individuals, communities, and the economy, including depressed economic areas
5. the extent to which gambling revenue had benefited various governments and whether alternative revenue sources existed
6. the effects of technology, including the Internet on gambling

The study lasted two years, and in 1999 the commission released it final report. There was a separate section on Indian gaming provided.

== Findings on Indian Gaming ==
The commission had many recommendations for the Indian gaming industry. It primarily called on the United States Congress to resolve the cycle of legal issues produced by the Indian Gaming Regulatory Act. It also recommended that "tribes, states, and local governments should continue to work together to resolve issues of mutual concern rather than relying on federal law to solve problems for them" The results of the study on Indian gaming industry are hard to determine.
