= Cereus Poker Network =

Online poker network

Cereus Poker Network was an online poker network comprising Absolute Poker and Ultimate Bet. The site is now insolvent and not processing player withdrawals. Cereus is owned by a private company, Blanca Games. Blanca Games bought all Network assets in August 2010 from Tokwiro Enterprises. The Cereus network was one of the world's ten largest online poker cardrooms prior to losing the majority of its player base in the wake of the April 15, 2011 online poker indictments.

== Absolute Poker ==
Absolute Poker was established in 2003. It was licensed by the Kahnawake Gaming Commission.

=== 2007 cheating incident ===
In September 2007, Absolute Poker began defending itself following accusations made by members of several Internet forums that the online poker room has a "superuser" account which allows one player to read the hole cards of another during a game. By October, widespread Internet allegations of cheating led to the Kahnawake Gaming Commission beginning an investigation.

Although allegations had been made about several accounts, one of the most remarkable pieces of evidence was a complete history of a tournament which was won by a player called "POTRIPPER". This history was far more complete than normal; it included all hidden hole cards for all of the players at the table, and the IP addresses of players and third-party observers who were watching the game via the Internet. It was sent out, perhaps by accident, when a player complained about suspicious play. Reviewing the data, mathematician and gaming expert Michael Shackleford said:

Hand after hand POTRIPPER’s play is consistent with that of a player who had knowledge of every player’s hole cards. The majority of hands show POTRIPPER bluffing at just the right times when his opponents were weak. Yet, when he was hopelessly outmatched, even with good cards, he laid them down.

Shackleford subsequently blacklisted Absolute Poker on his gaming-related website.

On October 19, an unofficial source within Absolute Poker claimed that an employee had hacked the system to "prove a point". On October 21, Absolute released an official statement:

...it appears that the integrity of our poker system was compromised by a high-ranking trusted consultant employed by AP whose position gave him extraordinary access to certain security systems. As has been speculated in several online forums, this consultant devised a sophisticated scheme to manipulate internal systems to access third-party computers and accounts to view hole cards of other customers during play without their knowledge. [...] We will pay for all losses suffered by the affected players as soon as our audit is finished and the amounts are determined.

In November 2007, Absolute issued an interim statement claiming the employee cheating had taken place over a period of forty days and that the cardroom was refunding $1.6 million to affected players. The Kahnawake Gaming Commission issued its report on the incident in January 2008. Among other consequences, Absolute Poker was fined $500,000.

The Quebec provincial police opened an investigation into the ongoing matter.

== UltimateBet ==
Founded in 2001, UltimateBet was licensed by the Kahnawake Gaming Commission.

UltimateBet offered Texas hold 'em, Omaha high and high low, seven card stud high and high low. Mixed game tables were also offered (HO, HOSE, HORSE). Like other online poker rooms, UltimateBet also offered a .net play-money-only cardroom.

UltimateBet hosted an annual live tournament, the Aruba Poker Classic, which was a World Poker Tour event for the first four seasons of the show. In 2005, Freddy Deeb won the event, claiming the $1,000,000 prize. Prior winners were Eric Brenes in 2004, Erick Lindgren in 2003, and Juha Helppi in 2002. The tournament in 2008 was a $5,000 buy-in event with a guaranteed $1 million top prize.

The company sponsored the poker television series Poker2Nite, hosted by professional poker player Joe Sebok and radio host Scott Huff.

Spokespeople for UltimateBet have included professional poker players Phil Hellmuth and Annie Duke, as well as actress-turned-poker player Tiffany Michelle.

Prior to the passage of the Unlawful Internet Gambling Enforcement Act of 2006, the software parent company of the cardroom, Excapsa Software was traded on the London Stock Exchange as XCP.L. In October 2006, the company announced it was selling its assets to a private company and moving to delist itself from the stock exchange. The legality of the deal was immediately questioned because most of the payment would take place after the act became law.

=== 2005–2007 cheating scandal ===
UltimateBet had a cheating scandal similar in nature to that of Absolute Poker. In May 2008, the company released a statement about the scandal, claiming that cheating had taken place from March 2006 to December 2007. However, in a later statement they confirmed that the cheating had begun at the start of 2005:

We have also confirmed that the cheating dates back further than we initially believed. We can now confirm that the cheating began in January 2005, long before Tokwiro Enterprises ENRG acquired UltimateBet from the previous ownership.

The company claimed the cheating was perpetrated by employees of the former owners, Excapsa Software. According to the company, the fraudulent activity was traced to unauthorized software code that transferred hole-card information of other players to the perpetrators during play. UltimateBet stated it had removed the cheating software as of February 2008 and began issuing refunds to affected players.

On September 29, 2008, the Kahnawake Gaming Commission stated it had found clear and convincing evidence to support a conclusion that between the approximate dates of May 2004 to January 2008, Russ Hamilton was the main person responsible for, and benefiting from, multiple cheating incidents at Ultimate Bet.

== 2011 indictments ==
United States Department of Justice website seizure notice

Online poker was suspended on April 15 at the top three United States websites (In order, PokerStars, Full Tilt Poker and Cereus Poker Network) and continues to be suspended at the top two.

On April 15, the Department of Justice seized the .com internet addresses of the three online gambling sites, PokerStars, Full Tilt, and Absolute Poker. The Cereus Poker Network continued operating until May 12, 2012 when players reported being unable to connect to game servers using the poker client software. At the time of its closure, it owed players an estimated $50 million, mostly to residents of the United States.

=== Absolute Poker Claims Process ===
On April 10, 2017, the Acting United States Attorney for the Southern District of New York issued a press release explaining that former players at Absolute Poker would be eligible to file claims to regain the funds in their balances at the defunct poker site. Money held in Ultimate Bet accounts is also eligible for reimbursement. The Garden City Group was retained as claims administrator. This is the same company that handled claims relating to Full Tilt Poker, which was also targeted in the 2011 indictments against online poker firms. After the Full Tilt Poker remissions process was completed, having returned more than $118 million to affected players, some of the money that had been set aside for it yet remained unclaimed. It is this leftover amount that will be distributed in compensation to the former customers of the Cereus Poker Network. The petition for remission deadline is set at Sept. 7, 2017 with payments to be processed shortly thereafter.

== See also ==
- Straight Flush (book)
