= Federal Wire Act =

Federal gambling law

- Other short titles: Interstate Anti-Crime Act
- Long title: An Act to amend chapter 50 of title 18, United States Code, with respect to the transmission of bets, wagers, and related information.
- Nicknames: Interstate Wire Act of 1961
- Enacted by: the 87th United States Congress
- Effective: September 13, 1961

Citations
- Public law: 87-216
- Statutes at Large: 75 Stat. 491

Codification
- Titles amended: 18 U.S.C.: Crimes and Criminal Procedure
- U.S.C. sections amended: 18 U.S.C. ch. 50 § 1081 et seq.

Legislative history
- Introduced in the Senate as S. 1656; Signed into law by President John F. Kennedy on September 13, 1961

The Interstate Wire Act of 1961, often called the Federal Wire Act, is a United States federal law prohibiting the operation of certain types of betting businesses in the United States. It begins with the text:

Whoever being engaged in the business of betting or wagering knowingly uses a wire communication facility for the transmission in interstate or foreign commerce of bets or wagers or information assisting in the placing of bets or wagers on any sporting event or contest, or for the transmission of a wire communication which entitles the recipient to receive money or credit as a result of bets or wagers, or for information assisting in the placing of bets or wagers, shall be fined under this title or imprisoned not more than two years, or both.

Several legal opinions and rulings have discussed whether forms of gambling other than sports betting fall within the Act's scope.

== Background ==
It is quite evident that modern, organized, commercial gambling operations are so completely intertwined with the Nation's communications systems that denial of their use to the gambling fraternity would be a mortal blow to their operations

— Robert F. Kennedy discussing how the Wire Act would affect organized crime

After being selected to become U.S. Attorney General, Robert F. Kennedy suggested to the 87th United States Congress to pass legislation which would make interstate gambling illegal. Kennedy's goal of the legislation was to help the United States Justice Department stop organized crime from trafficking. One of the eight bills given to Congress was Senate Bill 1656—The Wire Act.

== Signing ==
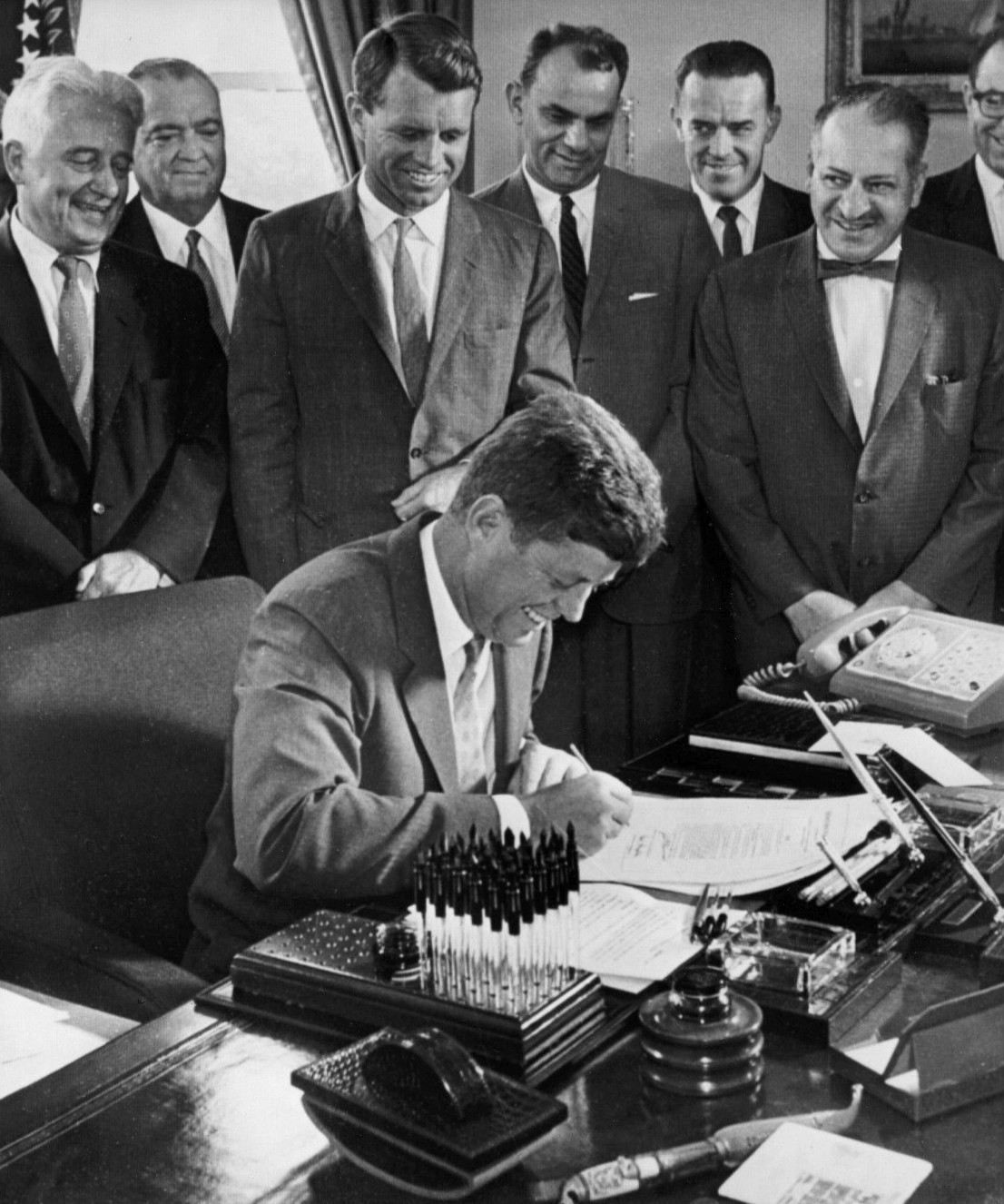
President Kennedy signing anti-crime bills in 1961. Left to Right: Senator Kenneth Keating of New York; Director of the Federal Bureau of Investigation (FBI), J. Edgar Hoover; Attorney General Robert F. Kennedy; Chief of the Legislation and Special Projects Section of the Criminal Division in the Department of Justice, Harold D. Koffsky; Deputy Chief of the Legislation and Special Projects Section of the Criminal Division, Edward T. Joyce; Chief Counsel of the Senate Judiciary Committee, Jerry Adlerman.

The Interstate Anti-Crime Acts were signed by the 35th President of the United States John F. Kennedy on September 13, 1961.

== Applicability to gambling other than sports betting ==
Legal opinions have varied as to whether the Wire Act applies only to sports betting, or applies to all forms of gambling, such as lotteries and casino games.

In a 2002 letter to Nevada state officials, the U.S. Department of Justice (DOJ) stated its opinion that the Wire Act "prohibits gambling over the Internet, including casino-style gambling."

In 2011, the DOJ reversed its position, when the Office of Legal Counsel (OLC) published a formal opinion on the scope of the Act concluding, "interstate transmissions of wire communications that do not relate to a 'sporting event or contest' fall outside the reach of the Wire Act."

The 2011 opinion noted that "the sparse case law on this issue is divided". The U.S. Fifth Circuit Court of Appeals ruled in 2002 that the Wire Act prohibition on the transmission of wagers applies only to sports betting and not other types of online gambling. Lower courts in other circuits had reached the opposite conclusion.

In 2018, the OLC reversed its position again, with an opinion declaring that the Wire Act's prohibitions are "not uniformly limited to gambling on sporting events or contests." The decision was published on January 15, 2019, with a promise to delay enforcement of the new opinion for 90 days to "give businesses that relied on the 2011 OLC opinion time to bring their operations into compliance with federal law."

The New Hampshire Lottery Commission filed suit in February 2019 seeking to vacate the OLC's new opinion, which the Commission claimed would reduce its annual profits by millions of dollars. New Hampshire Gov. Chris Sununu said the state wasn't interested in negotiating an out-of-court settlement, "we're looking to win." District Court Judge Paul Barbadoro ruled in the Commission's favor, stating that the Wire Act "is limited to sports gambling", but declined to vacate the 2018 OLC opinion. The First Circuit Court of Appeals affirmed the decision in January 2021.

In November 2021, International Game Technology filed a lawsuit to declare the 2018 opinion unlawful, seeking to protect itself from possible prosecution for its online lottery operations outside of the First Circuit. In September 2022, the Rhode Island District Court ruled in IGT's favor, stating that IGT could not be prosecuted under the Wire Act anywhere in the country, as the act applies only to bets placed on "sporting event or contest" and not other forms of gambling.

== See also ==
- Gambling in the United States
