= All India Gaming Federation =

Industry body of gaming operators in India

- Formation: 2016
- Type: Industry body
- Legal status: Active
- Purpose: Self-regulation, and standardization of the online skill gaming industry in India
- Headquarters: Patlipada, Maharashtra
- Region served: India
- Members: Online skill gaming operators
- Website: aigf.in

All India Gaming Federation (AIGF) is a skill-gaming industry body operator in India.

== History ==
AIGF was established in 2016.

== Organization ==
AIGF contains around 120 members including Mobile Premier League (MPL), Nazara Technologies, Gameskraft, Zupee, and Head Digital Works (A23).

In 2023, AIGF, alongside the E-Gaming Federation (EGF), and the Federation of Indian Fantasy Sports (FIFS) signed a voluntary code by the Internet and Mobile Association of India (IAMAI) made to have accountability and transparency in the gaming industry in India.

The three bodies again signed a code of ethics in 2025 with a number of implementation including safeguards for gamers’ data, providing accurate information to players, and have ethical advertising and promotions.

== See also ==
- Esports Federation of India
- Federation of Indian Fantasy Sports
- Fantasy sport in India
- Video games in India
- Sports betting
