= Esports Federation of India =

National governing body

E-Sports Federation of India
- Abbreviation: ESFI
- Formation: 2016
- Type: Non-profit organization
- Registration no.: CIN U74999DL2016NPL300732
- Purpose: Governing body for esports in India
- Headquarters: G-36, 1st Floor, G-Block; Outer Circle, Connaught Place; New Delhi, India
- President: Vinod Tiwari
- Director: Lokesh Suji
- Treasurer: Prabhat Kumar
- Affiliations: International Esports Federation; Asian Electronic Sports Federation; Global Esports Federation
- Website: esportsfederation.in

The E-Sports Federation of India (ESFI) is a non-profit organization established in 2016 as the national governing body for esports in India.

== History and formation ==
According to ESFI President Vinod Tiwari, the esports eco system had been in place for several years in India and the ESFI, under their own resources, had been sending teams to events for the past 15 years as of 2023. The organization has been sending esports teams to international competitions since 2007, including the Asian Indoor and Martial Arts Games and the Asian Games.

== Leadership ==
=== President ===
Vinod Tiwari serves as the president of ESFI and also holds the position of director of international and National Olympic Committee relations at the Olympic Council of Asia.

=== Director ===
Lokesh Suji serves as director of ESFI and has been vice-president for South Asia in the Asian Electronic Sports Federation (AESF) since the organization's inception. In April 2025, Suji was re-elected unopposed as Vice President for South Asia in the AESF for a four-year term. Suji also became the first Indian to be elected to the membership committee of the International Esports Federation (IESF) for a three-year term in 2023, receiving 42 out of 70 votes in his favour during the Ordinary General Meeting (OGM) of the IESF in Iasi, Romania.

=== Other officials ===
Prabhat Kumar serves as treasurer of ESFI, which Yugal Sharma also serves as a director.

== International memberships and recognition ==
ESFI is a full member of the International Esports Federation (IESF), Global Esports Federation (GEF) and Asian Electronic Sports Federation (AESF). ESFI is recognized as the National Governing Body for all esports in India with objectives to promote, encourage, organize, educate, train and control Electronic Sports (Esports).

However, it's important to note that as of 2022, no federation or association has been officially recognized for esports by the Ministry of Youth Affairs and Sports of the Government of India. The government does not recognize organizations like ESFI, EDAI and EI as official bodies to oversee esports.

== Achievements ==
=== Asian Games 2018 ===
ESFI achieved its first major international success at the 2018 Asian Games in Jakarta, Indonesia, where Tirth Mehta won India's first esports medal - a bronze in Hearthstone when esports was included as a demonstration event. Tirth Mehta, also known as 'gcttirth', won the bronze trophy after a comeback victory against Vietnam's Nguyen Anh Tuan in the bronze medal match. He had qualified for the Asian Games by defeating Sri Lanka and Pakistan in the qualifiers held by ESFI.

=== Commonwealth Esports Championship 2022 ===
India won a Bronze medal in DOTA 2 at the Commonwealth Esports Championship 2022 held alongside 2022 Commonwealth Games.

=== World Esports Championships ===
In 2023, ESFI organized the inaugural all-female CS:GO qualifiers where team Top-G emerged as champions, becoming the first Indian female CS:GO team to qualify for the global finals of the World Esports Championships (WEC).

== Key events and championships ==
=== National Esports Championships ===
ESFI organizes the National Esports Championships (NESC) annually to select players for international competitions. The 2022 edition commenced on 18 April 2022, featuring over 200 athletes competing in five popular esports titles: DOTA 2, FIFA, Hearthstone, Street Fighter V, and League of Legends. The 2023 edition included competitions in CS:GO, DOTA 2, Tekken, and eFootball, and featured the first-ever all-female CS:GO qualifiers.

=== WAVES Esports Championship (WESC) ===
ESFI organized the inaugural WAVES Esports Championship (WESC 2025) as part of the Ministry of Information & Broadcasting's World Audio Visual & Entertainment Summit (WAVES). The championship was backed by the Ministry of Information and Broadcasting and featured competitions across multiple titles including eFootball, WCC, and BGMI. Beginning with qualifiers from September 2024 and running through January 2025, the tournament culminated in a grand finale in February 2025 in New Delhi.

== Government relations ==
In January 2023, ESFI President Vinod Tiwari welcomed the government's decision to officially recognize electronic sports, describing it as "huge news" for all e-gamers in the country. He stated that the development would aid the federation in attracting sponsorship revenue and corporate backing to support e-gamers throughout India. In 2023, ESFI clarified that the 28% GST imposed on online gaming would not apply to esports, with President Vinod Tiwari emphasizing that esports has been recognized by the Indian government as a legitimate sport, distinguishing it from iGaming, betting, and gambling.

== International representation ==
ESFI has been sending esports teams to international competitions since 2007, including the Asian Indoor and Martial Arts Games and the Asian Games. The organization met with the Indian Olympic Association (IOA) in February 2022 to discuss preparations for the 2022 Asian Games in Hangzhou, China. During the meeting, ESFI officials including President Vinod Tiwari, Director Lokesh Suji, Director Yugal Sharma, and Treasurer Prabhat Kumar presented the "Road to Asian Games" Jersey to IOA President Dr. Narinder Dhruv Batra and Chef de Mission Bhupender Singh Bajwa.

== See also ==
- All India Gaming Federation
- Federation of Indian Fantasy Sports
- Daily fantasy sports
- Fantasy sport in India
- Video games in India
- Online gaming in India
- Sports betting
- International Esports Federation
- Asian Electronic Sports Federation
