= Gaming in India =

Gaming in India may refer to:

- Gambling in India, gambling activities in the country of India
- Video games in India, other types of electronic games in the country of India
