= Skillhub Online Games Federation =

- Abbreviation: SOGF / SOG Federation
- Formation: 2023
- Type: Sports federation
- Headquarters: New Delhi, India
- Official language: English
- Founder & Advisor: Nandan Jha
- President: Shankar Aggarwal (Retd. IAS)
- Advisor in Chief: Justice K G Balakrishnan
- Secretary General: Gursharan Singh
- Website: sogfederation.com

Skillhub Online Games Federation (SOGF) is a non-governmental organization that convenes the India's esports community. It was established in 2023, and is headquartered in Delhi. It promotes the esports and Mind Sports in India.

SOGF is deemed to be first federation in India to comply with the National Sports Development Code 2011 and the guidelines of International Olympic Committee and International Paralympic Committee of India and The vision of Digital India and Youth Development given by Prime Minister Shri Narendra Modi.

The federation was launched by the then Union Minister Anurag Thakur and group coordinator and senior director Ministry of Electronics and Information Technology Dr. Sandip Chatterjee.

SOGF is recognised by international bodies such as the International Mind Sports Association (IMSA), the Global Esports Federation (GEF), and the International Esports Federation (IESF).

SOGF, as an industry body for esports and mind sports in India, has constituted its executive framework as was mentioned in the Government of India's IT Laws 2023.

SOGF is known for its initiatives in the esports and mind sports sector, including the launch of SOG Grandmasters Series and SOGF Esports National Championship having chess, Chess for the Blind and Esports games like EA Sports FC 25 and Tekken 8.

== Board members ==
=== Advisor in Chief ===
- Justice K G Balakrishnan (37th Chief Justice of India and former chairman NHRC India)

=== Chairperson of Ethics Committee ===
- Justice Gyan Sudha Misra (former judge, Supreme Court of India)

=== President ===
- Shri Shankar Aggarwal (Retd. IAS, former union secretary for Ministry of Women and Child Development, additional secretary for Ministry of Defence and Ministry of Electronics and Information Technology, Govt. of India)

=== Vice President ===
- Shri Satpal Singh (wrestling coach and former wrestler of India)
- Shri Ashok Dhyanchand (Olympic medalist, Arjuna Awardee and former international hockey player)
- Smt. Sudha Singh (Indian Olympic athlete)

== See also ==
- Esports Federation of India
