= Tencent Esports =

Chinese esports brand

- Formerly: TGA
- Industry: Esports
- Founded: December 9, 2016
- Headquarters: Shenzhen
- Area served: Worldwide
- Key people: Mars Hou (general manager)
- Parent: Tencent Holdings Ltd.
- Website: esports.qq.com

Tencent Esports (simplified Chinese: 腾讯电竞; traditional Chinese: 騰訊電競), also spelled as Tencent E-sports, is a Chinese esports brand founded in 2016. It is the esports arm of Tencent, and a founding partner of the Global Esports Federation. It focuses on esports tournaments, esports education and esports technologies. It has several professional leagues, including LPL, KPL, KGL, PEL, and CFPL. It initiated the Tencent Esports Tech-Union, of which Intel, Nvidia and Qualcomm are members. It is a member of the Japan eSports Union.

Established by Tencent Interactive Entertainment, it is part of Tencent's Neo-Culture Creativity operations. In 2018, the China esports team, composed of the brand's athletes, won two gold and one silver medals at the Jakarta Asian Games. In 2019, it cooperated with the GEF. In 2022, it partnered with the Asian Electronic Sports Federation. In 2023, it supported the Road to Asian Games (RDAG), an esports event organized by the OCA and AESF.

== History ==
=== 2016-2017 ===
Tencent Esports was formerly known as TGA, which was established in 2010. On December 9, 2016, it was formally established as a new division and began operating independently. On June 16, 2017, the brand released the "Five-Year Plan".

=== 2018-2020 ===
Esports was first introduced as a demonstration sport at the 2018 Asian Games. In the same year, Tencent Esports, together with three esports products, League of Legends, Honor of Kings, Clash Royale, was included in the Asian Games.

In 2018, Tencent Esports worked with the University of Oxford to set up esports courses and host esports tournaments. In June 2019, it collaborated with Manchester City Football Club. In August, it set up a 5G esports joint lab with China Unicom.

In 2019, Arena of Valor, the international version of Honor of Kings, a game product of Tencent Esports, became an official game title of the SEA Games. In the same year, Tencent Esports reached a cooperation with China Media Group.

In 2019, the brand became a founding partner of the GEF. In August 2020, it introduced the #worldconnected initiative. In the same year, it partnered with FC Barcelona. In the same month, Tencent Esports and Razer rolled out co-branded gaming peripherals.

=== 2021–present ===
In July 2021, Tencent Esports co-launched customized gaming-themed rooms with Shangri-La Group. In August, a Tim Hortons and Tencent Esports Cafe store was opened in Shenzhen.

Esports became a medal event at the Hangzhou Asian Games. In November 2021, Tencent Esports, in association with League, FIFA Online 4, and other esports products, was selected for the Games. In 2022, the Jinge Hotel, built by the brand, went into operation.

In July 2022, Tencent Esports jointly released the 2022 Asian Esports Industry Development Report with the AESF. In July 2023, the Global Esports Summit and Tencent Esports Annual Conference was held in Shenzhen. In June 2024, it released the Empower Esports Worldwide Series. In August 2024, the first event of the Series took place in Saudi Arabia. Tencent Esports, along with representatives from the Esports World Cup Foundation, Qiddiya City, and local Saudi esports clubs, discussed several topics like international esports ecosystem exchange. In September, the Series event was held in Tokyo.

On February 16, 2025, the Series event took place in Shenzhen, with attendees including the OCA and the CMG.

In February, Tencent Esports became the strategic partner of the EWCF in China. According to the agreement, the two parties will jointly establish the EWC China Development Team.

In June 2025, Tencent Esports, together with the National Esports Development Research Institute of the China Media Group, jointly launched the 2024 Global Esports Industry Development Report.

In January 2026, Tencent Esports entered into a partnership with the OCA. Under the agreement, it will serve as the organization's official esports technology partner through 2035.
