= Ethics officer =

Ethics officer may refer to:

- Chief ethics officer, a senior ranking individual in an organization
- Ethics officer (Scientology), a role in the Scientology ethics and justice policies
