= Esports in the United Arab Emirates =

Esports has grown rapidly in the United Arab Emirates (UAE) since the 2010s, with significant investment and partnerships aimed at positioning the country as a regional hub for competitive gaming in an attempt to diversify the country's economy. The country was admitted to the Global Esports Federation as its 100th member federation in 2021. The UAE's expansion into the esports market has drawn criticism, particularly in relation to its record on LGBTQ rights.

== History ==
Electronic sports, known as esports, is a type of competitive video gaming where individuals or teams of individuals compete in events using electronic devices. Since the 2010s, the UAE has been developing its esports ecosystem as part of an effort to establish itself as a major hub for competitive gaming in the region, in an attempt to diversify its economy beyond a reliance on oil. As of 2024, the UAE was described as having a "strong emerging" presence in the esports market, with expected growth of more than 8%. Entertainment streaming and gaming has been noted as a "promising sector" by the Ministry of Economy.

According to Statista, the country has the highest percentage of adult gamers globally, with 9 out of 10 adults interviewed reporting that they played video games between 2021 and 2022. Other independent studies found that 65% of UAE residents identified as gamers. 44% of women in the country play video games.

In 2021, the Global Esports Federation admitted the Emirates Esports, representing the UAE, as its 100th member federation. The country's expansion into esports has gained controversy due to LGBTQ rights in the United Arab Emirates. In 2022, a planned esports tournament in the country hosted by Ubisoft was moved due to protests and a petition signed by over 13,000 individuals. In 2023, the country launched the Dubai Program for Gaming 2033, which aimed to create 30,000 jobs related to gaming and position the country as a hub for it by the year 2033. The country also aims for esports and gaming to contribute $1 billion to its GDP by that year. In January 2025, Abu Dhabi signed a $40 million partnership with the NIP group. In April, it was announced that the country was to open its first gaming resort in Ras Al Khaimah. The Emirates Gaming League was established in March 2025 by the Emirates Esports Federation, with an AED 9 million prize pool.
