= Joy Bhattacharjya =

Indian sports producer

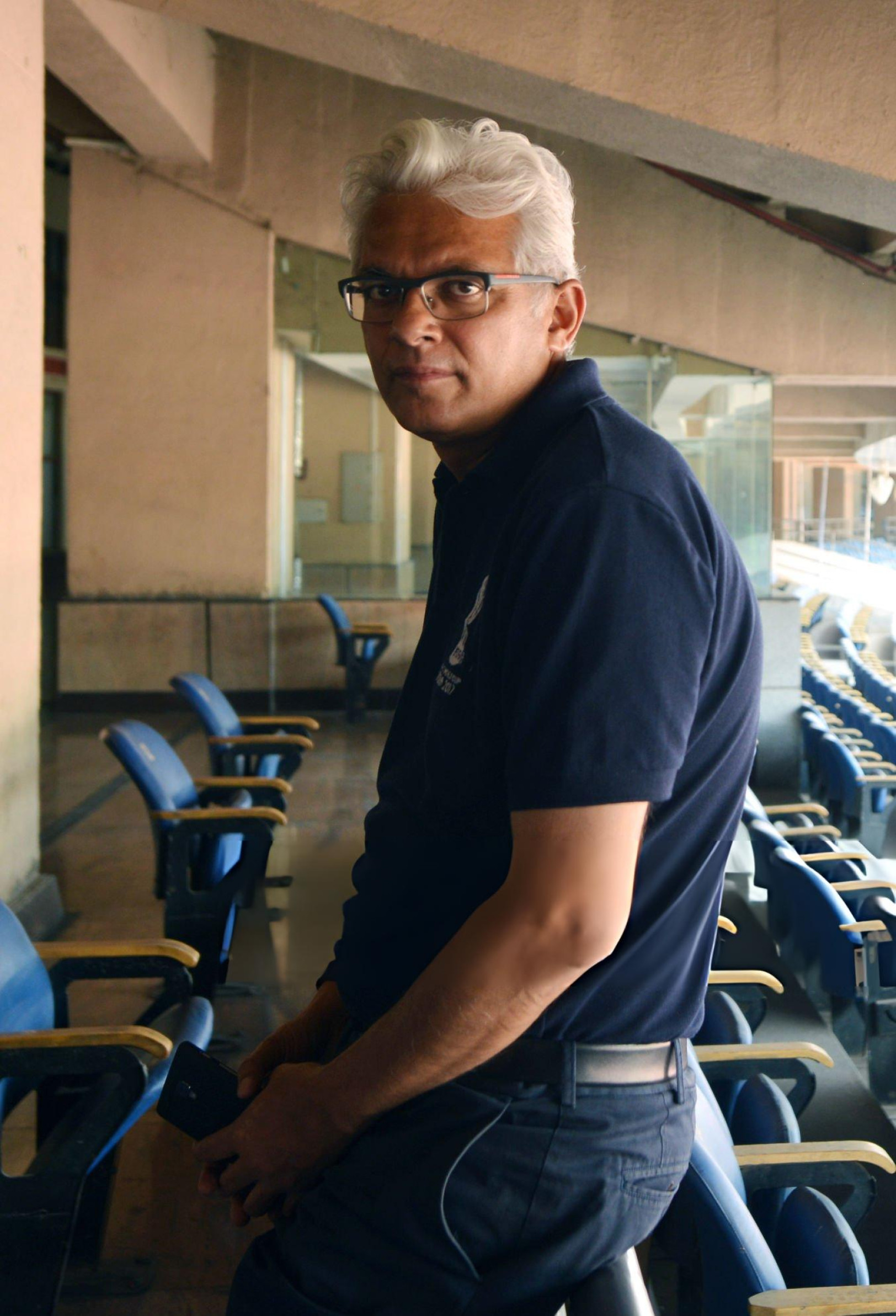
- Bhattacharjya at the U-17 FIFA World Cup
- Occupations: Quizzer; Orator; Writer; Sports producer
- Known for: Team Director of Kolkata Knight Riders; Project Director of FIFA U-17 World Cup

Joy Bhattacharjya is an Indian quizzer, orator, writer and sports producer.

== Career ==
Joy was the first Indian Head of Production of ESPN Star Sports in India in the early 2000s.

In 2006, he became head of Programming for the National Geographic Channel and The History Channel in India.

He was the Team Director of the Indian Premier League franchise Kolkata Knight Riders (KKR) when the League launched in 2008.

He has also served as the director for the FIFA U-17 World Cup, which was conducted in India,

He later became the CEO of the inaugural Pro Volleyball League.

On 15 July 2022, Federation of Indian Fantasy Sports FIFS named Joy Bhattacharjya as Director-General
