= Bangladesh Youth Development and Electronic Sports Association =

Esports governing body in Bangladesh

Bangladesh Youth Development & Electronic Sports Association
- বাংলাদেশ ইয়ুথ ডেভেলপমেন্ট অ্যান্ড ইলেকট্রনিক স্পোর্টস অ্যাসোসিয়েশন
- Sport: Electronic sports
- Jurisdiction: Bangladesh
- Abbreviation: BYDESA
- Founded: 2021; 5 years ago
- Affiliation: International Esports Federation; Global Esports Federation
- Regional affiliation: Asian Electronic Sports Federation
- Headquarters: Dhaka, Bangladesh
- President: Brigadier General Md. Munirul Islam
- Vice presidents: Susmit Rashid; Md. Ahetesham Talukdar; Hasanul Islam
- Secretary: Aga Rafsan Chowdhury

Official website
- www.bydesa.org
- (Bangladesh)

The Bangladesh Youth Development & Electronic Sports Association (BYDESA) is the governing body for esports in Bangladesh. It is a member of the International Esports Federation (IESF), Global Esports Federation (GEF), Asian Electronic Sports Federation (AESF), World Phygital Community, and the Network of Academic and Scholastic Esports Federations.

In 2023, BYDESA hosted and participated in various international esports events, including the IESF World Esports Championships, Global Esports Games 2023, and Asian Games regional qualification activities.

== Executive Committee ==
Position	Name(s)
President	Brigadier General Md. Munirul Islam
Vice presidents	Susmit Rashid; Md. Ahetesham Talukdar; Hasanul Islam
General secretary	Aga Rafsan Chowdhury
Joint secretaries	Rijvi Ahmed Hredoy; Ifty Azad; Md. Nazmul Alif
Treasurer	Kazi Fazlay Rabby
Office secretaries	Kaiser Fahim; Farid Tasnimul Islam; Mohammad Mehraj Mahdin
Organizing secretaries	Himalay Islam; Mohammad Shahnewaz; Tazrian Hossain Taz
Publication Secretaries	Md. Nafiul Islam; Abdul Ahad Robin; Nazmus Sakib
Publicity secretaries	Kazi Arafat Hossain; Mohammad Imran Ali; Fahmidul Hasan Fuad
Secretaries of women affairs	Meher Zabin; Rohana Rashid; Nusrat Jahan
