= European Gaming and Betting Association =

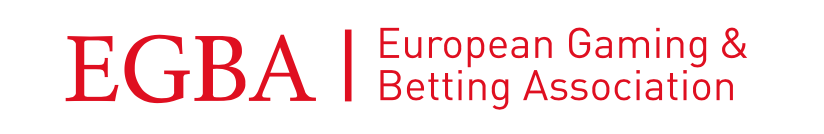

The European Gaming and Betting Association (EGBA) is the Brussels-based trade association representing the leading online gambling operators established, licensed and regulated within the EU. EGBA works together with national and EU authorities and other stakeholders towards a well-regulated and well-channelled online gambling market which provides a high level of consumer protection and takes account of the realities of the internet and online consumer demand. In 2021, EGBA's member companies had 225 online gambling licenses to provide their services to 29,8 million customers across 21 different European countries.

EGBA is registered to the EU Transparency Register since 2009 with the number 29508582413-52.

== History ==
EGBA started in as EBA, European Betting Association which was created in February 2004 by Per-Ivan Selinder, CEO of Expekt.com and Norbert Teufelberger CEO of Betandwin.com on behalf of the founding members, Expekt.com, Betandwin.com, Unibet.com and Goldbet.com. Torbjörn Ihre was the first Secretary-General. In parallel they also started a cooperation between the four founding members for sports integrity, today International Betting Integrity Association, IBIA.

In February 2007 EBA changed to EGBA to include casino focused members and Sigrid Ligné, took over as Secretary-General.

Maarten Haijer serves as the association's 3rd Secretary-General since April 2013.

== Membership ==
EGBA is a member-driven association which works closely with its members, on a daily basis, to ensure regulatory and market development outcomes – at both EU and national-level – which support a well-regulated and competitive European online gambling sector. Membership is open to online gambling companies who are established in the EU/EEA and can subscribe to the association’s values.

EGBA currently has six member companies:

- bet365
- Betsson
- Entain
- Flutter Entertainment
- Kindred Group
- William Hill

== Objectives ==
A key objective of EGBA is to promote a sustainable online gambling sector where customers can participate in online gambling inside a safe and well-regulated environment. To support this, EGBA members adhere to an set of European industry standards to complement the many different and stringent consumer protection regulations in the European countries where they operate.

== Europe's online gambling sector ==
Europe’s gambling market revenue reached €108,5bn gross gaming revenue in 2022, an 8% increase compared to pre-pandemic levels in 2019 and a 23% rise compared to 2021. This growth was driven mainly by the reopening of land-based gambling venues following the pandemic, with land-based gross gaming revenue increasing 34% to €70,3bn in 2022, accounting for 65% of total gambling revenue. Meanwhile, online gambling revenue increased by 8% to €38,2bn gross gaming revenue, or 35% of Europe’s total gambling revenue.

== Actions and partnerships ==
=== Annual data collection ===
EGBA publishes yearly data about the EU online gambling sector, in partnership with its members and H2 Gambling Capital. In 2021, EGBA members had a combined €11,6bn in online gambling GGR, accounting for 33% of Europe’s total online gambling revenue that year. Sports betting accounted for 46% of EGBA members' online gambling GGR, followed by online casino at 45%.

=== Yearly Sustainability Report ===
Each year, EGBA publishes its annual Sustainability Report which outlines the joint efforts and progress made by EGBA and its members to promote safe and sustainable gambling and contribute positively to society in Europe. The latest edition of the report showed that EGBA members sent more than 20 million personalised safer gambling communications to their customers in 2021, reflecting their more targeted and personalised approach to safer gambling.

=== European Safer Gambling Week ===
EGBA organises a yearly "European Safer Gambling Week" which is an annual cross-border initiative to promote safer gambling in Europe. Established in 2021, the initiative is supported by a group of European online gambling associations, including EGBA and its members, who come together each year to encourage open and honest conversations about safer gambling in Europe. In 2022, the initiative ramped up its impact in its second year with 24 events organised and safer gambling messages shared on social media across 17 EU member states – achieving 1.5 million impressions which is a 400% increase from 2021.

=== European online gambling associations platform ===
EGBA maintains a European online gambling associations platform with national associations, which was jointly established in 2019. The platform brings together 24 trade bodies to share knowledge, experiences, and best practices. It meets regularly and provides a platform for joint industry actions, including the annual European Safer Gambling Week.

=== CEN Workshop agreement ===
All EGBA operators adhere to the Workshop Agreement on "Responsible Remote Gambling Measures" published by the European Committee for Standardization (CEN). In the absence of pan-European regulations on gambling, the CEN workshop agreement provides a list of evidence-based, self-regulatory measures that gambling companies can adopt to create a safe and secure environment for their players. The compliance of EGBA members with this CEN standard is independently audited and verified each year by eCOGRA, a London-based ISO/IEC 17025 accredited testing agency and player protection and standards organisation.

=== Sports integrity ===
EGBA members are required to be members of the International Betting Integrity Association (IBIA) which supports the integrity of sports by driving industry efforts in the fight against betting-related match-fixing and corruption. The association has established an alert platform and information sharing agreements with leading governing bodies of sports, including FIFA and the IOC.
