= Studio Oleomingus =

- Industry: Video games
- Founded: 2014; 12 years ago
- Headquarters: Chala, Gujarat, India
- Key people: Dhruv Jani and Sushant Chakraborty
- Products: Somewhere
- Website: oleomingus.com

Studio Oleomingus is a two-person video game development studio based in Chala, Gujarat, India. It was founded in 2014 and is composed of Dhruv Jani, an alumnus of the National Institute of Design, and Sushant Chakraborty. Its work is primarily in the genre of postcolonial interactive fiction and explored through the medium of a first-person walking simulator. It has also hosted interactive art exhibitions in this medium at the Jawahar Kala Kendra and the Victoria and Albert Museum. Much of Oleomingus's output is part of a larger narrative called Somewhere about the search for a mythical city called Kayamgadh, and each individual work can be experienced as a short story in this narrative.
