= Arena of Valor =

Multiplayer online battle arena video game

- Developer: TiMi Studio Group
- Publisher: Level Infinite
- Producers: Ray Ning (Executive Producer)
- Engine: Unity
- Platforms: Android; iOS; iPadOS; Nintendo Switch
- Release: Android, iOS: TWN: October 12, 2016; VNM: November 21, 2016; THA: December 26, 2016; EU: August 10, 2017; NA: December 19, 2017; AU: June 28, 2018; Nintendo Switch: WW: September 25, 2018
- Genre: Multiplayer online battle arena
- Mode: Multiplayer

Arena of Valor (Chinese: 傳說對決; pinyin: Chuánshuō Duìjué, Thai: เรียล์มออฟเวเลอร์ (อาร์โอวี), lit. 'Realm of Valor (RoV)', Vietnamese: Liên Quân Mobile), formerly Strike of Kings, is an international adaptation of Honor of Kings (Chinese: 王者荣耀; pinyin: Wángzhě Róngyào), (Note: Later, Honor of Kings was released globally on June 20, 2024, as a replacement, with some of Arena of Valor heroes incorporated into the Global version.) a multiplayer online battle arena developed by TiMi Studio Group and published by Level Infinite for Android, iOS and Nintendo Switch for markets outside mainland China

In Thailand known as ROV- with features themes and characters that have been updated to suit Southeast Asian and Western preferences. Even sharing heroes in the Honor of Kings International Championship (KIC), AoV was formerly the official international rival.

As of September 2018, the game has grossed over $140 million outside China. Arena of Valor was one of the esports titles featured at the 2018 Asian Games, 2019 Southeast Asian Games, 2021 Asian Indoor and Martial Arts Games, and 2021 SEA Games as part of the competitive sport. Arena of Valor was published in other regions by Garena, DeNA, Actoz SG, and TiMi Studio Group.

== Gameplay ==
Arena of Valor is a multiplayer online battle arena (MOBA) game developed for mobile. The overall gameplay of Arena of Valor highly resembles League of Legends, a MOBA game on PC developed and published by Riot Games, which is also a subsidiary of Tencent and a sister company to TiMi.

Players control characters known as heroes, each possessing a unique set of abilities.There are more than 100 heroes in Arena of Valor, and they are all divided into different categories including marksmen, tanks, assassins, and magicians. Each of the three lanes on the game's map leads to the enemy's base, which is home to the Nexus.

Heroes begin the game at a low level and can earn gold and experience (XP) through various means: killing non-player creatures such as minions or monsters, vanquishing other players, destroying structures, passively over time, and via special items that can be purchased in the shop. Earning experience unlocks and enhances abilities, making the hero more powerful. Items bought in the shop do not carry over to subsequent matches, ensuring that all players start each match on equal footing.

Matches give players rewards, such as gold, which can then be used to buy a variety of heroes or arcana. In addition to this, players can play a 'Ranked' match type, which allows them to be matched with players who are at their skill level and be assessed through in-game 'ranks'. Stars are earned for a victory and lost when the player loses.

=== Game modes ===
There are various game modes in Arena of Valor, with "5v5" most commonly referred to as Grand Battle or Ranked Match, played on the Antaris Battlefield and being the most popular. Players compete in these matches which on average last for around 12 – 18 minutes. Players aim to destroy the enemy's turrets on the map and secure objectives such as killing Abyssal Dragon and Dark Slayer, with the victory condition being to destroy the enemy's core.

Black City Arena is a 1v1 game mode with only one lane, two brushes at the left and right side of the horizontal battlefield, an HP pot, one tower, and one core for blue and red. Shadow Duel is a 3v3 game mode on Flatland Battlefield, using a much smaller map.

Abyssal Clash is a 5v5 game mode where players are given randomly selected heroes. Players may choose to re-roll once and receive a different hero. The game map, Abyss Canyon, only has one lane, with two turrets and a core base connected at either end of the lane. There are certain restrictions which do not appear in the default 5v5 mode: Items may only be purchased before leaving the base or upon death and hero healing at the team base is disabled. There are health regeneration runes that appear next to each turret, which provide heroes with a small regeneration effect.

Hook Wars is one of the arcade game modes. The game map, Treasure Bay, is made up of two large connected vessels. Although this game mode is also 5v5, there are no minions, turrets, or bases in this mode. Each player is able to use a Hook as a special ability, which can grab an enemy on the opposite boat or from long distances. Players aim to capture the Control Zone, located at the center of the map, and hold the zone for a certain duration (until the counter reaches 100%). The capture rate increases with the number of players standing within the zone.

Football Fever is a 3v3, arcade game mode. Death Match is a 2v2v2v2v2 arcade game mode on a game map known as Death Realm. Gladiator's Summit is a 5v5, arcade game mode. Mayhem Mode is a 10v10, arcade game mode. Duo-Race is a co-op racing mode.

=== Hero types ===
There are 130 heroes in Arena of Valor as of November , 2026. Arena of Valor divides the heroes into numerous categories that each play different roles. The most notable difference is the type of damage a hero deals - some heroes deal physical damage, which can be countered by the armor stat, whilst other heroes deal mainly magic damage, which is countered by the magic resistance stat. Some heroes deal both types of damage, and some deal 'true' damage, which cannot be countered by either armor or magic resistance. All heroes are classified as one of six categories, with some heroes overlapping multiple categories.

- Marksman: Also known as "AD Carry/ADC", marksmen are ranged heroes that usually deal physical damage mostly through their auto attack. This hero type deals sustained damage, and therefore is useful in teamfights in order to reduce the opponent's health. They are also very efficient in taking objectives such as turrets. However, they are often fragile and vulnerable. Examples of marksmen are Violet, Valhein, Yorn, and Stuart (formerly the Joker).
- Mage: Mages are sometimes known as "AP Carry/APC". These heroes deal a high amount of burst magic damage. Some mages are fragile while some mages are more durable depending on the respective itemization. Mages are a mix of ranged heroes, which deal damage from afar, or melee heroes, which deal damage from close distances. Examples of mages are Raz, Krixi, and Zata.
- Assassin: These are heroes that are designed to deal large amounts of damage quickly, and often do not have much health. Assassins often search for the enemy marksman or mage as well as any other fragile heroes to eliminate quickly. They are also responsible for shutting down enemies that are on a killing spree. They have high mobility and burst damage for focusing valuable enemy targets. Examples of assassins are Wukong, Zill, and Sinestrea.
- Tank: Tanks are heroes that have large amounts of HP and usually build completely defensive to be able to soak damage for the team. As a result, they often deal little damage. However, they often have abilities known as 'crowd control' that allow them to inhibit the movement of the enemy team. In addition to this, they can use these abilities to initiate a teamfight, or to prevent the enemy team from attacking high priority targets such as an ally marksman or mage. Examples of tanks are Roxie, Thane, and Toro.
- Warrior: Heroes that blend the attributes of damage dealer and tank, combining moderate survivability with respectable damage. Warriors usually have a balanced amount of health, defense, and attack damage, which is a common designation for close-range melee duelists. Thus, they are able to survive long periods of fighting and excel in doing continuous sustained damage. Warriors are all-rounded and tend to be extremely strong in 1v1 scenarios. Examples of warriors are Florentino, Yena, and Lu Bu.
- Support: Heroes whose abilities aid the rest of the team by providing healing, buffing allies (such as movement speed buffs), debuffing the enemy team (such as stunning), or a combination of the above. Support heroes are often paired with the marksman in the early laning phase of the game where the support doesn't kill minions but instead focuses on aiding their partner and harassing the enemy heroes. Support heroes usually aid ally marksmen as they are often weaker during the early phase of the game and need assistance in order to survive. Examples of supports are Alice, Lumburr, and Krizzix.

Some heroes are classified as two different categories, making them a hybrid between two different roles which reflects in their playstyle. Some examples of hybrids include Liliana (a hybrid between a mage and assassin), Volkath (a hybrid between a warrior and assassin) and Omega (a hybrid between a tank and support). These types of heroes have the abilities befitting of both classes, and may fulfill either of their two classified roles in the team.

Players can purchase items, which make a large impact on the hero stats and playstyle. An example of this is Zephys, a dual warrior/assassin class. He has a passive ability that increases damage reduction against incoming damage based on a proportion of health lost. If only offensive items are bought, he will deal a lot of damage but will have a low amount of health and defense, which impacts survivability. If Zephys purchases a mix of offensive and defensive items, he can take damage for the team while still dealing a noticeable amount of damage. If Zephys buys only defensive items, he can boost his damage reduction passive to its maximum potential, being literally almost impossible to die in most circumstances like a Tank class character, but will deal drastically lower amounts of damage. This kind of playstyle can be applied to all heroes, allowing tanks to act as warriors, mages to act as supports, and vice versa.

== History ==
=== Pre-release ===
After Tencent fully acquired Riot Games in 2015, Tencent asked them to make a mobile version of League of Legends, as multiplayer online battle arena (MOBA) games were very rare on mobile at the time, with Vainglory by Super Evil Megacorp (which was formed by ex-Riot Games employees) being the only notable title. Tencent wanted to seize the opportunity to dominate the mobile market because there were not any strong competitors aside from Vainglory. However, Riot Games declined due to mobile not commonly being seen as the platform for competitive games, and claimed that the gameplay of League of Legends could not be replicated on smartphones. Be that as it may, Tencent was still determined to launch a MOBA game on mobile. After receiving the refusal from Riot Games, Lightspeed & Quantum Studios (which would later develop PUBG Mobile under license from Krafton) and TiMi Studios (both of which are Tencent's internal video game development studios) raced to develop a MOBA game that fit the bill, resulting an internal competition.

Lightspeed & Quantum's We MOBA and TiMi's League of Kings (rough translation from 王者联盟 Wángzhě Liánméng) were launched on the same day, on August 18, 2015. A month later, We MOBA was already the third most downloaded mobile game on Apple's iOS worldwide, according to app analytics firm App Annie, while League of Kings was nowhere near We MOBA. League of Kings was then taken down for an overhaul, and was relaunched in October 2015. TiMi Studios used League of Legends as a base model to overhaul League of Kings, resulting in both games having a lot of similarities. TiMi Studios also implemented a 5v5 game mode into League of Kings due to the game previously having poor reception with the 3v3 concept. This time, League of Kings successfully overtook We MOBA and won the internal competition. Tencent relished and invested additional resources into League of Kings to ensure its success.

Nevertheless, Riot Games deemed that the design of characters and abilities in League of Kings were "blatantly ripping off the intellectual property of League of Legends" after they discovered how the game was produced, and reportedly brought these concerns to Tencent. Tencent responded that they would change its own game enough to sell as a standalone product with no relation to League of Legends. Despite this, League of Kings had already gained massive popularity in China at this point due to the game being advertised as "mobile version of League of Legends" through social media and word-of-mouth marketing. Tencent felt that it was too late to make huge changes to the game, so they renamed League of Kings (王者联盟; Wángzhě Liánméng) to Honor of Kings (王者荣耀; Wángzhě Róngyào) on November 26, 2015, and it only went through necessary changes. The international release of Honor of Kings was canceled, and the game would have a western twin for markets outside mainland China which is rebranded and featured different contents, leading to the creation of Arena of Valor, which also served as a response to Riot Games's complaints of "potential intellectual property infringement".

=== Development ===
Arena of Valor was developed by TiMi Studio Group with the same engine and user interface design as Honor of Kings and published by Level Infinite. A subsidiary at Tencent Interactive Entertainment Group, headed under the Tencent Games division. Arena of Valor originally was named Strike of Kings, and was intended to be the identical name to Honor of Kings, but the publishing team thought the name might not be suitable to appeal to the Western audience. Moreover, the difference in content featured in the game made the publishing team decide that a better name is required. Still, Arena of Valor has several alternative names when released in different countries, such as Realm of Valor in Thailand, Liên Quân in Vietnam, Penta Storm in South Korea, and Legendary Showdown in Taiwan and Japan.

Garena joined the marketing team as they helped to westernize the atmosphere of the game. The in-game characters have been swapped from characters inspired by Chinese folklore and Chinese mythology, to characters inspired by European folklore and several mythologies from other nations, blending a variety of elements including Lovecraftian horror, steampunk, high fantasy, and sword and sorcery to appeal audiences outside China.

The appearance of in-game characters mostly recycled and revamped designs of characters from Heroes of Newerth, a MOBA game that Garena had acquired from S2 Games. Arena of Valor also included several characters such as Butterfly, Violet, and Mina from Age of Gunslingers, a third-person shooter game that previously was also developed by a division of TiMi Studio Group. Additionally, Arena of Valor has multiple collaborations with other franchises, having crossovers with DC Universe, Wiro Sableng, Contra, KFC, Sword Art Online, Ultraman, Bleach, One-Punch Man, Demon Slayer: Kimetsu no Yaiba, Sailor Moon and Hunter × Hunter.

TiMi intended to feature characters from the Marvel Universe during the prototype stage of Strike of Kings (before the rebranding to Arena of Valor and collaboration with DC Comics), with the closed beta test of the game under the name of Marvel Super Heroes. The initial game featured some characters from TiMi's intellectual property crossover with Marvel's characters. However, Marvel Entertainment later took back their license, forcing TiMi to stop the development and Tencent Games to shut down the game as they lost the rights to release the game. Subsequently, TiMi Studio Group had to redesign the game, creating the current appearance of Arena of Valor. TiMi then approached DC Comics to include their characters as a replacement to Marvel's characters, while Marvel went a separate way, and collaborated with other video game developer companies to develop their own MOBA, such as Marvel End Time Arena by Smilegate, and Marvel Super War by NetEase.

The soundtrack for Arena of Valor was composed by TiMi Audio Lab in cooperation with different music composers each year, such as Jeff Broadbent in late 2016, Hans Zimmer and Lorne Balfe in 2017, Matthew Carl Earl and Obadiah Brown-Beach in 2018, Russell Brower, Paul Lipson, and Tom Salta in 2019, Yang Lee and Michal Cielecki in 2020, all creating a different atmosphere compared to the original score with Chinese music instruments in Honor of Kings. Arena of Valor also features The Veda language, a constructed fictional language along with its polypersonal descendants, such as Afata, Gandal (the "impure language" of humans), and G'vunna (Zudǝllǝ g'Vunnǝ, the "language from the abyss" of the Lokheim) for different characters from different factions. These languages were created by David J. Peterson (also well known for creating the Dothraki and Valyrian languages in Game of Thrones) to make the game more interesting.

Arena of Valor has a wide variety of publishers for different regions. Arena of Valor was first launched in Taiwan on October 12, 2016, by Garena, following a two-week closed beta testing period. On November 21, 2016, Garena launched Arena of Valor in Vietnam and become one of the most successful mobile games in this country. On December 26, 2016, Garena launched Arena of Valor in Thailand. On October 17, 2017, Garena launched Arena of Valor in Malaysia, Singapore, and the Philippines, where a majority of the gaming community plays mobile games. Garena decided to combine these three countries in one server. In South Korea, the game was published by Netmarble on April 26, 2017. The game was released in European markets by Level Infinite on August 10, 2017, and was released in North America and Latin America on December 19, 2017. On June 28, 2018, Level Infinite implemented "Asia server" unannounced. This server included Australia, New Zealand, Myanmar, Laos, Cambodia, and Brunei. In Japan, DeNA cooperated with TiMi to launch Arena of Valor on November 30, 2018.

Nintendo announced a deal with Tencent Games to bring Arena of Valor to the Nintendo Switch for international markets, as well as forming a partnership to ship Nintendo Switch consoles into China. The game was announced to be released for the Nintendo Switch during the September 2017 Nintendo Direct presentation. A closed beta became available for the platform on June 28, 2018, and participants received an in-game skin for one of the characters.

The game was officially launched on the platform on September 28, 2018. Speaking to Engadget, Tencent Games revealed the Nintendo Switch port of the game is enhanced and optimized for the platform, taking advantage of the console's processing power and hardware features to implement various changes to the game, such as improved graphics and animations, better lighting, smoother lines, and additional minute details like butterflies. Additionally, several adjustments were made to the game to be playable on a bigger screen with traditional controls, and stats for characters have been reconfigured. Because of these changes, cross-play between the Nintendo Switch and mobile versions of the game is not possible.

=== Post-release ===
In November 2015, the game was first published as Honor of Kings in China, where it swiftly gained popularity. TiMi Studios once again faced internal competition. Morefun Studios (which is also another of Tencent's video game development studio) developed and released a mobile MOBA named War Song on January 22, 2018, in an attempt to compete with Arena of Valor. However, War Song did not last long in the end. Instead, the assets of the defunct MOBA were recycled for Chess Rush, an auto battler game, which was released on July 4, 2019. It also debuted in North America and Europe in 2017 under the new name Arena of Valor for global markets. With regular updates that improve gameplay and include new content, like as heroes and skins, the game is accessible on iOS, Android, and the Nintendo Switch.

Arena of Valor was reported to have caused a gradually straining business relationship between Riot Games and Tencent, and the relationship between the two firms became further strained when Tencent used notable League of Legends players to promote Arena of Valor and its esports tournaments. Riot Games's complaints initiated a two-month marketing freeze for Arena of Valor and demanded that Riot Games be given the option to review all marketing plans, including a veto for the use of select celebrity gamers. Nonetheless, Riot Games implied that their relationship with Tencent is still strong, and the conflict between them and their games is only "a bump in the road". In July 2017, Riot Games filed a lawsuit against Moonton, the developer of the rival game Mobile Legends: Bang Bang, for copyright infringement, citing similarities between Mobile Legends and League of Legends. The case was initially dismissed in the Central District Court of California in the United States on account of forum non conveniens. Tencent, as Riot's parent company, then filed a new, separate lawsuit on behalf of Riot Games, directly targeting Moonton's CEO, Watson Xu Zhenhua (as he had previously worked in Tencent as one of Tencent's senior employee) in Shanghai No.1 Intermediate People's Court, for violating a law regarding Non-Compete Agreements, which ruled in Tencent's favor in July 2018, awarding Tencent a settlement of $2.9 million (RMB19.4 million). Riot Games eventually acknowledged the potential of the mobile market for the MOBA genre, and agreed to develop a mobile title for League of Legends. Tencent then temporarily pulled marketing plans for Arena of Valor in Europe and North America in 2019, clearing room for Riot Games's announcement a few months later. Riot Games announced their own mobile MOBA game, League of Legends: Wild Rift on October 16, 2019, which is the 10th anniversary of League of Legends. In addition, the succession of MOBA genre on mobile inspired the creation of Pokémon UNITE, a Pokémon spin-off game, developed by TiMi Studio as well in a further partnership with Nintendo and The Pokémon Company. The game was announced in a Pokémon Presents on June 24, 2020.

TiMi partnered with Shengqi Games to re-distribute the Arena of Valor franchise in the Indian market, where Arena of Valor has been suspended from operating earlier in Q4 of 2020 due to unsubstantiated privacy concerns claims through the Indian government. The franchise is branded Clash of Titans, with adjusted terms such as Titans, unlike the original franchises Hero terminology. The mobile app of Arena of Valor was banned in India (along with other Chinese apps) on September 2, 2020, by the government, the move came amid the 2020 China–India skirmish.

TiMi Studio Group decided to no longer extend the license rights of the Arena of Valor franchise to Netmarble & Kakao. Netmarble announced that they will terminate the service on July 29, 2022; after five years of game as a service (GaaS). The termination causes Korea to have no representation in eSports in 2022. The license was not extended due to a failure of player retention in South Korea.

== Esports ==
=== International competition ===
Arena of Valor tournaments have been held in numerous regions, with each region having their own local leagues such as Garena Challenger Series Pro League (GCS) in Taiwan, Realm of Valor Pro League (RPL) in Thailand, Arena of Glory – Đấu trường danh vọng (AOG) in Vietnam, Arena of Valor Star League (ASL) in Indonesia, Arena of Valor: Valor Cup (AVC) in Malaysia, Singapore and Philippines, Arena of Valor: Valor Series (AVS) in Europe, North America, and Latin America, and Arena of Valor Japan League (AJL) in Japan.

Arena of Valor also has two annual world championship tournaments; Arena of Valor International Championship (AIC) and Arena of Valor World Cup (AWC). AIC is a tournament where teams from across the world participate to earn profit and glory for their own esports organisation, while AWC is a tournament where teams participate under the banner of their national flag to represent their own country.

The first AIC was held in South Korea from November 23 to 26, 2017. The event attracted more than 36,000,000 online viewers, breaking mobile game records worldwide and has since become the leading standard of mobile esports. The game occupying the top positions of mobile game rankings in Asia for months has also received the honor of Google Play's Best of 2017 Game award in Europe. The second AIC tournament was held in Thailand from November 23 to December 16, 2018. The tournament increased the number of competing teams to 16, with teams competing for the title and a proportion of the prize pool worth $600,000 (£460,000). The third AIC tournament was also held in Thailand from November 5 to 24, 2019. It featured an additional all-new 1v1 competition, where one player represented each team and the winner walked away with $5,000.

The first Arena of Valor World Cup (AWC) tournament was held in Los Angeles, United States, from July 17 to 28, 2018. A total prize pool of $500,000 made AWC one of the largest mobile esports tournaments in gaming history. A total of nine regions competed for the grand prize, which includes Taiwan – Hong Kong – Macau, Thailand, Vietnam, Malaysia – Singapore – Philippines, Indonesia, South Korea, North America, Latin America and Europe. Additionally, the tournament host selected three Wildcard teams to participate in AWC. The second AWC tournament was held in Da Nang, Vietnam, from June 27 to July 14, 2019, with the same total prize pool of $500,000. The second AWC also marks Japan's first participation in the Arena of Valor international tournament since the game introduced their Japanese server on November 30, 2018.

The Arena of Valor World Cup 2020 was canceled due to the COVID-19 pandemic, and was replaced by the one-off Arena of Valor Premier League 2020 (APL 2020).

On August 28, 2021, Level Infinite and TiMi eSports announced the merge of the Honor of Kings World Champion Cup, the world championship of AoV's Chinese counterpart Honor of Kings, with the Arena of Valor World Cup. As a result, the prize pool will be increased dramatically from $500,000 to $10,000,000 from the 2022 edition. The AIC 2021 prize pool has been increased from $500,000 to $1,000,000 and will be increased from $1,000,000 to $2,000,000 starting AIC 2022.

=== Asian Games 2018 ===
Arena of Valor was part of the esports demonstration event at the Asian Games 2018 held in Indonesia. Eight countries were able to participate after qualifying from their respective regional qualification, with Indonesia automatically qualifying as host. Unlike other electronic sports events, there is no qualification for Central and West Asia.

=== Southeast Asian Games 2019 ===
Arena of Valor was among the game titles included as a medal event at the 2019 Southeast Asian Games.

=== Southeast Asian Games 2021 ===
Arena of Valor (Vietnamese: Liên Quân) was among the game titles included as a medal event at the 2021 Southeast Asian Games, along with two similar games League of Legends (Vietnamese: Liên Minh Huyền Thoại) and League of Legends: Wild Rift (Vietnamese: Liên Minh Huyền Thoại: Tốc Chiến).

=== Asian Games 2022 ===
Arena of Valor is among the eight esports titles determined as medal events for the Asian Games 2022. Tencent Esports and TiMi eSports shared a publication on September 5, 2021, which confirmed the first time usage of the merged version of Honor of Kings with Arena of Valor.

=== Southeast Asian Games 2025 ===
An important turning point for Arena of Valor (AoV) esports was reached at the 33rd Southeast Asian Games in Bangkok. A tournament exceeded one million peak concurrent viewers for the first time in the franchise's history, peaking at 1,042,982 during the Men's Grand Final between Vietnam and Thailand. Over 3.51 million hours were viewed during this enormous interaction, which was mostly driven by Vietnamese streaming services and TikTok Live records.

In terms of structure, the tournament added a historic Women's division to the Men's competition. Team Vietnam won two gold medals at the end of both divisions. The women's team won the tournament without dropping a single game thanks to their complete dominance. Additionally, the Olympic Council of Asia used the Infinix GT 30 Pro as the official smartphone device for the competition, standardizing the technical environment.

But during the women's division, there was a serious controversy involving the event's competitive integrity. A Thai athlete tried to allow an off-site accomplice to covertly play in her place by using unapproved software and external communication equipment. This led to the Thai team's complete withdrawal from Garena, an instant lifelong ban from competition, and the first-ever criminal convictions under Thai computer-abuse statutes in March 2026.

== Cultural localization and impact ==
Arena of Valor, also known as Realm of Valor or RoV in Thailand, uses a framework of deep localization and transcreation to build market domination and regional identity, especially in Southeast Asia, in contrast to usual worldwide video game standardizations. According to academic assessments by media and game studies scholars, the game serves as a vehicle for both localized cultural representation and global digital diplomacy.

=== Content transcreation and cultural representation ===
Arena of Valor deviates considerably from straightforward textual translation, according to research on video game localization frameworks. Instead, in order to transform the foreign program into a locally relevant media artifact, the developers alter character esthetics, audio realia, and area licensing—for example, by including components from local folklore and high-profile crossovers. An academic research that was published in the subject of language and culture studies in 2024 looked at how these "transcreative" modifications affect structural Chinese entertainment items to make them useful venues for cross-cultural communication. As seen by regional viewership topping one million concurrent users during its official esports incarnations, studies have clearly connected the inclusion of these local qualities to surges in brand loyalty and domestic audience retention.

=== Digital diplomacy and soft power ===
Arena of Valor has gained popularity in the study of contemporary esports diplomacy since it was modified from its Chinese domestic version, Honor of Kings. The deliberate use of the game as a vehicle for national image projection was mapped by a thorough qualitative analysis that tracked more than 5,300 structural messages from official publisher channels. In order to project contemporary technological soft power throughout the Southeast Asian market, the international Arena of Valor variation is optimized to prioritize community-building, local influencer outreach, and cross-border esports ecosystem development, whereas the Chinese domestic version explicitly focuses on state-supported cultural imagery and traditional themes in accordance with regional ministries.

=== Institutional impact via multi-sport event ===
Due to its participation as an official medal sport in competitions like the Southeast Asian (SEA) Games since 2019, Arena of Valor's institutional influence extends into sports administration and regional politics. According to socio-political research, host countries aggressively take advantage of mobile MOB's regional appeal.In order to promote regional reciprocity and negotiate the development of digital infrastructure, the digital game should be positioned as a structured contributor to sustainable socio-economic ecosystems inside emerging digital marketplaces.

== Reception ==
Both reviewers and players have given Arena of Valor favorable reviews, praising its captivating gameplay, diverse cast of characters, and excellent visuals. At numerous gaming events, it has received multiple honors, including Best Mobile Game. In the mobile gaming industry, the game is frequently used as a model for other MOBAs, and its popularity has influenced the creation of games that are comparable.

One of the most financially successful mobile games in the region's history, "Arena of Valor" is said to have dominated Asian app stores and received downloads from 25% of Taiwan's entire population. When international broadcasts for tournaments like AWC 2019 amassed over 74 million view hours, the game cemented its position as a mobile esports powerhouse. World-famous composers Hans Zimmer and Lorne Balfe's original audio music for the film won Best Original music (Mobile) at the 2017 Hollywood Music in Media Awards, both artistically and commercially. In addition to receiving Google Play "Best of 2017" awards in several nations, the title expanded its global sports reach by being an official medal discipline at the Asian Game and SEA Games.

== Accolades ==
Arena of Valor won the award for "Best Music in a Casual/Social Game" at the 15th Annual Game Audio Network Guild Awards, whereas its other nomination was for "Best Original Instrumental". It was also nominated for "Original Score – Video Game" at the 2017 Hollywood Music in Media Awards, for "Original Dramatic Score, New IP" at the NAVGTR Awards, for "Best Competitive Game" at the 2018 Golden Joystick Awards, and for "Fan Favorite Mobile Game" at the Gamers' Choice Awards. Arena of Valor: Flip the World won the award for "Song/Score - Mobile Video Game" at the 9th Hollywood Music in Media Awards, while the game itself and Honor of Kings 2.0 were nominated for the same category at the 10th Hollywood Music in Media Awards. The game was also nominated for "Best Mobile Sport" at the Pocket Gamer Mobile Games Awards, while Honor of Kings 2.0 won the award for "Best Music in a Casual Game" at the 18th Annual Game Audio Network Guild Awards, whereas its other nomination was for "Best Sound Design in a Casual/Social Game".
