= Gambling in India =

Indian social issue

Gambling in India varies by state; states are entitled to formulate their own laws regarding gambling activities. Some states, like Goa, have legalized casinos. Common gambling activities like organized betting are restricted except for selective categories, including lottery and horse racing. In 2026, a national regulatory framework for online gaming came into force under the Promotion and Regulation of Online Gaming Act, 2025, prohibiting online money games while providing for the regulation of e-sports and online social games.

In the 21st century, more people have betting and gambling activities in India. Critics of gambling claim that it leads to crime, corruption, and money laundering. However, proponents of regulated gambling argue that it can be a huge source of revenue for the state. Casinos in Goa contributed ₹135 crores to the state revenue in 2013. Recently published research revealed that Maharashtra state supplies the most online casino players in the country.

Casinos now operate in Goa, Daman, and Sikkim.

== Legality and legislation ==
Gambling falls under the jurisdiction of individual states, with only Indian states empowered to legislate on gambling within their boundaries. The Public Gambling Act of 1867, a central legislation, specifically prohibits the operation or management of public gambling establishments. Violation of this law carries a penalty of a ₹200 fine or imprisonment for up to three months. Additionally, the Act prohibits visiting gambling establishments, with a penalty of ₹100 fine or imprisonment for up to one month.

Indian law classifies games into two broad categories viz. game of skill and game of chance. The Supreme Court of India has held:

The game of Rummy is not a game entirely of chance like the 'three-card' game mentioned in the Madras case to which we were referred. The 'three cards' game which goes under different names such as 'flush', 'brag' etc. is a game of pure chance. Rummy, on the other hand, requires a certain amount of skill because the fall of the cards has to be memorized and the building up of Rummy requires considerable skill in holding and discarding cards. We cannot, therefore, say that the game of Rummy is a game of entire chance. It is mainly and preponderantly a game of skill.

The Information Technology Act 2000 regulates cyber activities in India but does not mention the words Gambling or Betting thereby the act was left for interpretation by the Courts which have refused to examine the matter. Further, online gambling is a banned offense in the state of Maharashtra under the "Bombay Wager Act".

Only three states, Goa, Daman, and Sikkim, allow casinos. There are two casinos in Sikkim called Casino Sikkim and Casino Mahjong and ten in Goa, of which six are land-based and four are floating casinos that operate on the Mandovi River. The floating casinos in Goa are Casino Deltin Royale, Casino Deltin JAQK, Casino Pride, and Casino Pride 2. While the first two are controlled by the Deltin Group, the latter two are managed by the Pride Group. According to the Goa, Daman, and Diu Public Gambling Act, 1976 casinos can be set up only at five-star hotels or offshore vessels with the prior permission of the government. This has led the Deltin Group to open the first land-based Casino in Daman which is open now. News reports also suggest that Visakhapatnam is also being looked at as the next casino destination.

Despite the existing prohibitive legislation, there is extensive illegal gambling throughout the country. The Indian gambling market is estimated to be worth US$60 billion per year, of which about half is illegally bet. According to the Indian National Newspaper, the chief executive officer of the International Cricket Council (ICC) said he was in favor of legalising betting in sports. He believes the illegal funds profited are through underground bookies that used the money to fund terrorism and drugs. Several Indian institutions have suggested that betting should be regulated and taxed. These include the Committee on Reforms in Cricket in 2015, the Law Commission of India in 2018, and court judgements from the Supreme Court. Many Indian professionals, as well as online forums, have urged the government to introduce legal but regulated gambling in India to bring the gambling economy out of the grip of mafia and underground dons.

The Public Gambling Act of 1867 is legislation aimed at addressing the regulation and penalization of public gambling activities as well as the operation of common gaming houses within India.

The Prize Competition Act of 1955, was passed by Parliament in 1955 to restrict gambling activities that awarded prizes as winnings. According to the Prize Competition Act, any prize competition where a prize is offered for solving a puzzle, number, alphabet, crossword, missing word, or picture prize competitions, where the winnings more than ₹1,000 shall be banned.

The Information Technology Act of 2000, regulates cyber activities within India, notably does not explicitly address matters related to gambling or betting. Consequently, the interpretation of its provisions regarding gambling has been left to the courts, which have thus far declined to adjudicate on the issue.

In 2022, the Indian government announced its plan to create a new gaming bill to replace the Public Gambling Act of 1867.

In 2026, the Supreme court upheld ban on online gambling in Karnataka and Tamil Nadu.

== Advertising gambling in India ==
Indian government does allow the promotion of online or physical gambling based on luck or chance. Promotion of Rummy, ludo and fantasy sports which are games of skill are allowed. Promotion of Physical gambling establishments is not allowed on online channels.

== Online gambling ==
Online gambling is in its infancy in India. Historically, online gambling in India was primarily regulated at the state level, with several states introducing explicit restrictions on online betting before the adoption of a national framework in 2025. Regulations like the Public Gambling Act of 1867 are still in place. However, there are not any cases on record of Indian players being prosecuted for online betting. Betting on cricket is especially popular, leading to concerns of increasing gambling addiction.

In 2010, Sikkim planned to offer three online gambling licenses. Certain forms of regulated gambling and online gaming were permitted in jurisdictions such as Goa, Daman and Sikkim under their respective state-level frameworks. At the time, it was anticipated that other states might adopt similar regulatory frameworks. It was expected that other states would follow Sikkim, thereby opening up a major online gambling market, aka matka gambling, throughout India.

Before the introduction of the national online gaming framework, offshore gambling websites targeting Indian players operated in a legally uncertain environment, with regulation depending largely on state law and the nature of the gambling activity. Telangana and Andhra Pradesh subsequently introduced state-level prohibitions on online gambling, further restricting such activities within those states. Penalties under these state laws vary depending on the applicable legislation and offence.

On 1 May 2026, the Promotion and Regulation of Online Gaming Act, 2025 and the Promotion and Regulation of Online Gaming Rules, 2026 came into force, establishing a national regulatory framework for online gaming. The rules classify online games into categories including online money games, e-sports and online social games. Online money games, in which users pay fees or stakes with an expectation of monetary gain, are prohibited under the Act, while qualifying e-sports and social games may operate subject to registration and regulatory requirements. The framework also established the Online Gaming Authority of India (OGAI), under the Ministry of Electronics and Information Technology, to classify games, oversee registration, handle grievances and enforce the legislation. Registered gaming providers are required to implement measures such as age verification, parental controls, usage limits and grievance-redressal mechanisms.

== Physical gambling establishments ==
In accordance with the Public Gambling Act of 1867, Casinos are established in the city of Goa and Sikkim. Goa houses casinos both on land and off-shore. The Mandovi river in Panjim houses around 6 vessels (as of 2025) which are offshore casinos. This includes 3 casinos operated by Delta Corp, 2 Casinos operated by Pride Group and 1 Casino operated by Big Daddy.

== See also ==
- Matka gambling
- Delta Corp
