= Chris Chan =

Singaporean sports administrator (born 1950)

- Chan in 2013
- Born: 18 September 1950 (age 76)
- Education: Royal Military Academy Sandhurst
- Organizations: Singapore Premier League; Singapore National Olympic Committee; Global Esports Federation
- Awards: Silver Olympic Order (2010); Olympic Diploma of Merit (2016)
- Military career
- Allegiance: Singapore
- Branch: Singapore Army
- Rank: Lieutenant colonel

Christopher Chan Seng Heng (Note: Chinese: 曾成兴; Pe̍h-ōe-jī: Chan Sêng-heng) (born 18 September 1950) is a Singaporean sports administrator who was the first president of the Global Esports Federation, from 2019 until 2025. He was also the secretary-general of the Singapore National Olympic Council (SNOC) from 2002 to 2025.

== Early life ==
Christopher Chan Seng Heng was born on 18 September 1950. Chris Chan played for the Telok Kurau United Youth team in 1968, then joined the Royal Military Academy Sandhurst's team in 1971. Graduating from Sandhurst in 1973, he spent 28 years in the Singapore Armed Forces, rising to the rank of lieutenant colonel. He was a commando officer of the Singapore Army, but also managed the team of the 7th Brigade Guards formation.

== Career ==
By the time he stepped up to head the Singapore Premier League as CEO in December 1997, he was described as a "spear-fisherman, triathlete, and commando" by The Straits Times. He was chief executive of the league until 2002, and left the league to begin working as the secretary-general of the Singapore National Olympic Committee. Amid the controversy stemming from death sentence of Van Tuong Nguyen, Chan declined to comment after his country's participation of the 2006 Commonwealth Games was protested, preferring not to mix sport and politics. He repeated this latter sentiment in 2008, comparing the two topics to oil and water.

During his tenure, Singapore hosted the first Youth Olympic Games in 2010. He also received a Silver Olympic Order. Despite a favorable outcome at that year's Commonwealth Games, Singapore had an underwhelming performance at that year's Asian Games, with Chan reacting in confusion at the upset.

By 2012, the BBC noted that Singapore had not won any gold medals at the Olympics despite attending since 1948. It described Chan as attributing this issue to "the lack of a systemic and holistic approach toward identifying sporting talent" in the country. Singapore finally earned its first Olympic gold medal with Joseph Schooling's performance at the 2016 Summer Olympics. That same year, Chan was awarded the Olympic Diploma of Merit with two others for "significant contributions to the Olympic movement and sport in Singapore and internationally."

In 2019, he was elected as the founding president of the Global Esports Federation (GEF), and unanimously re-elected in 2024. Under Chan's presidency, the GEF "acquir[ed] an impressive number of members and partners," including the publishers Capcom, Konami, and Sega. Kenyan esports executive Ronny Lusigi endorsed Chan's 2024 reelection bid in an opinion piece in the Daily Nation. Former swimmer Mark Chay succeeded him as secretary-general of the SNOC in 2025. Chan resigned as president of the GEF in July that year and was succeeded by Paul J. Forster, whom Chan had previously appointed as chief operating officer.
