= Dream11 =

Indian fantasy sports platform

- Type: Private
- Industry: Fantasy sports
- Founded: 2008; 18 years ago
- Founders: Harsh Jain; Bhavit Sheth
- Headquarters: Mumbai, Maharashtra, India
- Area served: India
- Revenue: ▲₹6,384 crore (US$680 million) (FY23)
- Net income: ▲₹188 crore (US$20 million) (FY23)
- Owners: Sporta Technologies Pvt Ltd
- Number of employees: 800+ (September 2022)
- Parent: Dream Sports
- Website: www.dream11.com

Dream11 is an Indian fantasy sports platform that allows users to play daily fantasy sports contests, primarily in cricket. The platform allowed users to take part in paid and free contests by assembling a virtual team of real-life players, and score points based on those players' actual statistical performance on the field of play. Paid contests were discontinued in August 2025 after the Parliament of India passed the Promotion and Regulation of Online Gaming Act, 2025.

In April 2019, Dream11 became the first Indian fantasy sport company to become a unicorn. In November 2021, Dream11 was valued at $8 billion. In October 2023, Dream11 claimed to have 200 million users.

== History ==
Dream11 was co-founded by Harsh Jain (son of Indian businessman Anand Jain) and Bhavit Sheth in 2008. In 2012, they introduced freemium fantasy sports in India for cricket fans. In 2014, the company reported 1 million registered users, which grew to 2 million in 2016 and to 45 million in 2018.

In April 2019, Steadview Capital completed secondary investment in Dream11. Apart from Steadview, Dream11's investors included Kalaari Capital, Think Investments, Multiples Equity and Tencent. In April 2019, they launched FanCode, an ad-free multi-sport aggregator platform offering content, commerce and community engagement.

In 2021, Dream 11's parent company, Dream Sports raised $840 million in a funding round led by Tiger Global, D1 Capital, Falcon Edge, DST Global, and Redbird Capital.

== Legality ==
In 2017, a case was registered against the company in an Indian High Court. The court, in its ruling, stated that playing the Dream11 game involves superior knowledge, judgement and attention. The Court also held that "the element of skill" had a predominant influence on the outcome of the Dream11 game. However, the law does not allow fantasy sports in a few Indian states like Assam, Telangana and Andhra Pradesh. A challenge to this judgement was filed with the Supreme Court of India, which dismissed the appeal. The judgement provided legality to the company and allowed them to run their operations throughout the country.

In October 2021, Dream11 suspended its operations in Karnataka after the state prohibited online gambling, betting and wagering. In February 2022, Dream11 resumed operations in the state after the Karnataka High Court reversed the ban on online gambling and repealed a complaint lodged against the company.

Despite it being adjudged to be a "game of skill", experts believe that the company operates in the country's regulatory "grey area".

=== 2025 real money gaming ban ===
On 21 August 2025, after the Parliament of India passed an online gaming bill that outlawed all real money online games, Dream11 paused all paid contests on its platform, which accounted for over 90% of its revenue.

== Partnerships ==
In 2017, the company partnered with three leagues within cricket, football and basketball. Dream11 became the Official Fantasy Partner for Caribbean Premier League, Indian Super League and US professional basketball league National Basketball Association (NBA). Later in the year, they partnered with the Indian Super League as their official Fantasy Football Partner. In November 2017, the NBA, launched a fantasy basketball game in association with Dream11 and launched their official NBA fantasy game on their platform.

In 2018, Dream11 announced its partnership with International Cricket Council (ICC), Pro Kabaddi League, International Hockey Federation (FIH), WBBL and BBL. In 2018, through the above partnership, Dream11 introduced two new games on their platform viz., kabaddi and hockey.

In October 2019, New Zealand Cricket (NZC) announced Dream11 as the title sponsor for the Super Smash domestic Twenty20 competition. In January 2021, this partnership was extended for another six years until 2026.

On 18 August 2020, Dream11 won the title sponsorship rights for the 2020 Indian Premier League for ₹222 crore (US$29.96 million), after Vivo pulled out for the season.

On 30 June 2023, Dream11 acquired the lead jersey sponsorship rights of the Indian National Cricket Team from July 2023 till March 2026 for ₹358 crore.

== Financials ==
Year	Revenue (In crores)	Profits/Loss (In crores)	Source
FY 2018	224.6	-65.1	
FY 2019	775.4	-88	
FY 2020	2,120	181	
FY 2021	2,706	329	
FY 2022	3,480.75	142.86	
FY 2023	6,384	188	

== Brand ambassadors ==
The company had first signed commentator Harsha Bhogle as their brand ambassador in 2018 IPL.

Cricketer Mahendra Singh Dhoni was the brand ambassador of Dream11 and launched the "Dimaag se Dhoni" media campaign during the 2018 Indian Premier League.

In 2019, Dream11 signed up seven cricketers and partnered with seven Indian Premier League franchise as part of its multi-channel marketing campaign.

In March 2022, Dream11 announced actors Kartik Aaryan and Samantha Ruth Prabhu as their brand ambassadors. This was the first time that the company roped in celebrities outside of sports as their ambassadors. Dream11 also has Rohit Sharma, Rishabh Pant, Shikhar Dhawan, Hardik Pandya, Shreyas Iyer and Jasprit Bumrah as their cricket ambassadors.

== Format ==
Dream11 provides a fantasy gaming platform for multiple sports such as fantasy cricket, football, basketball, kabaddi, hockey, volleyball, handball and baseball. It is an online game where users create a virtual team of real-life players and earn points based on the performances of these players in real matches. A user who scores the maximum points in their joined contests attains the first rank on the leader-board. Dream11 offers free and paid contests. A user has to pay a certain fee to join a contest and can win real cash. To participate in a Dream11 game, a user must be at least 18 years old and needs to get their profile verified using their PAN.
