= GamerBee =

Taiwanese esports player (born 1978)

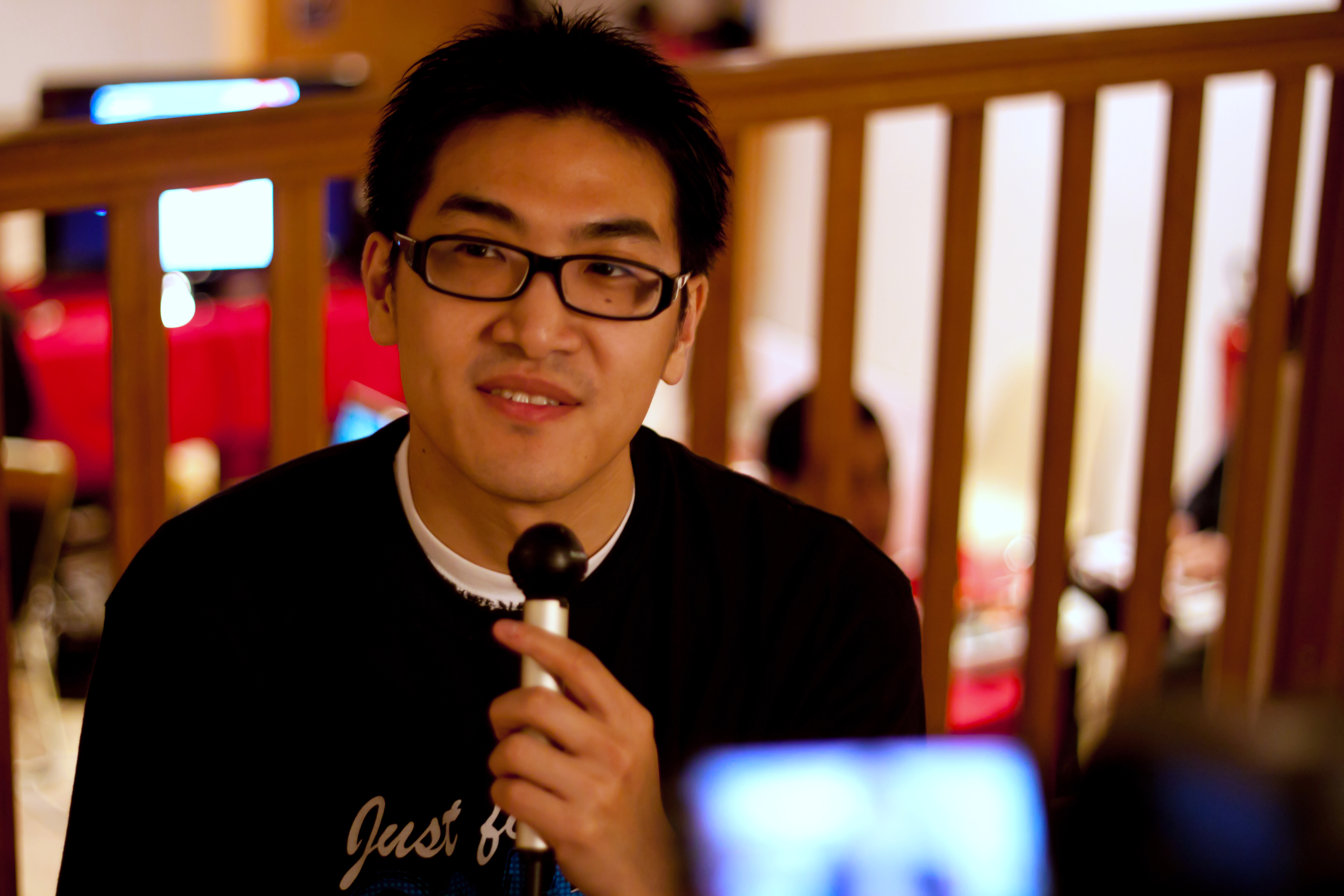
- Hsiang in 2010

Personal information
- Name: Bruce Yu-lin Hsiang
- Born: 1978 or 1979 (age 47–48)
- Nationality: Taiwanese

Career information
- Games: Street Fighter
- Sports career
Medal record
Esports
Representing Chinese Taipei
Asian Games
Silver medal – second place	2022 Hangzhou	Street Fighter V

Bruce Yu-lin Hsiang (Chinese: 向玉麟; pinyin: Xiàng Yùlín; Wade–Giles: Hsiang Yu-lin) is a Taiwanese esportist fighting games player who specializes in Street Fighter where he mains Adon and Elena in Ultra Street Fighter IV, and Necalli in Street Fighter V. GamerBee is currently sponsored by ZOWIE. GamerBee finished second at EVO 2015 after losing to Yusuke Momochi. He placed 13th at Capcom Cup 2015. GamerBee was announced as one of the first two players for Red Bull Kumite 2016's Street Fighter V tournament. He finished second at the Street Fighter V event in the 2022 Asian Games, winning a silver medal. GamerBee won two gold medals at the Global Esports Games in the Street Fighter V events at Singapore 2021 and Istanbul 2022.

== Early life ==
Born in a single-parent family, Xiang Yulin's interest in fighting games began in the fifth grade of elementary school, when he saw the "World Warriors II" video game in a grocery store near his home and started to hang out in the toy store. As a result of the fights he had in elementary school, Yulin was repeatedly bullied in junior high school, which caused him to skip class to play video games; he said that there were too many opportunities for him to go into gangs or other ways of going down the path of no return at that time, but it was the fighting games that always attracted him and kept him on the right track.

Afterwards, Xiang Yulin enrolled in the Commercial Japanese Department of Taichung's Xinmin High School, and at the age of 16, he won the national championship of VR Fighter. He originally had the chance to participate in the World Championships in Japan, but because the Ministry of Economic Affairs of the Republic of China (R.O.C.) prohibited people under the age of 18 from entering and leaving video game rooms at that time, he was reported to the police and his eligibility was revoked.

Since graduating from school, he has worked as an editor for a video game magazine and as a hotel manager, during which time he occasionally traveled abroad to participate in combat video game tournaments and occasionally streamed combat games online.

== Personal life ==
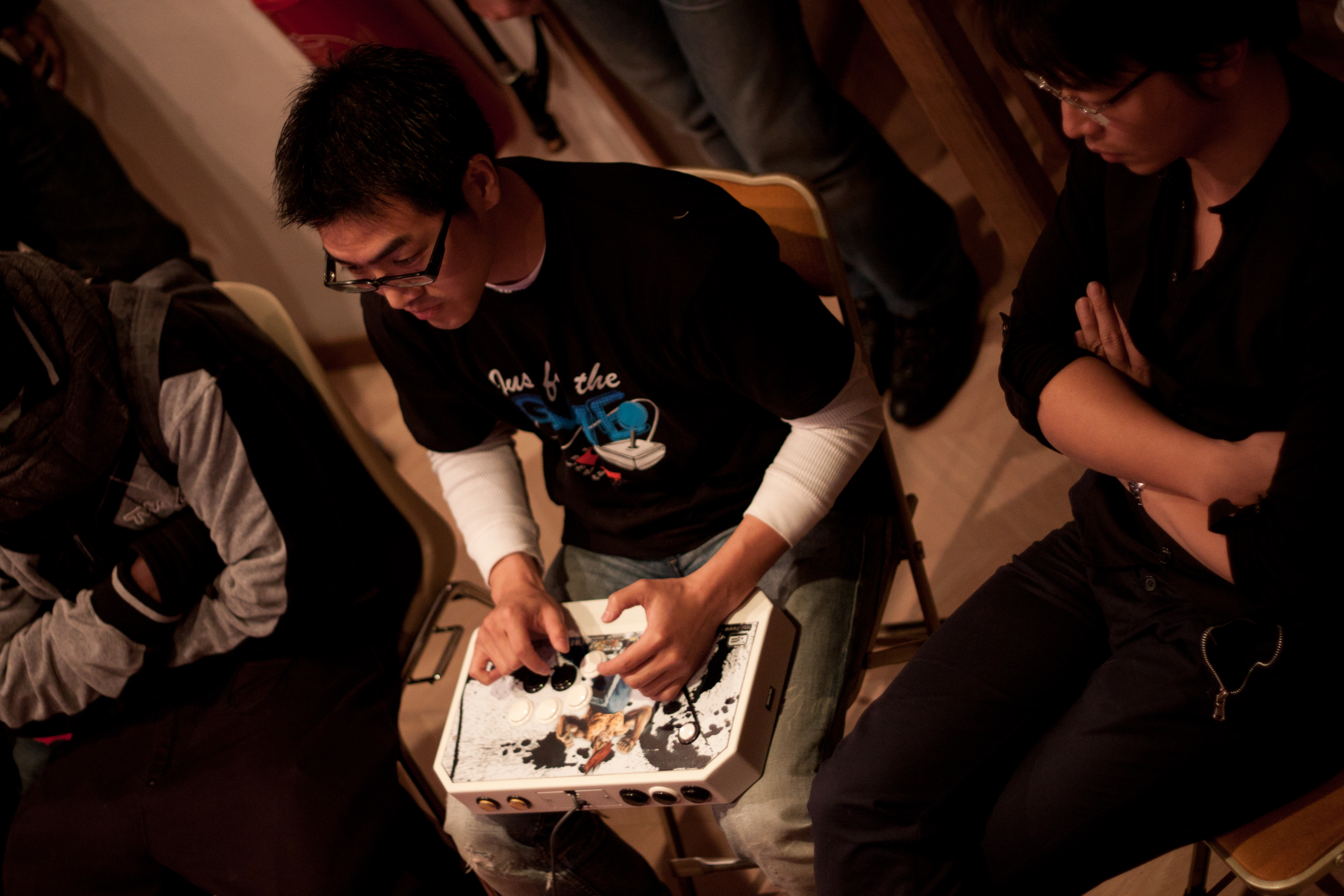
Hsiang playing Street Fighter in 2010.

Prior to becoming a professional gamer, Hsiang worked in the hospitality industry. He revealed that he made around $1 million NTD in 2014 through prize money, streaming and sponsorship. In September 2015 he became Twitch's Partnerships Development Lead in Taiwan.
