= Esports at the 2022 Asian Games – Street Fighter V =

Street Fighter V at the 2022 Asian Games
- Venue: Hangzhou Esports Center
- Date: 26–28 September 2023
- Competitors: 35 from 22 nations

Medalists
gold medal	Kim Gwan-woo	South Korea
silver medal	Hsiang Yu-lin	Chinese Taipei
bronze medal	Lin Li-wei	Chinese Taipei

The Street Fighter V event at the 2022 Asian Games took place from 26 to 28 September 2023 in Hangzhou, China.

The game's second update Champion Edition was used for the tournament.

A qualification tournament called AESF Road to Asian Games 2022 was played in Hangzhou from 22 to 23 July 2023. The results of this tournament were used to determine the seedings for the Games. Talal Rajikhan, Brandon Chia and Hsiang Yu-lin won their respective groups to become the top three seeds.

== Schedule ==
All times are China Standard Time (UTC+08:00)

Date	Time	Event
Tuesday, 26 September 2023	09:00	Qualification
Tuesday, 26 September 2023	09:50	Round of 32
Tuesday, 26 September 2023	10:40	Round 1
Tuesday, 26 September 2023	11:30	Round 2
Tuesday, 26 September 2023	14:00	Round 3
Tuesday, 26 September 2023	14:50	Round 4
Tuesday, 26 September 2023	15:40	Round 5
Tuesday, 26 September 2023	16:30	Round 6
Wednesday, 27 September 2023	14:00	Round 7
Wednesday, 27 September 2023	14:50	Winners final
Thursday, 28 September 2023	19:00	Losers final
Thursday, 28 September 2023	20:20	Final

== Results ==
=== Qualification ===
Qualification
Kenryo Hayashi (JPN)	2
Ahmad Al-Ali (JOR)	0
Adham Ketaneh (PLE)	2
Mohammed Hussain (QAT)	0
Ayman Yusuf Salman (BRN)	1
Chan Chi Hou (MAC)	2

=== Winners bracket ===
==== Top half ====
Round of 32
Talal Rajikhan (KSA)	2
Mayank Prajapati (IND)	1
Wong Yuk Cheung (HKG)	2
Abdulla Al-Mannai (QAT)	0
Umar Rabil Nuzair (MDV)	0
Huỳnh Thoại Chương (VIE)	2
Ross Jhan Villarin (PHI)	0
Sitta Chantasriviroje (THA)	2
Phettoulath Chanthavongsack (LAO)	0
Ahmed Bahlool (BRN)	2
Mohammed Al-Banna (UAE)	2
Azam Narziev (TJK)	0
Yeon Jea-gil (KOR)	0
Lin Li-wei (TPE)	2
Kenryo Hayashi (JPN)	2
Tassyner Kalel (KAZ)	0

Round 1
Talal Rajikhan (KSA)	2
Wong Yuk Cheung (HKG)	0
Huỳnh Thoại Chương (VIE)	2
Sitta Chantasriviroje (THA)	0
Ahmed Bahlool (BRN)	2
Mohammed Al-Banna (UAE)	0
Lin Li-wei (TPE)	2
Kenryo Hayashi (JPN)	0

Round 2
Talal Rajikhan (KSA)	2
Huỳnh Thoại Chương (VIE)	1
Ahmed Bahlool (BRN)	0
Lin Li-wei (TPE)	2

Round 3
Talal Rajikhan (KSA)	0
Lin Li-wei (TPE)	2

==== Bottom half ====
Round of 32
Brandon Chia (SGP)	2
Adham Ketaneh (PLE)	0
Bauyrzhan Sagimbekov (KAZ)	0
Kim Gwan-woo (KOR)	2
Jerry Cheong (MAS)	2
Thum Homchuen (THA)	1
Masaki Kawano (JPN)	2
Rashid Al-Awadhi (UAE)	0
Ayan Biswas (IND)	2
Nguyễn Khánh Hùng Châu (VIE)	0
Abdulrahman Al-Rayfal (KSA)	2
Mamarizo Mamarizoev (TJK)	0
Christian Aron Jonathan (INA)	0
Yeh Man Ho (HKG)	2
Chan Chi Hou (MAC)	0
Hsiang Yu-lin (TPE)	2

Round 1
Brandon Chia (SGP)	1
Kim Gwan-woo (KOR)	2
Jerry Cheong (MAS)	1
Masaki Kawano (JPN)	2
Ayan Biswas (IND)	1
Abdulrahman Al-Rayfal (KSA)	2
Yeh Man Ho (HKG)	1
Hsiang Yu-lin (TPE)	2

Round 2
Kim Gwan-woo (KOR)	2
Masaki Kawano (JPN)	0
Abdulrahman Al-Rayfal (KSA)	0
Hsiang Yu-lin (TPE)	2

Round 3
Kim Gwan-woo (KOR)	2
Hsiang Yu-lin (TPE)	1

=== Losers bracket ===
Round 1
Mayank Prajapati (IND)	0
Abdulla Al-Mannai (QAT)	2
Umar Rabil Nuzair (MDV)	0
Ross Jhan Villarin (PHI)	2
Phettoulath Chanthavongsack (LAO)	0
Azam Narziev (TJK)	2
Yeon Jea-gil (KOR)	2
Tassyner Kalel (KAZ)	0
Adham Ketaneh (PLE)	1
Bauyrzhan Sagimbekov (KAZ)	2
Thum Homchuen (THA)	1
Rashid Al-Awadhi (UAE)	2
Nguyễn Khánh Hùng Châu (VIE)	2
Mamarizo Mamarizoev (TJK)	0
Christian Aron Jonathan (INA)	1
Chan Chi Hou (MAC)	2

Round 2
Wong Yuk Cheung (HKG)	2
Abdulla Al-Mannai (QAT)	1
Sitta Chantasriviroje (THA)	2
Ross Jhan Villarin (PHI)	1
Mohammed Al-Banna (UAE)	2
Azam Narziev (TJK)	0
Kenryo Hayashi (JPN)	2
Yeon Jea-gil (KOR)	1
Brandon Chia (SGP)	2
Bauyrzhan Sagimbekov (KAZ)	0
Jerry Cheong (MAS)	2
Rashid Al-Awadhi (UAE)	0
Ayan Biswas (IND)	2
Nguyễn Khánh Hùng Châu (VIE)	0
Yeh Man Ho (HKG)	2
Chan Chi Hou (MAC)	0

Round 3
Wong Yuk Cheung (HKG)	2
Sitta Chantasriviroje (THA)	1
Mohammed Al-Banna (UAE)	0
Kenryo Hayashi (JPN)	2
Brandon Chia (SGP)	2
Jerry Cheong (MAS)	0
Ayan Biswas (IND)	0
Yeh Man Ho (HKG)	2

Round 4
Huỳnh Thoại Chương (VIE)	0
Wong Yuk Cheung (HKG)	2
Ahmed Bahlool (BRN)	2
Kenryo Hayashi (JPN)	1
Masaki Kawano (JPN)	2
Brandon Chia (SGP)	0
Abdulrahman Al-Rayfal (KSA)	0
Yeh Man Ho (HKG)	2

Round 5
Wong Yuk Cheung (HKG)	2
Ahmed Bahlool (BRN)	0
Masaki Kawano (JPN)	0
Yeh Man Ho (HKG)	2

Round 6
Talal Rajikhan (KSA)	0
Wong Yuk Cheung (HKG)	2
Hsiang Yu-lin (TPE)	2
Yeh Man Ho (HKG)	0

Round 7
Wong Yuk Cheung (HKG)	0
Hsiang Yu-lin (TPE)	2

=== Finals ===
Winners final
Lin Li-wei (TPE)	1
Kim Gwan-woo (KOR)	2

Losers final
Lin Li-wei (TPE)	2
Hsiang Yu-lin (TPE)	4

Final
Kim Gwan-woo (KOR)	4
Hsiang Yu-lin (TPE)	3
