= Federation of Indian Fantasy Sports =

National sports federation

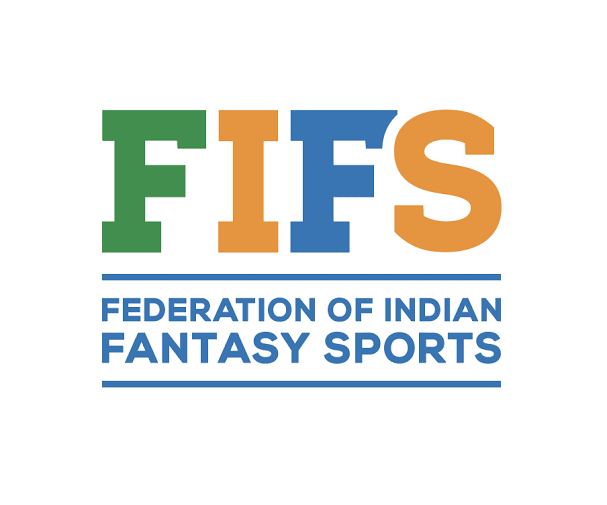
- Abbreviation: FIFS
- Formation: 2017
- Headquarters: New Delhi, Delhi, India
- Location: India
- Services: Online fantasy sports betting
- Fields: Fantasy sports
- Members: 21
- Official language: English
- President: Harsh Jain
- Website: www.fifs.in
- Formerly called: Indian Federation of Sports Gaming

The Federation of Indian Fantasy Sports or FIFS is India's only self-governing body for fantasy sports in India and is based in New Delhi. It supports the Indian fantasy sports industry and its interests.

FIFS was previously formed as the Indian Federation of Sports Gaming or IFSG, later changing their name to the Federation of Indian Fantasy Sports. The CEO of FIFS is Anwar Shirpurwala, and Harsh Jain is the president and co-founder of Dream11, a fantasy sports website.

== History ==
FIFS was founded as the Indian Federation of Sports Gaming or IFSG in 2017. They are registered under section 8 of the Indian Companies Act, 2013. It is the only regulatory and representative body of the fantasy sports industry in India. Former judge of the Supreme Court of India, Justice Arjan Kumar Sikri has been appointed as the organization's ombudsman and ethics officer.

== Controversies over legality ==
The State of Kerala received petitions wanting a ban on fantasy gaming sites and applications. The Kerala High Court studied several clauses and constitutional acts and found that rummy, several other card games, darts, ball throwing contests, and shooting contests, even those involving bets, are games of skill, rather than games of chance, and thus not covered by gambling bans. Based on this information, it was decided on 15 February 2022 that because of their similarities to fantasy sports, fantasy sports betting is also a game of skill and is thus legal, according to section 14 (A) of 1976.

On 13 April 2019, the Bombay High Court declared fantasy sports betting to be legal, recognizing it as a legitimate industry based on a game of skill.

On 29 July 2021, the Rajasthan High Court reviewed a similar case and finalized a ruling on fantasy sports betting. Similarly to the Kerala ruling, fantasy sports were recognized as a games of skill, rather than illegal betting or gambling, by the 276th Law Commission Report.

On 8 August 2021, the Supreme Court of India officially declared fantasy sports betting legal. The bench ruled that fantasy sports, with or without bets involved, counts as a game of skill involving money and does not constitute gambling or illegal betting. Despite this ruling, fantasy sports betting is still banned in the states of Sikkim, Nagaland, Odisha, Telangana, and Andhra Pradesh.

On 2 October 2021, a court in Chandigarh dismissed a case seeking to ban fantasy sports betting, stating the game doesn’t involve gambling.

== Leadership ==
- Anwar Shirpurwala, CEO
- Harsh Jain, President
- Bimal Julka, Chairman
- Joy Bhattacharjya, Director General
- Justice Arjan Kumar Sikri, Ombudsman, Ethics Officer
- John Loffhagen, Member of Advisory Council
- Amrit Mathur, Member of Advisory Council
- Ratnakar Shetty, Member of Advisory Council

== Member organizations ==
The following is a list of FIFS member fantasy sport organizations:

Platform	Organization
Dream11	Sporta Technologies Pvt Ltd.
Fantasy Akhada	Super Six Sports Gaming Pvt Ltd.
A23	Head Digital Works Pvt Ltd
Guru11	Intuitor Technofantasy Pvt Ltd.
Sportasy	Blossomfield Gamingzone Pvt Ltd.
Khelo Fantasy Live	Gig Work Pvt Ltd.
Vinfotech	
Twelfth Man	
FSL11	
Mega Games 11	
Spice Fantasy	

== See also ==
- Fantasy cricket
- Daily fantasy sports
- Fantasy sport in India
- Video gaming in India
