= Gambling in Bangladesh =

Gambling is illegal in Bangladesh. The Gambling Prevention Act, 2026 (Act No. 98 of 2026) is the principal legislation governing gambling in the country. It replaced the Public Gambling Act, 1867 and came into force on 1 July 2026.

The Act regulates both conventional and technology-enabled gambling, including online and remote gambling, online betting, sports betting, virtual casinos, digital gambling platforms, match-fixing and spot-fixing. It also addresses the use of virtual private networks (VPNs), mirror sites, digital wallets, cryptocurrency, fraudulent or ghost SIM cards and false mobile financial service accounts in connection with gambling.

Under the Act, direct or indirect involvement in ordinary gambling is punishable by up to two years' imprisonment, a fine of up to Tk.2 lakh, or both. Online or remote gambling is punishable by up to five years' imprisonment or a fine of up to Tk.1 crore, or both. Online betting and operating as a bookmaker carry penalties of up to seven years' imprisonment and a fine of up to Tk.5 crore, or both.

The Act also criminalises match-fixing, spot-fixing, gambling advertising and promotion, sponsorship, affiliate marketing and referral campaigns. Match-fixing is punishable by up to seven years' imprisonment and a fine of up to Tk.1 crore, while spot-fixing carries a maximum sentence of five years and a fine of up to Tk.50 lakh. Gambling promotion through advertising, sponsorship or related activities can result in up to three years' imprisonment or a fine of up to Tk.50 lakh, or both.

== History ==
Before 2026, gambling in Bangladesh was primarily governed by the Public Gambling Act, 1867. The Act prohibited public gambling and gambling houses but was enacted before the development of the internet and therefore did not specifically address many forms of online gambling.

The absence of legislation specifically designed for internet-based gambling contributed to uncertainty over the legal treatment of online gambling. Gambling activities subsequently expanded through websites, mobile applications, social media and digital payment systems.

In June 2024, approximately 5 million people were reported to be active on various gambling websites in Bangladesh, according to research by Dismislab.

Before the introduction of dedicated legislation covering online gambling, authorities used various provisions relating to gambling, cybercrime, fraud and money laundering to prosecute gambling-related activities.

In 2025, the Criminal Investigation Department began a nationwide crackdown on online gambling and betting. Despite enforcement efforts, gambling advertisements continued to target Bangladeshi users through online advertising networks. Police also arrested people suspected of gambling offences and seized cash in connection with gambling operations.

=== Gambling Prevention Act, 2026 ===
On 30 June 2026, Jatiya Sangsad passed the Gambling Prevention Bill, 2026. The legislation repealed the Public Gambling Act, 1867 and established a new framework for addressing both traditional gambling and gambling conducted through digital technologies.

The bill became the Gambling Prevention Act, 2026, Act No. 98 of 2026, and was published in the Bangladesh Gazette on 1 July 2026.

The Act introduced specific legal definitions covering online gambling, remote gambling, betting, bookmakers, sports betting, digital gambling platforms, digital wallets, cryptocurrency, VPNs, mirror sites, fraudulent and ghost SIM cards, false mobile financial service accounts, match-fixing and spot-fixing.

Organised gambling and gambling-related money laundering involving fraudulent SIM cards, mobile financial service accounts or cryptocurrency can carry a maximum sentence of 10 years' imprisonment and a fine of up to Tk.5 crore. The Act also provides for the confiscation of property and digital infrastructure associated with gambling offences.

The Act prohibits gambling advertising, promotion, sponsorship, affiliate marketing and referral campaigns. It also covers gambling-related activities conducted through digital platforms and social media.

The government has been given powers to use technological measures, including artificial intelligence and digital monitoring tools, to detect online gambling activities.

== Types of gambling ==
=== Lottery ===
Unlike other forms of gambling and betting, recognised entities can operate lotteries in Bangladesh under government policy.

=== Online gambling ===
Online gambling was historically subject to legal uncertainty because the Public Gambling Act, 1867 was enacted long before the development of the internet. Online gambling subsequently expanded through websites, mobile applications, social media and digital payment systems, creating difficulties for law enforcement.

Mobile banking agents in Meherpur have been reported as conduits for online gambling operations.

The Gambling Prevention Act, 2026 now expressly regulates online and remote gambling. It covers online betting platforms, virtual casinos, digital gambling platforms, VPN-enabled gambling, mirror sites and other digital infrastructure used to conduct or facilitate gambling.

Online or remote gambling can result in up to five years' imprisonment or a fine of up to Tk.1 crore, or both. Online betting and bookmaker activities can result in up to seven years' imprisonment and a fine of up to Tk.5 crore, or both.

The Act also addresses the financial infrastructure used by gambling networks. Gambling-related financial transactions involving banks, mobile financial services, digital wallets and cryptocurrency may attract additional liability under applicable money-laundering legislation.

=== Sports betting ===
Online sports betting in Bangladesh increased dramatically after the 2012 Bangladesh Premier League tournament. Matches involving the BPL, IPL, La Liga, and Premier League have attracted betting activity.

Reports have linked online sports betting to increased gambling among young people in rural areas, with gambling websites promoted through platforms such as Facebook and YouTube. Some reports have also described gamblers selling land and other assets to sustain gambling and suffering severe financial losses. In 2020, authorities in Feni attempted to curb IPL betting by blocking cable television during matches.

Shakib Al Hasan, a sports personality, drew controversy for promoting a sports betting website. He subsequently withdrew from his contract after pressure from the Bangladesh Cricket Board and an impending investigation by the Criminal Investigation Department.

Shakib's sister, Jannatul Hasan Ritu, was also subject to investigation in connection with the Mahadev Betting App Case, in which she was named as an investor.

Domestic football has also been associated with betting scandals. In September 2019, a Bangladesh Police raid on clubhouses in Motijheel, Dhaka, revealed illegal casino and gambling equipment.

In 2021, Bangladesh Premier Football League club Arambagh KS were relegated to the third tier because of involvement in spot-fixing, match manipulation, live and online betting, and other irregularities.

Match-fixing has continued to be reported in Bangladesh's lower football leagues, with gambling syndicates alleged to have influenced club officials through financial incentives. The Bangladesh Football Federation has faced criticism over its response to such allegations.
