= Rov =

Talmud concept

Rov (Hebrew: רוֹב) is a Talmudic concept which means the majority.

It is based on the passage in Exodus 23;2: "after the majority to wrest" (אחרי רבים להטות), which in Rabbinic interpretation means, that you shall accept things as the majority.

The most original practice of that term is by a Sanhedrin meeting, where the opinion of the majority is the final law.

The term applies also to accidental mixtures of Kosher and non-Kosher ingredients, when the non-kosher can be nullified be the majority of the kosher (some restrictions apply to this halacha).
