= Asian Electronic Sports Federation =

Esports governing body in Asia

- Abbreviation: AESF
- Formation: 2018; 8 years ago
- Type: Sport organisation
- Headquarters: Hong Kong
- Members: 45
- Official language: English
- President: Santi Lothong
- Vice-president: See list: Doniyorkhon Djuraev · Youngman Kim · Lokesh Suji · Do Viet Hung · Saeed Sharaf
- Affiliations: Olympic Council of Asia
- Website: www.aesf.com

The Asian Electronic Sports Federation (AESF) is the governing body of Esports in Asia and recognized by Olympic Council of Asia.

== Members ==
So far, there are 45 member nations in AESF:

Nation	Organization
Afghanistan	
Bahrain	
Bangladesh	Bangladesh Youth Development & Electronic Sports Association
Bhutan	
Brunei	
Cambodia	E-Sports Federation Cambodia
China	CSIC, e-Sports Department
Hong Kong	E-Sports Association Hong Kong
India	Electronic Sports Federation of India
Indonesia	Indonesia Esports Association
Iran	Iran Electronic Sports Association
Iraq	
Japan	Japan eSports Union
Jordan	Jordan Esports Committee
Kazakhstan	Qazaq Cybersport Federation
North Korea	
South Korea	Korea e-Sports Association
Kuwait	
Kyrgyzstan	Esports Federation of Kyrgyzstan
Laos	Lao e-Sports Federation
Lebanon	
Macau	Macau E-Sports Federation
Malaysia	Esports Malaysia
Maldives	Maldives E-Sporting Association
Mongolia	Mongolian E-Sport Association
Myanmar	Myanmar Electronics Sports Federation ( MESF )
Nepal	Nepal Esports Association
Oman	Committee For Games And E-Sports
Pakistan	Pakistan Electronic Sports Federation
Palestine	
Philippines	Philippine Esports Organization
Qatar	
Saudi Arabia	Saudi Esports Federation
Singapore	Singapore Esports Association
Sri Lanka	Sri Lanka eSports Association
Syria	Syrian Esports Association
Thailand	Thailand E-Sports Federation
Timor-Leste	
Turkmenistan	Turkmenistan National e-Sports Federation
Chinese Taipei	Chinese Taipei Esports Association
United Arab Emirates	
Uzbekistan	Uzbekistan Virtual Sports and Cyber Football Federation
Vietnam	Vietnam Recreational eSports Association
Yemen	

== Competitions ==
Years	Location	Dates	Event name	Games	Category	Champion	Players
2020	Online	4 June - 10 July 2020	2020 Your Home Your Arena	Mobile Legends: Bang Bang		Indonesia	Fiqri - XcN Barbie, Zaky - XcN Bucank, Erwin - XcN Fenryr, Ibnu - SRN Altamiz, Rovi - SRN JeyY
2020	Online	4 June - 10 July 2020	2020 Your Home Your Arena	The King of Fighters XIV		Japan	Akihito Sawada - SCORE
2024	Online	17–18 August 2024	Your Home Your Arena Charity Cup 2024	eFootball 2024 (Mobile)		Kazakhstan	NURBAKYT MIRGALI - justNurba_kz
2024	Nanning, China	26 September 2024	2024 China-ASEAN E-sport Competition	Honor of Kings		Guangxi Zhuang Autonomous Region	
2024	Nanning, China	27–28 September 2024	2024 China-ASEAN E-sport Competition	Mobile Legends: Bang Bang		Cambodia	
2024	Indoor Stadium Hua Mak, Bangkok	25–27 November 2024	Asian Esports Games 2024	Mobile Legends: Bang Bang	Female	Indonesia	Vivi - Vivian, Venny - Fumi, Cindy - Cinny, Michelle - Chell, Viorelle - Vival
2024	Indoor Stadium Hua Mak, Bangkok	28–29 November 2024	Asian Esports Games 2024	Arena of Valor		Thailand	THAI SƠN - ADONIS, VĂN HOÀNG - HOANGTD, HỮU PHƯỚC - ANNE, QUANG HẢI - QUANGHAI, DUNH QUANG - EMPER, MINH AN - TAMA
2024	Indoor Stadium Hua Mak, Bangkok		Asian Esports Games 2024	eFootball 2024 (Mobile)		Thailand	Nattawat - TXRO
