= Promotion and Regulation of Online Gaming Act, 2025 =

Indian legislation regulating online gaming

Parliament of India
- Long title: An Act to provide for the promotion of online gaming as an industry, to regulate online gaming platforms, protect users from harm, ensure responsible gaming, prevent illegal betting and gambling, and to provide for matters connected therewith or incidental thereto.
- Citation: Act No. 32 of 2025
- Territorial extent: India
- Passed by: Lok Sabha
- Passed: 20 August 2025
- Passed by: Rajya Sabha
- Passed: 21 August 2025
- Assented to by: President of India
- Assented to: 22 August 2025
- Commenced: TBA

Legislative history

Initiating chamber: Lok Sabha
- Bill title: Promotion and Regulation of Online Gaming Bill, 2025
- Bill citation: Bill No. 110 of 2025
- Introduced by: Ashwini Vaishnav
- Introduced: 20 August 2025
- First reading: 20 August 2025
- Second reading: 20 August 2025
- Third reading: 21 August 2025

Revising chamber: Rajya Sabha
- Passed: 21 August 2025

Summary
- Creates a regulatory framework for online games in India, including online games, e-sports and online gambling. It prohibits online money games and defines punishment for offering & advertising them. It also recognises e-sports as competitive sport and aims to promote and develop them.

Keywords
- Online gambling, Sports betting, Online game, Esports
- Status: In force

The Promotion and Regulation of Online Gaming Act, 2025 is an Act of the Parliament of India which provides a comprehensive legal framework for the licensing, classification, and regulation of online gaming in India. The Act seeks to promote online gaming as an emerging industry while ensuring consumer protection, responsible gaming practices, and safeguards against illegal betting and gambling.

== Timeline ==
- 19 August 2025: Cabinet approved the bill to be introduced.
- 20 August 2025: the Promotion and Regulation of Online Gaming Bill, 2025 was introduced and passed in Lok Sabha, the lower house of the Parliament of India.
- 21 August 2025, the Promotion and Regulation of Online Gaming Bill, 2025 was introduced and passed in Rajya Sabha, the upper house of the Parliament of India.
- 22 August 2025: the Promotion and Regulation of Online Gaming Bill, 2025 received assent by the President of India making it the Promotion and Regulation of Online Gaming Act, 2025.

== Background ==
India's online gaming industry has expanded rapidly in recent years, accompanied by rising concerns over addiction, underage participation, financial fraud, and the blurred distinction between skill-based and chance-based games. Regulation of gaming was earlier left to states, creating fragmented frameworks. The Act was introduced to provide a uniform national regime, harmonised with international best practices, while also promoting investment and innovation in esports, technology, and digital entertainment.

== Provisions ==
=== Regulatory Authority ===
- The Act establishes a National Online Gaming Commission (NOGC) to regulate and license online gaming platforms.
- The NOGC is composed of a Chairperson and members with expertise in law, information technology, consumer protection, economics, and public administration.
- State governments may create state-level regulatory authorities under the overall supervision of the NOGC.

=== Licensing of Platforms ===
- All online gaming platforms must obtain a licence from the NOGC to operate in India.
- Only licensed platforms can advertise, collect user deposits, or conduct prize-based competitions.
- Licences may be suspended or cancelled for violations of the Act or conditions of licence.

=== Classification of Games ===
- Games are classified as:
  - Permissible online games of skill, such as esports and fantasy sports.
  - Prohibited online games of chance, including those involving betting or wagering with money.
- Hybrid games containing elements of both skill and chance are to be classified by the NOGC.

=== Consumer Protection and Responsible Gaming ===
- Platforms must verify the identity and age of users, disallowing access to minors.
- Mandatory features include self-exclusion, time limits, and deposit limits.
- Advertisements must not target children and must include responsible gaming warnings.
- Licensed platforms must provide grievance redressal mechanisms and ensure data protection.

=== Financial Oversight ===
- Licensed platforms must hold user funds in segregated accounts and ensure refundability.
- Compliance with Prevention of Money Laundering Act, 2002 and Foreign Exchange Management Act, 1999 is mandatory.
- Strong anti-money laundering and anti-fraud systems are required.

=== Dispute Resolution ===
- The Act establishes an Online Gaming Appellate Tribunal to adjudicate disputes between users, licensees, and regulators.
- The tribunal has powers of a civil court.
- Appeals from the tribunal lie directly before the Supreme Court of India.

=== Penalties ===
- Unlicensed operation of online gaming platforms is punishable with fines and imprisonment.
- Violations such as misleading advertising, manipulation of outcomes, or breach of consumer safeguards attract graded penalties.

=== Promotion of Industry ===
- The Act recognises online gaming as a sector eligible for government incentives and investment promotion.
- It encourages development of esports infrastructure, research on mental health impacts, and skill development programmes in gaming-related fields.

== Promotion and Regulation of Online Gaming Rules, 2025 ==
On October 12, 2025, MeitY released the Draft Promotion and Regulation of Online Gaming Rules, 2025, in terms of section 19 of the Promotion and Regulation of Online Gaming Act, 2025.

On 22 April 2026, the government of India has notified the rules.

== Challenge before Court ==
The provisions of the Act have been challenged before Karnataka, Madhya Pradesh and Delhi high courts by the affected parties. Subsequently, on September 8, the central government's petition, Supreme Court of India transferred all the pending and future challenge cases to the Supreme Court.

== See also ==
- Information Technology Act, 2000
- Esports in India
- Ministry of Electronics and Information Technology
