= Desi Adda: Games of India =

2009 video game

- PS2 packaging artwork
- Developer: Gameshastra
- Publisher: Sony Computer Entertainment Europe
- Platforms: PlayStation 2, PlayStation Portable
- Release: PlayStation 2: IND: October 27, 2009; PlayStation Portable: WW: February 15, 2010

Desi Adda: Games of India is a collection of video games developed by Gameshastra and published by Sony Computer Entertainment Europe. It was released for PlayStation 2 on October 27, 2009. It was later released for PlayStation Portable and was the first Indian developed game to be added to PlayStation Network. The game is in four languages: English, Hindi, Tamil and Punjabi.

== Gameplay ==
Desi Adda consists of a collection of cultural games from India, based on traditional Indian sports. These include kite fighting, kabaddi, pachisi, bagh-chal and gilli-danda. The player is placed in an Indian village, where they can play different games with other villagers and converse with them. The player will learn from the villagers- a couple in love and must interact with different villagers in order to progress the story. An additional beat-matching dance game is unlocked by completing the story.

== Plot ==
The player takes the role of Avinash, the son of an NRI businessman. Avinash has lived abroad but returns on a trip to his ancestral village. During his visit, he meets Gowri and Gopal, a couple who are in love. The village head, Garjan Singh, opposes their match. Through his interactions with villagers, Avinash helps the couple gain approval for their wedding.

== Development ==
The game was developed by Gameshastra, an Indian-based developer. Sony Computer Entertainment Europe published the game, with the goal of helping keep the PlayStation 2 market in India alive. It is the first game developed entirely in India to be released on the PlayStation Network and included three languages. Desi Adda was designed for both home consoles and handheld devices, and oriented towards casual gaming. It was targeted towards a first-time gamer audience between the ages of 8 and 15.

== Reception ==
Bollywood Hungama was critical of the bonus beat matching game, calling it a "showstopper" as the controls were not very responsive. They were more receptive towards the Gilli Danda game, saying that the unpredictability made it fun. Ultimately however, they did not feel the game was worth the price. ET Now noted that the game was very simple in terms of gameplay and graphics and was not really appealing to gamers over the age of ten.
