= Video games in India =

Online gaming market of India by revenue per platform in FY 2017.
1. Mobile (85.0%)
2. PC / Laptop (11.0%)
3. Tablets (4.00%)

Video gaming in India is an emerging market since India is experiencing strong growth in online gaming, making it one of the top gaming markets in the world. Over the past few decades, the Indian gaming industry has gone from close to nonexistent in the 1990s to one of the top markets globally in the late 2010s. In 2019, the online gaming market in India was estimated at ₹6,200 crore (US$660 million) with an estimated 300 million gamers, a 41.6% increase from 2018. As of 2021, it is one of the top five mobile gaming markets in the world. By the third quarter of 2020 there were more than 7.4 billion mobile game downloads. According to the "State of India Gaming Report," released by venture capital firm Lumikai with Google, as of November 2023, there were 568 million gamers in India. Additionally, it was reported that in FY23, 41% of gamers were female and 66% were from non-metros, with each user on average spending 10–12 hours per week on video games. Video game piracy is also prevalent across the country, making up the majority of installed games.

Video game development in India is still underdeveloped compared to other Asian countries, such as Japan, China and South Korea. However, the growing amount of gamers in India has attracted interest from global video game companies. As investments from international video game companies continue to rise, more global game studios such as Ubisoft and Microsoft Games have opened offices in India. Local Indian game studios are also steadily growing. India went from 15 game development studios to 275 from 2009 to 2021. The growing presence of video games in India has led to bans and regulations on gaming imposed by the Indian government.

== History ==
=== Growth of gaming devices ===
In India, video games used to only be available at video game parlours, where games came in the form of coin-operated machines. In the 1990s, 8-bit NES clones that ran on cartridges were introduced to India. Each cartridge contained many classic games like Super Mario Bros or Contra. These game consoles allowed people to play games inside their homes, which sparked the initial growth of the popularity of video games in India.

In the mid-to-late-90s, sales in personal computers skyrocketed and replaced the 8-bit consoles. Players were also now able to install games on PCs rather than purchase cartridges. The PC remains one of the most popular devices for games today, with 87% of surveyed gamers preferring it over mobile gaming. The PlayStation also remains fairly popular, though not as much as the PC since console games tend to cost more.

In the 2000s, mobile devices became more common in India. This caused a huge growth in gaming because most smartphones had access to mobile games. In 2020, there were 696 million smartphone users, compared to 2013 where there were 76 million users. India expects to reach 970 million users by 2025.

=== Growth of the gaming industry ===
Cyber cafés, which are cafés offering public Internet access, contributed to the growth of India's video game market. In 2006, there were over 100,000 cyber cafés, 40% of which were used to play online games. In 2008, there were 180,000 cyber cafés, but by 2017, the number declined to 50,000. One of primary reasons for decline was the IT Act, which caused licensing issues and other restrictions.

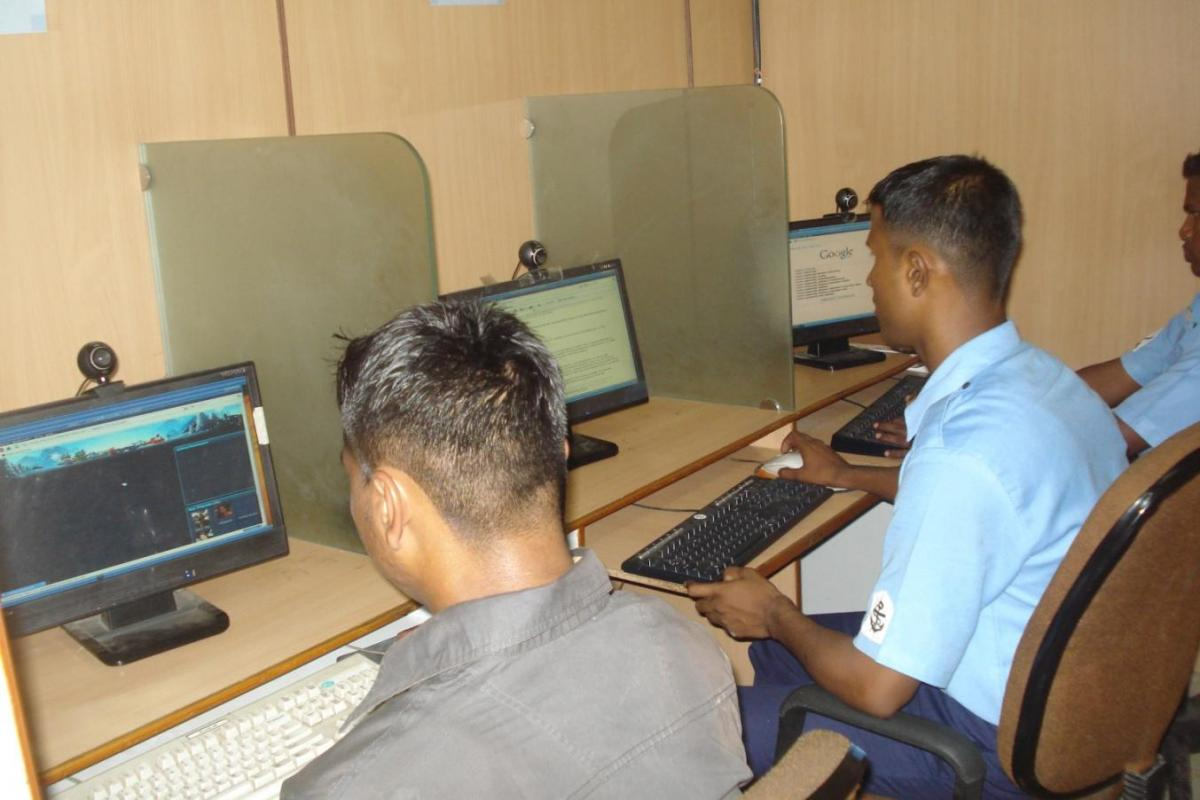
Indian cyber cafés provide access to computers and gaming.

Video game studios have been sprouting in India, most notably in Bangalore, which is often called the "Silicon Valley of India." In 2009, there were only 15 game development studios in India. As of 2021, there are 15,000 game developers and 275 game developing companies in India. Technology and gaming companies began investing in India's gaming industry after seeing its potential. Large game conventions began to be hosted in India when its industry was projected to earn ₹4,200 crore (US$450 million) in 2014. Indian colleges also began offering game design and development courses to students, which led to younger generations joining the industry and an increase in game developers.

Maharashtra has announced plans to expand its gaming infrastructure. Chief Minister Devendra Fednavis outlined a proposed 50 acre complex near Navi Mumbai International Airport that would include esports arenas, content creation studios and digital facilities. He also announced the development of 12 centres focused on animation, visual effects, gaming and comics (AVGC) across the state.

== Rating system ==
In India, the most widely used video game content rating system PEGI (Pan European Gaming Information), does not have a legal basis that supports it officially but it was semi-officially introduced to the country in 2008–2009 and is used in both foreign and Indian published video games all around the country, and in almost all cases, though India is not officially represented in the PEGI council. Other labels can be seen as well such as the German USK specially on second-hand items.

== Local industry ==
=== Video games produced in India ===
The first PlayStation 2 video game completely created in India, Hanuman: Boy Warrior, was based on Hindu mythology and followed the story of the Hindu God Hanuman. This game was developed by Aurona Technologies Limited, a gaming studio located in Hyderabad. The release of the game was controversial because it was criticized for disrespecting the Hindu religion. Hindu leader, Rajan Zed, was vocal in the criticism of the game.

Hanuman was later followed by Don 2: The Game, a tie-in to the film of the same name. Besides being released for the PlayStation 2 (also serving as the final PAL region release for the console overall), Don 2 was also released for the PlayStation Portable.

Nowadays, many studios in India derive most of their income from outsourcing to foreign companies. Though most of the studios work on mobile games, there are a few working on projects on PC and consoles, such as Bangalore-based Tentworks Interactive. Tentworks Interactive recently revealed India's first major PC game title, City Block Builder, that is set for release in 2021 at the EGX gaming expo. City Block Builder won Best of EGX (2019) in London by Cultured Vultures Magazine, marking the first time that an Indian title has won such an award at a foreign expo. In 2013, NipsApp Game Studios released Hanuman Fortune, a mobile game inspired by Indian mythology.

On May 7, 2024, MadMantra released Kamla, a survival horror game set in the 1980s in India. In the game, you play as a priest tasked with exorcising a woman named Kamla who has been possessed by a demon. The gameplay involves solving puzzles, finding items for a ritual, and evading Kamla when she’s angry.

=== Integration of Indian history and culture ===
The indie game scene in India has been growing recently as more studios develop games that draw on Indian history and culture. Asura, a PC game created in 2017 by Ogre Head Studio, draws on aspects of Indian mythology. The game is not only popular in India, but also in the U.S., China, and Japan. Asura won the Game of the Year award at the 2017 NASSCOM Game Development Conference.

Holy Cow Productions and Nodding Heads Games, two Indian-based game studios, are also working to create games drawing on Indian history and culture. In July 2020, prime minister Narendra Modi called for more video games based on Indian culture as they had "huge potential" to promote national pride. A month later, Nodding Heads Games released Raji: An Ancient Epic, an adventure game inspired by Indian folklore, on the Nintendo Switch and received positive reviews globally.

==== Digitalisation of Indian sports and traditional games ====
Several traditional board games and card games have been digitalised. In 2009, Desi Adda: Games of India was released, showcasing the traditional games of India. In the same year, an American study found that digitalising local games led to better results in educating rural Indians than giving them Western video games.

In 2025, Kho Kho Federation of India President Sudhanshu Mittal mentioned that as part of a larger digitalisation drive, they had created their own e-sports version of kho kho.

=== Political and social commentary ===
Studio Oleomingus, a gaming studio based in Chala, Gujarat, creates video games that comment on India's history and politics. The games make use of surreal and fantastical visuals and environments to evoke Indian children's literature.

Missing-Game for a Cause is a role-playing video game produced in India by Leena Kejriwal and Satyajit Chakraborty. The game's storyline allows players to experience life of a victim of human trafficking. The game was created to raise awareness about human trafficking in India, where there are 98 million victims of human trafficking. The game won NASSCOM's Indie Game of the Year Award in 2016 and has over 500,000 downloads.

== Mobile gaming ==
Mobile gaming in India has grown exponentially because of inexpensive smartphones, high-speed 4G internet connection, and convenient access. As of 2019, India is one of the top five mobile gaming markets in the world in terms of number of users. In 2019, online gaming in India was estimated at ₹6,200 crore (US$660 million) with an estimated 300 million gamers. The Indian gaming market is expected to grow from ₹8,900 crore (US$950 million) in 2021 to ₹22,300 crore (US$2.4 billion) by 2023.

PlayerUnknown's Battlegrounds Mobile (PUBG Mobile), a battle royale game published by Tencent Games, became the most popular mobile game in India in 2018. As of January 2020, India became PUBG Mobile's largest market in the world with 175 million downloads, which is 24% of all PUBG Mobile players worldwide.

During the COVID-19 pandemic, there was an increase in the number of Indian mobile gamers because of the stay-at-home orders. From April 2019 and June 2020 when COVID occurred, the Google Play Store saw a 51% increase in mobile game downloads and the iOS App Store saw a 20% increase. Within the first 9 months of lockdown in 2020, India became the largest consumer of online games with 7.3 billion downloads.

According to Ernst & Young report 2024 on India estimated an Media and Entertainment industry- India is poised to become the world’s largest gaming hub. The gaming industry overtook filmed entertainment to become the fourth largest segment in Indian Media and Entertainment ecosystem. Among 450 million online gamers, 100 million play games daily. Estimated 90 million gamers paid to play games. 83% of the segment revenue has been procured from real money games. The December 2023 issue of this report also asserted that between FY20 and FY23, India’s online gaming segment witnessed a notable CAGR of 28% culminating in a market size of INR 16428 crores in FY23. Reportedly, this segment has attracted INR 22931 crores between FY20 to FY24YTD from both domestic and international sources. In addition to that, Indian gaming industry presently employs around 100000 individuals and is expected to generate more than 250000 jobs by 2025. Several Indian studios contribute to the growth of the domestic gaming industry. Notable examples include Nazara Technologies, Rockstar India, and NipsApp Game Studios, a Kerala-based company that has developed both mobile games and virtual reality training solutions.

== Esports ==
The Indian esports industry has seen significant growth in prize money, participation, and recognition over the past decade.

In 2016, the total prize money in Indian eSports in 2016 was ₹77 lakhs. This grew to ₹2.06 crores in 2017 with Dota 2 and CS:GO tournaments contributing to 87% of the total amount. The India esports market's specific 2025 valuation varies by source, with reports in early-to-mid 2025 valuing it at USD 200.7 million in 2024

By 2018, The total announced prize money in Indian eSports grew to ₹5.63 crores of which ₹3.84 crores is attributable to tournaments that actually took place during the year. The share of Dota 2 and CS:GO tournaments dropped to 61% as PUBG Mobile tournaments accounted for 18% of the total prize money during the year.

At Asian Games 2018, Tirth "gcttirth" Mehta from Bhuj, Gujarat won India's first esports medal for Hearthstone, one of the six game titles selected for the competition. He bagged the bronze medal at this demonstration event. Karan “Jin Kazama” Manganani from Jaipur was placed 4th for Clash Royale at the same tournament. These two, along with Moinuddin Amdani and Abhinav Tejan, have been recognized by the ESFI as the top 4 esports athletes and will represent the country at "global competitions".

In 2019, the total prize money in Indian eSports grew by 180%. International eSports events such as ESL One Mumbai and DreamHack: Delhi 2019 were hosted in the country.

In October 2019, international eSports team organization Fnatic announced its expansion into India by acquiring the Indian PUBG Mobile team XSpark. In January 2020, Fnatic's Indian PUBG Mobile team moved into a temporary bootcamp in Mumbai.

COBX Gaming, an esports venture backed by Route Mobile founder Rajdip Gupta, announced a $10 million investment to promote the esports ecosystem in India. COBX will launch an online domestic league, and an international league besides building an Indian team for international eSports championships.

In February 2021, the hashtag #RecognizeEsportsInIndia trended on Twitter, which caught the attention of the Indian government. A few weeks later, the Indian Olympic Association (IOA) announced esports as an official sport and the Esports Federation of India (ESFI) as its governing body. Before this announcement, esports were considered a demonstration sport in India.

In 2021, after Krafton, a South Korean gaming company, launched Battlegrounds Mobile India (BGMI) in India, they hosted BGMI Launch Party, the first BGMI esports tournament to celebrate the game's official release.

In February 2022, INOX Leisure partnered with Esports Federation of India (ESFI) to exclusively host and promote ESFI tournaments in its cinemas across the country.

India's esports revenue grew by 29% from ₹750 crore in 2020 to ₹970 crore in 2021. The number of players doubled to 600,000 in 2021, while the viewership grew to 2 million hours in the same year. The number of players is projected to reach 1 million in 2022, of which 20 percent would be female.

In 2025, Esports became a demonstration sport for the first time at a Khelo India event in the 2025 Khelo India Youth Games.

Since the launch of Valorant's India server in 2020 and the release of Counter-Strike 2 in 2023, a new PC gaming esports scene has emerged in India. The release of Counter-Strike 2 in September 2023 revitalized interest in the long-running franchise, which had maintained a strong following in the country through Counter-Strike: Global Offensive (CS:GO). India accounted for 1.64% of the global CS:GO player base as of 2021. Following the launch of CS2, industry stakeholders, including the Esports Federation of India, described it as a turning point for the domestic esports scene, forecasting increased international participation, content creation, and sponsorship opportunities.

Valorant has also played a significant role in the resurgence of Indian PC esports. Riot Games introduced the Valorant Challengers South Asia circuit as a qualifying pathway for Indian teams to reach international tournaments such as VCT Ascension Pacific. In 2025, Indian team Global Esports became the first from the country to qualify for VCT, Riot has invested in building esports infrastructure in India through LAN events, structured scrimmages and support initiatives focusing on coaching and mental wellness Initiatives aimed at increasing inclusivity include the Game Changers tournament circuit and collaborations with female-led content creator communities, which supported the formation of India’s first all-women Valorant roster. Riot’s offline engagement in India has included community LAN events, influencer meetups, and civic-focused campaigns such as a Harbor-themed beach cleanup event in Mumbai.

== Government regulations ==
=== Bans on Chinese games ===
In March 2019, PUBG Mobile was banned in the Indian state of Gujarat after the local government decided the game was "too addicting and violent" and a distraction during exam season. A number of students were caught playing the game and arrested. After the exam season ended, the ban was lifted in some cities.

Amidst the ongoing 2020 China–India skirmishes, on June 29, 2020, Mobile Legends: Bang Bang was officially banned in India along with other 58 Chinese apps like TikTok, UC Browser, and Xender due to privacy concerns. Mobile Legends: Bang Bang was one of top grossing mobile games in India. On September 2, 2020, the Indian government banned PUBG Mobile, PUBG Mobile Lite, and over 100 other Chinese apps. They believed the apps were "stealing and surreptitiously transmitting user data in an unauthorized manner to servers which have locations outside India." India prohibited the use of PUBG Mobile under the Information Technology (IT) Act Section 69A. India is one of several countries to have banned PUBG mobile in 2020, including China, Pakistan, Afghanistan, Korea, Jordan, Nepal, Israel, and Iraq.

In response to the 2020 ban on PUBG mobile, Krafton, a South Korean video game company, created Battlegrounds Mobile India. This game differs slightly from the original PUBG mobile game due to cosmetic changes, but eliminates governmental concerns about the previous app being created in China. Battlegrounds Mobile India does not allow players under the age of 18 to play more than three hours a day without parental consent. Minors are also not allowed to spend over 7000 INR a day on the game’s store.

=== Bans on online wagering games ===
The governments in several Indian states have imposed bans on online gaming which involve wagering money. In Andhra Pradesh in 2020, online gaming regulations were created in response to concerns about gamers resorting to suicide because of financial debts from gaming. In 2021, the Tamil Nadu government announced a ban (which was subsequently deemed unconstitutional by the Madras High Court) on online versions of games of skill like Chess, Trivia, Fantasy, Rummy and Poker. In Karnataka, a hub of the Indian tech industry, a ban on online betting games was also proposed in 2021. Karnataka's ban has been extended to online games that require users to pay an entry fee. Due to Karnataka’s importance in the Indian technology and gaming field, this ban has raised concerns about how it affects on the Indian gaming industry and triggered protests against it. On August 21, 2025, Indian government banned all fantasy sports games and other real money-based online games as they were considered online gambling.

== Piracy ==
India is leading in having pirated video games in the world. While there are a section of hardcore gamers, there are still many gamers playing cartridge games on the TV and handheld game consoles. The continued use of game cartridges led to the proliferation of pirated, second hand and knock-offs ones to meet the needs of a diverse range of consumers with different access to money and information. Pirated games were also an effect of mainstream video game publishers that did not recognize India as a serious market. The average consumer primarily played pirated games because of its low cost and the lack of access to original games.

With a piracy rate of software and consoles of over 80% and a penetration rate of PC still low, India's video game market has long lagged behind the rest of world, publishers and distributors of video games are struggling to find their place.

This delay is also explained by the fact that the country has traditionally never had a real culture of gaming. However, this situation is changing for since past few years due to the increase in the average income of Indians and the increasing interest in internet and entertainment.

== See also ==
- Fantasy sport in India - Overview of Fantasy sport in India
- India Game Developer Conference

== Bibliography ==
- Bendik Stang, Morten A. Osterholt et Erik Hoftun, The Book of Games, Volume 2 : The Ultimate Reference on PC & Video Games, Book of Games, 2007, p. 397 (ISBN 9788299737821)
- Maitrayee Deka, (2016). Bazaars and Video Games in India. BioScope: South Asian Screen Studies. 7 (2)
