= Chief ethics officer =

Responsible for shaping an Organization's ethical culture drafting the code of conduct

The chief ethics officer (EO) is a senior ranking individual in an organization. The primary role is to build a strong ethical culture within the organization. In order to perform these responsibilities the chief ethics officer must be given support, independence, and opportunity to influence key decision-making board members. The chief ethics officer normally reports to the chief executive officer, and have some access to the board of directors.

== The role ==
The chief ethics officer role was redefined in 1991 for businesses, when Congress passed the Federal Guidelines for Organization (FSCO). Before 1991 this role existed in the financial services and the health care industry without much influence. Because of the rash of accounting scandals such as the Enron scandal, the need for chief ethics officers has increased tremendously. The role of chief ethics officers has increased since the passage of the Sarbanes–Oxley Act (SOA), and amendments of the U.S. Federal Sentencing Guidelines (FSCO). The role of chief ethics officer is no longer a figure head position.

In 2002, after congress passed the Dodd-Frank Wall Street Reform Act and the Consumer Protection Act, the chief ethics officer's responsibilities expanded. The role both expanded and became more specific. The chief ethics officer is responsible for developing and distributing codes of ethics, developing training programs for employees, and monitoring and auditing compliance with government regulations. The chief ethics officer may also administer punishments for violation of ethical codes of conduct.

== Price ethics ==
The primary objective of pricing ethics is to prevent the establishment of monopolies, inequitable pricing practices, and reduce or restrict competition. Such laws are some times called pro-competitive legislation, which were enacted to encourage competition, and prevent activities that restrain trade.

The following are some of the acts passed by Congress, to help prevent unethical practices by businesses to manipulate prices in order to monopolize their industries, such as the Sherman Antitrust Act of 1890, which prohibits organizations from holding monopolies in their industry, the Robinson–Patman Act of 1936, which bans price discrimination between retailers and wholesalers, and the Consumer Goods Pricing Acts of 1975, which prohibits price maintenance agreements among manufactures and resellers in interstate commerce.

== Organizational ethics ==
Organizational ethics is the ethics of an organization, and it is how an organization responds to an internal or external issue. Organizational ethics is independent of the organizational culture. Organizational culture tends to display the same ethical views of the surrounding community. To reinforce positive views of the community, certain businesses give incentives to both employees and the community. Business organizations give to community by granting scholarships, funds and resources. Employees also give back to the community by contributing their time, gifts and talents. When the local residents obtain the skills from skilled employees then these individuals can apply and fulfill critical skills shortages needed by the organization. When the incentive value method represent the community in a positive way everyone wins, such as the business organization, and the community.

== Ethics in business communication ==
Ethical communication is a must for a businesses to have a long and successful future. A business cannot act unethically when dealing with its customers, employees or other businesses. Unethical communication consist of false or misleading information, which is a violation of the Federal Trade Communication. Other unethical means of marketing material, is by fraud, scams, and e-mail, or text messaging unsolicited marketing material (SPAM).
