= Chala, Gujarat =

Chala
- Census town
- Location in Gujarat, India Chala (India)
- Coordinates: 20.37796°N 72.87692°E
- Country: India
- State: Gujarat
- District: Valsad

Population (2001)
  - Total: 16,244

Languages
  - Official: Gujarati, Hindi
- Time zone: UTC+5:30 (IST)
- Vehicle registration: GJ
- Website: gujaratindia.com

Chala is a census town in Valsad district in the state of Gujarat, India.

== Demographics ==
As of 2001 India census, Chala had a population of 16,244. Males constitute 58% of the population and females 42%. Chala has an average literacy rate of 78%, higher than the national average of 59.5%; with male literacy of 83% and female literacy of 72%. 14% of the population is under 6 years of age.
