= Fantasy sports in India =

Fantasy sports came to India in the later half of the 2010s and was banned in 2025, The Federation of Indian Fantasy Sports (FIFS) served as the primary self-regulatory industry body. As of December 2023, the sector was valued at approximately ₹45,000 crore (equivalent to ₹490 billion or US$5 billion in 2026) with over 180 million active users. On August 21, 2025, Indian government banned all fantasy sports games and other real money-based online games as they were considered online gambling.

== Overview ==
India has numerous fantasy gaming mobile applications that allow users to create virtual teams for various sports. The Google Play Store does not allow these apps on their platform for download, requiring users to download them directly from their websites. These platforms attract users through sports league sponsorships, celebrity endorsements, and advertising campaigns.

=== Market size ===
According to a 2022 NITI Aayog report, the industry is expected to attract ₹10,000 crore (₹100 billion) in foreign direct investment, and reach a market value of ₹50,000 crore (₹500 billion) and expand to 200 million users or more by 2025.

== Legality ==
On August 21, 2025, Indian government banned all fantasy sports games and other real money-based online games as they were considered online gambling.

=== Supreme Court ruling ===
On 8 August 2021, the Supreme Court of India officially declared fantasy sports legal, classifying them as games of skill rather than gambling.

=== High court judgments ===
Several high courts have ruled on fantasy sports. The Rajasthan High Court in July 2021 affirmed fantasy sports as games of skill based on the 276th Law Commission Report. In April 2019 the Bombay High Court recognized fantasy sports as a legitimate skill-based industry. The Kerala High Court determined fantasy sports as games of skill under section 14(A) of the Kerala Gaming Act in February 2022.

=== State-level regulations ===
As of January 2024, states fall into three categories:

==== States permitting fantasy sports ====
- Maharashtra
- Karnataka
- Rajasthan
- Punjab
- Haryana
- West Bengal
- Uttar Pradesh

==== States with bans ====
- Telangana (complete ban since 2017)
- Andhra Pradesh (banned under Gaming Act)
- Odisha (under Gaming Act restrictions)
- Assam (under Gambling and Betting Act)
- Nagaland (requires special license)
- Sikkim (only with state license)

==== States with pending regulations ====
- Tamil Nadu (new policy under consideration)
- Kerala (reviewing regulations)
- Gujarat (draft policy in progress)

== Taxation ==
=== Changes ===
As of October 2023, key tax reforms related to fantasy sports include:

- A goods and services tax (GST) rate of 28% on full contest entry amounts
- Tax deduction at source requirements of 30% on winnings above ₹10,000, with net winnings calculated monthly
- Platform taxes, with a corporate tax on platform revenue, and state-specific gaming taxes where applicable

=== Impact ===
Tax changes have led to decreased user participation and a reduction of 20–25% in industry revenue. This has in turn generated market consolidation trends and platform operational adjustments.

== Major platforms ==
=== Market leaders ===
Platform	User base (2023)	Key features
Dream11	130+ million	Cricket, football, NBA
Mobile Premier League (MPL)	99+ million	Multi-game platform
My11Circle	50+ million	Cricket-focused
Gamezy	30+ million	Multiple sports
Vision11	20+ million	Cricket, football

=== Market share ===
Dream11 has an approximate 55% market share, MPL a ~15% share, and other companies share the remaining ~30% of the market.

== Challenges ==
=== Legal issues ===
- State-level regulatory compliance
- GST implementation disputes
- Age verification mechanisms
- Consumer protection measures
- Payment gateway restrictions

=== Court cases ===
- Tamil Nadu's appeal against fantasy sports
- GST classification disputes
- State jurisdiction challenges
- Consumer protection petitions

== Advertising guidelines ==
In November 2020, the Information and Broadcasting Ministry's Advertising Standards Council of India (ASCI) created guidelines for fantasy gaming apps doing business in India, such as:

- Fantasy apps must not permit persons under 18 to play,
- Every fantasy gaming app ad must showcase a disclaimer occupying 20% of the ad's space,
- Ads should not promote online gaming as an income opportunity,
- No ads should suggest that players are more successful than non-players.

The disclaimer must state "This game involves an element of financial risk and may be addictive. Please play responsibly and at your own risk."

== Criticism ==
=== User experiences ===
In 2019, a person claimed in an article published by Outlook that he lost ₹50,000 in just two games on Dream11, arguing that outcomes were based on chance rather than skill.

== See also ==
- Video games in India
- Online gaming in India
- Sports betting
- Indian Premier League
