= Global Esports Federation =

International esports organization

- Logo
- Formation: December 16, 2019; 6 years ago
- Type: Sports federation
- Registration no.: T21SS0039J
- Headquarters: Singapore
- Official language: English
- President: (Australia) Paul J. Foster, KStJH
- CEO: (Australia) Paul J. Foster, KStJH
- Website: globalesports.org

The Global Esports Federation (GEF) is a non-governmental organization that convenes the world's esports (or competitive video gaming) community. It was established on December 16, 2019, and is headquartered in Singapore, where it is a registered society under the Singapore Registry of Societies.

The GEF consists of 180 Member Federations and four continental Esports Development Federations (Africa, Europe, Oceania and Pan Am). As of January 2025, there are 10 Commissions and two Councils that guide the work of the federation. The founding President of the GEF was Chris Chan of Singapore. As of September 2025, Paul J. Foster is CEO, was formally elected President, having previously assumed the role of President ad interim following Chan's resignation in July 2025.

The organization's flagship event is the annual Global Esports Games (GEG), held since 2021. The GEG is a multi-title esports competition featuring athletes from Member Federations that takes place in December every year. The GEF also organizes the Global Esports Tour (GET) and supports its Member Federations in hosting local esports competitions and regional qualifying events.

== History ==
The GEF was launched on December 16, 2019 with Chris Chan appointed as its founding President. The Board currently consists of a President, six Vice-Presidents, and 15 Board Members. The GEF appointed its first Chief Executive Officer, Sir Paul J. Foster, in March 2021. Chan was re-elected as President of GEF in 2023 for a second four-year term. On 23 July 2025, following Chan's resignation, Foster was elected President ad interim by the GEF Executive Committee, and formally elected President at its Board Meeting in September 2025. Aurelia Ruetsch has been GEF Secretary General since January 2026, the first woman to hold the position.

The GEF organizes two main events: the Global Esports Games (GEG) and the Global Esports Tour (GET). The inaugural Global Esports Games were staged in Singapore in December 2021, followed by the second edition in Istanbul, Türkiye in 2022, Riyadh, Saudi Arabia in 2023, Mumbai, India in 2026, and Los Angeles in the Spring of 2027. The first season of the Global Esports Tour was staged in 2021, beginning in Los Angeles in September. Both the GEG and GET are held on an annual basis.

== GEF Board ==
Designation	Name	Country/Territory
President	Paul J. Foster, KStJH	Australia
Vice Presidents	Chester King	United Kingdom
Vice Presidents	T A Ganda Sithole	Zimbabwe
Vice Presidents	Adrian Lismore	(Republic of Ireland) Ireland
Vice Presidents	Melita N. Moore, M.D.	United States
Secretary General	Aurelia Ruetsch	France
Board Members	Ramil Aliyev	Azerbaijan
Board Members	Samba Bathily	Mali
Board Members	Stefy Bau	Italy
Board Members	Samy Bessi	Belgium
Board Members	Leo Fontes	Brazil
Board Members	Hala Ghandour	Lebanon
Board Members	Lorenzo Giorgetti	Italy
Board Members	Hideki Hayakawa	Japan
Board Members	Jay Lee	South Korea
Board Members	Jerry Ling	Singapore
Board Members	Steve Loader	Australia
Board Members	Ronny Lusigi	Kenya
Board Members	Yaqui Núñez del Risco Mejía	Dominican Republic
Board Members	Alper Afsin Özdemir	(Turkey) Türkiye
Board Members	Dana Reizniece	Latvia
Board Members	Koen Schobbers	Netherlands
Board Members	Peter Zeytoonjian	United States
Chief Executive Officer	Paul J. Foster, KStJH	Australia
Senior Advisors	Bijan Burnard	United Kingdom
Senior Advisors	Hong Li Glauser	Switzerland
Senior Advisors	Nicholas Aaron Khoo	Singapore
Senior Advisors	Ali Kiremitçioğlu	(Turkey) Türkiye
Senior Advisors	Kota Mogami	Japan
Senior Advisors	Duane Mutu	New Zealand
Senior Advisors	Hideki Okamura	Japan

== GEF Commissions & Councils ==
Commission / Council	Chair	Vice Chair
Athletes, Players, Community	Stefy Bau	Josselyn Abusabal
Brand, Marketing, Communications	Lorenzo Giorgetti	Peter Zeytoonjian
Brand, Marketing, Communications	Lorenzo Giorgetti	Alper Afsin Özdemir
Education, Culture, Youth	Jerry Ling	Dr. Dikaia Chatziefstathiou
Education, Culture, Youth	Jerry Ling	Tom Dore
Finance, Legal, Administration	Adrian Lismore	Dana Reizniece
Governance, Ethics & Membership	T A Ganda Sithole	Chester King
Governance, Ethics & Membership	T A Ganda Sithole	Sir Prof. Dr. Gabriele Pao-Pei Andreoli, MD
Governance, Ethics & Membership	T A Ganda Sithole	Ramil Aliyev, Membership
Health & Wellness	Melita N. Moore, M.D.	Ali Al Ramahi
International Relations & Development	Aurelia Ruetsch	Samy Bessi
Digital Transformation	Berkley Egenes	
GEG Coordination Commission	Melita N. Moore, M.D.	Yaqui Núñez del Risco Mejía
GEG Coordination Commission	Melita N. Moore, M.D.	Ali Kiremitçioğlu
Strategy & Impact	Victoria Cabezas Alvarez	
Youth Council	Anim Ward	
International Federations Advisory Council	Dr. Choue Chung-won	

== Member Federations ==
As of August 2026, there are 181 Member Federations in the GEF:

=== Development Federations ===
In September 2021, the GEF announced the creation of two Esports Development Federations: the Africa Esports Development Federation and the Pan Am Esports Development Federation.

In 2023, the Oceania and Europe Esports Development Federations were formed to continue the support of sustainable development of esports communities throughout the world.

== Events ==
=== Global Esports Games ===
The Global Esports Games (GEG) is a multi-title esports competition featuring athletes from Member Federations that takes place in December every year.

In May 2021, the GEF announced the host cities for the first three editions of the GEG. The inaugural GEG took place in Singapore in 2021, followed by Istanbul in 2022 and Riyadh in 2023. The 2023 edition was the largest held to date, with 950 athletes competing from more than 100 countries. Global Esports Games World Finals took place in Mumbai in March 2026. The 2026 World Finals will be held in Los Angeles in the Spring of 2027.

A variety of esports titles have been contested at the Global Esports Games, including: Valve’s Dota 2, Konami’s eFootball PES 2021 Season Update, eFootball 2023 and eFootball 2024, Capcom’s Street Fighter V and Street Fighter 6, Krafton's PUBG Mobile, and Supercell's Clash Royale.

Competition categories include Open and Women, with the Open category allowing both men and women to compete together.

==== Editions ====
Location	Dates	Event name	Titles	Category	Champion	Players
Singapore	December 17–19, 2021	Global Esports Games 2021	Dota 2	Open	Brazil	Joao Gabriel Giannini dos Santos (4nalog), Leonardo Fernandes de Gusmao (RdO), Gustavo Batista Teixeira Ribeiro (fcr), Leonardo Manulli Moraes Freitas (Manulli), Thiago de Oliveria Cordeiro (Thiolicor), Matheus Santos Jungles Diniz (KJ)
Singapore	December 17–19, 2021	Global Esports Games 2021	Dota 2	Women's	Singapore	Hui Chun TAY (Melody), Jiayi Amanda LIM (bings), Jia Ling Paula Natalaya TEO (xiaoma), Zhong En Joanne LIM (Minkiey), Sheng Ying HO (KazeL)
Singapore	December 17–19, 2021	Global Esports Games 2021	eFootball PES 2021 Season Update	Open	Brazil	Jana Victor Ferreira Lopes (CSC_Jvictor)
Singapore	December 17–19, 2021	Global Esports Games 2021	Street Fighter V	Open	Chinese Taipei	Yu-Lin HSIANG (GamerBee)
(Turkey) Istanbul	December 15–17, 2022	Global Esports Games 2022	Dota 2	Open	Peru	Bernardo David Rocca Alarcon (BernaBerna), Isaac Antonio Zavaleta Lopez (Drakell), Sebastian Axel Cerralta Velarde (Roboz), Joel Eduardo Mori Ozambela (KIM), Julian Esnaider Carbajal Ylave (FLAPJACK), Diego Fernando Perochena Salvatierra (xephondp)
(Turkey) Istanbul	December 15–17, 2022	Global Esports Games 2022	Dota 2	Women's	Thailand	Suchada Somboonthana (nana), Apinya Pinyokong (Ningendd), Rakpirach Rakchid (CatChaser), Sasiwan Pimpak (sleepless), Supanuch Hirunthanakijjakul (honeylisa), Nuttanitcha Puvasiriroj (Ntygogo)
(Turkey) Istanbul	December 15–17, 2022	Global Esports Games 2022	eFootball 2023	Open	Iran	Hassan Pajani (Hasan_Player1)
(Turkey) Istanbul	December 15–17, 2022	Global Esports Games 2022	Street Fighter V	Open	Chinese Taipei	Yu-Lin HSIANG (GamerBee)
(Turkey) Istanbul	December 15–17, 2022	Global Esports Games 2022	PUBG Mobile	Open	Vietnam	Duong Thanh DINH (DXRabizz), Anh Hao MAC (DXFrankyyy007), Hoang Hung VU (DXLamborghini), Trung Duc CHU (DXTDuccc), Van Dong PHAN (DXVicòi)
(Saudi Arabia) Riyadh	December 12–16, 2023	Global Esports Games 2023	Dota 2	Open	Kazakhstan	Askar Zhumagulov (Toshi), Salamat Sadyr (v3ndetta), Yegor Millor (egxrdemnxn), Ilyas Akhkubekov (liru01), Alexandr Pak (v1olent’)
(Saudi Arabia) Riyadh	December 12–16, 2023	Global Esports Games 2023	Dota 2	Women's	Malaysia	Vanessa Hii (Butterfly), Tiffany Teoh (Hishiko), Bette Chia (istarx), Adeline Anak Foki (velnaoh), Melissa Lim (Lynnie), Stephanie Lim (auroraa)
(Saudi Arabia) Riyadh	December 12–16, 2023	Global Esports Games 2023	eFootball 2024	Open	Jordan	Sief Adeen Jaser Fahed Dababneh (S.HACKER55)
(Saudi Arabia) Riyadh	December 12–16, 2023	Global Esports Games 2023	Street Fighter 6	Open	Dominican Republic	Bryan Diesel Tineo Marchena (BryanD)
(Saudi Arabia) Riyadh	December 12–16, 2023	Global Esports Games 2023	PUBG Mobile	Open	Ukraine	Dmytro Kuzmenko (Bamb1ni), Daniel Havlicek (KVIQQ), Dmytro Bui (TripleOldBoy), Andrii Tulika (madTUL1KA), Denys Havlicek (xqsmeHAVLIK222)
(India) Mumbai	March 19–22, 2026	Global Esports Games Mumbai	Dota 2	Open	Türkiye	Ege Dengi (Dingo), Faruk Terci (Wuiter), Abdullah Fatih Koparan (Stoic)), İsmail Bahadir Koparan (G.T.I.), Berke Can Yenigün (Jeezy), Dursun Baran Uludağ (Leni)
(India) Mumbai	March 19–22, 2026	Global Esports Games Mumbai	Clash Royale	Open	India	Anuhith Gosala
(United States) Los Angeles	Spring, 2027	Global Esports Games 2026	Clash Royale	Open / Women's	TBC	
(United States) Los Angeles	Spring, 2027	Global Esports Games 2026	Rocket League	Open	TBC	
(United States) Los Angeles	Spring, 2027	Global Esports Games 2026	Counter-Strike 2	Open	TBC	
(United States) Los Angeles	Spring, 2027	Global Esports Games 2026	Mobile Legends: Bang Bang	Open / Women's	TBC	
(United States) Los Angeles	Spring, 2027	Global Esports Games 2026	eFootball	Open / Women's	TBC	
(United States) Los Angeles	Spring, 2027	Global Esports Games 2026	iRacing featuring Ferrari	Open	TBC	
(United States) Los Angeles	Spring, 2027	Global Esports Games 2026	NBA2K	Open	TBC	

=== Global Esports Tour ===
The Global Esports Tour (GET) is a series of tournaments for professional esports athletes and teams.

In September 2021, the GEF announced the first series of the GET, with each stage showcasing a different esports title. The first edition of the GET had a total prize pool of US$500,000.

- Los Angeles, United States of America: September 27–28 - Hearthstone
- Riyadh, Saudi Arabia: October 21–23 - PUBG Mobile
- Dubai, United Arab Emirates: November 26–27 - Counter-strike: Global Offensive

In 2022, the second season of the GET was held over two stages in the cities of Dubai and Riyadh. Dubai staged a CS:GO tournament from June 10–11. Riyadh held a Street Fighter V - Champion Edition tournament from July 25–27 during the annual Gamers8 festival.

In 2023, the third season of the GET was staged in Riyadh from August 26–27 during Gamers8 festival. Participating pro athletes competed for a US$50,000 prize pool in eFootball 2023.

In 2024, Season 4 of the Global Esports Tour headed to Rio de Janeiro, Brazil with a Counter-Strike 2 tournament from April 18–21.

=== Marquee Events ===
Beginning in 2021, the Global Esports Federation began hosting esports championships at regional and continental Games. The first marquee event, named the Commonwealth Esports Championships, was held at the Birmingham 2022 Commonwealth Games. The South American Esports Championships was held in collaboration with the South American Sports Organization (ODESUR) at the Asuncion 2022 South American Games. The 2023 European Games Esports Championships was held alongside the Kraków-Małopolska 2023 European Games with support from the European Olympic Committees (EOC). The 2023 Pan American Esports Championships was held in Santiago, Chile in parallel with the Santiago 2023 Pan American Games in collaboration with Panam Sports.

== Partners ==
Tencent is a Founding Global Partner of the GEF. The federation also has a list of other strategic partners including an agreement signed with Amazon MGM Studios in January 2024, as well as with the International Telecommunication Union, Peace and Sport and UNESCO, among others. The federation announced a partnership with the Los Angeles Times Media Group, and Xsolla.

The GEF also has several key partners within the Olympic Movement, including the Commonwealth Games Federation (CGF), Olympic Council of Asia (OCA), European Olympic Committees (EOC), South American Sports Organization (ODESUR), and Centro Caribe Sports.

== See also ==
- International Esports Federation
