= International University =

International University may refer to:

- Akita International University
- Alliant International University, main campus in San Diego, California, US
- Azerbaijan International University
- Bronte International University
- Columbia International University
- Daffodil International University
- Dubrovnik International University
- Eurasia International University
- Florida International University
- Ho Chi Minh City International University
- Hope International University
- Imam Khomeini International University
- International University, Cambodia
- International University, Indonesia
- International University in Geneva
- International University of Batam
- International University of Business Agriculture and Technology
- International University of Chabahar
- International University of Japan
- International University of Monaco
- International University of Novi Pazar
- International University Vienna
- International University of Kyrgyzstan
- Isles Internationale Université (European Union)
- Jones International University
- Kyiv International University
- Latin American Faculty of Social Sciences
- LCC International University
- Lebanese International University
- Maharishi International University, renamed in 1995 to Maharishi University of Management
- Manarat International University
- Marycrest International University
- Misr International University
- Mongolia International University
- Pacific International University
- Riphah International University
- Salem International University
- Schiller International University
- Sylhet International University
- Symbiosis International University
- Texas A&M International University
- Tokyo International University
- United International University
- United States International University, San Diego, California (merged into Alliant International University in 2001)
- University for International Integration of the Afro-Brazilian Lusophony
- University of Central Asia
- Vision International University
- Washington International University
- Webber International University
- Western International University

== International Islamic University ==
- International Islamic University Malaysia
- Selangor International Islamic University, Malaysia
- International Islamic University, Islamabad
- International Islamic University, Chittagong
- Islamic University of Technology, Bangladesh

== See also ==
- International Islamic University (disambiguation)
- American International University (disambiguation)
- National University (disambiguation)
- International University Liaison Indonesia - IULI
