= National university (disambiguation) =

A national university is generally a university created or managed by a government, but which may at the same time operate autonomously without direct control by the state.

National University may also refer to:

- Australian National University
- National University, Bangladesh
- National University of Colombia
- National University of El Salvador
- Indira Gandhi National Open University, India
- National University of Ireland
- National University of Pakistan
- National University (Philippines)
- Nation University (Thailand)
- American National University, United States
- Florida National University, United States
- National University (California), United States
- National University School of Law, Washington D.C., United States
- Guozijian, the National University for many imperial Chinese and Vietnamese dynasties

== See also ==
- National American University
- National Louis University
- National Autonomous University (disambiguation)
- National Defence University (disambiguation)
- National Pedagogic University (disambiguation)
- National Technical University (disambiguation)
