= Mark Rivkin =

- Occupation: Entrepreneur
- Known for: Casino & Gaming Software; Investments

Mark Rivkin is a Canadian born investor and entrepreneur. Rivkin is the co-founder of CryptoLogic Inc., which he started with his brother Andrew Rivkin in 1995. He also co-founded QT Inc. in 2004, a Toronto-based investment company which he owns and operates with Harvey Solursh.

== About ==
Rivkin attended the University of Western Ontario before graduating in 1993. While there, he founded Campus Notes, a lecture note service used at the University of Toronto and the University of Western Ontario. After graduating, he started CryptoLogic Inc. with his brother Andrew. In 2003, Mark and Andrew left the company to explore new ventures. In 2005, he joined Groove Media Inc. as chairman, a company best known for its retail publishing activities through the Groove Games label. In 2004, Mark Rivkin co-founded QT Inc. He is a principal of the company along with Harvey Solursh.

== CryptoLogic ==
Rivkin co-founded CryptoLogic in Toronto in February 1995 with his brother, Andrew Rivkin, as young graduates still living in their parents' basement. They started the project, using their own software, as a general Internet security software company.

Despite CryptoLogic's earlier purpose, Andrew and Mark soon started to focus on online gambling, which had become a growth industry since Antigua and Barbuda became the first country to legalize the practice in 1994.

In 1996, after the brothers raised C$500,000 in venture capital, they gained their first licensee in InterCasino. InterCasino, the world's first real wager Internet casino, went online using CryptoLogic software. By 1998, CryptoLogic was considered a major player in the emerging online casino industry, with its software used by online casinos in Curaçao and Dominica as well as Antigua and Barbuda. By mid-2000, CryptoLogic software was used by over 500,000 online casino end users worldwide and processed over $4 billion in online transactions.

CryptoLogic was one of the largest online gaming platform providers in the world. The company was listed on the Toronto Stock Exchange in September 1998 and on the NASDAQ stock exchange in March 2000. Andrew and Mark Rivkin Rivkin stepped down as CEO of CryptoLogic in January 2001 but remained on the company's board of directors.

== QT Inc. ==
Mark Rivkin co-founded QT Inc with a former CFO of CryptoLogic Inc., Harvey Solursh in 2004. QT Inc. is a Toronto-based investment company that specializes in commercial and residential real estate, private and commercial investments, development, mortgages, and financing.
