= AIU =

AIU may refer to:

- Akita International University, an English-language public university in Akita, Japan
- AlAlamein International University, a national University in New Alamein, Egypt
- Ala-Too International University, a private university in Bishkek, Kyrgyzstann
- Allegheny Intermediate Unit, a branch of the Pennsylvania Department of Education
- Alliance Israélite Universelle, a Jewish educational and civil rights organization based in Paris
- Alliant International University, an American for-profit university based in San Diego, California
- American Idol Underground, former name of Artist Underground
- American InterContinental University, an American for-profit university
- American Industrial Union, a short-lived labor organization established in 1895
- American International Underwriters, former name of AIU Holdings, a subsidiary of American International Group
- American International University (disambiguation), several universities around the world
- Approximately Infinite Universe, a double album by Yoko Ono
- Association of Indian Universities, association of major universities in India
- Atlantic International University, a distance-learning university based in Hawaii
- Athletics Integrity Unit, a body founded by the International Association of Athletics Federations to combat doping in athletics
