= 2015 Austin Aces season =

WorldTeam Tennis team Austin, TX 2015

Western Conference champions
- Conference: 1st Western

Record
- 2015 record: 12 wins, 2 losses
- Home record: 6 wins, 1 loss
- Road record: 6 wins, 1 loss
- Games won–lost: 290–235

Team info
- Owner(s): Lorne Abony
- General manager: Allen Hardison
- Coach: Rick Leach
- Stadium: Gregory Gymnasium
- Average attendance: 950

The 2015 Austin Aces season was the 13th season of the franchise in World TeamTennis (WTT) and its second and final season in Greater Austin, Texas.

The Aces had the best regular-season record in WTT and defeated the California Dream in the Western Conference Championship Match. It was the first conference title for the franchise since 2006 (as the Newport Beach Breakers). The Aces fell in the WTT Final to the Washington Kastles who won their fifth consecutive King Trophy as WTT champions. The Aces were led by Teymuraz Gabashvili who was named WTT Male Most Valuable Player and Alla Kudryavtseva who was named WTT Female Rookie of the Year. Coach Rick Leach was named WTT Coach of the Year.

On December 14, 2015, the Aces' owner Lorne Abony announced that the team had been unable to find a suitable permanent venue and would move back to Orange County, California for the 2016 season and be renamed the Orange County Breakers. The Aces officially reported their average home attendance in 2014, as 2,155. However, general manager Allen Hardison said that the real figure may have been closer to 1,300. In 2015, the average attendance was approximately 950, even though the first 1,000 fans at the gates for the Western Conference Championship Match who had an online code were admitted for free. Hardison was complimentary of the staffs at both Cedar Park Center and Gregory Gymnasium, and he also noted that the fans who supported the Aces were "some of the best in the league." Hardison said that in order for a WTT franchise to survive, it has to have a venue that meets established criteria for location, venue type and availability, and that ideally offers an outdoor setting. Although the team's new home court was not immediately announced, officials with a desirable venue in Orange County had reportedly reached out to the Aces to lure them back.

== Season recap ==
=== Draft ===
At the WTT draft on March 16, 2015, the Aces protected Andy Roddick in the marquee portion of the draft. In the roster portion of the draft, the Aces didn't protect any players from their 2014 roster. They selected Nicole Gibbs, Alla Kudryavtseva, Jarmere Jenkins and Teymuraz Gabashvili.

=== Move to Downtown Austin ===
On March 30, 2015, the Aces announced the team would play its 2015 home matches at the Gregory Gymnasium in Downtown Austin. The team expects that the venue, currently primarily used for women's college volleyball, will seat more than 3,500 fans when configured for tennis. Aces owner Lorne Abony said, "As soon as the 2014 season ended, we began evaluating all aspects of this team, from the record on the court to the sponsorships sold to the number of fans in the stands. From feedback we received and the analysis that was done by our front office, we felt that a relocation to a venue located closer to the city center would be in our team's best interest. We are thrilled to have been able to find a downtown home in Gregory Gym on the UT campus as the Aces work to become Austin’s premier professional sports brand and the must-attend sporting event each summer."

=== Roddick out for the season ===
On July 13, 2015, the Aces announced that their marquee player, Andy Roddick, would miss the entire 2015 season with an ankle injury. Roddick was injured in London working as a television commentator for the BBC's coverage of the 2015 Wimbledon Championships. The Aces offered all fans with paid tickets to their July 16 home opener at which Roddick was scheduled to play complementary vouchers redeemable for a tickets to a future Aces home match.

=== Opening day ===
Just hours after receiving the news that Andy Roddick would miss the season, the Aces opened up on the road against the Boston Lobsters. Teymuraz Gabashvili won the opening set of men's singles, 5–2, and Alla Kudryavtseva and Nicole Gibbs followed with a 5–4 women's doubles set win to give the Aces a 10–6 lead. After the Aces dropped the mixed doubles set, Gibbs took the fourth set in women's singles, 5–2, to give the Aces a 17–13 lead heading to the final set. Gabashvili and Jarmere Jenkins dropped the men's doubles set, 5–4, but won the first game of extended play to secure a 22–18 victory.

=== First match in Downtown Austin ===
After a successful season-opening road trip that included an upset victory over the four-time defending WTT champion Washington Kastles, the Aces returned to their new home in Downtown Austin as the only undefeated team in WTT with 2 wins and 0 losses. After the Aces lost the opening set of women's doubles, 5–2, they found themselves trailing the California Dream in the mixed doubles set, 4–2, and in the match, 9–4. But after the Dream substituted Jarmila Gajdošová for Anabel Medina Garrigues, the Aces turned the set around and took it, 5–4. It was a powerful backhand down the line by Alla Kudryavtseva to convert a break point that seemed to turn around the set and the match and get the home crowd behind the Aces. Jarmere Jenkins and Teymuraz Gabashvili took the third set of men's doubles, 5–2, and the Aces had a 12–11 halftime lead. Gajdošová took the fourth set of women's singles from Nicole Gibbs to put the Dream back in front, 16–15. But Gabashvili secured a 20–19 victory for the Aces by taking the final set of men's singles, 5–3.

=== Another comeback win ===
In their fifth match of the season, the Aces hosted the Springfield Lasers on July 18, at Gregory Gymnasium. The Lasers won the first two sets to take a 10–3 lead in the match. Alla Kudryavtseva and Teymuraz Gabashvili got the comeback started by taking the third set of mixed doubles, 5–2, to cut the Lasers' lead to 12–8. Jarmere Jenkins and Gabashvili took a tiebreaker in men's doubles for a 5–4 set win that cut the deficit to 16–13 heading to the final set. Gabashvili's powerful serve was too much for Michael Russell to handle, and a 5–2 set win in men's singles for the Aces tied the score of the match at 18. Gabashvili overwhelmed Russell in the super tiebreaker, 7–1, to earn a dramatic 19–18 victory for the Aces.

=== Eight-match winning streak ===
The Aces season-opening winning streak reached eight matches on July 22, with a 23–16 road win over the Springfield Lasers. The Aces won four of the five sets led by Nicole Gibbs who closed the match with a 5–1 set win in women's singles after earlier teaming with Alla Kudryavtseva for a 5–3 set win in women's doubles. Kudryavtseva and Teymuraz Gabashvili won the mixed doubles set, and Gabashvili opened the match by winning the men's singles set. The Aces suffered their first loss of the season the following evening against the Philadelphia Freedoms.

=== Clinching a playoff berth ===
The Aces stumbled into their July 26 home match against the defending Western Conference champion San Diego Aviators having lost their previous two matches. With an opportunity to clinch a playoff berth in front of the home fans, the Aces responded with a dominant performance winning all five sets for a 25–8 victory. In registering their biggest margin of victory of the season, the Aces earned the franchise's first playoff berth since 2012. The Aces won two sets by 5–0 scores: Nicole Gibbs in women's singles and Gibbs and Alla Kudryavtseva in women's doubles. Kudryavtseva and Teymuraz Gabashvili opened the match with a 5–3 set win in mixed doubles. Gabashvili and Jarmere Jenkins took the men's doubles, 5–2. With the Aces leading 20–5 after four sets, Jenkins made his Aces singles debut and responded with a 5–3 set win, breaking serve in the eighth game to secure the victory.

=== Aces sign Svitolina ===
On July 27, 2015, the Aces announced they had signed Elina Svitolina, the 20th ranked female player in the world at the time, as a wildcard player. With three matches remaining in the regular season, Svitolina would be eligible to play for the Aces in the playoffs if she appeared in all three of those matches. That same day, Svitolina made her Aces debut on the road against the San Diego Aviators.

=== A first-place finish ===
The Aces clinched the top seed in the Western Conference and home-court advantage for the Western Conference Championship Match on July 27, when the Washington Kastles defeated the California Dream, 19–17. Later that evening, the Aces earned a road victory against the San Diego Aviators, 25–13, in extended play to improve their record to 10 wins and 2 losses.

=== Best record in WTT ===
On July 28, 2015, the Aces welcomed the four-time defending WTT champion Washington Kastles to Gregory Gymnasium with a chance to clinch the best overall regular-season record in WTT for 2015. Trailing 10–7 after two sets, Teymuraz Gabashvili gave the Aces a 12–10 lead with a 5–0 set win over Sam Querrey in men's singles. After dropping the fourth set of mixed doubles, the Aces found themselves trailing, 15–14, heading into the final set of women's singles. Elina Svitolina, making her Aces home debut, topped Madison Brengle, 5–1, to give the Aces a 19–16 victory and the best overall regular-season record in WTT for 2015.

=== Western Conference championship ===
The Aces hosted the California Dream in the Western Conference Championship Match on July 30, 2015. The originally-scheduled start time of the match of 7:00 p.m. CDT was pushed back, because weather issues caused the Dream's flight to be delayed. The first ball was finally struck at 9:43 p.m. CDT, and the Aces took charge from the start with Teymuraz Gabashvili and Alla Kudryavtseva opening the match with a 5–2 set win in mixed doubles. Kudryavtseva and Elina Svitolina followed with a 5–3 set win in women's doubles to give the Aces a 10–5 lead. Gabashvili and Jarmere Jenkins won a tiebreaker in men's doubles to increase the Aces' lead to 15–9 at halftime. Svitolina broke Jarmila Gajdošová, the top-ranked player in WTT in women's singles during the regular season, in the fourth and sixth games of the set for a 5–1 win and a 20–10 Aces lead with one set remaining. With the clock having already struck midnight, Gabashvili served an ace to end the tiebreaker in men's singles and give the Aces a dominant 25–14 victory and the Western Conference championship. The Aces won all five sets in securing the franchise's first conference title since 2006, when they were the Newport Beach Breakers. After the match, Gabashvili said, "It was amazing. I didn’t have a lot of pressure because my team did fantastic. We found our energy and showed our best. I am feeling great on the court."

=== WTT Final ===
The Aces fell in the WTT Final on August 2, 2015, to the Washington Kastles who won their fifth consecutive King Trophy as WTT champions. The Kastles were led by WTT Final Most Valuable Player Leander Paes who teamed with Martina Hingis to take the opening set of mixed doubles from Teymuraz Gabashvili and Alla Kudryavtseva, 5–2, and then with Sam Querrey to win the men's doubles set, 5–3, over Gabashvili and Jarmere Jenkins. With the Kastles having won the first four sets and leading 20–13, Elina Svitolina faced Madison Brengle in the final set of women's singles. Svitolina fell behind a break early in the set but broke back twice for a 5–3 set win that sent the match to extended play with the Kastles leading, 23–18. Brengle hit a backhand winner in the first game of extended play to end the match and secure the title for the Kastles.

== Event chronology ==
- March 16, 2015: The Aces protected Andy Roddick and chose Nicole Gibbs, Alla Kudryavtseva, Jarmere Jenkins and Teymuraz Gabashvili at the WTT draft.
- July 16, 2015: The Aces won their first home match at Gregory Gymnasium, 20–19, against the California Dream.
- July 26, 2015: With a record of 9 wins and 2 losses, the Aces clinched a playoff berth with a 25–8 win over the San Diego Aviators.
- July 27, 2015: The Aces signed Elina Svitolina as a wildcard player.
- July 27, 2015: With a record of 9 wins and 2 losses, the Aces clinched first place in the Western Conference and home-court advantage for the Western Conference Championship Match when the Washington Kastles defeated the California Dream, 19–17.
- July 28, 2015: With a record of 11 wins and 2 losses, the Aces clinched the best overall regular-season record in WTT with a 19–16 win over the Washington Kastles.
- July 30, 2015: The Aces won the Western Conference championship with a 25–14 home victory over the California Dream.
- August 2, 2015: The Aces lost the WTT Final to the Washington Kastles, 24–18, in extended play.
- December 14, 2015: The Aces announced that the team would move back to Orange County, California for the 2016 season and be renamed the Orange County Breakers.

== Draft picks ==
Since the Aces had the best record among the three nonplayoff teams in 2014, they selected third in each round of the draft. Unlike previous seasons in which WTT conducted its Marquee Player Draft and its Roster Player Draft on different dates about one month apart, the league conducted a single draft at the Indian Wells Tennis Garden in Indian Wells, California on March 16, 2015. The selections made by the Aces are shown in the table below.

Draft type	Round	No.	Overall	Player chosen	Prot?
Marquee	1	3	3	(United States) Andy Roddick	Y
Marquee	2	3	10	Pass	–
Marquee	3	3	17	Pass	–
Roster	1	3	3	(United States) Nicole Gibbs	N
Roster	2	3	10	(Russia) Alla Kudryavtseva	N
Roster	3	3	17	(United States) Jarmere Jenkins	N
Roster	4	3	24	(Russia) Teymuraz Gabashvili	N

== Match log ==
=== Regular season ===
Legend
Aces Win	Aces Loss
Home team in CAPS

Match	Date	Venue and location	Result and details	Record
1	July 13	Boston Lobsters Tennis Center at the Manchester Athletic Club; Manchester-by-the-Sea, Massachusetts	Austin Aces 22, BOSTON LOBSTERS 18 (extended play) * MS: Teymuraz Gabashvili (Aces) 5, Alex Kuznetsov (Lobsters) 2 * WD: Alla Kudryavtseva/Nicole Gibbs (Aces) 5, Arantxa Parra Santonja/Irina Falconi (Lobsters) 4 * XD: Arantxa Parra Santonja/Scott Lipsky (Lobsters) 5, Alla Kudryavtseva/Teymuraz Gabashvili (Aces) 2 * WS: Nicole Gibbs (Aces) 5, Irina Falconi (Lobsters) 2 * MD: Scott Lipsky/Alex Kuznetsov (Lobsters) 5, Teymuraz Gabashvili/Jarmere Jenkins (Aces) 4 * EP - MD: Teymuraz Gabashvili/Jarmere Jenkins (Aces) 1, Scott Lipsky/Alex Kuznetsov (Lobsters) 0	1–0
2	July 14	Kastles Stadium at the Charles E. Smith Center; Washington, District of Columbia	Austin Aces 22, WASHINGTON KASTLES 17 * MS: Denis Kudla (Kastles) 5, Teymuraz Gabashvili (Aces) 4 * WD: Nicole Gibbs/Alla Kudryavtseva (Aces) 5, Venus Williams/Anastasia Rodionova (Kastles) 1 * MD: Teymuraz Gabashvili/Jarmere Jenkins (Aces) 5, Denis Kudla/Leander Paes (Kastles) 3 * WS: Venus Williams (Kastles) 5, Nicole Gibbs (Aces) 3 * XD: Teymuraz Gabashvili/Alla Kudryavtseva (Aces) 5, Venus Williams/Leander Paes (Kastles) 3	2–0
3	July 16	Gregory Gymnasium; Austin, Texas	AUSTIN ACES 20, California Dream 19 * WD: Jarmila Gajdošová/Anabel Medina Garrigues (Dream) 5, Nicole Gibbs/Alla Kudryavtseva (Aces) 2 * XD: Alla Kudryavtseva/Teymuraz Gabashvili (Aces) 5, Jarmila Gajdošová/Neal Skupski (Dream) 4 *** Jarmila Gajdošová substituted for Anabel Medina Garrigues at 4–2 * MD: Jarmere Jenkins/Teymuraz Gabashvili (Aces) 5, Tennys Sandgren/Neal Skupski (Dream) 2 * WS: Jarmila Gajdošová (Dream) 5, Nicole Gibbs (Aces) 3 * MS: Teymuraz Gabashvili (Aces) 5, Tennys Sandgren (Dream) 3	3–0
4	July 17	Dream Stadium at Sunrise Mall; Citrus Heights, California	Austin Aces 22, CALIFORNIA DREAM 16 * MD: Neal Skupski/Tennys Sandgren (Dream) 5, Jarmere Jenkins/Teymuraz Gabashvili (Aces) 2 * WD: Nicole Gibbs/Alla Kudryavtseva (Aces) 5, Anabel Medina Garrigues/Jarmila Gajdošová (Dream) 3 * XD: Teymuraz Gabashvili/Alla Kudryavtseva (Aces) 5, Neal Skupski/Jarmila Gajdošová (Dream) 1 * MS: Teymuraz Gabashvili (Aces) 5, Tennys Sandgren (Dream) 3 * WS: Nicole Gibbs (Aces) 5, Jarmila Gajdošová (Dream) 4	4–0
5	July 18	Gregory Gymnasium; Austin, Texas	AUSTIN ACES 19, Springfield Lasers 18 (super tiebreaker, 7–1) * WD: Anna-Lena Grönefeld/Sachia Vickery (Lasers) 5, Nicole Gibbs/Alla Kudryavtseva (Aces) 2 * WS: Sachia Vickery (Lasers) 5, Alla Kudryavtseva (Aces) 1 *** Alla Kudryavtseva substituted for Nicole Gibbs at 1–4 * XD: Alla Kudryavtseva/Teymuraz Gabashvili (Aces) 5, Anna-Lena Grönefeld/Andre Begemann (Lasers) 2 * MD: Teymuraz Gabashvili/Jarmere Jenkins (Aces) 5, Andre Begemann/Michael Russell (Lasers) 4 * MS: Teymuraz Gabashvili (Aces) 5, Michael Russell (Lasers) 2 * STB - MS: Teymuraz Gabashvili (Aces) 7, Michael Russell (Lasers) 1	5–0
6	July 19	Gregory Gymnasium; Austin, Texas	AUSTIN ACES 20, California Dream 18 * MD: Teymuraz Gabashvili/Jarmere Jenkins (Aces) 5, Tennys Sandgren/Neal Skupski (Dream) 4 * WS: Jarmila Gajdošová (Dream) 5, Nicole Gibbs (Aces) 3 * XD: Anabel Medina Garrigues/Neal Skupski (Dream) 5, Alla Kudryavtseva/Teymuraz Gabashvili (Aces) 2 * WD: Nicole Gibbs/Alla Kudryavtseva (Aces) 5, Jarmila Gajdošová/Anabel Medina Garrigues (Dream) 2 * MS: Teymuraz Gabashvili (Aces) 5, Tennys Sandgren (Dream) 2	6–0
7	July 20	Omni La Costa Resort and Spa; Carlsbad, California	Austin Aces 24, SAN DIEGO AVIATORS 17 * MD: Jarmere Jenkins/Teymuraz Gabashvili (Aces) 5, Raven Klaasen/Taylor Fritz (Aviators) 4 * WS: Chanelle Scheepers (Aviators) 5, Nicole Gibbs (Aces) 4 * MS: Teymuraz Gabashvili (Aces) 5, Taylor Fritz (Aviators) 3 * WD: Nicole Gibbs/Alla Kudryavtseva (Aces) 5, Chanelle Scheepers/Darija Jurak (Aviators) 3 * XD: Teymuraz Gabashvili/Alla Kudryavtseva (Aces) 5, Raven Klaasen/Darija Jurak (Aviators) 2	7–0
8	July 22	Mediacom Stadium at Cooper Tennis Complex; Springfield, Missouri	Austin Aces 23, SPRINGFIELD LASERS 16 * MS: Teymuraz Gabashvili (Aces) 5, Michael Russell (Lasers) 3 * XD: Alla Kudryavtseva/Teymuraz Gabashvili (Aces) 5, Anna-Lena Grönefeld/Andre Begemann (Lasers) 4 * MD: Andre Begemann/Michael Russell (Lasers) 5, Teymuraz Gabashvili/Jarmere Jenkins (Aces) 3 * WD: Nicole Gibbs/Alla Kudryavtseva (Aces) 5, Anna-Lena Grönefeld/Alison Riske (Lasers) 3 * WS: Nicole Gibbs (Aces) 5, Alison Riske (Lasers) 1	8–0
9	July 23	The Pavilion; Radnor Township, Pennsylvania	PHILADELPHIA FREEDOMS 22, Austin Aces 14 (extended play) * MS: Robby Ginepri (Freedoms) 5, Teymuraz Gabashvili (Aces) 2 * WS: Taylor Townsend (Freedoms) 5, Nicole Gibbs (Aces) 3 * MD: Robby Ginepri/Marcelo Melo (Freedoms) 5, Teymuraz Gabashvili/Jarmere Jenkins (Aces) 3 * WD: Abigail Spears/Taylor Townsend (Freedoms) 5, Nicole Gibbs/Alla Kudryavtseva (Aces) 1 * XD: Alla Kudryavtseva/Jarmere Jenkins (Aces) 5, Taylor Townsend/Marcelo Melo (Freedoms) 1 * EP - XD: Taylor Townsend/Marcelo Melo (Freedoms) 1, Alla Kudryavtseva/Jarmere Jenkins (Aces) 0	8–1
10	July 24	Gregory Gymnasium; Austin, Texas	Washington Kastles 22, AUSTIN ACES 14 * XD: Martina Hingis/Leander Paes (Kastles) 5, Alla Kudryavtseva/Teymuraz Gabashvili (Aces) 3 * WD: Martina Hingis/Anastasia Rodionova (Kastles) 5, Nicole Gibbs/Alla Kudryavtseva (Aces) 1 * WS: Nicole Gibbs (Aces) 5, Anastasia Rodionova (Kastles) 2 * MD: Leander Paes/Sam Querrey (Kastles) 5, Teymuraz Gabashvili/Jarmere Jenkins (Aces) 2 * MS: Sam Querrey (Kastles) 5, Teymuraz Gabashvili (Aces) 3	8–2
11	July 26	Gregory Gymnasium; Austin, Texas	AUSTIN ACES 25, San Diego Aviators 8 * XD: Teymuraz Gabashvili/Alla Kudryavtseva (Aces) 5, Raven Klaasen/Darija Jurak (Aviators) 3 * WD: Alla Kudryavtseva/Nicole Gibbs (Aces) 5, Chanelle Scheepers/Darija Jurak (Aviators) 0 * MD: Jarmere Jenkins/Teymuraz Gabashvili (Aces) 5, Raven Klaasen/Taylor Fritz (Aviators) 2 * WS: Nicole Gibbs (Aces) 5, Chanelle Scheepers (Aviators) 0 * MS: Jarmere Jenkins (Aces) 5, Taylor Fritz (Aviators) 3	9–2
12	July 27	Omni La Costa Resort and Spa; Carlsbad, California	Austin Aces 25, SAN DIEGO AVIATORS 13 (extended play) * MD: Teymuraz Gabashvili/Jarmere Jenkins (Aces) 5, Taylor Fritz/Raven Klaasen (Aviators) 0 * WD: Alla Kudryavtseva/Elina Svitolina (Aces) 5, Madison Keys/Darija Jurak (Aviators) 0 * MS: Teymuraz Gabashvili (Aces) 5, Taylor Fritz (Aviators) 3 * XD: Teymuraz Gabashvili/Alla Kudryavtseva (Aces) 5, Raven Klaasen/Darija Jurak (Aviators) 2 * WS: Madison Keys (Aviators) 5, Nicole Gibbs (Aces) 4 * EP - WS: Madison Keys (Aviators) 3, Nicole Gibbs (Aces) 1	10–2
13	July 28	Gregory Gymnasium; Austin, Texas	AUSTIN ACES 19, Washington Kastles 16 * MD: Leander Paes/Sam Querrey (Kastles) 5, Teymuraz Gabashvili/Jarmere Jenkins (Aces) 4 * WD: Anastasia Rodionova/Madison Brengle (Kastles) 5, Elina Svitolina/Alla Kudryavtseva (Aces) 3 * MS: Teymuraz Gabashvili (Aces) 5, Sam Querrey (Kastles) 0 * XD: Anastasia Rodionova/Leander Paes (Kastles) 5, Alla Kudryavtseva/Teymuraz Gabashvili (Aces) 2 * WS: Elina Svitolina (Aces) 5, Madison Brengle (Kastles) 1	11–2
14	July 29	Gregory Gymnasium; Austin, Texas	AUSTIN ACES 21, Springfield Lasers 15 * MD: Teymuraz Gabashvili/Jarmere Jenkins (Aces) 5, Michael Russell/Andre Begemann (Lasers) 4 * WD: Alison Riske/Anna-Lena Grönefeld (Lasers) 5, Elina Svitolina/Alla Kudryavtseva (Aces) 1 * MS: Teymuraz Gabashvili (Aces) 5, Michael Russell (Lasers) 2 * XD: Teymuraz Gabashvili/Alla Kudryavtseva (Aces) 5, Andre Begemann/Anna-Lena Grönefeld (Lasers) 1 * WS: Elina Svitolina (Aces) 5, Alison Riske (Lasers) 3	12–2

=== Playoffs ===
Legend
Aces Win	Aces Loss
Home team in CAPS

Western Conference Championship Match

Date	Venue and location	Result and details
July 30	Gregory Gymnasium; Austin, Texas	AUSTIN ACES 25, California Dream 14 * XD: Teymuraz Gabashvili/Alla Kudryavtseva (Aces) 5, Neal Skupski/Anabel Medina Garrigues (Dream) 2 * WD: Alla Kudryavtseva/Elina Svitolina (Aces) 5, Anabel Medina Garrigues/Jarmila Gajdošová (Dream) 3 * MD: Jarmere Jenkins/Teymuraz Gabashvili (Aces) 5, Neal Skupski/Tennys Sandgren (Dream) 4 * WS: Elina Svitolina (Aces) 5, Jarmila Gajdošová (Dream) 1 * MS: Teymuraz Gabashvili (Aces) 5, Tennys Sandgren (Dream) 4

World TeamTennis Championship Match

Date	Venue and location	Result and details
August 2	Kastles Stadium at the Charles E. Smith Center; Washington, District of Columbia	Washington Kastles 24, AUSTIN ACES (Note: Prior to the start of the season, WTT determined that the World TeamTennis Championship Match would be played on the home court of the Eastern Conference champion. The Aces, as the higher seed, were treated as the "home" team under WTT rules for determining order of play.) 18 (extended play) * XD: Martina Hingis/Leander Paes (Kastles) 5, Alla Kudryavtseva/Teymuraz Gabashvili (Aces) 2 * WD: Martina Hingis/Anastasia Rodionova (Kastles) 5, Elina Svitolina/Alla Kudryavtseva (Aces) 4 * MD: Leander Paes/Sam Querrey (Kastles) 5, Teymuraz Gabashvili/Jarmere Jenkins (Aces) 3 * MS: Sam Querrey (Kastles) 5, Teymuraz Gabashvili (Aces) 4 * WS: Elina Svitolina (Aces) 5, Madison Brengle (Kastles) 3 * EP - WS: Madison Brengle (Kastles) 1, Elina Svitolina (Aces) 0

== Team personnel ==
=== On-court personnel ===
- (United States) Rick Leach – Head Coach
- (Russia) Teymuraz Gabashvili
- (United States) Nicole Gibbs
- (United States) Jarmere Jenkins
- (Russia) Alla Kudryavtseva
- (United States) Andy Roddick (injured, did not play)
- (Ukraine) Elina Svitolina

=== Front office ===
- Lorne Abony – Owner
- Allen Hardison – General Manager

== Statistics ==
Players are listed in order of their game-winning percentage provided they played in at least 40% of the Aces' games in that event, which is the WTT minimum for qualification for league leaders in individual statistical categories.

Men's singles - regular season

Player	GP	GW	GL	PCT	A	DF	BPW	BPP	BP%	3APW	3APP	3AP%
Teymuraz Gabashvili	98	60	38	.612	26	17	14	29	.483	15	21	.714
Jarmere Jenkins	8	5	3	.625	1	0	1	2	.500	2	3	.667
Total	106	65	41	.613	27	17	15	31	.484	17	24	.708

Women's singles - regular season

Player	GP	GW	GL	PCT	A	DF	BPW	BPP	BP%	3APW	3APP	3AP%
Nicole Gibbs	93	47	46	.505	11	17	14	25	.640	14	22	.636
Elina Svitolina	14	10	4	.714	2	1	3	8	.375	1	4	.250
Alla Kudryavtseva	1	0	1	.000	0	2	1	1	1.000	0	0	-
Total	108	57	51	.528	13	20	18	34	.529	15	26	.577

Men's doubles - regular season

Player	GP	GW	GL	PCT	A	DF	BPW	BPP	BP%	3APW	3APP	3AP%
Teymuraz Gabashvili	112	59	53	.527	10	18	15	45	.333	15	26	.577
Jarmere Jenkins	112	59	53	.527	3	10	15	45	.333	15	26	.577
Total	112	59	53	.527	13	28	15	45	.333	15	26	.577

Women's doubles - regular season

Player	GP	GW	GL	PCT	A	DF	BPW	BPP	BP%	3APW	3APP	3AP%
Nicole Gibbs	77	41	36	.532	0	5	14	24	.583	12	19	.632
Alla Kudryavtseva	96	50	46	.521	1	6	17	29	.586	14	21	.667
Elina Svitolina	19	9	10	.474	2	0	3	5	.600	2	2	1.000
Total	96	50	46	.521	3	11	17	29	.586	14	21	.667

Mixed doubles - regular season

Player	GP	GW	GL	PCT	A	DF	BPW	BPP	BP%	3APW	3APP	3AP%
Alla Kudryavtseva	103	59	44	.573	5	12	16	31	.516	16	27	.593
Teymuraz Gabashvili	96	54	42	.563	16	6	14	28	.500	14	25	.560
Jarmere Jenkins	7	5	2	.714	0	0	2	3	.667	2	2	1.000
Total	103	59	44	.573	21	18	16	31	.516	16	27	.593

Team totals - regular season

Event	GP	GW	GL	PCT	A	DF	BPW	BPP	BP%	3APW	3APP	3AP%
Men's singles	106	65	41	.613	27	17	15	31	.484	17	24	.708
Women's singles	108	57	51	.528	13	20	18	34	.529	15	26	.577
Men's doubles	112	59	53	.527	13	28	15	45	.333	15	26	.577
Women's doubles	96	50	46	.521	3	11	17	29	.586	14	21	.667
Mixed doubles	103	59	44	.573	21	18	16	31	.516	16	27	.593
Total	525	290	235	.552	77	94	81	170	.476	77	124	.621

Men's singles - playoffs

Player	GP	GW	GL	PCT	A	DF	BPW	BPP	BP%	3APW	3APP	3AP%
Teymuraz Gabashvili	18	9	9	.500	7	0	0	4	.000	0	2	.000
Total	18	9	9	.500	7	0	0	4	.000	0	2	.000

Women's singles - playoffs

Player	GP	GW	GL	PCT	A	DF	BPW	BPP	BP%	3APW	3APP	3AP%
Elina Svitolina	15	10	5	.667	1	1	4	14	.286	3	6	.500
Total	15	10	5	.667	1	1	4	14	.286	3	6	.500

Men's doubles - playoffs

Player	GP	GW	GL	PCT	A	DF	BPW	BPP	BP%	3APW	3APP	3AP%
Teymuraz Gabashvili	17	8	9	.471	1	0	1	3	.333	1	3	.333
Jarmere Jenkins	17	8	9	.471	1	1	1	3	.333	1	3	.333
Total	17	8	9	.471	2	1	1	3	.333	1	3	.333

Women's doubles - playoffs

Player	GP	GW	GL	PCT	A	DF	BPW	BPP	BP%	3APW	3APP	3AP%
Alla Kudryavtseva	17	9	8	.529	0	0	4	13	.308	3	6	.500
Elina Svitolina	17	9	8	.529	0	1	4	13	.308	3	6	.500
Total	17	9	8	.529	0	1	4	13	.308	3	6	.500

Mixed doubles - playoffs

Player	GP	GW	GL	PCT	A	DF	BPW	BPP	BP%	3APW	3APP	3AP%
Teymuraz Gabashvili	14	7	7	.500	0	1	1	1	1.000	2	3	.667
Alla Kudryavtseva	14	7	7	.500	0	2	1	1	1.000	2	3	.667
Total	14	7	7	.500	0	3	1	1	1.000	2	3	.667

Team totals - playoffs

Event	GP	GW	GL	PCT	A	DF	BPW	BPP	BP%	3APW	3APP	3AP%
Men's singles	18	9	9	.500	7	0	0	4	.000	0	2	.000
Women's singles	15	10	5	.667	1	1	4	14	.286	3	6	.500
Men's doubles	17	8	9	.471	2	1	1	3	.333	1	3	.333
Women's doubles	17	9	8	.529	0	1	4	13	.308	3	6	.500
Mixed doubles	14	7	7	.500	0	3	1	1	1.000	2	3	.667
Total	81	43	38	.531	10	6	10	35	.286	9	20	.450

Men's singles - all matches

Player	GP	GW	GL	PCT	A	DF	BPW	BPP	BP%	3APW	3APP	3AP%
Teymuraz Gabashvili	116	69	47	.595	33	17	14	33	.424	15	23	.652
Jarmere Jenkins	8	5	3	.625	1	0	1	2	.500	2	3	.667
Total	124	74	50	.597	34	17	15	35	.429	17	26	.654

Women's singles - all matches

Player	GP	GW	GL	PCT	A	DF	BPW	BPP	BP%	3APW	3APP	3AP%
Nicole Gibbs	93	47	46	.505	11	17	14	25	.640	14	22	.636
Elina Svitolina	29	20	9	.690	3	2	7	22	.318	4	10	.400
Alla Kudryavtseva	1	0	1	.000	0	2	1	1	1.000	0	0	-
Total	123	67	56	.545	14	21	22	48	.458	18	32	.563

Men's doubles - all matches

Player	GP	GW	GL	PCT	A	DF	BPW	BPP	BP%	3APW	3APP	3AP%
Teymuraz Gabashvili	129	67	62	.519	11	18	16	48	.333	16	29	.552
Jarmere Jenkins	129	67	62	.519	4	11	16	48	.333	16	29	.552
Total	129	67	62	.519	15	29	16	48	.333	16	29	.552

Women's doubles - all matches

Player	GP	GW	GL	PCT	A	DF	BPW	BPP	BP%	3APW	3APP	3AP%
Nicole Gibbs	77	41	36	.532	0	5	14	24	.583	12	19	.632
Alla Kudryavtseva	113	59	54	.522	1	6	21	42	.500	17	27	.630
Elina Svitolina	36	18	18	.500	2	1	7	18	.389	5	8	.625
Total	113	59	54	.522	3	12	21	42	.500	17	27	.630

Mixed doubles - all matches

Player	GP	GW	GL	PCT	A	DF	BPW	BPP	BP%	3APW	3APP	3AP%
Alla Kudryavtseva	117	66	51	.564	5	14	17	32	.531	18	30	.600
Teymuraz Gabashvili	110	61	49	.555	16	7	15	29	.517	16	28	.571
Jarmere Jenkins	7	5	2	.714	0	0	2	3	.667	2	2	1.000
Total	117	66	51	.564	21	21	17	32	.531	18	30	.600

Team totals - all matches

Event	GP	GW	GL	PCT	A	DF	BPW	BPP	BP%	3APW	3APP	3AP%
Men's singles	124	74	50	.597	34	17	15	35	.429	17	26	.654
Women's singles	123	67	56	.545	14	21	22	48	.458	18	32	.563
Men's doubles	129	67	62	.519	15	29	16	48	.333	16	29	.552
Women's doubles	113	59	54	.522	3	12	21	42	.500	17	27	.630
Mixed doubles	117	66	51	.564	21	21	17	32	.531	18	30	.600
Total	606	333	273	.550	87	100	91	205	.444	86	144	.597

== Transactions ==
- March 16, 2015: The Aces protected Andy Roddick and chose Nicole Gibbs, Alla Kudryavtseva, Jarmere Jenkins and Teymuraz Gabashvili at the WTT draft.
- March 16, 2015: The Aces left Marion Bartoli, Eva Hrdinová, Treat Huey and Vera Zvonareva unprotected at the WTT Draft effectively making them all free agents.
- July 27, 2015: The Aces signed Elina Svitolina as a wildcard player.

== Individual honors and achievements ==
The following table shows individual honors bestowed upon players and coaches of the Austin Aces in 2015.

Player/Coach	Award
Teymuraz Gabashvili	Male Most Valuable Player
Alla Kudryavtseva	Female Rookie of the Year
Rick Leach	Coach of the Year

Teymuraz Gabashvili led WTT in winning percentage in men's singles. He was tied with Jarmere Jenkins for fourth in men's doubles, and he was fifth in mixed doubles. Alla Kudryavtseva was third in WTT in winning percentage in mixed doubles and sixth in women's doubles. Nicole Gibbs was fifth in WTT in winning percentage in women's doubles.

== See also ==
- World TeamTennis
- Sports in Austin, Texas
