= BlackTV247 =

Video website

- Company type: Private Subsidiary of BTV247, Inc.
- Website type: video sharing
- Available in: English
- Headquarters: Los Angeles, {{{location_country}}}
- Owner: BTV247, Inc
- Founders: Justin Beckett; Cecil Cox
- Website: BlackTV247
- Registration: Optional (required to upload)
- Launched: January 2010
- Current status: active

BlackTV247 is an Internet-based video website which features Black inspired programming. The site has over 16 different channels and claims to have the world's largest library of Black inspired programming.

BlackTV247 employs a two-pronged programming strategy whereby it both hosts programming on its own network and links to programming hosted on external networks. Although the majority of the programming on BlackTV247 is produced by third parties, the site also broadcasts its own original programs including, The Best of BlackTV247.com and BlackTV247 News.

BlackTV247 debuted on January 27, 2010 and is a wholly owned subsidiary of Los Angeles-based BTV247, Inc and was conceived by BTV247, Inc. founders, Justin Beckett and Cecil Cox.

== Channels ==
As of February 2010, BlackTV247 has over 16 different channels including TV. Film, Comedy, Sports, Shorts, Music Video, Critic's Choice, Faith Based, Politics, Dance, Business, International, Education, Music Programming, Lifestyle and Haiti Relief.

== Original Programming ==
BlackTV247's sister company, BTV Productions, provides the network and its affiliates with original programming. Examples of the type of original programming that appears on BlackTV247 includes The Trial of Huey Newton, developed in partnership with the Dr. Huey P. Newton Foundation, BlackTV247 News and the Best of BlackTV247.com, which features Miss Brittany Bell, Miss Arizona USA 2010.

== Availability ==
Over 75% of BlackTV247's content is viewable from anywhere in the world.
