= Al-Jam'iyya al-Islamiyya =

Al-Jam'iyya al-Islamiyya (Arabic: الجمعية الإسلامية) may refer to:

- Islamic Society of North America
- Muslim American Society
- American Muslim Society
- Al-Jam'iyya al-Islamiyya al-Wataniyya, a Zionist-supported organization founded in Mandatory Palestine in 1921
- Muslim-Christian Associations (Al-Jam'iah al-Islamiya al-Massihiya)
- Nadi al-Jam'iyya al-Islamiyya, a sports club and football team based in Gaza

== See also ==
- Islamic university (disambiguation)
