= Thing Trunk =

Independent game developer located in Warsaw, Poland

- Company type: Limited partnership
- Industry: Video games
- Founded: 27 September 2012
- Headquarters: Warsaw, Poland
- Products: Return 2 Games (series); Book of Demons
- Members: 7
- Website: https://thingtrunk.com

Thing Trunk is an independent game developer located in Warsaw. The company was established in August 2012 by Maciej Biedrzycki, Konstanty Kalicki and Filip Starzyński, former co-funders of Twin Bottles and Codeminion (known for casual games such as Phantasmat, Ancient Quest of Saqquarah, StoneLoops! of Jurassica).

== History ==
=== Return 2 Games series ===
The company initially focused on defining principles of Return 2 Games - a series of 7 titles aiming to re-capture the feeling and experience of classic games from the '90s. The series were announced three years after creation of the studio (2015). All games in the series will utilize card mechanics and take place in the same setting (called Paperverse) in which characters and objects are made of cut and folded paper. Games from the series are aimed at mid-core gamers. Games are made in CUG (Thing Trunk's in-house engine).

=== Awards and nominations ===
- Indie of the Year Awards 2017 - 10th place, IndieDB
- Momocon 2017 - "Indie Award Finalist", Atlanta
- Casual Connect 2016 - 1st place in Best Game Art, Tel Aviv
- Digital Dragons 2016 - 3rd place in Indie Showcase - Best Indie Game, Kraków
- Freegalaktus 2016 - "Best Game" in Jury's Choice category
- Pixel Heaven 2016 - "Pixel.Award Finalist", Warsaw

== Games ==
- Book of Demons - the game is the first installment of Return 2 Games series. The game was designed as a tribute to the classic isometric hack'n'slashes. Since 2016 the game is available on Steam.
- Hellcard - originally planned to be a new game mode inside the Book of Demons universe, however it was later spun off as a standalone game. It is a cooperative, roguelike deck-builder with singleplayer and multiplayer modes. Fully released for Windows in 2024.
- Book of Aliens - second 'book' (game) in the Return 2 Games series. It is a turn-based strategy game that is also a tribute to UFO: Enemy Unknown.
