= Islamic university (disambiguation) =

Islamic university or Al-Jami'ah al-Islamiyyah (Arabic: الجامعة الإسلامية) is an educational institution.

Islamic university may refer specifically to:

== Bangladesh ==
- Islamic University, Bangladesh at Shantidanga, Kushtia
- International Islamic University, Chittagong
- Islamic University of Technology

== India ==
- Islamic University of Science and Technology, Jammu and Kashmir
- Aligarh Muslim University, Aligarh, Uttar Pradesh
- Jamia Millia Islamia, Delhi
- Jamia Islamia Bhatkal, Bhatkal, Karntaka
- Jamia Islamia Ishaatul Uloom, Nandurbar, Maharashtra
- Jamia Islamia Markazul Uloom, Cuttack, Odisha
- Jamia Islamia Talimuddin, Dabhel, Gujarat

== Indonesia ==
- Bandung Islamic University, West Java
- Islamic University of Indonesia, Special Region of Yogyakarta
- Universities named "State Islamic University" (Indonesian: Universitas Islam Negeri)
  - Alauddin Islamic State University, South Sulawesi
  - Ar-Raniry State Islamic University, Aceh
  - Maulana Malik Ibrahim State Islamic University Malang, East Java
  - Raden Fatah State Islamic University, South Sumatra
  - Sultan Syarif Kasim II State Islamic University, Aceh
  - State Islamic University of North Sumatra, North Sumatra
  - Sunan Ampel State Islamic University Surabaya, East Java
  - Sunan Kalijaga State Islamic University, Special Region of Yogyakarta
  - Syarif Hidayatullah State Islamic University Jakarta, Jakarta

== Saudi Arabia ==
- Islamic University of Madinah at Medina, Saudi Arabia
- Imam Muhammad ibn Saud Islamic University

== Others ==
- Al-Andalusía Islamic University of Spain, Andalusia, Spain
- International Islamic University Malaysia
- Islamic University of Gaza, Gaza Strip
- International Islamic University, Islamabad, Pakistan
- Islamic University College, Iraq
- Omdurman Islamic University, Sudan
- Russian Islamic University
- Islamic University of Applied Sciences Rotterdam, Netherlands
- Mohi-ud-Din Islamic University, Azad Kashmir, Pakistan
- Islamic University in Uganda

== See also ==
- International Islamic University (disambiguation)
- Al-Jam'iyya al-Islamiyya (disambiguation)
- Muslim University (disambiguation)
