= UIB =

UIB may refer to:

== Universities ==
- International University of Batam (Indonesian: Universitas Internasional Batam), Riau Province, Indonesia
- University of the Balearic Islands (Catalan: Universitat de les Illes Balears), Spain
- University of Bergen (Norwegian: Universitetet i Bergen), Norway

== Banks ==
- Union Internationale de Banques, a commercial bank in Tunisia
- United Industrial Bank, now part of Allahabad Bank, Calcutta, India

== Other uses ==
- El Caraño Airport in Quibdó, Colombia (IATA airport code UIB)
- UIB metro station, on the campus of the University of the Balearic Islands
- Updated Irish Braille, 2014 version of Irish Braille
- User is blocked
