= BTV247, Inc =

AffinityTV247, Inc.
- Company type: Private
- Industry: Digital Media
- Founded: Los Angeles, CA USA (2008)
- Headquarters: Offices in Los Angeles, CA, Los Angeles, California, USA
- Key people: Justin Beckett, Chairman & CEO; Cecil Cox, President; Dorika Mamboleo Beckett, Chief Financial Officer; Renee Warren, Executive producer Annmarie Morais, Senior producer, Isaac Díaz, Production Director, Derek Young, Creative director
- Website: www.btv247.com

AffinityTV247, Inc. (Formerly BTV247, Inc.) is a digital media company primarily focused on content derived from or related to Black culture.

AffinityTV247, Inc. (formerly known as BTV247, Inc.) was founded in Los Angeles, California in June 2008 by Justin Beckett and Cecil Cox. The initial seed funding for the venture was provided by VIZX Corporation.

AffinityTV247, Inc. has three operating divisions: BlackTV247.com, BTV Productions and BlackTV247 University.com (further defined below).

== Operations ==
=== Broadcasting ===
AffinityTV247.com is an Internet-based video viewing community which features Black inspired programming. BlackTV247 and its affiliate network offer more than 16 distinct viewing channels and claim to have the largest database of Black related video programs.

=== Production ===
AffinityTV Productions is a digital production company that is primarily responsible for the network's original production activities. Examples of AffinityTV247 original titles include, the Best of BlackTV247.com, BlackTV247 News and The Trial of Huey Newton.

=== Education ===
BlackTV247 University is an Internet-based educational institution which is focused on providing "hands on" Internet-based internships to aspiring media professionals. BlackTV247 University offers unpaid internships in the areas of Writing, Directing, Production and Editing. Internships are customized around student schedules and tuition is free for students who attend a BlackTV247 partnered institution.
