= Cryptologic =

Cryptologic can refer to:

- Cryptography, the study of message secrecy
- CryptoLogic, a provider of online gambling software
