= Mentalup =

Online game platform

MentalUP
- Type: Private
- Industry: Educational technology
- Founded: 2015
- Founder: Emre Özgündüz, Reşit Doğan
- Headquarters: Istanbul, Turkey
- Area served: 27 countries
- Website: www.mentalup.co

MentalUP is an online game platform for children between 6 and 15 years old. It supports children in developing mental as well as attention, memory, problem-solving, logic, visual and verbal skills. The platform contains more than 60 scientific and gamified exercises. Today the application is used by children worldwide. MentalUP was developed by academics, medical consultants, and game designers. It consists personal and corporate modules according to needs of the users. MentalUP provides services through its website, Android App, and also iOS App.

== History ==
MentalUP was founded in 2015 by Emre Özgündüz and Reşit Doğan. In 2016 the company took part in Türk Telekom's acceleration program PILOT. By today the company has reached over 250 thousand users. It is used at more than 200 schools in Turkey, including private school chains such as Doğa Schools and Bahçeşehir College. MentalUP first began to serve in Turkey has expanded over 25 countries within two years.

== See also ==
- Online skill-based game
