= IUR =

IUR may refer to:

- Islamic University of Rotterdam, a vocational university in the Netherlands
- International University of Rabat, a public-contracted private university in Morocco
- Iloilo United Royals, a Filipino professional basketball team
- Inuit Uukturausingit, an Indigenous sign language isolate native to Inuit communities of the Eastern Arctic
