= Skillz (company) =

Online mobile multiplayer video game platform

Skillz Inc.
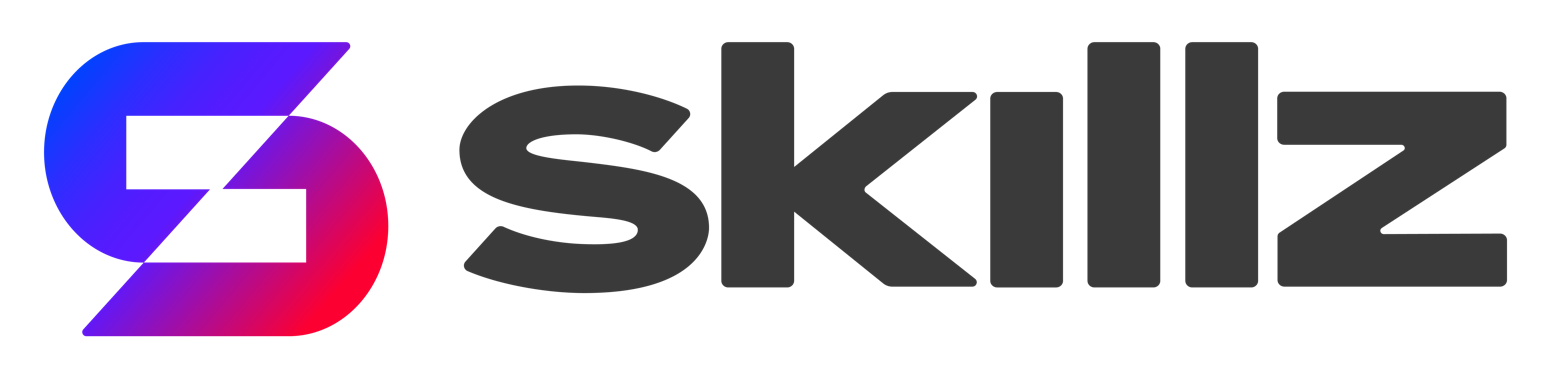
- Type: Subsidiary
- Founded: 2012; 14 years ago
- Founder: Andrew Paradise; Casey Chafkin
- Headquarters: Las Vegas, Nevada, U.S.
- Parent: FIRY Inc.
- Website: http://skillz.com/

Skillz is a mobile multiplayer video game competition platform integrated into online skill-based games. The Skillz platform facilitates players' cash wagers in iOS and Android games. Skillz was founded in 2012 by Andrew Paradise and Casey Chafkin.

Skillz changed its name to FIRY Inc. in 2026, which is headquartered in Las Vegas and has offices in California, Seattle, and Vancouver, Canada. Skillz said it organized over 2 billion esports tournament entries for 30 million mobile players, and distributed over $60 million in prizes each month.

== History ==
Skillz was founded in 2012 by Andrew Paradise and Casey Chafkin in Boston, though the company's headquarters is now located in Las Vegas.

Through different rounds of funding, Skillz has raised $53 million from venture capitalists including Liberty Global, Telstra, Accomplice, Wildcat Capital, as well as the owners of the New England Patriots, Milwaukee Bucks, New York Mets, and Sacramento Kings.

In 2016, the company launched bracketed tournaments on the platform.

In December 2017, Skillz hired its one hundredth full-time employee. As of September 2017, 33% of Skillz's engineering team were women.

In April 2018, Skillz doubled its revenue run-rate to $200 million in nine months, with more than one million tournaments per day. At the same year in September, the revenue rate grew to $400 million.

In 2019, the company held a contest for mobile esports games developers with $25,000-prize for the winner to traffic to the game, with launch and optimization services provided by Skillz business and game design experts.

In 2020, Skillz went public through a merger with Flying Eagle Acquisition Corp., a special purpose acquisition company (SPAC). The merger results in Skillz becoming a publicly traded company listed on the New York Stock Exchange (NYSE) under the ticker symbol "SKLZ". The transaction raised approximately $849 million in gross proceeds, providing additional capital for Skillz's operations and expansion plans. In December 2020, Skillz started trading on the New York Stock Exchange under the ticker “SKLZ” following acquisition company Flying Eagle Acquisition Corp.

In February 2021, Skillz and the NFL partnered to develop a new NFL-themed mobile game.

In August 2021, the company partnered with multiplayer tech company Exit Games with permanent access to the company's technology, and invested $50 million for a minority stake in Exit Games.

In 2021, Skillz generated over $2 billion in gross marketplace volume, over 3 million monthly active users, and hosted an average of over 6 million daily tournaments, including 1.5 million paid entry daily tournaments offering over $100 million in prizes each month.

In February 2024, Skillz was awarded a $42.9 million judgement against rival AviaGames for patent infringement.

== Software ==
The Skillz platform integrates into mobile games to provide esports-related features. Skillz facilitates matching players with one another based on their skill levels. Players can also record or stream their games via the platform. Skillz currently has 30 million users registered on the platform, around 14,000 developer partners. On a daily basis, Skillz runs two million tournaments per day for games such as Solitaire Cube, Bubble Shooter, and Dominoes. Skillz has hosted over 800 million tournaments. Of its users, roughly half are men and half are women.

== Games ==
There are over 800 games of various genres games that have the Skillz multiplayer platform integrated onto them. Tether Studios is one such developer of Skillz games, which uses the Skillz platform to add a cash-rewarded competition element to their Solitaire Cube game, leading to increased player retention. Another game studio on the Skillz platform is Big Run, with games such as Big Cooking and Blackout Bingo.

== Mergers & Acquisitions ==
In August 2020, Skillz and Flying Eagle Acquisition Corp., a publicly traded special purpose acquisition company, merged a business combination that resulted in Skillz becoming a publicly listed company.

In June 2021, Skillz acquired Aarki, a technology-driven marketing platform, for $150 million to create an integrated esports advertising platform. Aarki's demand-side platform was reaching 465 million monthly active users before being acquired by Skillz.

In January 2026, Skillz acquired Beamable, a backend services platform for games.

=== Exit Games ===
In August 2021, Skillz acquired a minority stake in Exit Games for $50 million.

Founded in 2004, Hamburg-based Exit Games created a real-time multiplayer and cloud service called Photon used by developers for creating and hosting real-time multiplayer games. Photon also partners with EA, Square Enix and Ubisoft, and has 24 million users. Photon engine will be used by Skillz to power its platform and esports tournaments.

== Social responsibility ==
In March 2018, Skillz signed a partnership with breast cancer organization Susan G. Komen to host a special charity tournament. During the tournament, Skillz raised over $120,000 for the organization, including participants from 38 states as well as over 60 countries.

In October 2019, the company together with the American Red Cross launched a fundraising tournament to help 200,000 victims of the California wildfires and raised $40,000.

In June 2020, Skillz hosted "Gaming for Good" tournaments to raise money for NAACP Empowerment Programs and used in the charity's mission to get equal rights and put a stop to racism. In July of the same year, the company partnered with Comic Relief US to host fundraising tournaments for Red Nose Day. The raised money was intended to help kids in need affected by the COVID-19 crisis.

In 2022, Skillz and American Cancer Society (ACS) launched a competitive mobile games tournament in support of Coaches vs. Cancer, a partnership between ACS and the National Association of Basketball Coaches. The campaign held for three weeks starting March 20 and spotlighted three former NCAA coaching legends: Jim Calhoun, Bobby Cremins from the College of Charleston, Georgia Tech and Appalachian State, and Lon Kruger.
