= Book of Demons =

2018 video game

- "Book of Demons" cover art
- Developer: Thing Trunk
- Publisher: Thing Trunk
- Producer: Filip Starzyński
- Designer: Filip Starzyński
- Artist: Maciej Biedrzycki
- Writer: Konstanty Kalicki
- Composer: Paweł Błaszczak
- Series: Return 2 Games
- Platforms: Microsoft Windows, iPadOS, Nintendo Switch
- Release: Microsoft Windows; 13 December 2018; Nintendo Switch; 30 April 2020
- Genres: Action role-playing, hack and slash
- Mode: single-player

Book of Demons is an isometric hack and slash action role-playing created by Polish studio Thing Trunk. The game was officially released through Steam on 13 December 2018. The game was originally developed for Microsoft Windows, but the developers informed about plans to release it also on Xbox One. Book of Demons is the first installment of the Return 2 Games series that aims to bring classic hardcore genres to broader audiences. The game features an unusual art style - all elements of the game (starting from the GUI and ending with monsters) are visualised as papercuttings and pop-up book elements, and such style defines visual framework for the whole series. The game also brings some novelties to the genre - the card system which replaces equipment and skills systems typical for the genre, the Flexiscope feature which allows players to control duration of a game session and movement restricted to a path which add a tactical element to the gameplay.

== World and plot ==
The world created in the game relates to the classics of hack and slash genre. The action takes place in the Paperverse, more specifically in the dungeons beneath the cathedral standing in Town. In the depths of the maze under the cathedral, a new evil has awakened and threatens the lives of the locals. Their only hope is the help of a wandering hero, the player's character, who starts the crusade against the Ultimate Evil.

In the dungeons player meets most of the monsters typical for games set in dark fantasy settings - ghosts, spiders, goatmen, demons, skeletons, zombies and gargoyles. Above the ground, in the Town, the player can interact with four citizens - the Sage, the Fortune-Teller, the Barmaid and the Healer, who build the story of the game through rumours. Citizens of the Town also provide various services:

- Sage - identifies cards found by the player and writes the Bestiary.
- Fortune-Teller - upgrades the player's cards, recharges them and fuses Rune cards used for upgrades.
- Barmaid - brews a stew from ingredients found in the dungeons and exchanges it for various prizes.
- Healer - heals the player, brings him back to Town after death and charges the Death Rage skill.

=== Classes ===
In Book of Demons players can choose from three classes, each characterized by a different playstyle and set of class cards.

- Warrior - character specialized in melee combat and defensive skills, relies heavily on Artifact cards.
- Mage - character specialized in ranged attacks and offensive Spell cards, which utilize a mana resource.
- Rogue - character that mixes melee and ranged combat, focused on using Item cards.

=== Card system ===
The card system is a uniquely implemented mechanic in the hack and slash genre. It replaces skills, statistics and equipment. In Book of Demons the player can choose from three types of cards and then build their own hand:

- Items - cards that can be used a limited number of times and which have to be charged by the Fortune-Teller in exchange for gold.
- Spells - skills and spells which require mana to be used.
- Artifacts - cards with passive effects that reduce the amount of mana.

Every card has three variants (common, magic offering one additional effect, and legendary with two additional effects with one unique to that card) and can be upgraded up to two times.

== Development ==
The development of the game started with the establishment of the Thing Trunk studio and initially only the founders of the company (earlier co-funders of Codeminion and Twin Bottles) participated in the project. Book of Demons was meant to be a light and humoristic tribute to classic games from the hack and slash genre made in the '90s. The game is created in CUG - an in-house engine of Thing Trunk's focused mainly on 2D graphics. In the second half of 2016, the project entered Early Access stage and at the end of this year, the developers released a free demo of the game. At the beginning of 2018, the team of developers consisted of 7 employees. The game was officially released on Steam on 13 December 2018. The game was released on Nintendo Switch on 30 April 2020. and on May 21, 2020, in Japan.

== Reception ==
Reception

Aggregate score
Aggregator	Score
Metacritic	PC: 73/100

Review score
Publication	Score
TouchArcade	4.5/5

Critics refer to the game cautiously, refraining from reviews until the release date, however there are some opinions already - Khee Hoon Chan (Unwinnable) commend the game for flexibility in terms of progression and possible play styles, mentioning also that removing the statistics mechanics denies players the opportunity to immerse with their heroes more deeply. GameSpot reviewer, Rafał Kurpiewski (Polygamia.pl) and Szymon Liebert (TVGry) admit that even though the game is heavily inspired on old hack and slash games there is still a lot of originality in it to refresh the genre (citing cards system, restriction of movement and boss mechanics), while noting similarities in stories told in Book of Demons and Diablo games.

Event	Awards and nominations
Digital Dragons 2018	Best Polish Game Art award, Kraków Technology Park
Indie of the Year 2018 - Editors' choice	Best Singleplayer game, IndieDB
Indie of the Year Awards 2017	10th place, IndieDB
Momocon 2017	"Indie Award Finalist", Atlanta
Casual Connect 2016	1st place in Best Game Art, Tel Aviv
Digital Dragons 2016	3rd place in Indie Showcase, Best Indie Game, Cracow
Freegalaktus 2016	"Best Game" in Jury's Choice category
Pixel Heaven 2016	"Pixel.Award Finalist", Warsaw
