= TheV0id =

Poker player

TheV0id is the screen name used by an unnamed poker player who won the PokerStars 2007 World Championship of Online Poker, beating a field of 2998 players to the first place and US$1,378,331.00 on October 1, 2007, the largest online poker prize until then.

The account, registered to Natalie Teltscher, the sister of English poker pro Mark Teltscher, was subsequently disqualified and Kyle "ka$ino" Schroeder was promoted to first place winning the $1,378,330.50.

Micky Doft, writing for PokerNews on 2 September 2010 stated:

Undoubtedly the biggest controversy in WCOOP history, Schroeder's victory in the $2,500 Main Event was not originally his. The tournament was won by Natalie “TheV0id” Teltscher, but it was determined by PokerStars that Mark Teltscher was playing under multiple accounts, including "TheV0id," and was disqualified. The rest of the field moved up one spot in the payouts and Schroeder was awarded the victory.

Natalie Teltscher attempted to regain the funds originally won in this tournament and took Poker Stars to court, but admitted that she did not play the tournament and had an "agent" play on her behalf, which was in violation of the rules.

Subsequently PokerStars released the following statement:

PokerStars™ are pleased to announce that Natalie Teltscher has recently withdrawn her claim in the Isle of Man Courts against PokerStars.
Furthermore, in discontinuing her claim, she has agreed to contribute a sum towards the legal costs incurred by PokerStars in this matter.

The final table lineup consisted of highly successful online players, including professionals Josh Arieh (nitbuster) and Vanessa Rousso (LadyMaverick). Rousso moved up to second place as a result of TheVOid's disqualification, taking a prize of $700,783.

Later on, Teltscher attempted further legal action against the online poker room but ultimately dropped the lawsuit in 2008.
