= Andrew Rivkin =

Canadian investor and entrepreneur (born 1969)

- Born: May 31, 1969 (age 57); Toronto, Ontario, Canada
- Education: University College, University of Toronto, (B.Comm. 1992)
- Occupations: Principal, Rivkin Asset Management; Consultant, Mood Media; Co-founder and past president, FUN Technologies; Co-founder and past CEO, CryptoLogic
- Children: Orrrrrr Rivkin and Lucien Rivkin

Andrew Rivkin (born May 31, 1969) is a Canadian investor and entrepreneur. Rivkin is best known as the co-founder of CryptoLogic, a pioneering online casino software company, and FUN Technologies, one of the world's largest providers of casual games and fantasy sports.

== History ==
Andrew Rivkin was born and raised in Toronto. He graduated from University College, University of Toronto in 1992 with a bachelor of commerce degree in finance and economics.

In 2002, Rivkin co-founded Columbia Exchange Systems Software PLC with Lorne Abony, another collaborator from CryptoLogic with whom Rivkin has worked with on several business ventures.

In 2003, after the two raised C$1.8 million from initial investors, they rebranded the company to FUN Technologies before issuing two initial public offerings in short order, the first on the London Alternative Investment Market in 2003 and the second on the Toronto Stock Exchange in 2004. In particular, Rivkin's past association with CryptoLogic was considered key to the success of the London IPO.

The Meridian, Colorado based Liberty Media acquired a majority interest in FUN Technologies stock in 2005. Liberty Media purchased the rest of FUN Technologies in late 2007. The company was valued at nearly C$500 million at the time of its final sale to Liberty Media.

Since leaving FUN Technologies, Rivkin has served as a consultant for Mood Media, a Toronto-based in-store media company headed by Abony. In 2009 Rivkin founded Rivkin Asset Management, an asset management firm dealing in hedge funds.

In March 2011 Rivkin was involved with Mood Media's acquisition of Muzak Holdings for $345 million.

Rivkin is an avid polo player and participates in several charity polo tournaments in Canada.

== CryptoLogic ==
After founding a network business systems company while still in his teens, Rivkin moved on to co-found CryptoLogic in Toronto in February 1995 with his brother, Mark. Although founded as a general Internet security software company, CryptoLogic soon focused on online gambling, which had become a growth industry since Antigua and Barbuda became the first country to legalize the practice in 1994.

In 1996 InterCasino, the world's first real wager Internet casino, went online using CryptoLogic software. By 1998 CryptoLogic was considered a major player in the emerging online casino industry, with its software used by online casinos in Curaçao and Dominica as well as Antigua and Barbuda. By mid-2000 CryptoLogic software was used by over 500,000 online casino end users worldwide and processed over $4 billion in online transactions.

CryptoLogic was listed on the Toronto Stock Exchange in September 1998 and on the NASDAQ stock exchange in March 2000, both during Rivkin's tenure as CEO. Citing a desire to allow new leadership to take the company to the next level, Rivkin stepped down as CEO of CryptoLogic in January 2001 but remained on the company's board of directors.

In 2002, after Rivkin stepped down as CEO, the Canadian business magazine Profit estimated CryptoLogic experienced a 26,181 percent growth rate over the previous five years, which made it the fastest-growing business in Canada during that period. Also in 2002 CryptoLogic was named the top company in the Profit 200.

== FUN Technologies ==
In 2002, Rivkin co-founded Columbia Exchange Systems Software PLC with Lorne Abony, another collaborator from CryptoLogic with whom Rivkin has worked with on several business ventures. After the two raised C$1.8 million from initial investors, they rebranded to "FUN Technologies."(CB)(PG) The company issued two initial public offerings in short order, on the London Alternative Investment Market in 2003 and the Toronto Stock Exchange in 2004. In particular, Rivkin's past association with CryptoLogic was considered key to the success of the London IPO.

The Meridian, Colorado based Liberty Media acquired a majority interest in FUN Technologies stock in 2005. Liberty Media purchased the rest of FUN Technologies in late 2007. The company was valued at nearly C$500 million at the time of its final sale to Liberty Media.
