= Andrew Paradise =

American entrepreneur and CEO of Skillz

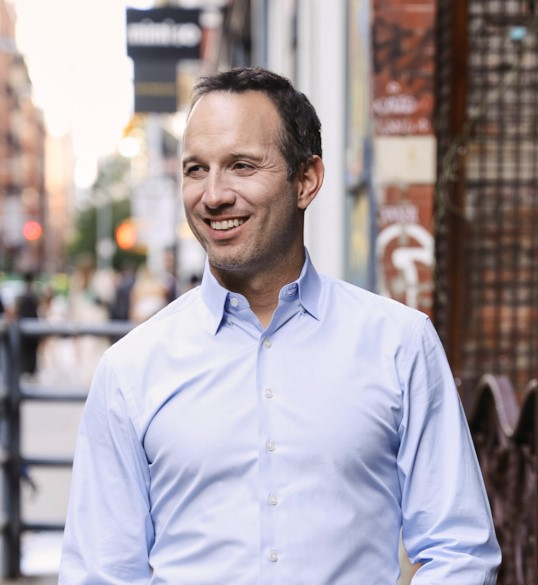
- Organization: FIRY
- Title: Founder

Andrew Paradise (born 10 April 1982) is an American entrepreneur and the founder and CEO of FIRY (NYSE: FIRY), a technology holding company formerly known as Skillz Inc. FIRY comprises three business units: Skillz, a skill-based mobile gaming platform; RZR (Aarki), an AI-powered performance advertising platform; and Beamable, a backend and live operations platform for game developers.

He previously founded AisleBuyer (sold to Intuit) and Double Picture (sold to MPA Inc.). Also, Andrew Paradise was one of the Top-Earning Game CEOs in 2020.

== Early life and education ==
Paradise has said that he learned to program at age 7 by making edits to a video game's configuration file with a hex editor, later writing his first game in Pascal.

He received a Bachelor of Commerce in Economics from the University of Auckland, New Zealand in 2004 and a BA in English Literature, graduating summa cum laude, from the University of Massachusetts Amherst in 2005.

== Career ==
=== Private Equity & Venture Capital ===
Andrew started his career in private equity working for The Watermill Group, a leveraged buyout shop focused on distribution and manufacturing businesses, based out of the Boston area. There he completed his first acquisitions including Latrobe Steel, a company purchased for $215M enterprise value and later sold for $800M. In 2006, he left Watermill to join Fort Washington Capital Partners, working in venture capital investing.

=== Double Picture ===
After spending a few years working for venture capital and private equity firms, Paradise left in 2008 to found his first business, Double Picture, a web 2.0 digital media and advertising company. In 2009, he sold the business to MPA Inc. a publicly traded company.

=== AisleBuyer ===
Paradise founded AisleBuyer in 2009. AisleBuyer a virtual shopping assistant which enabled customers to bypass checkout lines by allowing them to pay for purchases directly through their mobile devices. The software allowed shoppers to scan product bar codes, which subsequently enabled them to read details and customer reviews directly from their smartphones. Shoppers could then purchase the products on the spot, choosing between an in-store purchase or home delivery. Paradise sold the company to Intuit for a reported price of $80 to $100 million in April 2012. The technology was later renamed to Intuit GoPayment.

=== Skillz ===
In 2012, Paradise and fellow AisleBuyer veteran Casey Chafkin founded Skillz under the name Lookout Gaming. Skillz provides an SDK for mobile game developers that allows users to compete against each other. As of October 2018, Skillz reported hosting 2 million tournaments every day. Founders Casey Chafkin and Andrew Paradise are working to democratize the industry by bringing out the best in everyone through competition.

In 2017, Paradise earned No. 1 spot on the Inc 5000 list for Skillz. The company became the first gaming entity ever to top the chart.

In December 2020, Skillz became the first publicly traded mobile eSports platform. Paradise owns 22% of the company.

In 2020, Andrew Paradise took the third place at the Top-Earning Game CEOs who made $103,321,052 (or $51,660 per hour).
