= Muslim University =

Muslim University may refer to:

- Aligarh Muslim University, Aligarh, Uttar Pradesh, India
- Muslim University of Morogoro, Tanzania

== See also ==
- Islamic university (disambiguation)
