= 2014 Austin Aces season =

- Conference: 3rd Western

Record
- 2014 record: 6 wins, 8 losses
- Home record: 3 wins, 4 losses
- Road record: 3 wins, 4 losses
- Games won–lost: 232–290

Team info
- Owner(s): Lorne Abony
- General manager: Kerry Schneider
- Coach: Rick Leach
- Stadium: Cedar Park Center (capacity: 5,226)
- Average attendance: 2,155

The 2014 Austin Aces season was the 12th season of the franchise in World TeamTennis (WTT) and its first in Greater Austin, Texas after relocating from Orange County, California.

The Aces had 6 wins and 8 losses and finished third in the Western Conference. They failed to qualify for the playoffs.

== Season recap ==
=== Relocation to Austin and trade for Roddick ===
On November 21, 2013, WTT announced that entrepreneur Lorne Abony had purchased the Orange County Breakers and relocated them to Austin, Texas renaming the team the Austin Aces. Concurrent with the announcement of the move of the franchise, the Aces announced that they had acquired Andy Roddick in a trade with the Springfield Lasers in exchange for financial consideration. Roddick, a resident of Austin, said, "The fans and team in Springfield were great to me, and I really appreciate their support. Austin, however, is my home, and I am excited to be able to play here in front of my friends and family. I have played Mylan World TeamTennis since I was a teenager, and I believe in the way this league connects with community and provides kids access to professional tennis." Although the WTT press release mentioned that the Aces and Lasers would also swap positions in the Marquee Player Draft (improving the Lasers' draft position), this was not reflected when the league later reported the results of that draft.

=== Lloyd hired as coach ===
On December 30, 2013, the Aces announced they had hired John Lloyd as the team's head coach.

=== Cedar Park Center becomes new home venue ===
On January 8, 2014, the Aces announced that they would play their home matches at the Cedar Park Center in Cedar Park, Texas. The Aces mentioned in the press release that the team considered playing home matches in a climate-controlled, indoor facility as a key factor to its success on the court as well as for the enjoyment of the fans, since Austin often experiences very hot weather during the summer.

=== Drafts ===
With the Breakers having the best record among non-playoff teams at 7 wins and 7 losses in 2013, the Aces had the fourth selection in each round of the Marquee Player Draft. In the first round, the Aces protected Andy Roddick. In the second round, they selected Marion Bartoli. With WTT contracting the Las Vegas Neon, the Aces moved up one spot and had the third selection in each round of the Roster Player Draft. The Aces selected Vera Zvonareva and Eva Hrdinová in the first two rounds and protected Treat Huey in the third round. They passed on making a fourth round selection.

=== Leach replaces Lloyd ===
On July 5, 2014, the Aces announced that John Lloyd would be unable to serve as the team's coach due to a knee injury. Rick Leach was signed to replace Lloyd.

=== Free agent player signings ===
On July 5, 2014, the Aces announced that they had signed 2012 WTT Male Rookie of the Year John-Patrick Smith as a substitute player.

On July 20, 2014, the Aces signed Jesse Witten as a substitute player.

On July 21, 2014, the Aces signed Varvara Lepchenko as a substitute player.

On July 23, 2014, the Aces signed Jason Jung as a substitute player.

=== First match as the Aces ===
On July 7, 2014, the Aces played their first match representing Greater Austin on the road against the San Diego Aviators in what was the first match for that franchise since moving from New York City. Andy Roddick was the first player to take the court representing the Aces but lost the opening set of men's singles. Vera Zvonareva took the second set of women's singles for the Aces. But the Aviators dominated the rest of the match, winning the final three sets on their way to a 23–11 victory.

=== Home opener ===
The Aces played their first home match at Cedar Park Center on July 8, 2014, against the Springfield Lasers. Andy Roddick took the opening set of men's singles. The match was tied at 14 heading to the final set of women's singles which Vera Zvonareva won, 5–3, to give the Aces a 19–17 victory.

=== Losing streak ===
After winning their first two home matches to improve their record to 2 wins and 1 loss, the Aces lost 1o straight sets in their fourth and fifth matches, both at home, in losing to the Washington Kastles, 25–10, and the Philadelphia Freedoms, 25–11. Although the Aces won the opening set of their next match against the Springfield Lasers on the road, they fell to their third consecutive defeat, 21–13, dropping their record to 2 wins and 4 losses.

=== Loss to the Lobsters ===
After defeating the Boston Lobsters at home in the opening match of a home and home series, the Aces lost to them on the road giving Boston its only win all season. Following falling behind 10–0 after the first two sets, the Aces staged a frantic comeback taking the next three sets to cut the Lobsters' lead to 19–15, and send the match to overtime. Eva Hrdinová and Treat Huey won the first three games of overtime in mixed doubles to cut the lead to 19–18, before Megan Moulton-Levy and Rik de Voest broke through for the Lobsters to avoid a super tiebreaker.

=== Playoff push ===
After 11 matches, the Aces found themselves with 4 wins and 7 losses, having lost two straight and six of their previous eight matches. Nevertheless, with three matches remaining, all on the road, they still had an opportunity to reach the playoffs. The Aces got started with a 22–16 victory over their in-state rivals, the Texas Wild. The Aces took four of the five sets in the match. Eva Hrdinová paired with Treat Huey in mixed doubles and with Vera Zvonareva in women's doubles for a couple of set wins. Zvonareva won the women's singles set. Huey teamed with Jesse Witten, who was making his Aces debut, to close out the match with a set win in men's doubles. The win gave the Aces a sweep of their two road matches against the Wild. They lost their only home match against Texas.

The following night, the Aces avenged their home loss against the Philadelphia Freedoms by earning a 21–18 road victory over a team that had dominated them earlier in the season. Varvara Lepchenko won the women's singles set in her Aces debut. Huey teamed with Hrdinová in mixed doubles and Andy Roddick in men's doubles for two set wins. The victory improved the Aces' record to 6 wins and 7 losses and kept them in the playoff race.

On the final day of the regular season, the Aces needed the Boston Lobsters to take a win on the road against the Springfield Lasers to remain in the playoff hunt. The Lasers took care of business, 25–7, to eliminate the Aces. Later that evening, the Aces lost their final match of the season to the San Diego Aviators, 22–12, to finish with 6 wins and 8 losses.

== Event chronology ==
- November 21, 2013: WTT announced that Lorne Abony had purchased the Orange County Breakers and relocated them to Austin, Texas renaming the team the Austin Aces.
- November 21, 2013: The Aces acquired Andy Roddick in a trade with the Springfield Lasers in exchange for financial consideration.
- December 30, 2013: The Aces announced they had hired John Lloyd as the team's head coach.
- January 8, 2014: The Aces announced that they would play their home matches at the Cedar Park Center in Cedar Park, Texas.
- February 11, 2014: The Aces protected Andy Roddick and selected Marion Bartoli in the WTT Marquee Player Draft.
- March 11, 2014: The Aces protected Treat Huey and selected Vera Zvonareva and Eva Hrdinová in the WTT Roster Player Draft.
- July 5, 2014: The Aces announced that John Lloyd would be unable to serve as the team's coach due to a knee injury. Rick Leach was signed to replace Lloyd.
- July 5, 2014: The Aces signed John-Patrick Smith as substitute player.
- July 7, 2014: The franchise lost its first match as the Austin Aces on the road against the San Diego Aviators, 23–11.
- July 8, 2014: The Aces won their first home match at Cedar Park Center against the Springfield Lasers, 19–17.
- July 20, 2014: The Aces signed Jesse Witten as a substitute player.
- July 21, 2014: The Aces signed Varvara Lepchenko as a substitute player.
- July 23, 2014: The Aces signed Jason Jung as a substitute player.
- July 23, 2014: With a record of 6 wins and 7 losses, the Aces were eliminated from playoff contention when the Springfield Lasers defeated the Boston Lobsters, 25–7.

== Draft picks ==
Since the Breakers had the best record among non-playoff teams at 7 wins and 7 losses in 2013, the Aces had the fourth selection in each round of the WTT Marquee Player Draft and moved up to third in the Roster Player Draft after the contraction of the Las Vegas Neon.

=== Marquee player draft ===
The Aces protected Andy Roddick after acquiring him in a trade with the Springfield Lasers. They also drafted Marion Bartoli. The selections made by the Aces are shown in the table below.

Round	No.	Overall	Player chosen	Prot?
1	4	4	Andy Roddick	Y
2	4	12	Marion Bartoli	N

=== Roster player draft ===
The Aces protected Treat Huey making him the only holdover player from the 2013 Orange County Breakers. They also drafted Vera Zvonareva and Eva Hrdinová. The selections made by the Aces are shown in the table below.

Round	No.	Overall	Player chosen	Prot?
1	3	3	Vera Zvonareva	N
2	3	10	Eva Hrdinová	N
3	3	17	Treat Huey	Y
4	3	24	Pass	–

== Match log ==
Legend
Aces Win	Aces Loss
Home team in CAPS

Match	Date	Venue and location	Result and details	Record
1	July 7	Valley View Casino Center; San Diego, California	SAN DIEGO AVIATORS 23, Austin Aces 11 * MS: Somdev Devvarman (Aviators) 5, Andy Roddick (Aces) 2 * WS: Vera Zvonareva (Aces) 5, Daniela Hantuchová (Aviators) 3 * XD: Raven Klaasen/Květa Peschke (Aviators) 5, Andy Roddick/Vera Zvonareva (Aces) 2 *** Vera Zvonareva substituted for Eva Hrdinová at 2–4 * WD: Daniela Hantuchová/Květa Peschke (Aviators) 5, Eva Hrdinová/Vera Zvonareva (Aces) 2 * MD: Somdev Devvarman/Raven Klaasen (Aviators) 5, Andy Roddick/Treat Huey (Aces) 0	0–1
2	July 8	Cedar Park Center; Cedar Park, Texas	AUSTIN ACES 19, Springfield Lasers 17 * MS: Andy Roddick (Aces) 5, Michael Russell (Lasers) 2 * MD: Ross Hutchins/Michael Russell (Lasers) 5, Treat Huey/Andy Roddick (Aces) 2 * XD: Marion Bartoli/Treat Huey (Aces) 5, Olga Govortsova/Ross Hutchins (Lasers) 2 *** Marion Bartoli substituted for Vera Zvonareva at 0–0 * WD: Līga Dekmeijere/Olga Govortsova (Lasers) 5, Marion Bartoli/Vera Zvonareva (Aces) 2 * WS: Vera Zvonareva (Aces) 5, Olga Govortsova (Lasers) 3	1–1
3	July 9	Cedar Park Center; Cedar Park, Texas	AUSTIN ACES 20, San Diego Aviators 18 * MD: Somdev Devvarman/Raven Klaasen (Aviators) 5, Rick Leach/Andy Roddick (Aces) 2; ***Rick Leach substituted for Treat Huey at 2–2 * MS: Andy Roddick (Aces) 5, Somdev Devvarman (Aviators) 3 * XD: Květa Peschke/Raven Klaasen (Aviators) 5, Marion Bartoli/Andy Roddick (Aces) 3 * WD: Marion Bartoli/Vera Zvonareva (Aces) 5, Daniela Hantuchová/Květa Peschke (Aviators) 3 * WS: Vera Zvonareva (Aces) 5, Daniela Hantuchová (Aviators) 2	2–1
4	July 11	Cedar Park Center; Cedar Park, Texas	Washington Kastles 25, AUSTIN ACES 10 * MS: Bobby Reynolds (Kastles) 5, Andy Roddick (Aces) 3 * MD: Leander Paes/Bobby Reynolds (Kastles) 5, Treat Huey/Andy Roddick (Aces) 4 * XD: Martina Hingis/Leander Paes (Kastles) 5, Vera Zvonareva/Treat Huey (Aces) 1 * WD: Martina Hingis/Anastasia Rodionova (Kastles) 5, Eva Hrdinova/Vera Zvonareva (Aces) 1 * WS: Martina Hingis (Kastles) 5, Vera Zvonareva (Aces) 1	2–2
5	July 12	Cedar Park Center; Cedar Park, Texas	Philadelphia Freedoms 25, AUSTIN ACES 11 * MD: Frank Dancevic/Marcelo Melo (Freedoms) 5, Treat Huey/Andy Roddick (Aces) 3 * MS: Frank Dancevic (Freedoms) 5, Andy Roddick (Aces) 3 * XD: Liezel Huber/Marcelo Melo (Freedoms) 5, Marion Bartoli/Treat Huey (Aces) 1 *** Treat Huey substituted for Andy Roddick at 1–0 * WD: Liezel Huber/Taylor Townsend (Freedoms) 5, Eva Hrdinová/Vera Zvonareva (Aces) 2 * WS: Taylor Townsend (Freedoms) 5, Vera Zvonareva (Aces) 2	2–3
6	July 13	Mediacom Stadium at Cooper Tennis Complex; Springfield, Missouri	SPRINGFIELD LASERS 21, Austin Aces 13 * MD: Treat Huey/Andy Roddick (Aces) 5, James Blake/Michael Russell (Lasers) 3 * WS: Olga Govortsova (Lasers) 5, Vera Zvonareva (Aces) 1 * MS: Andy Roddick (Aces) 5, James Blake (Lasers) 3 * WD: Līga Dekmeijere/Olga Govortsova (Lasers) 5, Eva Hrdinová/Vera Zvonareva (Aces) 2 * XD: Olga Govortsova/James Blake (Lasers) 5, Vera Zvonareva/Andy Roddick (Aces) 0	2–4
7	July 14	Cedar Park Center; Cedar Park, Texas	AUSTIN ACES 22, Boston Lobsters 18 * MS: Andy Roddick (Aces) 5, Rik de Voest (Lobsters) 2 * MD: Treat Huey/Andy Roddick (Aces) 5, Eric Butorac/Rik de Voest (Lobsters) 3 * XD: Megan Moulton-Levy/Eric Butorac (Lobsters) 5, Marion Bartoli/Treat Huey (Aces) 3 * WD: Sharon Fichman/Megan Moulton-Levy (Lobsters) 5, Marion Bartoli/Vera Zvonareva (Aces) 4 * WS: Vera Zvonareva (Aces) 5, Sharon Fichman (Lobsters) 3	3–4
8	July 15	Boston Lobsters Tennis Center at the Manchester Athletic Club; Manchester-by-the-Sea, Massachusetts	BOSTON LOBSTERS 20, Austin Aces 18 (overtime) * MS: Rik de Voest (Lobsters) 5, John-Patrick Smith (Aces) 0 * WD: Sharon Fichman/Megan Moulton-Levy (Lobsters) 5, Eva Hrdinová/Vera Zvonareva (Aces) 0 * MD: Treat Huey/John-Patrick Smith (Aces) 5, Eric Butorac/Rik de Voest (Lobsters) 3 * WS: Vera Zvonareva (Aces) 5, Sharon Fichman (Lobsters) 2 * XD: Eva Hrdinová/Treat Huey (Aces) 5, Megan Moulton-Levy/Rik de Voest (Lobsters) 4 *** Rik de Voest substituted for Eric Butorac at 3–2 * OT – XD: Eva Hrdinová/Treat Huey (Aces) 3, Megan Moulton-Levy/Rik de Voest (Lobsters) 1	3–5
9	July 17	Four Seasons Resort and Club Dallas at Las Colinas; Irving, Texas	Austin Aces 23, TEXAS WILD 22 (super tiebreaker, 7–4) * MS: John-Patrick Smith (Aces) 5, Alex Bogomolov, Jr. (Wild) 4 * WD: Eva Hrdinová/Vera Zvonareva (Aces) 5, Darija Jurak/Anabel Medina Garrigues (Wild) 4 * MD: Alex Bogomolov, Jr./Aisam Qureshi (Wild) 5, Treat Huey/John-Patrick Smith (Aces) 2 * WS: Anabel Medina Garrigues (Wild) 5, Vera Zvonareva (Aces) 4 * XD: Eva Hrdinová/Treat Huey (Aces) 5, Anabel Medina Garrigues/Aisam Qureshi (Wild) 4 *** Anabel Medina Garrigues substituted for Darija Jurak at 1–2 * OT – XD: Eva Hrdinová/Treat Huey (Aces) 1, Anabel Medina Garrigues/Aisam Qureshi (Wild) 0 * STB – XD: Eva Hrdinová/Treat Huey (Aces) 7, Anabel Medina Garrigues/Aisam Qureshi (Wild) 4	4–5
10	July 18	Cedar Park Center; Cedar Park, Texas	Texas Wild 23, AUSTIN ACES 12 * MS: Alex Bogomolov, Jr. (Wild) 5, Andy Roddick (Aces) 3 * MD: Treat Huey/Andy Roddick (Aces) 5, Alex Bogomolov, Jr./Aisam Qureshi (Wild) 3 * XD: Anabel Medina Garrigues/Aisam Qureshi (Wild) 5, Marion Bartoli/Treat Huey (Aces) 1 * WD: Darija Jurak/Anabel Medina Garrigues (Wild) 5, Marion Bartoli/Vera Zvonareva (Aces) 2 * WS: Anabel Medina Garrigues (Wild) 5, Vera Zvonareva (Aces) 1	4–6
11	July 19	Cedar Park Center; Cedar Park, Texas	San Diego Aviators 22, AUSTIN ACES 18 * MS: Somdev Devvarman (Aviators) 5, Andy Roddick (Aces) 4 * MD: Somdev Devvarman/Raven Klaasen (Aviators) 5, Treat Huey/Andy Roddick (Aces) 4 * XD: Vera Zvonareva/Treat Huey (Aces) 5, Květa Peschke/Raven Klaasen (Aviators) 2 * WD: Daniela Hantuchová/Květa Peschke (Aviators) 5, Marion Bartoli/Vera Zvonareva (Aces) 2 * WS: Daniela Hantuchová (Aviators) 5, Vera Zvonareva (Aces) 3	4–7
12	July 20	Four Seasons Resort and Club Dallas at Las Colinas; Irving, Texas	Austin Aces 22, TEXAS WILD 16 * XD: Eva Hrdinová/Treat Huey (Aces) 5, Anabel Medina Garrigues/Alex Bogomolov, Jr. (Wild) 3 *** Alex Bogomolov, Jr. substituted for Aisam Qureshi at 3–4 * WD: Eva Hrdinová/Vera Zvonareva (Aces) 5, Darija Jurak/Anabel Medina Garrigues (Wild) 3 * MS: Alex Bogomolov, Jr. (Wild) 5, Jesse Witten (Aces) 2 * WS: Vera Zvonareva (Aces) 5, Anabel Medina Garrigues (Wild) 2 * MD: Treat Huey/Jesse Witten (Aces) 5, Alex Bogomolov, Jr./Aisam Qureshi (Wild) 3	5–7
13	July 21	The Pavilion; Radnor Township, Pennsylvania	Austin Aces 21, PHILADELPHIA FREEDOMS 18 * MS: Frank Dancevic (Freedoms) 5, Andy Roddick (Aces) 4 * WS: Varvara Lepchenko (Aces) 5, Taylor Townsend (Freedoms) 2 * XD: Eva Hrdinová/Treat Huey (Aces) 5, Liezel Huber/Marcelo Melo (Freedoms) 3 * WD: Liezel Huber/Taylor Townsend (Freedoms) 5, Eva Hrdinová/Varvara Lepchenko (Aces) 2 * MD: Treat Huey/Andy Roddick (Aces) 5, Frank Dancevic/Marcelo Melo (Freedoms) 3	6–7
14	July 23	Valley View Casino Center; San Diego, California	SAN DIEGO AVIATORS 22, Austin Aces 12 * MS: Somdev Devvarman (Aviators) 5, Jason Jung (Aces) 0 * WD: Eva Hrdinová/Varvara Lepchenko (Aces) 5, Květa Peschke/Daniela Hantuchová (Aviators) 2 * XD: Bob Bryan/Květa Peschke (Aviators) 5, Treat Huey/Eva Hrdinová (Aces) 2 * WS: Daniela Hantuchová (Aviators) 5, Varvara Lepchenko (Aces) 3 * MD: Bob Bryan/Mike Bryan (Aviators) 5, Jason Jung/Treat Huey (Aces) 2	6–8

== Team personnel ==
=== On-court personnel ===
- (United States) Rick Leach – Player/Head Coach
- (France) Marion Bartoli
- (Czech Republic) Eva Hrdinová
- (Philippines) Treat Huey
- (United States) Jason Jung (Note: Player appeared in fewer than three matches during the season as a substitute player and was not eligible to be protected in the following year's draft.)
- (United States) Varvara Lepchenko
- (United States) Andy Roddick
- (Australia) John-Patrick Smith
- (United States) Jesse Witten
- (Russia) Vera Zvonareva

=== Front office ===
- Lorne Abony – Owner
- Kerry Schneider – General Manager

== Statistics ==
Players are listed in order of their game-winning percentage provided they played in at least 40% of the Aces' games in that event, which is the WTT minimum for qualification for league leaders in individual statistical categories.

Men's singles

Player	GP	GW	GL	PCT	A	DF	BPW	BPP	BP%	3APW	3APP	3AP%
Andy Roddick	79	39	40	.494	16	3	7	19	.368	9	17	.529
John-Patrick Smith	14	5	9	.357	4	2	1	4	.250	2	5	.400
Jesse Witten	7	2	5	.286	2	3	1	2	.500	0	1	.000
Jason Jung	5	0	5	.000	0	0	0	2	.000	0	2	.000
Total	105	46	59	.438	22	8	9	27	.333	11	25	.440

Women's singles

Player	GP	GW	GL	PCT	A	DF	BPW	BPP	BP%	3APW	3APP	3AP%
Vera Zvonareva	87	42	45	.483	3	17	16	33	.485	10	24	.417
Varvara Lepchenko	15	8	7	.533	2	1	3	5	.600	4	5	.800
Total	102	50	52	.490	5	18	19	38	.500	14	29	.483

Men's doubles

Player	GP	GW	GL	PCT	A	DF	BPW	BPP	BP%	3APW	3APP	3AP%
Treat Huey	104	49	55	.471	22	5	9	28	.321	8	24	.333
Andy Roddick	77	35	42	.455	7	3	6	19	.316	5	19	.263
Jesse Witten	8	5	3	.625	0	1	2	3	.667	0	1	.000
John-Patrick Smith	15	7	8	.467	1	0	1	4	.250	1	3	.333
Jason Jung	7	2	5	.286	0	1	0	2	.000	2	3	.667
Rick Leach	3	0	3	.000	1	1	0	0	–	0	2	.000
Total	107	49	58	.458	31	11	9	28	.321	8	26	.308

Women's doubles

Player	GP	GW	GL	PCT	A	DF	BPW	BPP	BP%	3APW	3APP	3AP%
Eva Hrdinová	63	24	39	.381	4	12	5	13	.385	7	16	.438
Vera Zvonareva	87	32	55	.368	1	6	9	24	.375	8	21	.381
Varvara Lepchenko	14	7	7	.500	1	1	1	2	.500	1	2	.500
Marion Bartoli	38	15	23	.395	1	6	5	13	.385	2	7	.286
Total	101	39	62	.386	7	25	10	26	.385	9	23	.391

Mixed doubles

Player	GP	GW	GL	PCT	A	DF	BPW	BPP	BP%	3APW	3APP	3AP%
Eva Hrdinová	53	29	24	.547	2	10	5	15	.333	8	16	.500
Treat Huey	86	42	44	.488	11	6	9	31	.290	11	25	.440
Marion Bartoli	35	13	22	.371	0	7	4	17	.235	5	12	.417
Vera Zvonareva	19	6	13	.316	1	0	1	7	.143	1	6	.167
Andy Roddick	21	6	15	.286	2	1	1	8	.125	3	9	.333
Total	107	48	59	.449	16	24	10	39	.256	14	34	.412

Team totals

Event	GP	GW	GL	PCT	A	DF	BPW	BPP	BP%	3APW	3APP	3AP%
Men's singles	105	46	59	.438	22	8	9	27	.333	11	25	.440
Women's singles	102	50	52	.490	5	18	19	38	.500	14	29	.483
Men's doubles	107	49	58	.458	31	11	9	28	.321	8	26	.308
Women's doubles	101	39	62	.386	7	25	10	26	.385	9	23	.391
Mixed doubles	107	48	59	.449	16	24	10	39	.256	14	34	.412
Total	522	232	290	.444	81	86	57	158	.361	56	137	.409

== Transactions ==
- November 21, 2013: The Aces acquired Andy Roddick in a trade with the Springfield Lasers in exchange for financial consideration.
- December 30, 2013: The Aces announced they had hired John Lloyd as the team's head coach.
- February 11, 2014: The Aces protected Andy Roddick and selected Marion Bartoli in the WTT Marquee Player Draft.
- March 11, 2014: The Aces protected Treat Huey and selected Vera Zvonareva and Eva Hrdinová in the WTT Roster Player Draft.
- March 11, 2014: The Aces left Coco Vandeweghe, Steve Johnson, Maria Elena Camerin and Līga Dekmeijere unprotected in the WTT Roster Player Draft effectively making them free agents.
- July 5, 2014: The Aces announced that John Lloyd would be unable to serve as the team's coach due to a knee injury. Rick Leach was signed to replace Lloyd.
- July 5, 2014: The Aces signed John-Patrick Smith as substitute player.
- July 20, 2014: The Aces signed Jesse Witten as a substitute player.
- July 21, 2014: The Aces signed Varvara Lepchenko as a substitute player.
- July 23, 2014: The Aces signed Jason Jung as a substitute player.

== Individual achievements ==
Eva Hrdinová was fifth in WTT in game-winning percentage in mixed doubles.

== Charitable support ==
During each night of the 2014 season, the WTT team with the most aces received US$1,000 toward a local charity of the team's choice as part of a program called Mylan Aces. In the case of a tie, the award was split accordingly. The Aces earned $5,500 for the Andy Roddick Foundation through the program.
