= StoneLoops! of Jurassica =

2008 video game

- Developer: Codeminion
- Publisher: Game Club Cafe
- Platforms: Microsoft Windows; Mac OS X iOS
- Release: 2008
- Genre: Bubble shooter
- Mode: Single-player

StoneLoops! of Jurassica is a 2D bubble shooter game developed by Codeminion and distributed in 2008 by Game Club Cafe for Microsoft Windows, Mac OS X, and iOS. The game was later removed from the Apple App Store after game developer MumboJumbo filed a complaint with Apple stating that StoneLoops infringed upon their copyrights as the game mimicked the look of and used some of the source code of their game Luxor.

== Gameplay ==
The game has a prehistoric theme and its premise centers around a snail-like creature pushing around a string of colored stone marbles. Players shoot marbles at the loop in order to clear the level and prevent the string from reaching a specific end point, which will cause the player to lose the level. Marbles can be cleared by the player shooting a similarly colored marble at a grouping that contains two or more marbles of the same color. Players will additionally encounter dark silver marbles that cannot be cleared except in specific circumstances. During the gameplay players can collect bonus items that can make the game easier and also remove marbles, including the dark silver marbles. Players can gain these items by playing a bonus level.

The game can be played in three modes, classic, strategy, and survival, and each mode has four difficulty settings, which range from easy to grand master.

== Reception ==
Gamezebo gave StoneLoops! a rating of 4.5/5, praising it for its graphics, sound, and ease of play while also criticizing it for having an unoriginal premise. TouchArcade reviewed the iOS version and also reviewed the game favorably, commenting that its gameplay was addictive.
