= FUN Technologies =

Canadian online game company

FUm Technologies Inc.
- Genre: Online gaming
- Founded: 2002
- Founder: Lorne Abony, Andrew Rivkin
- Fate: Acquired by Liberty Media
- Headquarters: Toronto, Ontario, Canada
- Subsidiaries: WorldWinner

FUN Technologies was an online game company based in Toronto. Founded in 2002 by Canadian businessmen Lorne Abony and Andrew Rivkin, FUN grew to become the world's largest provider of online casual games and fantasy sports, with over 35 million registered customers. FUN was publicly traded with a full listing on the London Stock Exchange in 2003 and Toronto Stock Exchange in 2004. Abony was its chief executive officer when FUN was listed on the TSX, making him the youngest CEO of any company listed on the exchange.

FUN was one of the fastest-growing companies in the history of the Toronto Stock Exchange. In less than three years, the company raised over $160 million in five rounds of equity financings, including its IPO. FUN completed eight strategic acquisitions for a total consideration of $128 million. In March 2006, American media giant Liberty Media acquired FUN in a transaction valuing the company at $484 million.

In September 2006, FUN Technologies held a competition with a $1 million grand prize aiming to find the "world's best casual gamer". The competition had 71 contestants and featured the casual games Bejeweled 2, Solitaire, and Zuma The top prize of $1 million was awarded to a young woman of Odessa, TX named Kavitha Yalavarthi (now Kavitha Shah.) This made her the first esports millionaire and the top female esports earner to date.

SkillJam, founded by Justin Beckett, Michael Raeford, and Mark Elfenbein in 1999 as EGamesGroup before being acquired by Los Angeles based EUniverse on November 8, 2001, was acquired by FUN Technologies in 2004. The SkillJam website used to have online skill-based games, including the exclusive license to Pop Cap's Bejeweled for cash and prizes, sudoku, chess, Zuma, Big Money! and Dynomite!, as well as partnerships with service providers like DirecTV, offering its game tournaments via DirecTV's set-top boxes.

In 2006, FUN acquired its Newton, Massachusetts-based competitor WorldWinner, an established tournament games platform with a large portfolio of games, including Scrabble Cubes, solitaire and Luxor, founded by Alex Bloom (Saidakovsky), Alex Ganelis, and Daniil Utin in 1999. It merged SkillJam into WorldWinner.com in 2007, dropping the SkillJam brand.

In December 2007, Liberty Media acquired FUN Technologies. As a result of the acquisition, WorldWinner began to be integrated with the Liberty-owned Game Show Network, and FUN Technologies was discontinued as a brand.
