= Bubble Shooter =

2002 video game

- Developers: Absolutist LTD (2002 - 2012); Ilyon Dynamics (2012 - )
- Publishers: Absolutist LTD (2002 - 2015); Ilyon Dynamics (2015 - )
- Platforms: iOS, Mac OS, Android, Flash, Palm OS, Pocket PC, Facebook
- Release: 2002
- Genres: Puzzle Bobble 2 clone, puzzle
- Mode: Single-player

Bubble Shooter is a clone of the Puzzle Bobble arcade game that was released by Taito in 1994.

The Bubble Shooter game and IP are owned by Ilyon Dynamics, after they were acquired from Absolutist, who released the original game in 2002. The game was ported to iOS in 2010, and was ported to Android in 2012.

In 2015, Absolutist sold the Bubble Shooter IP to Ilyon Dynamics LTD, which expanded the brand on mobile and into new platforms such as Facebook Messenger and the mobile eSports platform Skillz. A special version was developed and published with the Seminole Tribe of Florida using their Hard Rock Cafe brand.

== Gameplay ==
The goal of the game is to clear the playing field by forming groups of three or more marbles of the same color. The game ends when the balls reach the bottom line of the screen. The more balls destroyed in one shot, the more points scored. A player wins when there are no balls remaining on the playing field.

There are 4 difficulty levels: EasyRide, Novice, Expert, Master. Two scoring modes: Classic, Sniper. The Classic Mode suggests slow-paced gameplay with no time nor shots limits. The goal of the Sniper Mode is to clear the playfield using minimum shots.

There are two game modes:

- Strategy – shots limit
- Arcade – time limit

== Reception ==
Pocket Gamer gave the game a score of four out of ten, saying: "Bubble Shooter is a poorly put together, pale imitation of a far more interesting game."
