= National Autonomous University =

National Autonomous University may refer to:

- National Autonomous University of Honduras, main campus in Tegucigalpa
- National Autonomous University of Mexico, Mexico City
- National Autonomous University of Nicaragua, León and Managua
