= Codeminion =

Polish video game developer based in Warsaw, Poland

Codeminion Games
- Industry: Video games Computer software
- Founded: Poland (2004)
- Defunct: November 11, 2020
- Fate: Closed
- Headquarters: Warsaw, Poland
- Products: Stone Loops! of Jurassica and more...

Codeminion Games was a Polish video game developer based in Warsaw, Poland. Founded in 2004 by Maciej Biedrzycki and Konrad Olesiewicz, who had been working together under the Codeminion name since 2000, Codeminion primarily built downloadable casual games, with Magic Match being their biggest commercial success to date. Magic Match is now the property of Oberon Games and has spawned several sequels.

The studio's early project was Spellscape, an unreleased 3D role-playing game developed in the early 2000s. In 2004, Codeminion released its first commercial title, Pteroglider, a shoot-'em-up game which saw minimal sales. In 2005, the studio released Magic Match, a puzzle game in the match-3 genre, which achieved significant commercial success and introduced a drag-to-select mechanic that was later adopted by other titles in the genre.

Following the success of Magic Match, Codeminion developed several more casual games, including StoneLoops! and Ancient Quest of Saqqarah in 2008. In 2010, the studio released Brunhilda and the Dark Crystal, a hybrid of hidden object and adventure game elements. In 2011, Phantasmat was released and reached the top position on Big Fish Games’ sales charts, marking a high point for the company.

After 2011, the studio reduced its operations and began shifting focus away from casual games. In 2012, Codeminion co-founders became involved in a new game development venture, Thing Trunk, alongside former collaborators. The new studio was created to develop the Return 2 Games series. Codeminion itself remained dormant for several years before officially ceasing operations in 2020.

== Games ==
- Spellscape (2000-2003, cancelled)
- Pteroglider (2004)
- Magic Match (2005)
- StoneLoops! of Jurassica (2008)
- Ancient Quest of Saqqarah (2008)
- Brunhilda and the Dark Crystal (2010)
- Phantasmat (2011)
