= National Technical University =

National Technical University may refer to:

- Belarusian National Technical University
- Donetsk National Technical University
- Ivano-Frankivsk National Technical University of Oil and Gas
- Kazakh National Technical University
- Kharkiv Polytechnical Institute
- National Technical University in Costa Rica
- National Technical University of Athens
- National Technical University of Ukraine
- Vietnam National Technical University
