= Artist Underground =

Artist Underground (formerly known as American Idol Underground) was founded by Justin Beckett in 2006 and was an online community and internet radio station where unsigned artists were able to get their music heard. Artists submit their music to Idol Underground for a fee and receive feedback from listeners. Artists could create fan clubs and have their music played online through various stations. Listeners could rate songs, become members, judge artists, and win prizes. Artists were also eligible to win prizes.

Artists are featured in one of American Idol Underground's genre-specific music areas, which are also places for them to connect with their fans and they get the chance to win cash, equipment and other awards. The website features different music of all ages and genres such as: Rock, Rap, Country, R&B, Electronica, Jazz, Classical, World, Faith-Based and Comedy. The website includes record label executives, recording studios and celebrities such as Verdine White or Kimberly Caldwell who will help artists by giving them critiquing, services and information. Artists get charted, as to see how many spins they are receiving.

The website features frequent contests which divide cash prizes among artists in various genres. The site once reported over 1 million unique visitors each month and featured over 50,000 artists.
