= Safe and Secure Internet Gambling Initiative =

American campaign to legalize online gambling

The Safe and Secure Internet Gambling Initiative promotes an individual's freedom to gamble online in the interest of creating safeguards to protect consumers and ensure financial transactions are legal and safe.

== Background ==
The initiative was founded by a coalition of members who support efforts to legalize internet gambling, which would allow for it to be properly regulated. Such bills have been proposed in the House of Representatives by Rep. Barney Frank (D-MA) and Rep. Jim McDermott (D-WA). Since it was created in 2007, more than 1,200 people have registered their support for the initiative to legalize and regulate online gambling.

In 2013, representative Joe Barton introduced the Poker Freedom Act which prohibited the use of credit cards for internet poker. Safe and Secure Internet Gambling Initiative plead the representative to reconsider the ban on credit cards deposits for consumer protection.
