= Online skill-based game =

Internet game requiring player skill

Online skill-based games are online games in which the outcome of the game is determined by the player's physical skill (like fast reaction or dexterity) or mental skill (logic abilities, strategic thinking, trivia knowledge). As in off-line games of skill, the definition has legal meaning, as playing games of chance for money is an illegal act in several countries.

== Categories ==
Most skill-based games, or skillgames, fall into six categories:

1. Arcade games involve quick fingers and quick thinking. These games are generally sped-up puzzle games.
2. Puzzle games rely on logic abilities and require the user to solve certain types of puzzles. While not as fast-paced as arcade games, these games often come with a time limit.
3. Word games are puzzle games using word problems, like rearranging letters to make words.
4. Trivia games test the user's knowledge of trivia in specific categories or in general.
5. Fantasy sport games rely on the participants ability to assemble the best group of players.
6. Card games are played with playing cards online and requires good use of probability and other mathematical tactics.

== History ==
Around 2000, Disney invested millions in a new online skill-based game company called Skillgames.com (formerly PureSkill.com). Manhattan-based Skillgames, with endorsements by Disney-owned properties such as ESPN and ABC, was to develop skill-based games such as "Hole-In-One Golf," "Soap Opera Trivia" and others implemented as Java applets on their site. Players could win prizes up to a million dollars their first time playing. Skillgames, the brainchild of Walker Digital, also the parent company of Priceline.com, fell on hard times in 2001. Congress had begun to threaten a crack-down on Internet gambling, and although the company was confident of the distinction between games of skill and games of chance, Disney decided to withdraw its investment. Skillgames management announced a business model change in late spring of 2001 and rounds of layoffs followed. After Skillgames was forced by the September 11th attacks to relocate from its offices in Manhattan's Woolworth Building, the company failed to define a new direction, eventually going out of business in November 2001.

The first commercial launches of major skillgame sites in the US occurred in late 2000 when both WorldWinner and SkillJam (previously known as EGamesGroup) released the first versions of their respective online skill game systems.

In 2002 several large US-based portals, including MSN and Yahoo integrated SkillJam's and WorldWinner's services into their game platforms, thereby providing the first major distribution channels for wider skill game adoption.

King, the world’s largest online skills-game site, was launched in 2003. In January 2009, more than 350 million games were played at King, which is available in nine languages. King has featured the skill-game versions of such TV shows as American Idol, The Biggest Loser, Deal or No Deal and 1 vs.100.

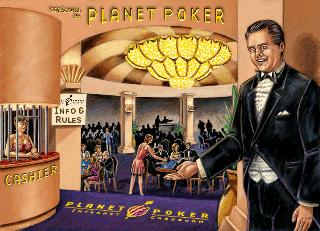
Planet Poker, an online poker site from 2000

Following the success of poker sites, online casinos such as Casino On Net and GoldenPalace.com learned that users want to play against each other instead of the house, and attempted to launch skill-based game sites in 2004 and 2005 with mixed results.

Several efforts have been made to include poker under the definition of game of skill to legalize Internet poker in the US. On May 26, 2007, representative Barney Frank (D-MA) introduced HR 2046, the Internet Gambling Regulation, Consumer Protection, and Enforcement Act, and on June seventh, 2007, representative Jim McDermott (D-WA) introduced H.R. 2607, the Internet Gambling Regulation and Tax Enforcement Act. In 2009, both Frank and McDermott reintroduced modified versions of these bills. In combination, these bills would legalize and regulate online gambling.

In August 2009, Senator Robert Menendez (D-NJ) proposed the Internet Skill Game Licensing and Control Act, suggesting to license and regulate online poker and online skill-based games such as backgammon, bridge and mahjong in the US.

In May 2013, Skillz launched a third party real money gaming platform through a game by Glu Mobile on GooglePlay. Google promptly shut down all real money games later that summer, as it was determined that not all aspects of the games launched were in-line with the company's policies against gambling. Google has yet to re-open real money gaming on GooglePlay.

In August of 2013, Cashplay launched the first real money skill games on Apple’s iOS mobile platform, paving the way for thousands of developers to have a channel to introduce their own real money skill games.

Also in August 2013, Oulala Fantasy Football launched on the premise it was the first fantasy football (or fantasy soccer) game to include an extensive scoring matrix as opposed to the normal 5 to 10 that most other games operate, thus supposedly making it a true skill fantasy football management game.

In October 2015, Kickback launched a service that let users play video games for real money.

Supporters of online skill-based game legalization and regulation include the Safe and Secure Internet Gambling Initiative, which believes "the government should regulate Internet gambling to ensure proper consumer protections are in place."

== Mechanics ==
Like poker sites, many skillgame sites take a rake commission fee from head-to-head and tournament games; however, this oft-ignored practice is de facto illegal in the U.S. Unlike casino games or games of chance, the outcome of a skill game is predominantly determined by the user's skill level. In many U.S. states, the outcome must be determined entirely by the user's skill level.

Successful skill games heavily modify the game play of "regular" casual games such as solitaire or sudoku in order to remove as many random events as possible. The analogy is that the influence of chance in a skill game should not exceed the influence of chance in any other pro sport competition, such as golf or football.
