= International Islamic University (disambiguation) =

The International Islamic University is an Islamic public university in Islamabad, Pakistan.

International Islamic University may also refer to:

- International Islamic University Malaysia, public university in Gombak, Malaysia
- International Islamic University Chittagong, private university in Chittagong, Bangladesh
- International Islamic University of Indonesia, public university in Depok, Indonesia

== See also ==
- Islamic university (disambiguation)
