= American International University =

American International University may refer to:

- American International University-Bangladesh, a university in Dhaka, Bangladesh
- American International University West Africa, a university in the Gambia

== See also ==
- American InterContinental University, an international for-profit university
- American International College, a college in Springfield, Massachusetts
- American International Medical University, a medical school in Saint Lucia
- American University (disambiguation)
- International American University, an for-profit Christian university in California
- International University (disambiguation)
- Pacific Western University (Hawaii), a defunct, unaccredited university in Hawaii also called American PacWest International University
