= Nadi al-Jam'iyya al-Islamiyya =

Palestinian sports club

Nadi al-Jam'iyya al-Islamiyya (in Arabic نادي الجمعية الإسلامية) is a Palestinian sports club and football team based in Gaza, which is affiliated to Hamas.
