= CryptoLogic =

Cryptologic Limited
- Industry: Business Software & Services
- Founded: 1995
- Founder: Andrew Rivkin, Mark Rivkin
- Headquarters: Dublin, Ireland
- Key people: Brian Hadfield
- Parent: Amaya Inc.

Cryptologic Limited was a Dublin, Ireland-based software application service provider (formerly Toronto, Ontario, Canada), one of the oldest established in the online gambling industry. It was acquired by the Amaya Gaming Group in 2012 and has since had its business-to-consumer division, WagerLogic, sold to a third party.

== History ==
CryptoLogic was founded by Canadian brothers Andrew Rivkin and Mark Rivkin in 1995 from the basement of their parents' house. The brothers wanted to find a real life application for a secure online financial transaction system which they had developed.

Through a subsidiary company called WagerLogic, the company handles the licensing of its gaming software, support services and payment processing, ECash.

The company launched their first licensee, InterCasino, in 1996. Since that launch the company has made deals for several other online casino and online poker rooms, including one with William Hill plc, a leading bookmaker in the UK and the first land based operator to go online with a casino. A deal with Littlewoods Gaming led to the gaming software being certified in the Isle of Man in 2002 and Ritz Club certified by the Alderney Gambling Control Commission in 2004.

In January 2004, CryptoLogic Ltd. announced the licensing agreement with Betfair for the launch of an exclusive online poker game.

In addition to the casino and poker products, CryptoLogic also now offers online bingo software. Their casino games can be played in a downloadable and a Java based software version.

CryptoLogic listed on the Toronto Stock Exchange (CRY) in 1998 and on the NASDAQ (CRYP) in 2000. In 2003 the company began trading on the London Stock Exchange (CRP) before achieving gaming software certification in Alderney.

Under Lewis Rose's leadership as President, Chief Executive Officer and Director from 2002–2007, CryptoLogic's market capitalization grew from $90 million to over $400 million.

The Playboy brand launched casino and poker products on Playboygaming.com using CryptoLogic software in early 2007.

World Poker Tour Enterprises (WPTE) also joined the CryptoLogic network in 2007, offering both casino and poker products.

== Takeover by Amaya Gaming Group ==
In April 2012, Cryptologic was acquired by the Amaya Gaming Group in a $35.8 million cash for shares takeover. Amaya subsequently sold Cryptologic's business-to-consumer facing subsidiary, WagerLogic, to Goldstar Acquisitionco Inc in a transaction valued at $70 million in February 2014. This sale included all of Cryptologic's consumer facing online gambling sites including InterCasino, InterPoker, and InterBingo.
