= National Pedagogic University =

National Pedagogic University may refer to:

- National Pedagogic University (Colombia)
- National Pedagogic University (Mexico)
