= Lorne Abony =

Canadian businessman

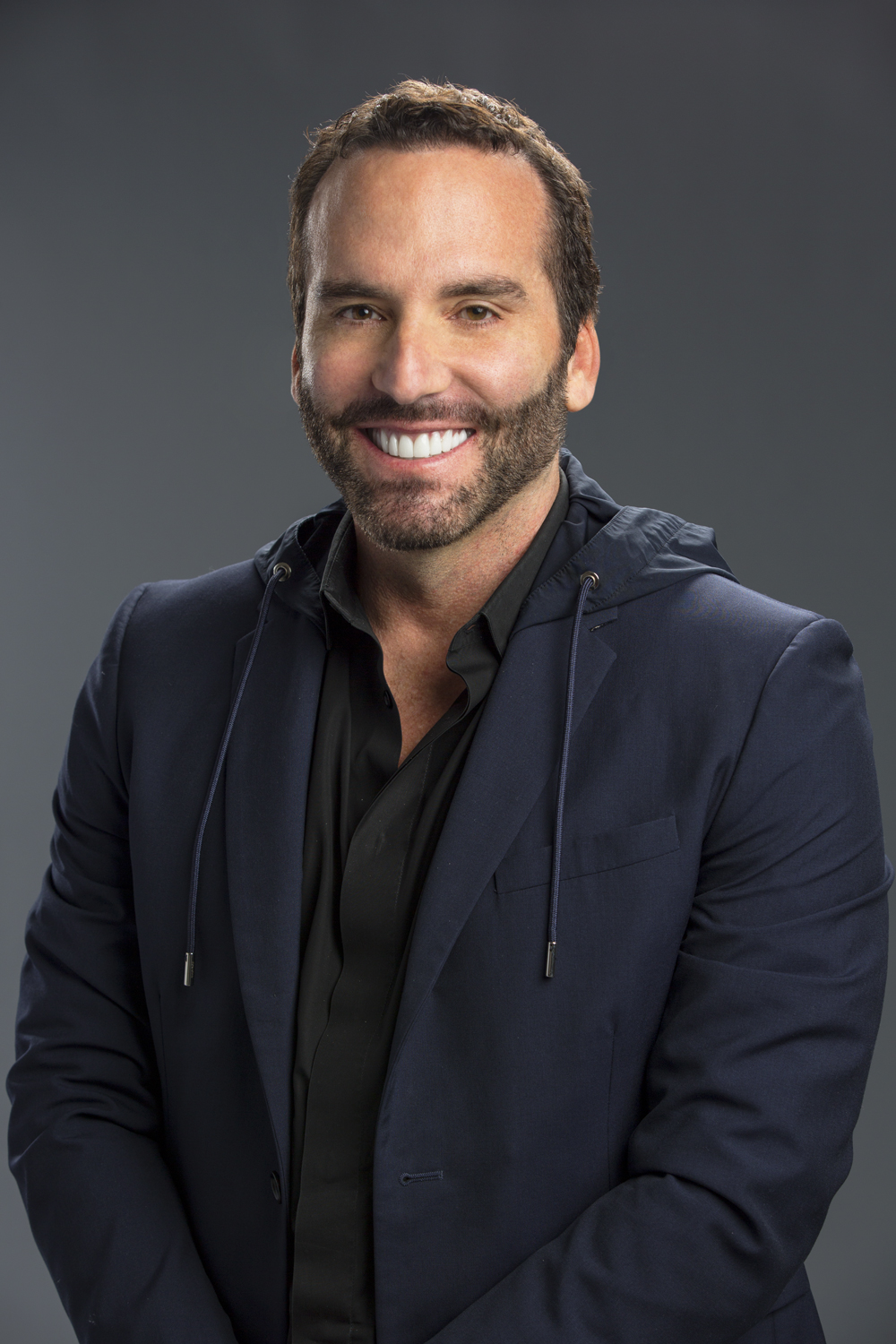
- Born: August 26, 1969 (age 57); Toronto, Ontario, Canada
- Education: McGill University, (BA, 1991), University of Windsor Faculty of Law (JD/LLB, 1994), Columbia Business School, (MBA)

Lorne Abony (born August 26, 1969) is a Canadian businessman, currently the managing partner of Texas Venture Partners, a venture capital company located in Austin, Texas.

== Early life ==
The grandson of Holocaust survivors, Abony was born and raised in Toronto. After graduating from the University of Windsor law school in 1994, Abony practiced corporate and securities law at the Toronto firm Aird & Berlis. Abony earned an MBA from Columbia Business School, an LL.B/J.D. from the International Law Center at the University of Windsor and a B.A. from McGill University.

Abony is the former CEO of Mood Media Corporation, a public company listed on the Toronto Stock Exchange and the London Stock Exchange. He co-founded FUN Technologies in 2001 and in 2004 as CEO of FUN became the youngest CEO of a listed company on the Toronto Stock Exchange (TSX).

== Career ==
=== Petopia.com ===
In January 1998, Abony quit his job as a lawyer and founded online pet-supply business Paw.net in San Francisco. Together with Andrew Reisman, the company raised $300,000 from friends and family, $150,000 from EcomPark, and later, $9 million from TCV. The company, which was eventually renamed Petopia.com, grew to 200 full-time employees within two years and raised over $114 million in financing. Petopia.com was sold to Petco in 2001.

=== FUN Technologies ===
Abony's next venture was Columbia Exchange Systems Software PLC, an Internet gaming company co-founded with Andrew Rivkin after the two raised C$1.8 million from investors. Later renamed FUN Technologies, Abony became the company's CEO and the largest individual shareholder. In 2003, FUN completed an IPO on the London Stock Exchange raising over $11 million. When FUN listed on the Toronto Stock Exchange in 2004, Abony became the youngest person to serve as CEO of a company on the exchange.

Liberty Media acquired a majority interest in FUN Technologies in 2005 and purchased the remainder in late 2007 at a valuation of nearly C$500 million.

=== Orange County Breakers ===
In 2013, Abony purchased the Orange County Breakers of the World Team Tennis professional tennis league and relocated the team to Austin. He sold the team in February 2017.

=== Mood Media ===
Abony is the former CEO of Mood Media Corporation ("Mood Media"). Mood Media provides in-store media to over 575,000 locations worldwide, including clients such as McDonald's, Gucci, H&M, Abercrombie & Fitch, Nike, Hilton Hotel and AT&T. Mood Media has offices in 48 countries employs over 2,700 employees and plays over 115 million songs and 10 million on-hold and on-premise messages daily. In 2011 Mood Media was named Canada's fastest growing company by Profit.

In January 2013, Abony was featured in the CBS series Undercover Boss.

=== Green Dot Duales System Deutschland GmbH (DSD) ===
The Green Dot symbol

Abony was part of the private equity syndicate that acquired Der Grüne Punkt (The Green Dot) "DSD" from Kohlberg Kravis Roberts in 2011. Abony sits on the board of DSD and is one of its largest shareholders. DSD was founded in 1990 and was the first company to introduce a dual take-back system in Germany, in response to the Packaging Ordinance & Waste Act. The Green Dot is the license symbol of a European network of industry-funded systems for recycling the packaging materials of consumer goods. The logo is trademark protected worldwide. DSD employs 247 people in Germany, and is considered the largest dual take-back systems provider in Europe. In 2009, DSD recovered approximately 2.75 million tons of sales packaging, saved 60 billion megajoules of energy and reduced CO_{2} emissions (and its equivalents) by 1.5 million tons. According to Reuters, DSD a former non-profit organization, had 2009 sales of 684 million euros.

=== Nuuvera ===
In November 2017, Abony became the CEO and founder of Nuuvera, a Canadian company that focused on health and wellness products. In March 2018, Aphria Inc. agreed to buy Nuuvera for $826 million CAD in cash and stock. Abony continued working with Aphria to help grow the medical products globally with his international connections.

=== EMMAC ===
Since 2020, Abony has been one of the shareholders of EMMAC, a European independent medical wellness and nutrition company. Abony helped EMMAC become a global leader in life sciences as their Executive Chairman. In 2021, EMMAC was valued in a cash and share deal at approximately $345 million (USD).

=== Other business activities ===
Pluri is an Israeli based leading biotech company that transforms cells into solutions that promote wellbeing and sustainability. In 2023, Abony joined the Board of Directors of Pluri. In 2024, cultivated meat company Meatable named Abony to its board of directors. In the aftermath of the October 7 attacks, Abony co-founded Texas Venture Partners (TVP), which closed its first $50 million venture fund to invest in Israeli defense tech startups on 10 July 2024.

== Philanthropy ==
Abony and his wife Valerie donated $500,000 to The Weiss School in Palm Beach Gardens, Florida. The donations funded the Abony Family Kindergarten Wing, which broke ground in 2012.

The Abonys are listed as founders of the University of Austin, a non-profit private liberal arts university located in Austin, founded in 2021 as an institution "dedicated to the pursuit of truth and open inquiry." The Abonys donated at least $100,000 to the university.

== Personal ==
=== Awards and honors ===
- Ernst & Young Entrepreneur of the Year Award (nominee)
- Financial Post "Bossies" (2011)
- Canada's Top 40 Under 40 (2006)
- University of Windsor's Odyssey award (2006)

=== Tennis ===
Abony was a member of the Team Canada men's tennis team, which competed in the 2009 Maccabiah Games in Israel. He also competes in both the ITF and USTA men's over-40 divisions in both the state and national level in both singles and doubles. Abony's doubles' partner in the men's over-40 category is Jared Palmer, formerly the world #1-ranked doubles player and Wimbledon and Australian Open doubles champion. As of July 3, 2012, Abony, along with tennis partner Jared Palmer, was ranked #2 in the USTA's National Men's over-40 Team Doubles rankings.

In March 2014, Abony and doubles partner Robert Kendrick reached the finals of the USTA National Hardcourt Championships in the men’s over 30 category.

In August 2012, Abony was selected as one of two Players Representatives on a 6-member Competition Committee of the ATP. The committee was composed of members of the international tennis community including former Wimbledon champion Richard Krajicek and was created to "explore new and creative ideas for enhancing the competition and presentation of the sport."

In June 2014, Abony and doubles partner Robert Kendrick won the USTA National Indoor Championship in the men's over 35 category.
