= International University of Batam =

Coordinates: 1.1195431°N 104.0030429°E

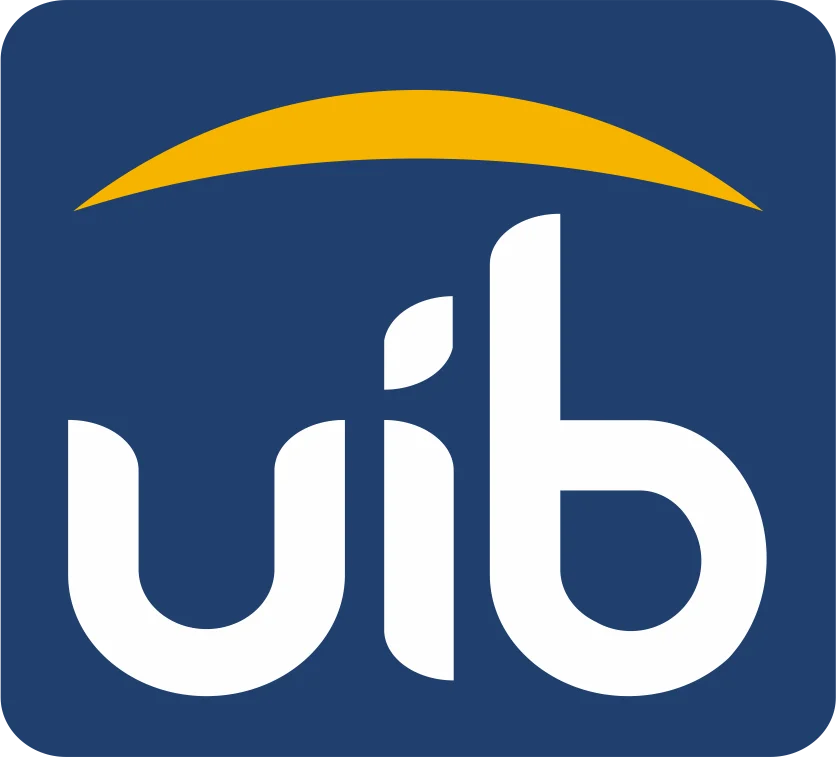
The official logo of Internasional University of Batam

Universitas Internasional Batam (International University of Batam) also commonly known as UIB. is a university located in Batam Island, Riau Islands Province, Indonesia. It was established in the year 2000 in accordance with the Decree of National Education Ministry of Indonesian Republic No. 160/D/O/2000 by Yayasan Marga Tionghoa Indonesia (YMTI), an organization of Tionghoa people in Indonesia.
