= Islamic University of Applied Sciences Rotterdam =

University in South Holland, Netherlands

Coordinates: 51.9352°N 4.4694°E

Islamic University of Rotterdam
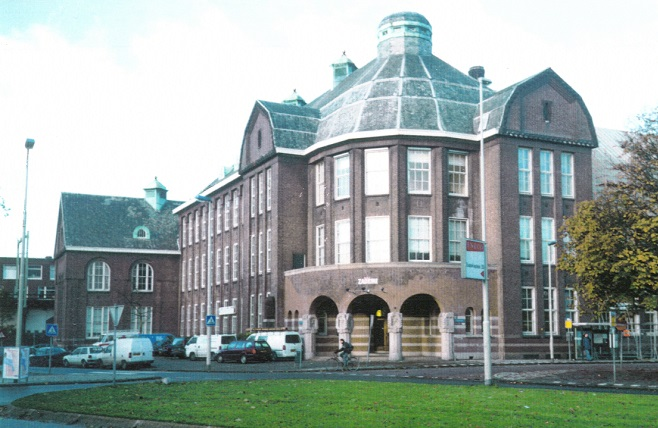
- Type: Islamic university
- Established: 21 November 1997; 28 years ago
- Founder: S.T.K. Damra
- Religious affiliation: Islam
- Rector: Emrullah Akgündüz
- Location: Bergsingel 135, Rotterdam, The Netherlands
- Website: https://www.iuasr.nl/

The Islamic University of Applied Sciences Rotterdam (IUASR) (formerly: Islamic University of Rotterdam-IUR) was founded on 21 November 1997 by the Turkish-Dutch scholar Dr. S.T.K. Damra. He served as the founding rector of the university and led the institution until his departure in 2001. The first chairman of the board was educator and author Hamdi Mert.

== Founding (1997) ==
In 1997, Damra, together with a group of other individuals, founded the Islamic University of Rotterdam (IUR) on 21 November 1997.

== Establishment and early development (1997–2001) ==
Under the leadership of founding rector Dr Damra, the institution took shape and officially commenced with the establishment of the university on 21 November 1997. It lasted until Damra's departure in August 2001. During this time, the university's mission was formulated, the programme structure designed, the academic staff assembled, and the institutional identity developed.

=== The first academic year (1998–1999) ===
Approximately one year after its official establishment on 21 November 1997, the university launched its first educational activities on 14 September 1998, following a period of preparation. In this inaugural year (academic year 1998–1999), more than 200 applications were received.

The opening of the first academic year on 14 September 1998 attracted attention from the Dutch media. Journalists attended the first lectures, conducting interviews with students and lecturers, which resulted in coverage in the press.

=== The transition from temporary facilities to a permanent campus ===
==== First location (1997–1999) ====
The university began its teaching activities here on 14 September 1998. The university's second premises are located at Aelbrechtskade 100, Rotterdam. Present university building is at Bergsingel 135, Rotterdam.

The university's first educational activities took place on the first floor of a large building owned by the Rotterdam Kocatepe Mosqueat the Afrikaanderplein 40. This floor was located in a side wing that was largely unused and situated outside the mosque's active prayer and service areas. The space was rented from the Kocatepe Mosque and made available to the university. Teaching activities continued at this location until the end of 1999.

==== Second location (1999–2002) ====
In its second academic year, the university relocated to a new address within Rotterdam: Aelbrechtskade 100. The third floor of this four-story building was rented and prepared for academic use by founding rector Damra and his fellow board members. Educational activities took place here during the second (1999–2000) and third (2000–2001) academic years.

==== Permanent campus (2003–present) ====
Due to the limitations and challenges associated with temporary premises, Damra and the board began seeking a permanent location for the university. Eventually, an agreement was reached to purchase the current university building for 5,625,000 Dutch guilders (approximately 2.5 million euros). After the departure of Damra and his team in August 2001, the purchase process was finalized by the members of the board. This marked the end of a period of frequent relocations and provided the university with its permanent campus. The monumental building at Bergsingel 135 in Rotterdam offers the space and infrastructure necessary to meet all of the university's spatial and academic needs.

=== Academic programmes ===
The Islamic University of Applied Sciences Rotterdam received her first accreditation in 2010 for her master's degree programme Islamic Spiritual Care (Chaplaincy) and in 2013 for Bachelor program Islamic Theology; both degree programmes are accredited by the NVAO (the official accreditation organisation of the Netherlands and Flanders).

The original logo, designed under Damra, featured at its centre the tughra of Sultan Mehmed. This tughra symbolised continuity with the classical Islamic scholarly tradition. The emblem was encircled by a circular band bearing inscriptions in Turkish, Dutch, and Arabic, highlighting the multilingual and intercultural identity of the university. The round shape symbolised a universal orientation, underscoring that the university was not merely a local theological institution but rather an academic centre with international ambitions.

This visual identity aligned with Damra's vision to position the IUR as a multidisciplinary university, transcending the traditional boundaries of a classical faculty of Islamic theology.

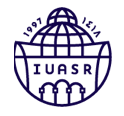
University’s Current Logo

=== Change of the university name ===
After the transition in leadership, the logo featuring the tughra was abandoned, and the name of the university was also revised. The institution's name was changed from Islamitische Universiteit Rotterdam (IUR) to Islamic University of Applied Sciences Rotterdam (IUASR).
