= Justin Beckett =

American businessman (born 1963)

- Born: April 5, 1963 (age 63); Boston, Massachusetts, U.S.
- Education: Duke University (BA)
- Occupation: Business executive
- Employer: LiveWell Assisted Living

Justin Beckett is an American entrepreneur, philanthropist and author.

== Career ==
=== Investment Management ===
After graduating from college in 1985, Justin Beckett joined the Pension Consulting division of investment banking firm E.F. Hutton. In 1986, Justin Beckett became the first employee at Sloan Financial Group, a diversified asset management firm, where he was a principal executive at subsidiaries, NCM Capital Management and New Africa Advisers.

=== Music Gaming, Inc. ===
After leaving the investment management industry in 2000, Beckett founded and was CEO of Music Gaming, Inc. Music Gaming was an Internet based music related gaming destination that built the Internet's largest annotated music trivia database. Funding for the venture was provided by VIZX Corporation and in 2001, Music Gaming, Inc. was sold to Intermix Media/MySpace.

=== SkillJam Technologies ===
In 2002, while a member of the Intermix Media/MySpace executive team, Beckett re-purposed the Music Gaming, Inc software platform and co-founded SkillJam Technologies. SkillJam Technologies received approximately $2 million in growth capital from Intermix Media/MySpace and became the leading skill based gaming website destination. SkillJam developed partnerships with a broad network of popular entertainment brands including AOL, MSN, MySpace, PopCap Games and Disney.

In 2004, Intermix Media/MySpace sold SkillJam Technologies to FUN Technologies, a diversified online gaming and entertainment company which in turn became a subsidiary of Liberty Media in 2006.

=== Fluid Music ===
In 2004, Beckett founded Fluid Music, (since renamed Mood Media) one of the world's largest distributors and aggregators of independent music.

On behalf of Fluid, Beckett facilitated a partnership with FremantleMedia, whereby the company acquired an exclusive license for the American Idol brand and launched the online music discovery website, American Idol Underground. Beckett was also responsible for Fluid Music's acquisitions of Audio Lunchbox, the world's first DRM free online MP3 store and Trusonic, one of the largest providers of in-store background music.

During his first five years with Fluid Music, Beckett served as the company's chairman, chief executive officer, president and COO. Under Beckett's management, the company raised over $40 million in equity capital including a June 2008 IPO on the Toronto Stock Exchange.

=== Engage Play Technologies ===
In 2008, Beckett founded Engage Play Technologies (formerly AffinityTV247, Inc.) with friend and business partner, Cecil Cox and currently serves as the company's chairman and chief executive officer.

Engage Play Technologies is a digital media company.

Engage Play Technologies has three operating divisions: Affinity TV 247, My Local Buzz TV and Loyalty Play Holdings.

=== LiveWell Assisted Living, Inc. ===
Beckett currently serves as LiveWell's chairman and CEO.

== Author ==
In 1996, under the pseudonym Herbert Francis (the first and middle names of his late father), Beckett wrote and produced the television documentary Africa: An Emerging Market which featured Iman, Nigel Hawthorne, Danny Glover and Academy Award Winner Louis Gossett Jr.

== Athletic career/interests ==
Beckett attended Duke University on an athletic scholarship, where he was a member of the Duke Blue Devils football team. He was a 3-year starter, a 4-year varsity letter winner and earned academic All Atlantic Coast Conference honors.

In 1986, he was a free agent with the Dallas Cowboys football team and played in the inaugural American Bowl (against the World Champion Chicago Bears) in the National Football League's first game played outside of the United States.

In recent years, Beckett's athletic interests have been focused on youth activities; during which time he has coached several youth football and basketball teams.
