= InterCasino =

Online casino operator

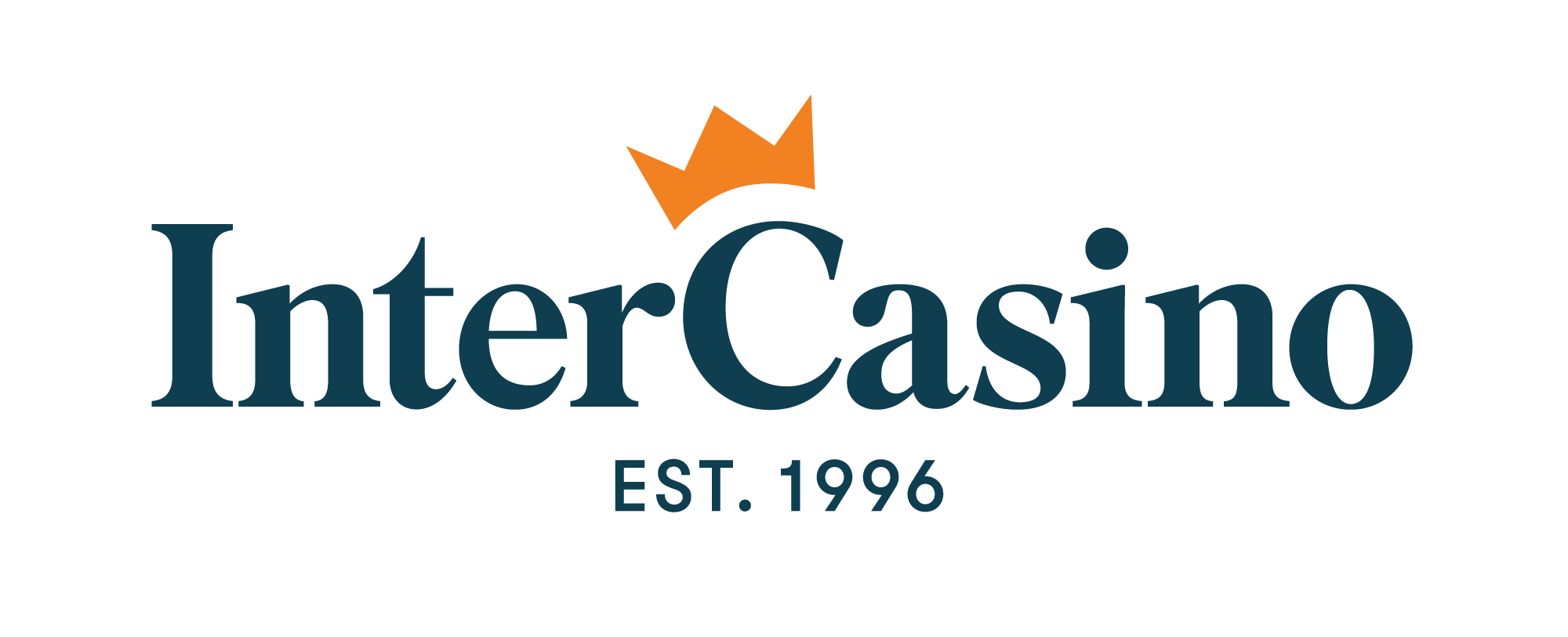
- Industry: Casino
- Founded: 1996; 30 years ago
- Products: Online casino
- Website: www.intercasino.com

InterCasino is the organization credited for establishing the first online casino in 1996 and is part of the InterCasino Group, which is owned and operated by CryptoLogic Operations Ltd, a subsidiary of Goldstar Acquisitionco Inc. Registered in Malta, it is regulated by the Lotteries & Gaming Authority of Malta.

== History ==
Intercasino was created on November 17, 1996. In 1996, InterCasino accepted the first genuine money wager online after the business was initially launched in Antigua by William "Billy" Scott, a former Ohio bookmaker. In 1998, he was charged by prosecutors in the US for illegally taking sports bets online and the business is now in the hands of new owners.

InterCasino's online platforms are powered by WagerLogic software, a division of CryptoLogic.

In 2002, InterCasino launched InterCasinoPoker, a poker room. InterCasino is regulated by Malta The name was later shortened to InterPoker. The following year, Gambling Online magazine voted InterCasino as 'Top Online Casino', an accolade it also won in 2004 (jointly with Omnicasino), 2005 and 2006. In 2007 it came in second place after 888.com took the top spot.

In April 2012, InterCasino's parent company, CryptoLogic, was acquired by the Amaya Gaming Group in a $35.8 million cash-for-shares takeover. In February 2014, Amaya sold CryptoLogic's business-to-consumer subsidiary, WagerLogic, to Goldstar Acquisitionco Inc in a $70 million deal, which included all of CryptoLogic's consumer-facing gambling sites such as InterCasino, InterPoker, and InterBingo.

In 2019, casino operator JPG Group announced that it is to withdraw the InterCasino brand from operating in the UK market.

== Payouts ==
The world's biggest online jackpot was won in December 2005 and won $1,768,518.49 by playing InterCasino's Millionaires Club progressive slots.

Then, the record was broken in May 2007 when a blacksmith with the player name of Obaesso won $8,000,000.

== Regulation ==
Wagers from US players for InterCasino games stopped being accepted in October 2006 due to the Unlawful Internet Gambling Enforcement Act of 2006. This made transactions from banks and similar financial institutions to online gambling websites a crime. As of November 9, 2011, InterCasino's services were not available to residents from the United States, the People's Republic of China, Vietnam, Hong Kong, Macau and Turkey.

In 2008, a series of online casino and poker TV adverts from InterCasino were banned by the United Kingdom's Advertising Standards Authority because they were deemed as using juvenile and slapstick humour that could appeal to young people and children.

InterCasino's parent company at the time, Online Interactive Gaming Entertainment, defended the adverts, describing them as using "gentle slapstick humour reminiscent of old-fashioned routines by Charlie Chaplin or Benny Hill" and, as such, not designed to appeal to children or young persons.
