= Jay Cohen =

Jay Cohen may refer to:

- Jay M. Cohen U.S. Navy admiral
- Jay S. Cohen Co-founder and former CEO of World Sports Exchange
- Jay P. Cohen Appeals court judge in the American state of Florida
