= David Carruthers =

British businessman (born 1957)

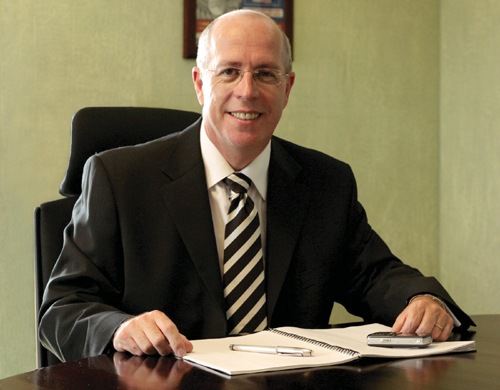
- Born: September 1957 (age 68–69); Edinburgh, Scotland
- Occupation: Businessman
- Website: davidcarruthers.com

David Carruthers (born September 1957 in Edinburgh, Scotland) is a British businessman who was the CEO of online gambling company BETonSPORTS plc from July 2000 until July 2006. He was arrested in the United States on 16 July 2006 on charges related to his role as CEO of the company. He was subsequently convicted of racketeering conspiracy, and sentenced to 33 months in prison.

== Career ==
Born in Edinburgh in Scotland, he attended art college before joining Ladbrokes Plc, the UK's largest retail bookmaker in 1976, where he became the youngest betting shop manager at the age of 19.

During a twenty-four-year career with Ladbrokes, Carruthers graduated with an MBA from the University of Wolverhampton and rose to manage business development strategy for Ladbrokes shops in West England. He managed around forty of the business's then 1,900 high street betting shops, managing the Midlands and south Wales territories.

== BETonSPORTS plc ==
In July 2000, while it was still a privately held company, Carruthers was appointed as CEO of BETonSPORTS, and tasked with bringing the company to a stock market listing.

This he achieved in July 2004 when BETonSPORTS plc successfully listed on the London AIM stock market, and raised £54.6 million (at the time US$101 million).

At the time of the initial listing 48.1% of the company's issued share capital was placed with institutional investors. The offering was underwritten by Evolution Beeson Gregory. It was the third largest IPO fundraising on AIM during 2004.

Carruthers oversaw rapid growth for the company, which more than tripled its operating profits during his tenure. He was appointed to the board of directors on 18 June 2004. BETonSPORTS had a turnover, for the year ended 31 January 2004, of US$1.6 billion. The Group generated a 276% increase in turnover over the period 1999–2004 and profits before tax rose from US$0.6m to approximately US$26m during the same period.

In the fiscal year ending 5 February 2006, the company reported a 65 percent gain in operating profit on continuing operations to $20.1 million. The company said it handled $1.77 billion worth of bets for the year, up 25 percent.

As at 5 February 2005 Carruthers owned 1,185,567 ordinary shares in the company (1.46% of the company based on 81.15 million shares outstanding), and had options for 3 million shares exercisable at £1.40 per share between 15 July 2007 and 15 July 2014.

== Online gambling regulation advocacy ==
Carruthers is a noted and vocal advocate of online gambling regulation. He has frequently engaged in public debate with opponents of online gaming (particularly in the United States), and has argued vociferously for government oversight and taxation of the industry. He has lobbied for regulation on the basis that would help to protect against gambling abuse and underage gambling as well has provide much needed tax revenue to the US government, he sought support from the government in finding ways to protect consumers. Carruthers publicly called for transparency among his industry peers and suggested that a good starting point for operators was a public offering of shares.

Carruthers has accepted numerous speaking engagements in which he has lectured on the benefits of regulation. He has also written magazine articles, newspaper op-eds and a white paper on the topic. But the cornerstone of his lobbying efforts was a grass-roots campaign encouraging American consumers to voice their disapproval of prohibition efforts.

Representative of his arguments for regulation is a 2006 article in The Baltimore Sun by Carruthers:

"Here is the secret that these politicians don't want the public to know about our industry: We want to be regulated. We want to be taxed. We want to be licensed. Instead of dealing with us constructively to address issues of mutual concern, these legislators prefer to pretend that they can control the Internet.
"Instead of protecting the public, they would rather waste time on public posturing to their partisan base, and they would rather waste tax dollars on empty legislative exercises instead of taking ethical actions that would increase revenues to cities, states and the federal government from the taxes we would pay."

In 2004, when leading Internet portals Google and Yahoo! announced they would stop carrying adverts for online casinos, blaming a "lack of clarity" in US regulations, Carruthers told The New York Times:

"I urge these search engines and other service providers to stand up for themselves and challenge these pressure tactics by federal prosecutors."

Carruthers explained to The Wall Street Journal in a 2 August 2004 article: "What happened with alcohol [prohibition] was a disaster," he said. "Nobody wants this business, which is flourishing offshore, being pushed back onto the streets and the back alleys of the U.S." He also argues that "there's a huge missed opportunity here" for the US government to collect revenue.

On 4 April 2006 Carruthers debated Rep. James A. Leach (R-Iowa), on the merits of Rep. Leach's Unlawful Internet Gambling Enforcement Act (H.R. 4411, part of which became part of the Safe Port Act). In response to Rep. Leach's rhetoric, Carruthers presented the case for the regulation of the online gambling industry in the United States.

== Arrest during US transit flight ==
On Sunday 16 July 2006 Carruthers was arrested at Dallas/Fort Worth International Airport in Texas while changing planes. He was travelling with his wife, Carol, from the BETonSPORTS Annual General Meeting in the United Kingdom to his home in Costa Rica where the two lived since 2000.

(At that meeting held on Friday, 14 July, he had publicly announced that the chances of the Unlawful Internet Gambling Enforcement Act of 2006 (H.R. 4411) being passed by the US Senate were "remote".)

On 21 July Carruthers was still jailed in Fort Worth, Texas awaiting a bail hearing concerning federal charges filed in Missouri related to his company taking wagers over the telephone and Internet from US citizens.

While the indictment against the 12 defendants in the case includes 22 counts, Carruthers is only charged with count one, the Racketeer Influenced and Corrupt Organizations Act (RICO) charge. Other charges include 'Mail Fraud', 'Transmission of Wagers/Wagering Information', 'Interstate Transportation of Gambling Paraphernalia', and 'Interference with Administration of Internal Revenue Laws', specifically the evasion of Federal wagering excise taxes.

Coming straight after the controversial extradition of the NatWest Three, to which it has been compared because both cases involve the indictment of non-US persons for actions taken outside the United States, the Carruthers case has attracted much media attention.

Analysts speculated that Carruthers' detention was politically motivated.:

"We will be monitoring this case closely as it is too early to say if this is part of a broader strategy on prevention of Internet gambling in the US or if it is the Department of Justice flexing their muscle and trying to influence legislation," said Greg Harris, an analyst at Cannacord Capital.
"David Carruthers is a prominent advocate of the pro-online gambling industry and the fear that this is an escalation of the anti-lobby will trouble markets," Williams de Broë analyst Nigel Parson said.

== Initial detention hearing ==
At a detention hearing in Fort Worth, Texas on 20 July, David Carruthers waived his right to a bail hearing when he appeared before the Texas court.

Instead, he asked to have the conditions of his release discussed in the jurisdiction of East Missouri, where the charges were filed. The magistrate agreed to the request.

"We are very optimistic that the court in St. Louis can fashion some reasonable conditions for his release," said Carruthers' Texan lawyer, Tim Evans.
"We want to have the detention hearing in the jurisdiction of East Missouri," Evans told the court.
"We order that David Carruthers be detained pending a detention hearing to be held in the prosecuting district," was Judge Charles Bleil's reply.

Outside the courtroom, Evans explained why Carruthers had made the surprise move to shift the hearing to East Missouri. "Yesterday afternoon we determined it would be in our best interests to waive our right to a detention hearing here," he said. "We are very optimistic that the East Missouri court can fashion some optimistic and reasonable conditions for his release."

After his appearance in court, Carruthers returned to the medium-security federal prison in Fort Worth to spend the night. He was expected to make the journey to a jail in St Louis, Missouri by prison bus on Saturday July, 22nd.

== Termination as CEO ==
Carruthers was terminated as BETonSPORTS chief executive officer on 24 July 2006, following his arrest and detention. The company cited Carruthers' inability to perform his daily business duties while jailed as the primary reason for the termination of his contract. It is widely speculated that BETonSPORTS' board made this move to distance itself from the scandal and from questions regarding the criminal background of company founder Gary Kaplan.

The original news item submitted to the London Stock Exchange Regulatory News Service stated that as a consequence Carruthers has also been removed as a director of BETonSPORTS plc.

== Arraignment ==
On Monday 31 July 2006 the defendants in the criminal case were arraigned before US Magistrate Judge for the First Eastern District of Missouri, Mary Ann L. Medler.

Entering not guilty pleas were Neil Kaplan and Lori Kaplan Multz, brother and sister of BETonSPORTS plc. founder Gary Kaplan, along with BETonSPORTS employee Tim Brown; owner of Mobile Promotions Inc. William Lenis; Lenis' daughter and son Monica and William Luis Lennis, and his nephew Manny Lenis, who worked for Mobile Promotions.

An attorney for one of the Florida firms indicted, DME Global Marketing & Fulfillment Inc., entered a not guilty plea, while two other companies did not enter pleas, including BETonSPORTS Plc itself.

Carruthers was supposed to appear in the St. Louis court at the same time as the other defendants, but was still in the process of being transported from Fort Worth, Texas.

A not-guilty plea was entered for him, and it was ruled he would remain in custody until a $1 million (£539,000) bail bond arrangement could be finalised.

Later that day he appeared in front of the court, wearing leg irons, a white T-shirt and loose beige slacks, Carruthers only spoke to confirm his name, age and plea. Speaking outside the court, his lawyer, Tim Evans, said: "Right now, we want to get him out and living in clean sheets and clean clothes."

== Release on bail ==
Carruthers was released on bail the morning of 16 August 2006. His conditions of release included a $1 million (£527,000) bail bond and that he must remain under house arrest in a hotel in Clayton, Missouri, 24 hours a day (only being permitted to leave the hotel for court appearances, meetings with his attorneys or medical emergencies). He also had to wear an electronic tagging device so that his movements may be constantly monitored, and it was required he get a dedicated phone line installed at the hotel.

During the hearing, Carruthers asked the judge only one question: "The house incarceration: is that 24 hours a day?". Judge Medler confirmed it was. Federal officials overseeing Carruthers' bond wouldn't confirm whether he will be forced to stay in his room, or have access to the entire hotel. Carruthers' St. Louis attorney, Scott Rosenblum stated that his client is not a flight risk.

"He's looking forward to responding to these charges in court," Rosenblum said.

== Conviction and imprisonment ==
Carruthers remained on bail under house arrest in a hotel in Missouri for the next three years.

On 2 April 2009, he pleaded guilty to racketeering charges, and agreed to co-operate in the federal investigation and prosecution of BetOnSports founder Gary Kaplan. He withdrew his plea in September 2009, but re-entered it in January 2010 and was sentenced to 33 months in prison.

After serving 14 months he was transferred to complete his sentence in the UK.

== See also ==
- Jay S. Cohen
- Peter Dicks
- NatWest Three
- Neteller
- Nigel Payne
