= Sin tax =

Excise or sales tax specifically levied on goods deemed harmful to society

A sin tax (also known as a sumptuary tax, or vice tax) is an excise tax specifically levied on certain goods and services deemed harmful to society and to individuals, such as alcohol, tobacco, drugs, soft drinks, sugar, fast foods, fat, meat, gambling, vaping, cannabis, and pornography.

In contrast to Pigouvian taxes, which aim to pay for the damage to society caused by harmful products, sin taxes increase the price in an effort to decrease the use of these products. Increasing a sin tax is often more popular than increasing other taxes. However, these taxes have often been criticized for burdening the poor and for disproportionately taxing the physically and mentally dependent.

The World Health Organization names health taxes the taxes on products that have a negative public-health impact (such as tobacco, alcohol and sugar-sweetened beverages). Health taxes reduce consumption of unhealthy products and prevent disease, while advancing health equity and mobilising revenue.

== Summary ==
The enactment of sin taxes on harmful activities varies by jurisdiction. In many cases, sumptuary taxes are implemented to mitigate use of alcohol and tobacco, gambling, and vehicles emitting excessive pollutants. Sumptuary tax on sugar and soft drinks has also been suggested. Some jurisdictions have also levied taxes on recreational drugs such as cannabis where it has been legalized and regulated.

Revenue generated by sin taxes supports many projects imperative in accomplishing social and economic goals. American cities and counties have utilized funds from sin taxes to expand infrastructure, while in Sweden the tax for gambling is used for helping people with gambling problems. Public acceptance of sumptuary taxes may be greater than income tax or sales tax.

== Design ==
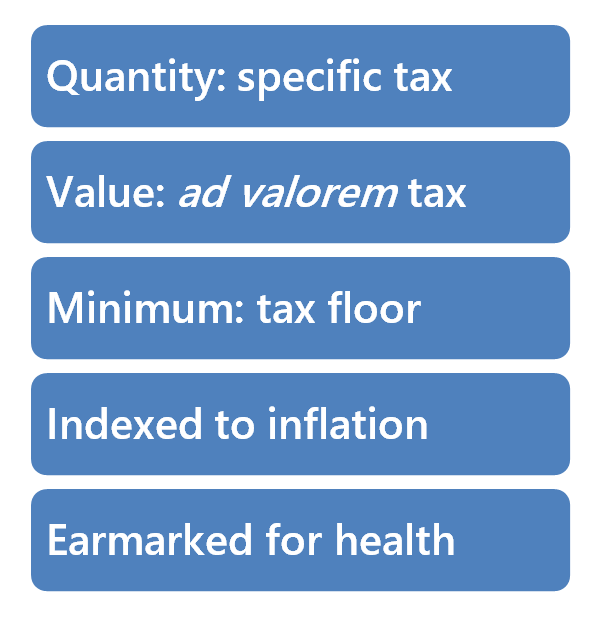
Possible elements of a health tax include: specific tax, ad valorem tax, tax floor or price floor, indexation to inflation and earmarking for health programmes.

Compelling evidence show that health taxes are one of the most effective ways to reduce the consumption of unhealthy products and prevent diseases. Key elements of health taxes include:

- Specific tax (per quantity) and/or ad valorem tax (percentage of value), tax floor or price floor;
- Automatic adjustment to inflation (indexation, not to get more affordable over time);
- Partial or full earmarking of the revenue for related health programmes;
- Comprehensive definition of products included (broad base to avoid loopholes);
- Design according to health goal, for instance taxing the alcohol or sugar content;
- Explicit health rationale in the law, to reinforce the legal and political legitimacy;
- Requirement for monitoring and reporting to recalibrate every 2-3 years.

== Support ==
- Proponents argue that the consumption of tobacco and alcohol, the behaviors associated with consumption, or both consumption and the behaviors of consumption, are immoral or "sinful", hence the label "sin tax". For example, Mayo Clinic anesthesiologists Michael Joyner and David Warner support increasing taxes on tobacco and alcohol, with the goal of using tax codes to help change behavior and improve health.
- Tobacco and alcohol consumption has been linked to a variety of medical problems. In the United States alone, over 440,000 annual deaths are considered to be related to smoking tobacco. A synthesis of 67 studies found that there was evidence indicating tobacco taxation is responsible for "reducing smoking behavior among youth, young adults, and persons of low socioeconomic status, compared to the general population," although no evidence was found indicating this was true for long-term smokers or American Indians.
- Following the medical argument, consumers of tobacco and alcohol cause a greater financial burden on society by forcing others to pay for medical treatment of conditions stemming from such consumption, especially in most first-world countries with government-funded healthcare.
- The moral, medical and financial arguments are occasionally considered in contemporary news settings.

== Opposition ==
- Sin taxes result in the illegal manufacture, smuggling and/or outright theft of the taxed products, sometimes for personal use but often for sale on the black market.
- Critics of sin tax argue that it is a regressive tax in nature and discriminates against the lower classes. Sin taxes are often assessed at a flat rate meaning they account for a much smaller portion of the price of an x by the wealthy. Also, sin tax rates products such as alcohol or cigarettes typically do not account for ability to pay, therefore poor people pay a much greater share of their income as tax.
- Critics also argue sin taxes fail to affect consumers' behaviors in the way that tax proponents suggest, for instance increasing smokers' propensity to smoke cheaper, high-tar, high-nicotine cigarettes when the per-pack tax is raised or smoking marijuana when beer taxes are raised and increasing the rate of people mixing their own drinks rather than buying pre-mixed alcoholic spirits.
- The government may become reliant on the revenue from the tax and have to encourage "sinful" behavior in order to maintain the revenue stream.

== See also ==
Products

- Alcohol tax
- Fat tax
- Meat tax
- Sugary drink tax
- Tobacco taxation

Concepts

- Consumption tax
- Demerit good
- Environmental tax
- Excise
- Müskirat resmi
- Paternalism
- Vacancy tax
- Wagering excise taxes
