= Meat tax =

Tax on animal products

A meat tax is a tax levied on meat and/or other animal products to help cover the health and environmental costs that result from using animals for food. Livestock is known to significantly contribute to global warming, and to negatively impact global nitrogen cycles and biodiversity.

== Nomenclature ==
The term meat tax can be used interchangeably with slaughter tax or carcass tax. The latter also highlights how the tax might be administered - including on the import of frozen carcasses. 'Slaughter tax' and 'carcass tax' are terms that are considered to make such a change in food taxation more popular with the general public.

== Critics ==
=== Support ===
Chatham House and Glasgow University, in a 2015 report titled "Changing Climate, Changing Diets: Pathways to Lower Meat Consumption" called for a tax on red meat.

Adam Briggs from the University of Oxford conducted a study that concluded that putting a carbon tax on "high emission" foods (i.e. foods which have a high carbon footprint) such as meat could be a positive for both the planet and the health of U.K. consumers.

Scientists William J Ripple et al. have suggested the pushing up of the price of meat through a tax or emissions trading scheme.

Marco Springmann, from the Oxford University's Oxford Martin Programme on the Future of Food also proposed a tax on meat and dairy.

Costumed PETA protestors in 2008

Besides environmental concerns, health and humanitarian concerns have also acted as impetus for some proponents of meat tax. PETA has been calling for a tax on meat citing the negative effects of meat consumption on human health, the contribution of meat industry to greenhouse gas emissions and climate change, and the stressful and inhumane conditions under which animals are reared and slaughtered in factory farms.

The Danish Council on Ethics has called for a tax on meat in Denmark.

In 2017, the meat industry's Farm Animal Investment & Return (FAIRR) Initiative reported that meat tax was becoming "increasingly probable".

Swedish Environmental Protection Agency mentions a meat tax as an instrument to achieve a reduction in meat consumption

=== Opposition ===
Some opponents to meat taxation consider it regressive and authoritarian, or doubt some of the health and economic claims, or do not feel it is properly inclusive of total costs over the long term.

== Implementation ==
In June 2024 Denmark, a major pork and dairy exporter, announced that it will introduce a tax on livestock carbon dioxide emissions from 2030, making it the first country to do so and hoping to inspire other countries to follow.

== See also ==
- Carbon tax
- Fat tax
- Sugary drink tax
