= Jay S. Cohen =

American businessman

Jay Scott Cohen
- Born: 1968 (age 56–57); California, United States
- Education: B.S. University of California, Berkeley
- Occupation: Chief Executive Officer

Jay Cohen (born 1968) is the co-founder and former CEO of World Sports Exchange (WSEX), an online gambling company.

== Biography ==
Cohen was raised on Long Island. He is Jewish. He graduated from U.C. Berkeley with a degree in nuclear engineering and married Lisa Yvette Vidal in 1989. He worked as options trader in San Francisco until 1996, when he moved to Antigua and opened the online gambling company World Sports Exchange (WSEX).

In 1998, attorney General Janet Reno charged him with violating the Federal Wire Act. Although Cohen was operating out of a jurisdiction where gambling was legal, his US customers used phone lines and the internet to place bets. On July 24, 2000, Cohen was the first United States citizen to be convicted in US Federal Court for violation of the Federal Wire Act for operating an online gambling company from a jurisdiction where it was legal and regulated (Antigua). He was sentenced to twenty-one months in prison and served his time at Nellis prison camp, 25 miles north of Las Vegas.

Cohen's case was appealed to the United States Supreme Court, but it refused to hear the appeal. He was released in March 2004.

== See also ==
- David Carruthers and Gary Kaplan of BetonSports
- Peter Dicks of Sportingbet
- Howard Lederer, former CEO of Full Tilt Poker
- Neteller
- Nigel Payne
- Safe Port Act
