= Infill =

Rededication of land in an urban environment to new construction

In urban planning, infill, or in-fill, is the rededication of land in an urban environment, usually open-space, to new construction. Infill also applies, within an urban polity, to construction on any undeveloped land that is not on the urban margin. The slightly broader term "land recycling" is sometimes used instead. Infill has been promoted as an economical use of existing infrastructure and a remedy for urban sprawl. Detractors view increased urban density as overloading urban services, including increased traffic congestion and pollution, and decreasing urban green space. Many conservatives also dislike it for social and historical reasons, partly due to its unproven effects and its similarity with gentrification.

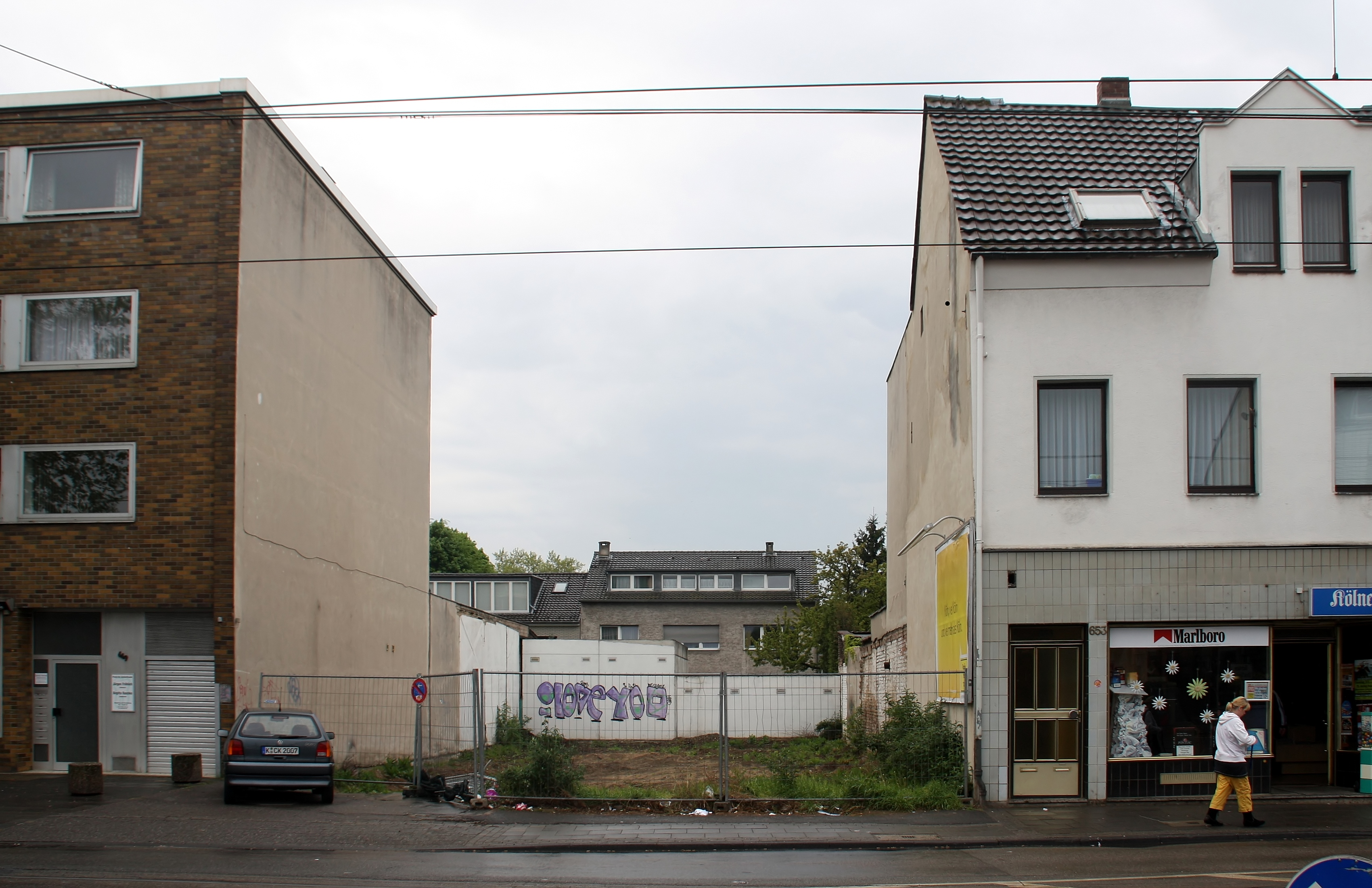
Vacant lot, a potential urban infill site in Cologne, Germany

In the urban planning and development industries, infill has been defined as the use of land within a built-up area for further construction, especially as part of a community redevelopment or growth management program or as part of smart growth.

It focuses on the reuse and repositioning of obsolete or underutilized buildings and sites. Such projects can also be considered as a means of sustainable land development close to a city's urban core.

Redevelopment or land recycling are broad terms which include redevelopment of previously developed land. Infill development more specifically describes buildings that are constructed on vacant or underused property or between existing buildings. Terms describing types of redevelopment that do not involve using vacant land should not be confused with infill development. Infill development is commonly misunderstood to be gentrification, which is a different form of redevelopment.

== Urban infill development vs. gentrification ==
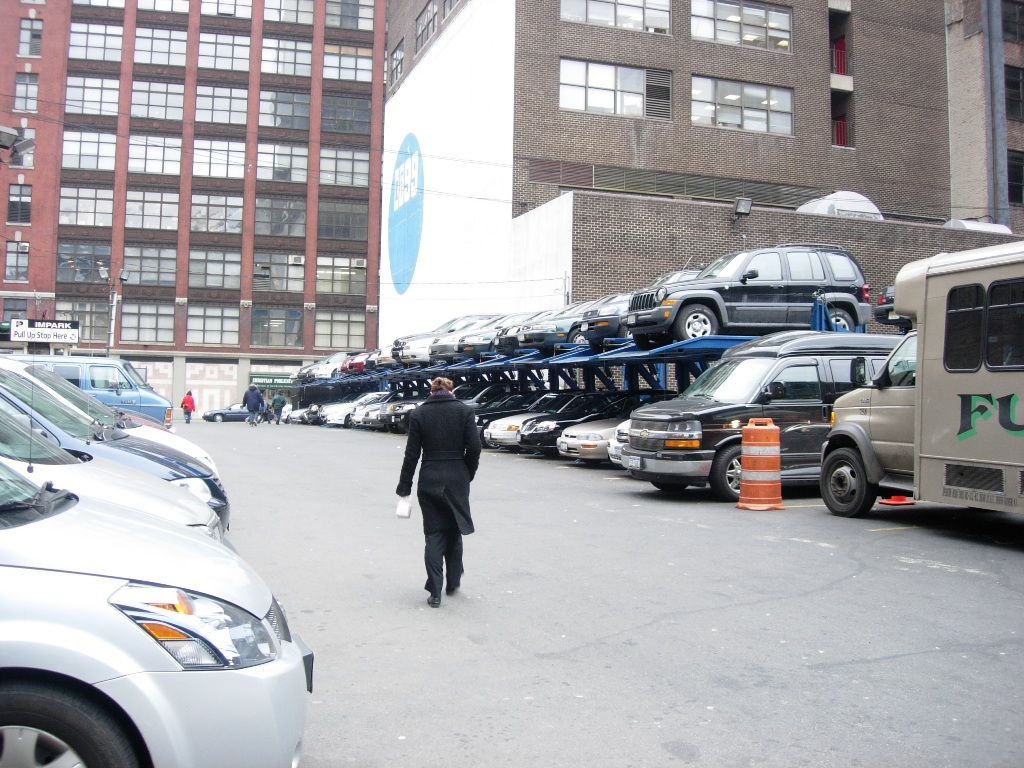
A parking lot in Manhattan adjacent to multi-story buildings. Such vacant lots are often temporary, the old buildings having been demolished for infill development.

Infill development is sometimes a part of gentrification thus providing a source of confusion which may explain social opposition to infill development.

Gentrification is a term that is challenging to define because it manifests differently by location, and describes a process of gradual change in the identity of a neighborhood. Because gentrification represents a gradual change, scholars have struggled to draw a hard line between ordinary, natural changes in a neighborhood and special, unnatural ones based in larger socio-economic and political structures.

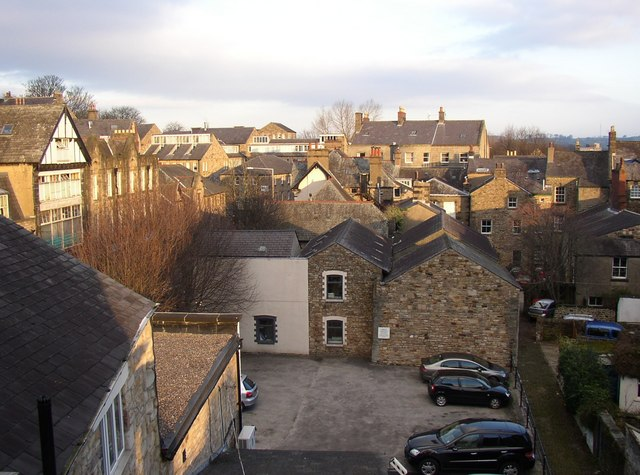
Urban infill, Lancaster, England. The small buildings in the centre stand on a former garden.

While the exact definition of gentrification varies by scholar, most can agree that gentrification redevelops a lower income neighborhood in a way that attracts higher income residents, or caters to their increasing presence. Peter Moskowitz, the author of How to Kill a City, has more specifically put gentrification into context by describing it as a process permitted by "decades of racist housing policy" and perpetuated through a "political system focused more on the creation and expansion of business opportunities than the well-being of its citizens." Gentrification is most common in urban neighborhoods, although it has also been studied in suburban and rural areas.

A defining feature of gentrification is the effect it has on residents. Specifically, gentrification results in the physical displacement of lower class residents by middle or upper class residents. The mechanism by which this displacement most traditionally occurs is through rental increases and increases in property values. As gentrifiers start moving into a neighborhood, developers make upgrades to the neighborhood that are catered to them. The initial influx of middle class gentry occurs due to the affordability of the neighborhood combined with attractive developments that have already been made in the neighborhood. In order to accommodate these new residents, local governments will change zoning codes and give out subsidies to encourage the development of new living spaces. Rental increases are then justified by the new capital and demand for housing coming into an area. Through increased rents for existing shops and rental units, long time residents and shopkeepers are forced to move, making way for the more new development.

The major difference between gentrification and infill development is that infill development does not always involve physical displacement whereas gentrification does. This is because infill development describes any development on unused or blighted land. When successful, infill development creates stable, mixed income communities. Gentrification is more strongly associated with the development of higher-end shopping centers, apartment complexes, and industrial sites. These structures are developed on used land, with the goal of attracting higher income residents to maximize the capital of a certain area. The mixed income communities seen during gentrification are inherently transitional (based on how gentrification is defined), whereas the mixed-income communities caused by infill development are ideally stable.

Despite their differences, similarities between gentrification and infill development are apparent. Infill development can involve the development of the same high-end residential and non-residential structures seen with gentrification (i.e. malls, grocery stores, industrial sites, and apartment complexes) and it often brings middle and upper-class residents into the neighborhoods being developed.

== Social challenges ==
The similarities, and subsequent confusion, between gentrification and infill housing can be identified in John A. Powell’s broader scholarship on regional solutions to urban sprawl and concentrated poverty. This is particularly clear in his article titled Race, poverty, and urban sprawl: Access to opportunities through regional strategies. In this work, he argues that urban civil rights advocates must focus on regional solutions to urban sprawl and concentrated poverty. To make his point, Powell focuses on infill development, explaining that one of the major challenges to it is the lack of advocacy that it receives locally from urban civil rights advocates and community members. He cites that the concern within these groups is that infill development will bring in middle and upper-class residents and cause the eventual displacement of low-income residents. The fact that infill development "is mistakenly perceived as a gentrification process that will displace inner city residents from their existing neighborhoods", demonstrates that there exists confusion between the definitions of the terms.

Powell also acknowledges that there is historical merit to these concerns, citing how during the 1960s infill development proved to favor white residents over minorities and how white-flight to the suburbs occurred throughout the mid-to-late twentieth century. Many opponents to infill development are "inner-city residents of color". They often view "return by whites to the city as an effort to retake the city" that they had previously left. This alludes to the fear of cultural displacement, which has most often been associated with gentrification, but can also apply to infill development. Cultural displacement describes the “changes in the aspects of a neighborhood that have provided long-time residents with a sense of belonging and allowed residents to live their lives in familiar ways.” Due white flight throughout the mid-to-late 20th century, minorities began to constitute the dominant group in inner-city communities. In the decades following, they developed distinct cultural identities and power within these communities. Powell suggests that it is unsurprising that they would want to risk relinquishing this sense of belonging to an influx of upper class white people, especially considering the historical tensions leading up to white flight in urban areas across the country throughout the mid to late 20th century.

== Benefits of infill development ==
Despite these concerns, Powell claims that, depending on the city, the benefits of infill development may outweigh the risks that such groups are concerned about. For example, poor cities with high levels of vacant land (such as Detroit) have much to gain through infill development. He also addresses the concern that minority groups will lose power in these communities by explaining how "cities like Detroit and Cleveland are far from being at risk of political domination by whites."

The ways that Powell believes infill development could help poor cities like Detroit and Cleveland are through the increase in middle class residents and the new buildings that are constructed in the neighborhoods. These new buildings are an attractive alternative to blight, so they can have the benefit of improving property values for lower-class homeowners. While increases property values can sometimes force non-homeowners to relocate, Powell suggests that in poor cities there are enough options for relocation that the displacement often remains "intra-jurisdictional". Another benefit of infill development is the raising of the tax base, which brings more revenue into the city and improves the city’s ability to serve its residents. Infill development's ability to eradicate old industrial sites and city-wide blight also can improve the quality of life for residents and spark much-needed outside investment in cities.

Considering the confusion between gentrification and infill development, a major obstacle for advocates of infill development is to educate community members on the differences between infill development and gentrification. Doing so requires explaining that infill projects use vacant land and do not displace lower income residents, but instead benefit them in the creation of stable, mixed-income communities. Addressing the issue of cultural displacement is also paramount, as infill development still has the potential to shift the cultural identity of a neighborhood even if there is no physical displacement associated with it.

== Logistical challenges ==
Although urban infill is an appealing tool for community redevelopment and growth management, it is often far more costly for developers to develop land within the city than it is to develop on the periphery, in suburban greenfield land. Costs for developers include acquiring land, removing existing structures, and testing for and cleaning up any environmental contamination.

Scholars have argued that infill development is more financially feasible for development when it occurs on a large plot of land, with several acres. Large-scale development benefits from what economists call economies of scale and reduces the surrounding negative influences of neighborhood blight, crime, or poor schools. However, large scale infill development is often difficult in a blighted neighborhood for several reasons, such as the difficulties in acquiring land and in gaining community support.

Amassing land is one challenge that infill development poses, but greenfield development does not. Neighborhoods that are targets for infill often have parcels of blighted land scattered among places of residence. Developers must be persistent to amass land parcel by parcel and often find resistance from landowners in the target area. One way to approach that problem is for city management to use eminent domain to claim land. However, that is often unpopular with city management and neighborhood residents. Developers must also deal with regulatory barriers, visit numerous government offices for permitting, interact with a city management that is frequently unwilling to use eminent domain to remove current residents, and generally engage in public-private partnerships with local government.

Developers also meet with high social goal barriers in which the local officials and residents are not interested in the same type of development. Although citizen involvement has been found to facilitate the development of brownfield land, residents in blighted neighborhoods often want to convert vacant lots to parks or recreational facilities, but external actors seek to build apartment complexes, commercial shopping centers, or industrial sites.

== Suburban infill ==
Suburban infill is the development of land in existing suburban areas that was left vacant during the development of the suburb. It is one of the tenets of New Urbanism and smart growth, trends that urge densification to reduce the need for automobiles, encourage walking, and save energy ultimately. In New Urbanism, an exception to infill is the practice of urban agriculture in which land in the urban or suburban area is retained to grow food for local consumption.

=== Infill housing ===
Infill housing is the insertion of additional housing units into an already-approved subdivision or neighborhood. They can be provided as additional units built on the same lot, by dividing existing homes into multiple units, or by creating new residential lots by further subdivision or lot line adjustments. Units may also be built on vacant lots.

Infill residential development does not require the subdivision of greenfield land, natural areas, or prime agricultural land, but it usually reduces green space. In some cases of residential infill, existing infrastructure may need expansion to provide enough utilities and other services: increased electrical and water usage, additional sewage, increased traffic control, and increased fire damage potential.

As with other new construction, structures built as infill may clash architecturally with older, existing buildings.

== See also ==
- Land recycling
- Redevelopment
- Urban consolidation
- Gentrification
- Urban sprawl
- Vacancy tax
- Land value tax
