= List of Gambit Esports CS:GO tournament results =

The following is a list of achievements of esports organization Gambit in Counter Strike: Global Offensive (CS:GO). The team was active from 2016 until April 2022, Gambit sold its roster to Cloud9 following bans from various event organizers due to the 2022 Russian invasion of Ukraine.

== Achievements ==
Bold denotes a CS:GO Major
Italics denote a CS:GO Minor / RMR events

=== 2016 ===
- 1st – CIS Minor Championship – Columbus 2016
- 9–12th – **MLG Major Championship: Columbus**
- 5–8th – **ESL One Cologne 2016**
- 11–14th – ELEAGUE Season 1
- 1st – Adrenaline Cyber League
- 1st – Acer Predator Masters Season 3
- 1st – DreamHack Open Winter 2016

=== 2017 ===
- 5–8th – **ELEAGUE Major 2017**
- 5–8th – DreamHack Masters Las Vegas 2017
- 2nd – cs_summit Spring 2017
- 1st – DreamHack Open Austin 2017
- 1st – **PGL Major: Kraków 2017**
- 3rd–4th – DreamHack Masters Malmö 2017
- 7–8th – EPICENTER 2017
- 5–6th – Intel Extreme Masters XII – Oakland
- 3rd–4th – DreamHack Open Winter 2017
- 1st – Asus ROG Masters 2017 Grand Finals

=== 2018 ===
- 9–11th – **ELEAGUE Major: Boston 2018**
- 9–12th – Intel Extreme Masters XII – World Championship
- 3rd–4th – DreamHack Masters Marseille 2018
- 3rd–4th – DreamHack Open Tours 2018
- 3rd–4th – Adrenaline Cyber League 2018
- 3rd–4th – DreamHack Open Summer 2018
- 13–16th – ESL One: Cologne 2018
- 3rd–4th – Intel Extreme Masters XIII – Shanghai
- 20th–22nd – **FACEIT Major: London 2018**
- 3rd–4th – ESL One: New York 2018

=== 2019 ===
- 4th – CIS Minor Championship – Katowice 2019

=== 2020 ===
- 5th – Intel Extreme Masters XV – New York Online: CIS
- 1st – Nine to Five #6
- 1st – DreamHack Open November 2020
- 5–8th – DreamHack Masters Winter 2020: Europe
- 3rd–4th – DreamHack Open December 2020
- 1st – Nine to Five #7

=== 2021 ===
- 3rd–4th – DreamHack Open January 2021: Europe
- 2nd – Snow Sweet Snow #1
- 1st – Intel Extreme Masters XV – World Championship
- 1st – Pinnacle Cup
- 2nd – ESL Pro League Season 13
- 2nd – DreamHack Masters Spring 2021
- 1st – EPIC CIS League Spring 2021
- 1st – Intel Extreme Masters XVI – Summer
- 1st – BLAST Premier: Spring Finals 2021
- 2nd – StarLadder CIS RMR 2021
- 5–6th – Intel Extreme Masters Cologne 2021
- 5–8th – ESL Pro League Season 14
- 2nd – Intel Grand Slam Season 3
- 1st – Intel Extreme Masters XVI Fall: CIS
- 3rd–4th – **PGL Major Stockholm 2021**
- 1st – V4 Future Sports Festival 2021
- 5–6th – Intel Extreme Masters XVI – Winter
- 2nd – BLAST Premier: World Final 2021

=== 2022 ===
- 1st – Funspark ULTI 2021
- 5–6th – Intel Extreme Masters XVI – Katowice
