= Gary Kaplan =

Founder of BetonSports.com

- Born: January 5, 1959 (age 67)
- Occupation: Businessman
- Known for: Founder of BetonSports.com
- Spouse: Holly Hoeffner
- Children: 2

Gary Kaplan (born January 5, 1959, in New York) is the founder of BetonSports.com (BoS), an online sports betting company which took in wagers amounting to nearly $4 billion from 2002 and 2004, 98 percent of which came from the United States. In 2004, BoS went public on the London Stock Exchange.

== Early life and career ==
Kaplan was raised in Brooklyn, New York, and dropped out of high school. He is of Jewish descent. In 1993, after he moved from New York to South Florida, he noticed how bookies would fly to the Caribbean where gambling was legal to place bets for American bettors.

Soon after, he founded his own sportsbook doing the same. In 1995, he moved to San José, Costa Rica where he met Norm "Stormin' Norman" Steinberg, operator of the Millennium Sportsbook. A consummate gambler, Steinberg lost heavily and settled his obligations to Kaplan, giving up his extensive customer list.

Instead of relying on word-of-mouth to obtain customers, the norm in the industry, Kaplan implemented an extensive marketing campaign, buying full-page ads in mainstream publications including Maxim magazine and Pro Football Weekly, advertising on sports radio such as The Jim Rome Show, leasing billboards, and sending out promotional mail. He created hundreds of websites, as gamblers were often superstitious and would avoid returning to a site where they had lost money. The business was so successful that his sister, Lori Kaplan Multz, and brother, Neil Kaplan, soon joined him in Costa Rica.

BoS booked $1.09 billion in bets in 2001, increasing to $1.23 billion in 2002 and $1.24 billion in 2003. In 2000, he hired British citizen David Carruthers as CEO. After initially failing to float the company on the London Stock Exchange, they succeeded in July 2004.

On July 17, 2006, the United States Attorney for the United States District Court for the Eastern District of Missouri cited the Federal Wire Act of 1961, issuing a 22-count indictment for Kaplan and eight others, including Carruthers. Charges included violations of the Racketeer Influenced and Corrupt Organizations Act, interstate transportation of gambling paraphernalia, tax evasion, and interference with IRS laws. Nine months later, Kaplan was arrested in the Dominican Republic and transferred to U.S. custody by Interpol.

Kaplan retained attorneys Alan Dershowitz, Chris Flood, and Dick DeGuerin. In April 2009, Carruthers reached a plea bargain and agreed to testify against Kaplan and others.

In August 2009, Kaplan also reached a plea deal. He was sentenced to four years in prison.

== Personal life ==
Kaplan is married to Holly Hoeffner and they have two children.

== See also ==
- David Carruthers
- Jay S. Cohen
- Peter Dicks
- Neteller
- Nigel Payne
- Safe Port Act
