= WSEX =

WSEX may refer to:

- WXHD, a radio station (98.1 FM) licensed to serve Santa Isabel, Puerto Rico, which held the call sign WSEX from 2013 to 2016
- WCPY, a radio station (92.7 FM) licensed to serve Arlington Heights, Illinois, United States, which held the call sign WSEX from 1983 to 1989
- World Sports Exchange
