= Pinnacle Sports =

Online gambling website

Pinnacle
- Type: Private
- Industry: Online gaming
- Founded: 1998
- Headquarters: Curaçao
- Products: Sportsbook, Casino
- Revenue: $34.1 Million (2023)
- Website: www.pinnacle.com

Pinnacle (formerly known as Pinnacle Sports) is an online gaming website that was founded in 1998. Since its inception, Pinnacle has become a medium-sized, fully licensed, online sportsbook. Pinnacle Sports rebranded to Pinnacle on June 1, 2016 after acquiring the pinnacle.com domain name.

Presently, the company has customers in over 100 countries and is available in 19 (including international English) different languages. While most of the company information, including number of employees and gross revenues are kept private, Michael Konik, author of The Smart Money, believes "it would not be out of line to guess that their [Pinnacle Sports] annual handle is in the billions of dollars."

Pinnacle headquarters are located on the island of Curaçao of the Kingdom of the Netherlands, and the group is fully licensed and regulated by the Government of the Netherlands Antilles (license number: 8048/JAZ2013-013), which also functions as the regulating body for the gaming industry. On March 19, 2015 Pinnacle announced the award of a Class II Remote Maltese Gaming Licence, MGA/CL2/1069/2015 for the provision of sports betting.

Regulation requires that Pinnacle must maintain sufficient funds to be able to honour the winnings of their customers at all times.

== Reduced margin pricing ==
When Pinnacle began trading in 1998, most gaming companies used bonuses to lure potential customers. Rather than offer sign up or reload bonuses, Pinnacle became the first sportsbook to introduce a reduced margin pricing model or reduced juice, thus deriving profit from lower margins but a far higher turnover. Pinnacle began offering -105/-104 ($1.95-$1.96) prices on head-to-head match odds and spreads, significantly undercutting the standard -110 ($1.91) pricing model that was used by its competitors.

Pinnacle is able to operate under this pricing model by posting opening 'overnight' lines with smaller limits. This allows Pinnacle to shape their lines according to the betting activity of 'sharp' bettors without exposing the book. These early, low limit bets ultimately allow Pinnacle to offer betting limits with confidence as high as $50,000 or more on selected games with their low margin pricing model.

== Casino ==
Although Pinnacle is best known for its sports betting service, they have also operated an online casino since September 2004 and offer the following games in cash, high-stakes cash and free play formats:

- Blackjack
- Baccarat
- Craps
- Roulette
- Pontoon
- Video poker
- Pai gow poker
- Stud poker
- Oasis poker
- Hold'em poker
- Three card stud poker
- Single and multi-line slots
- Progressive slots
- Keno

== Poker ==
In August 2008, Pinnacle entered the online poker realm, in hopes of taking advantage of the online poker phenomenon. Pinnacle's poker room was run and operated by Entraction software. The same poker network is used by other online gaming websites, such as Betdaq, I4Poker and Redbet.

In June 2011, Entraction informed Pinnacle that due to changes in EU gaming regulation their Curaçao license was no longer accepted. Pinnacle closed their poker room on 13 June 2011 stating "the steps required to remain within the Entraction Network will necessitate a significant commitment for Pinnacle Poker. Given that our current focus is on developing our leading Sportsbook and Casino products, we have decided not to pursue the necessary changes."

== eSports ==
In 2010, Pinnacle was one of the first global bookmakers to offer odds on eSports. What began initially as an experiment quickly turned into a major market which has doubled in size for four consecutive years (2010 to 2014). According to Pinnacle, eSports is now the 7th largest market for them in terms of volume, exceeding regular sports like golf and rugby. Pinnacle reached the milestone of a total of one million eSport bets in December 2014, and five million in February 2017. In the rank of money volume wagered, in 2018 the eSports has become the fourth most popular sport and could clinch number two in a few years.

In August 2021, Pinnacle announced a sponsorship deal of the Esports CS:GO events Home sweet Home and Malta Vibes Ultimate Knockout. The events took place during March and August 2021 and included top team names within the CS:GO Esports community.

== Drone racing ==
In 2016 Pinnacle was the first bookmaker to offer odds on drone racing. On October 5 Pinnacle announced:

Starting with the 2016 Drone Racing World Championships first event at the Kualoa Ranch in Hawaii (October 20–22) Pinnacle will initially offer odds on the outright winner to gauge interest in the market.

== Exit from US market ==
On January 11, 2007, in what was considered a controversial move, Pinnacle voluntarily announced that it would no longer accept wagers from customers based in the United States in accordance with the Unlawful Internet Gambling Enforcement Act of 2006, which was passed on September 30, 2006. The law, which was a last minute addition to Security and Accountability For Every Port Act, stipulates that "participants in designated payment systems to establish policies and procedures reasonably designed to identify and block or otherwise prevent or prohibit transactions in connection with unlawful Internet gambling." At the time, Pinnacle Sports posted the following message to their U.S. based customers:

After careful consideration, Pinnacle Sports has chosen to voluntarily exit the U.S. market. Accordingly, wagers will no longer be accepted from clients within the U.S. as of Thursday, January 11, 2007.

At the time of the announcement, nearly 60-65% of Pinnacle's customers were based in the United States. Passage of the legislation led Pinnacle to have problems with transactions involving US banks. Shortly after the decision, an executive at Pinnacle was quoted as saying: "When the U.S. focuses on something and says 'Enough,' and when they go to war, no individual company can possibly win in a fight of this nature." The executive also reportedly said that "since the Internet Gambling Bill went into effect, we have lost the ability to do business with many quality banks."'

After the decision, Pinnacle teamed up with World Sports Exchange (WSEX) to offer their US based customers an alternative to their website. At customer's requests, Pinnacle willingly transferred all money left in US based accounts to new accounts at WSEX.

On December 19, 2008, Pinnacle ceased offering odds on North American horse racing. Although no official reason was given, it is believed this decision was made due to ongoing pressure from the U.S. government, as well as a general decline in interest from their non US based customers.

== Exit from Swedish market ==
On October 1, 2026, it was reported that Pinnacle had begun winding down its operations in the Swedish market. The company stopped accepting new customer registrations, deposits and bets through Pinnacle.se, while existing customers remained able to access their accounts and withdraw funds. Pinnacle stated that further information would be communicated to customers by email. At the time, no date for a complete closure of Pinnacle.se had been announced.
