= Müskirat resmi =

Ottoman empire tax on alcohol

Müskirat resmi was a tax on alcohol in the Ottoman Empire.

Strictly speaking, the Islamic law forbade alcohol, so there were no alcohol taxes in the early empire. However, the Ottoman Empire acquired increasingly large non-Muslim populations, and inherited the taxes and customs of conquered territories; so in the seventeenth century an alcohol tax for non-Muslims was inaugurated. There were, subsequently, complex changes to taxation of alcohol (and in some cases taxes were abolished or replaced with something else, only to be re-established later); but these different taxes were generally all known as müskirat resmi. Tax farming usually allowed tax collection to be done by a non-Muslim contractor, to avoid the need for a Muslim civil servant to be directly involved in the alcohol trade.

There was also a zecriye resmi – a tax on "prohibited goods" – applied to alcohol sold in markets in the eighteenth century.

Müskirat resmi persisted in the tanzimat era; the Ministry of Finance established a separate department (zecriye emaneti) to collect revenues from alcohol taxation. Tax reforms simplified the rate at 20%, and imported alcohol was subject to another müskirat charge (instead of customs), which ranged from 10% to 12%. In 1861, the general müskirat tax was reduced from 20% to 10% – but alcohol sellers were required to pay for additional permits (ruhsatname; the cost was a proportion of their rent). Shortly afterwards, the rate increased to 15%. Towards the very end of the empire, further tax changes favoured beer production over wine or rakı.

Only in 1926, were alcoholic drinks made legal for Muslims (in what was, by then, Turkey); manufacturing and distribution continued under government monopoly.

Christian priests and monks were generally exempt from müskirat resmi on alcoholic drinks for their own personal use, and also for masses.

== See also ==
- Alcohol law
  - Alcohol laws of Turkey
- Alcohol tax
- Prohibition of intoxicants in Islamic law
- Sin tax
