= Y. Claire Wang =

Academic

- Education: National Taiwan University, Harvard School of Public Health
- Scientific career
- Fields: Epidemiology, Obesity prevention
- Workplaces: Columbia University Mailman School of Public Health

Y. Claire Wang is an associate professor at Columbia University's Mailman School of Public Health. Her research focuses on obesity prevention strategies and techniques, such as soda taxes, and how effective they may be in reducing the economic costs of obesity.

== Research ==
Wang's research focuses on trends in consumption of unhealthy foods, as well as energy balance, and the role of both these factors in the etiology of chronic diseases such as obesity and diabetes. Some of her research has concluded that the New York City soft drink size limit would primarily target overweight and obese children and young adults, as well as that children need to reduce their daily calorie intake by 64 calories in order to achieve federal goals for reducing obesity rates Another study authored by Wang concluded that the number of obese adults in 2030 is anticipated to be about 65 million higher than it was in 2011 when this study was published. When these predictions appeared in the Lancet, Wang and her coauthors wrote that "we hope that our dire predictions will serve to mobilise efforts to reduce obesity so that our predictions do not become reality."

=== Sugar-sweetened beverages ===
Wang presented a report to the New York City Department of Health and Mental Hygiene in 2010, which concluded that a penny-per-ounce tax on sugar-sweetened beverages "could potentially prevent ~37,400 diabetes cases within the next decade, saving approximately $1.2 billion dollars in medical costs." In addition, one of her studies argued that such a tax on SSBs would raise about $1 billion per year. She also helped develop the Caloric Calculator, with the support of the Robert Wood Johnson Foundation, which calculates the public health impacts of various obesity prevention strategies, including physical education programs and the decreased use of time by watching TV or playing video games. In January 2012, Wang and her colleagues published a study concluding that a penny-per-ounce soda tax would prevent about 2,600 deaths per year. This study was widely reported on in the media.
