= Vacancy tax =

Tax based on property vacancy

A vacancy tax is a type of excise, or use tax, on properties, either commercial or residential, that are unoccupied or vacant, for a specified amount of time.

Jurisdictions may choose to implement vacancy taxes as a means to incentivize property usage, increase housing supply in areas with high residential vacancy rates, disincentivize real estate speculation, and to incentivize landlords to lower rents sufficiently to fill empty commercial or residential properties.

Depending on the jurisdiction and specific implementation, these taxes may apply to any combination of seasonal "vacation" homes, empty investment properties, unoccupied rental units, or commercial properties. Commercial taxes are generally rarer than residential taxes.

== Discussion ==
The Wall Street Journal interviewed housing experts who felt that taxes on vacant and underused could have modest positive effects on returning housing to productive use and raising revenue, but was limited in what it could achieve since there typically is not that much vacant or underused housing.

== United States ==
Vacancy taxes have existed in the United States since at least 2018.

=== Washington D.C. ===
Washington, D.C. assesses an annual tax on commercial or residential properties that amounts to 5% of the assessed property value on vacant properties or a 10% annual tax on the value of blighted properties since 2018.

=== Rhode Island ===
Starting July 1, 2026, vacation homes in Rhode Island (those used less than 183 days per year) will face an additional property tax on the value of their homes above $1 million. Funding is earmarked for low-income housing tax credits.

=== California ===
==== Oakland, CA ====
The City of Oakland, California started assessing an annual tax of $3,000 per condo and $6,000 per parcel on vacant property after a 2018 ballot measure passed with 70% voter approval. A property is considered "vacant" if it is "in use less than fifty (50) days in a calendar year," and not subject to any of ten (10) exemptions. The tax is unusual in that it is a flat tax and not a percentage of the property's value, so it brings it less revenue than in other cities with a vacancy tax. As of 2026, most parcels paying the tax are concentrated primarily on undeveloped land in wealthier and hillier neighborhoods where development is more challenging though that figure counts a 50-unit building the same as a small empty parcel.

==== Berkeley, CA ====
Starting in 2024, the City of Berkeley, California began assessing an annual tax of $3,000 on residential units occupied less than 183 days per year and increasing to $6,000 for the subsequent year and $12,000 for the year after that. Berkeley's vacancy tax, Measure M, was passed in 2022 with 65% voter approval. Some owners have been withholding taxes to see if the San Francisco measure was struck down in court.

==== San Francisco, CA ====
Voters in San Francisco, California approved both a commercial and a residential vacancy tax in separate referendums in the 2020s, though the residential tax has been ruled to be preempted by state law.

San Francisco's Commercial Vacancy Tax (CVT) is a tax on keeping certain commercial spaces vacant for more than 182 days in a calendar year. It does not tax Downtown, Union Square or other properties outside a list of specific commercial corridors. It is assessed at $250 per linear foot of frontage for the first year, $500 for the second and $1000 every year thereafter, and was passed as Proposition D passed in March 2020, with 70% voter approval. The revenues are earmarked for assisting small businesses, including programs that waive all fees for the first year for a small businesses. Long-time owners of properties pay very little property tax in California since the value of their property is not reassessed after purchase, which reduces the incentive to bring their spaces' plumbing and electrical up to code to be able to lease.

San Francisco's Empty Homes Tax (EHT) was a tax on residential units not occupied more than 182 days per year, assessed annually on a sliding scale from $2500 - $5000 depending on square footage, for 2024, increasing to $10,000 - $20,000 by 2026, and scaling with inflation. It was passed by citizen's ballot initiative, Measure M, with 54% voter approval in 2022. In November 2024, Judge Charles Haines prohibited enforcement of the EHT. Christine Dong, writing in the University of Chicago Law Review, argued that there were precedents for taxes and fines of non-productive uses of property at the federal and state level. In September 2026, an appeals court ruled 3-0 that San Francisco's Empty Homes Tax violated California's 1985 Ellis Act.

== Canada ==
Starting in 2022, Canada levied a 1% Underused Housing Tax (UHT) nationwide on underused of vacant homes. Start in 2025, it was scaled back to cover only to foreign nationals and corporations after backlash over the high administrative burden placed on all property owners that raised a relatively small amount revenue.

=== British Columbia ===
The province of British Columbia decided to implement a Speculation and Vacancy Tax province-wide at a rate of 0.5% for Canadian citizens and 2% for foreign owners. The tax rose from 2% to 3% in 2026, with Canadian citizens eligible for tax credits to reduce the tax burden.

The city of Vancouver passed a Vacancy Tax known as the Empty Homes Tax ("EHT") in 2017, initially at a rate of 1% of assessed value. This was increased to 3% in 2021.

The stated purpose was "to address the housing affordability and availability challenges and to increase the supply of rental housing in Vancouver". A study by Lu Han of the Wisconsin School of Business found the tax led to a lasting decline in rents in Vancouver.

The combined taxes led to a vacancy rate of 0.49% in Vancouver by the end of 2024, compared with 6.6% for Seattle. The city had roughly 2500 vacant units in 2017 before the tax started and as of 2024 had less than 1000.

=== Ontario ===
The city of Toronto passed a vacancy tax in 2021, which took effect in 2022 at an initial rate of 1%. This was increased to 3% in 2023. The tax applies to residential properties that are vacant 6 months or more in a year. Homes undergoing renovation are also exempt.

The vacant unit tax (VUT) for Ottawa began in 2022 at a rate of 1% of assessed value per year, increasing by 1% each year a property is vacant up to a maximum of 5%.

The vacant homes tax for Windsor went into effect in 2024 at a rate of 3% before being raised to 4% in 2026.

The vacant homes tax for Hamilton was approved in 2024 at a rate of 1% for the first year.

=== Prince Edward Island and Nova Scotia ===
Non-residents are charged higher property tax rates in both provinces, with vacant units charged a rate of 2% in Nova Scotia.

== France ==
In France, a vacancy tax called "taxe sur les logements vacants" (TLV) can be assessed on residential units that are empty of furnishings. A separate tax "taxe d'habitation" (TH) can also be assessed on non-empty residential units at higher rates for wealthy owners, and for non-primary (e.g., vacation) residences. A 2020 study found a 13% decrease in vacant units as a result of the French taxes in the cities that implemented it.

== Ireland ==
Ireland started assessing a Vacant Homes Tax (VHT) in 2023 that is equal to 3x the property tax bill on homes occupied fewer than 30 days per year. In 2024, the tax was 5x the property bill.

== United Kingdom ==
=== Scotland ===
Starting in 2014, localities in Scotland have been allowed to double the council tax on properties that have been vacant for at least a year, which a number of localities have pursued, including Aberdeen, Glasgow, Dumfries and Galloway and Fife. Starting in 2025, Scotland removed the limit as to what localities could charge for empty properties, resulting in Edinburgh and the Scottish Highlands to charge quadruple the regular tax rate.

=== England ===
As of 2024, many local authorities in England charge more tax for properties that have been vacant for more than a year as a strategy to prevent blight and environmental health issues, and reduce the demand for sprawl while making more housing available. Authorities in Rushcliffe are also, for example, allowed to repair homes that have been vacant for 2+ years and rent them out to recover costs as well as force a sale at auction.

=== Wales ===
As of 2023, Wales allows for higher tax rates on second homes as a strategy for reducing the number of vacant homes, avoiding blight, and making housing more affordable.

== See also ==
- Land value tax
- Luxury tax
- Pied-à-terre
- Sin tax
- Wealth tax
