= Sugary drink tax =

Tax or surcharge on soft drinks with high sugar content

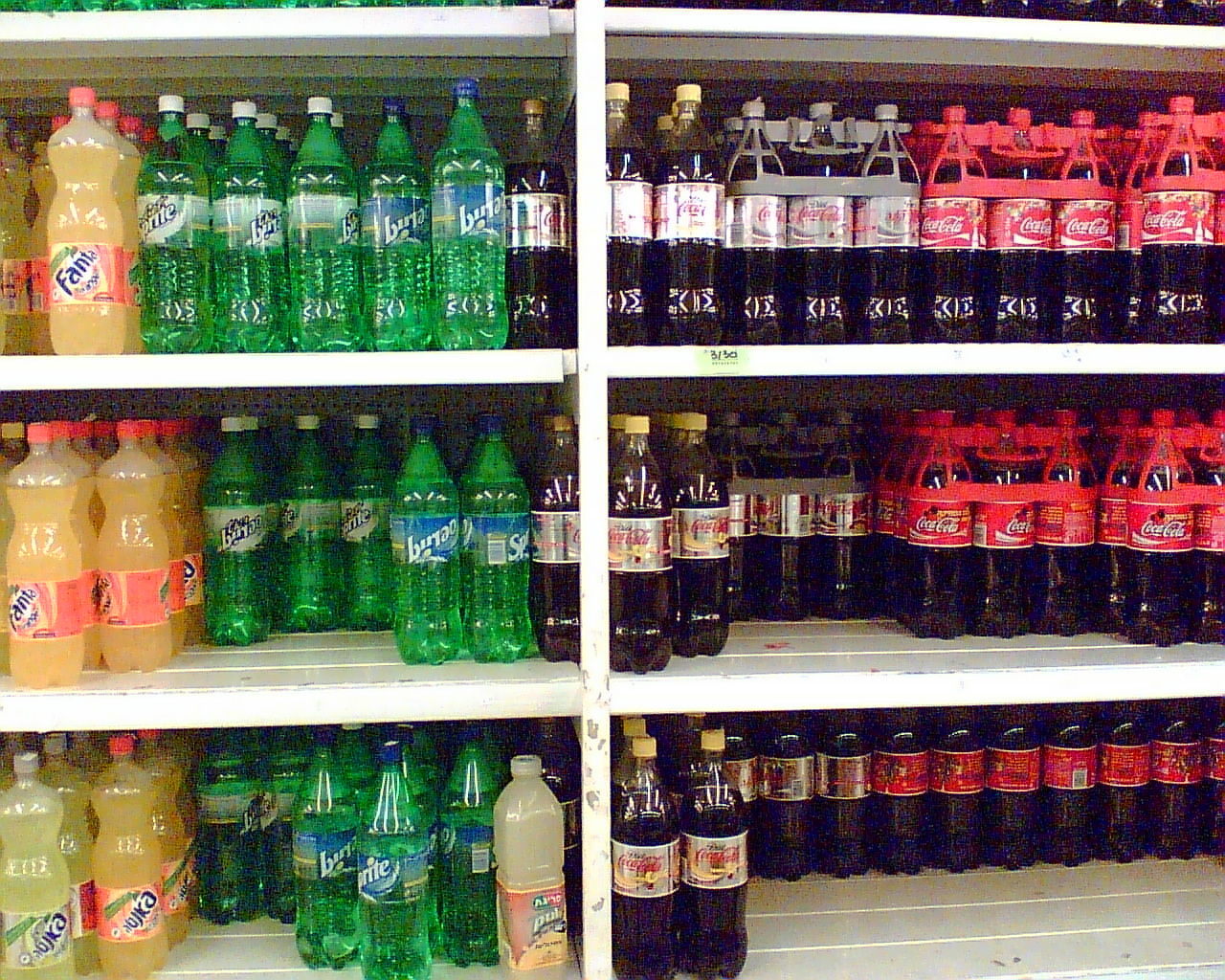
Sugary drink taxes are used in some jurisdictions to decrease consumption.

A sugary drink tax, soda tax, or sweetened beverage tax (SBT) is a tax or surcharge (food-related fiscal policy) designed to reduce consumption of sweetened beverages by making them more expensive to purchase. Drinks covered under a soda tax often include carbonated soft drinks, sports drinks and energy drinks. Fruit juices without added sugar are usually excluded, despite similar sugar content, though there is some debate on including them.

This policy intervention is an effort to decrease obesity and its associated health effects. The tax is a matter of public debate in many countries and beverage producers like Coca-Cola often oppose it. Advocates such as national medical associations and the World Health Organization promote the tax as an example of a Pigouvian tax, aimed to discourage unhealthy diets and offset the growing economic costs of obesity.

== Design ==
Tax design approaches include direct taxes on the product and indirect taxes. Indirect taxes include import/export taxes on sugar or other ingredients before it has been processed and local/regional/international taxes. Sales tax (indirect tax) is paid by the person consuming the item at the time of purchase and collected by the government from the seller. VAT (value added tax) is the most common type of tax and is also added on at the time of purchase, at an amount that is dependent on the value paid for the item. The amount of both VAT and sales tax are directly proportional to the amount of money paid for an item and do not consider the volume of food or drink. For this reason, a large (bulk) item would have less tax compared to a smaller cheaper item (i.e., there is less tax impact on larger packages of a food item).

Most taxes on sugar-sweetened beverages (SSBs) are set volumetrically (i.e., with a constant rate per unit volume), and that "only three SSB taxes worldwide are proportional to sugar content." The study argued that such volumetric taxes "are poorly targeted to the actual health harms from SSBs," and suggested taxing the amount of sugar in beverages, rather than the volume of liquid accompanying the sugar. A design change such as this has been proposed to "boost a SSB tax's health benefits and overall economic gains by roughly 30%."

Increased taxes on sweetened products have been suggested to promote companies to re-formulate their product in order to keep consumer costs affordable by decreasing use of the taxed ingredient (i.e., sugar) in their product. Government revenues from these taxes sometimes are put towards improving public health services, however this is not always the case.

Some point to substitutes like fruit juice, energy-dense snacks and biscuits as ways a tax on processed sugar in drinks might be limited. Jurisdictions where cross-border shopping is convenient can also have the benefits of the tax reduced as some will buy sugary drinks from areas where they are not taxed.

=== Regressive vs. progressive tax ===
The regressive component of the tax is that consumers on lower incomes would spend relatively more up-front due to higher prices than consumers on higher incomes.

The progressive components of the tax include both the health savings and benefits to those who are most price-sensitive and the potential for tax revenue to subsidize healthier foods or other priorities for low-income people.

== Health concerns related to excess sugar in the diet ==
Type 2 diabetes is a growing health concern in many developed and developing countries around the world, with 1.6 million deaths directly due to this disease in 2015 alone. Unlike sugar from food, the sugar from drinks enters the body so quickly that it can overload the pancreas and the liver, leading to diabetes and heart disease over time. A 2010 study said that consuming one to two sugary drinks a day increases your risk of developing diabetes by 26%.

Heart disease is responsible for 31% of all global deaths and although one sugary drink has minimal effects on the heart, consuming sugary drinks daily are associated with long term consequences. A study found that men, for every added serving per day of sugar-sweetened beverages, each serving was associated with a 19% increased risk of developing heart disease. Another study also found increased risks for heart disease in women who drank sugary drinks daily.

Obesity is also a global public and health policy concern, with the percentage of overweight and obese people in many developed and middle income countries rising rapidly. Consumption of added sugar in sugar-sweetened beverages has been positively correlated with high calorie intake, and through it, with excess weight and obesity. The addition of one sugar-sweetened beverage per day to the normal US diet can amount to 15 pounds of weight gain over the course of 1 year. Added sugar is a common feature of many processed and convenience foods such as breakfast cereals, chocolate, ice cream, cookies, yogurts and drinks produced by retailers. The ubiquity of sugar-sweetened beverages and their appeal to younger consumers has made their consumption a subject of particular concern by public health professionals. In both the United States and the United Kingdom, sugar sweetened drinks are the top calorie source in teenager's diets.

A French study published in 2019 on the British Medical Journal also enlighted a possible link between the consumption of sugary drinks (beverages containing more than a 5% of sugar) and a higher or increased risk of developing cancer. Even if the researchers were unable to prove a clear causality between the two factors, they stated that their results can be taken as a confirm that "reducing the amount of sugar in our diet is extremely important."

Dental caries, also known as tooth decay or dental cavities, is the most common noncommunicable disease worldwide. Sugary drink taxes have been discussed as a potential means to reduce the health and economic burden of dental caries.

=== Comparison to tobacco taxes ===
Proponents of soda taxes cite the success of tobacco taxes worldwide when explaining why they think a soda tax will work to lower soda consumption. Where the main concern with tobacco is cancer, the main concerns with soda are diabetes and obesity. The tactics used to oppose soda taxes by soda companies mimic those of tobacco companies, including funding research that downplays the health risks of its products.

== Impact ==
=== Revenue ===
The U.S. Department of Health and Human Services reports that a national targeted tax on sugar in soda could generate $14.9 billion in the first year alone. The Congressional Budget Office (CBO) estimates that a nationwide three-cents-per-12-ounce soft drink ($0.08/L) tax would generate over $24 billion over four years. Some tax measures call for using the revenue collected to pay for relevant health needs: improving diet, increasing physical activity, obesity prevention, nutrition education, advancing healthcare reform, etc. Another area to which the revenue raised by a soda tax might go, as suggested by Mike Rayner of the United Kingdom, is to subsidize healthier foods like fruits and vegetables.

=== Consumption ===
According to a 2019 review of research on sugar drink taxes, the taxes successfully reduced consumption of sugar drinks and reduced adverse health consequences due to the increased price of the drinks, which causes the demand for them to drop. Another review of data up to 2019 found the health benefits as being of very low certainty in a one single study applied to Hungarian settings.

A 10% tax in Mexico enacted in January 2014 reduced consumption by 12% after one year, said one study that had not yet been peer-reviewed.

A study of the 1.5-cent-per-US-fluid-ounce (51 ¢/L) tax in Philadelphia found actual sales of the affected beverages (which included diet beverages) dropped 46% in the city itself, but when accounting for people traveling to neighboring cities without a tax, overall purchases of the affected beverages dropped 22%.

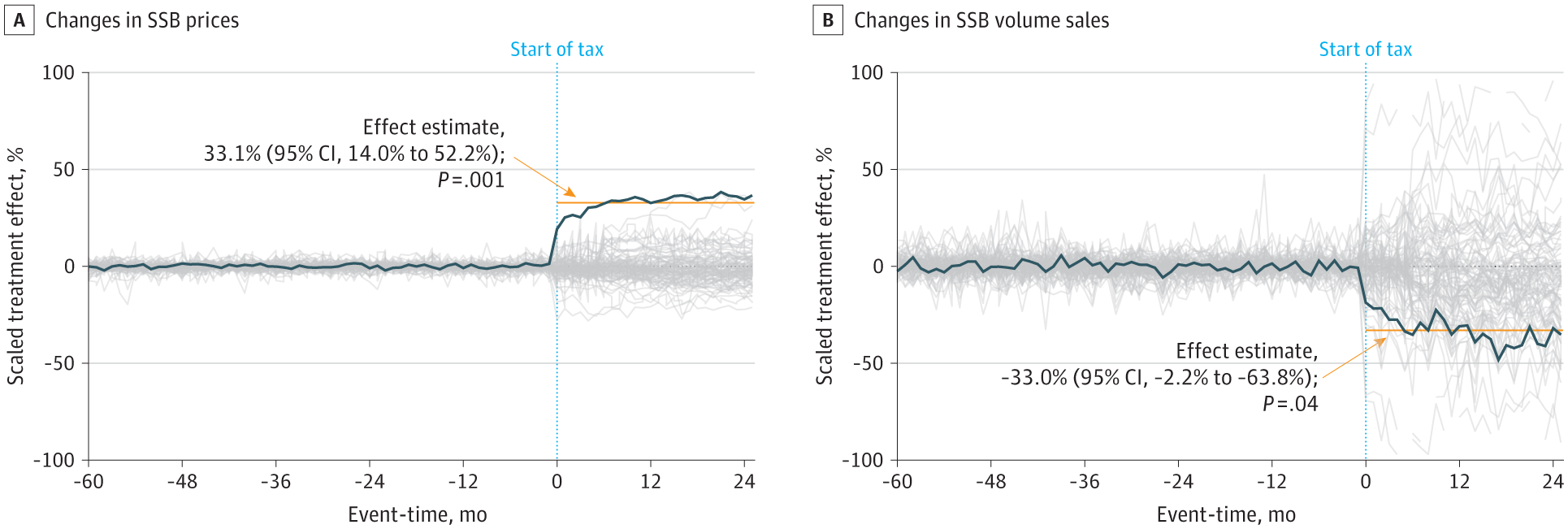
An analysis of sugar-sweetened beverage (SSB) taxes in several U.S. states concluded scaling them could yield substantial public health benefits.

The way that the tax burden is divided upon the consumer and seller depends on the price elasticity for sugary drinks. The tax burden will fall more on sellers when the price elasticity of demand is greater than the price elasticity of supply while on buyers when the price elasticity of supply is greater than the price elasticity of demand. The price elasticity for sugary drinks is different from country to country. For instance, the price elasticity of demand for the sugary drink was found to be -1.37 in Chile while -1.16 in Mexico.

A 2019 National Bureau of Economic Research paper concluded that sugar drink taxes were "welfare enhancing, and indeed that the optimal nationwide SSB tax rate may be higher than the one cent per ounce [$0.34/L] rate most commonly used in U.S. cities." A 2019 study in the Quarterly Journal of Economics estimated that the optimal sugar drink tax on the federal level in the U.S. would be between 1 and 2.1 cents per fluid ounce ($0.34–$0.71/L), whereas the optimal tax on the city-level was 60% lower than that due to cross-border shopping. A 2022 systematic review and meta-analysis of studies from around the world found that sugary drink taxes resulted in higher prices of the targeted beverages and a 15% decrease in the sales of such products.

=== Externalities as a rationale for taxation ===
The purchase of sugary drinks has significant negative externalities when over-consumption causes diseases like obesity and type 2 diabetes. Depending on the national health care system, a significant portion of these costs are paid by taxpayers or insurance rate-payers; lost productivity costs are paid to some degree by employers.

Society as a whole could be worse off if these costs are calculated to be greater than the benefit to the consumers of soda.

A Pigovian tax like a sugary drinks tax, factors these externalities into the price of the beverage. To some degree, this causes people who over-consume soda to pay for health care costs they are causing, which proponents argue is more fair. In theory, this tax could be set at such a level that reduces consumption until the collective private benefit balances the collective costs of poorer health, though this could be accomplished at a lower tax level by using the tax revenue to create childhood nutrition programs or obesity-prevention programs. This would lessen the tax burden on people who consume soda moderately enough not to cause health problems.

== Legislation by country ==
Map of countries (August 2022): Nation-wide sugary drink tax Regional sugary drink tax Sugary drink tax repealed No sugary drink tax

=== Australia ===
The Australian Beverages Council has opposed taxes while the Australian Medical Association and Australian Greens continued to press for a sugar tax.

=== Bahrain ===
Tax since 2017.

=== Barbados ===
Barbados passed a soda tax in September 2015, applied as an excise of 10%.

=== Brunei ===
US$0.29/liter tax since April 2017.

=== Canada ===
In 2020, the Province of British Columbia stopped exempting soda beverages from a 7% provincial sales tax for grocery items. Still fruit juices and non-sweetened carbonated beverages continue to be tax exempt. The measure was introduced based on health recommendations to address youth obesity.

In May 2021, the Province of Newfoundland and Labrador announced a 20 cent per litre tax for sugar sweetened beverages. This tax was implemented on September 1, 2022.

=== Chile ===
In 2014, a measure was passed to increase tax on sugary drinks, and reduce tax on low-sugar drinks. The tax rate was increased from 13% to 18%. A study with data from 2011–2015 found a highly significant decrease in the monthly purchased volume of the higher-taxed, sugary soft drinks by 21.6%. The direction of the reduction was robust to different empirical modelling approaches, but the statistical significance and the magnitude of the changes varied considerably. Furthermore, the authors found a barely significant decrease in the volume of all soft drinks (that is, the higher- and lower-taxed soft drinks).

=== Denmark ===
Denmark instituted a soft drink tax in the 1930s (it amounted to 1.64 Danish krone per liter), but announced in 2013 that they were going to abolish it along with a fat tax, with the stated goal of creating jobs and helping the local economy.

=== Dominica ===
Dominica has a sugar tax since 2015.

=== Fiji ===
Fiji has an import tax and an excise tax on soda.

=== Finland ===
Finland had sugar tax between 1926 and 1999 based on customs categories. Soft drink tax was introduced in 1940. Sugar tax was reintroduced on candy and expanded onto ice cream in 2011, but in 2017 the tax was dropped, after European Commission found it to be unfair state aid.

=== France ===
France first introduced a targeted tax on nonalcoholic sugary drinks at a national level in 2012. The tax, which is 0.0716 euro per liter, applies to both regular and diet soft drinks, flavored mineral water, and fruit juices with added sugar, but does not apply to mineral water and 100% fruit juices (i.e., those with no added sugars). Following introduction, soft drinks were estimated to be up to 3.5% more expensive.

A 2019 article published in the journal PLOS One estimated the price and consumption effects of the tax, using a difference-in-difference methodology. The study concluded: "We find that the tax is transmitted to the prices of taxed drinks, with full transmission for soft drinks and partial transmission for fruit juices. The evidence on purchase responses is mixed and less robust, indicating at most a very small reduction in soft drink purchases (about half a litre per capita per year), an impact which would be consistent with the low tax rate. We find suggestive evidence of a larger response by the sub-sample of heavy purchasers. Fruit juices and water do not seem to have been affected by the tax."

=== French Polynesia ===
French Polynesia implemented taxes on soft drinks in 2002.

=== Hungary ===
Hungary's tax, which came into effect in September 2011, is a 4% tax on foods and drinks that contain large quantities of sugar and salt, such as soft drinks, confectionery, salty snacks, condiments, and fruit jams. In 2016, the tax has resulted in a 22% reduction in energy drink consumption and 19% of people reduced their intake of sugary soft drinks.

=== India ===
40% tax on sugary soda from 1 July 2017.

=== Ireland ===
Sugar tax introduced on 1 May 2018. The tax sees 30 cent per litre added to the price of popular sweetened drinks containing more than 8g of sugar per 100ml.

=== Israel ===
In 2022, Israel imposed a sugary drink tax in an attempt to reduce obesity rates. The tax has been cancelled as of 2023.

=== Italy ===
In 2018, several medical representatives forwarded an official letter to the Minister of Health Giulia Grillo containing a proposal to raise a 20% tax on sugary drinks, seen as a way to generate benefits for consumers' general health. A debate emerged on the introduction of such a tax, seen on the one hand as a possible mean to promote a healthier diet, and on the other as a danger to the sugar industry. In September 2019 the Prime Minister Giuseppe Conte mentioned in a public speech the idea of introducing a tax "on carbonated drinks" (not specifying if it refers only to sugary drinks), referring to it as "practicable".

By the end of 2019 the proposal of a tax on the consumption of sweetened soft drinks equal to 10 Euros per hectolitre in the case of finished products and 0.25 Euros per kilogram in the case of products to be diluted has been officially approved; its official start has been then postponed to 1 January 2022. The association of soft drinks and beverages producers has renewed its opposition to the proposal, estimating that it would have as an effect a contraction of the market equal to 16%.

=== Malaysia ===
Malaysia has a sugary drink tax implemented 1 July 2019.

=== Mauritius ===
Mauritius passed a soda tax in 2013.

=== Mexico ===
In September 2013, Mexico's president Enrique Peña Nieto, on his fiscal bill package, proposed a 10% tax on all soft drinks, especially carbonated drinks, with the intention of reducing the number of patients with diabetes and other cardiovascular diseases in Mexico, which has one of the world's highest rates of obesity. According to Mexican government data, in 2011, the treatment for each patient with diabetes cost the Mexican public health care system (the largest of Latin America) around US$708 per year, with a total cost of 778,427,475 USD in 2010, and with each patient paying only 30 MXN (around US$2.31).

In September 2013, soda companies launched a media campaign to discourage the Mexican Chamber of Deputies and Senate from approving the 10% soda tax. They argued that such measure would not help reduce the obesity in Mexico and would leave hundreds of Mexicans working in the sugar cane industry jobless. They also publicly accused New York City Mayor Michael Bloomberg of orchestrating the controversial bill from overseas. In late October 2013, the Mexican Senate approved a 1 MXN per litre tax (around US$0.08) on sodas, along with a 5% tax on junk food.

Research has shown that Mexico's sugary drinks tax reduced soft drink consumption. According to a 2016 study published in BMJ, annual sales of sodas in Mexico declined 6% in 2014 after the introduction of the soda tax. Monthly sales figures for December 2014 were down 12% on the previous two years. Households with the fewest resources had an average reduction in purchases of 9% in 2014, increasing to 17% by December. Furthermore, purchases of water and non-taxed beverages increased by about 4% on average. Whether the imposition of the tax and the resulting 6% decline in sales of soft drinks will have any measurable impact on long-term obesity or diabetes trends in Mexico has yet to be determined. The authors of the study urged the Mexican authorities to double the tax to further reduce consumption.

A 2016 study published in PLoS Medicine suggested that a 10% excise tax on soda "could prevent 189,300 new cases of Type 2 diabetes, 20,400 strokes and heart attacks, and 18,900 deaths among adults 35 to 94 years old" over a ten-year period. The study also included that "the reductions in diabetes alone could yield savings in projected healthcare costs of $983 million."

A 2017 study in the Journal of Nutrition found a 6.3% reduction in soft drink consumption, with the greatest reductions "among lower-income households, residents living in urban areas, and households with children. We also found a 16.2% increase in water purchases that was higher in low- and middle-income households, in urban areas, and among households with adults only."

=== Nauru ===
Nauru implemented a soda tax in 2007.

=== Netherlands ===
The Netherlands implemented a sugar tax in January of 2024.

Parties that have supported a sugar tax include the Party for the Animals, GroenLinks, D66, Christian Union, and the Labour Party.

Parties that have opposed a sugar tax include the Socialist Party, CDA, SGP, VVD, and the FvD.

=== Norway ===
Norway has had a generalized sugar tax measure on refined sugar products since 1922, introduced to boost state income rather than reducing sugar consumption. Non-alcoholic beverages have since been separated from the general tax, and in 2017, the tax for sugary drinks was set to 3.34 kroner per litre.

In January 2018, the Norwegian government increased the sugar tax level by 83% for general sugar-containing ready-to-eat products, and 42% for beverages. The sugar tax per litre was raised to 4.75 kroner, and applies to beverages which are either naturally or artificially sweetened.

The 42% tax increase on non-alcoholic beverages was attacked by Norwegian retailers and received much media attention. The increase was claimed to encourage even more traffic to the Swedish border shops, as Sweden does not have tax on non-alcoholic beverages. The tax increase was rolled back to 2017-level in 2020.

As a result of a budget settlement, the tax on non-alcoholic beverages was further reduced by 48.1% to 1.82 kroner per litre, effective January 2021.

=== Oman ===
Tax since June 2019.

=== Peru ===
25% tax since May 2018.

=== Philippines ===
In the taxation reform law dubbed as the Tax Reform for Acceleration and Inclusion Law (TRAIN) signed by Philippine President Rodrigo Duterte in December 2017. It includes taxation on sugar-sweetened drinks which will be implemented the following year, as an effort to increase revenue and to fight obesity. Drinks with caloric and non-caloric sweeteners will be taxed ₱6.00 per liter, while those using high-fructose corn syrup, a cheap sugar substitute, will be taxed at ₱12 per liter.

Exempted from the sugar tax are all kinds of milk, whether powdered or in liquid form, ground and 3-in-1 coffee packs, and 100-percent natural fruit and vegetable juices, meal replacements and medically indicated drinks, as well as beverages sweetened with stevia or coco sugar. These drinks, especially 3-in-1 coffee drinks which are popular especially among lower-income families, are to be taxed as initially proposed by the House of Representatives version of the bill, but were exempted in the Senate version.

=== Poland ===
Poland introduced a sugar tax on soft and energy drinks in January 2021. It was reported that after its introduction prices of soft drinks increased by 36% and consumption dropped by 20%.

=== Portugal ===
Portugal introduced a sugary drink tax in 2017. It also has a tax on foods with high sodium.

=== Qatar ===
Tax since January 2019.

=== Samoa ===
Samoa passed a soda tax in 1984.

=== Saudi Arabia ===
Saudi Arabia has a 50% sugar tax only on soft and energy drinks since 10 June 2017, and since 1 December 2019 the same tax percentage applies to all sugary drinks.

=== Singapore ===
During the National Day Rally 2017, Prime Minister Lee Hsien Loong spoke at length on the importance of fighting diabetes. He said, "If you drink soft drinks every day, you are overloading your system with sugar, and significantly increasing your risk of diabetes. Our children are most at risk because soft drinks are part of their lifestyle."

On 4 December 2018, the Ministry of Health began a consultation exercise to seek public's feedback on four proposed measures to fight diabetes including a ban on high-sugar packet drinks and implementation of a sugar tax. On 10 October 2019, the Ministry of Health chose to ban advertisements of drinks with high sugar content; making Singapore the first country in the world to do so, as well as introduce color-coded labels. This comes after a public consultation favored these two options out of four. The labels will indicate drinks as "healthy", "neutral", "unhealthy" and take into account the amount of sugar and saturated fat contained in drinks, among other factors. They will be compulsory for "unhealthy" drinks and optional for "healthy" ones, covering instant drinks, soft drinks, juices, cultured milk and yogurt drinks in bottles, cans and packs. These measures will take effect sometime in 2020.

=== South Africa ===
South Africa proposed a sugar-sweetened beverages tax in the 2016 South African national government budget. South Africa introduced a sugar tax on 1 April 2018. The levy was fixed at 2.1 cents per gram of sugar, for each gram above 4g per 100ml of sweetened beverage. The levy excludes fruit juices, despite health professionals warning that fruit juice is as bad for a person as highly sugary drinks. In 2022, the government considered extending the tax to fruit juices.

=== St Helena ===
In March 2014, the government of the island of St Helena, a British Overseas Territory in the South Atlantic, announced that it would be introducing an additional import duty of 75 pence per litre on sugar-sweetened carbonated drinks with more than 15 grams of sugar per litre. The measure was introduced in May 2014 as part of a number of measures to tackle obesity on the island and the resulting high incidence of type 2 diabetes.

=== Thailand ===
Sugar tariffs since Oct 2017.

=== Tonga ===
Tonga has a soda tax.

=== United Arab Emirates ===
In October 2017, the United Arab Emirates introduced a 50% tax on soft drinks and a 100% tax on energy drinks, to curb unhealthy consumption of sugary drinks that can lead to diabetes; it also added a 100% tax on cigarettes. From 1 January 2020, the UAE would impose a tax on all products which contains sugar or artificial sweeteners.

=== United Kingdom ===
In the 2016 United Kingdom budget, the UK Government announced the introduction of a sugar tax, officially named the "Soft Drinks Industry Levy". The tax came into effect on 6 April 2018. Beverage manufacturers are taxed according to the volume of sugar-sweetened beverages they produce or import. The tax is imposed at the point of production or importation, in two bands. Drinks with total sugar content above 5g per 100 millilitres are taxed at 18p per litre and drinks above 8g per 100 millilitres at 24p per litre. The measure was estimated to generate an additional £1 billion a year in tax revenue which would be spent on funding for sport in UK schools. The tax raised £336m in 2019-2020. Despite not being part of the United Kingdom the British Soft Drinks Industry Levy came into force on the Isle of Man on 1 April 2019 because of the Common Purse Agreement. It was proposed that pure fruit juices, milk-based drinks and the smallest producers would not be taxed.

Some soft drink manufacturers voluntarily reduced the sugar content of their products in order to avoid the taxation. For example, Barr's changed the recipe of their best selling Irn Bru soft drink in 2018 and many long-term consumers were disappointed at the change to the drink. Cans and bottles dated before then sold for hundreds of pounds on websites such as eBay following the outcry.

A 2024 study led by the University of Cambridge found that, in the 11 months after the implementation of the tax, daily sugar consumption from drinks had fallen on average by 3.0g in children and 5.2g in adults. A 2025 study found that the tax reduced "intake of about 6,600 calories per year per UK resident, 80% of which is attributable to reformulation by manufacturers."

In November 2025, the new Labour Government announced that the Soft Drinks Industry Levy would be widened to include pre-packaged milkshakes, coffees and protein drinks, as well as lowering the sugar threshold to 4.5g per 100 millilitres. The measures were cautiously welcomed by the think tank The Food Policy Institute.

=== United States ===
The United States does not have a nationwide soda tax, but taxes have been passed by localities. A few states also impose excise taxes on bottled soft drinks or on wholesalers, manufacturers, or distributors of soft drinks.

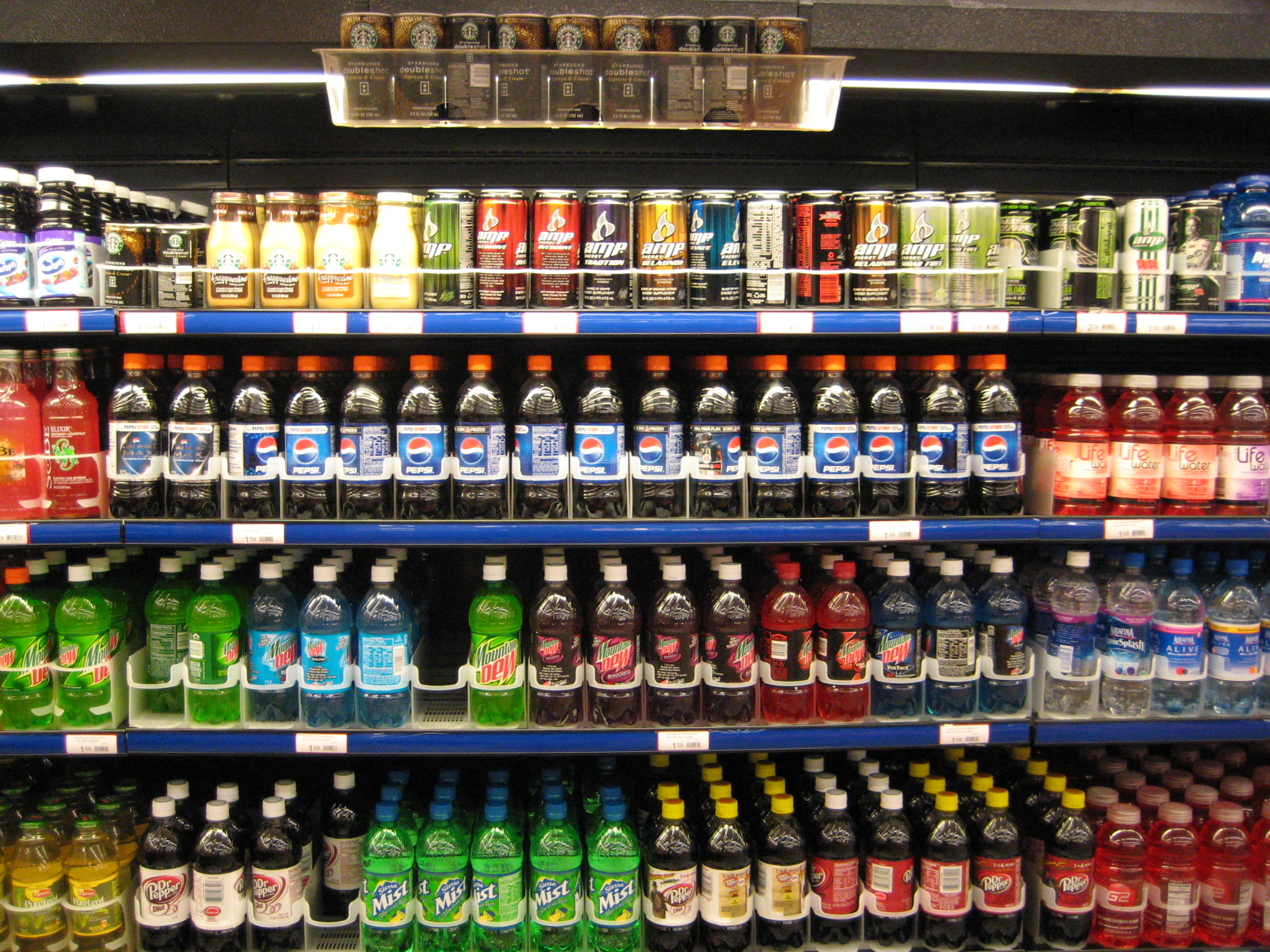
Supermarket chilled beverage selection

==== Berkeley, California ====
The Measure D soda tax was approved by 76% of Berkeley voters on 4 November 2014, and took effect on 1 January 2015 as the first such tax in the United States. The measure imposes a tax of one cent per US fluid ounce (34 ¢/L) on the distributors of specified sugar-sweetened beverages such as soda, sports drinks, energy drinks, and sweetened ice teas but excluding milk-based beverages, meal replacement drink, diet sodas, fruit juice, and alcohol. The revenue generated will enter the general fund of the City of Berkeley.

In August 2015, researchers found that average prices for beverages covered under the law rose by less than half of the tax amount. For Coke and Pepsi, 22 percent of the tax was passed on to consumers, with the balance paid by vendors. UC Berkeley researchers found a higher pass-through rate for the tax: 47% of the tax was passed-through to higher prices of sugar-sweetened beverages overall with 69% being passed-through to higher soda prices. In August 2016, a UC Berkeley study (relying on self-reporting) showed a 21% drop in the drinking of soda and sugary beverages in low-income Berkeley neighborhoods after a few months. A study from 2016 compared the changing intake of sugar sweetened beverages and water in Berkeley versus San Francisco and Oakland (which did not have a sugary drink tax passed) before and after Berkeley passed its sugary drink tax. This analysis showed a 26% decrease of soda consumption in Berkeley and 10% increase in San Francisco and Oakland while water intake increased by 63% in Berkeley and 19% in the two neighboring cities.

A 2017 before and after study concluded that one year after the tax was introduced in Berkeley, sugary drink sales decreased by 9.6% when compared to a scenario where the tax was not in place. This same study also showed that overall consumer spending did not increase, contradicting the argument of opponents of the Sugary Drink Tax. Results from another 2017 study were that purchases of healthier drinks went up and sales of sugary drinks went down, without overall grocery bills increasing or the local food sector losing money. A 2019 study relying on self-reporting found a 53% drop in consumption in low-income neighborhoods after three years.

==== Oakland, California ====
A one-cent-per-ounce soda tax (Measure HH) passed with over 60% of the vote on 8 November 2016. The tax went into effect on 1 July 2017.

==== San Francisco, California ====
A one-cent-per-ounce soda tax (Prop V) passed with over 61% of the vote on 8 November 2016 and applies to distributors of sugary beverages on 1 January 2018. Exemptions for the tax include infant formulas, milk products, supplements, drinks used for medical reasons, and 100% fruit and vegetable juices. The soda industry doubled their spending from 2014 to almost $20 million in its unsuccessful push to defeat the soda tax initiative, a record-breaking amount for a San Francisco ballot initiative.

==== Albany, California ====
A one-cent-per-US-fluid-ounce (34 ¢/L) soda tax (Prop O1) passed with over 70% of the vote on 8 November 2016. The tax went into effect on 1 April 2017.

==== Santa Cruz, California ====
A voter approved, two-cents-per-ounce soda tax was implemented in April 2025.

==== Boulder, Colorado ====
A two-cents-per-ounce soda tax (Measure 2H) passed with 54% of the vote on 8 November 2016. The tax took effect on 1 July 2017, and revenue will be spent on health promotion, general wellness programs and chronic disease prevention that improve health equity, and other health programs especially for residents with low income and those most affected by chronic disease linked to sugary drink consumption. The University of Colorado, Boulder, campus was granted a one-year exemption from the tax as school officials survey what types of drinks students wish to have.

==== Cook County, Illinois ====
A one-cent-per-ounce soda tax passed on 10 November 2016. The campaign to introduce the tax was heavily funded by Mike Bloomberg. The tax went into effect on 2 August. Due to a conflict with the Supplemental Nutrition Assistance Program, this soda tax did not apply to any soda purchases made with food stamps, which were used by over 870,000 people. On 10 October 2017, the Board of Commissioners voted to repeal the tax in a 15–1 vote. The tax stayed in effect up until 1 December. The tax was unpopular and seen as an attempt to plug the county's $1.8 billion budget deficit, rather than a public health measure.

==== Navajo Nation ====
In addition to the general sales tax (6 percent as of July 1, 2018) the Navajo Nation levies a special Junk Food Tax on applicable junk food items. The Junk Food Tax rate is 2 percent and applies to sales of sweetened beverages.

==== Philadelphia, Pennsylvania ====
Philadelphia mayor Jim Kenney initially proposed a citywide soda tax that would raise the price of soda at three cents per fluid ounce ($1.0/L), which would have been the highest soda tax rate in the United States. Kenney promoted using tax revenue to fund universal pre-K, jobs, and development projects while reducing sugar intake. The American Beverage Association (ABA) spent $10.6 million in 2016 in its effort against the tax. The American Medical Association, American Heart Association, and other medical and public health groups supported the tax. The Philadelphia City Council approved a 1.5-cent-per-US-fluid-ounce (50.72 ¢/L) tax on 16 June 2016, effective on 1 January 2017.

A 2017 study found that Philadelphia's tax has decreased sugary beverage consumption in impoverished youth by 1.3 drinks/week. Langellier et al. also found that when paired with the pre-K program, attendance increases significantly, a finding that is likely to have longer term positive effects than a sugary drink tax alone. A 2019 study (which has yet to be peer-reviewed) of the 1.5-cent-per-US-fluid-ounce (50.72 ¢/L) tax in Philadelphia found purchases of the affected beverages (which included diet beverages) dropped 20% after some residents bought more in other jurisdictions.

==== Seattle, Washington ====
On 5 June 2017, Seattle's City Council voted 7–1 to pass a 1.75 cents per US fluid ounce (59 ¢/L) tax on sugary drinks, with implementation beginning on 1 January 2018. The final tax includes sugar-sweetened sodas, juice drinks with sugar added, and some but not all coffee products containing sugar; during the drafting process, the city's powerful specialty coffee industry lobbied for the limitations on which coffee drinks were subject to the tax, and the City Council debated also taxing artificially-sweetened sodas on grounds of racial and economic equity.

Seattle collected over $17 million in the first nine months of the tax, against a pre-implementation annual estimate of $15 million a year; the price increase on taxed beverages has mostly been passed on to consumers. Post-implementation studies conducted by the city auditor, University of Washington, and University of Illinois Chicago have shown a roughly 20% decrease in the sales of taxed beverages as well as a small decrease in youth Body Mass Index and its rate of change relative to areas outside the city.

In 2018, Washington state voters approved Initiative 1634 which bans new taxes on grocery items such as sugary drinks, blocking other Washington cities from adding a sugary drink tax. Funding for the "Yes on 1634" campaign included over $20 million from major beverage producers.

== Scientific studies ==
2015 emails revealed that funding by Coca-Cola for scientific studies sought to influence research to be more favorable to their business interests. A 2016 meta-analysis found that research funded by soda companies was 34 times more likely to find that soda has no significant health impacts on obesity or diabetes.

=== Individual studies ===
Taxing soda can lead to a reduction in overall consumption, according to a scientific study published in the Archives of Internal Medicine in March 2010. The study found that a 10 percent tax on soda led to a 7 percent reduction in calories from soft drinks. These researchers believe that an 18 percent tax on these foods could cut daily intake by 56 calories per person, resulting in a weight loss of 5 pounds (2.3 kg) per person per year. The study followed 5,115 young adults ages 18 to 30 from 1985 to 2006.

A 2010 study published in the medical journal Health Affairs found that if taxes were about 18 cents on the dollar, they would make a significant difference in consumption.

Research from Duke University and the National University of Singapore released in December 2010 tested larger taxes and determined that a 20 percent and 40 percent taxes on sugar-sweetened beverages would largely not affect calorie intake because people switch to untaxed, but equally caloric, beverages. Kelly Brownell, a proponent of soda taxes, reacted by stating that "[t]he fact is that nobody has been able to see how people will really respond under these conditions." Similarly, a 2010 study concluded that while people would drink less soda as a result of a soda tax, they would also compensate for this reduction by switching to other high-calorie beverages. In response to these arguments, the American Public Health Association released a statement in 2012 in which they argued that "Even if individuals switch to 100% juice or chocolate milk, this would be an improvement, as those beverages contribute some nutrients to the diet."

A 2011 study in the journal Preventive Medicine concluded that "a modest tax on sugar-sweetened beverages could both raise significant revenues and improve public health by reducing obesity". It has been used by the Rudd Center for Food Policy and Obesity at Yale to estimate revenue from a soda tax, depending on the state, year and tax rate.

A 2012 study by Y. Claire Wang, also in the journal Health Affairs, estimates that a 1-cent-per-US-fluid-ounce (33.81 ¢/L) tax on sugared beverages could prevent 2.4 million cases of diabetes per year, 8,000 strokes, and 26,000 premature deaths over 10 years.

In 2012, just before the city of Richmond began voting on a soda tax, a study was presented at a conference held by the American Public Health Association regarding the potential effects of such a tax in California. The study concluded that, given that soda's price elasticity is such that taxing it would reduce consumption by 10–20 percent, that this reduction "...is projected to reduce diabetes incidence by 2.9–5.6% and CHD by 0.6–1.2%."

A 2013 study in the American Journal of Agricultural Economics concluded that a 0.5-cent-per-US-fluid-ounce (16.91 ¢/L) tax on soft drinks would reduce consumption, but "increase sodium and fat intakes as a result of product substitution," in line with the Duke University study mentioned above.

A 2014 study published in the American Journal of Public Health concluded that Sugar-Sweetened Beverages (SSBs) don't have a negative impact on employment. Even though job losses in the taxed industry occurred, they were offset by new employment in other sectors of the economy.

A 2016 modelling study estimated that a 20% tax on SSBs would decrease the consumption of SSBs in Australia by 12.6%. The tax could decline the prevalence of obesity in the Australian population, which could lead to gains in health-adjusted life years. The results showed an increase of 7.6 days in full health for a 20-24-year-old male and a 3.7 day increase in longevity for their female peers.

Between 2016 and 2020, economists from the University of Iowa, Cornell University, and Mathematica, a policy research firm, conducted a multiyear study of local sweetened-beverage taxes in Philadelphia, Oakland, Seattle, and San Francisco. The study examined the taxes' one-year impacts on purchases, consumption, tax pass-through rates, pricing, and product availability. It was the first to look at the impacts on Oakland's sugar-sweetened beverage tax and the first to look at impacts of the taxes on children's consumption in either Philadelphia or Oakland. The study found that almost a year after Philadelphia and Oakland implemented taxes on sweetened beverages, purchases of sweetened beverages declined overall even as some of the effect is reduced by city residents shopping more in nearby untaxed jurisdictions. Consumption did not decline significantly overall in Philadelphia or Oakland, but there is more evidence of reduced consumption in Philadelphia, particularly among certain groups. Findings from the project have been published in peer-reviewed journals, such as the Journal of Policy Analysis and Management, Economics and Human Biology, the Journal of Health Economics, as well as in working papers hosted by the National Bureau of Economic Research and in Mathematica issue briefs.

== Proposals ==
=== Colombia ===
A 2016 proposal for a 20% sugary drink tax, campaigned by Educar Consumidores, was turned down by the Colombian legislature despite opinion polls showing 70% support for it. Health officials and media outlets received substantial pressure against speaking out in favor of the tax.

=== United States ===
Some of the most notable early tax proposals include:

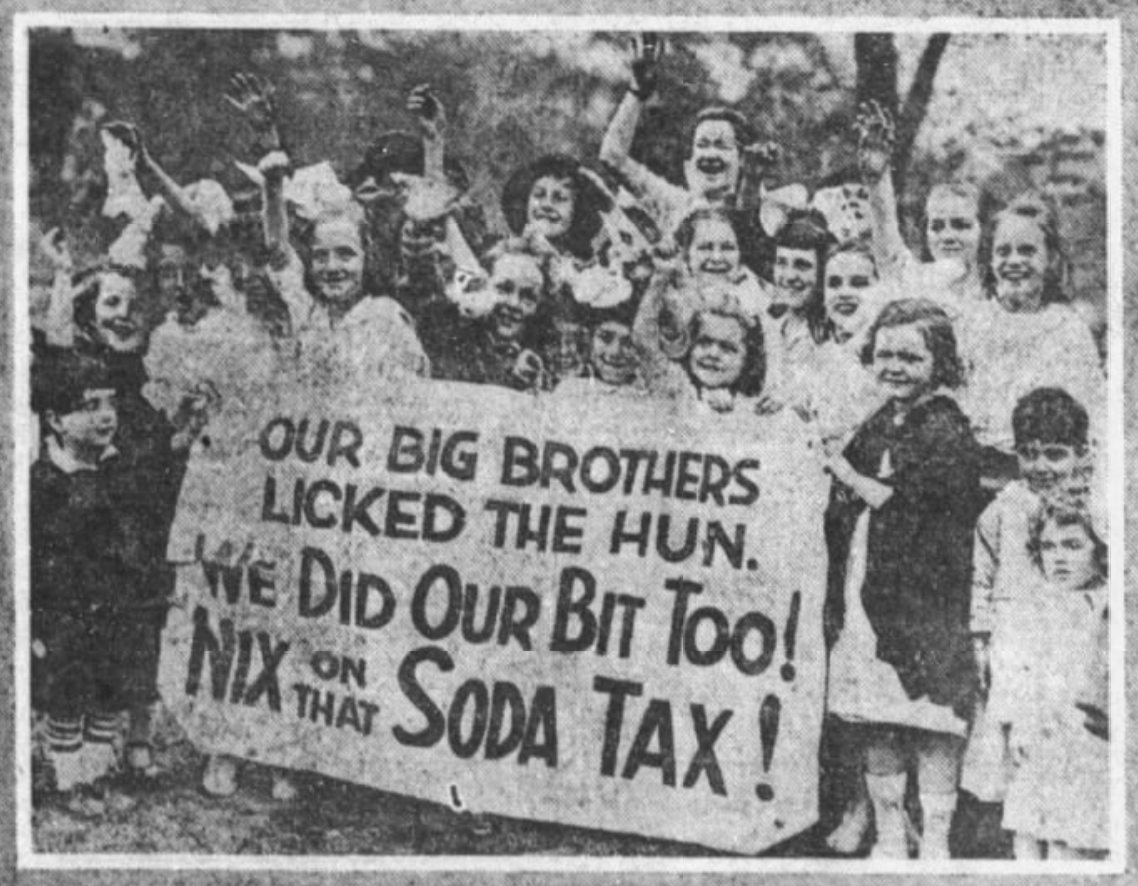
Protesters in 1919 call for an end to a soda tax.

- In 1914 U.S. President Woodrow Wilson proposed a special revenue tax on soft drinks, beer and patent medicine after the outbreak of World War I.
- In 2009, the Obama Administration explored an excise tax on sweetened beverages during health care reform efforts.
- In 2010, New York State explored a soda tax. (separate from Sugary drinks portion cap rule)
- In 2012, the City Council of Richmond, California was voted down at the ballot.
- The California State Legislature saw a variety of soda tax proposals including in 2013, In 2014, and 2016.
- In June 2013, the city of Telluride, Colorado had a proposed tax voted down.
- In July 2014, U.S. Representative Rosa DeLauro of Connecticut, proposed a national soda tax.
- In November 2014, voters in San Francisco and Berkeley, California voted on soda tax ballot measures. The measure was approved in Berkeley and received 55% of the vote in San Francisco, but was short of the needed 2/3 supermajority.
- In a May 2017 election, Santa Fe's proposed tax on all sugar-sweetened beverages was voted down.

==== Public support ====
A 2016 poll by Morning Consult-Vox finds Americans split on their support of a soda tax. A 2013 poll concluded that "respondents were opposed to government taxes on sugary drinks and candy by a more than 2-to-1 margin." In California, however, support for a tax has been high for a few years. According to a Field Poll conducted in 2012, "Nearly 3 out of 5 California voters would support a special fee on soft drinks to fight childhood obesity."

== See also ==
- Carbon tax
- List of sovereign states by body mass index
- Satiety value
- Sin tax
