= BetonSports =

British online gambling company

- Industry: online gambling
- Founded: 1995
- Founder: Gary Kaplan
- Defunct: 2006
- Area served: United Kingdom; United States
- Key people: David Carruthers (CEO)

BetonSports plc was a British online gambling company founded by Gary Kaplan in 1995. It stopped operating in 2006 after the arrest of its CEO, David Carruthers.

The company was one of the biggest players in the United States online gaming market, drawing in several billion US dollars in wagers in the early 2000s. In June 2006 US authorities indicted the company and a number of its executives on RICO, mail fraud, and tax evasion charges arising from its supplying online betting to customers in the United States (the alleged crimes took place before the adoption of the Unlawful Internet Gambling Enforcement Act of 2006).

In July 2004 the company was floated on the Alternative Investment Market of the London Stock Exchange with the ticker symbol BSS.LN. Although listed in London, the majority of its operations were in several Caribbean locations (principally Aruba, Antigua, and later Costa Rica) and almost all of its customers were within the United States.

In July 2006 the United States District Court for the Eastern District of Missouri issued a sealed indictment of the company and a number of people related to its operations. The indictment was unsealed later that month when CEO David Carruthers was arrested in Dallas while returning to Costa Rica after attending the company's annual general meeting in London. Shortly after Carruthers' arrest trading in the company's stock was suspended. At that time BetonSports employed around 2,000 workers in Costa Rica. The company later terminated Carruthers and agreed to discontinue its US business.

In March 2007 founder Gary Kaplan was arrested in the Dominican Republic and was extradited to the US. In August 2009 Kaplan pleaded guilty to three charges, including a racketeering charge.

On 8 January 2010 it was announced that David Carruthers had been sentenced to 33 months in prison.
