= Fat tax =

Surcharge on fattening foods or drinks

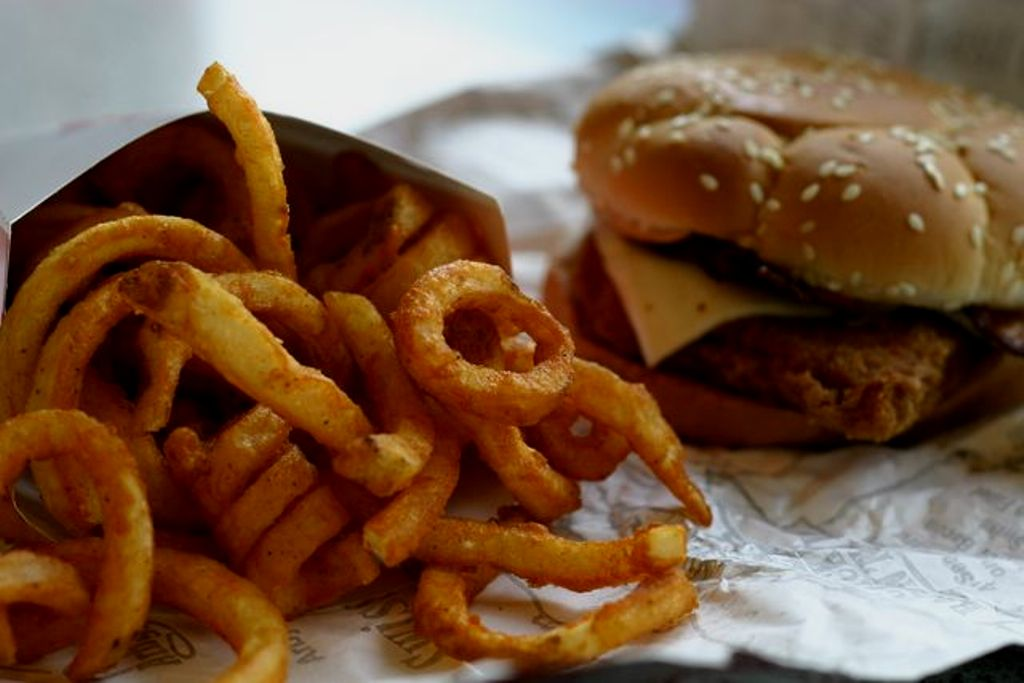
The fat tax aims to reduce the consumption of foods that are high in saturated fat, such as fast food.

A fat tax is a tax or surcharge that is placed upon fattening food, beverages or on overweight individuals. It is considered an example of Pigovian taxation. A fat tax aims to discourage unhealthy diets and offset the economic costs of obesity.

A fat tax aims to decrease the consumption of foods that are linked to obesity. A related idea is to tax foods that are linked to increased risk of coronary heart disease. Numerous studies suggest that as the price of a food decreases, individuals get fatter. In fact, eating behavior may be more responsive to price increases than to nutritional education. Estimates suggest that a 1 cent per ounce tax on sugar-sweetened beverages may reduce the consumption of those beverages by 25%. However, there is also evidence that obese individuals are less responsive to changes in the price of food than normal-weight individuals.

To implement a fat tax, it is necessary to specify which food and beverage products will be targeted. This must be done with care, because a carelessly chosen food tax can have surprising and perverse effects. For instance, consumption patterns suggest that taxing saturated fat would induce consumers to increase their salt intake, thereby putting themselves at greater risk for cardiovascular death. Current proposals frequently single out sugar-sweetened drinks as a target for taxation. Cross-sectional, prospective, and experimental studies have found an association between obesity and the consumption of sugar-sweetened drinks. However, experimental studies have not always found an association, and the size of the effect can be very modest.

Since the poor spend a greater proportion of their income on food, a fat tax might be regressive. Taxing foods that provide primarily calories, with little other nutritional value reduces this problem, since calories are readily available from many sources in diet of industrialized nations. To make a fat tax less burdensome for the poor, proponents recommend earmarking the revenues to subsidize healthy foods and health education. Additionally, proponents have argued that the fat tax is less regressive to the extent that it lowers medical expenditures and expenditures on the targeted foods among the poor. Indeed, there is a higher incidence of diet-related illnesses among the poor than in the general population.

Unlike placing restrictions on foods or ingredients, a fat tax would not limit consumer choice, only change relative prices.

== Benefits of a fat tax ==
Public health practitioners and scholars in a range of different countries have called for a fat tax on unhealthy foods. The reasoning behind implementing a fat tax is the hope that people will avoid risky dietary behaviours, improving health outcomes in society. Research indicates that the current obesity epidemic is increasing as a result of the fast food industry expanding. Junk food outlets are changing the dietary habits of society, pushing out traditional restaurants and leading to the detrimental health effects of obesity, diabetes and heart disease. Taxes on tobacco have seen smoking rates decrease, and as a result there have been calls for fat taxes to be implemented in more countries in an attempt to reduce the consumption of unhealthy foods.

== Criticism ==
The overall goal of a fat tax is to incentivize consumers to change their preference of specific foods which are deemed unhealthy to prefer healthier foods. While its intentions are good, there are many issues which this tax rate could bring forth. Lower-income households in some countries tend to eat more unhealthy food due to their lower price. For example, in the United States, the fact that junk food is cheaper than healthier food can be linked to the obesity epidemic, especially poorer households. The institution of a fat tax could hurt those in lower-income households as many of them rely on the cheaper, less healthy foods that would be taxed under such a policy. Since households that are poor typically spend up to 30% of their total income on food, they would not only be unable to afford the healthier foods but they would also be forced to pay more for the foods that they could afford.

Such a tax could also inadvertently tax healthy foods. A fat tax would have to be written very specifically to ensure that healthy foods such as nuts, seeds, avocados and fatty fish, which are all high in fats, are not taxed accidentally.

There is also no guarantee that consumers will change their eating habits. Other similar taxes on tobacco and alcohol have been found to be fairly successful, with many implementations lowering the amount of adults who smoke or drink. There is also the case where sugary drinks were taxed in Philadelphia, and instead of consumers swapping to more-healthy and untaxed drinks, many drove elsewhere to buy sugary drinks or continued to buy the more expensive taxed drinks.

== History ==
The first such taxes were introduced in the USA in 1925. Dr Harvey Wiley criticised an increase in tax on oleomargarine (but commonly called the Butter Tax) as it punished artificial products whilst allowing adulterated butter to be untaxed. The purpose of this tax was health oriented but was focused on food purity rather than on its fattening properties.

In 1942, U.S. physiologist A. J. Carlson suggested levying a fee on each pound of overweight, both to counter an "injurious luxury" and to make more food available for the war effort. The concept was reintroduced by Milton Merryweather and P. Franklin Alexander in the late 1970s, but became well known in the early 1980s by Kelly D. Brownell, director of the Rudd Center for Food Policy and Obesity at Yale. Brownell proposed that revenue from junk food taxes be used to subsidize more healthful foods and fund nutrition campaigns.

In a 1994 op-ed in The New York Times, Brownell noted that food costs were out of balance, with healthy foods costing more than unhealthy ones. The New York Times op-ed piece that proposed the "fat tax" elicited controversy and outrage nationwide. Author Kelly Brownell became the focal point of this controversy, especially from Rush Limbaugh, who spoke out adamantly against the tax and the general principle of governmental intrusion into food choices and a possible invasion of privacy. Brownell's proposal was listed as number seven on the list of U.S. News & World Report's "16 Smart Ideas to Fix the World". Because of this and other work, Brownell was named by Time magazine as one of the "World's Most Influential People". In 2000, a paper in the British Medical Journal outlined the potential impact on deaths from ischemic heart disease of a tax on the main sources of saturated fats. In December 2003, The World Health Organization proposed that nations consider taxing junk foods to encourage people to make healthier food choices. According to the WHO report, "Several countries use fiscal measures to promote availability of and access to certain foods; others use taxes to increase or decrease consumption of food; and some use public funds and subsidies to promote access among poor communities to recreational and sporting facilities."

Bruce Silverglade, director of legal affairs for the Center for Science in the Public Interest, said his nonprofit nutrition advocacy organization welcomed the recommendations and has spent years fighting for measures like a junk food tax. The proposal got more traction when New York Assemblyman Felix Ortiz proposed taxes on junk food and entertainment contributing to sedentary lifestyles to fund nutrition and exercise programs. It should also be remembered that taxing foodstuffs is not an argument for increasing taxation. Other taxes can be reduced commensurately if the overall objective is to keep the tax revenue neutral. The fat tax is an argument for raising taxes on activities that we prefer to discourage (consumption of certain foodstuffs) rather than raising taxes on socially desirable activities. Therefore, opponents of this type of taxation must identify which taxes are preferable to taxing these foodstuffs.

Other advocates of the tax, such as Jonathan Gruber point to the effect taxes have had on alcohol and tobacco use. Five studies published between 1981 and 1998 found that drinking declined as the price of alcohol increased. The same holds for tobacco. In California, in 1988, Proposition 99 increased the state tax by 25 cents per cigarette pack and allocated a minimum of 20% of revenue to fund anti-tobacco education. From 1988 to 1993, the state saw tobacco use decline by 27%, three times more than the U.S. average.

A CBS News poll from January 2010 reported that a tax on items such as soft drinks and foods considered to be junk food is opposed 60% to 38%. An even larger number, 72% of Americans, also believed that a tax would not actually help people lose weight. However, the question of whether or not taxation influences diet is an empirical question and not simply a matter of public opinion. However, a February 2010 poll by the Quinnipiac University Polling Institute found that New York City residents overwhelmingly favor a soft drink tax, with 76 percent wanting the tax, and 22 percent opposing it. The poll found both Republicans and Democrats favor the tax.

In October 2011, British prime minister David Cameron told reporters that his government might introduce a Fat Tax as part of the solution to the UK's high obesity rate.

=== Japan ===
Japan implemented the 'metabo' law which included the measurement of waist sizes in 2008 in attempt to overcome increasing obesity rates. The New York Times wrote: "To reach its goals of shrinking the overweight population by 10 percent over the next four years and 25 percent over the next seven years, the government will impose financial penalties on companies and local governments that fail to meet specific targets. The country's Ministry of Health argues that the campaign will keep the spread of diseases like diabetes and strokes in check." The 'metabo' law involved conducting an annual waist measurement check of people aged between 40 and 75, which was administered by employers and local government.

The role of employers and local government was to ensure there was a minimum of 65% participation, with a goal to decrease Japan's obesity rates by 25% by 2015 and failure to meet these goals results in a fine. However, this has erroneously been taken to mean that the 'metabo' law makes obesity illegal.

=== Denmark ===
In October 2011, Denmark introduced a fat tax on butter, milk, cheese, pizza, meat, oil and processed food if the item contains more than 2.3% saturated fat. However, in November 2012, the Danish Tax Ministry announced it would abolish the fat tax, stating that it failed to change Danes' eating habits, had encouraged cross border trading, put Danish jobs at risk and had been a bureaucratic nightmare for producers and outlets. The failure of Denmark's fat tax was also due to financial reasons, with politicians identifying the fat tax as a funding source for the government, rather than a health initiative that attempted to improve the health outcomes of society. The proposed sugar tax plans were also scrapped. While this tax was a failure in terms of changing consumer habits overall, it did achieve some of its goals in the short term. According to a research collaboration done by Oxford University and Copenhagen University, it was found that 4% less saturated fat was bought and more fruit and vegetables were bought in response to this tax. However, one downside was an increase of consumption for salt.

Mette Gjerskov, the Danish minister of food, agriculture and fisheries, stated that "the fat tax is one of the most criticized we had in a long time. Now we have to try to improve public health by other means." Although the tax resulted in an additional $216 million in revenue, it also led to numerous complaints from Danish retailers that their customers were taking their business to other countries, such as Sweden and Germany, to take advantage of their lower prices.

=== India ===
In the Indian state of Kerala which is ruled by CPI(M), as a part of June 2016 budgets, the government proposed a 14.5% "fat tax" on burgers, pizzas and other junk food served in branded restaurants which officials from the quick service industry termed as 'detrimental' to consumption. Industry estimates suggest there are 50-75 outlets of organised fast-food restaurant chains in Kerala, including global brands McDonald's, Chicking, Burger King, Pizza Hut, Domino's Pizza and Subway. Kerala is the first state in India to introduce a "fat tax" on burgers, pizzas, doughnuts and tacos served in branded restaurants.

== See also ==
- Pigovian tax
- Sin tax
- Sugary drink tax
