= Wagering excise taxes =

Wagering excise taxes, also known as federal taxes, are levied against specific gaming forms in the United States. Wagers are accepted by places such as casinos, racetracks, and sports betting companies. Wagering excise taxes are indirect, meaning that rather than the tax being imposed directly on individuals or companies, they are imposed on transactions. These taxes place financial duties on providers while indirectly affecting participants who engage in gambling activities; these taxes work as a dual purpose by raising money for the government while also regulating the gambling sector. Excise taxes are collected by providers as a percentage of each wager, differentiating between state-authorized and unauthorized wagers. While state-authorized wagers are taxed 0.25%, illegal gambling is subject to a higher tax of 2% to dissuade unregulated wagering. The differential tax rate is intended to deter illegal gambling activities.

== Historical and structural overview ==
In the United States, excise taxes are applied to specific goods and services, including legal and illegal gambling transactions. Such taxes are deemed as indirect since they are imposed on transactions rather than individuals or corporations. Excise taxes are often used to regulate activities deemed harmful, such as wagering, alcohol, and tobacco, while also generating revenue for the government. Historically, such taxes were known as "sin taxes," created to discourage illegal gambling and manage legal betting operations. The 1951 Revenue Act was one of the earliest legislative efforts to impose federal taxes on gambling, establishing a 10% tax rate on sports betting to counter organized crime and exert control over the gambling sector. Today, wagering excise taxes continues to play a dual role in society, raising funds and serving as a tool for regulation while adapting to include various forms of modern betting, such as daily fantasy sports like Prize Picks.

The United states current tax structure for wagering varies depending on the legality of the activity. The guidelines under IRS Form 730, Tax on Wagering, is used to compute excise taxes for legal and illegal wagers of certain types. While state-authorized wagers are taxed at 0.25%, illegal gambling is subject to a higher tax of 2% to dissuade unregulated wagering. In addition, the IRS holds an occupational tax of $50 for each principal or agent accepting wagers for legal wagers and an annual occupational tax of $500 for illegal wagering agents. With the growth of modern betting platforms such as daily fantasy sports, the application of excise taxes has expanded to cover these new forms of gambling.

== Economic impact on revenue collection, providers, and consumers ==
=== Economic impact ===
In 2024, the treasury inspector general for tax administration (TIGTA) reported that non-filers were associated with over 13 billion dollars in total gambling winnings. These unreported gambling winnings represent approximately 1.4 billion dollars in potentially uncollected excise tax revenue. As the gambling industry grows, the IRS aims to enforce excise tax compliance more rigorously to minimize revenue loss and enhance funding for government initiatives.

=== Current collection issues ===
While most wagering is performed through regulated websites and casinos, a large portion is done through illegal bookies and offshore sites. The American Gaming Association (AGA) estimates that nearly 40 percent of the U.S. sports betting market operates through illicit channels, generating around $44.2 billion in unregulated revenue annually, translating to almost $13.3 billion in estimated state tax losses.

Additionally, due to lost excise tax revenue, there is severe complexity in compliance due to different games and types of wagers needing different tiers of taxation. This complexity can often lead to errors in calculating the excise tax or, in some instances, complete non-compliance. Gambling laws in other states and countries create a consistent stream of difficulty for authorities to maneuver when exercising tax law.

=== Impact on providers ===
For providers, these excise taxes mean increased costs and reduced profit margins due to the portion of the profits being used to cover the revenue. There is potential for reduced demand if excise taxes are raised for higher taxes, which may deter participants. These excise taxes also create pressure in the competitive landscape of providers, as players may travel to different jurisdictions for lower taxes. Furthermore, unregulated online gambling sites may be seen as favorable, pulling users from the regulated and taxed system.

=== Impact on consumers ===
Consumers are impacted in multiple ways as gambling activities become more expensive. Since some people, especially casual players, find gambling more expensive, higher fees may result in lower participation. Spending patterns may change as a result, with customers shifting their disposable income to alternative entertainment options. Price hikes have varying effects on problem gamblers. Increased expenses might deter some people from gambling as much, but others might react by taking on riskier activities or trying to make up lost money by spending more. Price increases can also make gambling seem less valuable, which could lower consumer satisfaction and general welfare, especially if people feel pressured to keep playing despite the higher costs.

== See also ==
- Cigarette taxes in the United States
