= World Sports Exchange =

Online bookmaker

World Sports Exchange (also known as WSEX) was an online bookmaker offering sportsbook gambling odds and sportsbook wagering lines including, football lines, basketball odds, baseball parlays, hockey odds, and horse racing track odds. Established in 1995, it was one of the pioneers of internet gaming. The company also used to run the World Poker Exchange, an online poker cardroom. That operation ended on February 15, 2012.

In 2000, former owner Jay S. Cohen was prosecuted by the United States government for violating the Federal Wire Act.

On April 19, 2013, World Sports Exchange ceased operations and posted a message at wsex.com stating: "We have been forced to halt business activities at this time due to inadequate capital resources."

Also on April 19, 2013, co-founder Steve Schillinger is believed to have died by suicide by gunshot at his home in Antigua. His body was discovered by neighbors. He was 60 years old.
