= Nigel Payne =

British business executive (born 1960)

- Born: March 1960 (age 65)
- Occupation: Business Executive

Nigel Payne (born March 1960) is a British business executive.

== Career ==
He is currently the chairman of LSE Main Market Braemar plc, the Chairman of private company Green Man Gaming limited, a non-executive director of AIM listed GetBusy plc, a non-executive director of ASX listed Betr Entertainment and JSE listed Sun International.

From 2000 to 2006 Nigel Payne was the CEO of AIM Listed Sportingbet Plc, one of the largest Internet gambling businesses in the world, leading the business at its peak to a market value of £2 billion. He was a finalist at the Sunday Times Non Executive Director of the Year Awards in April 2016. Nigel Payne was also an adviser to President Clinton's Foundation from 2006 to 2008.

== Career at Sportingbet ==
Payne joined Sportingbet in 2000 as group finance director and was appointed group chief executive the following year. He held this post through 2006, guiding the company through numerous acquisitions and a listing on the London Stock Exchange. At its peak, Sportingbet was valued at just under £2 billion. Payne stepped down as its chief executive in October 2006 and was succeeded by Andrew McIver. Payne continued to be a non-executive director at Sportingbet, focusing on industry regulation and legal issues.

Since November 2006 Nigel Payne acts as a non-executive director to many listed and private businesses as well as being an independent gaming consultant.

A native of the United Kingdom, Payne has long been an outspoken critic of bans on online gambling. He appeared on 60 Minutes. He remains an ardent supporter of legalisation and regulation of the industry.
