= Gaming Act 1845 =

Act of the Parliament of the United Kingdom

Gaming Act 1845 (Note: The citation of this act by this short title was authorised by section 1 of, and the first schedule to, the Short Titles Act 1896. Due to the repeal of those provisions, it is now authorised by section 19(2) of the Interpretation Act 1978.)
- Act of Parliament
- Parliament of the United Kingdom
- Long title: An Act to amend the Law concerning Games and Wagers.
- Citation: 8 & 9 Vict. c. 109
- Territorial extent: United Kingdom

Dates
- Royal assent: 8 August 1845
- Commencement: 8 August 1845 (Note: The Acts of Parliament (Commencement) Act 1793.)
- Repealed: 1 September 2007 (Note: The Gambling Act 2005 (Commencement No. 6 and Transitional Provisions) Order 2006 (SI 2006/3272).)
Other legislation
Repeals/revokes	Gaming Act 1664
Amended by	Statute Law Revision Act 1875; Civil Procedure Acts Repeal Act 1879; Statute Law Revision and Civil Procedure Act 1883; Summary Jurisdiction Act 1884; Betting and Gaming Act 1960; Billiards (Abolition of Restrictions) Act 1987; Theft Act 1968
Repealed by	Gambling Act 2005
Relates to	Gaming Act 1892

Status: Repealed

Text of statute as originally enacted

Revised text of statute as amended

The Gaming Act 1845 (8 & 9 Vict. c. 109) was an act of the Parliament of the United Kingdom. The act's principal provision was to deem a wager unenforceable as a legal contract. The act received royal assent on 8 August 1845. Sections 17 and 18, though amended, remained in force until 1 September 2007.

== Background ==
Increasing concern as to the damaging social effects of gambling gave rise to a select committee of the House of Commons whose recommendations were implemented by the act. The policy of the act was to discourage betting.

However, following a 2001 report by Sir Alan Budd, in 2002, the UK government accepted that wagers should cease to be unenforceable as contracts, seeking to introduce a new liberalised regulatory regime in order to encourage the gambling industry.

== Subsequent developments ==
Sections 1 to 9 and 15 and 16 and 19 to 24 and 26, and the first and second schedules, were repealed by art I of schedule 6 to the Betting and Gaming Act 1960 (8 & 9 Eliz. 2. c. 60).

Section 25 of the act was repealed by section 1(1) of, and part XIX of schedule 1 to, the Statute Law (Repeals) Act 1976, which came into force on 27 May 1976.

Sections 10 to 14 and the third schedule were repealed by section 1 of, and the schedule to, the Billiards (Abolition of Restrictions) Act 1987

The whole act was repealed for Northern Ireland by article 187(4) of, and schedule 21 to, the Betting, Gaming, Lotteries and Amusements (Northern Ireland) Order 1985 (S.I. 1985/1204 (N.I. 11)).

The whole act was repealed in the Republic of Ireland by the Gaming and Lotteries Act 1956.

== Exclusion ==
The act was excluded by section 16(4) of the Gaming Act 1968.

== Section 1 – Repeal of part of the Unlawful Games Act 1541 ==
Section 1 repealed the Unlawful Games Act 1541 (33 Hen. 8. c. 9), as to so much

- whereby any game of mere skill, such as bowling, coyting, cloyshcayls, half bowl, tennis or the like, was declared an unlawful game,
- which enacted any penalty for playing at any such game of skill as aforesaid,
- which enacts any penalty for lacking bows or arrows, or for not making and continuing butts,
- which regulates the making, selling, or using of bows and arrows,
- requires the mayors, sheriffs, bailiffs, constables, and other head officers within every city, borough, and town within the Realm, to make search weekly, or at the farthest once a month, in all places where houses, alleys, plays, or places of dicing, carding, or gaming shall be suspected to be had, kept, and maintained,
- as makes it lawful for every master to license his or their servants, and for every nobleman and other having manors, lands, tenements, or other yearly profits for term of life, in his own right or in his wife's right, to the yearly value of an hundred pounds or above, to command, appoint, or license, by his or their discretion, his or their servants or family of his or their house or houses to play at cards, dice, or tables, or any unlawful game.

It provides such commandment, appointment, or licence shall not avail any person to exempt him from the danger or penalty of playing at any unlawful game or in any common gaming house.

== Section 15 – Repeal of other laws ==
Section 15 of the act repealed the following:

- Gaming Act 1664 (16 Cha. 2. c. 7)
- Gaming Act 1710 (9 Ann. c. 19) as was not amended by Gaming Act 1835 (5 & 6 Will. 4. c. 41)
- Gaming Act 1744 (18 Geo. 2. c. 34)

- as relates to Gaming Act 1710 (9 Ann. c. 19) and
- as renders any person liable to be indicted and punished for winning or losing, at play or by betting, at any one time, the sum or value of ten pounds, or within the space of twenty-four hours the sum or value of twenty pounds.

== Section 17 – Cheating at play ==
Section 17 of the act created an offence. At the time of its repeal this section read:

... every person who shall, by any fraud or unlawful device or ill practice in playing at or with cards, dice, tables, or other game, or in bearing a part in the stakes, wages, or adventures, or in betting on the sides or hands of them that do play, or in wagering on the event of any game, sport, pastime, or exercise, win from any other person to himself, or any other or others, any sum of money or valuable thing, shall—

- [(a) on conviction on indictment be liable to imprisonment for a term not exceeding two years; or
- (b) on summary conviction be liable to imprisonment for a term not exceeding six months or to a fine not exceeding two hundred pounds or to both.]

The words of enactment at the start were repealed by the Statute Law Revision Act 1891.

The words in square brackets were substituted for the words "be deemed guilty of obtaining such money or valuable thing from such other person by a false pretence, with intent to cheat or defraud such person of the same, and, being convicted thereof, shall be punished accordingly" by sections 33(2) and 36(3) of, and Part III of Schedule 2 to, the Theft Act 1968.

=== Two hundred pounds ===
Section 32(2) of the Magistrates' Courts Act 1980 provided that the reference to two hundred pounds was to be construed as a reference to the prescribed sum.

The following cases are relevant:

- R v Darley (1826) 1 Stark NP 359, (1826) 171 ER 497
- Cooke v Stratford (1844) 13 M & W 379, (1844) 2 Dow & L 399, (1844) 4 LT (OS) 138a
- R v Hudson (1860) Bell CC 263
- R v O'Connor and Brown (1881) 45 LT 512, (1881) 46 JP 214, (1881) 15 Cox 3
- R v Moore, 10 Cr App R 54, CCA
- R v Lawler, 14 JP 561
- R v Governor of Brixton Prison, ex parte Sjoland and Metzler [1912] 3 KB 568, 29 TLR 10, 77 JP 23
- R v Leon [1945] KB 136, 30 Cr App R 120, 61 TLR 100, CCA
- R v Butler, 38 Cr App R 57, CCA
- R v Clucas and O'Rourke [1959] 1 WLR 244, [1959] 1 All ER 438, 43 Cr App R 98, 123 JP 203, CCA
- R v Harris and Turner [1963] 2 QB 442, [1963] 2 WLR 851, [1963] 2 All ER 294, 47 Cr App R 125, CCA

In 2005, Kwong Lee, Martin Fitz and Shuhal Miah were found guilty of cheating at roulette under this section.

== Section 18 – Gambling contracts deemed void ==
Section 18 of the act concerned whether unpaid winnings accrued from gambling could be sued for in a court of law. The act made it clear that they could not because winnings from gambling were to be treated as a "debt of honour" and as such could not be treated as a financial debt. The act read:

All contracts or agreements, whether by parole or in writing, by way of gaming or wagering, shall be null and void; and no suit shall be brought or maintained in any court of law and equity for recovering any sum of money or valuable thing alleged to be won upon any wager, or which shall have been deposited in the hands of any person to abide the event on which any wager shall have been made: Provided always, that this enactment shall not be deemed to apply to any subscription or contribution, or agreement to subscribe or contribute, for or towards any plate, prize, or sum of money to be awarded to the winner or winners of any lawful game, sport, pastime, or exercise.

This section was extended by the Gaming Act 1892 (55 & 56 Vict. c. 9).

However, a bet on the Horserace Totalisator Board, also known as The Tote, did not fall within the scope of the act.

Further, by the 1980s, it was feared that complex commercial risk management instruments and contracts, such as derivatives could fall foul of the act. Provision was made in the Financial Services Act 1986 that a contract would not be void if at least one of the parties entered into it for legitimate business purposes. The exemption is now found in the Financial Services and Markets Act 2000 s 412, but due to the repeal of the 1845 act, it now only has effect in Northern Ireland (against the Betting, Gaming, Lotteries and Amusements (Northern Ireland) Order 1985).

The Gambling Act 2005 removed the "debt of honour" clause that made gambling winnings exempt from legal action if they were not paid. This meant that unpaid winnings could now be pursued in a court of law.

== Section 19 – Feigned issues abolished ==
Court of law or equity that desired to have any question of fact decided by a jury had it presented in the form of feigned issues, by stating that a wager was laid between two parties interested in respectively maintaining the affirmative and the negative of certain propositions. It was enacted that in every case where any court of law or equity desires to have any question of fact decided by a jury it should the directly state the question of fact in dispute, with such persons being plaintiffs and defendants as the court may direct, rather than as a feigned issue of a wager.

== Ireland and Northern Ireland ==
The act was in force in Ireland until partition. It consequently became the law of the Irish Free State on 6 December 1922, and then of its successor states until its repeal in 1956. When the autonomous region of Northern Ireland seceded from the Irish Free State and rejoined the United Kingdom on 7 December 1922, the act became the law of Northern Ireland until repeal.

== Cases ==
- Close v Wilson [2011] EWCA Civ 5, a promise to money paid under an agreement to bet cannot be enforced because of the Gaming Act 1892 s 1, but the payer has a claim in restitution for the winnings and for any money used for purposes other than betting.

== See also ==
- History of gambling in the United Kingdom

== Bibliography ==
- Birley, D. (1993). Sport and the Making of Britain. Manchester: Manchester University Press. pp. p.204. ISBN 071903759X. (Google Books)
- Budd, A (2001) Gambling Review Report, Department for Culture, Media and Sport
- Gambling Review (2002) A Safe Bet for Success Cm.5397
- House of Commons (1844) Report from the Select Committee on Gaming HC1844/297
- Miers, D. (2004). Regulating Commercial Gambling: Past, Present, and Future. London: Oxford University Press. ISBN 0199276153.
- Smith, C.; Monckom, S. (2001). Smith and Monckom's The Law of Betting, Gaming and Lotteries. London: LexisNexis. ISBN 0406903131.
