= United Kingdom partnership law =

United Kingdom partnership law concerns the way that partnerships are formed or governed within the United Kingdom. Depending upon where the partnership was formed, English law, Scots law or Northern Irish law may apply in addition to statutes that create a framework across the UK. Under Scots law, a partnership is a distinct legal entity and can borrow money from a bank in the name of the partnership, while English law only allows borrowing in the names of individual partners. Partnerships are a form of business association which arises automatically when people carry on business with a view to a profit (Partnership Act 1890 s 1). Partners are jointly and severally liable, just as they own the property in common.

== History ==
A limited partnership under the Limited Partnerships Act 1907 is similar to a partnership under the Partnership Act 1890, although there are two different types of partners: general partners and limited partners. A general partner is treated in the same way as a partner under the Partnership Act 1890 and is liable for the debts and obligations of the firm. A limited partner, unlike a general partner, enjoys limited liability, meaning that, provided they do not partake in any business management, they will not be liable for any debts or obligations beyond their investments. If a limited partner does partake in business management, they will be treated as if they were a general partner, and will be liable for the debts and obligations of the firm incurred under their management. A limited partnership must be registered with Companies House in order to be treated as a limited partnership; if unregistered, it will be treated as a partnership.

A limited liability partnership (LLP) under the Limited Liability Partnerships Act 2000 is a legal person in its own right, and is distinct from the persons who own it (who are formally known as 'members', but often referred to as 'partners'). Generally, members enjoy limited liability, meaning they are not responsible for an LLP's debts or obligations. To be incorporated, a limited liability partnership must, inter alia, have at least two members. Generally, the law governing partnerships within the meaning of the Partnership Act 1890 and the Limited Partnerships Act 1907 does not apply to limited liability partnerships. A notable exception to this, however, is in the respect of taxation: LLPs are treated as partnerships for tax purposes.

In 2017, measures were introduced to make almost all UK companies identify their beneficial owners. This did not apply to partnerships in England, which resulted in a doubling of new partnership registrations, many presumably by owners who did not want such disclosure. A quarter of the 4,500 new partnerships in England from 2017 to 2021 were created by five UK-based agents.

== Common law ==
Partnerships were a common law phenomenon, dating back to the Roman law institution of a societas universorum quae ex quaestu veniunt, or a trade partnership.

- Waugh v Carver (1793) 126 ER 525, 2 HBI 235, held that receipt of profits of partnership made the recipient a partner. John George Phillimore later opined that this was 'one indeed of the most absurd decisions ever come to by a court of law'.

== Statutes ==
=== Partnership Act 1890 ===
Section one of the 1890 Act defines partnership as ‘the relationship which subsists between persons carrying on a business in common with a view of profit.’ This can come about by oral agreement, written document or conduct. The minimum membership is two, and the maximum since 2002 is unlimited. The provisions of the Partnership Act 1890 apply unless expressly or impliedly excluded by agreement of the partners. Each partner is entitled to participate in management, get an equal share of profit, an indemnity in respect of liabilities assumed in the course of business, and the right not to be expelled by other partners. A partnership ends on the death of a partner. A partner is jointly and severally liable for the debts of the others; there is no limited liability.

=== Limited Partnerships Act 1907 ===
Only sleeping partners may have limited liability, and it must consist of at least one general partner and one limited partner.

=== Limited Liability Partnerships Act 2000 ===
Under the 2000 Act, such partnerships are deemed to have legal personality. It allows limited liability for general trading debts, but individual partners cannot limit personal liability for negligence. It was introduced to allow some protection against large negligence actions, where the risks were felt to be excessive.

On 1 October 2008, section 1,286 of the Companies Act 2006 extended the Limited Liability Partnerships Act 2000 to Northern Ireland, and repealed the Limited Liability Partnerships Act (Northern Ireland) 2002, an act of the Northern Ireland Assembly which before that date was the principal statute concerning LLPs in Northern Ireland.

== Quasi-partnerships ==
Under the law of England and Wales, a quasi-partnership is a legal creation brought about where the court needs to treat several shareholders of a company as mutually bound to each other to a greater extent than would generally be expected of such shareholders under company legislation. Sections 459-461 of the Companies Act 1985, replaced by Part 30 (sections 994–999) of the Companies Act 2006, refer to the objective of protecting company members against "unfair prejudice".

Where a company is a quasi-partnership at a time when it is being valued, especially for purposes of winding-up, the courts would expect the valuation to disregard the discount normally applied to a minority shareholding, which reflects the fact that a minority owner does not have the power to direct the affairs of the business. The courts in England and Wales "have repeatedly emphasised that the overriding requirement in quasi-partnership cases is that the price to be paid, where a buy-out order is made, should be fair".

== See also ==
- United Kingdom company law
- Limited partnerships in England and Wales
- Limited Liability Partnerships Act 2000
- Limited Liability Partnerships Act (Northern Ireland) 2002
