= List of acts of the Northern Ireland Assembly from 2002 =

This is a list of acts of the Northern Ireland Assembly passed in 2002. Acts of the Northern Ireland Assembly are enacted by the Northern Ireland Assembly, which has legislative authority over devolved matters in relation to Northern Ireland under the authority of the Northern Ireland Act 1998. Acts are cited by calendar year, in the same fashion as acts of Parliament of the United Kingdom. Each act passed in a respective year is given a chapter number (abbreviated "c.") denoted by Arabic numerals, and citations are usually followed by the suffix "(N.I.)" so as to prevent confusion with acts of Parliament of the United Kingdom.

14 acts of the Northern Ireland Assembly were passed in 2002.

indicates that an act has been transcribed on Wikisource, indicates that an act is available to view at legislation.gov.uk, and indicates the location of the original act in the Parliamentary Archives.

== Acts of the Northern Ireland Assembly ==
Short title	Citation	Royal assent
Long title
Industrial Development Act (Northern Ireland) 2002	2002 c. 1 (N.I.)	7 February 2002
An Act to establish Invest Northern Ireland to exercise certain existing functions in relation to industrial development; to dissolve the Industrial Development Board for Northern Ireland, the Local Enterprise Development Unit and the Industrial Research and Technology Unit; to abolish certain functions of the Northern Ireland Tourist Board; to amend the Industrial Development (Northern Ireland) Order 1982; (Note: Industrial Development (Northern Ireland) Order 1982 (SI 1982/1083)) and for related purposes.
Game Preservation (Amendment) Act (Northern Ireland) 2002	2002 c. 2 (N.I.)	13 February 2002
An Act to amend the Game Preservation Act (Northern Ireland) 1928; (Note: Game Preservation Act (Northern Ireland) 1928 (18 & 19 Geo. 5. c. 25 (N.I.))) and to amend the law relating to the killing, taking or destroying of rabbits and hares.
Budget Act (Northern Ireland) 2002	2002 c. 3 (N.I.)	20 March 2002
An Act to authorise the issue out of the Consolidated Fund of certain sums for the service of the years ending 31st March 2002 and 2003; to appropriate those sums for specified purposes; to authorise the Department of Finance and Personnel to borrow on the credit of the appropriated sums; to authorise the use for the public service of certain resources for the years ending 31st March 2002 and 2003; and to revise the limits on the use of certain accruing resources in the year ending 31st March 2002.
Local Government (Best Value) Act (Northern Ireland) 2002 (repealed)	2002 c. 4 (N.I.)	26 March 2002
An Act to make provision placing on district councils a general duty to make arrangements for continuous improvement in the way in which their functions are exercised; and for connected purposes. (Repealed by Local Government Act (Northern Ireland) 2014 (c. 8 (N.I.))
Personal Social Services (Preserved Rights) Act (Northern Ireland) 2002	2002 c. 5 (N.I.)	26 March 2002
An Act to make provision in relation to persons in residential accommodation with preserved rights under the Income Support (General) Regulations (Northern Ireland) 1987; (Note: Income Support (General) Regulations (Northern Ireland) 1987 (SR(NI) 1987/459))) and for connected purposes.
Carers and Direct Payments Act (Northern Ireland) 2002	2002 c. 6 (N.I.)	2 May 2002
An Act to make provision about the assessment of carers' needs; to provide for services to help carers; to provide for the making of direct payments to persons in lieu of the provision of personal social services or carers' services; and for connected purposes.
Budget (No. 2) Act (Northern Ireland) 2002	2002 c. 7 (N.I.)	12 August 2002
An Act to authorise the issue out of the Consolidated Fund of certain sums for the service of the year ending 31st March 2003; to appropriate those sums for specified purposes; to authorise the Department of Finance and Personnel to borrow on the credit of the appropriated sums; to authorise the use for the public service of certain resources (including accruing resources) for the year ending 31st March 2003; and to repeal certain spent enactments.
Railway Safety Act (Northern Ireland) 2002	2002 c. 8 (N.I.)	13 August 2002
An Act to make provision with respect to the safety of railways.
Health and Personal Social Services Act (Northern Ireland) 2002	2002 c. 9 (N.I.)	4 October 2002
An Act to amend the Health and Personal Social Services (Northern Ireland) Order 1972 (Note: Health and Personal Social Services (Northern Ireland) Order 1972 (SI 1972/1265)) in relation to charges for nursing care in residential accommodation; to provide for the establishment and functions of the Northern Ireland Practice and Education Council for Nursing and Midwifery; and for connected purposes.
Social Security Act (Northern Ireland) 2002	2002 c. 10 (N.I.)	17 October 2002
An Act to amend the law relating to statutory maternity pay; to amend the law relating to maternity allowance; to make provision for work-focused interviews for partners of benefit claimants; to make provision about the use of information for, or relating to, employment and training; to amend the Deregulation and Contracting Out (Northern Ireland) Order 1996; (Note: Deregulation and Contracting Out (Northern Ireland) Order 1996 (SI 1996/1632)) and for connected purposes.
Children (Leaving Care) Act (Northern Ireland) 2002	2002 c. 11 (N.I.)	22 November 2002
An Act to make provision about children and young persons who are being, or have been, looked after by an authority within the meaning of the Children (Northern Ireland) Order 1995; (Note: Children (Northern Ireland) Order 1995 (SI 1995/755)) to replace Article 35 of that Order; and for connected purposes.
Limited Liability Partnerships Act (Northern Ireland) 2002 (repealed)	2002 c. 12 (N.I.)	22 November 2002
An Act to make provision for limited liability partnerships. (Repealed by Companies Act 2006 (c. 46))
Open-Ended Investment Companies Act (Northern Ireland) 2002 (repealed)	2002 c. 13 (N.I.)	22 November 2002
An Act to make provision for facilitating the carrying on of collective investment by means of open-ended investment companies and for regulating such companies. (Repealed by Companies Act 2006 (c. 46))
State Pension Credit Act (Northern Ireland) 2002	2002 c. 14 (N.I.)	22 November 2002
An Act to make provision for and in connection with a new social security benefit called state pension credit; and to amend section 43(1) of the Pension Schemes (Northern Ireland) Act 1993. (Note: Pension Schemes (Northern Ireland) Act 1993 (c. 49))
