= Scottish limited partnership =

A Scottish limited partnership (SLP) is a form of limited partnership registered under Scots law. SLPs have features that give them advantages as investment vehicles and have been criticised for having inadequate anti-money laundering rules. Unlike other UK limited partnerships, SLPs have legal personality, which allows them to hold assets and enter into contracts in their own right.

== History ==
SLPs are governed by the Partnership Act 1890 and the Limited Partnerships Act 1907.

Prior to 2017, the ownership of SLPs was not disclosed in company filings. On 26 June 2017 regulatory changes required that SLPs disclose persons with significant control to Companies House. Changes to the regulations were followed by a significant drop in the number of newly registered SLPs.

== Illicit use ==
SLPs have been used to launder proceeds from criminal activities worldwide, including the proceeds of a $1 billion heist of major Moldovan banks.

According to Transparency International, “these superficial companies have enabled theft, bribery and organised crime to thrive around the world under the veneer of a legitimate UK enterprise”.

The investigative website Bellingcat "found SLPs trading in high-risk money laundering areas, operating unregulated trading and gambling websites, a large proportion of identifiable SLPs in business as trade intermediaries... SLPs appearing in the Ukrainian criminal courts, generic websites with no clear details of their trading activities... SLPs for sale online as shelf companies, SLPs involved in political lobbying, and others more directly involved in large scale criminal activity".

== Popularity ==
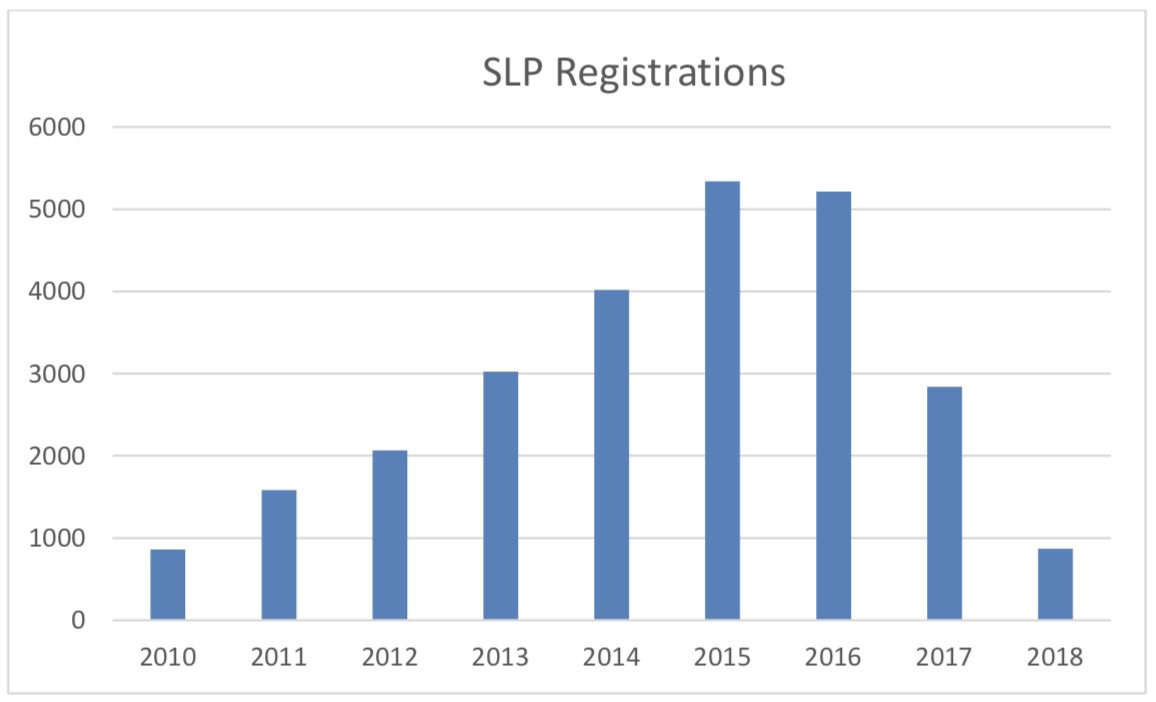
Chart of new registrations of SLFs produced by Bellingcat for their investigation into SLPs.

SLPs sharply increased in popularity between 2016 and 2017, with a 430% increase in registrations in that time.

They are reportedly popular vehicles for money laundering for criminals from the former Soviet bloc. Due to possessing distinct legal personalities, SLPs have been used as investment vehicles in Lloyd's of London since 1997.

The requirement to file persons-with-significant-control documents from 2017 led to a large drop in the number of new registrations. This requirement did not apply to partnerships in England resulted in an about a doubling of new partnership registrations there.

== Criticism ==
Transparency International UK policy director Duncan Hames has criticised SLPs, stating that "money launderers have been attracted to them because of the secrecy and the veneer of legitimacy they offer". MP Alison Thewliss described their reported abuse as "an issue of significant concern for the UK Government and the authorities".
