= Unlawful Games Act 1728 =

Act of the Parliament of Great Britain

- Act of Parliament
- Parliament of Great Britain
- Long title: An Act to revive the Laws therein mentioned, relating to the Importation of Foreign Brandy, and other Waters and Spirits; for Importation of Cochineal; to continue several Acts for preventing Frauds in the Customs; for Encouragement of the Silk Manufactures of this Kingdom; for making Copper Ore of the British Plantations an enumerated Commodity; for making perpetual an Act therein mentioned, for suppressing of Piracy; for enabling Persons prosecuted upon the Capias, in relation to the Running of Goods, to defend in Forma Pauperis; for more effectual debarring of unlawful Games; for licensing Retailers of Brandy and other distilled Liquors; and for better Regulation of Licenses for Common Inns and Alehouses.
- Citation: 2 Geo. 2. c. 28
- Territorial extent: Great Britain

Dates
- Royal assent: 14 May 1729
- Commencement: 21 January 1729 (Note: Start of session.)
- Repealed: 1 May 1961 (Note: The Betting and Gaming Act, 1960 (Commencement No. 1) Order 1960.)
Other legislation
Amends	See § Revived and continued enactments
Repealed by	Betting and Gaming Act 1960
Relates to	Lotteries Act 1710; Gaming Act 1738; Gaming Act 1739; Gaming Act 1744; See Expiring laws continuance acts

Status: Repealed

Text of statute as originally enacted

The Unlawful Games Act 1728 (2 Geo. 2. c. 28) was an act of the Parliament of Great Britain that revived, continued and made perpetual various older acts.

== Background ==
In the United Kingdom, acts of Parliament remain in force until expressly repealed. Many acts of parliament, however, contained time-limited sunset clauses, requiring legislation to revive enactments that had expired or to continue enactments that would otherwise expire.

== Provisions ==
=== Revived and continued enactments ===
Section 1 of the act revived and continued the Adulteration of Coffee Act 1718 (5 Geo. 1. c. 11) as relates to the "importation of foreign brandy, arrack, rum, strong waters or spirits, in any ship, vessel or boat, under the burden of fifteen tuns" from 1 May 1729 until the end of the next session of parliament after 29 September 1734.

Section 2 of the act revived and continued the Importation (No. 2) Act 1726 (13 Geo. 1. c. 25) from 1 May 1729 until the end of the next session of parliament after 1 May 1730.

Section 3 of the act continued the Adulteration of Coffee Act 1718 (5 Geo. 1. c. 11) as relates to "such foreign goods, wares and merchandizes as shall be taken in at sea, out of any ship or vessel, in order to be landed, or put into any other ship, vessel or boat, and also relating to goods not reported, and found after clearing ships, and whereby further remedies are provided against goods shipped out for parts beyond the seas; and also relating to the opening or altering the package of goods on board ships outward bound; and also relating to hovering ships or vessels of the burthen of fifty tuns or under; and also concerning the bales or package in which coffee shall be exported; and also relating to rum imported in calks or vessels not containing twenty gallons at the least; and also relating to certificate goods entered in order to be exported to Ireland", as continued by the Continuance of Laws Act 1722 (9 Geo. 1. c. 8), until the end of the next session of parliament after 29 September 1734.

Section 4 of the act continued the Silk Subsidies, Various Duties, Import of Furs, etc. Act 1721 (8 Geo. 1. c. 15) as relates to the encouragement of the silk manufactures of the kingdom, as continued by the Continuance of Laws, etc. Act 1724 (11 Geo. 1. c. 29), from the expiration of the act until the end of the next session of parliament after 29 September 1734.

Section 5 of the act continued the last two clauses of the Continuance of Laws Act 1722 (9 Geo. 1. c. 8) until the end of the next session of parliament after 29 September 1734.

Section 6 of the act continued the Customs, etc. Act 1721 (8 Geo. 1. c. 18), as continued by the Continuance of Laws, etc. Act 1724 (11 Geo. 1. c. ) except so much as relates to ships or vessels performing quarantine, from the expiration of the act until the end of the next session of parliament after 29 September 1734.

Section 7 of the act made the Piracy Act 1721 (8 Geo. 1. c. 24) perpetual.

Section 8 of the act provided that people arrested under customs cases could defend themselves in forma pauperis if they swore they were worth less than five pounds besides their clothing, allowing judges to assign them free legal counsel, attorneys, and clerks to assist with their defence.

Section 9 of the act amended the Unlawful Games Act 1541 (33 Hen. 8. c. 9) (Note: The margin note incorrect cites this as "23 Hen. 8. c. 9".), providing that justices of the peace could commit persons to prison without bail who were proven by two credible witnesses to have played unlawful games, until they provided recognisance with sureties promising to cease such activities.

Section 10 of the act provided that after 24 June 1729, only licensed persons could sell brandy or distilled liquors by retail for consumption on premises, with retailers being subject to the same rules, penalties, and forfeitures as common alehouse keepers, under the same jurisdiction of justices of the peace.

Section 11 of the act provided that after 24 June 1729, licenses for inns, alehouses, or retail liquor establishments could only be granted at general meetings of justices for the division where the applicant resides, held annually on September 1 or within twenty days after, with any licenses granted contrary to this provision being null and void.

Section 12 of the act provided that existing licenses would remain valid until 1 September 1730, without requiring renewal at the September 1729 sessions, and that the act would not alter licensing methods in cities or incorporated towns.

== Legacy ==
The Select Committee on Temporary Laws, Expired or Expiring, appointed in 1796, inspected and considered all temporary laws, observing irregularities in the construction of expiring laws continuance acts, making recommendations and emphasising the importance of the Committee for Expired and Expiring Laws.

The whole act was repealed by section 15, and the part I of the sixth schedule to, the Betting and Gaming Act 1960 (8 & 9 Eliz. 2. c. 60).
