= List of acts of the Parliament of Great Britain from 1744 =

This is a complete list of acts of the Parliament of Great Britain for the year 1744.

For acts passed until 1707, see the list of acts of the Parliament of England and the list of acts of the Parliament of Scotland. See also the list of acts of the Parliament of Ireland.

For acts passed from 1801 onwards, see the list of acts of the Parliament of the United Kingdom. For acts of the devolved parliaments and assemblies in the United Kingdom, see the list of acts of the Scottish Parliament, the list of acts of the Northern Ireland Assembly, and the list of acts and measures of Senedd Cymru; see also the list of acts of the Parliament of Northern Ireland.

The number shown after each act's title is its chapter number. Acts are cited using this number, preceded by the year(s) of the reign during which the relevant parliamentary session was held; thus the Union with Ireland Act 1800 is cited as "39 & 40 Geo. 3. c. 67", meaning the 67th act passed during the session that started in the 39th year of the reign of George III and which finished in the 40th year of that reign. Note that the modern convention is to use Arabic numerals in citations (thus "41 Geo. 3" rather than "41 Geo. III"). Acts of the last session of the Parliament of Great Britain and the first session of the Parliament of the United Kingdom are both cited as "41 Geo. 3".

Acts passed by the Parliament of Great Britain did not have a short title; however, some of these acts have subsequently been given a short title by acts of the Parliament of the United Kingdom (such as the Short Titles Act 1896).

Before the Acts of Parliament (Commencement) Act 1793 came into force on 8 April 1793, acts passed by the Parliament of Great Britain were deemed to have come into effect on the first day of the session in which they were passed. Because of this, the years given in the list below may in fact be the year before a particular act was passed.

== 18 Geo. 2 ==
The fourth session of the 9th Parliament of Great Britain, which met from 27 November 1744 until 2 May 1745.

This session was also traditionally cited as 18 G. 2.

=== Public acts ===
Short title	Citation	Royal assent
Long title
Land Tax Act 1744 (repealed)	18 Geo. 2. c. 1	20 December 1744
An Act for granting an Aid to His Majesty, by a Land Tax, to be raised in Great Britain, for the Service of the Year One Thousand Seven Hundred and Forty-five. (Repealed by Statute Law Revision Act 1867 (30 & 31 Vict. c. 59))
Taxation Act 1744 (repealed)	18 Geo. 2. c. 2	14 February 1745
An Act for continuing the Duties on Malt, Mum, Cyder, and Perry, in that Part of Great Britain called England; and for granting to His Majesty certain Duties upon Malt, Mum, Cyder, and Perry, in that Part of Great Britain called Scotland; for the Service of the Year One Thousand Seven Hundred and Forty-five. (Repealed by Statute Law Revision Act 1867 (30 & 31 Vict. c. 59))
Saint Margaret's Church, King's Lynn Act 1744	18 Geo. 2. c. 3	14 February 1745
An Act to enable the Parishioners of the Parish of Saint Margaret, within the Borough of King's Lynn, in the County of Norfolk, to raise Money, by Rates upon themselves, for finishing the Church of the said Parish.
Kingston-upon-Hull Roads Act 1744 (repealed)	18 Geo. 2. c. 4	14 February 1745
An Act for repairing the Road leading from the Town of Kingston upon Hull to and through the Town of Anlaby, and from thence to the Town of Kirk-Ella, in the County of the said Town of Kingston upon Hull. (Repealed by Road from Kingston-upon-Hull to Kirk Ella Act 1829 (10 Geo. 4. c. xcii))
Salt Duties Act 1744 (repealed)	18 Geo. 2. c. 5	19 March 1745
An Act for granting and continuing the Duties upon Salt, and Red and White Herrings, for the further Term of Six Years; and for declaring, that the Duties on Salt, which arise and are payable in that Part of Great Britain called Scotland, shall be subject to the same Charges thereon, as the same Duties were liable to by the Act of the Fifth Year of the Reign of His late Majesty King George the First. (Note: Salt Duties Act 1718 (5 Geo. 1. c. 18)) (Repealed by Statute Law Revision Act 1867 (30 & 31 Vict. c. 59))
Hedon and Hull Road Act 1744 (repealed)	18 Geo. 2. c. 6	19 March 1745
An Act for repairing the Road leading from a Gate, commonly called Sacred Gate, on the South East Side of the Town of Hedon, in the East Riding of the County of York, through the said Town, to Hull North Bridge. (Repealed by Hendon and Hull and Wyton and Flinton Turnpike Roads Act 1855 (18 & 19 Vict. c. cxxxvi))
Mutiny Act 1744 (repealed)	18 Geo. 2. c. 7	19 March 1745
An Act for punishing Mutiny and Desertion, and for the better Payment of the Army and their Quarters. (Repealed by Statute Law Revision Act 1867 (30 & 31 Vict. c. 59))
Boroughbridge and Durham Road Act 1744 (repealed)	18 Geo. 2. c. 8	19 March 1745
An Act for repairing the High Road leading from Boroughbridge, in the County of York, through North-Allerton, in the same County, to Croft Bridge, on the River Tees, and from thence through Darlington, in the County of Durham, to the City of Durham. (Repealed by Boroughbridge and Durham Road Act 1792 (32 Geo. 3. c. 118))
National Debt Act 1744 (repealed)	18 Geo. 2. c. 9	19 March 1745
An Act for granting to His Majesty several additional Duties upon all Wines imported into Great Britain; and for raising a certain Sum of Money, by Annuities and a Lottery, in Manner therein mentioned, to be charged on the said additional Duties. (Repealed by Statute Law Revision Act 1870 (33 & 34 Vict. c. 69))
Recruiting Act 1744 (repealed)	18 Geo. 2. c. 10	19 March 1745
An Act for the speedy and effectual recruiting of His Majesty's Regiments of Foot, serving in Flanders, Minorca, Gibraltar, and the Plantations, and the Regiments of Marines. (Repealed by Statute Law Revision Act 1867 (30 & 31 Vict. c. 59))
Indemnity Act 1744 (repealed)	18 Geo. 2. c. 11	19 March 1745
An Act to indemnify Persons who have omitted to qualify themselves for Offices and Employments within the Time limited by Law; and for allowing further Time for that Purpose. (Repealed by Statute Law Revision Act 1867 (30 & 31 Vict. c. 59))
Newbury and Marlborough Roads Act 1744 (repealed)	18 Geo. 2. c. 12	19 March 1745
An Act for continuing and enlarging the Term and Powers granted by an Act made in the Twelfth Year of the Reign of His late Majesty King George the First, (Note: Newbury to Marlborough Road Act 1725 (12 Geo. 1. c. 8)) for repairing the Highways from Speenham Land, adjoining to Newbury, in the County of Berks, to Marlborough, in the County of Wilts. (Repealed by Berks and Wilts Roads Act 1770 (10 Geo. 3. c. 100))
Beverly Improvement Act 1744 (repealed)	18 Geo. 2. c. 13	19 March 1745
An Act for more effectually cleansing, deepening, widening, and preserving, a Creek, called Beverley Beck, running into the River Hull; and for more effectually repairing the Staiths near the said Beck, and the Roads leading from the said River to the Town of Beverley; and for cleansing the Streets of the said Town; and for regulating the Carriages to and from the said Beck and the River Hull. (Repealed by Humberside Act 1982 (c. iii))
Wiltshire Road Act 1744 (repealed)	18 Geo. 2. c. 14	19 March 1745
An Act for enlarging the Term and Powers granted by several Acts of Parliament, for repairing the Highways between Shepherds Shord and The Devizes, and the Top of Ashlington Hill and RowdFord, in the County of Wilts. (Repealed by Devizes Roads Act 1797 (37 Geo. 3. c. 154))
London Barbers and Surgeons Act 1744	18 Geo. 2. c. 15	2 May 1745
An Act for making the Surgeons of London and the Barbers of London Two separate and distinct Corporations.
Tadcaster Bridge and Hob Moor Lane Road Act 1744 (repealed)	18 Geo. 2. c. 16	2 May 1745
An Act to repair the Road leading from Tadcaster Bridge, (Note: Tadcaster Bridge, Tadcaster, North Yorkshire. 53°53′06″N 1°15′36″W) within the County of the City of York, to a Place near the said City, called Hobmoor Lane End. (Note: The lane to Hob Moor from the A1063 Tadcaster Road, York, at the site of York Tyburn. 53°56′47″N 1°06′06″W) (Repealed by Tadcaster Bridge and Hob Moor Lane Road Act 1808 (48 Geo. 3. c. xxvi) and Tadcaster Bridge and Hob Moor Lane Road Act 1833 (3 & 4 Will. 4. c. lxxxiii))
Discovery of North-West Passage Act 1744 (repealed)	18 Geo. 2. c. 17	2 May 1745
An Act for giving a public Reward to such Person or Persons, His Majesty's Subject or Subjects, as shall discover a North-west Passage, through Hudson's Streights, to the Western and Southern Ocean of America. (Repealed by Discovery of Longitude at Sea, etc. Act 1818 (58 Geo. 3. c. 20))
Parliamentary Elections Act 1744 (repealed)	18 Geo. 2. c. 18	2 May 1745
An Act to explain and amend the Laws touching the Elections of Knights of the Shire, to serve in Parliament, for that Part of Great Britain called England. (Repealed by Statute Law Revision Act 1867 (30 & 31 Vict. c. 59), Ballot Act 1872 (35 & 36 Vict. c. 33) and Representation of the People Act 1918 (7 & 8 Geo. 5. c. 64))
Warwickshire Roads Act 1744 (repealed)	18 Geo. 2. c. 19	2 May 1745
An Act for repairing the Road from Birmingham, in the County of Warwick (through Elmdon), to a Lane leading by the End of Stone Bridge, in the said County. (Repealed by Birmingham and Stonebridge Road Act 1832 (2 & 3 Will. 4. c. xxxiii))
Justices Qualification Act 1744 (repealed)	18 Geo. 2. c. 20	2 May 1745
An Act to amend and render more effectual an Act passed in the Fifth Year of His present Majesty's Reign, intituled, "An Act for the further Qualification of Justices of the Peace." (Note: Justices Qualification Act 1731 (5 Geo. 2. c. 18)) (Repealed by Justices of the Peace Act 1906 (6 Edw. 7. c. 16))
Lastage and Ballastage, Thames Act 1744 (repealed)	18 Geo. 2. c. 21	2 May 1745
An Act to continue an Act made in the Sixth Year of the Reign of His present Majesty, (Note: River Thames (Lastage and Ballastage) Act 1732 (6 Geo. 2. c. 29)) for the better Regulation of Lastage and Ballastage in the River Thames. (Repealed by Statute Law Revision Act 1867 (30 & 31 Vict. c. 59))
Stamps Act 1744 (repealed)	18 Geo. 2. c. 22	2 May 1745
An Act for granting to His Majesty the Sum of Eight Hundred Thousand Pounds, out of the Sinking Fund; and for granting a Sum remaining in the Exchequer, arisen by the Surplus of the Duties upon Malt, Mum, Cyder, and Perry, for the Service of the Year One Thousand Seven Hundred and Forty-five; and for the further appropriating the Supplies granted in this Session of Parliament; and for giving further Time for the Payment of Duties omitted to be paid for the Indentures or Contracts of Clerks and Apprentices; and for the further enforcing the Payment of the said Duties. (Repealed by Inland Revenue Repeal Act 1870 (33 & 34 Vict. c. 99))
Huntingdonshire and Cambridgeshire Roads Act 1744 (repealed)	18 Geo. 2. c. 23	2 May 1745
An Act to repair and widen the Road leading from Godmanchester, in the County of Huntingdon, through Fen-Stanton and Cambridge, to the First Rubbing-House on Newmarket Heath, in the County of Cambridge. (Repealed by Godmanchester and Cambridge Road Act 1813 (53 Geo. 3. c. xli) and Cambridge to Newmarket Heath Road Act 1815 (55 Geo. 3. c. xlix))
Linen (Trade Marks) Act 1744 (repealed)	18 Geo. 2. c. 24	2 May 1745
An Act for effectually preventing the Exportation of Foreign Linens, under the Denomination of British or Irish Linens. (Repealed by Statute Law Revision Act 1959 (7 & 8 Eliz. 2. c. 68))
Bounties on Exportation Act 1744 (repealed)	18 Geo. 2. c. 25	2 May 1745
An Act for allowing certain additional Bounties on the Exportation of British and Irish Linens. (Repealed by Statute Law Revision Act 1867 (30 & 31 Vict. c. 59))
Inland Duties, etc. Act 1744 (repealed)	18 Geo. 2. c. 26	2 May 1745
An Act for repealing the present Inland Duty of Four Shillings per Pound Weight upon all Tea sold in Great Britain, and for granting to His Majesty certain other Inland Duties in Lieu thereof; and for better securing the Duty upon Tea, and other Duties of Excise; and for pursuing Offenders out of one County into another. (Repealed by Statute Law Revision Act 1867 (30 & 31 Vict. c. 59))
Stealing from Bleaching Grounds Act 1744 (repealed)	18 Geo. 2. c. 27	2 May 1745
An Act for more effectually preventing the stealing of Linen, Fustian, and Cotton Goods and Wares, in Buildings, Fields, Grounds, and other Places used for printing, whitening, bleaching, or drying the same. (Repealed by Statute Law Revision Act 1867 (30 & 31 Vict. c. 59))
Indemnity (No. 2) Act 1744 (repealed)	18 Geo. 2. c. 28	2 May 1745
An Act to indemnify Persons who have been guilty of the unlawful importing, landing, or running, of prohibited, uncustomed, or other Goods or Merchandize. (Repealed by Statute Law Revision Act 1867 (30 & 31 Vict. c. 59))
Westminster Bridge Act 1744 (repealed)	18 Geo. 2. c. 29	2 May 1745
An Act for granting further Powers to the Commissioners for building a Bridge cross the River Thames, from the City of Westminster, to the opposite Shore in the County of Surrey; and for the better enabling them to finish the said Bridge, and to perform the other Trusts reposed in them. (Repealed by Westminster Bridge Act 1853 (16 & 17 Vict. c. 46))
Piracy Act 1744 (repealed)	18 Geo. 2. c. 30	2 May 1745
An Act to amend an Act made in the Eleventh Year of the Reign of King William the Third, intituled, "An Act for the more effectual Suppression of Piracy." (Note: Piracy Act 1698 (11 Will. 3. c. 7)) (Repealed for England and Wales by Criminal Law Act 1967 (c. 58) and for Scotland by Statute Law (Repeals) Act 1993 (c. 50))
Greenwich Hospital Act 1744 (repealed)	18 Geo. 2. c. 31	2 May 1745
An Act for the more effectual recovering and collecting of certain Duties granted towards the Support of the Royal Hospital at Greenwich; and to oblige Agents for Prizes to register their Letters of Attorney. (Repealed by Greenwich Hospital Act 1834 (4 & 5 Will. 4. c. 34))
Birmingham to Edgehill Road Act 1744 (repealed)	18 Geo. 2. c. 32	2 May 1745
An Act for continuing, amending, and making more effectual, an Act made in the Twelfth Year of the Reign of King George the First, (Note: Birmingham to Edgehill Road Act 1725 (12 Geo. 1. c. 6)) for repairing the Roads leading from Birmingham to Edghill, in the County of Warwick. (Repealed by Birmingham and Stratford-upon-Avon Road Act 1821 (1 & 2 Geo. 4. c. lxxxi) and Birmingham and Edgehill Road Act 1830 (11 Geo. 4 & 1 Will. 4. c. xciv))
Carts on Highways Act 1744 (repealed)	18 Geo. 2. c. 33	2 May 1745
An Act to repeal a Clause in an Act made in the Third Year of the Reign of King William and Queen Mary, (Note: Highways, etc. Act 1691 (3 Will. & Mar. c. 12)) relating to Carts used by Persons inhabiting within the Limits of the Weekly Bills of Mortality; and to allow such Carts to be drawn with Three Horses; and to prevent the Misbehaviour of the Drivers of Carts, in Streets within the said Limits. (Repealed by Highway Act 1835 (5 & 6 Will. 4. c. 50) and Statute Law Revision Act 1948 (11 & 12 Geo. 6. c. 62))
Gaming Act 1744 (repealed)	18 Geo. 2. c. 34	2 May 1745
An Act to explain, amend, and make more effectual, the Laws in being, to prevent excessive and deceitful Gaming; and to restrain and prevent the excessive Increase of Horse Races. (Repealed for England and Wales and Scotland by Betting and Gaming Act 1960 (8 & 9 Eliz. 2. c. 60) and for Northern Ireland by Betting, Gaming, Lotteries and Amusements (Northern Ireland) Order 1985 (SI 1985/1204 (N.I. 11)))
Navy Act 1744 (repealed)	18 Geo. 2. c. 35	2 May 1745
An Act for the further Regulating and better Government of His Majesty's Navies, Ships of War, and Forces by Sea; and for regulating Proceedings upon Courts Martial in the Sea Service. (Repealed by Navy Act 1748 (22 Geo. 2. c. 33))
Cambrics Act 1744 (repealed)	18 Geo. 2. c. 36	2 May 1745
An Act for prohibiting the Wearing and Importation of Cambricks and French Lawns. (Repealed by Statute Law Revision Act 1867 (30 & 31 Vict. c. 59))
Crown Lands (Forfeited Estates) Act 1744 (repealed)	18 Geo. 2. c. 37	2 May 1745
An Act for empowering the surviving Commissioners and Trustees for forfeited Estates to execute proper Conveyances of the late Lord Widdrington's Estate, in the County of Northumberland (contracted for by the York Buildings Company), to Trustees, for the Creditors of the said Company, upon Payment of a Sum of Money therein mentioned into His Majesty's Exchequer. (Repealed by Statute Law Revision Act 1948 (11 & 12 Geo. 6. c. 62))
Bristol Hospitals Act 1744 (repealed)	18 Geo. 2. c. 38	2 May 1745
An Act for rendering more effectual the several Acts passed for the erecting of Hospitals and Workhouses within the City of Bristol, for the better employing and maintaining of the Poor thereof. (Repealed by Bristol Improvement Act 1822 (3 Geo. 4. c. xxiv))

=== Private acts ===
Short title	Citation	Royal assent
Long title
Le Blon's Naturalization Act 1744	18 Geo. 2. c. 1 Pr.	20 December 1744
An Act for naturalizing Sir John Charles Le Blon.
Naturalization of Christian Heineken, Dominick Lieutaud, Henry Geutjes and Others Act 1744	18 Geo. 2. c. 2 Pr.	20 December 1744
An Act for naturalizing Christian Heineken, Dominick Joseph Lieutaud, Henry Geutjes, and others.
Rose's Name Act 1744	18 Geo. 2. c. 3 Pr.	14 February 1745
An Act for confirming and establishing on John Pate Esquire and his Issue Male the Surname of Rose.
Marquis of Annandale's Name Act 1744	18 Geo. 2. c. 4 Pr.	19 March 1745
An Act to enable George Vanden Bempde Marquis of Annandale to use the Surname and Arms of Vanden Bempde, pursuant to the Will of John Vanden Bempde Esquire, deceased.
Enabling George Earl Cholmondeley and Pattee Viscount Torrington to take in Great Britain the oath of office as Vice Treasurer and Receiver General, and Paymaster General of His Majesty's revenues in Ireland and to qualify themselves for the enjoyment of the said offices.	18 Geo. 2. c. 5 Pr.	19 March 1745
An Act to enable George Earl Cholmondeley and Pattee Viscount Torrington to take, in Great Britain, the Oath of Office, as Vice Treasurer and Receiver General and Paymaster General of all His Majesty's Revenues in the Kingdom of Ireland; and to qualify themselves for the Enjoyment of the said Offices.
Exchange of Sir John Peachey's lands in Hampshire for Sir Thomas Knight's lands in Sussex.	18 Geo. 2. c. 6 Pr.	19 March 1745
An Act for exchanging divers Lands and Hereditaments in Hantshire, belonging to Sir John Peachy Baronet, for other Lands and Hereditaments in Sussex, belonging to Thomas Knight Esquire; and for settling the several Estates so taken in Exchange, to the Uses limited of the Estates given in Exchange for the same respectively.
Naturalizing of Dorothy Penton and qualifying and enabling her to enjoy a rent-charge limited to her upon her marriage in the name of her jointure.	18 Geo. 2. c. 7 Pr.	19 March 1745
An Act for naturalizing Dorothy Penton, Wise of Henry Penton Esquire; and for qualifying and enabling her to hold and enjoy a Rent-charge, limited to her upon her Marriage, in the Name of her Jointure.
Confirming to William Beauchamp and his heirs the surname Proctor, according to the will of George Proctor.	18 Geo. 2. c. 8 Pr.	19 March 1745
An Act for confirming to William Beauchamp Esquire and his Heirs the Surname of Proctor, according to the Direction of the last Will and Testament of George Proctor Esquire, deceased.
Uniting the vicarage of Fincham St. Martins to the rectory of Fincham St. Michaels (Norfolk) and settling the right of presentation to the same.	18 Geo. 2. c. 9 Pr.	19 March 1745
An Act for uniting the Vicarage of Fincham Saint Martin's, to the Rectory of Fincham Saint Michael's, in the County of Norfolk; and for settling the Right of Presentation to the same.
Regulating and making more effectual Richard Churchaer's Charity for benefit of Petersfield (Hampshire).	18 Geo. 2. c. 10 Pr.	19 March 1745
An Act for regulating and making more effectual a certain Charity, given by the Will of Richard Churcher Merchant, deceased, for the Benefit of the Town and Borough of Petersfield, in the County of Southampton.
Naturalizing Mark Cramer, Samuel Mestrezat and others.	18 Geo. 2. c. 11 Pr.	19 March 1745
An Act for naturalizing Mark Cramer, Samuel Mestrezat, and others.
Morin's Naturalization Act 1744	18 Geo. 2. c. 12 Pr.	19 March 1745
An Act for naturalizing Anthony Benjamin Morin.
Boteler's Estate Act 1744	18 Geo. 2. c. 13 Pr.	2 May 1745
An Act for vesting certain Lands and Hereditaments, Part of the settled Estate of Sir Philip Boteler Baronet, in the several Counties of Bedford and Kent, in the said Sir Philip Boteler and his Heirs; and for settling other Estates, in the several Counties of Kent and Hereford, of greater Value, to the like Uses, in Lieu thereof.
Sir Francis and Dame Ursula Skipwith: appropriation of £6,000, part of the portion agreed to be paid on their marriage, sale of part of his settled estate for discharge of debts and provision for his issue male.	18 Geo. 2. c. 14 Pr.	2 May 1745
An Act for appropriating the Sum of Six Thousand Pounds, Part of the Portion agreed on to be paid on the Marriage of Sir Francis Skipwith Baronet with Dame Ursula his Wife; and for Sale of Part of his settled Estate, for discharging his Debts; and securing an Equivalent to his Issue Male, in respect thereof.
Raising money from an estate entailed by the will of Sir William Myddelton for the purchasing of an estate near Chirk Castle (Denbighshire) to be settled to the uses of the will.	18 Geo. 2. c. 15 Pr.	2 May 1745
An Act for raising Money out of the Estate entailed by the Will of Sir William Myddleton Baronet, for purchasing an Estate lying near Chirk Castle, in the County of Denbigh, to be settled to the Uses of the same Will.
Gresham's Estate Act 1744	18 Geo. 2. c. 16 Pr.	2 May 1745
An Act for vesting Part of the Estate of Sir Marmaduke Gresham Baronet, deceased, in Trustees, to be sold, for Payment of his Debts, and a Legacy of Three Thousand Pounds affecting the same.
Sutton's Estate Act 1744	18 Geo. 2. c. 17 Pr.	2 May 1745
An Act for rectifying a Mistake in a Settlement made by Sir Robert Sutton Knight of the Bath, and also in an Act (Note: Sutton's Estate Act 1743 (17 Geo. 2. c. 26 Pr.)) passed the last Session of Parliament for Sale of the settled Estate of the said Sir Robert Sutton, in the County of Nottingham, for discharging Encumbrances.
Estates of William Robinson and Dame Dorothy Jeffreys: sale of lands in Denbighshire, Flintshire, Cheshire, Salop. and Anglesey for payment of debts and incumbrances.	18 Geo. 2. c. 18 Pr.	2 May 1745
An Act for Sale of the Estates late of William Robinson Esquire and Dame Dorothy Jeffreys, in the several Counties of Denbigh, Flint, Chester, Salop, and Anglesea, for Payment of their respective Debts and Encumbrances.
Worcester College Estate Act 1744	18 Geo. 2. c. 19 Pr.	2 May 1745
An Act for Sale of certain Leasehold Estates, late of Sarah Eaton, deceased, and by her devised to the Provost, Fellows, and Scholars, of Worcester College, in the University of Oxford; and for laying out the Money arising thereby in the Purchase of Fee Simple Estates; and for other Purposes therein mentioned.
Keck's Estate Act 1744	18 Geo. 2. c. 20 Pr.	2 May 1745
An Act for charging, selling, and applying, Part of the settled Estate of Anthony Keck Esquire, for raising Money, towards the Purchase of the Manors of Dalby and Broughton, in the County of Leicester, contracted for, pursuant to the Will of Anthony Keck his Grandfather; and for other Purposes therein mentioned.
Hooper's Estate Act 1744	18 Geo. 2. c. 21 Pr.	2 May 1745
An Act for empowering Trustees to secure and dispose of certain Effects, mentioned in the Will of Nicholas Hooper Esquire, deceased, for the Benefit of the Children of John Basset Esquire, to whom they are bequeathed.
Parry's Estate Act 1744	18 Geo. 2. c. 22 Pr.	2 May 1745
An Act for Sale of the settled and unsettled Estates of William Parry Esquire; and for purchasing another Estate, of equal Value with the settled Estate, to be settled to the same Uses; and for other Purposes therein mentioned.
Gould's Estate Act 1744	18 Geo. 2. c. 23 Pr.	2 May 1745
An Act for empowering Edward Gould Esquire and William Gould Clerk to make Jointures, upon their respective Marriages, out of the Estate devised to them by the Will of Sir Edward Gould Knight, deceased.
Wright's Estate Act 1744	18 Geo. 2. c. 24 Pr.	2 May 1745
An Act for vesting an undivided Moiety of certain Lands, in the County of Wilts, comprized in the Marriage Settlement of Robert Wright Clerk, in Trustees, to sell the same, for raising Money, to purchase an entire Farm, in the County of Suffolk, to be settled to the Uses of the same Settlement.
Hobbes' Estate Act 1744	18 Geo. 2. c. 25 Pr.	2 May 1745
An Act for Sale of the Freehold and Copyhold Estates of Rodolph Hobbes Gentleman, deceased, in the County of Bucks, for discharging Encumbrances affecting the same; and for making Provision for his Widow and Infant Children.
Luscombe's Estate Act 1744	18 Geo. 2. c. 26 Pr.	2 May 1745
An Act for vesting Part of the Estate late of Richard Luscombe Esquire, deceased, in the County of Devon, in Trustees, to be sold, for Payment of his Debts and Legacies.
Faxton in Lamport Inclosure Act 1744	18 Geo. 2. c. 27 Pr.	2 May 1745
An Act for enclosing and dividing the Common Fields in Faxton, within the Parish of Lamport, in the County of Northampton; and for giving a Recompense to the Rector of the said Parish, in Lieu of his Tithes of the said Common Fields.
Mathew's Divorce Act 1744	18 Geo. 2. c. 28 Pr.	2 May 1745
An Act to dissolve the Marriage of Daniel Mathew Esquire with Penelope Smith his now Wife; and to enable him to marry again; and for other Purposes therein mentioned.
Naturalizing Peter Julian, Thomas Sapte and Peter Sapte.	18 Geo. 2. c. 29 Pr.	2 May 1745
An Act for naturalizing Peter Bartholomew Julian, Peter Sapte, and Thomas Sapte.

=== Sources ===
- Pickering, Danby, ed. (1765). The Statutes at Large. Vol. 18: From the 15th to the 20th Year of King George II. Cambridge: Joseph Bentham – via Internet Archive.
- Pickering, Danby, ed. (1765). The Statutes at Large. Vol. 18: From the 15th to the 20th Year of King George II. Cambridge: Joseph Bentham – via Google Books.
- Journals of the House of Commons. Vol. 24. London: His Majesty's Stationery Office. 1803. pp. 689–892 – via Google Books.
- Chronological Table of and Index to the Statutes. Vol. 1: To the End of the Session 59 Vict. Sess. 2 (1895) (13th ed.). London: Her Majesty's Stationery Office. 1896. pp. 108–109 – via Google Books.
- "Acts of the Parliament of Great Britain from 1744". legislation.gov.uk. The National Archives.

== See also ==
- List of acts of the Parliament of Great Britain
