= Law Reform (Miscellaneous Provisions) (Scotland) Act 1980 =

Act of the Parliament of the United Kingdom

Law Reform (Miscellaneous Provisions) (Scotland) Act 1980 (Note: Section 29(1).)
- Act of Parliament
- Parliament of the United Kingdom
- Long title: An Act to make new provision for Scotland as respects the law relating to the qualification of jurors; to amend the law relating to jury service in Scotland; to make further provision for Scotland in respect of prior rights in the estates of deceased persons; to dispense with caution as regards certain executors-dative; to provide a procedure whereby an heir of provision may establish entitlement to act as trustee; to amend provisions of the Judicial Factors Act 1849 and the Trusts (Scotland) Act 1961 relating to the actings of judicial factors; to remove an obligation to preserve inventories of the estates of deceased persons in Scotland; to make further provision in respect of performance of the duties of sheriff principal; to amend the law relating to the jurisdiction and powers of the sheriff court; to empower Senators of the College of Justice to act as arbiters and oversmen in commercial disputes; to make further provision in respect of awards of compensation by the Lands Tribunal for Scotland; to remove the right of a vexatious litigant to appeal against a Lord Ordinary's refusal to allow the institution of legal proceedings; to amend the law relating to the jurisdiction of the Court of Session in actions for reduction; to amend the provisions of the Licensing (Scotland) Act 1976 relating to liability for offences committed by clubs; to amend provisions of the Marriage (Scotland) Act 1977 relating to the validity of marriages; to amend the provisions of the Prescription and Limitation (Scotland) Act 1973 relating to limitation of actions; to amend the law relating to the constitution and powers of the Scottish Solicitors' Discipline Tribunal; to make further provision as regards Scottish solicitors' clients' accounts; to enable amendments to be made to provisions of the Legal Aid (Scotland) Act 1967 relating to contributions from assisted persons; to make minor amendments to the Betting, Gaming and Lotteries Act 1963, the Lotteries and Amusements Act 1976 and the Licensing (Scotland) Act 1976; and for connected purposes.
- Citation: 1980 c. 55
- Territorial extent: Scotland

Dates
- Royal assent: 29 October 1980
- Commencement: 22 December 1980 (Note: Section 29(2). The Law Reform (Miscellaneous Provisions) (Scotland) Act 1980 (Commencement) Order 1980 (SI 1980/1726).)

Other legislation
- Amends: Confirmation of Executors (Scotland) Act 1823; Juries (Scotland) Act 1826; Judicial Factors Act 1849; Titles to Land Consolidation (Scotland) Act 1868; Customs, Inland Revenue, and Savings Banks Act 1877; Judicial Factors (Scotland) Act 1880; Vexatious Actions (Scotland) Act 1898; Executors (Scotland) Act 1900; Sheriff Courts (Scotland) Act 1907; Bankruptcy (Scotland) Act 1913; Sheriff Courts (Scotland) Act 1913; Trusts (Scotland) Act 1921; Juries Act 1949; Trusts (Scotland) Act 1961; Betting, Gaming and Lotteries Act 1963; Succession (Scotland) Act 1964; Legal Aid (Scotland) Act 1967; Sheriff Courts (Scotland) Act 1971; Prescription and Limitation (Scotland) Act 1973; Criminal Procedure (Scotland) Act 1975; Lotteries and Amusements Act 1976; Licensing (Scotland) Act 1976; Marriage (Scotland) Act 1977; Solicitors (Scotland) Act 1980; See § Repealed enactments
- Repeals/revokes: See § Repealed enactments
- Amended by: Prescription and Limitation (Scotland) Act 1984; Bankruptcy (Scotland) Act 1985; Statute Law (Repeals) Act 1986; Legal Aid (Scotland) Act 1986; European Communities (Amendment) Act 1986; Criminal Justice Act 1988; Solicitors (Scotland) Act 1988; Statute Law (Repeals) Act 1989; Statute Law (Repeals) Act 1993; Criminal Justice and Public Order Act 1994; Criminal Justice (Scotland) Act 1995; Criminal Procedure (Consequential Provisions) (Scotland) Act 1995; Party Wall etc. Act 1996; Crime and Punishment (Scotland) Act 1997; Police Act 1997; Government of Wales Act 1998; Scotland Act 1998; Scotland Act 1998 (Consequential Modifications) (No. 1) Order 1999; Scotland Act 1998 (Consequential Modifications) (No. 2) Order 1999; Adults with Incapacity (Scotland) Act 2000; Criminal Justice (Scotland) Act 2003; Criminal Justice Act 2003; Abolition of Feudal Tenure etc. (Scotland) Act 2000 (Consequential Provisions) Order 2004; Constitutional Reform Act 2005; Serious Organised Crime and Police Act 2005; Licensing (Scotland) Act 2005; Mental Health (Care and Treatment) (Scotland) Act 2003 (Modification of Enactments) Order 2005; Management of Offenders etc. (Scotland) Act 2005 (Supplementary Provisions) Order 2006; Arbitration (Scotland) Act 2010; Criminal Justice and Licensing (Scotland) Act 2010; Police and Fire Reform (Scotland) Act 2012; Crime and Courts Act 2013; Courts Reform (Scotland) Act 2014; Public Services Reform (Inspection and Monitoring of Prisons) (Scotland) Order 2015; Courts Reform (Scotland) Act 2014 (Consequential Provisions) Order 2016; Courts Reform (Scotland) Act 2014 (Relevant Officer and Consequential Provisions) Order 2016; Armed Forces (Flexible Working) Act 2018; Sentencing Act 2020; Management of Offenders (Scotland) Act 2019 (Consequential Amendments) Regulations 2020; Trusts and Succession (Scotland) Act 2024; Children (Care and Justice) (Scotland) Act 2024

Status: Amended

Text of statute as originally enacted

Revised text of statute as amended

Text of the Law Reform (Miscellaneous Provisions) (Scotland) Act 1980 as in force today (including any amendments) within the United Kingdom, from legislation.gov.uk.

The Law Reform (Miscellaneous Provisions) (Scotland) Act 1980 (c. 55) is an act of the Parliament of the United Kingdom that made various reforms to the law of Scotland.

== Provisions ==
=== Repealed enactments ===
Section 28(2) of the act repealed 38 enactments, listed in the third schedule to the act.

Citation	Short title	Extent of repeal
55 Geo. 3. c. 42	Jury Trials (Scotland) Act 1815	Section 22.
6 Geo. 4. c. 22	Jurors (Scotland) Act 1825	Sections 1 and 2.
31 & 32 Vict. c. 100	Court of Session Act 1868	Section 43.
32 & 33 Vict. c. 36	Juries (Lighthouse Keepers Exemption) Act 1869	The whole act.
40 & 41 Vict. c. 13	Customs, Inland Revenue and Savings Banks Act 1877	In section 12, the words from ", instead " to " same at his office in Edinburgh ".
43 & 44 Vict. c. 4	Judicial Factors (Scotland) Act 1880	In section 4, paragraphs 2 and 3.
53 & 54 Vict. c. 21	Inland Revenue Regulation Act 1890	In section 8, the words " or on any jury or inquest whatsoever ".
7 Edw. 7. c. 51	Sheriff Courts (Scotland) Act 1907	In section 3, paragraph (q).
7 Edw. 7. c. 51	Sheriff Courts (Scotland) Act 1907	In section 5, in subsection (5) the words " where the debt exclusive of interest and expenses does not exceed fifty pounds "; and the words from " Provided also that it" to the end.
7 Edw. 7. c. 51	Sheriff Courts (Scotland) Act 1907	In section 7, the words " Subject to the provisions of this Act".
7 Edw. 7. c. 51	Sheriff Courts (Scotland) Act 1907	In section 27(D) the words " not being an interlocutor fixing a diet for jury trial ".
7 Edw. 7. c. 51	Sheriff Courts (Scotland) Act 1907	Sections 30 and 31.
7 Edw. 7. c. 51	Sheriff Courts (Scotland) Act 1907	In Schedule 1, in rule 123, the words " not exceeding fifty pounds, exclusive of interest and expenses "; and rules 133 to 150.
10 Edw. 7 & 1 Geo. 5. c. 31	Jury Trials Amendment (Scotland) Act 1910	In section 2, the words from " or (b) " to " 1907 ".
2 & 3 Geo. 5. c. 28	Sheriff Courts (Scotland) Act 1913	Section 6.
3 & 4 Geo. 5. c. 20	Bankruptcy (Scotland) Act 1913	In section 163, the words " where the assets of the deceased are estimated not to exceed five hundred pounds ".
9 & 10 Geo. 5. c. 71	Sex Disqualification (Removal) Act 1919	In section 1, the words " and a person shall not be exempted by sex or marriage from the liability to serve as a juror ".
9 & 10 Geo. 5. c. 71	Sex Disqualification (Removal) Act 1919	In section 4(2), the words " and any enactment relating to juries shall have effect so as to accord with the provisions of this Act".
9 & 10 Geo. 5. c. 92	Aliens Restriction (Amendment) Act 1919	Section 8.
10 & 11 Geo. 5. c. 53	Jurors (Enrolment of Women) (Scotland) Act 1920	In section 1(1), the words from "The enactments" to "always that"; and the word " that" where it occurs for the second time.
10 & 11 Geo. 5. c. 53	Jurors (Enrolment of Women) (Scotland) Act 1920	In section 2, the words from " Without prejudice" to " 1919 ".
23 & 24 Geo. 5. c. 41	Administration of Justice (Scotland) Act 1933	Section 22.
12 & 13 Geo. 6. c. 27	Juries Act 1949	Section 25(1)(c).
14 & 15 Geo. 6. c. 54	Midwives (Scotland) Act 1951	Section 27.
1 & 2 Eliz. 2. c. 50	Auxiliary Forces Act 1953	In section 39(3), the words " and shall be exempt from serving on any jury ".
3 & 4 Eliz. 2. c. 18	Army Act 1955	Section 183.
3 & 4 Eliz. 2. c. 19	Air Force Act 1955	Section 183.
5 & 6 Eliz. 2. c. 28	Dentists Act 1957	In section 32, in subsection (1) the words " serving on all juries and inquests whatsoever and from "; and subsection (2).
6 & 7 Eliz. 2. c. 61	Interest on Damages (Scotland) Act 1958	Section 2.
1966 c. 36	Veterinary Surgeons Act 1966	Section 24(1).
1970 c. 9	Taxes Management Act 1970	Section 5(2).
1971 c. 31	Interest on Damages (Scotland) Act 1971	Section 1(2).
1971 c. 58	Sheriff Courts (Scotland) Act 1971	Sections 39 and 40.
1971 c. 58	Sheriff Courts (Scotland) Act 1971	In section 41(2), the words " section 39, section 40 ".
1972 c. 41	Finance Act 1972	In Schedule 6, paragraph 9 in so far as relating to juries in Scotland.
1973 c. 25	Succession (Scotland) Act 1973	Section 1(2) and (3).
1973 c. 45	Domicile and Matrimonial Proceedings Act 1973	Section 9.
1973 c. 52	Prescription and Limitation (Scotland) Act 1973	In section 22(6), the words ", whether in the Court of Session or the sheriff court,".
1975 c. 21	Criminal Procedure (Scotland) Act 1975	Schedule 2.
1975 c. 78	Airports Authority Act 1975	Section 10(7).
1976 c. 36	Lotteries and Amusements Act 1976	In Schedule 3, in paragraphs 4(1)(a) and 17(1)(a), the words " or certificate ".
1976 c. 66	Licensing (Scotland) Act 1976	Section 140(1).
1977 c. 15	Marriage (Scotland) Act 1977	Section 13(2) and (3).
1978 c. 10	European Assembly Elections Act 1978	Section 5(2).
1979 c. 2	Customs and Excise Management Act 1979	Section 175(2).
1979 c. 36	Nurses, Midwives and Health Visitors Act 1979	Section 18.
