= Lotteries and Amusements Act 1976 =

Act of the Parliament of the United Kingdom

Lotteries and Amusements Act 1976 (Note: Section 25(1).)
- Act of Parliament
- Parliament of the United Kingdom
- Long title: An Act to consolidate certain enactments relating to lotteries, prize competitions and amusements with prizes.
- Citation: 1976 c. 32
- Territorial extent: England and Wales; Scotland; (Note: Section 25(10).)

Dates
- Royal assent: 22 July 1976
- Commencement: 1 May 1977 (rest of act) (Note: Section 25(9). The Lotteries Act 1975 (Commencement No. 2) Order 1977 (SI 1977/409).)
- Repealed: 1 September 2007 (Note: The Gambling Act 2005 (Commencement No. 6 and Transitional Provisions) Order 2006 (SI 2006/3272).)

Other legislation
- Amends: See § Repealed enactments
- Repeals/revokes: See § Repealed enactments
- Amended by: Law Reform (Miscellaneous Provisions) (Scotland) Act 1980; Betting and Gaming Duties Act 1981; Law Reform (Miscellaneous Provisions) (Scotland) Act 1985; Local Government (Wales) Act 1994; Local Government etc. (Scotland) Act 1994; Amusements with Prizes (Variation of Monetary Limits) (Scotland) Order 1995; Employment Rights Act 1996; Lotteries (Gaming Board Fees) Order 1996; Amusements with Prizes (Variation of Monetary Limits) Order 1996; Amusements with Prizes (Variation of Monetary Limits) (Scotland) Order 1996; Lotteries (Prizes and Expenses: Variation and Prescription of Percentage Limits) Order 1997; Lotteries (Gaming Board Fees) Order 1997; Amusements with Prizes (Variation of Monetary Limits) Order 1997; Access to Justice Act 1999; Licensing Act 2003; Statute Law (Repeals) Act 2004; Lotteries (Gaming Board Fees) Order 2004; Gambling Act 2005; Lotteries (Gaming Board Fees) Order 2005; Courts Act 2003 (Consequential Provisions) Order 2005; Licensing Act 2003 (Amendment of the Lotteries and Amusements Act 1976) (Transfer of Amusements With Prizes Permits) Order 2005; Lotteries (Gambling Commission Fees) Order 2006
- Repealed by: Gambling Act 2005

Status: Repealed

Text of statute as originally enacted

Revised text of statute as amended

The Lotteries and Amusements Act 1976 (c. 32) was an act of the Parliament of the United Kingdom that consolidated enactments relating to lotteries, prize competitions and amusements with prizes in Great Britain.

== Provisions ==
=== Repealed enactments ===
Section 25(3) of the act repealed 8 enactments, listed in schedule 5 to the act.

Enactments repealed by section 25(3)
Citation	Short title	Extent of repeal
1963 c. 2	Betting, Gaming and Lotteries Act 1963	Parts III and IV. Section 52(1A). Section 54. In section 55, the definition of "newspaper" in subsection (1), and subsection (2). Schedule 6.
1966 c. 42	Local Government Act 1966	In Part II of Schedule 3, in paragraph 23 the words "paragraph 16 of Schedule 6".
1966 c. 51	Local Government (Scotland) Act 1966	In Part II of Schedule 4, in paragraph 26 the words "paragraph 16 of Schedule 6".
1968 c. 65	Gaming Act 1968	Section 33(6). Section 41(11). In section 53, in subsection (1) the words in paragraph (a) from "and the Schedule" onwards. In Schedule 11, in Part I the entries relating to sections 41, 42, 48, 49 and 54 of the Betting, Gaming and Lotteries Act 1963, and Part II.
1971 c. 23	Courts Act 1971	In Schedule 9, in the entry relating to the Betting, Gaming and Lotteries Act 1963, the words "Schedule VI, 8 to 11" and the words "Schedule VII, 5".
1971 c. 57	Pool Competitions Act 1971	Section 2(5)(b).
1973 c. 65	Local Government (Scotland) Act 1973	In Schedule 24, paragraphs 28 and 29.
1975 c. 58	Lotteries Act 1975	The whole act, except section 20(1) and (3) and paragraph 6 of Schedule 4.

== Subsequent developments ==
The whole act was repealed by section 356(3)(i) of the Gambling Act 2005, which came into force on 1 September 2007.
