= Veterinary Surgeons Act 1966 =

Act of the Parliament of the United Kingdom

Veterinary Surgeons Act 1966 (Note: Section 29(1).)
- Act of Parliament
- Parliament of the United Kingdom
- Long title: An Act to make fresh provision for the management of the veterinary profession, for the registration of veterinary surgeons and veterinary practitioners, for regulating their professional education and professional conduct and for cancelling or suspending registration in cases of misconduct; and for connected purposes.
- Citation: 1966 c. 36
- Territorial extent: United Kingdom (Note: Section 29(2).)

Dates
- Royal assent: 17 November 1966
- Commencement: various (Note: Section 29(3)–(4).)

Other legislation
- Amends: See § Repealed enactments
- Repeals/revokes: See § Repealed enactments
- Amended by: Criminal Justice Act 1972; Northern Ireland Constitution Act 1973; Law Reform (Miscellaneous Provisions) (Scotland) Act 1980; Education Act 1996; Veterinary Surgeons' Qualifications (European Recognition) Order 2003; Statute Law (Repeals) Act 2004; Constitutional Reform Act 2005; Veterinary Surgeons' Qualifications (European Recognition) Order 2007; Veterinary Surgeons' Qualifications (European Recognition) Regulations 2008; Local Education Authorities and Children's Services Authorities (Integration of Functions) Order 2010; Treaty of Lisbon (Changes in Terminology) Order 2011; Crime and Courts Act 2013; Legislative Reform (Constitution of Veterinary Surgeons Preliminary Investigation and Disciplinary Committees) Order 2013; Veterinary Surgeons' Qualifications (Recognition) (Switzerland and Croatia) Regulations 2013; Veterinary Surgeons' Qualifications (European Recognition and Knowledge of Language) Regulations 2015; Data Protection Act 2018; Legislative Reform (Constitution of the Council of the Royal College of Veterinary Surgeons) Order 2018; Veterinary Surgeons and Animal Welfare (Amendment) (EU Exit) Regulations 2019; Professional Qualifications and Services (Amendments and Miscellaneous Provisions) (EU Exit) Regulations 2020

Status: Amended

Text of statute as originally enacted

Revised text of statute as amended

Text of the Veterinary Surgeons Act 1966 as in force today (including any amendments) within the United Kingdom, from legislation.gov.uk.

The Veterinary Surgeons Act 1966 (c. 36) is an act of the Parliament of the United Kingdom that makes legal provision for the definition of the qualifications to practise veterinary surgery in the realm.

== Provisions ==
=== Repealed enactments ===
Section 28(1) of the act repealed 4 enactments, listed in schedule 4 to the act.

Citation	Short title	Extent of repeal
44 & 45 Vict. c. 62	Veterinary Surgeons Act 1881	The whole act.
22 & 23 Geo. 5. c. 10	Veterinary Surgeons (Irish Free State Agreement) Act 1932	The whole act.
11 & 12 Geo. 6. c. 52	Veterinary Surgeons Act 1948	The whole act, except sections 23, 30 and 31(1) and Schedule 2.
10 & 11 Eliz. 2. c. 23	South Africa Act 1962	In Schedule 3, paragraph 2.
