= Lotteries Act 1710 =

Act of the Parliament of Great Britain

Lotteries Act 1710 (Note: The citation of this act by this short title was authorised by section 1 of, and the first schedule to, the Short Titles Act 1896. Due to the repeal of those provisions it is now authorised by section 19(2) of the Interpretation Act 1978.)
- Act of Parliament
- Parliament of Great Britain
- Long title: An Act for reviving continuing and appropriating certain Duties upon several Commodities to be exported and certain Duties upon Coals to be waterborn and carried Coastwise and for granting further Duties upon Candles for Thirty two Years to raise Fifteen hundred thousand Pounds by way of a Lottery for the Service of the Year One thousand seven hundred and eleven and for suppressing such unlawful Lotteries and such Insurance Offices as are therein mentioned. (Note: The long title as amended in 1887 was "An Act ... for suppressing such unlawful Lotteries ... as are therein mentioned.")
- Citation: 9 Ann. c. 6
- Territorial extent: Great Britain

Dates
- Royal assent: 6 March 1711
- Commencement: 25 November 1710 (Note: Start of session.)
- Repealed: England and Wales and Scotland: 1 January 1935; Republic of Ireland: 1 March 1956; Northern Ireland: 1 August 1957 (Note: The Betting and Lotteries Act (Northern Ireland) 1957 (Date of Commencement) Order (Northern Ireland) 1957 (SI 1963/60))

Other legislation
- Amended by: Lotteries Act 1823; Customs Law Repeal Act 1825; Statute Law Revision Act 1867; Statute Law Revision Act 1887; Statute Law Revision Act 1953
- Repealed by: England and Wales and Scotland: Betting and Lotteries Act 1934; Republic of Ireland:Gaming and Lotteries Act 1956; Northern Ireland: Betting and Lotteries Act (Northern Ireland) 1957
- Relates to: Unlawful Games Act 1541; Unlawful Games Act 1728; Gaming Act 1738; Gaming Act 1739; Gaming Act 1744

Status: Repealed

Text of statute as originally enacted

The Lotteries Act 1710 (9 Ann. c. 6) was an act of the Parliament of Great Britain. As enacted, it specified duties on exports of certain commodities, coal, and candles and regulated the state lottery. Section 57, the last to be repealed, reinforced the Suppression of Lotteries Act 1698 (10 Will. 3. c. 23) (Note: This is the citation in The Statutes of the Realm) and specified a £100 fine for offenders, to be distributed one third each to the Crown, the parish poor, and the informant.

Section 14 in Ruffhead's Edition corresponds to sections 14 and 15 in The Statutes of the Realm, and later section numbers are consequently one less in Ruffhead.

The penalties specified in the act for unauthorised lotteries were extended to the Kingdom of Ireland in 1756.

Some of the duties ceased automatically after 32 years; others were ceased by various acts from 1784 onwards. (Note: The 1867 Statute Law Revision Bill lists: 24 Geo. 3. Sess. 2. c. 11 s 10; 24 Geo. 3. Sess. 2. c. 36 s 1; 27 Geo. 3. c. 13 ss 1, 35; 1 & 2 Geo. 4. c. 67 s 1; 5 Geo. 4. c. 74 s 23; 6 Geo. 4. c. 105; 7 Geo. 4. c. 48 s 52.) The 1710 act's provisions regulating the state lottery were amended by later acts until it was finally abolished under the Lotteries Act 1823 (4 Geo. 4. c. 60).

== Subsequent developments ==
The whole act, except section 57, was repealed by section 1 of, and the schedule to, the Statute Law Revision Act 1867 (30 & 31 Vict. c. 59), which came into force on 15 July 1867.

The portions of the long title describing the provisions repealed in 1867 were deleted by the Statute Law Revision Act 1887 (50 & 51 Vict. c. 59) .

In section 57, the words from " to be recovered by information " to the end of the section were repealed for Northern Ireland by section 1 of, and the first schedule to, the Statute Law Revision Act 1953 (2 & 3 Eliz. 2. c. 5), which came into force on 18 December 1953.

The whole act was repealed for Great Britain by section 32 of, and the second schedule to, the Betting and Lotteries Act 1934 (24 & 25 Geo. 5. c. 58, which came into force on 1 January 1935),, for Northern Ireland by section 35 of, and part II of the schedule to, the Betting and Lotteries Act (Northern Ireland) 1957 (1957 c. 19 (N.I.)), which came into force on 1 August 1957, and for the Republic of Ireland by section 3 of, and part I of the schedule to, the Gaming and Lotteries Act 1956, which came into force on 1 March 1956.
