= Unlawful Games Act 1541 =

Act of the Parliament of England

Unlawful Games Act 1541 (Note: The citation of this act by this short title was authorised by section 5 of, and the second schedule to, the Statute Law Revision Act 1948. Due to the repeal of those provisions, it is now authorised by section 19(2) of the Interpretation Act 1978.)
- Act of Parliament
- Parliament of England
- Long title: An Acte for Mayntenance of Artyllarie and debarringe of unlawful Games. (Note: These words are printed against this act in the second column of the second schedule to the Statute Law Revision Act 1948, which is headed "Title".)
- Citation: 33 Hen. 8. c. 9
- Territorial extent: England and Wales

Dates
- Royal assent: 1 April 1542
- Commencement: 28 May 1542 (Note: Section 1. The Feast of Pentecost.)
- Repealed: 1 May 1961 (Note: The Betting and Gaming Act, 1960 (Commencement No. 1) Order 1960.)
Other legislation
Amends	Archery Act 1511
Amended by	Unlawful Games Act 1728; Repeal of Acts Concerning Importation Act 1822; Gaming Act 1845; Statute Law Revision Act 1863; Statute Law Revision Act 1888; Statute Law Revision Act 1948
Repealed by	Betting and Gaming Act 1960
Relates to	11 Hen. 4. c. 4; Lotteries Act 1710; Gaming Act 1738; Gaming Act 1739; Gaming Act 1744

Status: Repealed

Text of statute as originally enacted

The Unlawful Games Act 1541 (33 Hen. 8. c. 9), sometimes referred to as the Suppression of Unlawful Games Act 1541, was an act of the Parliament of England, designed to prohibit "Several new devised Games" that caused "the Decay of Archery". All Men under the Age of sixty Years "shall have Bows and Arrows for shooting". Men-Children between Seven "Years and Seventeen shall have a Bow and 2 Shafts". Men about Seventeen "Years of Age shall keep a Bow and 4 Arrows". The penalty for nonobservance was set at 6s.8d.

Archery, which had been the key to Henry V's victory at the 1415 Battle of Agincourt, had been required of the labourers, servants, artificers, or victualers as early as 1388 (12 Ric. 2. c. 6) and 1409 (11 Hen. 4. c. 4), and again in the Archery Act 1511 (3 Hen. 8. c. 3) and the Archery Act 1514 (6 Hen. 8. c. 2), among others. In fact, the law of 1409 had as punishment six days' imprisonment; and reference is made herein to an act in the Parliament at Canterbury of Richard the Lionheart.

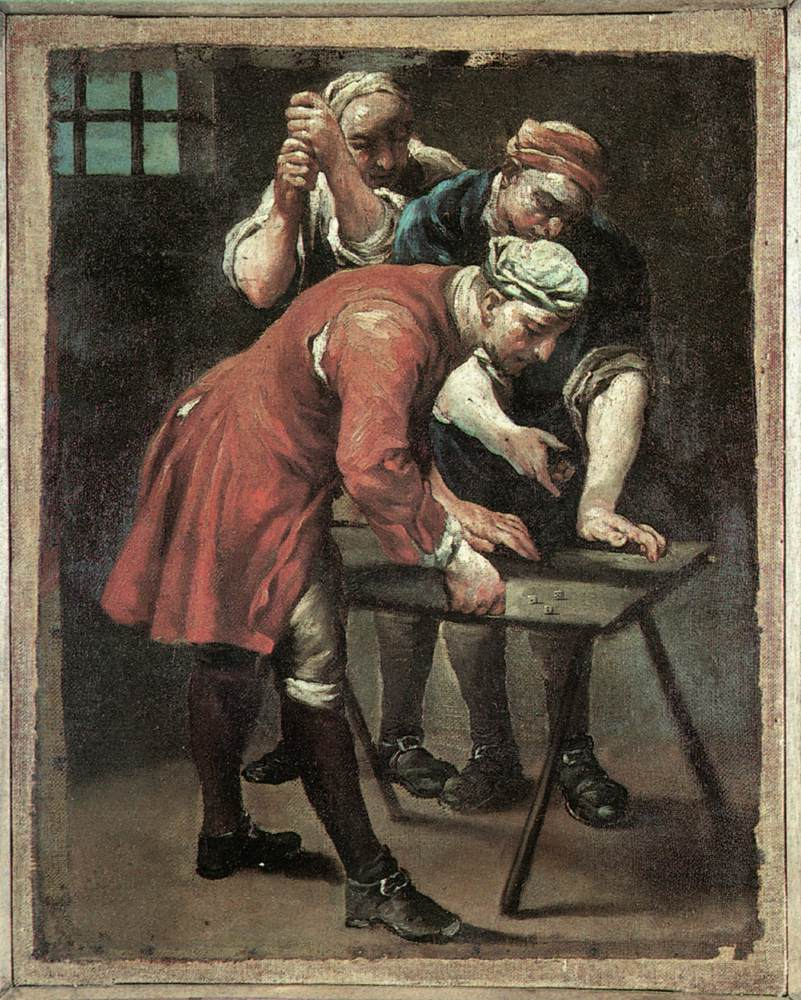
18th century dice players

== Subsequent developments ==
Section 1 of the Gaming Act 1845 (8 & 9 Vict. c. 109) repealed much of the act.

Sections 14 and 17 of the act were repealed by section 1 of, and the schedule to, the Statute Law Revision Act 1863 (26 & 27 Vict. c. 125), which came into force on 28 July 1863.

The Statute Law Revision Act 1948 repealed sections 11 to 13, part of section 8, and the preambulatory words "by reason therof Archerie ys sore decayed, and dayly is lyke to be more mynished..." Archery could not compete with the nefarious pursuits of cricket, dicing, and carding.

The remainder of the whole act was repealed by section 15 of, and part I of schedule 6 to, the Betting and Gaming Act 1960 (8 & 9 Eliz. 2. c. 60).

The act forbade all sport on Christmas Day with the exception of archery practice, meaning that footballers who played on Christmas Day before 1960, when the Football League routinely scheduled fixtures for 25 December, had technically broken the law.

== Section 5 ==
This is section 7 in Ruffhead's Edition. It was of a local character.

== See also ==
- History of gambling in the United Kingdom
- List of acts of the Parliament of England
