= Disorderly Houses Act 1751 =

Act of the Parliament of Great Britain

Disorderly Houses Act 1751 (Note: The citation of this act by this short title was authorised by section 1 of, and the first schedule to, the Short Titles Act 1896. Due to the repeal of those provisions it is now authorised by section 19(2) of the Interpretation Act 1978.)
- Act of Parliament
- Parliament of Great Britain
- Long title: An Act for the better preventing Thefts and Roberries, and for regulating Places of publick Entertainment, and punishing Persons keeping disorderly Houses.
- Citation: 25 Geo. 2. c. 36
- Territorial extent: England and Wales; Scotland

Dates
- Royal assent: 26 March 1752
- Commencement: 1 June 1752 (Note: Section 1.)
- Expired: 14 November 1754 (Note: Made perpetual by the Thefts, Robberies, etc. Act 1755 (28 Geo. 2. c. 19).)
- Repealed: 21 July 2008
Other legislation
Amended by	Thefts, Robberies, etc. Act 1755; Criminal Law Act 1826; Criminal Statutes Repeal Act 1828; Criminal Law (India) Act 1828; Statute Law Revision Act 1867; Statute Law Revision Act 1888; Short Titles Act 1896; Betting and Gaming Act 1960; London Government Act 1963; Administration of Justice Act 1965; Statute Law Revision Act 1966; Courts Act 1971; Magistrates' Courts Act 1980; Licensing Act 2003
Repealed by	Statute Law (Repeals) Act 2008

Status: Repealed

Text of statute as originally enacted

Revised text of statute as amended

The Disorderly Houses Act 1751 (25 Geo. 2. c. 36) was an act of the Parliament of Great Britain. It made provision in relation to disorderly houses. Most of it had been repealed by the mid-twentieth century, but one section, section 8, survived until 2008.

== Provisions ==
Section 3 of the act provided that the act would remain in force until the end of the next session of parliament three years after the start of the present session of parliament.

=== Section 8 ===
Immediately before its repeal this section read:

And whereas, by reason of the many subtle and crafty contrivances of persons keeping bawdy-houses,... , or other disorderly houses, it is difficult to prove who is the real owner or keeper thereof, by which means many notorious offenders have escaped punishment any person who shall at any time hereafter appear, act, or behave him or herself as master or mistress, or as the person having the care, government, or management of any bawdy-house,... , or other disorderly house, shall be deemed and taken to be the keeper thereof, and shall be liable to be prosecuted and punished as such, notwithstanding he or she shall not in fact be the real owner or keeper thereof.

The words omitted were repealed by section 15 of, and part I of schedule 6 to, the Betting and Gaming Act 1960 (8 & 9 Eliz. 2. c. 60).

Offences under this section were triable either way.

From 2003 until its repeal, the act did not apply in relation to relevant premises within the meaning of section 159 of the Licensing Act 2003.

== Subsequent developments ==
The whole act was made perpetual by section 1 of the Thefts, Robberies, etc. Act 1755 (28 Geo. 2. c. 19).

Section 1, 9, 11, 12 and 15 of the act were repealed by section 1 of, and the schedule to, the Statute Law Revision Act 1867 (30 & 31 Vict. c. 59), which came into force on 15 July 1867.

Sections 2 to 4 of the act were repealed by the section 93(1) of, and part II of schedule 18 to, the London Government Act 1963, which came into force on 1 April 1965.

Sections 5 to 7 of the act were repealed by section 34(1) of, and schedule 2 to, the Administration of Justice Act 1965, which came into force on 27 April 1965.

Section 10 of the act was repealed by section 56(4) of, and part IV of schedule 11 to, the Courts Act 1971, which came into force on 1 January 1972.

Section 8 of the act was repealed by section 1(1) of, and part III of schedule 1 to, the Statute Law (Repeals) Act 2008, which came into force on 21 July 2008.

== See also ==
- Halsbury's Statutes
