= Betting, Gaming and Lotteries Act 1963 =

Act of the Parliament of the United Kingdom

Betting, Gaming and Lotteries Act 1963 (Note: Section 58(1).)
- Act of Parliament
- Parliament of the United Kingdom
- Long title: An Act to consolidate certain enactments relating to betting, gaming, lotteries and connected matters.
- Citation: 1963 c. 2
- Territorial extent: England and Wales; Scotland; (Note: Section 58(2).)

Dates
- Royal assent: 28 February 1963
- Commencement: 28 March 1963 (Note: Section 58(3).)
- Repealed: 1 September 2007 (Note: The Gambling Act 2005 (Commencement No. 6 and Transitional Provisions) Order 2006 (SI 2006/3272).)
Other legislation
Amends	See § Repealed enactments
Repeals/revokes	See § Repealed enactments
Amended by	London Government Act 1963; Licensing Act 1964; Family Law Reform Act 1969; Late Night Refreshment Houses Act 1969; Statute Law (Repeals) Act 1974; Lotteries and Amusements Act 1976; Law Reform (Miscellaneous Provisions) (Scotland) Act 1980; Employment Tribunals Act 1996; Employment Rights Act 1996
Repealed by	Gambling Act 2005
Relates to	Betting Duties Act 1963

Status: Repealed

Text of statute as originally enacted

Revised text of statute as amended

The Betting, Gaming and Lotteries Act 1963 (c. 2) was an act of the Parliament of the United Kingdom that consolidated enactments relating to betting, gaming, lotteries and connected matters in Great Britain.

== Provisions ==
=== Repealed enactments ===
Section 57(1) of the act repealed 13 enactments, listed in schedule 8 to the act.

Enactments repealed by section 57(1)
Citation	Short title	Extent of repeal
55 & 56 Vict. c. 4	Betting and Loans (Infants) Act 1892	Section 1. In section 3, the words "as in the preceding sections or either of them mentioned".
6 Edw. 7. c. 43	Street Betting Act 1906	The whole act.
18 & 19 Geo. 5. c. 41	Racecourse Betting Act 1928	The whole act.
24 & 25 Geo. 5. c. 58	Betting and Lotteries Act 1934	The whole act except section 25(1) and (2).
10 & 11 Geo. 6. c. 51	Town and Country Planning Act 1947	So much of Schedule 8 as relates to the Betting and Lotteries Act 1934.
10 & 11 Geo. 6. c. 53	Town and Country Planning (Scotland) Act 1947	So much of Schedule 8 as relates to the Betting and Lotteries Act 1934.
11 & 12 Geo. 6. c. 9	Finance (No. 2) Act 1947	Section 6(3).
11 & 12 Geo. 6. c. 49	Finance Act 1948	In Schedule 6, paragraph 3(2).
2 & 3 Eliz. 2. c. 33	Pool Betting Act 1954	The whole act.
4 & 5 Eliz. 2. c. 45	Small Lotteries and Gaming Act 1956	The whole act except section 5(2).
8 & 9 Eliz. 2. c. 60	Betting and Gaming Act 1960	The whole act except paragraph 7 of Schedule 4, and in the said paragraph 7 the words from "and nothing" to "negotiating of".
9 & 10 Eliz. 2. c. 17	Betting Levy Act 1961	The whole act except sections 1(11), 9, 10(1) and 10(3).
10 & 11 Eliz. 2. c. 55	Lotteries and Gaming Act 1962	The whole act.

== Subsequent developments ==
Section 57(1) of, and schedule 8 to, the act were repealed by section 1 of, and part XI of the schedule to, the Statute Law (Repeals) Act 1974, which came into force on 27 June 1974.

The whole act was repealed by section 356(3)(f) of the Gambling Act 2005, which came into force on 1 September 2007.
