= Partnership Act 1890 =

Act of the Parliament of the United Kingdom

Partnership Act 1890 (Note: Section 50.)
- Act of Parliament
- Parliament of the United Kingdom
- Long title: An Act to declare and amend the Law of Partnership.
- Citation: 53 & 54 Vict. c. 39
- Territorial extent: United Kingdom

Dates
- Royal assent: 14 August 1890
- Commencement: 1 January 1891 (Note: Section 49.)
Other legislation
Amends	Mercantile Law Amendment Act 1856
Amended by	Statute Law Revision Act 1908; Mental Health Act 1959; Courts Act 1971; Trusts of Land and Appointment of Trustees Act 1996; Statute Law (Repeals) Act 1998; Economic Crime and Corporate Transparency Act 2023

Status: Amended

Text of statute as originally enacted

Revised text of statute as amended

Text of the Partnership Act 1890 as in force today (including any amendments) within the United Kingdom, from legislation.gov.uk.

The Partnership Act 1890 (53 & 54 Vict. c. 39) is an act of the Parliament of the United Kingdom which governs the rights and duties of people or corporate entities conducting business in partnership. A partnership is defined in the act as 'the relation which subsists between persons carrying on a business in common with a view of profit.'

== Main provisions ==
A partnership can arise through conduct, oral agreement, or a written contract known as a partnership agreement. The minimum membership is two and the maximum is unlimited since 2002. The provisions of the Partnership Act 1890 apply unless expressly or implicitly excluded by agreement of the partners. Each partner is entitled to participate in management, get an equal share of profit, an indemnity in respect of liabilities assumed in the course of business and the right to not be expelled by other partners. A partnership ends on the death of a partner, unless an agreement is made prior to the deaths.

== Complexities ==
=== Liability of partners ===
In England partners are jointly liable for the debts and obligations of the firm whilst they are a partner. Where a partner has died, their estate also becomes severally liable. In Scotland partners are both jointly and severally liable. Where there has been a wrongful act or omission, or a misapplication of money or property in receipt, every partner is jointly and severally liable.

== See also ==
- United Kingdom partnership law
- Limited Liability Partnerships Act 2000
