= Disorderly house =

Place where public order is disturbed

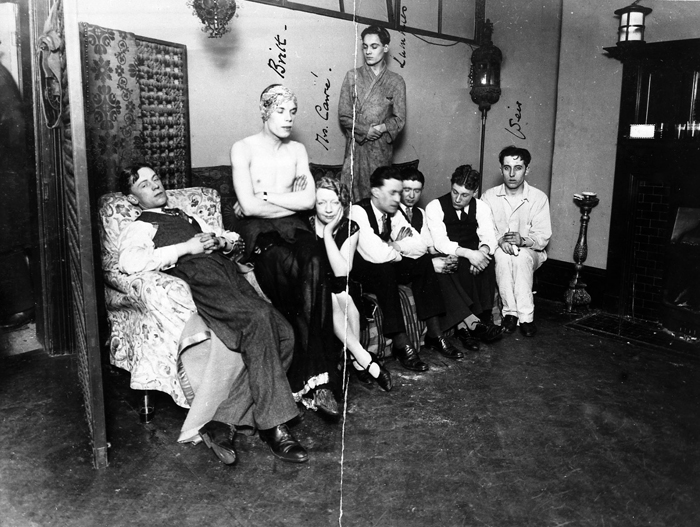
Photograph used in evidence for a prosecution for "keeping a disorderly house" in a flat in London's Fitzroy Square, in 1926

In English criminal law, a disorderly house is a house in which the conduct of its inhabitants is such as to become a public nuisance, or outrages public decency, or tends to corrupt or deprave, or injures the public interest; or a house where persons congregate to the probable disturbance of the public peace or other commission of crime. To persistently or habitually keep a disorderly house is an offence against the common law, punishable by fine or imprisonment.

The usual charge for keeping a brothel where prostitution can be proven, for instance, is under section 33A of the Sexual Offences Act 1956, keeping a brothel for prostitution, and the penalty is up to six months if proceeding summarily or seven years if by indictment. (The definition of a brothel in English law has been held to be "a place where people of opposite sexes are allowed to resort for illicit intercourse, whether ... common prostitutes or not" and thus prostitution need not form part of the picture; a soapland is, in the eyes of the law of England, a brothel without prostitution.) Brothel-keeping can, however, also be charged as keeping a disorderly house (contrary to the common law rather than any written statute), and is then punishable by an unlimited fine, and unlimited imprisonment.

The "operator" of a crack house or opium den can also be charged with keeping a disorderly house, as can the owner/operator of an illegal gambling establishment, as well as the owner of a speakeasy, "blind tiger", or "boozecan" (unlicensed bar or pub). Modern vice laws, regulating such things as drinking, gambling, dancing, and drugs, have resulted in calls for the offence of keeping a disorderly house to be abolished.

As brothel-keeping is one of the most common causes for the charge of keeping a disorderly house, "disorderly house" has become something of a euphemism for brothel in the English legal community; brothel or "disorderly house"-related statutory offences can be found under sections 33 to 36 of the Sexual Offences Act 1956, as well as in sections 51A to 56 of the Sexual Offences Act 2003. These are, however, not to be confused with the common law offence of keeping a disorderly house.

== History ==
There were formerly statutory provisions relating to disorderly houses under:

- the Disorderly Houses Act 1751.
- sections 1 and 2 of the Sunday Observance Act 1780.

Both acts have been repealed in the UK (Statute Law (Repeals) Act 2008 and Licensing Act 2003).

== See also ==
- Opium den
- Crack house
