= Companies (Audit, Investigations and Community Enterprise) Act 2004 =

Act of the Parliament of the United Kingdom

Companies (Audit, Investigations and Community Enterprise) Act 2004 (Note: Section 67.)
- Act of Parliament
- Parliament of the United Kingdom
- Long title: An Act to amend the law relating to company auditors and accounts, to the provision that may be made in respect of certain liabilities incurred by a company’s officers, and to company investigations; to make provision for community interest companies; and for connected purposes.
- Citation: 2004 c. 27
- Territorial extent: England and Wales; Scotland; Northern Ireland (in part); (Note: Section 66.)

Dates
- Royal assent: 28 October 2004
- Commencement: Various (Note: Section 16.) (Note: Section 67.) (Note: The Companies (Audit, Investigations and Community Enterprise) Act 2004 (Commencement) and Companies Act 1989 (Commencement No 18) Order 2004 (S.I. 2004/3322 (C. 154)) was made under this section.)
Other legislation
Amends	House of Commons Disqualification Act 1975; Youth Justice and Criminal Evidence Act 1999; Limited Liability Partnerships Act 2000; Anti-terrorism, Crime and Security Act 2001
Amended by	Charities Act 2011; Co-operative and Community Benefit Societies Act 2014; Pensions Act 2014; Sentencing Act 2020; Digital Markets, Competition and Consumers Act 2024

Status: Amended

Text of statute as originally enacted

Revised text of statute as amended

The Companies (Audit, Investigations and Community Enterprise) Act 2004 (c. 27), sometimes called CAICE, is an act of the Parliament of the United Kingdom that regulates certain practices in financial record keeping and reporting for companies.

== Background ==
The following consultation documents and reports are precursors of this act:

- The "Final Report of the Co-ordinating Group on Audit and Accounting Issues" to the Secretary of State for Trade and Industry and the Chancellor of the Exchequer, published in January 2003
- "Review of the Regulatory Regime of the Accountancy Profession: Legislative Proposals", published in March 2003, and the "Report on the public consultation and the Government's conclusions", published in February 2004
- The consultation document "Company Investigations: Powers for the 21st Century" published in October 2001
- The consultation document "Enterprise for Communities: proposals for a Community Interest Company", published in March 2003, and the "Report on the public consultation and the Government's intentions", published in October 2003
- The consultation document "Director and Auditor Liability" published in December 2003

The two purposes of the legislation were

- to ensure that the United Kingdom avoided scandals similar to the Enron scandal or the Worldcom scandal.
- to reform companies legislation to provide a governance framework for certain social enterprises, which placed less emphasis on profit-making

== Provisions ==
=== Reform of audit and investigations ===
The act reformed companies legislation to tighten the regulation of accounting practices.

In 2005, Griffiths compared the powers to require documents, under section 21 of this act, and to enter and remain on premises, under section 23 thereof, to the novel Nineteen Eighty-Four.

=== Community interest companies ===
The act introduced community interest companies, and the officer known as the Regulator of Community Interest Companies.

Community interest companies are designed to serve the public interest without the strict governance requirements of charities. The main difference between a normal company and a community interest company is that a community interest company has an asset lock.

== Reception ==
In 2005 and 2013, Mäntysaari and McLaughlin said this Act is important. It is comparable to the US Sarbanes–Oxley Act. The Conservative spokesperson, Andrew Mitchell, criticised the government for not embarking on a wholesale reform of company law.

== Community Interest Company Regulations 2005 ==
The Community Interest Company Regulations 2005 (SI 2005/1788) were made under powers conferred by this Act.

== See also ==
- Companies Act
