= Betting and Lotteries Act 1934 =

Act of the Parliament of the United Kingdom

Betting and Lotteries Act 1934 (Note: Section 33(1).)
- Act of Parliament
- Parliament of the United Kingdom
- Long title: An Act to amend the law with respect to betting on tracks where sporting events take place, including the law with respect to totalisators on horse racecourses; to authorise, subject to restrictions, the establishment of totalisators on dog racecourses; to prohibit betting on tracks with young persons and pari mutuel betting except by authorised totalisators; to amend the law with respect to lotteries and certain prize competitions; and for purposes connected with the matters aforesaid.
- Citation: 24 & 25 Geo. 5. c. 58
- Territorial extent: England and Wales; Scotland; (Note: Section 33(3).)

Dates
- Royal assent: 16 November 1934
- Commencement: 1 January 1935: in part; 1 July 1935: rest of act; (Note: Section 33(2).)
- Repealed: 22 July 2004
Other legislation
Repeals/revokes	Suppression of Lotteries Act 1698; Lotteries Act 1710; Lotteries Act 1721; Lotteries Act 1732; Gaming Act 1802; Lotteries Act 1806; Lotteries Act 1823; Lotteries Act 1836; Lotteries Act 1845
Amended by	Betting, Gaming and Lotteries Act 1963
Repealed by	Statute Law (Repeals) Act 2004
Relates to	Betting and Lotteries Act (Northern Ireland) 1957

Status: Repealed

Text of statute as originally enacted

Revised text of statute as amended

The Betting and Lotteries Act 1934 (24 & 25 Geo. 5. c. 58) was an act of the Parliament of the United Kingdom and had three sections: Betting, Lotteries and Prize Competitions, and General.

The draft bill was presented to Parliament on 7 March with the provisions passed on 27 March.

== Overview ==
=== Betting ===
Horse racing courses and greyhound tracks were forced to limit their race days to a maximum 104 per annum whereas previously they were able to race on an unlimited basis. On course bookmakers and totalisators were also restricted to betting on a maximum of 104 days per annum.

Power was given to local councils to issue (and revoke or refuse) the betting licences required and the 104 appointed days of trading must be published in advance. The racecourse and tracks were to charge on course bookmakers a specified admission price and it was illegal for under 18 to be involved in any betting organisation.

The issue of street bookmaking was not addressed which the press felt should have been. The restriction to 104 days was primarily brought in due to rapid growth of greyhound tracks after 1927 and the associated gambling implications that had followed.

=== Lotteries and prize competitions ===
All lotteries were made unlawful with the exemption of small lotteries incidental to certain entertainment and private lotteries. Restrictions were made on certain prize competitions (i.e. in newspapers) and warrant rights were given to any constable to investigate premises that are suspected of breaking the restrictions.

This was primarily directed to combat the Irish Free State Hospitals' Sweepstake.

== Provisions ==
=== Part 1 - Betting ===
- 1. Restriction of betting on tracks.
- 2. Restriction of bookmaking on tracks.
- 3. Restriction of pari mutuel or pool betting.
- 4. Restriction of betting on dog racecourses.
- 5. Licensing authorities.
- 6. Notices of, and procedure with respect to, applications for licences.
- 7. Discretion of licensing authority as to, grant of licences.
- 8. Special provisions as to first licences for certain existing tracks.
- 9. Duration and transfer of licences and fees in respect of licences and transfers.
- 10. Fixing of days on which betting facilities may be provided.
- 11. Establishment of totalisators on dog racecourses.
- 12. Facilities for bookmaking on tracks.
- 13. Charges to bookmakers on tracks 'where betting facilities are lawfully provided.
- 14. Occupiers of tracks not to have an interest in bookmaking thereon.
- 15. Betting with young persons, and employment of young persons in betting businesses, prohibited on tracks.
- 16. Revocation of licences.
- 17. Saving for right of occupier of track to prohibit betting.
- 18. Amendment and interpretation of Racecourse Betting Act, 1928.
- 19. Power of entry on tracks.
- 20. Interpretation of Part I.

=== Part 2 - Lotteries and Prize Competitions ===
- 21. Illegality of lotteries.
- 22. Offences in connection with lotteries.
- 23. Exemption of small lotteries incidental to certain entertainments.
- 24. Exemption of private lotteries.
- 25. Amendment of the law with respect to, and saving for, lotteries of Art Unions.
- 26. Restriction on certain prize competitions.
- 27. Power to issue search warrant.
- 28. Interpretation of Part II.

=== Part 3 - General ===
- 29. Offences by bodies corporate.
- 30. Penalties for offences under this Act, and forfeitures.
- 31. Application to Scotland.
- 32. Repeal.
- 33. Short title, commencement and extent.

== Subsequent developments ==
The whole act, except section 25(1) and (2), was repealed by section 57(1) of, and schedule 8 to, the Betting, Gaming and Lotteries Act 1963, which came into force on 28 March 1963.

The whole act was repealed by section 1(1) of, and group 3 of part 17 of schedule 1 to, the Statute Law (Repeals) Act 2004, which came into force on 22 July 2004.

== See also ==
- History of gambling in the United Kingdom
