= Gaming Act 1710 =

Act of the Parliament of Great Britain

Gaming Act 1710 (Note: The citation of this act by this short title was authorised by section 1 of, and the first schedule to, the Short Titles Act 1896. Due to the repeal of those provisions, it is now authorised by section 19(2) of the Interpretation Act 1978.)
- Act of Parliament
- Parliament of Great Britain
- Long title: An Act for better preventing of excessive and deceitful Gaming.
- Citation: 9 Ann. c. 19 (Note: This is the citation in The Statutes of the Realm.); 9 Ann. c. 14 (Note: This is the citation in The Statutes at Large.)
- Territorial extent: Great Britain

Dates
- Royal assent: 16 May 1711
- Commencement: 1 May 1711 (Note: Section 1.)
- Repealed: 1 September 2007 (Note: The Gambling Act 2005 (Commencement No. 6 and Transitional Provisions) Order 2006 (SI 2006/3272).)
Other legislation
Amended by	Offences Against the Person Act 1828; Criminal Law (India) Act 1828
Repealed by	Gambling Act 2005
Relates to	Gaming Act 1968

Status: Repealed

Text of statute as originally enacted

Revised text of statute as amended

The Gaming Act 1710 (9 Ann. c. 19) was an act of the Parliament of Great Britain.

== Subsequent developments ==
The act was largely superseded by the Gaming Act 1968.

The whole act was repealed by sections 356(3)(a) and (4) of, and schedule 17 to, the Gambling Act 2005, which came into force on 1 September 2007. Section 1 of the act ceased to have effect by virtue of section 334(1)(a) of the 2005 act.

== United States ==
=== District of Columbia ===
In the District of Columbia, a version of the Act (commonly referred to as the 'Statute of Anne') remained part of the D.C. Code.

Under the modern D.C. version of the law, a gambler who loses more than $25 may sue within three months to recover losses. If the gambler does not sue within that period, another person may bring an action to recover treble damages, with half of any recovery payable to the District of Columbia.

The statute drew renewed public attention in 2025 after a Delaware-based entity, DC Gambling Recovery LLC, filed federal lawsuits against several major sports betting operators, including DraftKings, BetMGM, and Caesars Sportsbook. The lawsuits argued that despite the legalization of sports betting in the District in 2018, the Statute of Anne’s recovery provisions remained in force. In response, the D.C. Council passed legislation clarifying that the Statute of Anne did not apply to legalized sports wagering in the District.

=== U.S. States ===
Similar lawsuits based on the same Statute of Anne theory have also been recently brought against prediction market and gambling operators in several U.S. states, including Ohio, Kentucky, Illinois, South Carolina, Massachusetts, and Georgia.

== See also ==
- History of gambling in the United Kingdom
