= Limited Liability Partnerships Act (Northern Ireland) 2002 =

- Act of the Northern Ireland Assembly
- Northern Ireland Assembly
- Long title: An Act to make provision for limited liability partnerships
- Citation: 2002 c. 12 (N.I.)
- Territorial extent: Northern Ireland

Dates
- Royal assent: 22 November 2002
- Commencement: 22 November 2002 (partially); 13 September 2004 (remainder)

Other legislation
- Repealed by: Companies Act 2006
- Relates to: Limited Liability Partnerships Act 2000

Status: Repealed

Text of statute as originally enacted

The Limited Liability Partnerships Act (Northern Ireland) 2002 (c. 12 (N.I.)) is an act of the Northern Ireland Assembly which introduced the concept of the limited liability partnership (LLP) into Northern Irish law, passed two years after the Limited Liability Partnerships Act 2000 introduced the concept into the law of England and Wales and Scots law. The Limited Liability Partnerships Act (Northern Ireland) 2002 largely mirrored the Limited Liability Partnerships Act 2000.

It created an LLP as a body with legal personality separate from its members (unlike a normal partnership) which is governed under a hybrid system of law partially from company law and partially from partnership law. Unlike normal partnerships the liability of members of an LLP on winding-up is limited to the amount of capital they contributed to the LLP.

== Implementation ==
According to the Belfast Telegraph, the birth of the new business structure occurred in June 2003, but the structure itself was only established in November 2004.
