= Gambling Act 2005 =

Act of the Parliament of the United Kingdom

Gambling Act 2005 (Note: Section 362.)
- Act of Parliament
- Parliament of the United Kingdom
- Long title: An Act to make provision about gambling.
- Citation: 2005 c. 19
- Introduced by: Tessa Jowell, Secretary of State for Culture, Media and Sport (Commons); Lord McIntosh of Haringey, Parliamentary-Under Secretary of State for Media and Heritage (Lords)
- Territorial extent: England and Wales; Scotland; Northern Ireland (sections 43, 331 and 340); (Note: Section 361.)

Dates
- Royal assent: 7 April 2005
- Commencement: Various (Note: Section 358.)
Other legislation
Amends	Metropolitan Police Act 1839; Libraries Offences Act 1898; Police Act 1964; Theft Act 1968; Family Law Reform Act 1969; Courts Act 1971; House of Commons Disqualification Act 1975; Criminal Law Act 1977; Senior Courts Act 1981; Betting and Gaming Duties Act 1981; Courts and Legal Services Act 1990; Coal Industry Act 1994; National Lottery etc. Act 1993; Terrorism Act 2000
Repeals/revokes	Gaming Act 1710; Gaming Act 1738; Gaming Act 1835; Gaming Act 1845; Gaming Act 1892; Betting, Gaming and Lotteries Act 1963; Gaming Act 1968; Gaming (Amendment) Act 1973; Lotteries Act 1975; Lotteries and Amusements Act 1976; Gaming (Amendment) Act 1980; Gaming (Amendment) Act 1982; Lotteries (Amendment) Act 1984; Betting, Gaming and Lotteries (Amendment) Act 1984; Betting, Gaming and Lotteries (Amendment) Act 1985; Gaming (Amendment) Act 1986; Gaming (Amendment) Act 1987; Gaming (Amendment) Act 1990; Bingo Act 1992
Amended by	Charities Act 2011; Scotland Act 2016; Wales Act 2017; Covert Human Intelligence Sources (Criminal Conduct) Act 2021

Status: Amended

Text of statute as originally enacted

Revised text of statute as amended

The Gambling Act 2005 (c. 19) is an act of the Parliament of the United Kingdom enacted under the Labour government of Tony Blair. It mainly applies to England and Wales, and to Scotland, and is designed to control all forms of gambling. It transfers authority for licensing gambling from the magistrates' courts to local authorities (specifically unitary authorities, and the councils of metropolitan borough, non-metropolitan district and London boroughs), or to Scottish licensing boards. The act also created the Gambling Commission.

== Provisions ==
The act gives its objectives as

1. preventing gambling from being a source of crime or disorder, being associated with crime or disorder or being used to support crime,
2. ensuring that gambling is conducted in a fair and open way, and
3. protecting children and other vulnerable persons from being harmed or exploited by gambling.

Some provisions of the bill faced controversy, particularly in its original form, where it would have allowed eight so-called "super casinos" to be set up. With the parliamentary session drawing to a close, a compromise was agreed to reduce this to one. Despite a lengthy bidding process, with Manchester being chosen as the single planned location, the development was cancelled soon after Gordon Brown became Prime Minister of the United Kingdom. The act also specifically regulates Internet gambling for the first time.

One of the biggest changes was the removal of the "debt of honour" exemption which stopped people from taking legal action over unpaid winnings (which had been law since the Gaming Act 1845). Under the 2005 act's section 335 "Enforceability of gambling contracts", punters were now able to take legal action over unpaid winnings in a court of law.

The law permits gambling companies to advertise on television and radio.

The act is wide-ranging including regulation of lotteries. The "no purchase necessary" clause on on-product promotions and semi-legal competitions went, replaced with the so-called "New Zealand Model" where purchase may be a requirement, if the purchase is at the "normal selling price".

The act, together with regulations and specifications developed by the Gambling Commission, define and in some cases redefine, categories of gaming machines and where they are allowed to be placed.

== 2014 amendments ==
From 1 December 2014, the Gambling (Licensing and Advertising) Act 2014 made several updates to the Act, including a requirement that all off-shore gambling brands apply for a licence from the Gambling Commission and submit to a 15% point of consumption (POC) tax on gross profits.

== 2021 review ==
On 8 December 2020, the UK government announced a review of the act, to "make sure it is fit for the digital age". The announcement included a call for evidence, with a deadline at the end of March 2021.

== See also ==
- Gaming Act 1845
- Gaming law
- Gambling in the United Kingdom
