= List of statutory rules of Northern Ireland, 1987 =

This is an incomplete list of statutory rules of Northern Ireland in 1987.

== 1-100 ==
- General Medical and Pharmaceutical Services (Amendment) Regulations (Northern Ireland) 1987 (SR(NI) 1987/1)
- Animals (Scientific Procedures) (Procedure for Representations) Rules (Northern Ireland) 1987 (SR(NI) 1987/2)
- Prohibition of Traffic (Donegall Place, Belfast) Order (Northern Ireland) 1987 (SR(NI) 1987/4)
- Supplementary Benefit (Requirements and Resources) (Amendment) Regulations (Northern Ireland) 1987 (SR(NI) 1987/5)
- Betting, Gaming, Lotteries and Amusements (1985 Order) (Commencement No. 2) Order (Northern Ireland) 1987 (SR(NI) 1987/6)
- Gaming (Form of Bingo Club Licence) Regulations (Northern Ireland) 1987 (SR(NI) 1987/7)
- Gaming, (Bingo) Regulations (Northern Ireland) 1987 (SR(NI) 1987/8)
- Potatoes (Prohibition on Landing) Order (Northern Ireland) 1987 (SR(NI) 1987/9)
- Social Security (Hospital In-Patients) (Amendment) Regulations (Northern Ireland) 1987 (SR(NI) 1987/12)
- Supplementary Benefit (Single Payments) (Amendment) Regulations (Northern Ireland) 1987 (SR(NI) 1987/13)
- Family Income Supplements (Computation) Regulations (Northern Ireland) 1987 (SR(NI) 1987/14)
- Supplementary Benefit Up-Rating Regulations (Northern Ireland) 1987 (SR(NI) 1987/15)

== 401-500 ==
- Income Support (General) Regulations (Northern Ireland) 1987 (SR(NI) 1987/459)

== Sources ==
- Northern Ireland Statutory Rules 1987 Part I. Her Majesty's Stationery Office. 1987. ISBN 978-0-337-90187-4.
- Northern Ireland Statutory Rules 1987 Part II. Her Majesty's Stationery Office. 1987.
- "Northern Ireland Statutory Rules from 1987". legislation.gov.uk.
