= Betting and Gaming Act 1960 =

Act of the Parliament of the United Kingdom

Betting and Gaming Act 1960 (Note: Section 1.)
- Act of Parliament
- Parliament of the United Kingdom
- Long title: An Act to amend the law with respect to betting and gaming and to make certain other amendments with a view to securing consistency and uniformity in, and facilitating the consolidation of, the said law and the law with respect to lotteries; and for purposes connected with the matters aforesaid.
- Citation: 8 & 9 Eliz. 2. c. 60
- Territorial extent: England and Wales; Scotland; (Note: Section 54(1).)

Dates
- Royal assent: 29 July 1960
- Commencement: 1 December 1961: Section 6 and 29(3) and part II of the sixth schedule as relates to the Street Betting Act 1906 (Note: The Betting and Gaming Act, 1960 (Commencement No. 2) Order 1961.)
- Repealed: 1 October 1969 (Note: The Gaming Act 1968 (Commencement No. 4) Order 1969.)
Other legislation
Amends	Disorderly Houses Act 1751; Metropolitan Police Act 1839; City of London Police Act 1839
Repeals/revokes	Unlawful Games Act 1541; Betting Act 1853; Betting Act 1874; Betting and Lotteries Act 1934
Amended by	Betting Duties Act 1963
Repealed by	Betting, Gaming and Lotteries Act 1963
Relates to	Gaming Act 1968

Status: Repealed

Records of Parliamentary debate relating to the statute from Hansard

Text of statute as originally enacted

The Betting and Gaming Act 1960 (8 & 9 Eliz. 2. c. 60) was an act of the Parliament of the United Kingdom that legalised additional forms of gambling in the United Kingdom. It was passed on 1 September 1960 and came into effect on 1 January 1961.

== Provisions ==
Based on the recommendations of the Royal Commission on Betting, Lotteries and Gaming, 1949–51, the act came into force on 1 January 1961 and first allowed gambling for small sums in games of skill such as bridge. From May 1961 betting shops were allowed to open.

Until 1965 about 16,000 licences were granted by local magistrates.

=== Commencement, short title and extent ===
Section 31(1) of the act provided that the act may be cited as the "Betting and Gaming Act, 1960".

Section 31(2) of the act provided that the act would not extend to Northern Ireland.

Section 31(3) of the act provided that the act would come into force on the appointed day.

Betting and Gaming Act 1960 (Commencement No. 1) Order 1960
- Statutory Instrument
- Parliament of the United Kingdom
- Citation: SI 1960/1556

Dates
- Made: 26 August 1960
Other legislation
Made under	Betting and Gaming Act 1960

Status: Current legislation

Text of statute as originally enacted

The Betting and Gaming Act 1960 (Commencement No. 1) Order 1960 (SI 1960/1556) provided the commencement date for the majority of the act.

Betting and Gaming Act 1960 (Commencement No. 2) Order 1961
- Statutory Instrument
- Parliament of the United Kingdom
- Citation: SI 1961/2092

Dates
- Made: 26 October 1961
Other legislation
Made under	Betting and Gaming Act 1960

Status: Current legislation

Text of statute as originally enacted

The Betting and Gaming Act 1960 (Commencement No. 2) Order 1961 (SI 1961/2092) provided that section 6 and the consequential repeal of section 1(3) of the Street Betting Act 1906 (6 Edw. 7. c. 43) by section 29(3) and part II of the sixth schedule to the act, would come in to force on 1 December 1961.

== Aim ==
The aim of the act was to take gambling off the street and end the practice of runners (employed by bookmakers) collecting from punters, a move welcomed by the clergy. Fines would be imposed at a later date on any street gambling.

== Consequences ==
The opening of betting shops affected the greyhound racing industry in the United Kingdom with attendances suffering throughout Britain. From 1961–1969 there were 21 National Greyhound Racing Club (NGRC) registered track closures and many independent (unaffiliated to a governing body) track closures. The act is regarded as one of the primary reasons for the decline of greyhound racing with 91 NGRC track closures alone recorded from 1960–2010.

== See also ==
- History of gambling in the United Kingdom
