= Limited Liability Partnerships Act 2000 =

Act of the Parliament of the United Kingdom

Limited Liability Partnerships Act 2000 (Note: Section 19(5).)
- Act of Parliament
- Parliament of the United Kingdom
- Long title: An Act to make provision for limited liability partnerships.
- Citation: 2000 c. 12
- Territorial extent: England and Wales; Scotland; Northern Ireland (ss. 10-13); (Note: Section 19(4).)

Dates
- Royal assent: 20 July 2000
- Commencement: 20 July 2000 (section 19); 6 April 2001 (rest of act); (Note: Section 19(1)–(2). The Limited Liability Partnerships Act 2000 (Commencement) Order 2000 (SI 2000/3316).)
Other legislation
Amends	Inheritance Tax Act 1984; Companies Act 1985; Income and Corporation Taxes Act 1988; Social Security Contributions and Benefits Act 1992; Social Security Contributions and Benefits (Northern Ireland) Act 1992
Amended by	Open-Ended Investment Companies Regulations 2001; Companies (Audit, Investigations and Community Enterprise) Act 2004; Companies Act 2006; Income Tax Act 2007; Limited Liability Partnerships (Application of Companies Act 2006) Regulations 2009; Corporation Tax Act 2010; Limited Liability Partnerships (Register of People with Significant Control) Regulations 2016; Bankruptcy (Scotland) Act 2016 (Consequential Provisions and Modifications) Order 2016; Corporate Insolvency and Governance Act 2020; Limited Liability Partnerships (Application of Company Law) Regulations 2024; Limited Liability Partnerships (Application and Modification of Company Law) Regulations 2025
Relates to	Limited Liability Partnerships Act (Northern Ireland) 2002

Status: Current legislation

Text of statute as originally enacted

The Limited Liability Partnerships Act 2000 (c. 12) is an act of the Parliament of the United Kingdom.

== Provisions ==
The act introduced the concept of the limited liability partnership into English and Scots law. It created an LLP as a body with legal personality separate from its members (unlike a normal partnership) which is governed under a hybrid system of law partially from company law and partially from partnership law. Unlike normal partnerships the liability of members of an LLP on winding up is limited to the amount of capital they contributed to the LLP.

Section 2 of the act provides that an LLP may be incorporated when two or more persons associated for the purpose of carrying on legal business subscribe their names to an incorporation document; that incorporation document, or an approved copy of it, has been delivered to the Companies Registrar at Companies House; and a statement either by a solicitor or one of the subscribers that the formalities have been complied with has also been delivered to the registrar. The incorporation document must take either the prescribed form or a form as close to the prescribed form as possible. It must contain the address of the registered office of the LLP, state the name of the LLP, state the name of the members of the LLP on incorporation, state which of those members are to be "designated members" or that all members will be "designated members" and also say whether the LLP's registered office is to be situated in England and Wales, Wales or Scotland.

Section 3 provides that once the formalities have been complied with, the registrar retains the incorporation document or a copy of it and issues a certificate of incorporation. That certificate is regarded as conclusive evidence that the incorporation formalities have been complied with.

Membership of the LLP is initially those who subscribed to the incorporation document. A person may become a new member of an LLP with the agreement of existing members and cease to be a member with their agreement as well. As with a normal partnership, a partner of an LLP is not regarded as being employed by the LLP—they are self-employed. The relationship between members is governed by an agreement between the members. If an agreement does not exist the act provides that regulations may be made to specify the default form of such an agreement. As with normal partnerships the members of an LLP are agents of the LLP, and the LLP is liable for the actions of a member when that member acts in a wrongful way or makes an omission. However, unlike a normal partnership, the members of an LLP are not jointly and severally liable for the actions of another member. This is because the LLP itself has legal personality separate from its members. If the membership of an LLP changes then the registrar must be informed within 14 days and if a member changes their address the registrar must be informed within 28 days.

Members of an LLP are subject to income tax on their income as trading income in the same way as a normal partnership. They also pay class 4 National Insurance contributions in the same way as anyone else who is self-employed. Capital gains tax applies to members of LLPs as to those in a normal partnership. Within one year of incorporation of an LLP there is an exception to stamp duty on land transferred to the LLP if the person transferring the property is a member of the LLP and that the proportions of the property are the same as those before the transaction.

LLPs are wound up and subject to insolvency in much the same way as companies. Section 14 of the act makes provision for regulations to be made applying certain provisions of the Insolvency Act 1986 to LLPs. Similarly, Section 15 makes provision for the making of regulations to apply company law or disapply company law and to apply partnership law as seem appropriate.

Complementing the Limited Liability Partnerships Act 2000, much of the law on LLPs is in statutory instruments made under it that apply other legislation. Most importantly, many elements of the Companies Act 2006 are applied to LLPs by regulations made in 2008 and 2009.

If the onshore employees of a hedge fund act in a capacity exercising management functions rather than in a capacity exercising advisory functions, and fail to advise investors that they are not liable for the consequences for investment advice, then effectively they lose their protection under the 2000 act.

== Commencement ==
The act was commenced in April 2001.

== See also ==
- Limited liability partnerships in the United Kingdom
