= Betting, Gaming, Lotteries and Amusements (Northern Ireland) Order 1985 =

- Parliament of the United Kingdom
- Citation: SI 1985/1204 (NI 11)
- Territorial extent: Northern Ireland

Dates
- Made: 31 July 1985

Other legislation
- Made under: Northern Ireland Act 1974

Status: Amended

Text of the Betting, Gaming, Lotteries and Amusements (Northern Ireland) Order 1985 as in force today (including any amendments) within the United Kingdom, from legislation.gov.uk.

The Betting, Gaming, Lotteries and Amusements (Northern Ireland) Order 1985 (SI 1985/1204) (N.I. 11) is an Order in Council governing gambling in Northern Ireland.

== Provisions ==
The order places strict regulations on gambling in Northern Ireland, to the point that there are no casinos in Northern Ireland and there have been no casinos in the period of time since the legislation came into force.

Under the order there was no equivalent to the Gambling Commission in Great Britain: licences were issued through courts.

Under the order, gambling was prohibited on Sunday and Good Friday.

== Amendments ==
=== Betting, Gaming, Lotteries and Amusements (Amendment) Act (Northern Ireland) 2022 ===
Betting, Gaming, Lotteries and Amusements (Amendment) Act (Northern Ireland) 2022
- Act of the Northern Ireland Assembly
- Northern Ireland Assembly
- Long title: An Act to amend the Betting, Gaming, Lotteries and Amusements (Northern Ireland) Order 1985; and for connected purposes.
- Citation: 2022 c. 14 (N.I.)

Dates
- Royal assent: 26 April 2022

Status: Current legislation

Text of statute as originally enacted

Text of the Betting, Gaming, Lotteries and Amusements (Amendment) Act (Northern Ireland) 2022 as in force today (including any amendments) within the United Kingdom, from legislation.gov.uk.

The consultation for the bill indicated strong support for a regulator. The amendment bill was introduced to the assembly as the first part of a "two-phased approach".

The fact that Northern Ireland's gambling law was written such a long time meant there were few safeguards for online gambling. The Betting, Gaming, Lotteries and Amusements (Amendment) Act (Northern Ireland) 2022 (c. 14 (N.I.)) meant that bookmakers and bingo halls could open on Sundays and Good Friday.

The proposal for phase 2 was for "a wider reform with an aim to regulate online gambling and gaming" but this did not happen because the assembly dissolved and no further plans have been announced since the 2024 Northern Ireland Executive formation.

== See also ==
- Gambling Act 2005
