= List of statutory instruments of the United Kingdom, 1987 =

This is a complete list of all 1,468 statutory instruments published in the United Kingdom in the year 1987.

== Statutory instruments ==
=== 1-499 ===
==== 1–100 ====
- Parish and Community Meetings (Polls) Rules 1987 (SI 1987/1)
- National Health Service (Food Premises) (Scotland) Regulations 1987 (SI 1987/2)
- Public Telecommunication System Designation (Swindon Cable Limited) Order 1987 (SI 1987/3)
- Offshore Installations (Safety Zones) (Amendment) Order 1987 (SI 1987/4)
- National Health Service (General Medical and Pharmaceutical Services) Amendment Regulations 1987 (SI 1987/5)
- Health Education Authority (Establishment and Constitution) Order 1987 (SI 1987/6)
- Health Education Authority Regulations 1987 (SI 1987/7)
- Price Marking (Petrol) (Amendment) Order 1987 (SI 1987/8)
- Housing Revenue Account Rate Fund Contribution Limits (Scotland) Order 1987 (SI 1987/11)
- Act of Sederunt (Rules of Court Amendment No. 1) (Drug Trafficking) 1987 (SI 1987/12)
- A13 Trunk Road (Ripple Road, Barking and Dagenham) (Prohibition of Use of Gaps in Central Reservation) Order 1987 (SI 1987/13)
- Local Government Reorganisation (Property) (West Yorkshire) Order 1987 (SI 1987/15)
- Pelican Pedestrian Crossings Regulations and General Directions 1987 (SI 1987/16)
- Supplementary Benefit (Housing Requirements and Resources) Amendment Regulations 1987 SI 1987/17
- National Health Service (Food Premises) Regulations 1987 SI 1987/18
- Potatoes (Prohibition on Landing) (Great Britain) Order 1987 SI 1987/19
- European Assembly Elections (Day of By-election) (Midlands West Constituency) Order 1987 SI 1987/20
- Condensed Milk and Dried Milk (Scotland) Amendment Regulations 1987 SI 1987/26
- Community Drivers' Hours (Passenger and Goods Vehicles) (Temporary Exception) Regulations 1987 SI 1987/27
- Drivers' Hours (Passenger and Goods Vehicles) (Exemption) Regulations 1987 SI 1987/28
- Industrial Training Levy (Construction Board) Order 1987 SI 1987/29
- Northern Ireland (Emergency Provisions) Act 1978 (Continuance) Order 1987 SI 1987/30
- Social Security (Hospital In-Patients) Amendment Regulations 1987 SI 1987/31
- Family Income Supplements (Computation) Regulations 1987 SI 1987/32
- Statutory Sick Pay (Rate of Payment) Regulations 1987 SI 1987/33
- Education (Publication of proposals to change status of a controlled school) Regulations 1987 SI 1987/34
- Supplementary Benefit (Single Payments) Amendment Regulations 1987 SI 1987/36
- Dangerous Substances in Harbour Areas Regulations 1987 SI 1987/37
- Court of Session etc. Fees Amendment Order 1987 SI 1987/38
- Sheriff Court Fees Amendment Order 1987 SI 1987/39
- Act of Sederunt (Sessions of Court and Sederunt Days) 1987 SI 1987/40
- Social Security Benefits Up-rating Order 1987 SI 1987/45
- Social Security (Contributions, Re-rating) Order 1987 SI 1987/46
- Social Security (Treasury Supplement to and Allocation of Contributions) (Re-rating) Order 1987 SI 1987/48
- Supplementary Benefit Uprating Regulations 1987 SI 1987/49
- Registration of Births, Deaths and Marriages (Fees) Order 1987 SI 1987/50
- Weights and Measures (Local and Working Standard Capacity Measures and Testing Equipment) Regulations 1987 SI 1987/51
- Health and Safety (Explosives and Petroleum Fees) (Modification) Regulations 1987 SI 1987/52
- Offshore Installations (Safety Zones) (Revocation) Order 1987 SI 1987/53
- Offshore Installations (Safety Zones) Order 1987 SI 1987/54
- Offshore Installations (Safety Zones) (No. 2) Order 1987 SI 1987/55
- Offshore Installations (Safety Zones) (No. 3) Order 1987 SI 1987/56
- Offshore Installations (Safety Zones) (No. 4) Order 1987 SI 1987/57
- Offshore Installations (Safety Zones) (No. 5) Order 1987 SI 1987/58
- Offshore Installations (Safety Zones) (No. 6) Order 1987 SI 1987/59
- Offshore Installations (Safety Zones) (No. 7) Order 1987 SI 1987/61
- Offshore Installations (Safety Zones) (No. 8) October 1987 SI 1987/62
- Merchant Shipping (Fees) Regulations 1987 SI 1987/63
- Banking Act 1979 (Advertisements)(Amendment) Regulations 1987 SI 1987/64
- Banking Act 1979 (Exempt Transactions) (Amendment) Regulations 1987 SI 1987/65
- Offshore Installations (Safety Zones) (No. 9) Order 1987 SI 1987/66
- Offshore Installations (Safety Zones) (No. 10) Order 1987 SI 1987/67
- Offshore Installations (Safety Zones) (No. 11) Order 1987 SI 1987/68
- Offshore Installations (Safety Zones) (No. 12) Order 1987 SI 1987/69
- Offshore Installations (Safety Zones) (No. 13) Order 1987 SI 1987/70
- Offshore Installations (Safety Zones) (No. 14) Order 1987 SI 1987/71
- Offshore Installations (Safety Zones) (No. 15) Order 1987 SI 1987/72
- Gipsy Encampments (Designation of the Borough of Maidstone) Order 1987 SI 1987/73
- Diseases of Animals (Approved Disinfectants)(Amendment) Order 1987 SI 1987/74
- Derwent Valley Railway (Transfer) Light Railway Order 1987 (SI 1987/75)
- Statutory Maternity Pay (Compensation of Employers) Regulations 1987 SI 1987/91
- Statutory Sick Pay (Additional Compensation of Employers) Amendment Regulations 1987 SI 1987/92
- Betting, Gaming and Lotteries Act 1963 (Variation of Fees) (Scotland) Order 1987 SI 1987/93
- Betting, Gaming and Lotteries Act 1963 (Variation of Fees) Order 1987 SI 1987/95
- Education (Training Grants) Regulations 1987 SI 1987/96
- Community Drivers' Hours (Passenger and Goods Vehicles) (Temporary Exception) (Revocation) Regulations 1987 SI 1987/97
- Drivers' Hours (Passenger and Goods Vehicles) (Exemption) (Revocation) Regulations 1987 SI 1987/98
- North West Water Authority (Solway Firth) Trout Close Season Order 1985 SI 1987/99
- Birmingham—Great Yarmouth Trunk Road (High House and Other Diversions) (Amendment) Order 1987 SI 1987/100

=== 101–200 ===
- Town and Country Planning (Fees for Applications and Deemed Applications) (Amendment) Regulations 1987 SI 1987/101
- General Medical Council (Registration (Fees) (Amendment) Regulations) Order of Council 1987 SI 1987/102
- Peterborough New Town (Exclusion of Land) Order 1987 SI 1987/104
- A316 Trunk Road (Twickenham Road, Richmond Upon Thames) (Prescribed Routes) Order 1987 SI 1987/105
- Social Security (Contributions) Amendment Regulations 1987 SI 1987/106
- Welsh Water Authority (Llwyn Isaf Boreholes) (Discharge) Order 1987 SI 1987/107
- Tayside and Fife Regions and Perth and Kinross District and Kirkcaldy District (Westfield) Boundaries Amendment Order 1987 SI 1987/112 (S. 9)
- Welfare of Livestock (Prohibited Operations) (Amendment) Regulations 1987 SI 1987/114
- Inner Urban Areas (Designated Districts) (Wales) Order 1987 SI 1987/115
- Gas Cylinders (Pattern Approval) Regulations 1987 SI 1987/116
- London Government Reorganisation (Housing Association Mortgages) Order 1987 SI 1987/117
- Local Government Reorganisation (Capital Money) (Greater London) Order 1987 SI 1987/118
- Prevention of Terrorism (Supplemental Temporary Provisions) (Amendment) Order 1987 SI 1987/119
- The North Norfolk (Parishes) Order 1987 S.I. 1987/120
- The Mid Sussex (Parishes) Order 1987 S.I. 1987/121
- Assured Tenancies (Prescribed Amount) Order 1987 SI 1987/122
- Video Recordings Act 1984 (Commencement No. 4) Order 1987 SI 1987/123
- Preseli (Communities) Order 1987 SI 1987/124
- London Regional Transport (Levy) Order 1987 SI 1987/125
- Offshore Installations (Life-saving Appliances and Fire-fighting Equipment) (Amendment) Regulations 1987 SI 1987/129
- Pensions Increase (Review) Order 1987 SI 1987/130
- Authorised Officers (Meat Inspection) Regulations 1987 SI 1987/133
- Agricultural Levy Reliefs (Frozen Beef and Veal) Order 1987 SI 1987/134
- Brucellosis (Scotland) Amendment Order 1987 SI 1987/135
- Hovercraft (Fees) (Amendment) Regulations 1987 SI 1987/136
- Remuneration of Teachers (Primary and Secondary Education) (Amendment) Order 1987 SI 1987/137
- Foreign Compensation Commission (Union of Soviet Socialist Republics) Rules Approval Instrument 1987 SI 1987/143
- A34 Winchester—Preston Trunk Road (Peartree Hill Slip Roads) Order 1987 SI 1987/146
- Excise Duties (Small Non-Commercial Consignments) Relief (Amendment) Regulations 1987 SI 1987/149
- Value Added Tax (General) (Amendment) Regulations 1987 SI 1987/150
- Welsh Health Promotion Authority (Establishment and Constitution) Order 1987 SI 1987/151
- Welsh Health Promotion Authority Regulations 1987 SI 1987/152
- Food Protection (Emergency Prohibitions) (England) (No. 2) Amendment Order 1987 SI 1987/153
- Value Added Tax (Small Non-Commercial Consignments) Relief (Amendment) Order 1987 SI 1987/154
- Value Added Tax (Imported Goods) Relief (Amendment) Order 1987 SI 1987/155
- Police (Injury Benefit) Regulations 1987 SI 1987/156
- Police Cadets (Pensions) (Amendment) Regulations 1987 SI 1987/157
- Police Cadets (Injury Benefit) Regulations 1987 SI 1987/158
- Special Constables (Injury Benefit) Regulations 1987 SI 1987/159
- Video Recordings Act 1984 (Scotland) (Commencement No. 4) Order 1987 SI 1987/160
- Local Authorities (Armorial Bearings) Order 1987 SI 1987/162
- Child Abduction and Custody (Parties to Conventions) (Amendment) Order 1987 SI 1987/163
- Foreign Compensation (Financial Provisions) Order 1987 SI 1987/164
- Naval, Military and Air Forces etc. (Disablement and Death) Service Pensions Amendment Order 1987 SI 1987/165
- Agriculture and Fisheries (Financial Assistance) (Northern Ireland) Order 1986 SI 1987/166
- Education (Northern Ireland) Order 1987 SI 1987/167
- Local Elections (Northern Ireland) (Amendment) Order 1987 SI 1987/168
- Double Taxation Relief (Taxes on Income) (Ivory Coast) Order 1987 SI 1987/169
- Trade Marks and Service Marks (Relevant Countries) (Amendment) Order 1987 SI 1987/170
- Jersey (Navigator Hyperbolic System) Order 1987 SI 1987/171
- Building Societies (Provision of Services) Order 1987 SI 1987/172
- District of Carmarthen (Electoral Arrangements) Order 1987 SI 1987/176
- Immigration (Ports of Entry) Order 1987 SI 1987/177
- Housing and Planning Act 1986 (Commencement No. 2) Order 1987 SI 1987/178
- Trafford Park Development Corporation (Area and Constitution) Order 1986 SI 1987/179
- Control of Industrial Air Pollution (Transfer of Powers of Enforcement) Regulations 1987 SI 1987/180
- Local Government (Direct Labour Organisations) (Competition) (Amendment) Regulations 1987 SI 1987/181
- Food Protection (Emergency Prohibitions) (Wales) (No. 2) Amendment Order 1987 SI 1987/182
- Petty Sessional Divisions (Northamptonshire) Order 1987 SI 1987/184
- Seeds (National Lists of Varieties) (Fees) Regulations 1987 SI 1987/188
- Plant Breeders' Rights (Fees) Regulations 1987 SI 1987/189
- Personal Injuries (Civilians) Amendment Scheme 1987 SI 1987/191
- Special Hospital Boards (Amendment of Constitution) Order 1987 SI 1987/192
- The Ellesmere Port and Neston (Parishes) Order 1987 S.I. 1987/195
- The Horsham (Parishes) Order 1987 S.I. 1987/196
- The Rushcliffe (Parishes) Order 1987 S.I. 1987/197
- Public Order Act 1986 (Commencement No. 2) Order 1987 SI 1987/198
- Offshore Installations (Safety Zones) (Revocation) (No. 2) Order 1987 SI 1987/199
- Offshore Installations (Safety Zones) (No. 16) Order 1987 SI 1987/200

=== 201–300 ===
- Offshore Installations (Safety Zones) (No. 17) Order 1987 SI 1987/201
- Offshore Installations (Safety Zones) (No. 18) Order 1987 SI 1987/202
- Offshore Installations (Safety Zones) (No. 19) Order 1987 SI 1987/203
- Offshore Installations (Safety Zones) (No. 20) Order 1987 SI 1987/204
- Offshore Installations (Safety Zones) (No. 21) Order 1987 SI 1987/205
- Offshore Installations (Safety Zones) (No. 22) Order 1987 SI 1987/206
- Representation of the People Act 1985 (Commencement No. 4) Order 1987 SI 1987/207
- Education (Grants for Training of Teachers and Community Education Workers) (Scotland) Amendment Regulations 1987 SI 1987/208
- Superannuation (Children's Pensions) (Earnings Limit) Order 1987 SI 1987/209
- Export of Sheep (Prohibition) Order 1987 SI 1987/211
- Milk and Dairies and Milk (Special Designation) (Charges) Regulations 1987 SI 1987/212
- Sole (North Sea) (Enforcement of Community Conservation Measures) Order 1987 SI 1987/213
- Social Security Commissioners Procedure Regulations 1987 SI 1987/214
- Export of Goods (Control) (Amendment No. 8) Order 1987 SI 1987/215
- Weights and Measures (Carriage of Solid Fuel by Rail) Order 1987 SI 1987/216
- Several and Regulated Fisheries (Form of Application) Regulations 1987 SI 1987/217
- Shellfish (Specification of Molluscs) Regulations 1987 SI 1987/218
- Merchant Shipping (Indemnification of Shipowners) Order 1987 SI 1987/220
- Nottinghamshire (District Boundaries) Order 1987 SI 1987/221
- Harbour Authorities (Teignmouth) (Constitution) Order 1987 SI 1987/222
- Diseases of Animals (Waste Food) (Amendment) Order 1987 SI 1987/232
- Movement and Sale of Pigs (Amendment) Order 1987 SI 1987/233
- Tendring Hundred Water Order 1987 SI 1987/234
- Statutory Maternity Pay (Medical Evidence) Regulations 1987 SI 1987/235
- Remuneration of Teachers (Primary and Secondary Education) (Amendment) (No. 2) Order 1987 SI 1987/236
- Gaming Act (Variation of Fees) Order 1987 SI 1987/242
- Lotteries (Gaming Board Fees) Order 1987 SI 1987/243
- Merchant Shipping (Light Dues) (Amendment) Regulations 1987 SI 1987/244
- National Health Service Functions (Amendment of Directions to Authorities) Regulations 1987 SI 1987/245
- Export of Sheep (Prohibition) (Amendment) Order 1987 SI 1987/248
- Food Protection (Emergency Prohibitions) (England) (No. 2) Amendment No. 2 Order 1987 SI 1987/249
- Social Security (Notification of Deaths) Regulations 1987 SI 1987/250
- County Council of West Midlands (Black Country Route) (Bridge over Birmingham Canal (Wolverhampton Level)) Scheme 1985 Confirmation Instrument 1987 SI 1987/251
- County Council of West Midlands (M6 Motorway Junction 10) (Connecting Road) Scheme 1985 Confirmation Instrument 1987 SI 1987/252
- Gaming Act (Variation of Fees) (Scotland)Order 1987 SI 1987/255
- Police Pensions (Supplementary Provisions) Regulations 1987 SI 1987/256
- Police Pensions Regulations 1987 SI 1987/257
- Certification Officer (Amendment of Fees) Regulations 1987 SI 1987/258
- Capital Gains Tax (Gilt-edged Securities) Order 1987 SI 1987/259
- Local Elections (Parishes and Communities) (Amendment) Rules 1987 SI 1987/260
- Local Elections (Principal Areas) (Amendment) Rules 1987 SI 1987/261
- Parish and Community Meetings (Polls) (Amendment) Rules 1987 SI 1987/262
- Food Protection (Emergency Prohibitions) (Wales) (No. 2) Amendment No. 2 Order 1987 SI 1987/263
- Rent (Relief from Phasing) Order 1987 SI 1987/264
- Protected Shorthold Tenancies (Rent Registration) Order 1987 SI 1987/265
- Rent Act 1977 (Forms etc.) (Amendment) Regulations 1987 SI 1987/266
- Protected Shorthold Tenancies (Notice to Tenant) Regulations 1987 SI 1987/267
- Home Purchase Assistance (Price-limits) Order 1987 SI 1987/268
- Civil Aviation (Navigation Services Charges) (Second Amendment) Regulations 1987 SI 1987/269
- Food Protection (Emergency Prohibitions) (No.10) Revocation Order 1987 SI 1987/270
- Export of Goods (Control) (Amendment No. 9) Order 1987 SI 1987/271
- Data Protection (Fees) Regulations 1987 SI 1987/272
- Prevention of Terrorism (Temporary Provisions) Act 1984 (Continuance) Order 1987 SI 1987/273
- Rate Support Grant (Scotland) Order 1987 SI 1987/275
- Family Income Supplements (General) Amendment Regulations 1987 SI 1987/281
- Potato Marketing Scheme (Amendment) Order 1987 SI 1987/282
- Swansea—Manchester Trunk Road (Newbridge, Ruabon and Johnstown By-pass and Slip Roads) Order 1982 (Variation) Order 1987 SI 1987/285
- Nightwear (Safety) (Amendment) Regulations 1987 SI 1987/286
- Designs (Amendment) Rules 1987 SI 1987/287
- Patents (Amendment) Rules 1987 SI 1987/288
- Legal Aid (Scotland) Act 1986 (Commencement No. 2) Order 1987 SI 1987/289
- Schools General (Scotland) Amendment Regulations 1987 SI 1987/290
- Education (Grants for Further Training of Teachers and Educational Psychologists) (Scotland) Regulations 1987 SI 1987/291
- Third Country Fishing (Enforcement) Order 1987 SI 1987/292
- Local Government Superannuation (Miscellaneous Provisions) Regulations 1987 SI 1987/293
- Pilotage Commission Provision of Funds Scheme 1987 (Confirmation) Order 1987 SI 1987/295
- Misuse of Drugs (Licence Fees) (Amendment) Regulations 1987 SI 1987/298
- Prosecution of Offences (Custody Time Limits) Regulations 1987 SI 1987/299
- Borough of Dinefwr (Electoral Arrangements) Order 1987 SI 1987/300

=== 301–400 ===
- District of Preseli (Electoral Arrangements) Order 1987 SI 1987/301
- Housing and Planning Act 1986 (Commencement No.3) Order 1987 SI 1987/304
- Kent (District Boundaries) Order 1987 SI 1987/305
- Merchant Shipping (Submersible Craft) (Amendment) Regulations 1987 SI 1987/306
- Criminal Legal Aid (Scotland) Regulations 1987 SI 1987/307
- Colleges of Education (Allowances to Governors:Prescribed Bodies) (Scotland) Regulations 1987 SI 1987/308
- Colleges of Education (Scotland) Regulations 1987 SI 1987/309
- Sugar Beet (Research and Education) Order 1987 SI 1987/310
- Merchant Shipping (Submersible Craft Operations) Regulations 1987 SI 1987/311
- General Betting Duty (Amendment) Regulations 1987 SI 1987/312
- General Betting Duty (Northern Ireland) (Amendment) Regulations 1987 SI 1987/313
- Spoilt Beer (Remission and Repayment of Duty) Regulations 1987 SI 1987/314
- Motor Vehicles (Type Approval and Approval Marks) (Fees) (Amendment) Regulations 1987 SI 1987/315
- Social Security (Earnings Factor) Amendment Regulations 1987 SI 1987/316
- Social Security (Unemployment, Sickness and Invalidity Benefit) Amendment Regulations 1987 SI 1987/317
- General Drainage Charge (Anglian Water Authority) (Ascertainment) Order 1987 SI 1987/318
- London—Fishguard Trunk Road (A48) (County of West Glamorgan) and The Swansea—Manchester Trunk Road (A483) (Penllergaer Roundabout, M4 to A483/A4070 Ivorites Junction) Detrunking Order 1987 SI 1987/319
- London—Fishguard Trunk Road (A48) (County of South Glamorgan) and The Cardiff—Glan Conwy Trunk Road (A470) (County of South Glamorgan) Detrunking Order 1987 SI 1987/320
- London—Fishguard Trunk Road (A48) (County of Mid Glamorgan) Detrunking Order 1987 SI 1987/321
- London—Fishguard Trunk Road (A48) and The Newhouse—High Beech Principal Road (A466) (County of Gwent) Order 1987 SI 1987/322
- (A17) King's Lynn-Sleaford-Newark Trunk Road (Long Sutton-Sutton Bridge Bypass) Order 1987 SI 1987/326
- Social Security Benefits Up-rating Regulations 1987 SI 1987/327
- (A17) King's Lynn-Sleaford-Newark Trunk Road (Long Sutton-Sutton Bridge Bypass Detrunking) Order 1987 SI 1987/328
- National Savings Bank (Investment Deposits) (Limits) (Amendment) Order 1987 SI 1987/329
- Savings Banks (Ordinary Deposits) (Limits) (Amendment) Order 1987 SI 1987/330
- Housing Support Grant (Scotland) Variation Order 1987 SI 1987/331
- Housing Support Grant (Scotland) Order 1987 SI 1987/332
- Scottish Solicitors' Discipline Tribunal (Increase of Maximum Fine) Order 1987 SI 1987/333
- Hamilton and East Kilbride Districts (Spectacle E'e Falls, Sandford) Boundaries Amendment Order 1987 SI 1987/334 (S. 24)
- Social Security (Industrial Injuries) (Prescribed Diseases) Amendment Regulations 1987 SI 1987/335
- Transport Act 1985 (Modifications in Schedule 4 to the Transport Act 1968) (Amendment) Order 1987 SI 1987/337
- Hereford and Worcester (District Boundaries) Order 1987 for the purposes described SI 1987/338
- Buckinghamshire (District Boundaries) Order 1987 SI 1987/339
- Import and Export (Plant Health Fees) (England and Wales) Order 1987 SI 1987/340
- Police (Injury Benefit) (Amendment) Regulations 1987 SI 1987/341
- Police Cadets (Injury Benefit) (Amendment) Regulations 1987 SI 1987/342
- Special Constables (Injury Benefit) (Amendment) Regulations 1987 SI 1987/343
- Education (No. 2) Act 1986 (Commencement No. 2) Order 1987 SI 1987/344
- Revaluation Rate Rebates (Scotland) Order 1986 SI 1987/345
- Motor Vehicles (Competitions and Trials) (Scotland) Amendment Regulations 1987 SI 1987/346
- Block Grant (Education Adjustments) (England) Regulations 1987 SI 1987/347
- Housing and Planning Act 1986 (Commencement No. 4) Order 1987 SI 1987/348
- Town and Country Planning (Listed Buildings and Buildings in Conservation Areas) Regulations 1987 SI 1987/349
- Insurance (Fees) Regulations 1987 SI 1987/350
- Local Government (Prescribed Expenditure) (Amendment) Regulations 1987 SI 1987/351
- Pension Scheme Surpluses (Administration) Regulations 1987 SI 1987/352
- Road Traffic Accidents (Payments for Treatment) Order 1987 SI 1987/353
- Social Security Act 1986 (Commencement No. 5) Order 1987 SI 1987/354
- Social Security Benefit (Dependency) Amendment Regulations 1987 SI 1987/355
- Combined Probation Areas (Northamptonshire) Order 1987 SI 1987/356
- Child Benefit (General) Amendment Regulations 1987 SI 1987/357
- Supplementary Benefit (Conditions of Entitlement) Amendment Regulations 1987 SI 1987/358
- Block Grant (Education Adjustments) (Wales) Regulations 1987 SI 1987/359
- Land Registration (District Registries) Order 1987 SI 1987/360
- Diseases of Animals (Waste Food) (Fees for Licences) Order 1987 SI 1987/361
- Capital Allowances (Corresponding Northern Ireland Grants) Order 1987 SI 1987/362
- Crown Roads (Royal Parks) (Application of Road Traffic Enactments) Order 1987 SI 1987/363
- National Assistance (Charges for Accommodation) (Scotland) Regulations 1987 SI 1987/364
- Criminal Legal Aid (Scotland) (Fees) Regulations 1987 SI 1987/365
- Civil Legal Aid (Scotland) (Fees) Regulations 1987 SI 1987/366
- National Health Service (Charges for Drugs and Appliances) (Scotland) Amendment Regulations 1987 SI 1987/367
- National Health Service (Charges for Drugs and Appliances) Amendment Regulations 1987 SI 1987/368
- Legal Aid in Criminal Proceedings (Costs) (Amendment) Regulations 1987 SI 1987/369
- National Assistance (Charges for Accommodation) Regulations 1987 SI 1987/370
- National Health Service (Charges to Overseas Visitors) Amendment Regulations 1987 SI 1987/371
- Statutory Sick Pay (General) Amendment Regulations 1987 SI 1987/372
- Judicial Pensions (Requisite Benefits) Order 1987 SI 1987/373
- Judicial Pensions (Preservation of Benefits) Order 1987 SI 1987/374
- Judicial Pensions (Widows' and Children's Benefits) Regulations 1987 SI 1987/375
- Superannuation (Judicial Offices) (Aggregation of Service) Rules 1987 SI 1987/376
- Industrial Assurance (Fees) Regulations 1987 SI 1987/377
- Building Societies (Non-Retail Funds and Deposits) Order 1987 SI 1987/378
- Civil Aviation Authority (Amendment) Regulations 1987 SI 1987/379
- Airports Byelaws (Designation) Order 1987 SI 1987/380
- Civil Legal Aid (Scotland) Regulations 1987 SI 1987/381
- Advice and Assistance (Scotland) Regulations 1987 SI 1987/382
- Smoke Control Areas (Exempted Fireplaces) (Scotland) Order 1987 SI 1987/383
- Legal Aid (Scotland) (Children) Regulations 1987 SI 1987/384
- National Health Service (General Medical and Pharmaceutical Services) (Scotland) Amendment Regulations 1987 SI 1987/385
- National Health Service (General Medical and Pharmaceutical Services) (Scotland) Amendment (No. 2) Regulations 1987 SI 1987/386
- National Health Service (Charges to Overseas Visitors) (Scotland) Amendment Regulations 1987 SI 1987/387
- Legal Advice and Assistance at Police Stations (Remuneration) (Amendment) Regulations 1987 SI 1987/388
- Local Land Charges (Amendment) Rules 1987 SI 1987/389
- Artificial Insemination (Cattle and Pigs) (Fees) Regulations 1987 SI 1987/390
- Building Societies (General Charge and Fees) Regulations 1987 SI 1987/391
- Friendly Societies (Fees) Regulations 1987 SI 1987/392
- Industrial and Provident Societies (Credit Unions) (Amendment of Fees) Regulations 1987 SI 1987/393
- Building Societies Act 1986 (Accounts and Related Transitional Provisions) Order 1987 SI 1987/395
- Legal Advice and Assistance (Financial Conditions) (No. 2) Regulations 1987 SI 1987/396
- Acquisition of Land (Rate of Interest after Entry) (Scotland) Regulations 1987 SI 1987/397
- Remuneration of Teachers (Primary and Secondary Education) (Amendment) (No. 3) Order 1987 SI 1987/398
- National Health Service (Amendment) Act 1986 (Commencement No. 1) Order 1987 SI 1987/399
- Pneumoconiosis, Byssinosis and Miscellaneous Diseases Benefit (Amendment) Scheme 1987 SI 1987/400

=== 401–500 ===
- National Health Service (General Medical and Pharmaceutical Services) Amendment (No. 2) Regulations 1987 SI 1987/401
- Control of Pollution (Landed Ships' Waste) Regulations 1987 SI 1987/402
- Public Trustee (Fees) (Amendment) Order 1987 SI 1987/403
- Income Tax (Interest Relief) (Housing Associations) (No. 3) Regulations 1987 SI 1987/404
- Acquisition of Land (Rate of Interest after Entry) Regulations 1987 SI 1987/405
- Maternity Pay and Maternity Allowance (Transitional) Regulations 1987 SI 1987/406
- National Health Service (General Medical and Pharmaceutical Services) Amendment (No. 3) Regulations 1987 SI 1987/407
- Merchant Shipping (Seamen's Documents) Regulations 1987 SI 1987/408
- Social Security (Medical Evidence) Amendment Regulations 1987 SI 1987/409
- Milk (Community Outgoers Scheme) (England and Wales) (Amendment) Regulations 1987 SI 1987/410
- Social Security (Earnings Factor) Amendment (No. 2) Regulations 1987 SI 1987/411
- Pension Scheme Surpluses (Valuation) Regulations 1987 SI 1987/412
- Social Security (Contributions) Amendment (No. 2) Regulations 1987 SI 1987/413
- Social Security (Credits) Amendment Regulations 1987 SI 1987/414
- Social Security (Industrial Injuries) (Reduced Earnings Allowance and Transitional) Regulations 1987 SI 1987/415
- Social Security (Maternity Allowance) Regulations 1987 SI 1987/416
- Social Security (Maternity Allowance) (Work Abroad) Regulations 1987 SI 1987/417
- Statutory Maternity Pay (Persons Abroad and Mariners) Regulations 1987 SI 1987/418
- Workmen's Compensation (Supplementation) Amendment Scheme 1987 SI 1987/419
- Padstow Harbour Revision Order 1987 SI 1987/420
- Legal Aid in Criminal Proceedings (General) (Amendment) Regulations 1987 SI 1987/422
- Police (Scotland) Amendment Regulations 1987 SI 1987/423
- Police Cadets (Scotland) Amendment Regulations 1987 SI 1987/424
- Milk (Community Outgoers' Scheme) (Scotland) Amendment Regulations 1987 SI 1987/425
- Building Societies Act 1986 (Meetings) (Transitional Provisions) Order 1987 SI 1987/426
- Act of Sederunt (Legal Aid Rules) (Children) 1987 SI 1987/427
- Import and Export (Plant Health) (Great Britain) (Amendment) Order 1987 SI 1987/428
- Workmen's Compensation (Supplementation) Amendment (No. 2) Scheme 1987 SI 1987/429
- Act of Adjournal (Criminal Legal Aid Rules) 1987 SI 1987/430
- Civil Legal Aid (Scotland) Amendment Regulations 1987 SI 1987/431
- Valuation Timetable (Scotland) Amendment Order 1987 SI 1987/432
- Town and Country Planning (Compensation for Restrictions on Mineral Workings) (Scotland) Regulations 1987 SI 1987/433
- Income Tax (Indexation) Order 1987 SI 1987/434
- Inheritance Tax (Indexation) Order 1987 SI 1987/435
- Capital Gains Tax (Annual Exempt Amount) Order 1987 SI 1987/436
- Value Added Tax (Charities) Order 1987 SI 1987/437
- Value Added Tax (Increase of Registration Limits) Order 1987 SI 1987/438
- Police and Criminal Evidence Act 1984 (Application to Customs and Excise) Order 1987 SI 1987/439
- Transfer of Undertakings (Protection of Employment) (Amendment) Regulations 1987 SI 1987/442
- Legal Advice and Representation (Duty Solicitor) (Remuneration) Regulations 1987 SI 1987/443
- Public Record Office (Fees) Regulations 1987 SI 1987/444
- National Health Service (Service Committees and Tribunal) Amendment Regulations 1987 SI 1987/445
- Nurses, Midwives and Health Visitors (Entry to Training Requirements) Amendment Rules Approval Order 1987 SI 1987/446
- Veterinary Surgeons Qualifications (EEC Recognition) (Spanish and Portuguese Qualifications) Order 1987 SI 1987/447
- European Communities (Designation) Order 1987 SI 1987/448
- House of Commons Disqualification Order 1987 SI 1987/449
- Anguilla (Public Seal) Order 1987 SI 1987/450
- Aviation Security (Anguilla) Order 1987 SI 1987/451
- Fugitive Offenders (Anguilla) Order 1987 SI 1987/452
- Genocide (Anguilla) Order 1987 SI 1987/453
- Internationally Protected Persons (Anguilla) Order 1987 SI 1987/454
- Taking of Hostages (Anguilla) Order 1987 SI 1987/455
- Tokyo Convention (Anguilla) Order 1987 SI 1987/456
- General Medical Council (Constitution) Amendment Order 1987 SI 1987/457
- Agriculture (Environmental Areas) (Northern Ireland) Order 1987 SI 1987/458
- Appropriation (Northern Ireland) Order 1987 SI 1987/459
- Audit (Northern Ireland) Order 1987 SI 1987/460
- Education (Corporal Punishment) (Northern Ireland) Order 1987 SI 1987/461
- Parliamentary Constituencies (England) (Miscellaneous Changes) Order 1987 SI 1987/462
- Public Order (Northern Ireland) Order 1987 SI 1987/463
- Social Fund (Maternity and Funeral Expenses) (Northern Ireland) Order 1987 SI 1987/464
- Transfer of Functions (Immigration Appeals) Order 1987 SI 1987/465
- Double Taxation Relief (Taxes on Income) (France) Order 1987 SI 1987/466
- Double Taxation Relief (Taxes on Income) (Mauritius) Order 1987 SI 1987/467
- Reciprocal Enforcement of Foreign Judgments (Canada) Order 1987 SI 1987/468
- Parliamentary Constituencies (Scotland) (Miscellaneous Changes) Order 1987 SI 1987/469
- Merchant Shipping (Prevention and Control of Pollution) Order 1987 SI 1987/470
- London—Brighton Trunk Road (A23 Hickstead) Order 1987 SI 1987/472
- London—Brighton Trunk Road (A23 Hickstead Slip Roads) Order 1987 SI 1987/473
- London—Brighton Trunk Road (A23 Warninglid Flyover—South of Bolney) Order 1987 SI 1987/474
- The Adur (Parishes) Order 1987 S.I. 1987/475
- The Barrow-in-Furness (Parishes) Order 1987 S.I. 1987/476
- The Sevenoaks (Parishes) Order 1987 S.I. 1987/477
- The Chelmsford (Parishes) Order 1987 S.I. 1987/478
- The South Ribble (Parishes) Order 1987 S.I. 1987/479
- Social Fund Maternity and Funeral Expenses (General) Regulations 1987 SI 1987/481
- Borough of Chelmsford (Electoral Arrangements) Order 1987 SI 1987/483
- Borough of South Ribble (Electoral Arrangements) Order 1987 SI 1987/484
- District of Kingswood (Electoral Arrangements) Order 1987 SI 1987/485
- District of Montgomeryshire (Electoral Arrangements) Order 1987 SI 1987/486
- A40 London—Fishguard Trunk Road (Swakeleys Road Junction Improvement Trunk Road and Slip Roads) Order 1987 SI 1987/490
- Social Security (Payments on account, Overpayments and Recovery) Regulations 1987 SI 1987/491
- Act of Sederunt (Civil Legal Aid Rules) 1987 SI 1987/492
- County Court (Amendment) Rules 1987 SI 1987/493
- The Solihull (Parishes) Order 1987 S.I. 1987/494
- The Leominster (Parishes) Order 1987 S.I. 1987/495
- The South Shropshire (Parishes) Order 1987 S.I. 1987/496
- The Canterbury (Parishes) Order 1987 S.I. 1987/497
- Seed Potatoes (Fees) (Scotland) Regulations 1987 SI 1987/498
- Education (Bursaries for Teacher Training) (Amendment) Regulations 1987 SI 1987/499

=== 501–600 ===
- Value Added Tax (General) (Amendment) (No. 2) Regulations 1987 SI 1987/510
- PARLIAMENT SI 1987/511
- Income Tax (Official Rate of Interest on Beneficial Loans) Order 1987 SI 1987/512
- Income Tax (Interest on Unpaid Tax and Repayment Supplement) Order 1987 SI 1987/513
- Stamp Duty Reserve Tax (Interest on Tax Repaid) Order 1987 SI 1987/514
- Stamp Duty (Exempt Instruments) Regulations 1987 SI 1987/516
- Value Added Tax (Betting, Gaming and Lotteries) Order 1987 SI 1987/517
- Value Added Tax (International Services) Order 1987 SI 1987/518
- Petty Sessional Divisions (Northamptonshire) (Amendment) Order 1987 SI 1987/519
- Industry Act 1980 (Increase of Limit) Order 1987 SI 1987/520
- North East of Birmingham – Nottingham Trunk Road The Birmingham – Nottingham Route (Ashby-de-la-Zouch Slip Roads) Order 1987 SI 1987/521
- North East of Birmingham—Nottingham Trunk Road The Birmingham—Nottingham Route (Appleby Magna to Kegworth Section and Slip Roads) (Variation) Order 1987 SI 1987/522
- (A453) North East of Birmingham—Nottingham Trunk Road (Appleby Magna to Ashby-de-la-Zouch) Detrunking Order 1987 SI 1987/523
- Motor Vehicles (Type Approval) (Amendment) Regulations 1987 SI 1987/524
- Injuries in War (Shore Employments) Compensation (Amendment) Scheme 1987 SI 1987/529
- Income Tax (Entertainers and Sportsmen) Regulations 1987 SI 1987/530
- (A452) London-Holyhead Trunk Road (De-Trunking from Streetly to Erdington) Order 1987 SI 1987/531
- Social Security Act 1986 (Commencement No. 6) Order 1987 SI 1987/543
- Cheshire County Council (Forrest Way Bridge, Warrington) Scheme 1986 Confirmation Instrument 1987 SI 1987/544
- Foreign Fields (Specification) (No. 1) Order 1987 SI 1987/545
- (A16) Norman Cross—Grimsby Trunk Road (Diversion between London Road, Boston and Algarkirk) (Variation) Order 1987 SI 1987/546
- Seed Potatoes (Amendment) Regulations 1987 SI 1987/547
- Merchant Shipping (Fees) (Amendment) Regulations 1987 SI 1987/548
- Merchant Shipping (IBC Code) Regulations 1987 SI 1987/549
- Merchant Shipping (BCH Code) Regulations 1987 SI 1987/550
- Merchant Shipping (Control of Pollution by Noxious Liquid Substances in Bulk) Regulations 1987 SI 1987/551
- Southern Water Authority (Romney Marsh Levels Internal Drainage District) Order 1987 SI 1987/555
- Gipsy Encampments (City of Lancaster) Order 1987 SI 1987/556
- Motor Vehicles (Driving Licences) (Amendment) Regulations 1987 SI 1987/560
- Local Elections (Communities) (Welsh Forms) Order 1987 SI 1987/561
- Local Elections (Principal Areas) (Welsh Forms) Order 1987 SI 1987/562
- Disabled Persons (Services, Consultation and Representation) Act 1986 (Commencement No. 1) Order 1987 SI 1987/564
- War Pensions (Mercantile Marine) (Amendment) Scheme 1987 SI 1987/585
- Merchant Shipping (Reporting of Pollution Incidents) Regulations 1987 SI 1987/586
- British Council and Commonwealth Institute Superannuation Act 1986 (Commencement No. 2) Order 1987 SI 1987/588
- Offshore Installations (Safety Zones) (No. 23) Order 1987 SI 1987/591
- Offshore Installations (Safety Zones) (No. 24) Order 1987 SI 1987/592
- Offshore Installations (Safety Zones) (No. 25) Order 1987 SI 1987/593
- Offshore Installations (Safety Zones) (No. 26) Order 1987 SI 1987/594
- Offshore Installations (Safety Zones) (Revocation) (No. 3) Order 1987 SI 1987/595

=== 601–700 ===
- Plugs and Sockets etc. (Safety) Regulations 1987 SI 1987/603
- New Valuation Lists (Time and Class of Hereditaments) Order 1987 SI 1987/604
- Health and Safety (Fees) Regulations 1987 SI 1987/605
- Social Security Benefit (Computation of Earnings) Amendment Regulations 1987 SI 1987/606
- Industrial Training Levy (Engineering Board) Order 1987 SI 1987/607
- Gaming Act (Variation of Monetary Limits) Order 1987 SI 1987/608
- Gaming Clubs (Hours and Charges) (Amendment) Regulations 1987 SI 1987/609
- Patents (Fees) Rules 1987 SI 1987/610
- British Citizenship (Designated Service) (Amendment) Order 1987 SI 1987/611
- Northumbrian Water Authority (T Nets) (Northern Area) Order 1987 SI 1987/612
- Mid Southern Water Order 1987 SI 1987/613
- A406 Trunk Road (Hanger Lane, Ealing) (Prohibition of Left Turn) Order 1987 SI 1987/617
- The Kennet (Parishes) Order 1987 S.I. 1987/619
- The Chichester (Parishes) Order 1987 S.I. 1987/620
- The Wycombe (Parishes) Order 1987 S.I. 1987/621
- Civil Defence (Grant) (Amendment) Regulations 1987 SI 1987/622
- Financial Services Act 1986 (Commencement) (No. 4) Order 1987 SI 1987/623
- The Ashford (Parishes) Order 1987 S.I. 1987/624
- Smoke Control Areas (Authorised Fuels) Regulations 1987 SI 1987/625
- Milk Quota (Calculation of Standard Quota) (Amendment) Order 1987 SI 1987/626
- Legal Advice and Assistance (Financial Conditions) Regulations 1987 SI 1987/627
- Legal Aid (Financial Conditions) Regulations 1987 SI 1987/628
- Gaming Act (Variation of Monetary Limits) (Scotland) Order 1987 SI 1987/630
- Gaming Clubs (Hours and Charges) (Scotland) Amendment Regulations 1987 SI 1987/631
- Forestry (Felling of Trees) (Amendment) Regulations 1987 SI 1987/632
- The Waveney (Parishes) Order 1987 S.I. 1987/633
- Merchant Shipping Act 1979 (Commencement No. 11) Order 1987 SI 1987/635
- Advice and Assistance (Assistance by Way of Representation) (Scotland) Regulations 1987 SI 1987/642
- Scottish Land Court (Fees) Amendment Rules 1987 SI 1987/643
- Education (Grants for Further Training of Teachers and Educational Psychologists) (Scotland) (No.2) Regulations 1987 SI 1987/644
- Cardiff Bay Development Corporation (Area and Constitution) Order 1987 SI 1987/646
- The East Lindsey (Parishes) Order 1987 S.I. 1987/647
- The South Bucks (Parishes) Order 1987 S.I. 1987/648
- Seed Potatoes (Fees) Regulations 1987 SI 1987/649
- Education (School Teachers' Pay and Conditions of Employment) Order 1987 SI 1987/650
- Local Government Reorganisation (Property) (South Yorkshire) Order 1987 SI 1987/651
- Environmentally Sensitive Areas (Breadalbane) Designation Order 1987 SI 1987/653
- Environmentally Sensitive Areas (Loch Lomond) Designation Order 1987 SI 1987/654
- Social Security (Class 1 Contributions—Contracted-out Percentages) Order 1987 SI 1987/656
- State Scheme Premiums (Actuarial Tables) Regulations 1987 SI 1987/657
- State Scheme Premiums (Actuarial Tables – Transitional Provisions) Regulations 1987 SI 1987/658
- Supplementary Benefit (Requirements and Resources) Amendment and Uprating Regulations 1987 SI 1987/659
- Supplementary Benefit (Resources) Amendment Regulations 1987 SI 1987/660
- Parliamentary Commissioner Order 1987 SI 1987/661
- Bermuda (Evidence) Order 1987 SI 1987/662
- Foreign Compensation (Union of Soviet Socialist Republics) (Distribution) Order 1987 SI 1987/663
- Merchant Shipping (Prevention and Control of Pollution) (Hong Kong) Order 1987 SI 1987/664
- Food and Environment Protection Act 1985 (Guernsey) Order 1987 SI 1987/665
- Food and Environment Protection Act 1985 (Isle of Man) Order 1987 SI 1987/666
- Food and Environment Protection Act 1985 (Jersey) Order 1987 SI 1987/667
- Nuclear Installations (Isle of Man) (Variation) Order 1987 SI 1987/668
- Statistics of Trade Act 1947 (Amendment of Schedule) Order 1987 SI 1987/669
- Carriage of Passengers and their Luggage by Sea (Domestic Carriage) Order 1987 SI 1987/670
- Home-Grown Cereals Authority Levy Scheme (Approval) Order 1987 SI 1987/671
- Cable and Broadcasting Act 1984 (Commencement No.3) Order 1987 SI 1987/672
- Broadcasting (Extension of Duration of IBA's Function) Order 1987 SI 1987/673
- Medicines (Products Other Than Veterinary Drugs) (Prescription Only) Amendment Order 1987 SI 1987/674
- Motor Cycles (Eye Protectors) (Amendment) Regulations 1987 SI 1987/675
- Road Vehicles (Construction and Use) (Amendment) Regulations 1987 SI 1987/676
- Civil Defence (Grant) (Scotland) Amendment Regulations 1987 SI 1987/677
- Social Security (Credits) Amendment (No. 2) Regulations 1987 SI 1987/687
- Social Security (Unemployment, Sickness and Invalidity Benefit) Amendment (No. 2) Regulations 1987 SI 1987/688
- National Library of Wales (Delivery of Books) (Amendment) Order 1987 SI 1987/698
- (A19) East of Snaith-York-Thirsk-Stockton-on-Tees-Sunderland Trunk Road (Burnhope Way Roundabout Grade Separated Junction) Order 1987 SI 1987/699
- Opencast Coal (Rate of Interest on Compensation) Order 1987 SI 1987/700

=== 701–800 ===
- Town and Country Planning (Appeals) (Written Representations Procedure) Regulations 1987 SI 1987/701
- Town and Country Planning General Development (Amendment) Order 1987 SI 1987/702
- Carriage of Passengers and their Luggage by Sea (Notice) Order 1987 SI 1987/703
- Advice and Assistance (Financial Conditions) (Scotland) Regulations 1987 SI 1987/704
- Civil Legal Aid (Financial Conditions) (Scotland) Regulations 1987 SI 1987/705
- A49 Shrewsbury–Whitchurch–Warrington Trunk Road (Prees By-Pass) Order 1987 SI 1987/707
- Designation of Local Authority (Portsmouth Port Health District) Order 1987 SI 1987/709
- Agricultural Holdings (Arbitration on Notices) Order 1987 SI 1987/710
- Agricultural Holdings (Forms of Notice to Pay Rent or to Remedy) Regulations 1987 SI 1987/711
- Offshore Installations (Safety Zones) (No. 27) Order 1987 SI 1987/713
- Crown Court (Advance Notice of Expert Evidence) Rules 1987 SI 1987/716
- Industrial Training Levy (Plastics Processing) Order 1987 SI 1987/717
- Saithe (Specified Sea Areas) (Prohibition of Fishing) Order 1987 SI 1987/718
- Merchant Shipping Act 1979 (Commencement No. 12) Order 1987 SI 1987/719
- A316 (County of Surrey Boundary to M3 Trunking) Order 1987 SI 1987/720
- Building Societies (Prescribed Bands for Disclosure) Order 1987 SI 1987/723
- Disabled Persons (Services, Consultation and Representation) Act 1986 (Commencement No. 2) Order 1987 SI 1987/729
- Meters (Certification) Order 1987 SI 1987/730
- Milk Marketing Scheme (Amendment) Regulations 1987 SI 1987/735
- National Health Service (General Dental Services) Amendment Regulations 1987 SI 1987/736
- Assured Tenancies (Approved Bodies) (No. 1) Order 1987 SI 1987/737
- Town and Country Planning (Trafford Park Urban Development Area) Special Development Order 1987 SI 1987/738
- Trafford Park Development Corporation (Planning Functions) Order 1987 SI 1987/739
- Aberdeen and District Milk Marketing Scheme (Amendment) Approval Order 1987 SI 1987/740
- North West Water Authority (Returns of Eels Taken) Order 1986 SI 1987/745
- Merchant Shipping (Light Dues) (Amendment No. 2) Regulations 1987 SI 1987/746
- Civil Aviation Act 1980 (Government Shareholding) Order 1987 SI 1987/747
- Cambridge Water Order 1987 SI 1987/750
- Trade Marks and Service Marks (Fees) Rules 1987 SI 1987/751
- Companies (Forms) (Amendment) Regulations 1987 SI 1987/752
- Patents (Fees) (Amendment) Rules 1987 SI 1987/753
- Housing and Planning Act 1986 (Commencement No. 5) Order 1987 SI 1987/754
- Secure Tenancies (Notices) Regulations 1987 SI 1987/755
- Customs and Excise (Community Transit) Regulations 1987 (SI 1987/763)
- Town and Country Planning (Use Classes) Order 1987 (SI 1987/764)
- Town and Country Planning General Development (Amendment) (No. 2) Order 1987 (SI 1987/765)
- Coal Industry (Restructuring Grants) Order 1987 SI 1987/770
- Court of Session etc. Fees Amendment (No.2) Order 1987 SI 1987/771
- High Court of Justiciary Fees Amendment Order 1987 SI 1987/772
- Patronage (Benefices) Rules 1987 SI 1987/773
- Wireless Telegraphy (Cordless Telephone Apparatus) (Restriction) Order 1987 SI 1987/774
- Wireless Telegraphy (Exemption) (Amendment) (Cordless Telephone Apparatus) Regulations 1987 SI 1987/775
- Wireless Telegraphy (Exemption) (Amendment) (Model Control Apparatus) Regulations 1987 SI 1987/776
- Value Added Tax (Construction of Buildings) Order 1987 SI 1987/781
- Control of Pollution (Anti-Fouling Paints and Treatments) Regulations 1987 SI 1987/783
- Heathrow Taxi Sharing Scheme Order 1987 SI 1987/784
- Rate Limitation (Designation of Authorities) (Exemption) Order 1987 SI 1987/785
- Rate Limitation (Designation of Authorities) (Exemption) (Wales) Order 1987 SI 1987/786
- Administration of Justice Act 1985 (Commencement No.4) Order 1987 SI 1987/787
- Licensed Conveyancers' Discipline and Appeals Committee (Legal Assessor) Rules 1987 SI 1987/788
- Licensed Conveyancers' Discipline and Appeals Committee (Procedure) Rules Approval Order 1987 SI 1987/789
- Infectious Diseases of Horses Order 1987 SI 1987/790
- Devon County Council (Exeter, River Exe Bridge) Scheme 1985 Confirmation Instrument 1987 SI 1987/791
- London—Penzance Trunk Road A303 (Sparkford Bypass) Order 1987 SI 1987/792
- London—Penzance Trunk Road A303 (Sparkford Bypass) (Detrunking) Order 1987 SI 1987/793
- Valuation Timetable (Scotland) Amendment (No. 2) Order 1987 SI 1987/794
- Building (Inner London) Regulations 1987 SI 1987/798
- Family Provision (Intestate Succession) Order 1987 SI 1987/799
- Fresh Meat Export (Hygiene and Inspection) (Scotland) Regulations 1987 SI 1987/800

=== 801–900 ===
- Unlicensed Place of Refreshment Wages Council (Variation) Order 1987 SI 1987/801
- Measuring Instruments (EEC Initial Verification Requirements) (Fees) (Amendment) Regulations 1987 SI 1987/802
- Measuring Instruments (EEC Pattern Approval Requirements) (Fees) Regulations 1987 SI 1987/803
- Town and Country Planning (Control of Advertisements) (Amendment) Regulations 1987 SI 1987/804
- Community Drivers' Hours and Recording Equipment (Exemptions and Supplementary Provisions) (Amendment) Regulations 1987 SI 1987/805
- Value Added Tax (Terminal Markets) (Amendment) Order 1987 SI 1987/806
- Disablement Services Authority (Establishment and Constitution) Order 1987 SI 1987/808
- Disablement Services Authority Regulations 1987 SI 1987/809
- Offshore Installations (Safety Zones) (No. 28) Order 1987 SI 1987/812
- Offshore Installations (Safety Zones) (No. 29) Order 1987 SI 1987/813
- Offshore Installations (Safety Zones) (No. 30) Order 1987 SI 1987/814
- Anglian Water Authority (Littleport and Downham Internal Drainage District) Order 1987 SI 1987/815
- Petroleum Act 1987 (Commencement No. 1) Order 1987 SI 1987/820
- Court Funds Rules 1987 SI 1987/821
- Assured Tenancies (Approved Bodies) (No.2) Order 1987 SI 1987/822
- Civil Legal Aid (Scotland) (Fees) Amendment Regulations 1987 SI 1987/823
- Criminal Legal Aid (Scotland) (Fees) Amendment Regulations 1987 SI 1987/824
- Legal Aid (Scotland) (Fees in Civil Proceedings) Amendment Regulations 1987 SI 1987/825
- Legal Aid (Scotland) (Fees in Criminal Proceedings) Amendment Regulations 1987 SI 1987/826
- Public Telecommunication System Designation (British Cable Services Limited) Order 1987 SI 1987/827
- Sheep Scab (Amendment) Order 1987 SI 1987/836
- Sumburgh Airport Shops Order 1987 SI 1987/837
- Sumburgh Airport Licensing (Liquor) Order 1987 SI 1987/838
- London (British Rail) Taxi Sharing Scheme Order 1987 SI 1987/839
- A604 Catthorpe-Harwich Trunk Road (Thrapston to Brampton Section and Slip Roads) Order (No.2) 1987 SI 1987/840
- Goods Vehicles (Operators' Licences, Qualifications and Fees) (Amendment) Regulations 1987 SI 1987/841
- Bristol Waterworks Order 1987 SI 1987/842
- Sullom Voe, Shetland, Pilotage (Amendment) Order 1987 SI 1987/843
- Income Tax (Building Societies) (Amendment) Regulations 1987 SI 1987/844
- Police Regulations 1987 SI 1987/851
- Public Order Act 1986 (Commencement No. 3) Order 1987 SI 1987/852
- Public Order (Football Exclusion) Order 1987 SI 1987/853
- Merchant Shipping (Fees) (Amendment) (No. 2) Regulations 1987 SI 1987/854
- Carriage of Passengers and their Luggage by Sea (United Kingdom Carriers) Order 1987 SI 1987/855
- Treaty of Peace (Bulgaria) Vesting Order 1948 Revocation Order 1987 SI 1987/856
- Treaty of Peace (Hungary) Vesting Order 1948 Revocation Order 1987 SI 1987/857
- Treaty of Peace (Roumania) Vesting Order 1948 Revocation Order 1987 SI 1987/858
- Financial Services (Disclosure of Information) (Designated Authorities No.2) Order 1987. SI 1987/859
- Value Added Tax (Finance) Order 1987 SI 1987/860
- Social Security Revaluation of Earnings Factors Order 1987 SI 1987/861
- Wages Councils (Meetings and Procedure) Regulations 1987 SI 1987/862
- Wages Councils (Notices) Regulations 1987 SI 1987/863
- Students' Allowances (Scotland) Regulations 1987 SI 1987/864
- Act of Sederunt (Fees of Solicitors in the Sheriff Court) (Amendment) 1987 SI 1987/865
- Gas Act 1986 (Government Shareholding) Order 1987 SI 1987/866
- Importation of Bees (Amendment) Order 1987 SI 1987/867
- Statutory Sick Pay (General) Amendment (No.2) Regulations 1987 SI 1987/868
- International Carriage of Perishable Foodstuffs (Vehicles With Thin Side Walls) Regulations 1987 SI 1987/869
- Milk Quota (Calculation of Standard Quota) (Scotland) Amendment (No. 2) Order 1987 SI 1987/870
- Act of Sederunt (Rules of Court Amendment No. 2) (Solicitors' Fees) 1987 SI 1987/871
- Stansted Airport Aircraft Movement Limit Order 1987 SI 1987/874
- British Nuclear Fuels plc (Financial Limit) Order 1987 SI 1987/875
- Lawnmowers (Harmonization of Noise Emission Standards) (Amendment) Regulations 1987 SI 1987/876
- Medicines (Child Safety) Amendment Regulations 1987 SI 1987/877
- Social Security (Claims and Payments) Amendment Regulations 1987 SI 1987/878
- Education (Schools and Further Education) (Amendment) Regulations 1987 SI 1987/879
- Import and Export (Plant Health Fees) (Scotland) Order 1987 SI 1987/880
- Milk (Community Outgoers' Scheme) (Scotland) Amendment (No. 2) Regulations 1987 SI 1987/881
- Milk (Cessation of Production) (Scotland) Scheme 1987 SI 1987/882
- Advice and Assistance (Scotland) Amendment Regulations 1987 SI 1987/883
- Merchant Shipping (Certification of Deck and Marine Engineer Officers and Licensing of Marine Engine Operators) (Amendment) Regulations 1987 SI 1987/884
- Food Protection (Emergency Prohibitions) (Wales) (No. 2) Amendment No. 3 Order 1987 SI 1987/885
- Income Tax (Official Rate of Interest on Beneficial Loans) (No. 2) Order 1987 SI 1987/886
- Inheritance Tax and Capital Transfer Tax (Interest on Unpaid Tax) Order 1987 SI 1987/887
- Stamp Duty Reserve Tax (Interest on Tax Repaid) (No. 2) Order 1987 SI 1987/888
- Acquisition of Land (Rate of Interest after Entry) (No. 2) Regulations 1987 SI 1987/889
- Acquisition of Land (Rate of Interest after Entry) (Scotland) (No. 2) Regulations 1987 SI 1987/890
- Building Societies Appeal Tribunal Regulations 1987 SI 1987/891
- Estate Duty (Interest on Unpaid Duty) Order 1987 SI 1987/892
- Estate Duty (Northern Ireland) (Interest on Unpaid Duty) Order 1987 SI 1987/893
- Legal Aid (Scotland) (Fees in Civil Proceedings) Amendment (No.2) Regulations 1987 SI 1987/894
- Civil Legal Aid (Scotland) (Fees) Amendment (No.2) Regulations 1987 SI 1987/895
- Industrial Training Levy (Hotel and Catering) Order 1987 SI 1987/896
- Greenwich (Prescribed Routes) (No.5) Traffic Order 1973 (Variation) Order 1987 SI 1987/897
- Income Tax (Interest on Unpaid Tax and Repayment Supplement) (No. 2) Order 1987 SI 1987/898
- Returning Officers' Expenses Regulations 1987 SI 1987/899
- Returning Officers' Expenses (Northern Ireland) Regulations 1987 SI 1987/900

=== 901–1000 ===
- Meters (Determination of Questions) (Expenses) Regulations 1987 SI 1987/901
- Crown Prosecution Service (Witnesses' Allowances) (Amendment No.4) Regulations 1987 SI 1987/902
- Representation of the People (Variation of Limits of Candidates' Election Expenses) Order 1987 SI 1987/903
- Artificial Insemination of Cattle (Advertising Controls etc.) (Great Britain) Regulations 1987 SI 1987/904
- Marek's Disease (Restriction on Vaccination) Order 1987 SI 1987/905
- Food Protection (Emergency Prohibitions) (England) (No. 2) Amendment No. 3 Order 1987 SI 1987/906
- Financial Services Act 1986 (Commencement) (No. 5) Order 1987 SI 1987/907
- Milk (Cessation of Production) (England and Wales) Scheme 1987 SI 1987/908
- Milk (Community Outgoers Scheme) (England and Wales) (Amendment) (No.2) Regulations 1987 SI 1987/909
- Medicines (Products Other Than Veterinary Drugs) (General Sale List) Amendment Order 1987 SI 1987/910
- Disabled Persons (Services, Consultation and Representation) Act 1986 (Commencement No. 3) (Scotland) Order 1987 SI 1987/911
- National Library of Wales (Delivery of Books) (Amendment) Regulations 1987 SI 1987/918
- New Valuation Lists Order 1987 Approved by both Houses of Parliament SI 1987/921
- Black Country Development Corporation (Area and Constitution) Order 1987 SI 1987/922
- Teesside Development Corporation (Area and Constitution) Order 1987 SI 1987/923
- Tyne and Wear Development Corporation (Area and Constitution) Order 1987 SI 1987/924
- Financial Services (Transfer of Functions Relating to Friendly Societies) Order 1987 SI 1987/925
- European Communities (Designation) (No.2) Order 1987 SI 1987/926
- International Headquarters and Defence Organisations (Designation and Privileges) (Amendment) Order 1987 SI 1987/927
- Visiting Forces and International Headquarters (Application of Law) (Amendment) Order 1987 SI 1987/928
- Race Relations (Offshore Employment) Order 1987 SI 1987/929
- Sex Discrimination and Equal Pay (Offshore Employment) Order 1987 SI 1987/930
- Carriage of Passengers and their Luggage by Sea (Parties to Convention) Order 1987 SI 1987/931
- Merchant Shipping (Confirmation of Legislation) (Anguilla) Order 1987 SI 1987/932
- Merchant Shipping (Confirmation of Legislation) (Gibraltar) Order 1987 SI 1987/933
- Turks and Caicos Islands (Constitution) (Interim Amendment) Order 1987 SI 1987/934
- Social Security (Australia) Order 1987 SI 1987/935
- Industrial Relations (Northern Ireland) Order 1987 SI 1987/936
- Parliamentary Constituencies (England) (Miscellaneous Changes) (No.2) Order 1987 SI 1987/937
- Police (Northern Ireland) Order 1986 SI 1987/938
- Registration of Title Order 1987 SI 1987/939
- Copyright (Singapore) Order 1987 SI 1987/940
- Lord Chancellor's Salary Order 1987 SI 1987/941
- Financial Services Act 1986 (Delegation) Order 1987 SI 1987/942
- Definition of Capital Expenses (Scotland) Order 1987 SI 1987/943
- Nurses, Midwives and Health Visitors (Temporary Registration) Amendment Rules Approval Order 1987 SI 1987/944
- Essex County Council (Maldon Bypass) (Blackwater Canal Bridge) Scheme 1986 Confirmation Instrument 1987 SI 1987/945
- Essex County Council (Maldon Bypass) (Chelmer Viaduct Scheme 1986 Confirmation Instrument 1987 SI 1987/946
- Essex County Council (Maldon Bypass) (Whiteladies Canal Bridge) Scheme 1986 Confirmation Instrument 1987 SI 1987/947
- Tendring Hundred Water (Stoke-by-Nayland Boreholes) Order 1987 SI 1987/948
- Sheep and Goats (Removal to Northern Ireland) (Amendment) Regulations 1987 SI 1987/949
- North Norfolk (Extension and Amendment) Light Railway Order 1987 (SI 1987/950)
- Trade Marks and Service Marks (Fees) (Amendment) Rules 1987 SI 1987/964
- Customs Duties (ECSC) (No. 2) (Amendment No. 6) Order 1987 SI 1987/973
- Offshore Installations (Safety Zones) (No. 31) Order 1987 SI 1987/974
- Offshore Installations (Safety Zones) (No. 32) Order 1987 SI 1987/975
- Offshore Installations (Safety Zones) (No. 33) Order 1987 SI 1987/976
- Offshore Installations (Safety Zones) (No. 34) Order 1987 SI 1987/977
- Offshore Installations (Safety Zones) (No. 35) Order 1987 SI 1987/978
- Offshore Installations (Safety Zones) (No. 36) Order 1987 SI 1987/979
- Offshore Installations (Safety Zones) (No. 37) Order 1987 SI 1987/980
- Offshore Installations (Safety Zones) (No. 38) Order 1987 SI 1987/981
- Offshore Installations (Safety Zones) (No. 39) Order 1987 SI 1987/982
- Offshore Installations (Safety Zones) (No. 40) Order 1987 SI 1987/983
- Offshore Installations (Safety Zones) (No. 41) Order 1987 SI 1987/984
- Offshore Installations (Safety Zones) (No. 42) Order 1987 SI 1987/985
- Offshore Installations (Safety Zones) (No. 43) Order 1987 SI 1987/986
- Offshore Installations (Safety Zones) (No. 44) Order 1987 SI 1987/987
- Offshore Installations (Safety Zones) (No. 45) Order 1987 SI 1987/988
- Offshore Installations (Safety Zones) (Revocation) (No. 4) Order 1987 SI 1987/989
- North of Newcastle-under-Lyme—Tarvin Trunk Road (A51 Diversion North of Hurleston) Order 1987 SI 1987/990
- A41 Trunk Road (Edgware Way, Barnet) (Prescribed Routes) Order 1987 SI 1987/998
- London Cab Order 1987 SI 1987/999

=== 1001–1100 ===
- London—Great Yarmouth Trunk Road A12 (Saxmundham Bypass, Suffolk) Order 1987 SI 1987/1013
- Scottish Transport Group (Scalasaig Pier) Harbour Revision Order 1987 SI 1987/1016
- Diplomatic and Consular Premises Act 1987 (Commencement No.1) Order 1987 SI 1987/1022
- A52 Nottingham–West of Grantham Trunk Road (Bottesford Bypass) Order 1987 SI 1987/1025
- A52 Nottingham—West of Grantham Trunk Road (Bottesford Bypass) Detrunking Order 1987 SI 1987/1026
- Foreign Compensation (Financial Provisions) (No.2) Order 1987 SI 1987/1028
- Arbitration (Foreign Awards) Order 1987 SI 1987/1029
- Copyright (Singapore) (Amendment) Order 1987 SI 1987/1030
- Lothian Regional Council (Megget Reservoir etc.) (Amendment) Water Order 1987 SI 1987/1032
- London—Holyhead Trunk Road A5 (Chirk By-pass) Order 1987 SI 1987/1037
- London-Holyhead Trunk Road A5 (Rhoswiel–Whitehurst Detrunking) Order 1987 SI 1987/1038
- A41 Trunk Road (Watford Way, Barnet) (Prescribed Routes) Order 1987 SI 1987/1048
- Customs Duties (ECSC) (No. 2) (Amendment No.7) Order 1987 SI 1987/1053
- Northumbrian Water Authority (T Nets) (Southern Area) Order 1987 SI 1987/1054
- M40 London—Oxford—Birmingham Motorway (Waterstock to Warwick Section) and Connecting Roads (No 1) Scheme 1984 Variation Scheme 1987 SI 1987/1057
- Criminal Justice Act 1987 (Commencement No. 1) Order 1987 SI 1987/1061
- Police Federation (Amendment) Regulations 1987 SI 1987/1062
- International Carriage of Perishable Foodstuffs (Amendment) Regulations 1987 SI 1987/1066
- A41(M) Watford-Tring Motorway and Connecting Roads (Tring Bypass Section) (Partial Revocation) Scheme 1987 SI 1987/1070
- Value Added Tax (Construction of Buildings) (No. 2) Order 1987 SI 1987/1072
- Local Government Reorganisation (Property) (West Midlands) Order 1987 SI 1987/1077
- Act of Sederunt (Shorthand Writers' Fees) 1987 SI 1987/1078
- Act of Sederunt (Rules of Court Amendment No.3) (Shorthand Writers' Fees) 1987 SI 1987/1079
- Yorkshire Dales Light Railway Order 1987 (SI 1987/1088)
- Cereal Seeds (Amendment) Regulations 1987 SI 1987/1091
- Fodder Plant Seeds (Amendment) Regulations 1987 SI 1987/1092
- Vegetable Seeds (Amendment) Regulations 1987 SI 1987/1093
- Offshore Installations (Safety Zones) (No. 46) Order 1987 SI 1987/1094
- Offshore Installations (Safety Zones) (No. 47) Order 1987 SI 1987/1095
- Social Security Act 1986 (Commencement No.7) Order 1987 SI 1987/1096
- Oil and Fibre Plant Seeds (Amendment) Regulations 1987 SI 1987/1097
- Seeds (Registration, Licensing and Enforcement) (Amendment) Regulations 1987 SI 1987/1098
- Contracting-out (Transfer) Amendment Regulations 1987 SI 1987/1099
- Contracting-out (Widowers' Guaranteed Minimum Pensions) Regulations 1987 SI 1987/1100

=== 1101–1200 ===
- Money Purchase Contracted-out Schemes Regulations 1987 SI 1987/1101
- Occupational Pension Schemes (Auditors) Regulations 1987 SI 1987/1102
- Occupational Pension Schemes (Contracted-out Protected Rights Premiums) Regulations 1987 SI 1987/1103
- Occupational Pension Schemes (Contracting-out) Amendment Regulations 1987 SI 1987/1104
- Occupational Pension Schemes (Disclosure of Information) (Amendment) Regulations 1987 SI 1987/1105
- Occupational Pension Schemes (Qualifying Service—Consequential and Other Provisions) Regulations 1987 SI 1987/1106
- Occupational Pension Schemes (Transfer Values) Amendment Regulations 1987 SI 1987/1107
- Pension Schemes (Voluntary Contributions Requirements and Voluntary and Compulsory Membership) Regulations 1987 SI 1987/1108
- Personal Pension Schemes (Appropriate Schemes) Regulations 1987 SI 1987/1109
- Personal Pension Schemes (Disclosure of Information) Regulations 1987 SI 1987/1110
- Personal Pension Schemes (Personal Pension Protected Rights Premiums) Regulations 1987 SI 1987/1111
- Personal Pension Schemes (Transfer Values) Regulations 1987 SI 1987/1112
- Personal and Occupational Pension Schemes (Abatement of Benefit) Regulations 1987 SI 1987/1113
- Personal and Occupational Pension Schemes (Consequential Provisions) Regulations 1987 SI 1987/1114
- Personal and Occupational Pension Schemes (Incentive Payments) Regulations 1987 SI 1987/1115
- Personal and Occupational Pension Schemes (Modification of Enactments) Regulations 1987 SI 1987/1116
- Personal and Occupational Pension Schemes (Protected Rights) Regulations 1987 SI 1987/1117
- Protected Rights (Transfer Payment) Regulations 1987 SI 1987/1118
- County Court (Forms) (Amendment) Rules 1987 SI 1987/1119
- General Medical Council (Constitution of Fitness to Practise Committees) (Amendment) Rules Order of Council 1987 SI 1987/1120
- Customs Duties (Quota Relief) Order 1987 SI 1987/1122
- Medicines (Exemptions from Restrictions on the Retail Sale or Supply of Veterinary Drugs) (Amendment) Order 1987 SI 1987/1123
- Employment Subsidies Act 1978 (Renewal) (Great Britain) Order 1987 SI 1987/1124
- Customs Duties (ECSC) (No. 2) (Amendment No. 8) Order 1987 SI 1987/1125
- Education (Grant) (Amendment) Regulations 1987 SI 1987/1126
- Inheritance Tax (Delivery of Accounts) Regulations 1987 SI 1987/1127
- Inheritance Tax (Delivery of Accounts) (Scotland) Regulations 1987 SI 1987/1128
- Inheritance Tax (Delivery of Accounts) (Northern Ireland) Regulations 1987 SI 1987/1129
- Inheritance Tax (Double Charges Relief) Regulations 1987 SI 1987/1130
- Restriction on Agreements and Conduct (Tour Operators) Order 1987 SI 1987/1131
- London City Airport Byelaws (Designation) Order 1987 SI 1987/1132
- Road Vehicles (Construction and Use) (Amendment) (No.2) Regulations 1987 SI 1987/1133
- Fish Farming (Financial Assistance) Scheme 1987 SI 1987/1134
- Fishing Vessels (Acquisition and Improvement) (Grants) Scheme 1987 SI 1987/1135
- Fishing Vessels (Financial Assistance) Scheme 1987 SI 1987/1136
- Justices of the Peace (Size and Chairmanship of Bench) (Amendment) Rules 1987 SI 1987/1137
- Education (Grants) (City Technology Colleges) Regulations 1987 SI 1987/1138
- Lands Tribunal for Scotland (Amendment) (Fees) Rules 1987 SI 1987/1139
- Education (Abolition of Corporal Punishment: Prescription of Schools) (Scotland) Order 1987 SI 1987/1140
- Financial Services (Disclosure of Information) (Designated Authorities) (No.3) Order 1987 SI 1987/1141
- Video Recordings Act 1984 (Commencement No. 5) Order 1987 SI 1987/1142
- London Pilotage (Amendment) Order 1987 SI 1987/1143
- Motor Vehicles (Tests) (Amendment) Regulations 1987 SI 1987/1144
- Rules of the Air and Air Traffic Control (Third Amendment) Regulations 1987 SI 1987/1145
- St Mary's Music School (Aided Places) Amendment Regulations 1987 SI 1987/1146
- Education (Assisted Places) (Scotland) Amendment Regulations 1987 SI 1987/1147
- Seeds (Fees) (Amendment) Regulations 1987 SI 1987/1148
- Goods Vehicles (Prohibitions) (Exemptions and Appeals) Regulations 1987 SI 1987/1149
- Public Passenger Vehicles (Exemptions, and Appeals against Refusals to Issue Certificates or Remove Prohibitions) Regulations 1987 SI 1987/1150
- Further Education (Recoupment) Regulations 1987 SI 1987/1158
- Education (No. 2) Act 1986 (Commencement No. 3) Order 1987 SI 1987/1159
- Education (Governing Bodies of Institutions of Further Education) Regulations 1987 SI 1987/1160
- Easington Lagoons (Area of Special Protection) Order 1987 SI 1987/1163
- Assured Tenancies (Approved Bodies) (No. 3) Order 1987 SI 1987/1164
- Food Protection (Emergency Prohibitions) Order 1987 SI 1987/1165
- Non-Contentious Probate Fees (Amendment) Order 1987 SI 1987/1176
- Recognition of Trusts Act 1987 (Commencement) Order 1987 SI 1987/1177
- Food Protection (Emergency Prohibitions) (Wales) Order 1987 SI 1987/1181
- Direct Grant Schools (Amendment) Regulations 1987 SI 1987/1182
- Education (Abolition of Corporal Punishment) (Independent Schools) Regulations 1987 SI 1987/1183
- Eggs (Marketing Standards) (Amendment) Regulations 1987 SI 1987/1184
- Banking Act 1987 (Commencement No. 1) Order 1987 SI 1987/1189
- Home-Grown Cereals Authority (Rate of Levy) Order 1987 SI 1987/1194
- Blood Tests (Evidence of Paternity) (Amendment) Regulations 1987 SI 1987/1199
- Gaming (Amendment) Act 1987 (Commencement) Order 1987 SI 1987/1200

=== 1201–1300 ===
- Petty Sessional Divisions (Gwynedd) Order 1987 SI 1987/1201
- Home Purchase Assistance (Recognised Lending Institutions) Order 1987 SI 1987/1202
- Housing (Right to Buy) (Priority of Charges) Order 1987 SI 1987/1203
- Mortgage Indemnities (Recognised Bodies) Order 1987 SI 1987/1204
- Carlisle—Sunderland Trunk Road (A69) (Brampton Bypass) Order 1987 SI 1987/1205
- Act of Sederunt (Rules of Court Amendment No.4) (Miscellaneous) 1987 SI 1987/1206
- Northern Ireland Act 1974 (Interim Period Extension) Order 1987 SI 1987/1207
- Heather and Grass etc. (Burning) (Amendment) Regulations 1987 SI 1987/1208
- Prevention of Terrorism (Supplemental Temporary Provisions) (Amendment No. 2) Order 1987 SI 1987/1209
- Customs Duties (ECSC) (No. 2) (Amendment No. 9) Order 1987 SI 1987/1218
- Income Tax (Interest Relief) (Qualifying Lenders) Order 1987 SI 1987/1224
- Coal Industry Social Welfare Organisation (Amendment of Memorandum and Articles) Order 1987 SI 1987/1225
- Mineworkers' Pension Scheme Order 1987 SI 1987/1226
- Plaice and Saithe (Specified Sea Areas) (Prohibition of Fishing) Order 1987 SI 1987/1227
- Transport Act 1985 (Commencement No.7) Order 1987 SI 1987/1228
- Section 19 Minibus (Designated Bodies) Order 1987 SI 1987/1229
- Minibus and Other Section 19 Permit Buses Regulations 1987 SI 1987/1230
- Building Standards (Scotland) Amendment Regulations 1987 SI 1987/1231
- Building (Procedure) (Scotland) Amendment Regulations 1987 SI 1987/1232
- Thames Water Authority (Amendment of Local Enactments) Order 1987 SI 1987/1233
- Yorkshire Water Authority (Howe Bridge Boreholes) Order 1987 SI 1987/1234
- Yorkshire Water Authority (Catterick Boreholes) Order 1987 SI 1987/1235
- Yorkshire Water Authority (Cayton Borehole) Order 1987 SI 1987/1236
- Yorkshire Water Authority (Studforth Boreholes) Order 1987 SI 1987/1237
- Urban Development Corporations (Financial Limits) Order 1987 SI 1987/1238
- Northern Ireland (Emergency Provisions) Act 1987 (Commencement No.1) Order 1987 SI 1987/1241
- Children Act 1975 and the Adoption Act 1976 (Commencement No. 2) Order 1987 SI 1987/1242
- Video Recordings Act 1984 (Scotland) (Commencement No.5) Order 1987 SI 1987/1249
- Medicines (Products Other Than Veterinary Drugs) (Prescription Only) Amendment (No. 2) Order 1987 SI 1987/1250
- Rate Limitation (Designation of Authorities) (Exemption) (Wales) (No. 2) Order 1987 SI 1987/1251
- Asian Development Bank (Fourth Replenishment of the Asian Development Fund) Order 1987 SI 1987/1252
- Commonwealth Development Corporation (Additional Enterprises) Order 1987 SI 1987/1253
- Chevening Estate Act 1987 (Commencement) Order 1987 SI 1987/1254
- Detention Centre (Amendment) Rules 1987 SI 1987/1255
- Prison (Amendment) Rules 1987 SI 1987/1256
- Youth Custody Centre (Amendment) Rules 1987 SI 1987/1257
- Redundant Mineworkers and Concessionary Coal (Payments Schemes) (Amendment) Order 1987 SI 1987/1258
- Value Added Tax (Education) Order 1987 SI 1987/1259
- Reverter of Sites Act 1987 (Commencement) Order 1987 SI 1987/1260
- Education (Mandatory Awards) Regulations 1987 SI 1987/1261
- Army, Air Force and Naval Discipline Acts (Continuation) Order 1987 SI 1987/1262
- Admiralty Jurisdiction (Gibraltar) Order 1987 SI 1987/1263
- Consular Fees Order 1987 SI 1987/1264
- Continental Shelf (Designated Areas) (Extended Territorial Sea) Order 1987 SI 1987/1265
- Evidence (Proceedings in Other Jurisdictions) (Turks and Caicos Islands) Order 1987 SI 1987/1266
- Merchant Shipping (Confirmation of Legislation) (Cayman Islands) Order 1987 SI 1987/1267
- St. Helena (Constitution) (Amendment) Order 1987 SI 1987/1268
- Territorial Sea (Limits) Order 1987 SI 1987/1269
- Territorial Sea Act 1987 (Commencement) Order 1987 SI 1987/1270
- Turks and Caicos Islands (Constitution) (Interim Amendment) (No. 2) Order 1987 SI 1987/1271
- Health Service Commissioner for England (Disablement Services Authority) Order 1987 SI 1987/1272
- Alderney (Transfer of Property etc.) Order 1987 SI 1987/1273
- Appropriation (No. 2) (Northern Ireland) Order 1987 SI 1987/1274
- Electricity Supply (Amendment) (Northern Ireland) Order 1987 SI 1987/1275
- Friendly Societies Act 1984 (Jersey) Order 1987 SI 1987/1276
- Licensing (Northern Ireland) Order 1987 SI 1987/1277
- Registration of Clubs (Northern Ireland) Order 1987 SI 1987/1278
- Methodist Church Act 1976 (Guernsey) Order 1987 SI 1987/1279
- Occupiers' Liability (Northern Ireland) Order 1987 SI 1987/1280
- Protection of Military Remains Act 1986 (Guernsey) Order 1987 SI 1987/1281
- Reciprocal Enforcement of Maintenance Orders (Hague Convention Countries) (Variation) Order 1987 SI 1987/1282
- Jury Trial (Amendment) (Northern Ireland) Order 1987 SI 1987/1283
- Merchant Shipping (Fishing Boats Registry) (Amendment) Order 1987 SI 1987/1284
- Pupils' Registration (Amendment) Regulations 1987 SI 1987/1285
- Local Government Reorganisation (Property) (Tyne and Wear) Order 1987 SI 1987/1288
- Banking Act 1987 (Disclosure of Information) (Specified Persons) Order 1987 SI 1987/1292
- Stock Transfer (Gilt-edged Securities) (CGO Service) (Amendment) Regulations 1987 SI 1987/1293
- Stock Transfer (Gilt-edged Securities) (Exempt Transfer) Regulations 1987 SI 1987/1294
- Legal Officers (Annual Fees) Order 1987 SI 1987/1296
- Ecclesiastical Judges and Legal Officers (Fees) Order 1987 SI 1987/1297
- Merchant Shipping (Closing of Openings in Hulls and in Watertight Bulkheads) Regulations 1987 SI 1987/1298
- Banking Appeal Tribunal Regulations 1987 SI 1987/1299

=== 1301–1400 ===
- Firemen's Pension Scheme (Amendment) Order 1987 SI 1987/1302
- Meat and Livestock Commission Levy Scheme (Confirmation) Order 1987 SI 1987/1303
- Data Protection (Fees) (No. 2) Regulations 1987 SI 1987/1304
- Pensioners' Lump Sum Payments Order 1987 SI 1987/1305
- Pilotage Act 1987 (Commencement No. 1) Order 1987 SI 1987/1306
- Parliamentary and other Pensions Act 1987 (Commencement No.1) Order 1987 SI 1987/1311
- Education (Assisted Places) (Amendment) Regulations 1987 SI 1987/1312
- Education (Assisted Places) (Incidental Expenses) (Amendment) Regulations 1987 SI 1987/1313
- Education (Grants) (Music and Ballet Schools) (Amendment) Regulations 1987 SI 1987/1314
- Road Vehicles Lighting (Amendment) Regulations 1987 SI 1987/1315
- Severn-Trent Water Authority (Wallgrange Boreholes) Order 1987 SI 1987/1322
- Supplementary Benefit (Requirements and Resources) Amendment Regulations 1987 SI 1987/1325
- Road Vehicles (Marking of Special Weights) (Amendment) Regulations 1987 SI 1987/1326
- Motor Vehicles (Authorisation of Special Types) (Amendment) Order 1987 SI 1987/1327
- Act of Adjournal (Service of Documents on Accused Persons) 1987 SI 1987/1328
- Rate Support Grant (Scotland) (No.2) Order 1987 SI 1987/1329
- Petroleum Act 1987 (Commencement No. 2) Order 1987 SI 1987/1330
- Offshore Installations (Safety Zones) Regulations 1987 SI 1987/1331
- Offshore Installations (Safety Zones) (No. 48) Order 1987 SI 1987/1332
- (A65) Liverpool-Preston-Leeds Trunk Road (Addingham Bypass) Order 1987 SI 1987/1333
- (A65) Liverpool—Preston—Leeds Trunk Road (Heathness Gill to Lumb Gill Lane) (Detrunking) Order 1987 SI 1987/1334
- Further Education Act 1985 (Commencement No.2) (Scotland) Order 1987 SI 1987/1335
- Banking Appeal Tribunal (Scottish Appeals) Regulations 1987 SI 1987/1336
- Bunk Beds (Entrapment Hazards) (Safety) Regulations 1987 SI 1987/1337
- Petroleum Revenue Tax (Nomination Scheme for Disposals and Appropriations) Regulations 1987 SI 1987/1338
- Job Release Act 1977 (Continuation) Order 1987 SI 1987/1339
- Black Country Development Corporation (Planning Functions) Order 1987 SI 1987/1340
- Teesside Development Corporation (Planning Functions) Order 1987 SI 1987/1341
- Tyne and Wear Development Corporation (Planning Functions) Order 1987 SI 1987/1342
- Town and Country Planning (Black Country Urban Development Area) Special Development Order 1987 SI 1987/1343
- Town and Country Planning (Teesside Urban Development Area) Special Development Order 1987 SI 1987/1344
- Town and Country Planning (Tyne and Wear Urban Development Area) Special Development Order 1987 SI 1987/1345
- Building Societies Investor Protection Scheme (Maximum Protected Investment) Order 1987 SI 1987/1349
- Export of Goods (Control) (Amendment No. 10) Order 1987 SI 1987/1350
- (A168) Boroughbridge-Thirsk Trunk Road (Dishforth Interchange, Slip Roads and Link Roads) Order 1987 SI 1987/1353
- Wessex Water Authority (Blashford Lakes Discharge) Order 1987 SI 1987/1354
- Legal Advice and Assistance (Scotland) Amendment Regulations 1987 SI 1987/1355
- Advice and Assistance (Scotland) Amendment (No.2) Regulations 1987 SI 1987/1356
- Legal Aid (Scotland) (Fees in Criminal Proceedings) Amendment (No.2) Regulations 1987 SI 1987/1357
- Criminal Legal Aid (Scotland) (Fees) Amendment (No.2) Regulations 1987 SI 1987/1358
- Education (School Government) Regulations 1987 SI 1987/1359
- Thames Water Authority (Transfer of Property of Dartford and Crayford Navigation Commissioners) Order 1987 SI 1987/1360
- Education (Fees and Awards) (Amendment) Regulations 1987 SI 1987/1364
- State Awards (Amendment) Regulations 1987 SI 1987/1365
- Education Authority Bursaries (Scotland) Amendment Regulations 1987 SI 1987/1366
- M3 Motorway (Compton—Bassett Section) Scheme 1987 SI 1987/1367
- M3 Motorway (Compton—Bassett Section) Connecting Roads Scheme 1987 SI 1987/1368
- M3 Motorway (Compton-Bassett Section) (Revocation) Scheme 1987 SI 1987/1369
- M3 Motorway (Compton-Bassett Section) (Revocation) (No.2) Scheme 1987 SI 1987/1370
- M3 Motorway (Hockley—Compton Section) (Revocation) Scheme 1987 SI 1987/1371
- M3 Motorway (Popham—Hockley Section) (Variation) Scheme 1987 SI 1987/1372
- Aerodromes (Designation) (Detention and Sale of Aircraft) Order 1987 SI 1987/1377
- Motor Vehicles (Driving Licences) Regulations 1987 SI 1987/1378
- Grants by Local Housing Authorities (Appropriate Percentage and Exchequer Contributions) Order 1987 SI 1987/1379
- A406 Trunk Road (Angel Road, Enfield) (Prescribed Routes) Order 1987 SI 1987/1380
- Local Authorities (Allowances) (Scotland) Amendment Regulations 1987 SI 1987/1381
- National Health Service (General Medical and Pharmaceutical Services) (Scotland) Amendment (No.3) Regulations 1987 SI 1987/1382
- Education (Fees and Awards) (Scotland) Amendment Regulations 1987 SI 1987/1383
- Local Authorities (Recognised Bodies for Heritable Securities Indemnities) (Scotland) Order 1987 SI 1987/1388
- Housing Corporation (Recognised Bodies for Heritable Securities Indemnities) (Scotland) Order 1987 SI 1987/1389
- Highland Regional Council (Abhainn Greadhain, Glenachulish) Water Order 1987 SI 1987/1390
- Highland Regional Council (Forest Spring, Storr, Skye) Water Order 1987 SI 1987/1391
- Highland Regional Council (Allt Sanna, West Ardnamurchan) Water Order 1987 SI 1987/1392
- Education (Bursaries for Teacher Training) (Amendment) (No. 2) Regulations 1987 SI 1987/1393
- Smoke Control Areas (Exempted Fireplaces) Order 1987 SI 1987/1394
- County Court (Amendment No.2) Rules 1987 SI 1987/1397
- Insolvency (Amendment of Subordinate Legislation) Order 1987 SI 1987/1398
- Offshore Installations (Safety Zones) (Revocation) (No. 5) Order 1987 SI 1987/1399
- Offshore Installations (Safety Zones) (No. 49) Order 1987 SI 1987/1400

=== 1401–1500 ===
- Offshore Installations (Safety Zones) (No. 50) Order 1987 SI 1987/1401
- Offshore Installations (Safety Zones) (No. 51) Order 1987 SI 1987/1402
- Offshore Installations (Safety Zones) (No. 52) Order 1987 SI 1987/1403
- Offshore Installations (Safety Zones) (No. 53) Order 1987 SI 1987/1404
- Offshore Installations (Safety Zones) (No. 54) Order 1987 SI 1987/1405
- Offshore Installations (Safety Zones) (No. 55) Order 1987 SI 1987/1406
- Offshore Installations (Safety Zones) (No. 56) Order 1987 SI 1987/1407
- Offshore Installations (Safety Zones) (No. 57) Order 1987 SI 1987/1408
- Offshore Installations (Safety Zones) (No. 58) Order 1987 SI 1987/1409
- Offshore Installations (Safety Zones) (No. 59) Order 1987 SI 1987/1410
- Offshore Installations (Safety Zones) (No. 60) Order 1987 SI 1987/1411
- Offshore Installations (Safety Zones) (No. 61) Order 1987 SI 1987/1412
- Offshore Installations (Safety Zones) (No. 62) Order 1987 SI 1987/1413
- Offshore Installations (Safety Zones) (No. 63) Order 1987 SI 1987/1414
- Offshore Installations (Safety Zones) (No. 64) Order 1987 SI 1987/1415
- Offshore Installations (Safety Zones) (No. 65) Order 1987 SI 1987/1416
- Offshore Installations (Safety Zones) (No. 66) Order 1987 SI 1987/1417
- Offshore Installations (Safety Zones) (No. 67) Order 1987 SI 1987/1418
- Offshore Installations (Safety Zones) (No. 68) Order 1987 SI 1987/1419
- Offshore Installations (Safety Zones) (No. 69) Order 1987 SI 1987/1420
- Drivers' Hours (Goods Vehicles) (Keeping of Records) Regulations 1987 SI 1987/1421
- Revenue Appeals Order 1987 SI 1987/1422
- Rules of the Supreme Court (Amendment) 1987 SI 1987/1423
- Social Security (Adjudication) Amendment Regulations 1987 SI 1987/1424
- National Health Service (General Medical and Pharmaceutical Services) Amendment (No. 4) Regulations 1987 SI 1987/1425
- Social Security (Attendance Allowance) Amendment Regulations 1987 SI 1987/1426
- Value Added Tax (Cash Accounting) Regulations 1987 SI 1987/1427
- National Health Service (Transferred Staff—Appeals Amendment) Order 1987 SI 1987/1428
- M20 Motorway (Maidstone East Interchange) Connecting Roads Scheme 1987 SI 1987/1429
- Folkestone-Honiton Trunk Road (Dittons-Pevensey Section De-Trunking) Order 1987 SI 1987/1430
- Folkestone—Honiton Trunk Road (A27 Pevensey Bypass and Slip Road) Order 1987 SI 1987/1431
- A4 Trunk Road (Great West Road, Hounslow) (Prescribed Routes) Order 1987 SI 1987/1432
- Education (School Teachers' Pay and Conditions) Order 1987 SI 1987/1433
- East Surrey Water Order 1987 SI 1987/1434
- Hungerford—Hereford Trunk Road (A419) (Stratton St Margaret Bypass Slip Roads) Order 1987 SI 1987/1435
- Food Protection (Emergency Prohibitions) (Wales) (No.2) Order 1987 SI 1987/1436
- Medicines (Fees) Amendment Regulations 1987 SI 1987/1439
- Housing Benefits (Amendment) Regulations 1987 SI 1987/1440
- Knowsley Metropolitan Borough Council (M57 Motorway Associated Special Roads) (Huyton Spur) Revocation Scheme 1987 Confirmation Instrument 1987 SI 1987/1441
- West of Southampton-Bath Trunk Road A36 (Steeple Langford Bypass) Order 1987 SI 1987/1442
- Swanage Light Railway Order 1987 (SI 1987/1443)
- Building (Disabled People) Regulations 1987 (SI 1987/1445)
- Local Government Reorganisation (Property) (Greater Manchester) Order 1987 SI 1987/1446
- Diseases of Animals (Approved Disinfectants) (Amendment) (No. 2) Order 1987 SI 1987/1447
- Food Protection (Emergency Prohibitions) (No.2) Order 1987 SI 1987/1450
- Local Government Reorganisation (Property) (West Yorkshire) (No. 2) Order 1987 SI 1987/1451
- Royal Irish Constabulary (Lump Sum Payments to Widows) Regulations 1987 SI 1987/1461
- Police Pensions (Lump Sum Payments to Widows) Regulations 1987 SI 1987/1462
- Local Government Reorganisation (Property, etc.) (Merseyside) Order 1987 SI 1987/1463
- Crown Office Fees Order 1987 SI 1987/1464
- Agricultural Holdings (Units of Production) Order 1987 SI 1987/1465
- Criminal Justice (Scotland) Act 1987 (Commencement No.1) Order 1987 SI 1987/1468
- Swansea-Manchester Trunk Road A483 (Improvement at Boundary Terrace Llandrindod Wells) Order 1987 SI 1987/1470
- Local Government (Allowances) (Amendment) Regulations 1987 SI 1987/1483
- Lowestoft Pilotage (Amendment) Order 1987 SI 1987/1484
- Abolition of Domestic Rates Etc. (Scotland) Act 1987 Commencement Order 1987 SI 1987/1489
- A65 Skipton—Kendal Trunk Road (Whoop Hall Diversion) Order 1987 SI 1987/1491
- Income Tax (Interest on Unpaid Tax and Repayment Supplement) (No. 3) Order 1987 SI 1987/1492
- Income Tax (Official Rate of Interest on Beneficial Loans) (No. 3) Order 1987 SI 1987/1493
- Stamp Duty Reserve Tax (Interest on Tax Repaid) (No. 3) Order 1987 SI 1987/1494
- Insurance Brokers Registration Council (Indemnity Insurance and Grants Scheme) Rules Approval Order 1987 SI 1987/1496
- Semiconductor Products (Protection of Topography) Regulations 1987 SI 1987/1497
- Building Societies (Isle of Man) Order 1987 SI 1987/1498
- Building Societies (Liquid Asset) Regulations 1987 SI 1987/1499
- Building Societies (Prescribed Contracts) (Amendment) Order 1987 SI 1987/1500

=== 1501–1600 ===
- Data Protection (Subject Access) (Fees) Regulations 1987 SI 1987/1507
- Motor Vehicles (Type Approval for Goods Vehicles) (Great Britain) (Amendment) Regulations 1987 SI 1987/1508
- Motor Vehicles (Type Approval) (Great Britain) (Amendment) Regulations 1987 SI 1987/1509
- National Health Service (General Dental Services) Amendment (No. 2) Regulations 1987 SI 1987/1512
- Occupational Pension Schemes (Maximum Rate Lump Sum) Regulations 1987 SI 1987/1513
- Warkworth Harbour Revision Order 1987 SI 1987/1514
- Food Protection (Emergency Prohibitions) (Wales) (No.3) Order 1987 SI 1987/1515
- Sports Grounds and Sporting Events (Designation) (Amendment) Order 1987 SI 1987/1520
- Counterfeit Goods (Consequential Provisions) Regulations 1987 SI 1987/1521
- Town and Country Planning Appeals (Determination by Appointed Person) (Inquiries Procedure) (Scotland) Amendment Rules 1987 SI 1987/1522
- Materials and Articles in Contact with Food Regulations 1987 SI 1987/1523
- Assured Tenancies (Approved Bodies) (No. 4) Order 1987 SI 1987/1525
- Town and Country Planning (Listed Buildings and Buildings in Conservation Areas) (Scotland) Regulations 1987 SI 1987/1529
- Strathclyde and Dumfries and Galloway Regions and Kyle and Carrick and Wigtown Districts (Lagafater Lodge and Shennas Lodge, New Luce) Boundaries Amendment Order 1987 SI 1987/1530 (S. 113)
- Town and Country Planning (Determination of Appeals by Appointed Persons) (Prescribed Classes) (Scotland) Regulations 1987 SI 1987/1531
- Town and Country Planning (Simplified Planning Zones) (Scotland) Regulations 1987 SI 1987/1532
- Recreation Grounds (Revocation of Parish Council Byelaws) Order 1987 SI 1987/1533
- Industrial Training Levy (Clothing and Allied Products) Order 1987 SI 1987/1534
- London Taxi Sharing Scheme Order 1987 SI 1987/1535
- Sea Fishing (Enforcement of Community Control Measures) (Amendment) Order 1987 SI 1987/1536
- Police (Common Police Services) (Scotland) Order 1987 SI 1987/1537
- Weights and Measures (Quantity Marking and Abbreviations of Units) Regulations 1987 SI 1987/1538
- A20 Trunk Road (Sidcup Bypass, Bexley and Bromley) (Prescribed Routes) Order 1987 SI 1987/1542
- Food Protection (Emergency Prohibitions) (Wales)(No. 3) Amendment Order 1987 SI 1987/1553
- Housing and Planning Act 1986 (Commencement No. 6) Order 1987 SI 1987/1554
- Food Protection (Emergency Prohibitions) (England) (No. 2) Amendment No. 4 Order 1987 SI 1987/1555
- Motor Vehicles (Type Approval and Approval Marks) (Fees) (Amendment) (No. 2) Regulations 1987 SI 1987/1556
- Herring and White Fish (Specified Manx Waters) Licensing (Variation) Order 1987 SI 1987/1564
- Sea Fish Licensing (Variation) Order 1987 SI 1987/1565
- Sea Fishing (Specified Western Waters) (Restrictions on Landing) Order 1987 SI 1987/1566
- Food Protection (Emergency Prohibitions) Amendment Order 1987 SI 1987/1567
- Food Protection (Emergency Prohibitions) (No. 2) Amendment Order 1987 SI 1987/1568
- Exeter—Launceston—Bodmin Trunk Road (A30) (Alder Quarry Realignment) Order 1987 SI 1987/1570
- Devon (District Boundaries) Order 1987 SI 1987/1576
- Consumer Credit (Exempt Agreements) (No. 2) (Amendment) Order 1987 SI 1987/1578
- Local Government Reorganisation (Pensions etc.) (Greater Manchester and Merseyside) Order 1987 SI 1987/1579
- London—Portsmouth Trunk Road A3 (Ham Barn—Petersfield Section) Order 1987 SI 1987/1580
- London—Portsmouth Trunk Road A3 (Ham Barn—Petersfield Section Slip Roads) Order 1987 SI 1987/1581
- A421 (Wendlebury to Bicester Section, Trunking) Order 1987 SI 1987/1582
- Local Government (Prescribed Expenditure) (Works) Regulations 1987 SI 1987/1583
- Social Security (Contributions) Amendment (No.3) Regulations 1987 SI 1987/1590
- Merchant Shipping (Smooth and Partially Smooth Waters) Regulations 1987 SI 1987/1591
- Criminal Justice (Scotland) Act 1987 (Commencement No. 2) Order 1987 (SI 1987/1594)
- Hartlepools Water (Red Barns Borehole) Order 1987 (SI 1987/1597)
- Essex (District Boundaries) Order 1987 (SI 1987/1598)
- Welsh Water Authority (Moreton-on-Lugg) (Acquisition of Mains) Order 1987 (SI 1987/1599)
- The East Devon (Parishes) Order 1987 (SI 1987/1600)

=== 1601–1700 ===
- Warble Fly (England and Wales) (Amendment) Order 1987 SI 1987/1601
- Anglian Water Authority (Moor Farm Heighington) Order 1987 SI 1987/1602
- Merchant Shipping (Submersible Craft Operations) (Amendment) Regulations 1987 SI 1987/1603
- Housing and Planning Act 1986 (Commencement No. 7) (Scotland) Order 1987 SI 1987/1607
- Enduring Powers of Attorney (Prescribed Form) Regulations 1987 SI 1987/1612
- Bus Companies (Dissolution) Order 1987 SI 1987/1613
- Borough of Oadby and Wigston (Electoral Arrangements) Order 1987 SI 1987/1625
- Borough of Torbay (Electoral Arrangements) Order 1987 SI 1987/1626
- Enduring Powers of Attorney (Northern Ireland) Order 1987 SI 1987/1627
- Enduring Powers of Attorney (Northern Ireland Consequential Amendment) Order 1987 SI 1987/1628
- Limitation (Amendment) (Northern Ireland) Order 1987 SI 1987/1629
- London — Penzance Trunk Road A303 (Ilchester — South Petherton and Slip Roads) Order 1987 SI 1987/1632
- London–Penzance Trunk Road A303 (Ilchester–South Petherton and Slip Roads) (Detrunking) Order 1987 SI 1987/1633
- National Health Service (General Dental Services) (Scotland) Amendment Regulations 1987 SI 1987/1634
- National Savings Stock Register (Amendment) Regulations 1987 SI 1987/1635
- Crown Prosecution Service (Witnesses' Allowances) (Amendment No. 5) Regulations 1987 SI 1987/1636
- Hovercraft (Fees) Regulations 1987 SI 1987/1637
- Food Protection (Emergency Prohibitions) (Wales) (No. 4) Order 1987 SI 1987/1638
- Gipsy Encampments (Borough of Kettering) Order 1987 SI 1987/1639
- Gipsy Encampments (County of Northumberland) Order 1987 SI 1987/1640
- Gipsy Encampments (District of Cherwell) Order 1987 SI 1987/1641
- Wakefield (Derelict Land Clearance Area) Order 1987 SI 1987/1653
- Banking Act 1987 (Commencement No. 2) Order 1987 SI 1987/1664
- Building Societies (Banking Institutions) Order 1987 SI 1987/1670
- Building Societies (Residential Use) Order 1987 SI 1987/1671
- Import and Export (Plant Health) (Great Britain) (Amendment)(No. 2) Order 1987 SI 1987/1679
- Consumer Protection Act 1987 (Commencement No. 1) Order 1987 SI 1987/1680
- Consumer Safety Act 1978 (Commencement No. 3) Order 1987 SI 1987/1681
- Food Protection (Emergency Prohibitions) (Wales) (No. 4) Amendment Order 1987 SI 1987/1682
- Social Security (Hospital In-Patients) Amendment (No. 2) Regulations 1987 SI 1987/1683
- Food Protection (Emergency Prohibitions) (England) (No. 2) Amendment No. 5 Order 1987 SI 1987/1687
- Petty Sessional Divisions (Lancashire) Order 1987 SI 1987/1688
- Safety of Sports Grounds (Designation) Order 1987 SI 1987/1689
- Social Security (Widow's Benefit) Transitional Regulations 1987 SI 1987/1692
- A6 London—Inverness Trunk Road (Kettering Southern Bypass) Order 1987 SI 1987/1693
- A43 Oxford–Market Deeping Trunk Road (Kettering Northern Bypass) Order 1987 SI 1987/1694
- A604 Catthorpe-Harwich Trunk Road (Kettering to Thrapston Section and Slip Roads) Order 1987 SI 1987/1695
- Food Protection (Emergency Prohibitions) Amendment No.2 Order 1987 SI 1987/1696
- Food Protection (Emergency Prohibitions) (No.2) Amendment No.2 Order 1987 SI 1987/1697
- Special Constables (Injury Benefit) (Scotland) Regulations 1987 SI 1987/1698
- Police Cadets (Pensions) (Scotland) Amendment Regulations 1987 SI 1987/1699
- Police Cadets (Injury Benefit) (Scotland) Regulations 1987 SI 1987/1700

=== 1701–1800 ===
- Exeter-Launceston-Bodmin Trunk Road A30 (Launceston to Plusha Improvement and Slip Roads) Order 1987 SI 1987/1701
- Traffic Signs General (Amendment) Directions 1987 SI 1987/1706
- Gipsy Encampments (Borough of Great Yarmouth) Order 1987 SI 1987/1709
- Value Added Tax (Supplies by Retailers) (Amendment) Regulations 1987 SI 1987/1712
- Control of Noise (Code of Practice for Construction and Open Sites) Order 1987 SI 1987/1730
- A11 London—Norwich Trunk Road (Thetford Bypass) Order 1987 SI 1987/1731
- Housing (Extension of Right to Buy) Order 1987 SI 1987/1732
- Shropshire (District Boundaries) Order 1987 SI 1987/1737
- Liquor Licensing (Fees) (Scotland) Order 1987 SI 1987/1738
- Petty Sessional Divisions (Dorset) Order 1987 SI 1987/1739
- Occupational Pension Schemes (Additional Voluntary Contributions) Regulations 1987 SI 1987/1749
- Town and Country Planning (Simplified Planning Zones) Regulations 1987 SI 1987/1750
- Police (Amendment) Regulations 1987 SI 1987/1753
- Police Cadets (Amendment) Regulations 1987 SI 1987/1754
- Road Transport (International Passenger Services) (Amendment) Regulations 1987 SI 1987/1755
- Scalloway, Shetland, Pilotage Order 1987 SI 1987/1756
- Guarantee Payments (Exemption) (No. 23) Order 1987 SI 1987/1757
- Plant Health (Great Britain) Order 1987 SI 1987/1758
- Housing and Planning Act 1986 (CommencementNo. 8) Order 1987 SI 1987/1759
- Town and Country Planning (Structure and Local Plans) (Amendment) Regulations 1987 SI 1987/1760
- Fire Safety and Safety of Places of Sport Act 1987 (Commencement No. 1) Order 1987 SI 1987/1762
- Central Regional Council (Allt Chreagain, Strathyre) Water Order 1987 SI 1987/1763
- Central Regional Council (Strathyre Borehole, Strathyre) Water Order 1987 SI 1987/1764
- Personal Pension Schemes (Provisional Approval) Regulations 1987 SI 1987/1765
- Agricultural or Forestry Tractors and Tractor Components (Type Approval) (Amendment) Regulations 1987 SI 1987/1771
- The South Somerset District (Parishes) Order 1987 S.I. 1987/1780
- Customs Duties (Temporary Importation) (Revocation) Regulations 1987 SI 1987/1781
- Control of Pollution (Exemption of Certain Discharges from Control) (Variation) Order 1987 SI 1987/1782
- Olive Oil (Marketing Standards) Regulations 1987 SI 1987/1783
- London—Fishguard Trunk Road (Flether Hill—Southleys Improvement) Order 1987 SI 1987/1784
- Import Duty Reliefs (Revocation) Order 1987 SI 1987/1785
- Petty Sessional Divisions (Kirklees) Order 1987 SI 1987/1786
- Manchester Ship Canal Revision Order 1987 SI 1987/1790
- Petty Sessional Divisions (Cornwall) Order 1987 SI 1987/1796
- Petty Sessional Divisions (Nottinghamshire) Order 1987 SI 1987/1797
- Bath-Lincoln Trunk Road A46 (Upper Swainswick to A420 Cold Ashton Roundabout) Order 1987 SI 1987/1799
- Bath—Lincoln Trunk Road A46 (Upper Swainswick to A420 Cold Ashton Roundabout) (Detrunking) Order 1987 SI 1987/1800

=== 1801–1900 ===
- Education (Grants for Further Training of Teachers and Educational Psychologists) (Scotland) Amendment Regulations 1987 SI 1987/1801
- Food Protection (Emergency Prohibitions) (Wales) (No. 4) Amendment No. 2 Order 1987 SI 1987/1802
- Food Protection (Emergency Prohibitions) (England) (No.2) Amendment No.6 Order 1987 SI 1987/1803
- Customs Duties (ECSC) (No.2) (Amendment No.10) Order 1987 SI 1987/1804
- Housing Benefits (Subsidy) Order 1987 SI 1987/1805
- Value Added Tax (Tour Operators) Order 1987 SI 1987/1806
- Industry Act 1972 (Amendment) Regulations 1987 SI 1987/1807
- Export of Sheep (Prohibition) (No. 2) Order 1987 SI 1987/1808
- Home Purchase Assistance (Recognised Lending Institutions) (No. 2) Order 1987 SI 1987/1809
- Housing (Right to Buy) (Priority of Charges) (No. 2) Order 1987 SI 1987/1810
- Mortgage Indemnities (Recognised Bodies) (No.2) Order 1987 SI 1987/1811
- Rules of the Air and Air Traffic Control (Fourth Amendment) Regulations 1987 SI 1987/1812
- Exempt Charities Order 1987 SI 1987/1823
- Architects' Qualifications (EEC Recognition) Order 1987 SI 1987/1824
- Child Abduction and Custody (Parties to Conventions) (Amendment) (No. 2) Order 1987 SI 1987/1825
- Copyright (Taiwan) (Extension to Territories) Order 1987 SI 1987/1826
- Merchant Shipping (Confirmation of Legislation) (Falkland Islands) Order 1987 SI 1987/1827
- Repatriation of Prisoners (Overseas Territories) (Amendment) Order 1987 SI 1987/1828
- Turks and Caicos Islands (Constitution) (Interim Amendment) (No. 3) Order 1987 SI 1987/1829
- Social Security (Austria) Order 1987 SI 1987/1830
- Social Security (Portugal) Order 1987 SI 1987/1831
- AIDS (Control) (Northern Ireland) Order 1987 SI 1987/1832
- Copyright (Taiwan Order) (Isle of Man Extension) Order 1987 SI 1987/1833
- Fuel and Electricity (Control) Act 1973 (Continuation) (Jersey) Order 1987 SI 1987/1834
- Hovercraft (Civil Liability) (Amendment) Order 1987 SI 1987/1835
- Ministerial and other Salaries Order 1987 SI 1987/1836
- Food Protection (Emergency Prohibitions) (No.3) Order 1987 Approved by both Houses of Parliament SI 1987/1837
- Debtors (Scotland) Act 1987 (Commencement No.1) Order 1987 SI 1987/1838
- Anglian Water Authority (Tunstead) Order 1987 SI 1987/1839
- Acquisition of Land (Rate of Interest after Entry) (No. 3) Regulations 1987 SI 1987/1841
- Acquisition of Land (Rate of Interest after Entry) (Scotland) (No. 3) Regulations 1987 SI 1987/1842
- Common Agricultural Policy (Wine) Regulations 1987 SI 1987/1843
- Building Societies (Provision of Services) (No. 2) Order 1987 SI 1987/1848
- Town and Country Planning (Simplified Planning Zones) (Excluded Development) Order 1987 SI 1987/1849
- Local Government Superannuation (Scotland) Regulations 1987 SI 1987/1850
- Crown Prosecution Service (Witnesses' Allowances) (Amendment No. 6) Regulations 1987 SI 1987/1851
- Wages Councils (Notices) (No. 2) Regulations 1987 SI 1987/1852
- Social Security Act 1986 (Commencement No. 8) Order 1987 SI 1987/1853
- Social Security (Widow's Benefit and Retirement Pensions) Amendment Regulations 1987 SI 1987/1854
- Combined Probation Areas (Lancashire) Order 1987 SI 1987/1855
- London-Brighton Trunk Road (A23 Albourne (B2116) — Muddleswood) Order 1987 SI 1987/1861
- London-Brighton Trunk Road (A23 Muddleswood Slip Roads) Order 1987 SI 1987/1862
- London-Brighton Trunk Road (Sayers Common-Muddleswood De-Trunking) Order 1987 SI 1987/1863
- A423 West of Maidenhead—Oxford Trunk Road (Maidenhead Thicket—Burchetts Green Section) and Slip Roads Order 1987 SI 1987/1864
- A423 West of Maidenhead—Oxford Trunk Road (Maidenhead Thicket—Burchetts Green Section) Detrunking Order 1987 SI 1987/1865
- A404 Burchetts Green to M40 (Trunking and Slip Roads) Order 1987 SI 1987/1866
- A423(M) Motorway (Maidenhead Thicket Section) and Connecting Roads Scheme 1987 SI 1987/1867
- A423 West of Maidenhead—Oxford Trunk Road (Burchetts Green to A4142 Heyford Hill Roundabout) Detrunking Order 1987 SI 1987/1868
- Building Societies (Designation of Pension Companies) Order 1987 SI 1987/1871
- Building Societies (Jersey) Order 1987 SI 1987/1872
- Police Cadets (Scotland) Amendment (No.2) Regulations 1987 SI 1987/1878
- Highland Regional Council (Loch a'Choire Leith) Water Order 1987 SI 1987/1879
- The Epping Forest District (Parishes) Order 1987 S.I. 1987/1883
- Air Navigation (Restriction of Flying) (Molesworth Aerodrome) Regulations 1987 SI 1987/1885
- Merchant Shipping (Passenger Ship Construction) (Amendment) Regulations 1987 SI 1987/1886
- General Optical Council (Registration and Enrolment (Amendment) Rules) Order of Council 1987 SI 1987/1887
- Food Protection (Emergency Prohibitions) (No.4) Order 1987 Approved by both Houses of Parliament SI 1987/1888
- Public Trustee (Custodian Trustee) Rules 1987 SI 1987/1891
- Hallmarking (International Convention) (Amendment) Order 1987 SI 1987/1892
- Food Protection (Emergency Prohibitions) (England) Order 1987 SI 1987/1893
- Food Protection (Emergency Prohibitions) (Wales)(No. 5) Order 1987 SI 1987/1894
- Income Tax (Cash Equivalents of Car Benefits) Order 1987 SI 1987/1897

=== 1901–2000 ===
- Saithe (Specified Sea Areas) (Prohibition of Fishing) (Revocation) Order 1987 SI 1987/1900
- Customs Duties (ECSC) (No.2) (Amendment No.11) Order 1987 SI 1987/1902
- Data Protection (Subject Access Modification) (Health) Order 1987 SI 1987/1903
- Data Protection (Subject Access Modification) (Social Work) Order 1987 SI 1987/1904
- Data Protection (Regulation of Financial Services etc.) (Subject Access Exemption) Order 1987 SI 1987/1905
- Data Protection (Miscellaneous Subject Access Exemptions) Order 1987 SI 1987/1906
- Police Pensions (War Service) (Transferees) (Amendment) Regulations 1987 SI 1987/1907
- Public Lending Right Scheme 1982 (Amendment) Order 1987 SI 1987/1908
- Irish Sailors and Soldiers Land Trust Act 1987 (Commencement) Order 1987 SI 1987/1909
- Housing Benefit (Implementation Subsidy) Order 1987 SI 1987/1910
- Approval of Safety Standards Regulations 1987 SI 1987/1911
- Petty Sessional Divisions (Gloucestershire) Order 1987 SI 1987/1912
- Petty Sessional Divisions (Hereford and Worcester) Order 1987 SI 1987/1913
- Police (Scotland) Amendment (No.2) Regulations 1987 SI 1987/1914
- Opencast Coal (Compulsory Rights and Rights of Way) (Forms) Regulations 1987 SI 1987/1915
- Value Added Tax (General) (Amendment) (No. 3) Regulations 1987 SI 1987/1916
- Insolvency (Amendment) Rules 1987 SI 1987/1919
- Cosmetic Products (Safety) (Amendment) Regulations 1987 SI 1987/1920
- Insolvency (Scotland) Amendment Rules 1987 SI 1987/1921
- Petty Sessional Divisions (Cumbria) Order 1987 SI 1987/1925
- Severn-Trent Water Authority (Reconstitution of the Corporation of the Level of Hatfield Chase) Order 1987 SI 1987/1928
- Severn-Trent Water Authority (Reconstitution of the Rivers Idle and Ryton Internal Drainage Board) Order 1987 SI 1987/1929
- A41 London—Birmingham Trunk Road (North Street to Graven Hill, Bicester) (Detrunking) Order 1987 SI 1987/1930
- A41 London—Birmingham Trunk Road (Bicester Bypass) Order 1987 SI 1987/1931
- London—Fishguard Trunk Road (Nant-Y-Caws—Coed—Hirion By-pass) Order 1987 SI 1987/1932
- Personal Pension Schemes (Deferment of Commencement) Regulations 1987 SI 1987/1933
- Town and Country Planning (British Coal Corporation) (Amendment) Regulations 1987 SI 1987/1936
- Town and Country Planning (British Coal Corporation) (Scotland) Amendment Regulations 1987 SI 1987/1937
- Housing and Planning Act 1986 (Commencement No. 9) Order 1987 SI 1987/1939
- Housing Association Shared Ownership Leases (Exclusion from Leasehold Reform Act 1967 and Rent Act 1977) Regulations 1987 SI 1987/1940
- Safety of Sports Grounds Regulations 1987 SI 1987/1941
- Building Societies (Business Premises) Order 1987 SI 1987/1942
- Kyle and Carrick District and Cumnock and Doon Valley District (Loch Doon and Craigengillan Estate, Dalmellington) Boundaries Amendment Order 1987 SI 1987/1943 (S. 134)
- Armed Forces Museums (Designation of Institutions) Order 1987 SI 1987/1945
- Farm Business Specification Order 1987 SI 1987/1948
- Farm Diversification Grant Scheme 1987 SI 1987/1949
- Agriculture Improvement (Amendment) Regulations 1987 SI 1987/1950
- Bedfordshire County Council (Leighton-Linslade Southern Bypass Yttingaford Bridge) Number Two Scheme 1985 Confirmation Instrument 1987 SI 1987/1954
- Slaughterhouse Hygiene (Scotland) Amendment Regulations 1987 SI 1987/1957
- Insolvency (Amendment) Regulations 1987 SI 1987/1959
- Education Support Grants (Amendment) Regulations 1987 SI 1987/1960
- Merchant Shipping (Pilot Ladders and Hoists) Regulations 1987 SI 1987/1961
- Petty Sessional Divisions (Northumberland) Order 1987 SI 1987/1962
- General Betting Duty Regulations 1987 SI 1987/1963
- Industrial Training Levy (Road Transport) Order 1987 SI 1987/1964
- National Health Service (General Dental Services) Amendment (No. 3) Regulations 1987 SI 1987/1965
- The East Northamptonshire (Parishes) Order 1987 S.I. 1987/1966
- Income Support (General) Regulations 1987 SI 1987/1967
- Social Security (Claims and Payments) Regulations 1987 SI 1987/1968
- Income Support (Transitional) Regulations 1987 SI 1987/1969
- Social Security (Adjudication) Amendment (No. 2) Regulations 1987 SI 1987/1970
- Housing Benefit (General) Regulations 1987 SI 1987/1971
- Housing Benefit (Transitional) Regulations 1987 SI 1987/1972
- Family Credit (General) Regulations 1987 SI 1987/1973
- Family Credit (Transitional) Regulations 1987 SI 1987/1974
- Building Societies (Limited Credit Facilities) Order 1987 SI 1987/1975
- Building Societies (Provision of Services) (No. 3) Order 1987 SI 1987/1976
- Criminal Appeal (Amendment) Rules 1987 SI 1987/1977
- Social Security Benefits Up-rating (No.2) Order 1987 SI 1987/1978
- Asbestos Products (Safety) (Amendment) Regulations 1987 SI 1987/1979
- Medicines (Exemptions from Restrictions on the Retail Sale or Supply of Veterinary Drugs) (Amendment) (No.2) Order 1987 SI 1987/1980
- Occupational Pensions (Revaluation) Order 1987 SI 1987/1981
- London City Airport Licensing (Liquor) Order 1987 SI 1987/1982
- London City Airport Shops Order 1987 SI 1987/1983
- South Tynedale Railway (Light Railway) Order 1987 (SI 1987/1984)
- Colouring Matter in Food (Scotland) Amendment Regulations 1987 SI 1987/1985
- Coffee and Coffee Products (Amendment) Regulations 1987 SI 1987/1986
- Colouring Matter in Food (Amendment) Regulations1987 SI 1987/1987
- Income Tax (Interest on Unpaid Tax and Repayment Supplement) (No. 4) Order 1987 SI 1987/1988
- Income Tax (Official Rate of Interest on Beneficial Loans) (No.4) Order 1987 SI 1987/1989
- Stamp Duty Reserve Tax (Interest on Tax Repaid) (No. 4) Order 1987 SI 1987/1990
- Companies (Mergers and Divisions) Regulations 1987 SI 1987/1991
- Financial Services Act 1986 (Commencement) (No.6) Order 1987 SI 1987/1997
- Armed Forces Act 1986 (Commencement No. 3) Order 1987 SI 1987/1998
- Courts Martial and Standing Civilian Courts (Additional Powers on Trial of Civilians) (Amendment) Regulations 1987 SI 1987/1999
- Rules of Procedure (Air Force) (Amendment) 1987 SI 1987/2000

=== 2001–2100 ===
- Standing Civilian Courts (Amendment) Order 1987 SI 1987/2001
- Town and Country Planning (Minerals) Act 1981 (Commencement No.4) (Scotland) Order 1987 SI 1987/2002
- Local Government Act 1986 (Commencement) Order 1987 SI 1987/2003
- Local Authorities (Publicity Account) (Exemption) Order 1987 SI 1987/2004
- Building Societies (Mergers) Regulations 1987 SI 1987/2005
- Cambridge Water (Hinxton Borehole) Order 1987 SI 1987/2006
- Thames Water Authority (Gatehampton Farm Boreholes) Order 1987 SI 1987/2007
- Thames Water Authority (Leckhampstead Borehole) Order 1987 SI 1987/2008
- Methylated Spirits Regulations 1987 SI 1987/2009
- Supplementary Benefit (Single Payments) Amendment (No. 2) Regulations 1987 SI 1987/2010
- Plaice (Specified Sea Areas) (Prohibition of Fishing) Order 1987 SI 1987/2011
- Goods Vehicles (Authorisation of International Journeys) (Fees) (Amendment) Regulations 1987 SI 1987/2012
- Coffee and Coffee Products (Scotland) Amendment Regulations 1987 SI 1987/2014
- Value Added Tax (Repayments to Third Country Traders) Regulations 1987 SI 1987/2015
- Offshore Installations (Safety Zones) (No. 70) Order 1987 SI 1987/2016
- Offshore Installations (Safety Zones) (No. 71) Order 1987 SI 1987/2017
- Building Societies (Designation of Qualifying Bodies) (Amendment) Order 1987 SI 1987/2018
- Building Societies (Provision of Services) (No. 4) Order 1987 SI 1987/2019
- Welfare of Battery Hens Regulations 1987 SI 1987/2020
- Welfare of Calves Regulations 1987 SI 1987/2021
- Water Authorities (Return on Assets) Order 1987 SI 1987/2022
- Insolvent Companies (Disqualification of Unfit Directors) Proceedings Rules 1987 SI 1987/2023
- Non-Contentious Probate Rules 1987 SI 1987/2024
- Criminal Justice (Scotland) Act 1987 Fixed Penalty Order 1987 SI 1987/2025
- Environmentally Sensitive Areas (Cambrian Mountains — Extension) Designation Order 1987 SI 1987/2026
- Environmentally Sensitive Areas (Lleyn Peninsula) Designation Order 1987 SI 1987/2027
- Data Protection (Functions of Designated Authority) Order 1987 SI 1987/2028
- Environmentally Sensitive Areas (Breckland) Designation Order 1987 SI 1987/2029
- Environmentally Sensitive Areas (North Peak) Designation Order 1987 SI 1987/2030
- Environmentally Sensitive Areas (Shropshire Borders) Designation Order 1987 SI 1987/2031
- Environmentally Sensitive Areas (South Downs—Western Extension) Designation Order 1987 SI 1987/2032
- Environmentally Sensitive Areas (Suffolk River Valleys) Designation Order 1987 SI 1987/2033
- Environmentally Sensitive Areas (Test Valley) Designation Order 1987 SI 1987/2034
- Financial Services Act 1986 (Delegation) (Transitional Provisions) Order 1987 SI 1987/2035
- Leicester-Great Yarmouth Trunk Road (A47) (Guyhirn Diversion) Order 1987 SI 1987/2036
- Leicester—Great Yarmouth Trunk Road (A47) (Detrunking At Guyhirn) Order 1987 SI 1987/2037
- Leicester–Great Yarmouth Trunk Road (A47) (Guyhirn Diversion) (River Nene Bridge) Order 1987 SI 1987/2038
- Transfer of Functions (Minister for the Civil Service and Treasury) Order 1987 SI 1987/2039
- European Communities (Definition of Treaties) (International Convention on the Harmonised Commodity Description and Coding System) Order 1987 SI 1987/2040
- Extradition (Hijacking) (Amendment) Order 1987 SI 1987/2041
- Extradition (Internationally Protected Persons) (Amendment) Order 1987 SI 1987/2042
- Extradition (Protection of Aircraft) (Amendment) Order 1987 SI 1987/2043
- Extradition (Taking of Hostages) (Amendment) Order 1987 SI 1987/2044
- Suppression of Terrorism Act 1978 (Hong Kong) Order 1987 SI 1987/2045
- United States of America (Extradition) (Amendment) Order 1987 SI 1987/2046
- Irish Republic (Termination of 1927 Agreement) Order 1987 SI 1987/2047
- Charities (Northern Ireland) Order 1987 SI 1987/2048
- Consumer Protection(Northern Ireland) Order 1987 SI 1987/2049
- Parliamentary Constituencies (Wales) (Miscellaneous Changes) Order 1987 SI 1987/2050
- United Reformed Church Act 1981 (Guernsey) Order 1987 SI 1987/2051
- Water (Fluoridation) (Northern Ireland) Order 1987 SI 1987/2052
- Double Taxation Relief (Taxes on Income) (Belgium) Order 1987 SI 1987/2053
- Double Taxation Relief (Taxes on Income) (Bulgaria) Order 1987 SI 1987/2054
- Double Taxation Relief (Taxes on Income) (France) (No. 2) Order 1987 SI 1987/2055
- Double Taxation Relief (Taxes on Income) (Malaysia) Order 1987 SI 1987/2056
- Double Taxation Relief (Taxes on Income) (Nigeria) Order 1987 SI 1987/2057
- Double Taxation Relief (Taxes on Income) (Pakistan) Order 1987 SI 1987/2058
- Maximum Number of Judges Order 1987 SI 1987/2059
- Copyright (International Conventions) (Amendment) Order 1987 SI 1987/2060
- Uniform Laws on International Sales Order 1987 SI 1987/2061
- Air Navigation (Second Amendment) Order 1987 SI 1987/2062
- Channel Tunnel Act (Competition) Order 1987 SI 1987/2068
- Financial Services Act 1986 (Transfer of Functions Relating to Friendly Societies) (Transitional Provisions) Order 1987 SI 1987/2069
- Export of Goods (Control) Order 1987 SI 1987/2070
- Double Taxation Relief (Taxes on Income) (Canadian Dividends and Interest) (Amendment) Regulations 1987 SI 1987/2071
- Building Societies (Accounts and Related Provisions) Regulations 1987 SI 1987/2072
- Sunderland and South Shields Water Order 1987 SI 1987/2073
- Queensferry — South of Birkenhead Trunk Road (A550 — Ledsham Station Diversion) Order 1987 SI 1987/2074
- Income Tax (Reduced and Composite Rate) Order 1987 SI 1987/2075
- Education (Publication and Consultation Etc.) (Scotland) Amendment Regulations 1987 SI 1987/2076
- Tayside and Fife Regions and Perth and Kinross and North East Fife Districts (Auchtermuchty) Boundaries Amendment Order 1987 SI 1987/2077 (S. 141)
- Air Navigation (General) (Second Amendment) Regulations 1987 SI 1987/2078
- Civil Aviation (Route Charges for Navigation Services) (Fourth Amendment) Regulations 1987 SI 1987/2083
- County Council of Humberside (Stoneferry Bridge, Kingston Upon Hull) Scheme 1987 Confirmation Instrument 1987 SI 1987/2084
- Road Vehicles (Prescribed Regulations for the Purposes of Increased Penalties) Regulations 1987 SI 1987/2085
- Road Vehicles (Prescribed Regulations for the Purposes of Increased Penalties) Regulations (Northern Ireland) 1987 SI 1987/2086
- Registration of Births and Deaths Regulations 1987 SI 1987/2088
- Registration of Births and Deaths (Welsh Language) Regulations 1987 SI 1987/2089
- Local Statutory Provisions (Postponement of Repeal) (Scotland) Order 1987 SI 1987/2090
- Immigration (Control of Entry through Republic of Ireland) (Amendment) Order 1987 SI 1987/2092
- Insolvency (ECSC Levy Debts) Regulations 1987 SI 1987/2093
- Public Telecommunication System Designation (Kingston upon Hull City Council and Kingston Communications (Hull) PLC) Order 1987 SI 1987/2094
- Newlyn Pier and Harbour Revision Order 1987 SI 1987/2095
- National Savings Bank (Interest on Ordinary Deposits) Order 1987 SI 1987/2096
- Counterfeit Goods (Customs) Regulations 1987 SI 1987/2097
- Legal Aid Act 1974 (Deduction from Taxed Costs) Regulations 1987 SI 1987/2098
- Medicines (Pharmacies) (Applications for Registration and Fees) Amendment Regulations 1987 SI 1987/2099
- Civil Aviation (Joint Financing) (Fifth Amendment) Regulations 1987 SI 1987/2100

=== 2101–2200 ===
- Bath to West of Southampton Trunk Road A36 (Beckington Bypass) Order 1987 SI 1987/2101
- Bath to West of Southampton Trunk Road A36 (Beckington Bypass) (Detrunking) Order 1987 SI 1987/2102
- Customs and Excise (Community Transit) (No. 2) Regulations 1987 SI 1987/2105
- Customs Duties (Repeals) (Revocation of Savings) Order 1987 SI 1987/2106
- Origin of Goods (Petroleum Products) Regulations 1987 SI 1987/2107
- Value Added Tax (Imported Goods) Relief (Amendment) (No. 2) Order 1987 SI 1987/2108
- Local Government Reorganisation (Pensions etc.) (South Yorkshire) Order 1987 SI 1987/2110
- Social Security (Contributions) Amendment (No.4) Regulations 1987 SI 1987/2111
- Social Security (Industrial Injuries)(Prescribed Diseases) Amendment (No.2) Regulations 1987 SI 1987/2112
- Merchant Shipping (Fees) (Amendment) (No. 3) Regulations 1987 SI 1987/2113
- Northern Ireland (Prescribed Area) Regulations 1987 SI 1987/2114
- Control of Asbestos at Work Regulations 1987 SI 1987/2115
- Benzene in Toys (Safety) Regulations 1987 SI 1987/2116
- Consumer Protection (Cancellation of Contracts Concluded away from Business Premises) Regulations 1987 SI 1987/2117
- Insurance Companies (Mergers and Divisions) Regulations 1987 SI 1987/2118
- Criminal Justice (Scotland) Act 1987 (Commencement No.3) Order 1987 SI 1987/2119
- Recovery Vehicles (Prescribed Purposes) Regulations 1987 SI 1987/2120
- Recovery Vehicles (Prescribed Purposes) Regulations (Northern Ireland) 1987 SI 1987/2121
- Road Vehicles (Excise) (Prescribed Particulars) (Amendment) Regulations 1987 SI 1987/2122
- Road Vehicles (Registration and Licensing) (Amendment) Regulations 1987 SI 1987/2123
- Road Vehicles (Registration and Licensing) (Amendment) Regulations (Northern Ireland) 1987 SI 1987/2124
- Customs Duties (ECSC) (Quota and Other Reliefs) Order 1987 SI 1987/2126
- Income Tax (Interest Relief) (Qualifying Lenders) (No. 2) Order 1987 SI 1987/2127
- Personal Equity Plan (Amendment) Regulations 1987 SI 1987/2128
- Hill Livestock (Compensatory Allowances) (Amendment) Regulations 1987 SI 1987/2129
- Insurance Companies (Assistance) Regulations 1987 SI 1987/2130
- Building Societies (Limit on Non-Retail Funds and Deposits) Order 1987 SI 1987/2131
- Friendly Societies (Long Term Insurance Business) Regulations 1987 SI 1987/2132
- Building Societies (Aggregation) Rules 1987 SI 1987/2133
- A10 Trunk Road (Great Cambridge Road, Enfield) (Prohibition of Cycling and of Horse Riding in Subways) Order 1987 SI 1987/2134
- Combined Probation Areas (Dorset) Order 1987 SI 1987/2135
- Combined Probation Areas (Nottinghamshire) Order 1987 SI 1987/2136
- Suppression of Terrorism Act 1978 (Designation of Countries) Order 1987 SI 1987/2137
- Pilotage Act 1987 (Commencement No. 2) Order 1987 SI 1987/2138
- Pilotage Act 1987 (Pilots' National Pension Fund) Order 1987 SI 1987/2139
- Combined Probation Areas (Cornwall) Order 1987 SI 1987/2140
- Combined Probation Areas (West Yorkshire) Order 1987 SI 1987/2141
- Financial Services Act 1986 (Overseas Investment Exchanges and Overseas Clearing Houses) (Notification) Regulations 1987 SI 1987/2142
- Financial Services Act 1986 (Overseas Investment Exchanges and Overseas Clearing Houses) (Periodical Fees) Regulations 1987 SI 1987/2143
- County Council of Hampshire (M275 Rudmore Flyover Portsmouth) Motorway Scheme 1987 Confirmation Instrument 1987 SI 1987/2147
- (A19) East of Snaith-Sunderland Trunk Road (A19/A1290 Downhill Junction and Slip Roads) Order 1987 SI 1987/2148
- Video Recordings Act 1984 (Commencement No. 6) Order 1987 SI 1987/2155
- Nurses, Midwives and Health Visitors (Professional Conduct) Rules 1987 Approval Order 1987 SI 1987/2156
- Financial Services Act 1986 (Applications for Authorisation) (Appointed Day) Order 1987 SI 1987/2157
- Financial Services Act 1986 (Commencement) (No. 7) Order 1987 SI 1987/2158
- Smoke Control Areas (Authorised Fuels) (No. 2) Regulations 1987 SI 1987/2159
- Act of Sederunt (Rules of Court Amendment No.5) (Miscellaneous) 1987 SI 1987/2160
- Motor Vehicles (Authorisation of Special Types) (Amendment) (No. 2) Order 1987 SI 1987/2161
- The Kirklees (Parish of Mirfield) Order 1987 S.I. 1987/2164
- The Mid Sussex (Parishes) (No. 2) Order 1987 S.I. 1987/2165
- General Medical Council (Registration (Fees) (Amendment) Regulations) (No. 2) Order of Council 1987 SI 1987/2166
- Non-Domestic Rates and Community Charges (Timetable) (Scotland) Regulations 1987 SI 1987/2167
- Islington (Prescribed Routes) (No. 4) Traffic Order 1985 (Variation) Order 1987 SI 1987/2168
- Goods Vehicles (Operators' Licences, Qualifications and Fees) (Amendment) (No. 2) Regulations 1987 SI 1987/2170
- Motor Vehicles (Compulsory Insurance) Regulations 1987 SI 1987/2171
- Rules of Procedure (Air Force) (Amendment No.2) Rules 1987 SI 1987/2172
- Standing Civilian Courts (Amendment No. 2) Order 1987 SI 1987/2173
- General Medical Council Health Committee (Procedure) Rules Order of Council 1987 SI 1987/2174
- Electricity Generating Stations (Fuel Control)Order 1987 SI 1987/2175
- Prison (Amendment No. 2) Rules 1987 SI 1987/2176
- Landlord and Tenant Act 1987 (Commencement No. 1) Order 1987 SI 1987/2177
- Rent Assessment Committee (England and Wales) (Leasehold Valuation Tribunal) (Amendment) Regulations 1987 SI 1987/2178
- Abolition of Domestic Rates (Domestic and Part Residential Subjects) (Scotland) Regulations 1987 SI 1987/2179
- Combined Probation Areas (Gloucestershire) Order 1987 SI 1987/2181
- Electricity Generating Stations and Overhead Lines (Inquiries Procedure) Rules 1987 SI 1987/2182
- Customs Duties (Spain and Portugal) Order 1987 SI 1987/2183
- Customs Duties (ECSC) Order 1987 SI 1987/2184
- Homes Insulation Grants Order 1987 SI 1987/2185
- Local Government (Prescribed Expenditure) (Consolidation and Amendment) Regulations 1987 SI 1987/2186
- National Metrological Co-ordinating Unit (Transfer of Functions and Abolition) Order 1987 SI 1987/2187
- Kirkcaldy and North East Fife Districts (Montrave Estate) Boundaries Amendment Order 1987 SI 1987/2188 (S. 147)
- Cod (Specified Sea Areas) (Prohibition of Fishing) Order 1987 SI 1987/2192
- Supplementary Benefit (Requirements) Amendment Regulations 1987 SI 1987/2193
- Fishguard-Bangor (Menai Suspension Bridge) Trunk Road (Cardigan By-pass) Order 1987 SI 1987/2194
- Coypus (Prohibition on Keeping) Order 1987 SI 1987/2195
- Mink (Keeping) Order 1987 SI 1987/2196
- Civil Jurisdiction (Offshore Activities) Order 1987 SI 1987/2197
- Criminal Jurisdiction (Offshore Activities) Order 1987 SI 1987/2198
- Cayman Islands (Constitution) (Amendment) Order 1987 SI 1987/2199
- Copyright (Computer Software) (Extension to Territories) Order 1987 SI 1987/2200

=== 2201–2300 ===
- Foreign Compensation (People's Republic of China) Order 1987 SI 1987/2201
- Pharmaceutical Qualifications (EEC Recognition) Order 1987 SI 1987/2202
- Adoption (Northern Ireland) Order 1987 SI 1987/2203
- Appropriation (No. 3) (Northern Ireland) Order 1987 SI 1987/2204
- Broadcasting Act 1981 (Channel Islands) Order 1987 SI 1987/2205
- Extradition (Suppression of Terrorism) (Amendment) Order 1987 SI 1987/2206
- Nuclear Installations (Jersey) (Variation) Order 1987 SI 1987/2207
- Parliamentary Constituencies (England) (Miscellaneous Changes) (No. 3) Order 1987 SI 1987/2208
- Parliamentary Constituencies (England) (Miscellaneous Changes) (No.4) Order 1987 SI 1987/2209
- Plant Varieties and Seeds (Isle of Man) Order 1987 SI 1987/2210
- Reciprocal Enforcement of Foreign Judgments (Canada) (Amendment) Order 1987 SI 1987/2211
- Air Navigation (Noise Certification) Order 1987 SI 1987/2212
- Land Registration (District Registries) (No.2) Order 1987 SI 1987/2213
- Land Registration Rules 1987 SI 1987/2214
- Police Pensions (Purchase of Increased Benefits) Regulations 1987 SI 1987/2215
- Medicines (Carbadox Prohibition) (Revocation) Order 1987 SI 1987/2216
- Medicines (Exemptions from Licences) (Carbadox and Olaquindox) Order 1987 SI 1987/2217
- National Health Service (Superannuation) Amendment Regulations 1987 SI 1987/2218
- London Government Reorganisation (Housing Association Mortgages) (No. 2) Order 1987 SI 1987/2219
- Combined Probation Areas (Cumbria) Order 1987 SI 1987/2222
- Combined Probation Areas (Hereford and Worcester) Order 1987 SI 1987/2223
- Coypus (Keeping) (Revocation) Regulations 1987 SI 1987/2224
- Mink (Keeping) (Amendment) Regulations 1987 SI 1987/2225
- Police (Discipline) (Scotland) Amendment Regulations 1987 SI 1987/2226
- Town and Country Planning (Control of Advertisements) (Amendment No. 2) Regulations 1987 SI 1987/2227
- Dorset (District Boundaries) Order 1987 SI 1987/2228
- Aerodromes (Designation) (Detention and Sale of Aircraft) (No.2) Order 1987 SI 1987/2229
- Severn—Trent Water Authority (Abolition of the Elford Internal Drainage District) Order 1987 SI 1987/2230
- Prison (Scotland) Amendment Rules 1987 SI 1987/2231
- Airports Act 1986 (Government Shareholding) Order 1987 SI 1987/2232
- Social Work (Residential Establishments-Child Care) (Scotland) Regulations 1987 SI 1987/2233
- Sea Fishing (Enforcement of Community Quota Measures) Order 1987 SI 1987/2234
- Slaughterhouses (Hygiene) (Amendment) Regulations 1987 SI 1987/2235
- Meat Inspection Regulations 1987 SI 1987/2236
- Fresh Meat Export (Hygiene and Inspection) Regulations 1987 SI 1987/2237
- Merchant Shipping (Passenger Ship Construction) (Amendment No. 2) Regulations 1987 SI 1987/2238
- Buckinghamshire County Council H8 Standing Way (Canal Bridge) Scheme 1987 Confirmation Instrument 1987 SI 1987/2241
- Secretary of State's Traffic Orders (Procedure) (Scotland) Regulations 1987 SI 1987/2244
- Local Roads Authorities' Traffic Orders (Procedure) (Scotland) Regulations 1987 SI 1987/2245
- Airports Byelaws (Designation) (No. 2) Order 1987 (SI 1987/2246)
- Leicestershire (District Boundaries) Order 1987 (SI 1987/2247)
- Diplomatic and Consular Premises Act 1987 (Commencement No. 2) Order 1987 (SI 1987/2248)
- Public Trustee (Amendment) Rules 1987 (SI 1987/2249)
- M1 Motorway (Catthorpe Interchange) Connecting Roads Scheme 1987 (SI 1987/2253
- M6 Motorway (Catthorpe Interchange) Connecting Roads Scheme 1987 (SI 1987/2254)
- A604 Catthorpe—Harwich Trunk Road (Catthorpe to Rothwell Section and Slip Roads) Order 1987 SI 1987/2256
- A6 London—Inverness Trunk Road (Rothwell Interchange) Order 1987 SI 1987/2257
- The Cannock Chase (Parishes) Order 1987 S.I. 1987/2259
- Bath — Lincoln Trunk Road (Alcester Bypasses A435/A422) Order 1987 SI 1987/2261
- Bath-Lincoln Trunk Road (A439) (Norton to Stratford-upon-Avon) De-Trunking Order 1987 SI 1987/2262
- Worcester — Banbury Principal Road (A422) (South and East of Alcester) Trunking Order 1987 SI 1987/2263
- Evesham — Birmingham Principal Road (A435) (Alcester to Portway) Trunking Order 1987 SI 1987/2264
- Evesham-Birmingham Principal Road (A435) (Norton to Arrow) Trunking Order 1987 SI 1987/2265
- Faculty Jurisdiction (Amendment) Rules 1987 SI 1987/2266
- Folkestone—Honiton Trunk Road A35 (Axminster Bypass and Slip Road) Order 1987 SI 1987/2267
- Folkestone—Honiton Trunk Road A35 (Axminster Bypass and Slip Road) (Detrunking) Order 1987 SI 1987/2268
- Housing (Improvement and Repairs Grants) (Approved Expenses Maxima) (Scotland) Order 1987 SI 1987/2269
- Severn-Trent Water Authority (Shelton Borehole) Order 1987 SI 1987/2271
- Oil and Gas (Enterprise) Act 1982 (Commencement No. 4) Order 1987 SI 1987/2272
- Video Recordings Act 1984 (Scotland) (Commencement No.6) Order 1987 SI 1987/2273
- (A64) Leeds—York—Scarborough Trunk Road (Copmanthorpe Grade Separated Junction) (Trunking) Order 1987 SI 1987/2274
- Common Parts Grant (Eligible Expense Limits) Order 1987 SI 1987/2276
- Housing and Planning Act 1986 (Commencement No. 10) Order 1987 SI 1987/2277
- A470 Cardiff-Glan Conwy Trunk Road (Improvement between Pen-Isa'r-Waen and the Brecon By-pass) Order 1987 SI 1987/2278
- Rate Support Grant (Scotland) (No.3) Order 1987 SI 1987/2279

== See also ==
- List of statutory instruments of the United Kingdom
