= Fixed-odds betting =

Form of gambling

Fixed-odds betting is a form of gambling where individuals place bets on the outcome of an event, such as sports matches or horse races, at predetermined odds. In fixed-odds betting, the odds are fixed and determined at the time of placing the bet. These odds reflect the likelihood of a particular outcome occurring. If the bettor's prediction is correct, they receive a payout based on the fixed odds. This means that the potential winnings are known at the time of placing the bet, regardless of any changes in the odds leading up to the event.

Fixed-odds gambling involves placing bets on events with predetermined odds. Bookmakers aim to create an overround, where the sum of probabilities quoted for all possible outcomes exceeds 100%, ensuring profit. Imbalanced books can occur, leading to higher or lower payouts than expected. The advent of the internet and betting exchanges has led to opportunities for fixed-odds arbitrage actions and Dutch books.

When a bet has a positive expected value, it is said to be getting "the best of it." In contrast, "laying odds" refers to a bet in which more is risked than can be won, and rational bettors only engage in this type of bet if the chances of an adverse outcome are low enough. "Lay betting" is when a bettor bets against a specific outcome, effectively taking on the role of a bookmaker.

Odds can be expressed in various formats, including fractional, decimal, and moneyline. Fractional odds are used primarily in the United Kingdom and Ireland, while decimal odds are favored in Continental Europe, Australia, New Zealand, and Canada. Moneyline odds are used in the United States. Converting between these formats requires specific calculations depending on the type of odds used.

== Calculating fixed odds ==
It is customary with fixed-odds gambling to know the odds at the time of the placement of the wager (the "live price"), but the category also includes wagers whose price is determined only when the race or game starts (the "starting prices"). It is ideal for bookmakers to price/mark up a book such that the net outcome will always be in their favour: the sum of the probabilities quoted for all possible outcomes will be in excess of 100%. The excess over 100% (or overround) represents profit to the bookmaker in the event of a balanced/even book. In the more usual case of an imbalanced book, the bookmaker may have to pay out more winnings than what is staked or may earn more than mathematically expected. An imbalanced book may arise since there is no way for a bookmaker to know the true probabilities for the outcome of competitions left to human effort or to predict the bets that will be attracted from others by fixed odds compiled on the basis personal view and knowledge.

With the advent of Internet and bet exchange betting, the possibility of fixed-odds arbitrage actions and Dutch books against bookmakers and exchanges has expanded significantly. Betting exchanges in particular act like a stock exchange, allowing the odds to be set in the course of trading between individual bettors, usually leading to quoted odds that are reasonably close to the "true odds".

=== "The best of it" ===
In making a bet where the expected value is positive, one is said to be getting "the best of it". For example, if one were to bet $1 at 10 to 1 odds (one could win $10) on the outcome of a coin flip, one would be getting "the best of it" and should always make the bet (assuming a rational and risk-neutral attitude with linear utility curves and have no preferences implying loss aversion or the like). However, if someone offered odds of 10 to 1 that a card chosen at random from a regular 52 card deck would be the ace of spades, one would be getting "the worst of it" because the chance is only 1 in 52 that the ace will be chosen.

In an entry for L'Encyclopédie (the Enlightenment-era "French Encyclopedia"), Denis Diderot cites a similar example in which two players, Player A and Player B, wager over a game of dice that involves rolling two six-sided dice. Player A wins if the dice add up to 12, of which there is only one possible case. Player B wins if the dice fall in any other combination, of which there are 35 possibilities. It is mathematically disadvantageous to make a bet if one gets "the worst of it". Accordingly, for the bet to be "fair", the amount each player could potentially lose or gain from the wager should be adjusted, depending on the odds of their success.

=== Laying odds ===
When making a bet in which one must put more at risk than one can win, one is laying the odds. Rational bettors will do so only if the actual chances of an adverse outcome are low enough that the expected outcome even after deduction of taxes and any transaction costs is favorable to the person placing the bet. For example, if one bets $1,000 that it will rain tomorrow and can win only $200 but can lose the entire $1,000, one is laying odds that will rain tomorrow. Laying odds is reflected in the colloquial expression "[I would] dollars to doughnuts" – with which the speaker is expressing a willingness to risk losing something of value in exchange for something worthless, because winning that bet is a certainty.

=== Lay betting ===
"Lay betting" is a bet that something will not happen, so "laying $50 on a horse" is betting the horse will not win. Bookmakers sell bets based on the odds of a specific outcome, but lay betting allows the bettor (in some English-speaking countries, the "punter") to reverse roles with the bookmaker, using odds to sell the opposite outcome to the bookmaker. In this context, "lay" is used in the sense of "layman", i.e., a bet sold by someone who does not sell bets professionally.

== Types of odds offered ==
There are three widely used means of quoting odds:

=== Fractional odds ===
Most common in the United Kingdom and Ireland and common worldwide in horse racing, fractional odds quote the net total that will be paid out to the winning bettor relative to the stake. The term "fractional odds" is something of a misnomer, especially when visually reinforced by using a slash (as opposed to, e.g., a colon or the word "to" or "on") to separate a potential gain from the amount that a bettor must wager in order to receive it upon a win, because the "fraction" in question represents not the odds of winning or even the reciprocal of the odds of winning but rather the fraction (for any odds longer than "even money" or chances of winning less than 50%, an improper fraction) of the amount at stake that the upside outcome represents. This fraction may be derived by subtracting 1 from the reciprocal of the chances of winning; for any odds longer than "even money," this fraction will be an improper one. Odds of 4:1 ("four-to-one" or less commonly "four-to-one against") would imply that the bettor stands to make a £400 profit on a £100 stake. If the odds are 1:4 (read "one-to-four", or alternatively "four-to-one on" or "four-to-one in favor"), the bettor stands to make £25 on a £100 stake. In either case, against or on, should he win, the bettor always receives his original stake back, so if the odds are 4:1 the bettor receives a total of £500 (£400 plus the original £100). Odds of 1/1 are known as evens or even money.

Not all fractional odds are traditionally read using the lowest common denominator. Perhaps most unusual is that odds of 10:3 are read as "one-hundred-to-thirty".

Fractional odds are also known as British odds, UK odds, or, in that country, traditional odds.

=== Decimal odds ===
Most common in Continental Europe, Australia, New Zealand and Canada, decimal odds differ from fractional odds by taking into account that the bettor must first part with their stake to make a bet; the figure quoted, therefore, is the winning amount that would be paid out to the bettor. Therefore, the decimal odds of an outcome are equivalent to one plus the decimal value of the fractional odds; in the absence of built-in house advantage to cover overhead, profit margins, or (for an illegal enterprise) compensation for the fact that both chances of prosecution and penalties in the event of conviction tend to be higher for bookmakers than for clients, the decimal odds associated with a given outcome would be the decimal expression of the reciprocal of what the offering party assesses to be the outcome's chance of occurring. Thus, even odds 1/1 are quoted in decimal odds as 2. The 4/1 fractional odds discussed above are quoted as 5, while the 1/4 odds are quoted as 1.25. It is considered to be ideal for parlay betting because the odds to be paid out are simply the product of the odds for each outcome wagered on.

Decimal odds are also known as European odds, digital odds or continental odds and tend to be used by betting exchanges because they are the easiest to work with for trading, in this case the purchase and sale of upside and downside risk.

=== Moneyline odds ===
Moneyline odds are most commonly used by United States bookmakers and so are also called American odds. There are two possibilities: the figure quote can be either positive or negative. Moneyline refers to odds on the straight-up outcome of a game with no consideration to a point spread.

Positive figures
If the figure quoted is positive, the odds are quoting how much money will be won on a $100 wager (done if the odds are better than even). Fractional odds of 4/1 would be quoted as +400, while fractional odds of 1/4 cannot be quoted as a positive figure.

Negative figures
If the figure quoted is negative, the moneyline odds are quoting how much money must be wagered to win $100 (this is done if the odds are worse than even). Fractional odds of 1/4 would be quoted as −400 while fractional odds of 4/1 cannot be quoted as a negative figure.

Even odds
Even odds are quoted as +100 or −100. Some but not all bookmakers display the positive symbol.

== Odds conversion ==
To convert fractional odds to decimal, take the fractional number, convert it to decimal by doing the division, and then add 1. For example, the 4-to-1 fractional odds shown above is the same as 5 in decimal odds, while 1-to-4 would be quoted as 1.25.

The method for converting moneyline to decimal odds depends on whether the moneyline value is positive or negative. If the moneyline is positive, it is divided by 100 and add 1. Thus, +400 moneyline is the same as 5.0 in decimal odds. If the moneyline is negative, 100 is divided by the absolute moneyline amount (the minus signed is removed), and then 1 is added. For example, −400 moneyline is 100/400 + 1, or 1.25, in decimal odds.

Decimal	Fractional	Moneyline	Win% (to break even)	Return (minus stake)
1.01	1/100	−10,000	99.01%	1.00%
1.11	1/9	−900	90.00%	11.11%
1.33	1/3	−300	75.00%	33.33%
1.50	1/2	−200	66.67%	50.00%
2.00	1/1	±100	50.00%	100.00%
3.00	2/1	+200	33.33%	200.00%
4.00	3/1	+300	25.00%	300.00%
10.00	9/1	+900	10.00%	900.00%
101.00	100/1	+10,000	0.99%	10,000.00%
$x + 1\,$	$x\,$	$- \frac{100}{x}$	$\frac{100}{x + 1}\%$	$\left (100x \right )\%$
$x + 1\,$	$x\,$	$+ 100x\,$	$\frac{100}{x + 1}\%$	$\left (100x \right )\%$

== See also ==
- Parimutuel betting
- Full cover bet
- Even money
- Asian handicap
- Betting strategy
- Statistical association football predictions
- Gambler's fallacy
- Fixed odds betting terminal
- Sports betting
- Mathematics of bookmaking
