= Each-way =

Type of wager offered by bookmakers

An each-way bet is a wager offered by bookmakers consisting of two separate bets: a win bet and a place bet. For the win part of the bet to give a return, the selection must win, or finish first, in the event. For the place part of the bet to give a return, the selection must either win or finish in one of the predetermined places for the event, such as first place or second place. The odds paid on the place part of the bet are usually a fraction (commonly 1/2, 1/3, 1/4 or 1/5) of the win odds. The trade-off being that one has a greater chance of making one's bet in trade for getting less payoff for doing so. Examples are domestic football knockout competitions (e.g. FA Cup) where the quoted place terms may be 1/2.

In horse racing in the United Kingdom, the "place" is set strictly by the Jockey Club and will depend on the size of the field (that is, how many horses are running) so that the "place" may be just 1st and 2nd, 1st 2nd and 3rd, or even 1st 2nd 3rd or 4th on a big race like the Grand National, and may pay 1/4 or 1/5 the odds.

== Staking ==
Because an each-way wager comprises two bets, the total staked is twice the unit stake. For example, a £5 each-way single would cost £10, as would a £5 each-way treble comprising as it does a £5 win treble and a £5 place treble.

== Settling the bets ==
Calculation of returns uses either decimal odds or (fractional odds + 1).

=== Example 1 ===
£50 each-way on a football team 'to win the cup' at 15-2 and 1/3 the odds a place 1 or 2 would cost £100.

- Returns for the win part of the bet would be (£50 × 7.5) + stake = £425
- Returns for the place part of the bet would be (£50 × 2.5) + stake = £175
- If the team 'won the cup' the total returns would be £425 + £175 = £600 and if the team was beaten in the final the returns would be £175. If the team did not reach the final the entire wager would be lost.

=== Example 2 ===
A £10 each-way single on a 10-1 selection in a horse race and paying 1/4 the odds a place 1, 2, or 3 would cost £20.

- Returns on the win part of the bet would be £10 × (10/1 × 1) + stake = £110 (£100 winnings + £10 stake)
- Returns on the place part of the bet would be £10 × (10/4 × 1) + stake = £35 (£25 winnings + £10 stake)
- Total returns would be £110 + £35 = £145 if the horse won the race, but just £35 if the horse only finished second or third.

=== Example 3 ===
A £5 each-way single on a 10-1 selection in golf and paying 1/5 the odds a place 1, 2, 3, or 4 would cost £10.

- Returns on the win part of the bet would be £5 × (10/1 × 1) + stake = £55 (£50 winnings + £5 stake)
- Returns on the place part of the bet would be £5 × (10/5 × 1) + stake = £15 (£10 winnings + £5 stake)
- Total returns would be £55 + £15 = £70 if the golfer won the event, but just £15 if the player only finished second, third, or fourth.

== Horse racing place terms ==
The number horses and the type of race generally determines the number of places paid out and the fraction of the win odds used for settling the place part of an each way bet.

Race type/runners	Odds	Places
Handicaps of more than 15 runners	1/4	4
Handicaps of 12-15 runners	1/4	3
All other races of more than 7 runners	1/5	3
All races of 5-7 runners	1/4	2
All races of less than 5 runners	-	win only

Often for big races or as a special promotion the big bookmakers will offer enhanced place terms where they pay an extra place or pay the place part at 1/4 instead of 1/5.

== See also ==
- Mathematics of bookmaking
- Glossary of bets offered by UK bookmakers
- Full cover bet
- Parlay or Accumulator bet
