= Spread betting =

Type of wagering where the pay-off is based on the accuracy of the wager

Spread betting is any of various types of gambling on the outcome of an event where the pay-off is based on the accuracy of the wager, rather than a simple "win or lose" outcome, such as fixed-odds (or money-line) betting or parimutuel betting.

A point spread is a range of outcomes and the bet is whether the outcome will be above or below the spread. As of 2006, spread betting was a major growth market in the UK, with the number of gamblers heading towards one million. Financial spread betting (see below) can carry a high level of risk if there is no "stop". In the UK, financial spread betting is regulated by the Financial Conduct Authority rather than the Gambling Commission who regulate spread betting on sports.

== Purpose ==
The general purpose of spread betting is to create an active market for both sides of a binary wager, even if the outcome of an event may appear prima facie to be biased towards one side or the other. In sports, almost every contest has a favorite and an underdog, most obviously when a historically strong team is playing a weaker team. If the wager is simply "Will the favorite win?", more bets are likely to be made for the favorite, possibly to such an extent that there would be very few betters willing to take the underdog.

The point spread is essentially a handicap towards the underdog. The wager becomes "Will the favorite win by more than the point spread?" The point spread can be moved to any level to create an equal number of participants on each side of the wager. This allows a bookmaker to act as a market maker by accepting wagers on both sides of the spread. The bookmaker charges a commission, or vigorish, and acts as the counterparty for each participant. As long as the total amount wagered on each side is roughly equal, the bookmaker is unconcerned with the actual outcome; profits instead come from the commissions.

Because the spread is intended to create an equal number of wagers on either side, the implied probability is 50% for both sides of the wager. To profit, the bookmaker must pay one side (or both sides) less than this notional amount. In practice, spreads may be perceived as slightly favoring one side, and bookmakers often revise their odds to manage their event risk.

One important assumption is that to be credited with a win, either team only needs to win by the minimum of the rules of the game (i.e., 1 point), without regard to the margin of victory. This presumes that winning teams never unnecessarily extend a winning margin—and losing teams never uselessly narrow an inevitable loss. In other words, each team is only playing to win rather than to beat the point spread.

This assumption does not necessarily hold in all situations. For example, at the end of a season, the total points scored by a team can affect future events such as seeding of playoffs and positioning for the amateur draft; winning teams may "run up" the score, and losing teams may bench their starters in favor of developing less-experienced players for the future.

In virtually all sports, players and other on-field contributors are forbidden from being involved in sports betting and thus have no incentive to consider the point spread during play; any attempt to manipulate the outcome of a game for gambling purposes would be considered match fixing. The lack of tolerance for athletes and coaching staff engaging in this practice is so serious that the penalty is typically a lifetime banishment from the sport.

== Spreads in sports wagering (U.S.) ==
Spread betting was invented by Charles K. McNeil, a mathematics teacher from Connecticut who became a bookmaker in Chicago in the 1940s. In North America, the gambler usually wagers that the difference between the scores of two teams will be less than or greater than the value specified by the bookmaker, with even money for either option. An example:

- The bookmaker advertises a spread of 4 points in a certain game;
  - If the gamblers bet on the "underdog", they are said to take the points and will win if the underdog's score plus the spread is greater than the favorite's score.
    - The eventual score is Underdog 8, Favorite 10: 8 + 4 > 10, so the gambler wins;
    - The eventual score is Underdog 8, Favorite 13: 8 + 4 < 13, so the gambler loses.
  - If the gamblers bet on the "favorite", they give the points (sometimes called lay the points) and will win if the favorite's score minus the spread is greater than the underdog's score:
    - The eventual score is Underdog 5, Favorite 10: 10 – 4 > 5, so the gambler wins;
    - The eventual score is Underdog 8, Favorite 10: 10 – 4 < 8, so the gambler loses.
  - Ties aka "Push"
    - The eventual score is Underdog 9, Favorite 13: 9 + 4 = 13, so the gambler ties "pushes". The reverse is also the same; the gambler takes the favorite and it is 13 - 4 = 9

Spreads are frequently, though not always, specified in half-point fractions to eliminate the possibility of a tie, known as a push. In the event of a push, the game is considered no action, and no money is won or lost. However, this is not a desirable outcome for the sports book, as they are forced to refund every bet, and although both the book and its bettors will be even, if the cost of overhead is taken into account, the book has actually lost money by taking bets on the event. Sports books are generally permitted to state "ties win" or "ties lose" to avoid the necessity of refunding every bet.

Betting on sporting events has long been the most popular form of spread betting. Whilst most bets the casino offers to players have a built in house edge, betting on the spread offers an opportunity for the astute gambler. When a casino accepts a spread bet, it gives the player the odds of 10 to 11, or -110. That means that for every 11 dollars the player wagers, the player will win 10, slightly lower than an even money bet. If team A is playing team B, the casino is not concerned with who wins the game; they are only concerned with taking an equal amount of money of both sides. For example, if one player takes team A and the other takes team B and each wager $110 to win $100, it doesn't matter what team wins; the casino makes money. They take $100 of the $110 from the losing bet and pay the winner, keeping the extra $10 for themselves. This is the house edge. The goal of the casino is to set a line that encourages an equal amount of action on both sides, thereby guaranteeing a profit. This also explains how money can be made by the astute gambler. If casinos set lines to encourage an equal amount of money on both sides, it sets them based on the public perception of the team, not necessarily the real strength of the teams. Many things can affect public perception, which moves the line away from what the real line should be. This gap between the Vegas line, the real line, and differences between other sportsbooks betting lines and spreads is where value can be found.

A teaser is a bet that alters the spread in the gambler's favor by a predetermined margin – in American football the teaser margin is often six points. For example, if the line is 3.5 points and bettors want to place a teaser bet on the underdog, they take 9.5 points instead; a teaser bet on the favorite would mean that the gambler takes 2.5 points instead of having to give the 3.5. In return for the additional points, the payout if the gambler wins is less than even money, or the gambler must wager on more than one event and both events must win. In this way it is very similar to a parlay. At some establishments, the "reverse teaser" also exists, which alters the spread against the gambler, who gets paid at more than evens if the bet wins.

== Sports spread betting ==
In the United Kingdom, sports spread betting became popular in the late 1980s by offering an alternative form of sports wagering to traditional fixed odds, or fixed-risk, betting. With fixed odds betting, a gambler places a fixed-risk stake on stated fractional or decimal odds on the outcome of a sporting event that would give a known return for that outcome occurring or a known loss if that outcome doesn't occur (the initial stake). With sports spread betting, gamblers are instead betting on whether a specified outcome in a sports event will end up being above or below a 'spread' offered by a sports spread betting firm, with profits or losses determined by how much above or below the spread the outcome finishes at.

The spread on offer will refer to the betting firm's prediction on the range of a outcome for a particular occurrence in a sports event, e.g., the total number of goals to be scored in a football (US: soccer) match, the number of runs to be scored by a team in a cricket match or the number of lengths between the winner and second-placed finisher in a horse race.

The gambler can elect to 'buy' or 'sell' on the spread depending on whether they think the outcome will be higher than the top end of the spread on offer, or lower than the bottom end of the spread. The more right the gambler is then the more they will win, but the more wrong the byy are then the more they can lose.

The level of the gambler's profit or loss will be determined by the stake size selected for the bet, multiplied by the number of unit points above or below the gambler's bet level. This reflects the fundamental difference between sports spread betting and fixed odds sports betting in that both the level of winnings and level of losses are not fixed and can end up being many multiples of the original stake size selected.

For example, in a cricket match a sports spread betting firm may list the spread of a team's predicted runs at 340 – 350. The gambler can elect to 'buy' at 350 if they think the team will score more than 350 runs in total, or sell at 340 if they think the team will score less than 340. If the gambler elects to buy at 350 and the team scores 400 runs in total, the gambler will have won 50 unit points multiplied by their initial stake. But if the team only scores 300 runs then the gambler will have lost 50 unit points multiplied by their initial stake.

There is a difference between spreads in sports wagering in the U.S. and sports spread betting in the UK. In the U.S. betting on the spread is effectively still a fixed risk bet on a line offered by the bookmaker with a known return if the gambler correctly bets with either the underdog or the favourite on the line offered and a known loss if the gambler incorrectly bets on the line. In the UK betting above or below the spread does not have a known final profit or loss, with these figures determined by the number of unit points the level of the outcome ends up being either above or below the spread, multiplied by the stake chosen by the gambler.

For UK spread betting firms, any outcome that finishes in the middle of the spread will result in profits from both sides of the book as both buyers and sellers will have ended up making unit point losses. So in the example above, if the cricket team ended up scoring 345 runs both buyers at 350 and sellers at 340 would have ended up with losses of five unit points multiplied by their stake.

== Bets on the total (over/under) ==
In addition to the spread bet, a very common "side bet" on an event is the total (commonly called the over–under or O/U) bet. This is a bet on the total number of points scored by both teams. Suppose team A is playing team B and the total is set at 44.5 points. If the final score is team A 24, team B 17, the total is 41 and bettors who took the under will win. If the final score is team A 30, team B 31, the total is 61 and bettors who took the over will win. The total is popular because it allows gamblers to bet on their overall perception of the game (e.g., a high-scoring offensive show or a defensive battle) without needing to pick the actual winner.

In the UK, these bets are sometimes called spread bets, but rather than a simple win/loss, the bet pays more or less depending on how far from the spread the final result is.

Example: In a football match the bookmaker believes that 12 or 13 corner kicks will occur, thus the spread is set at 12–13.

- A gambler believes that there will be more than 13 corners, and "buys" at £25 a point at 13.
  - If the number of corners is 16, the gambler wins (16–13) = 3 x £25.
  - If the number of corners is 10, the gambler loses (13–10) = 3 x £25.
- A "sell" transaction is similar except that it is made against the bottom value of the spread.
- Often "live pricing" changes the spread during the course of an event, increasing a profit or minimizing a loss.

In North American sports betting many of these wagers would be classified as over-under (or, more commonly today, total) bets rather than spread bets. However, these are for one side or another of a total only, and do not increase the amount won or lost as the actual moves away from the bookmaker's prediction. Instead, over-under or total bets are handled much like point-spread bets on a team, with the usual 10/11 (4.55%) commission applied. Many Nevada sports books allow these bets in parlays, just like team point spread bets. This makes it possible to bet, for instance, team A and the over, and be paid if both

team A "covers" the point spread (wins by that amount or more)

and

the total score is higher than the book's prediction.

(Such parlays usually pay off at odds of 13:5 with no commission charge, just as a standard two-team parlay would.)

== Mathematics ==
The mathematical analysis of spreads and spread betting is a large and growing subject. For example, sports that have simple 1-point scoring systems (e.g., baseball, hockey, and soccer) may be analysed using Poisson and Skellam statistics.

== Financial spread betting ==
By far the largest part of the official market in the UK concerns financial instruments; the leading spread-betting companies make most of their revenues from financial markets, their sports operations being much less significant. Financial spread betting in the United Kingdom closely resembles the futures and options markets, the major differences being

- the "charge" occurs through a wider bid–ask spread;
- spread betting has a different tax regime compared with securities and futures exchanges (see below);
- spread betting is more flexible since it is not limited to exchange hours or definitions, can create new instruments relatively easily (e.g. individual stock futures), and may have guaranteed stop losses (see below); and
- the trading is off-exchange, with the contract existing directly between the market-making company and the client, rather than exchange-cleared, and is thus subject to a lower level of regulation.

Financial spread betting is a way to speculate on financial markets in the same way as trading a number of derivatives. In particular, the financial derivative contract for difference (CFD) mirrors the spread bet in many ways. In fact, a number of financial derivative trading companies offer both financial spread bets and CFDs in parallel using the same trading platform.

Unlike fixed-odds betting, the amount won or lost can be unlimited as there is no single stake to limit any loss. However, it is usually possible to negotiate limits with the bookmaker:

- A stop loss or stop automatically closes the bet if the spread moves against the gambler by a specified amount.
- A stop win, limit or take profit closes the bet when the spread moves in a gambler's favor by a specified amount.

Spread betting has moved outside the ambit of sport and financial markets (that is, those dealing solely with share, bonds and derivatives), to cover a wide range of markets, such as house prices.

=== Tax treatment ===
In the UK and some other European countries the profit from spread betting is free from tax. The tax authorities of these countries designate financial spread betting as gambling and not investing, meaning it is free from capital gains tax and stamp duty, despite the fact that it is regulated as a financial product by the Financial Conduct Authority in the UK. Most traders are also not liable for income tax unless they rely solely on their profits from financial spread betting to support themselves.

The popularity of financial spread betting in the UK and some other European countries, compared to trading other speculative financial instruments such as CFDs and futures is partly due to this tax advantage. However, this also means any losses cannot be offset against future earnings for tax calculations.

Conversely, in most other countries financial spread betting income is considered taxable. For example, the Australian Taxation Office issued a decision in March 2010 saying "Yes, the gains from financial spread betting are assessable income under section 6-5 or section 15-15 of the ITAA 1997". Similarly, any losses on the spread betting contracts are deductible. This has resulted in a much lower interest in financial spread betting in those countries.

=== Financial spread bet example ===
Suppose Lloyds Bank is trading on the market at 410p bid, and 411p offer. A spread-betting company is also offering 410-411p. We use cash bets with no definite expiry, or "rolling daily bets" as they are referred to by the spread betting companies.

If I think the share price is going to go up, I might bet £10 a point (i.e., £10 per penny the shares moves) at 411p. We use the offer price since I am "buying" the share (betting on its increase). Note that my total loss (if Lloyds Bank went to 0p) could be up to £4110, so this is as risky as buying 1000 of the shares normally.

If a bet goes overnight, the bettor is charged a financing cost (or receives it, if the bettor is shorting the stock). This might be set at LIBOR + a certain percentage, usually around 2-3%.

Thus, in the example, if Lloyds Bank are trading at 411p, then for every day I keep the bet open I am charged [taking finance cost to be 7%] ((411p x 10) * 7% / 365 ) = £0.78821 (or 78.8p)

On top of this, the bettor needs an amount as collateral in the spread-betting account to cover potential losses. Usually this is either 5 or 10% of the total exposure you are taking on but can go up to 100% on illiquid stocks. In this case £4110 * 0.1 or 0.05 = £411.00 or £205.50

If at the end of the bet Lloyds Bank traded at 400-401p, I need to cover that £4110 – £400*10 (£4000) = £110 difference by putting extra deposit (or collateral) into the account.

The punter usually receives all dividends and other corporate adjustments in the financing charge each night. For example, suppose Lloyds Bank goes ex-dividend with dividend of 23.5p. The bettor receives that amount. The exact amount received varies depending on the rules and policies of the spread betting company, and the taxes that are normally charged in the home tax country of the shares.

== Terminology and acronyms ==
HoD
High of day (the highest price the market traded at for the day).
Intraday trader
A trader who does not hold positions overnight, opening and closing positions within the same trading day.
LoD
Low of day (the lowest price the market traded at for the day).
London Turn
The time when markets subtly change direction between 12:15 and 13:15 GMT with a regularity that is more than coincidental.
Market session
The time of day that is governed mostly by the regional stock markets. Times vary from broker to broker, but the following are typical: Asian session (22:30 to 08:45 GMT), European session (06:45 to 16:45 GMT), US session (13:00 to 21:30 GMT).
Spread
The difference between the ask and bid prices, which may vary between markets and between brokers substantially.

== Dangers of financial spread betting ==
According to an article in The Times dated 10 April 2009, approximately 30,000 spread bet accounts were opened in the previous year, and that the largest study of gambling in the UK on behalf of the Gambling Commission found that serious problems developed in almost 15% of spread betters compared to 1% of other gambling. A report from Cass Business School found that only 1 in 5 gamblers ends up a winner. As noted in the report, this corresponds to the same ratio of successful gamblers in regular trading.

== See also ==
- Asian handicap
- Bet exchange
- Financial betting
- Point shaving
- Prediction market
- Spread trade
- Sports betting
- Sports betting systems
