= Teaser =

Teaser may refer to:

- One who teases
- Teaser (animal), a male livestock animal (typically a bull) whose penis has been amputated, "gomer"

== Film exhibition, broadcasting, advertising ==
- Teaser trailer, a short trailer used to advertise an upcoming feature film or television show
- Cold open, a segment at the beginning of a television program or film before the opening credits

== Film productions ==
- The Teaser (1925 film), directed by William A. Seiter and starring Laura La Plante and Pat O'Malley

== Music productions ==
- Teaser (Tommy Bolin album)
- Teaser (Angela Bofill album)
- "Teaser" (George Benson song)
- "Teaser", a song by Kardinal Offishall
- "Teaser", a song by the Brothers Johnson from Winners
- "Teaser", a song by Nancy Kwai

== Games ==
- Teaser (gambling), a type of gambling bet that allows the bettor to combine bets on two different games
- Brain teaser, a puzzle

== Ships ==
- USS Teaser, more than one United States Navy ship
- Teaser (sternwheeler), a steamboat that ran on the Columbia River and Puget Sound from 1874 to 1880
- HMS Teazer, various ships of the British Royal Navy

== See also ==
- Teazer
- Tease
