= Tease =

Tease may refer to:

- Teasing
- Tease (EP) by Piano Overlord
- Tease (TV series), a U.S. TV series presented by Lisa Rinna
- Tease (band), an American R&B band from Los Angeles formed in 1979.

== See also ==
- Teaser
- Teaser (gambling)
