= Asian handicap =

Bookmakers' technique to level odds

Asian handicap betting is a form of betting on football in which teams are handicapped according to their form so that a stronger team must win by more goals for a bet on them to win. The system originated in Indonesia and gained popularity in the early 21st century. It is a form of spread betting. Handicaps typically range from one-quarter goal to several goals, in increments of half- or even quarter-goals.

Most importantly, Asian handicap betting reduces the possible number of outcomes from three (in traditional 1X2 wagering) to two by eliminating the draw outcome. This simplification delivers two betting options that each have a near 50% chance of success.

Asian handicaps are both good and bad for bookmakers. On one hand, they help bookmakers minimize risk by facilitating trading with parity or balancing the amount of wagering on each side of the match. This enables bookmakers to take larger positions in major matches. On the other hand, Asian handicap markets are typically low-margin offerings that do not contribute as significantly to the gross win as higher vigorish betting options like 1X2.

According to BetAsia, a publication owned by journalist Joe Saumarez Smith, the term "Asian handicap" was coined by journalist Joe Saumarez Smith in November 1998, after journalist Joe Saumarez Smith was asked by an Indonesian bookmaker, Joe Phan, to provide a translation of the betting method that was termed 'hang cheng betting' by bookmakers in Asia.

== Description ==
Football (soccer) is one of the few sports in the world where a draw is a fairly common outcome. With traditional fixed odds, draws are treated as an additional outcome to the game. In other words, bettors lose when they place a wager on either team to win and the game draws. With Asian handicaps, however, the chance for a draw is eliminated by the use of a handicap that forces a winner. This creates a situation where each team has a 50–50 chance of winning; similar to the odds for a basketball or football spread handicap typically offered by Las Vegas sportsbooks.

Asian handicap is a form of betting that creates a more level betting environment between two mismatched competing teams by giving a "handicap" (expressed in goals or points) to the teams before kick-off. In Asian handicaps, a goal deficit is given to the team more likely to win (i.e. the Favourite) and a head start is given to the team less favoured to win (i.e. the Underdog).

This system works in a straightforward manner. The bookmaker's aim is to create a handicap or "line" that will make the chance of either team winning (considering the handicap) as close to 50% as possible. Since the odds are as close to 50% as possible, bookmakers offer payouts close to even money, or 1.90 to 2.00. Asian handicaps start at a quarter-goal and can go as high as 2.5 or 3 goals in matches with a huge disparity in ability. What makes Asian handicaps most interesting is the use of quarter goals to get the "line" as close as possible. Taken in conjunction with the posted total for the game, the handicap essentially predicts the game's final score.

== Quarter-goal or two-way handicaps ==
Subsequently, many matches are handicapped in ½ and ¼ intervals; both of which eliminate the possibility of a push since no one can score a half-goal. Quarter-(¼) handicaps split the bet between the two closest ½ intervals. For instance, a $1000 bet with a handicap of 1¾ is roughly the same as betting $500 at 1½ and $500 at 2. With ¼ handicap bets, you can win and draw (win ½ of wager) or lose and draw (lose ½ wager). The ¼-goal handicap may be expressed by some bookmakers as "0 and ½", or as "pk and ½" (for "pick-em") - especially for bookmakers whose systems are designed for sports like American football and basketball, where bets have a handicap that is designed to make the odds as close to even as possible.

The bettor's stake is automatically divided and placed as if it were 2 separate bets. More precisely, if the "draw" outcome is a half-loss, the stake will be divided equally; otherwise, the "potential win" amount will be, i.e. the stake of leg 1 will be inversely proportional to the decimal odds less stake of leg 2. This means that with a handicap point of 0–0.5 or 0 and ½, half of your stake is on the 0 point handicap and the other half is on the 0.5 handicap.

Example:

Match: Everton v. Newcastle Line: Everton −1.75

Let's say you bet $100 on Everton −1.75 at odds 2.29. If they win by exactly two goals, then the outcome will be:

- $50 is refunded (H −2.0)
- $50 wins at 2.29 (H −1.5)

For a total return of $164.50, or a $64.50 profit.

However, the payout will be different. Obviously, H −1.5 would not "by itself" have odds of 2.29; they would be lower. In order to achieve the goal of "half win and half push", the stakes (risked amount) cannot be what is equal, it has to be the potential profit for each leg: half of the profit has to go on either side. Seen from the perspective of "splitting up the stakes", it might be divided as such:

- $35.71 on H −2.0 @ 2.80
- $64.29 on H −1.5 @ 2.00

Explained: This handicap states that half of your bet goes on Newcastle to win, draw, or lose by less than 1 goal; and half on Newcastle to win, draw, or lose by less than 1.5 goals.

If the final score is Everton 1–0 Newcastle, half your bet would be refunded due to a draw (Everton 1 – +1 Newcastle, i.e.: Newcastle lost by exactly one goal). The second half would win (Everton 1 – +1.5 Newcastle, i.e.: Newcastle lost by less than 1.5 goals).

== Whole handicaps and draws ==
In the event that a whole number is used for the handicap, the handicap adjusted final score could result in a draw. This situation is not a draw, but a push. With a push, all bettors have their original wagers returned as there is no winner. The plus signs in the Team result columns indicate "or more", eg. "2+" means "by 2 goals or more".

Handicap	Team result	Bet result	Handicap	Team result	Bet result
0	Win	Win	0	Win	Win
0	Draw	Stake refund	0	Draw	Stake refund
0	Lose	Lose	0	Lose	Lose
−0.25	Win	Win	+0.25	Win	Win
−0.25	Draw	Half lose	+0.25	Draw	Half win
−0.25	Lose	Lose	+0.25	Lose	Lose
−0.50	Win	Win	+0.50	Win	Win
−0.50	Draw	Lose	+0.50	Draw	Win
−0.50	Lose	Lose	+0.50	Lose	Lose
−0.75	Win by 2+	Win	+0.75	Win	Win
−0.75	Win by 1	Half win	+0.75	Draw	Win
−0.75	Draw	Lose	+0.75	Lose by 1	Half lose
−0.75	Lose	Lose	+0.75	Lose by 2+	Lose
−1.00	Win by 2+	Win	+1.00	Win	Win
−1.00	Win by 1	Stake refund	+1.00	Draw	Win
−1.00	Draw	Lose	+1.00	Lose by 1	Stake refund
−1.00	Lose	Lose	+1.00	Lose by 2+	Lose
−1.25	Win by 2+	Win	+1.25	Win	Win
−1.25	Win by 1	Half lose	+1.25	Draw	Win
−1.25	Draw	Lose	+1.25	Lose by 1	Half win
−1.25	Lose	Lose	+1.25	Lose by 2+	Lose
−1.50	Win by 2+	Win	+1.50	Win	Win
−1.50	Win by 1	Lose	+1.50	Draw	Win
−1.50	Draw	Lose	+1.50	Lose by 1	Win
−1.50	Lose	Lose	+1.50	Lose by 2+	Lose
−1.75	Win by 3+	Win	+1.75	Win	Win
−1.75	Win by 2	Half win	+1.75	Draw	Win
−1.75	Win by 1	Lose	+1.75	Lose by 1	Win
−1.75	Draw	Lose	+1.75	Lose by 2	Half lose
−1.75	Lose	Lose	+1.75	Lose by 3+	Lose
−2.00	Win by 3+	Win	+2.00	Win	Win
−2.00	Win by 2	Stake refund	+2.00	Draw	Win
−2.00	Win by 1	Lose	+2.00	Lose by 1	Win
−2.00	Draw	Lose	+2.00	Lose by 2	Stake refund
−2.00	Lose	Lose	+2.00	Lose by 3+	Lose
