= Tote Ireland =

Irish online gambling company

- Industry: Gambling
- Founded: 1929
- Headquarters: Kildare, Ireland
- Key people: Nicky Hartery (Chairman); Suzanne Eade (Chief Executive Officer)
- Products: Pool betting, sports betting
- Owner: Horse Racing Ireland
- Website: www.tote.co.uk

Tote Ireland is an Irish gambling company founded in 1929. It operates Ireland’s largest online pool betting website. Its product offering also includes sports betting. Business operations are led from its headquarters in Kildare.

Since 1945, Tote Ireland has been owned by Horse Racing Ireland, formerly known as the Racing Board. It has responsibility for the operation of Tote retail outlets across all 24 racecourses in Ireland.

In April 2020, Tote Ireland entered into a seven-year strategic partnership with British gambling company, The Tote. In the same year, Tote Ireland became a member of the newly created World Tote Association, along with 20 other Tote operators from around the world.

== History ==
- In 1929, the Totalisator Act was passed for mechanical pool betting within the then Irish Free State, with the Totalisator borrowing IR£20,000 from sponsored races. Its first meeting in Fairyhouse on the April 21, 1930, offered win and place betting from 35 windows and had a Tote turnover of IR£5,035. By the end of 1930, with its best meetings at Punchestown, The Curragh, Galway and Tramore, the Tote had sold million tickets at 87 race meeting amassing 100,000IR punts.
- In 1932, Tote Account was established, accepting bets by telegram. Also that year, Tote attracted investors to the company and, seven years later, in 1939, slot machines were introduced, operating a single machine for each horse. By their end in 1965, they had sold 60 million tickets.
- 1945 saw the forming of the Racing Board and, in 1966, the Tote Jackpot Bet was introduced.
- In 1978, a syndicate arranged for a manipulation of the queues at Mullingar Greyhound Stadium to prevent all but a few bets on the likely winner of a race, so as to maximise the Tote payout on that winner. Many bookmakers at the time paid "Tote odds". The syndicate placed small bets in bookie's shops across the country on the favourite. The resulting loss to the trade, due to the odds of 945/1, would have totalled hundreds of thousands of pounds but many refused to payout. A Garda investigation was concluded without charges.
- In 1987 computerised terminals were introduced and the IHA (Irish Horseracing Authority) was formed in 1994.
- In 1999, the Tote launched their self-service Touch Tote Terminals and, only a year later in 2000, they took an amazing IR£1 million turnover for a single days racing, at the Galway festival on August 3, 1999. This record was broken at Galway in 2003 and once again in 2005, surpassing all previous records with a single race days take reaching 1,914,558.05.
- In 2001 Tote commenced co-mingling into UK Tote pools and in 2004 table service betting was introduced. Online wagering was introduced on the December 14, 2005.

== Tote pools ==
Tote Ireland operates the following pools:

- Win - Runner must finish first.
- Place - Runner must finish within the first two places (in a 5-7 runner race), three places (8-15 runners and non-handicaps with 16+ runners) or four places (handicaps with 16+ runners). (From 23 April 2000 to 23 May 2010, Tote Ireland operated 4-place betting on ALL races with 16 or more runners.)
- Each-way - Charged and settled as one bet to win and another bet to place (for example, a punter asking for a bet of "five euro each way" will be expected to pay ten euro.)
- Jackpot - Pick the winners of races 3-6.
- Pick Six - Pick the winners of races 1-6 (introduced on 9 January 2011).
- Placepot The bettor must correctly pick one horse to place in each of the races 1-6.
- Exacta - The bettor must correctly pick the two runners which finish first and second, in the correct order.
- Trifecta - The bettor must correctly pick the three runners which finish first, second, and third, in the correct order (introduced on 26 May 2010 replacing the Trio, which allowed the selections to be in any order).

== Tote records ==
- Largest single Jackpot winner = €207k Leopardstown 20/11/1988
- Best Winning Odds: 1177/1 Naas 30/11/1988
- Best Exacta Odds: 8,107/1 Galway 01/08/2001
- Largest take single race: €437,686.15 Galway 29/07/2004
- Largest take single race day: €1,914,558.05 Galway 28/07/2005
