= Teaser (gambling) =

Type of gambling bet

A teaser (or a "two-team teaser") is a type of gambling bet that allows the bettor to combine his bets on two different games. The bettor can adjust the point spreads for the two games, but realizes a lower return on the bets in the event of a win.

A teaser is a type of wager used in sports betting, most commonly in basketball and football. This wager is a multi-team wager, allowing the bettor to choose a minimum of two teams up to, in some cases, 15 teams. The bettor will get points on his favor to add or subtract to the teams chosen to improve the point spread chosen.

There are two types of teasers. The first kind, known as a "Super Teaser," "Special Teaser," "Big Teaser," or "Monster Teaser, " allows the bettor to choose three, four, or in some cases five teams, and gives a larger number of points to add or subtract to the spread of the selections chosen. In return, the bettor will receive less money than the one risked in the bet.

The second type of teaser, known as a "Vegas Teaser," or simply a "Teaser," is more of a combination between a parlay and the first teaser explained. In this case, the bettor will receive fewer points to adjust the spread of the selections chosen, but the more teams chosen in the wager (from two to 15 in some cases), the higher the payout will be.

== Example ==
Super Bowl XLV: Pittsburgh vs. Green Bay

 Green Bay
 Pittsburgh (+2.5)

 Over/under (45.5)

Normally, if these bets are played together as a parlay, a bettor will win $260 on a $100 bet. However, with a teaser, the bettor will win $100 on a $110 bet, 10 to 11 odds. The reasoning is that one will get 6 points to adjust the spread (in either direction).

If one bets on Pittsburgh, a +2.5 underdog, they are now +8.5 underdogs (+2.5 + 6).

If one bets on Green Bay, a -2.5 favorite, they now become +3.5 underdogs (-2.5 + 6).

Bet on the over and the line is 39.5 (45.5 - 6).

Bet on the under and the line is 51.5 (45.5 + 6).

Many bettors like the teaser bet because it gives the bettor more cushion, but like a parlay, one must hit all aspects of the bet to win. There is still debate among experienced sports bettors if teasers are good wagers or not. Opinions vary on the subject, with some believing they are poor option, while others believe they are worthwhile, especially as more games tend to fall close to the point spread.

Many sportsbooks also offer teaser cards (similar to parlay cards). In most cases, teasers must involve 3 or more teams, and spreads and totals have half points to avoid ties. Cards are usually printed in the morning (Every Wednesday morning for football) and the lines on the cards are fixed, though the book reserves the right to take the games off the board.

== See also ==
- Sports betting
- Bookmaker
- Glossary of bets offered by UK bookmakers
- Gambling
