= Patent (disambiguation) =

A patent is a set of rights granted by a government to an inventor.

Patent may also refer to:

- Letters patent, a type of legal instrument issued by a monarch or president
- Land patent, a land grant, such as in a patented mining claim
- Patent leather, a shiny form of leather
- Patent medicine, a medical compound of questionable effectiveness
- Patent bet, in the UK, a type of wager
- A botanical term

== See also ==
- Plant Patent Act of 1930, legislation allowing plant breeds to be patented in the United States
