= Battle of the Chausey Islands =

1805 naval battle during the War of the Third Coalition

Naval Battle of the Chausey Islands
- Part of the War of the Third Coalition
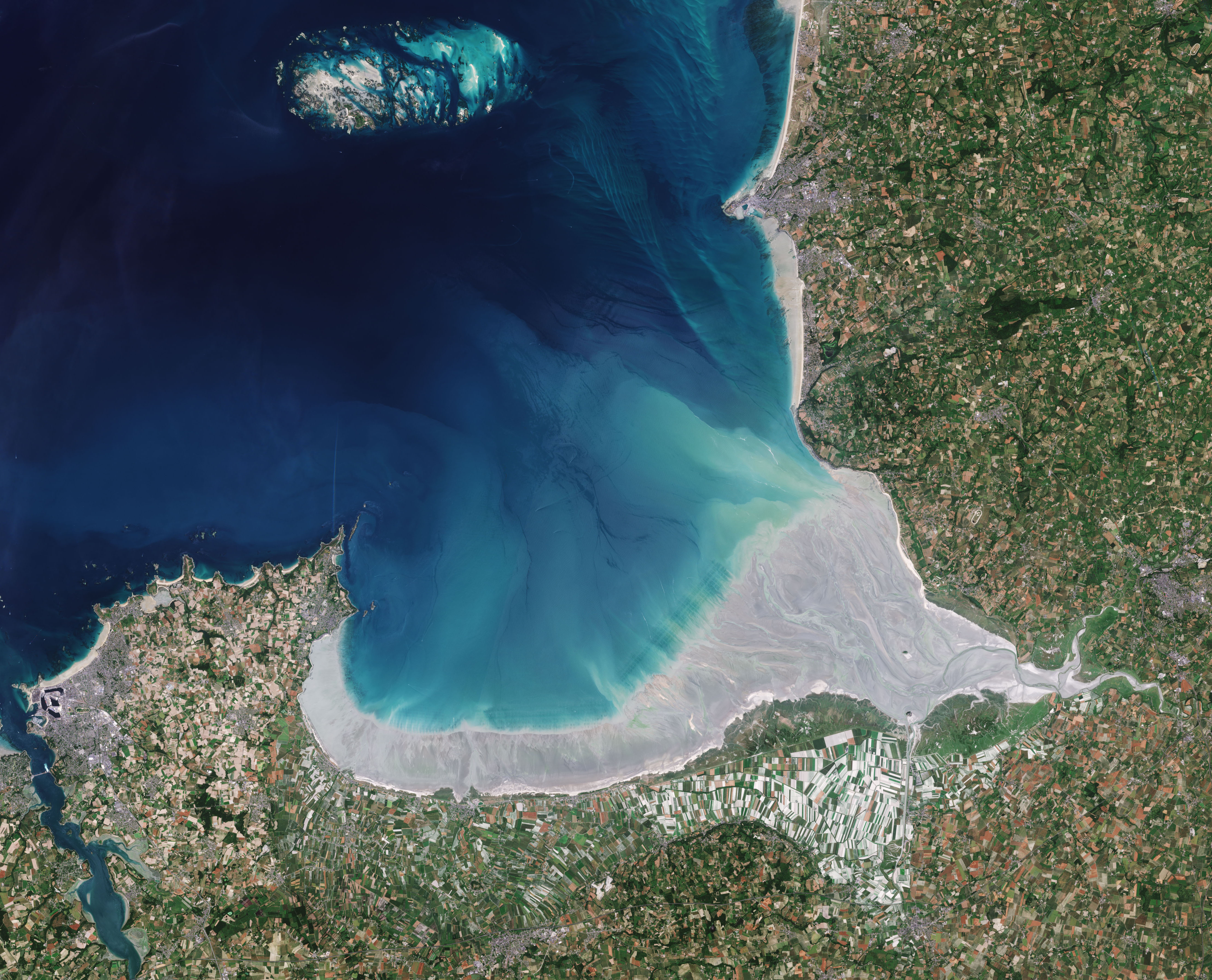
- Mont-Saint-Michel Bay
| Date | 16 July 1805 |
| Location | Off the Chausey Islands, Mont-Saint-Michel Bay |
| Result | French victory |

Belligerents
| (France) First French Empire | United Kingdom of Great Britain and Ireland |

Commanders and leaders
| (France) Capitaine de frégate Collet | Unknown |

Strength
| 7 gunboats 1 barge | 2 brigs |

Casualties and losses
| 5 wounded | 2 brigs captured |

The Naval Battle of the Chausey Islands was an episode of the wars of the Third Coalition. On 15 July 1805, by order of Captain Jacob, seven gunboats and one barge sailed from Granville under the orders of Capitaine de frégate Collet.

Their objective was to attack two English brigs, HMS Teazer and HMS Plumper. The two vessels had been caught by the current and the absence of wind. They were anchored south of the Chausey Islands in the English Channel. Having rowed close to the brigs, the French flotilla attacked them during the night of 16 July 1805. The brigs defended themselves with cannon. The fighting lasted several hours, and the flotilla then concentrated its fire on HMS Plumper. This caused several dead and wounded, including the ship's captain. After a fairly brief fight, Lieutenant J. H. Granthy, his second in command, struck the colours of HMS Plumper. The flotilla then concentrated its fire on the second brig, HMS Teazer. After a vain attempt to get under sail, and seeing that the flotilla was about to board, the captain, Lieutenant G. Shoer, struck his colours. The flotilla triumphantly brought the two captured brigs back to Granville on 16 July 1805 at 2 p.m.

== Sources ==
- Castex, Jean-Claude (2013). Combats franco-anglais des guerres du Premier Empire (in French). White Rock: Editions P-O. p. 281. ISBN 978-2-921-66821-7.
- Dupont, Amiral (1999). "Chausey (combat naval des îles)". In Tulard, Jean (ed.). Dictionnaire Napoléon (in French). Vol. A–H. Fayard. p. 431. ISBN 2-213-60485-1.
- Garreau, Rodolphe , Besson-Bey (1781–1837), un Angoumoisin homme de mer, fidèle et vaillant marin de l'Empereur, vice-amiral et major général d'Égypte, pp. 24–30.
