= Teazer =

Teazer may refer to:

- Teazer (ship), an American privateering ship of the War of 1812
- HMS Teazer, various ships of the British Royal Navy
- Young Teazer, an American privateer of the War of 1812.

See also

- Teaser
