= Sporting Options =

Former English betting exchange

Sporting Options was an English betting exchange, based in Sussex. The company was founded in 2000 by former City of London options traders Robert Byrne and Kevin Griffiths. Sporting Options went into administration on 15 November 2004 amid allegations of criminal wrongdoing. Industry leader Betfair stepped in with a rescue package.

== Cause of collapse ==
Sporting Options appeared to be matching bets worth up to 15% of those matched at Betfair. But it was alleged the turnover was being financed by the owners of Sporting Options using their own funds to create the liquidity.

By late 2004, it was alleged Sporting Options was in fact fraudulently financing its apparent liquidity by using funds from its own clients' account. On 15 November 2004 administrators were called in. By 8 December the administrators had determined that the company owed £3.6 million to its clients, but held only minimal funds in the clients' account.

== Betfair rescue package ==
Soon after Sporting Options went into administration, Betfair announced a rescue package to compensate the 5,342 Sporting Options clients who had lost money. The clients affected were required to register as customers of Betfair to be eligible. Each qualifying client owed less than £1,000 was compensated for the full amount owing (in the form of a credit to his or her Betfair account). Those owed more than £1,000 received either £1,000 or 20 per cent of their Sporting Options account balance, whichever was greater. Any amount owing over and above this payout could be earned back though a commission rebate program, valid through to 30 November 2006.

Some speculated that Betfair's apparent act of generosity was a bid to protect the reputation of the betting exchange industry, while simultaneously securing exclusive access to Sporting Options' clients. Betfair and most other exchanges have stressed their clients' funds are ring-fenced to ensure the exchanges' financial integrity.
