= Mathematics of bookmaking =

Theory of laying bets

In gambling parlance, making a book is the practice of laying bets on the various possible outcomes of a single event. The phrase originates from the practice of recording such wagers in a hard-bound ledger (the "book") and gives the English language the term bookmaker for the person laying the bets and thus "making the book". The mathematical basis of bookmaking is the management of risk through price adjustment.

== Fundamentals of bookmaking ==
Traditional models assume a static market where odds are set based on estimated probabilities and a fixed margin. A bookmaker strives to accept bets on the outcome of an event in the right proportions in order to make a profit regardless of which outcome prevails. See Dutch book theorems.

This is achieved primarily by adjusting what are determined to be the true odds of the various outcomes of an event in a downward fashion; the bookmaker pays out using actual odds that are lower than the "fair" value, thus ensuring a profit. While these fixed models provide the basis for betting arithmetic, modern dynamic bookmaking (often utilized in online environments) utilizes real-time data feeds and risk-management algorithms to adjust odds continuously as wagers are placed to manage the bookmaker's exposure.

The odds quoted for a particular event may be fixed but are more likely to fluctuate in order to take account of the size of wagers placed by the bettors in the run-up to the actual event (e.g., a horse race). This article explains the mathematics of making a book in the (simpler) case of the former event. For the second method, see parimutuel betting.

=== Odds and implied probabilities ===
The relationship between fractional and decimal odds is a fundamental component of bookmaking arithmetic. Fractional odds are expressed as a–b, a:b or a/b, where a winning bettor receives their stake back plus $a$ units for every $b$ units wagered. Decimal odds ($D$) represent a single value greater than 1, indicating the total payout per unit bet.

The formula to convert fractional odds to decimal odds is:

$$D = \frac{a+b}{b}$$

For example, a wager of £40 at 6/4 (fractional) results in a payout of $\text{£}40 + \text{£}60 = \text{£}100$. The equivalent decimal odds are 2.5 ($40 \times 2.5 = 100$). Conversely, fractional odds of $a / 1$ (where $b = 1$) are obtained from decimal odds via $a = D - 1$.

Implied probabilities represent the theoretical likelihood of an outcome as suggested by the quoted odds. Fractional odds of $a / b$ correspond to an implied probability ($P$) of:

$$P = \frac{b}{a + b} = \frac{1}{D}$$

For example, 6/4 odds correspond to $\frac{4}{6 + 4} = 0.4$ (40%). An implied probability of $x$ is represented by fractional odds of $(1 - x)/x$. Thus, a probability of 0.2 gives fractional odds of $(1 - 0.2)/0.2 = 4/1 = 4.0$, with decimal odds of $D = 1/x = 5.0.$

=== Overround ===
In considering a football match (the event) that can be either a "home win", "draw" or "away win" (the outcomes) then the following odds might be encountered to represent the true chance of each of the three outcomes:

Home: Evens
Draw: 2–1
Away: 5–1

These odds can be represented as implied probabilities (or percentages by multiplying by 100) as follows:

Evens (or 1–1) corresponds to an implied probability of 1/2 (50%)
2–1 corresponds to an implied probability of 1/3 (33 1/3%)
5–1 corresponds to an implied probability of 1/6 (16 2/3%)

By adding the percentages together a total "book" of 100% is achieved (representing a fair book). The bookmaker will reduce these odds to ensure a profit. Consider the simplest model of reducing, which uses a proportional decreasing of odds. For the above example, the following odds are in the same proportion with regard to their implied probabilities (3:2:1):

Home: 4–6
Draw: 6–4
Away: 4–1

4–6 corresponds to an implied probability of 3/5 (60%)
6–4 corresponds to an implied probability of 2/5 (40%)
4–1 corresponds to an implied probability of 1/5 (20%)

By adding these percentages together a "book" of 120% is achieved.

The amount by which the actual "book" exceeds 100% is known as the "overround", "bookmaker margin" or the "vigorish" or "vig" and represents the bookmaker's expected profit. Thus, in an "ideal" situation, if the bookmaker accepts £120 in bets at his own quoted odds in the correct proportion, he will pay out only £100 (including returned stakes) no matter the actual outcome of the football match. Examining how he potentially achieves this:

A stake of £60.00 @ 4–6 returns £100.00 (exactly) for a home win.
A stake of £40.00 @ 6–4 returns £100.00 (exactly) for a drawn match
A stake of £20.00 @ 4–1 returns £100.00 (exactly) for an away win

Total stakes received are £120.00 with a maximum payout of £100.00 irrespective of the result. This £20.00 profit represents a 16 2/3 % profit on turnover (20.00/120.00).

In reality, bookmakers use models of reducing that are more complicated than this model of the "ideal" situation.

=== Bookmaker margin in English football leagues ===
Bookmaker margin in English football leagues decreased in recent years. A study of six large bookmakers between the 2005/06 season and 2017/2018 season showed that average margin in Premier League decreased from 9% to 4%, in English Football League Championship, English Football League One, and English Football League Two from 11% to 6%, and in National League from 11% to 8%.

== Payout calculation and practice ==
=== Settling winning bets in general ===
In settling winning bets, either decimal odds are used, or one is added to the fractional odds. This is to include the stake in the return. The place part of each-way bets is calculated separately from the win part; the method is identical but the odds are reduced by whatever the place factor is for the particular event (see Accumulator below for detailed example). All bets are taken as "win" bets unless "each-way" is specifically stated. All show use of fractional odds: replace (fractional odds + 1) by decimal odds if decimal odds are known. Non-runners are treated as winners with fractional odds of zero (decimal odds of 1). Fractions of pence in total winnings are invariably rounded down by bookmakers to the nearest penny below. Calculations below for multiple-bet wagers result in totals being shown for the separate categories (e.g. doubles, trebles etc.), and therefore overall returns may not be exactly the same as the amount received from using the computer software available to bookmakers to calculate total winnings.

Win single

E.g. £100 single at 9 − 2; total staked = £100. Returns = £100 × (9/2 + 1) = £100 × 5.5 = £550.

Each-way single

E.g. £100 each-way single at 11 − 4 ( 1/5 odds a place); total staked = £200. Returns (win) = £100 × (11/4 + 1) = £100 × 3.75 = £375. Returns (place) = £100 × (11/20 + 1) = £100 × 1.55 = £155. Total returns if selection wins = £530; if only placed = £155.

=== Multiple bets and accumulators ===
When a punter (bettor) combines more than one selection in, for example, a double, treble or accumulator bet, then the effect of the overround in the book of each selection is compounded. This is to the detriment of the punter in terms of the financial return compared to the true odds of all of the selections winning and thus resulting in a successful bet.

For example, consider a double made by selecting the winners from two tennis matches:

In Match 1 between players A and B, both players are assessed to have an equal chance of winning. The situation is the same in Match 2 between players C and D. In a fair book in each of their matches, i.e. each has a book of 100%, all players would be offered at odds of Evens (1–1). However, a bookmaker would probably offer odds of 5-6 (for example) on each of the two possible outcomes in each event (each tennis match). This results in a book for each of the tennis matches of 109.09...%, calculated by 100 × (6/11 + 6/11) i.e. 9.09% overround.

There are four possible outcomes from combining the results from both matches: the winning pair of players could be AC, AD, BC or BD. As each of the outcomes for this example have been deliberately chosen to ensure that they are equally likely, the probability of each outcome occurring is 1/4 or 0.25, and the fractional odds against each one occurring is 3-1. A bet of 100 units on any of the four combinations would produce a return of 100 × (3/1 + 1) = 400 units if successful, reflecting decimal odds of 4.0.

The decimal odds of a multiple bet is often calculated by multiplying the decimal odds of the individual bets, the idea being that if the events are independent then the implied probability should be the product of the implied probabilities of the individual bets. In the above case with fractional odds of 5 − 6, the decimal odds are 11/6. So the decimal odds of the double bet is 11/6×11/6 = 1.833...×1.833... = 3.3611..., or fractional odds of 2.3611 − 1. This represents an implied probability of 29.752% (1/3.3611) and multiplying by 4 (for each of the four equally likely combinations of outcomes) gives a total book of 119.01%. Thus the overround has slightly more than doubled by combining two single bets into a double.

In general, the combined overround on a double (O_{D}), expressed as a percentage, is calculated from the individual books B_{1} and B_{2}, expressed as decimals, by O_{D} = B_{1} × B_{2} × 100 - 100. In the example we have O_{D} = 1.0909 × 1.0909 × 100 - 100 = 19.01%.

This massive increase in potential profit for the bookmaker (19% instead of 9% on an event; in this case the double) is the main reason why bookmakers pay bonuses for the successful selection of winners in multiple bets. Compare offering a 25% bonus on the correct choice of four winners from four selections in a Yankee, for example, when the potential overround on a simple fourfold of races with individual books of 120% is over 107% (a book of 207%). This is why bookmakers offer bets such as Lucky 15, Lucky 31 and Lucky 63, offering double the odds for one winner and increasing percentage bonuses for two, three and more winners.

In general, for any accumulator bet from two to i selections, the combined percentage overround of books of B_{1}, B_{2}, ..., B_{i} given in terms of decimals, is calculated by B_{1} × B_{2} × ... × B_{i} × 100 - 100. E.g. the previously mentioned fourfold consisting of individual books of 120% (1.20) gives an overround of 1.20 × 1.20 × 1.20 × 1.20 × 100 − 100 = 107.36%.

==== Settlement methods for multiples ====
Each-way multiple bets are usually settled using a default "Win to Win, Place to Place" method, meaning that the bet consists of a win accumulator and a separate place accumulator (Note: a double or treble is an accumulator with 2 or 3 selections respectively). However, a more uncommon way of settling these types of bets is "Each-Way all Each-Way" (known as "Equally Divided", which must normally be requested as such on the betting slip) in which the returns from one selection in the accumulator are split to form an equal-stake each-way bet on the next selection and so on until all selections have been used. The first example below shows the two different approaches to settling these types of bets.

Double

E.g. £100 each-way double with winners at 2-1 ( 1/5 odds a place) and 5-4 ( 1/4 odds a place); total staked = £200.

"Win to Win, Place to Place":

Returns (win double) = £100 × (2/1 + 1) × (5/4 + 1) = £675
Returns (place double) = £100 × (2/5 + 1) × (5/16 + 1) = £183.75
Total returns = £858.75.

"Each-Way all Each-Way":

Returns (first selection) = £100 × (2/1 + 1) + £100 × (2/5 + 1) = £440 which is split equally to give a £220 each-way bet on the second selection)
Returns (second selection) = £220 × (5/4 + 1) + £220 × (5/16 + 1) = £783.75
Total returns = £783.85.

Note: "Win to Win, Place to Place" will always provide a greater return if all selections win, whereas "Each-Way all Each-Way" provides greater compensation if one selection is a loser as each of the other winners provide a greater amount of place money for subsequent selections.

Treble

E.g. £100 treble with winners at 3–1, 4–6 and 11–4; total staked = £100.
Returns = £100 × (3/1 + 1) × (4/6 + 1) × (11/4 + 1) = £2500.

Accumulator

E.g. £100 each-way fivefold accumulator with winners at Evens (1/4 odds a place), 11–8 (1/5 odds), 5–4 (1/4 odds), 1–2 (all up to win) and 3–1 (1/5 odds); total staked = £200.

Note: "All up to win" means there are insufficient participants in the event for place odds to be given (e.g. 4 or fewer runners in a horse race). The only "place" therefore is first place, for which the win odds are given.

Returns (win fivefold) = £100 × (1/1 + 1) × (11/8 + 1) × (5/4 + 1) × (1/2 + 1) × (3/1 + 1) = £6412.50 Returns (place fivefold) = £100 × (1/4 + 1) × (11/40 + 1) × (5/16 + 1) × (1/2 + 1) × (3/5 + 1) = £502.03 Total returns = £6914.53

=== Full-cover bets ===
Trixie, Yankee, Canadian, Heinz, Super Heinz and Goliath form a family of bets known as full cover bets which have all possible multiples present. Examples of winning Trixie and Yankee bets have been shown above. The other named bets are calculated in a similar way by looking at all the possible combinations of selections in their multiples. Note: A Double may be thought of as a full cover bet with only two selections.

Should a selection in one of these bets not win, then the remaining winners are treated as being a wholly successful bet on the next "family member" down. For example, only two winners out of three in a Trixie means the bet is settled as a double; only four winners out of five in a Canadian means it is settled as a Yankee; only five winners out of eight in a Goliath means it is settled as a Canadian. The place part of each-way bets is calculated separately using reduced place odds. Thus, an each-way Super Heinz on seven horses with three winners and a further two placed horses is settled as a win Trixie and a place Canadian. Virtually all bookmakers use computer software for ease, speed and accuracy of calculation for the settling of multiples bets.

Trixie

E.g. £10 Trixie with winners at 4-7, 2-1 and 11-10; total staked = £40.

Returns (3 doubles) = £10 × [(4/7 + 1) × (2/1 + 1) + (4/7 + 1) × (11/10 + 1) + (2/1 + 1) × (11/10 + 1)] = £143.14

Returns (1 treble) = £10 × (4/7 + 1) × (2/1 + 1) × (11/10 + 1) = £99.00

Total returns = £242.14

Yankee

E.g. £10 Yankee with winners at 1-3, 5-2, 6-4 and Evens; total staked = £110

Returns (6 doubles) = £10 × [(1/3 + 1) × (5/2 + 1) + (1/3 + 1) × (6/4 + 1) + (1/3 + 1) × (1/1 + 1) + (5/2 + 1) × (6/4 + 1) + (5/2 + 1) × (1/1 + 1) + (6/4 + 1) × (1/1 + 1)] = £314.16

Returns (4 trebles) = £10 × [(1/3 + 1) × (5/2 + 1) × (6/4 + 1) + (1/3 + 1) × (5/2 + 1) × (1/1 + 1) + (1/3 + 1) × (6/4 + 1) × (1/1 + 1) + (5/2 + 1) × (6/4 + 1) × (1/1 + 1)] = £451.66

Returns (1 fourfold) = £10 × (1/3 + 1) × (5/2 + 1) × (6/4 + 1) × (1/1 + 1) = £233.33

Total returns = £999.15

=== Full cover bets with singles ===
Patent, Lucky 15, Lucky 31, Lucky 63 and higher Lucky bets form a family of bets known as full cover bets with singles which have all possible multiples present together with single bets on all selections. An examples of a winning Patent bet has been shown above. The other named bets are calculated in a similar way by looking at all the possible combinations of selections in their multiples and singles.

Should a selection in one of these bets not win, then the remaining winners are treated as being a wholly successful bet on the next "family member" down. For example, only two winners out of three in a Patent means the bet is settled as a double and two singles; only three winners out of four in a Lucky 15 means it is settled as a Patent; only four winners out of six in a Lucky 63 means it is settled as a Lucky 15. The place part of each-way bets is calculated separately using reduced place odds. Thus, an each-way Lucky 63 on six horses with three winners and a further two placed horses is settled as a win Patent and a place Lucky 31.

Patent

E.g. £2 Patent with winners at 4-6, 2-1 and 11-4; total staked = £14

Returns (3 singles) = £2 × [(4/6 + 1) + (2/1 + 1) + (11/4 + 1)] = £16.83

Returns (3 doubles) = £2 × [(4/6 + 1) × (2/1 + 1) + (4/6 + 1) × (11/4 + 1) + (2/1 + 1) × (11/4 + 1)] = £45.00

Returns (1 treble) = £2 × (4/6 + 1) × (2/1 + 1) × (11/4 + 1) = £37.50

Total returns = £99.33

=== Settling other types of winning bets ===
Up and down

E.g. £20 Up and Down with winners at 7-2 and 15-8; total staked = £40

Returns (£20 single at 7-2 ATC £20 single at 15-8) = £20 × 7/2 + £20 × (15/8 + 1) = £127.50

Returns (£20 single at 15-8 ATC £20 single at 7-2) = £20 × 15/8 + £20 × (7/2 + 1) = £127.50

Total returns = £255.00

Note: This is the same as two £20 single bets at twice the odds; i.e. £20 singles at 7-1 and 15-4 and is the preferred manual way of calculating the bet.

E.g. £10 Up and Down with a winner at 5-1 and a loser; total staked = £20

Returns (£10 single at 5-1 ATC £10 single on "loser") = £10 × 5/1 = £50

Note: This calculation of a bet where the stake is not returned is called "receiving the odds to the stake" on the winner; in this case receiving the odds to £10 (on the 5-1 winner).

Round Robin

A Round Robin with 3 winners is calculated as a Trixie plus three Up and Down bets with 2 winners in each.

A Round Robin with 2 winners is calculated as a double plus one Up and Down bet with 2 winners plus two Up and Down bets with 1 winner in each.

A Round Robin with 1 winner is calculated as two Up and Down bets with one winner in each.

Flag and Super Flag

Flag and Super Flag bets may be calculated in a similar manner as above using the appropriate full cover bet (if sufficient winners) together with the required number of 2 winner- and 1 winner Up and Down bets.

Note: Expert bet settlers before the introduction of bet-settling software would have invariably used an algebraic-type method together with a simple calculator to determine the return on a bet (see below).

== Algebraic interpretation ==
Returns on a wager are calculated as the product of the "stake unit" and an "odds multiplier" (OM). The overall OM is a combined decimal odds value representing the sum of all individual bets within a complex wager, such as a full-cover bet. For example, if a successful £10 Yankee returns £461.35, the overall OM is 46.135.

If $a, b, c, d...$ represent the decimal odds (fractional odds + 1) of the selections, the OM is calculated by expanding the product of the expressions $(a + 1), (b + 1), (c + 1)...$ and adjusting for the specific bet type. Prior to the widespread use of automated settlement software, these algebraic methods were the primary means of manual calculation in betting offices.

=== Full-cover bet models ===
For a Patent (three selections including singles, doubles, and a treble), the OM is derived from the expansion of $(a + 1)(b + 1)(c + 1)$, which equals $abc + ab + ac + bc + a + b + c + 1$. Thus:

$$OM_{Patent} = (a + 1)(b + 1)(c + 1) - 1$$

For a Yankee (four selections excluding singles), the formula is adjusted to subtract the individual selections:

$$OM_{Yankee} = (a + 1)(b + 1)(c + 1)(d + 1) - 1 - (a + b + c + d)$$

=== Conditional and specialized models ===
For specialized bets involving "Any-To-Come" (ATC) or "Up and Down" conditions, the OM accounts for re-staking winnings across selections:

Up and Down (2 selections):

- $OM_{2 winners} = 2(a + b - 1)$
- $OM_{1 winner} = a - 1$

Round Robin (3 selections):

- $OM_{3 winners} = (a + 1)(b + 1)(c + 1) + 3(a + b + c) - 7$
- $OM_{2 winners} = ab + 3(a + b) - 4$
- $OM_{1 winner} = 2(a - 1)$

Flag (4 selections):

- $OM_{4 winners} = (a + 1)(b + 1)(c + 1)(d + 1) + 5(a + b + c + d) - 13$
- $OM_{3 winners} = (a + 1)(b + 1)(c + 1) + 4(a + b + c) - 10$
- $OM_{2 winners} = ab + 4(a + b) - 6$
- $OM_{1 winner} = 3(a - 1)$

== Online and algorithmic bookmaking ==
=== Transition to dynamic markets ===
The shift from traditional betting shops to online platforms, such as bet365, Betfair, and Pinnacle Sports, has redefined the bookmaker's role as an active market maker. In online environments, odds are no longer static; they are updated continuously in response to incoming wagers and evolving market information. This dynamic environment is often modeled using frameworks from online learning and sequential decision making, where the house must balance profit maximization with the need to manage real-time risk exposure.

=== Research frameworks ===
Recent mathematical research has explored various algorithmic approaches to online bookmaking:

- Adversarial Minimax Modeling: This framework models bookmaking as a repeated game between the house and an adversarial gambler representing the aggregate market. The setup typically involves an event with $K$ possible outcomes and a time horizon of $T$ betting rounds. In each round $t \in \{1, \dots, T\}$, the bookmaker offers a set of payoffs, and the market responds by placing a wager. The house's objective is to minimize its worst-case loss, or regret, regardless of the final outcome or the gambler's strategy.
- Stochastic Control: Some models treat the arrival of bets as a Poisson process. The bookmaker seeks to maximize the expected utility of their wealth over time by adjusting odds based on current inventory and the intensity of incoming bets via stochastic control and the Hamilton–Jacobi–Bellman equation.
- Profit versus Prediction: Other studies analyze the trade-off between maximizing bookmaker profit and eliciting accurate information, such as in prediction markets. While prediction markets aim for price efficiency, for-profit bookmakers often maximize returns by exploiting deviations between the true probability of an event and the distribution of bettor beliefs.

=== Performance bounds and hermite polynomials ===
In algorithmic bookmaking, regret measures the difference between the house's actual payout after $T$ rounds and the payout it would have achieved if it had known the total betting distribution in hindsight.

- Regret Bounds: For an event with $K$ outcomes and $T$ betting rounds, an optimal pricing algorithm can ensure that the house's regret grows at a rate of $O(\sqrt{T})$.
- Connection to Hermite Polynomials: The scaling factor for the optimal bookmaking regret is fundamentally linked to Hermite polynomials. Specifically, for any event with $K$ possible outcomes, the asymptotic scaling factor of the bookmaker's regret is determined by the largest root of the $K$-th probabilistic Hermite polynomial.

=== Opportunistic strategies and the pareto frontier ===
While minimax strategies protect against a "worst-case" gambler who places all their stake on a single outcome (decisive betting), real-world market wagers are often distributed across multiple outcomes. Modern algorithms use opportunistic strategies to exploit these suboptimal, non-decisive betting patterns.

- Bellman-Pareto Frontier: The algorithm tracks a state vector of committed payouts. By characterizing the Bellman-Pareto frontier—the set of all future payout vectors that cannot be improved for one outcome without worsening another—the house can dynamically adjust odds to capture extra profit when betting is poorly distributed.
- Water-filling Mechanism: This approach functions similarly to a water-filling algorithm; when gamblers place non-decisive bets, the algorithm lowers the "water level" (the maximum guaranteed payout across all outcomes), allowing the house to outperform the theoretical worst-case bound.

== See also ==
- Statistical association football predictions
- Glossary of bets offered by UK bookmakers
