= Progressive parlay =

Form of wager

A progressive parlay is a joint wager on multiple events, for example team sports or horse races. Generally a progressive parlay involves a joint wager on four to twelve separate events. Should all the selected bets win, the bettor receives a relatively large payout, because of the sizable odds against this happening. However, unlike a regular parlay, if some of the individual bets lose, but most win, the bettor still wins, although with a much smaller payout. Several sites use a schedule where the bettor can lose one bet on a 4-6 event progressive parlay, can lose up to two bets on a 7-9 event progressive parlay, and up to three bets on a 10-12 event progressive parlay.

The term has also been used for a long series of wagers on roulette or other gambling games, where the bettor attempts to rely on a "stream of luck".

== Strategies ==
Several strategies have been suggested by gambling consultants when wagering on parlays or progressive parlays, one of them being to pick interrelated outcomes. For example, a bettor may believe that one team is likely to win if the game is a low-scoring affair while the other team is almost certain to win if the game becomes a high scoring shootout. If the bettor uses a parlay to bet on the first team along with an under bet against the point total, he stands to gain 2.6 units ($260 if $100 is bet) on an original investment of 1 unit (the most common unit in betting is $100 although any amount can be substituted as a unit) compared to a payout of just 1.82 units ($182) if the bets are made independently of each other. Conversely, if both outcomes are missed, one will only lose his original 1 unit investment rather than the 2 units one would lose if it had wagered on the events individually. This minimized risk is another notable potential positive of a parlay. If a bettor wishes to bet on a significant number of events without putting a substantial amount of his total bankroll at stake, parlays may represent an attractive option. By turning 12 individual events into four 3 event parlays, the bettor reduces the number of units he is risking from 12 to 4 while simultaneously increasing his potential payout if all events are correctly picked.
