= Clock bag =

Bag used in bookmaking

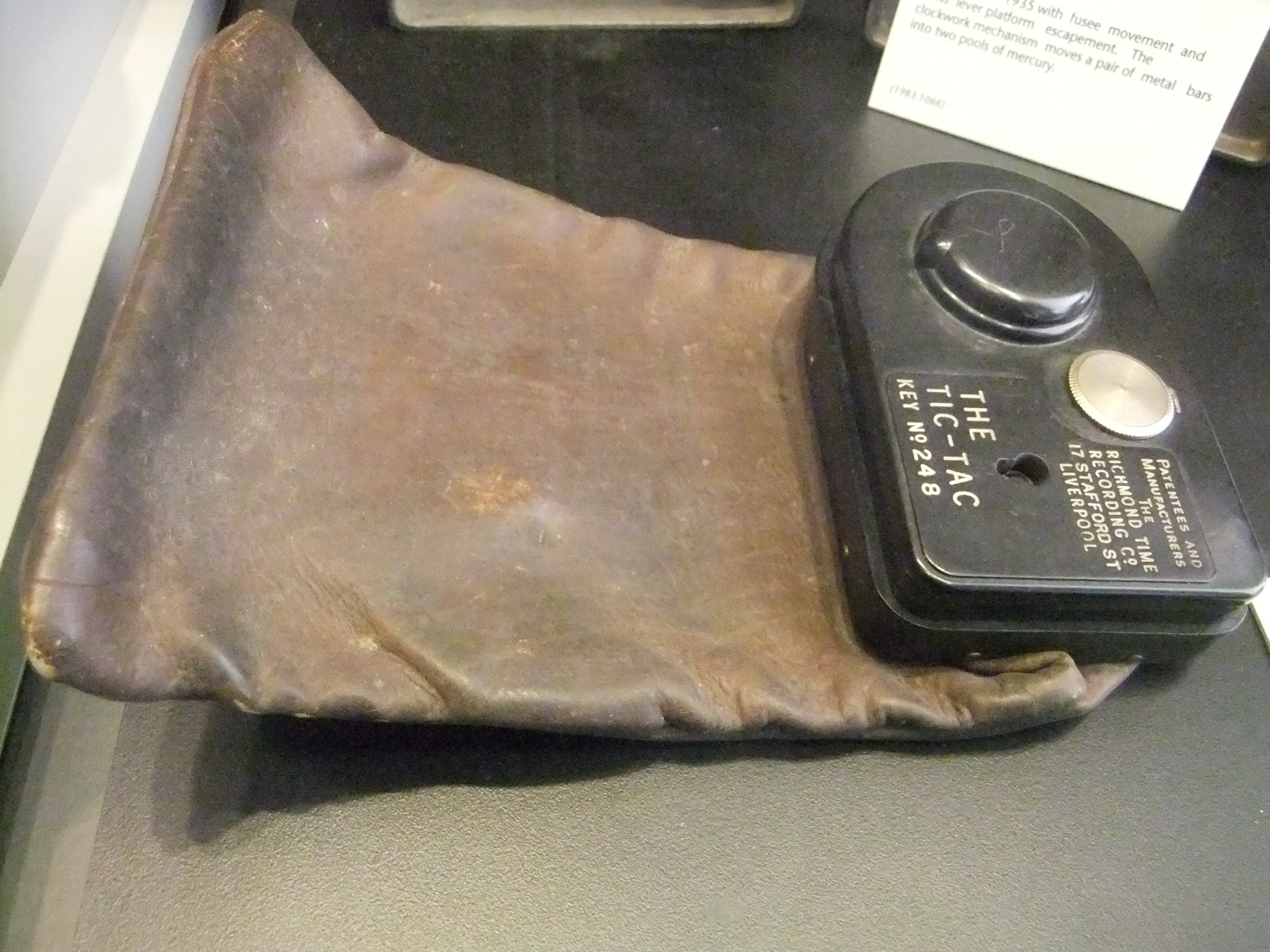
A bookmaker's satchel, used for holding betting slips, circa 1935

A clock bag (or bookmaker's satchel) is a bag used in bookmaking with a lock and a built-in clock, intended to prevent fraud by proving the bets inside had been placed before a sporting event had started. The bets, or "lines", inside would often be "rolled in bundles each marked by a pseudonym".

Clock bags were in regular use in illegal gambling starting during the 1920s. In Glasgow during the 1930s, runners would collect bets in clock bags and then telephone bookmakers for the outcomes. This was a common practice called "shovel betting".

It has been speculated that clock bags may have originated around pigeon racing.
