= Betting exchange =

Marketplace for customers to bet on the outcome of discrete events

A betting exchange is a marketplace for customers to bet on the outcome of discrete events. Betting exchanges offer the same opportunities to bet as a bookmaker with a few differences. Gamblers can buy (also known as "back") and sell (also known as "lay") the outcome, and they can trade in real-time throughout the event, either to cut their losses or lock in profit. Bookmaker operators generate revenue by offering less efficient odds. Betting exchanges normally generate revenue by charging a small commission on winning bets.

== History ==
The first betting exchanges were Matchbook, flutter.com and Betfair. Flutter and Betfair merged in 2001 with Betfair chosen as the primary betting exchange. The flutter.com site ceased operations in January 2002. Since then Betfair has maintained a leading position in the betting exchange market. BETDAQ (which also traded as the 'Ladbrokes Exchange') is believed to be the second largest betting exchange and it had an estimated 7% share of the betting exchange market in 2013. BETDAQ was owned by Ladbrokes plc (now Ladbrokes Coral) following their acquisition in February 2013, but has since been sold at the end of 2021 to Exchange Platform Solutions Limited.

== Exchanges and traditional bookmakers compared ==
Most exchanges make their money by charging a commission which is calculated as a percentage of net winnings for each customer on each event, or market. Gamblers whose betting activities have been restricted by bookmakers (normally for winning too much money) are able to place bets of unrestricted size as long as one or more opposing customers are willing to match their bets. The odds available on a betting exchange are usually better than those offered by bookmakers, in spite of the commission charged, because there are smaller overrounds.

In spite of these advantages, exchanges currently have some limitations. Because exchanges seek to concentrate their liquidity in as few markets as possible, they are not currently suited to unrestricted multiple parlay betting. Betfair does offer accumulators but these are limited in number and type: users cannot determine the outcomes contained in accumulators themselves. Some exchanges such as BETDAQ also offer multiples but the exchanges act in the same manner as traditional bookmakers in doing so (i.e. they themselves and not a customer act as the layer of such bets). Exchanges also tend to restrict the odds that can be offered to between 1.01 (1 to 100) and 1000 (999 to 1).

== Backing and laying ==
Traditionally betting has occurred between a customer and a bookmaker where the customer 'backs' (bets that an outcome will occur) and the bookmaker 'lays' (bets that the outcome will not occur). Betting exchanges offer the opportunity for anyone to both back and lay. The liability is the amount one can lose in the worst-case scenario.

For example, if someone thinks that Team A will win the competition, they may support that choice. The bookmaker offering this bet to the player will choose this option. Both sides will agree on the sponsor's bet and odds. If the team loses, the layer/bookmaker retains the patron's bet. If the team wins, the layer will pay the sponsor the winnings according to the agreed odds. Since every bet you make requires a patron and a layer, and the exchange of bets is not a participant in the bets made on it, any exchange of bets requires both patrons and layers.

== In-play betting ==
Exchanges allow bets to be made in-running or in-play (i.e. to make bets while a race or match is in progress). This feature is generally restricted to the most popular events for which widespread, live television coverage is available.

Whereas non-in-play bets are entered into the system immediately after being placed by the customer, when betting in-play a time delay might be instituted so as to make it somewhat more difficult for unscrupulous customers to accept offers for bets that for whatever reason have suddenly become highly favorable. Markets may also be actively managed by the operator. In this case, betting will be briefly halted after each occurrence likely to cause a substantial change in the odds (for example, in association football matches goals, penalty kicks and sendings off would warrant such suspensions), so that unmatched bets can be cancelled.

== Traders and arbitrageurs ==
Arbitrageurs (colloquially "arbers") attempt to simultaneously bet on all possible outcomes to make a guaranteed profit. A trader operates similarly to an arbitrageur but is willing to take on extra risk and bet on events where no immediate profit is possible. A trader hopes to make a profit by closing out the bet at a later stage at more favorable odds. Closing out a bet for profit involves collecting more money by laying than is paid out when the outcome is backed back. If the event does not occur then no money is lost, alternatively if a trader is able to lay a higher stake at shorter odds than his back stake then he can theoretically guarantee the same amount of profit regardless of the outcome. On the other hand, if the odds move against the trader he might elect to close out the bet so as to minimise his loss. Trading can be done either before the start of an event or while the event is in progress if in-play betting is offered. Compared to trading before the event commences, trading in-play usually involves both greater risk and also the potential to make more money.

Traders can make money by betting exclusively with betting exchanges or bookmakers, or by combining the two. The trader could lay at a low amount on a betting exchange and then back at a higher price with a bookie or another exchange. This must be done simultaneously to guarantee a profit or else the opportunity could quickly cease to exist with liquid markets quickly correcting prices and bookies trying to avoid being arbitraged.

Most exchanges post the book percentages (colloquially known as the overround or "vig") prominently for each market. These percentages are essentially the cumulative implied percentage chances of the odds on offer for each selection and for a single winner market will usually add up to more than 100% for all back selections (but only marginally over in a competitive market), and under 100% for the lay selections. This ensures that simultaneously backing or laying all selections in a market will not normally guarantee a profit. Occasionally though (especially in circumstances where odds are prone to change rapidly) exceptions will arise where offers to back or lay all selections will be made that if simultaneously and cumulatively accepted at exactly the right stakes would permit an arbitrageur to guarantee a profit. However, such phenomena tend to correct themselves very quickly and exchanges generally try to dissuade customers from attempting to take advantage of such circumstances.

Furthermore, for a trader or arbitrageur to combine different exchanges and/or bookmakers for a profit requires a substantial price differential if a profit is in fact to be made once the exchange's commission is taken into account. Even between exchanges, such large price differences are rare, brief and usually involve relatively small stakes. Fortunately for traders, almost all betting exchanges charge commission on net winnings only and charge no commission at all in the event of a net loss. This suits the trader's high turnover, low profit strategy provided he bets exclusively with a single exchange.

Unless a trader is willing to accept the risks inherent with in-play trading, the profit or loss for a trader will typically be no more than 10% of the total amount of his combined back and lay stakes in any particular market, so to make meaningful amounts of money a trader needs to commit a relatively large amount of capital. The trader therefore runs the risk of having a large unwanted bet on an event if he is unable to close his position before the event starts (e.g. if there are technical problems with his Internet connection or with the exchange).

Traders and arbitrageurs are often credited with "seeding" markets with more competitive prices than would be present without them. However, Betfair's imposition of a premium charge in September 2008 was seen by some as being directed at the most skilled traders, whom it is speculated trade for a loss very infrequently and thus would otherwise pay little in the way of commission. In response, rival exchanges have pledged not to introduce similar charges, perhaps in hopes of enticing traders to move their business (and capital) elsewhere.

== Controversy ==
The fact gamblers can lay outcomes on the exchanges has resulted in criticism from traditional bookmakers including the UK's "Big Three" - Gala Coral Group, Ladbrokes and William Hill. These firms argue that granting "anonymous" punters the ability to bet that an outcome will not happen is causing corruption in sports such as horse racing since it is much easier to ensure a horse will lose a race than to ensure that it will win.

Exchanges counter that, while corruption is possible on any gambling platform, the bookies' arguments are motivated not by concern for the integrity of sport but by commercial interests. Exchanges also assert they are well aware of who their customers are and keep a complete record of all betting activity in case of enquiries, whereas high-street bookies take anonymous cash bets. Furthermore, customers can monitor the odds on the exchanges' user-friendly platforms independently. Exchanges and the authorities can be immediately alerted should suspicious betting patterns become apparent. Some exchanges have signed agreements with governing bodies of sport including the Jockey Club, with whom they insist they will co-operate fully if the latter suspects corruption to have taken place. Exchanges have co-operated with police investigations when asked to do so, sometimes leading to arrests.

== See also ==
- Bookmaker – Organization or person that takes bets on sporting events
- Gambling – Wagering something of value on a random event
- Matched betting – Betting technique
- Parimutuel gambling – Betting system in which all bets of a particular type are placed together in a pool
- Prediction market – Platforms for betting on events
- Sports betting – Form of gambling
- Spread betting – Type of wagering where the pay-off is based on the accuracy of the wager
