= Parimutuel betting =

Betting system in which all bets of a particular type are placed together in a pool

Parimutuel betting, or pool betting, is a betting system in which all bets of a particular type are placed together in a pool, taxes and the house-take are deducted, and payoff odds are calculated by sharing of the pool among all winning bets. In some countries it is known as the tote, after the totalisator, which calculates and displays bets already made.

The parimutuel system is used in gambling on horse racing, greyhound racing, jai alai, and other sporting events of relatively short duration in which participants finish in a ranked order. A modified parimutuel system is also used in some lottery games.

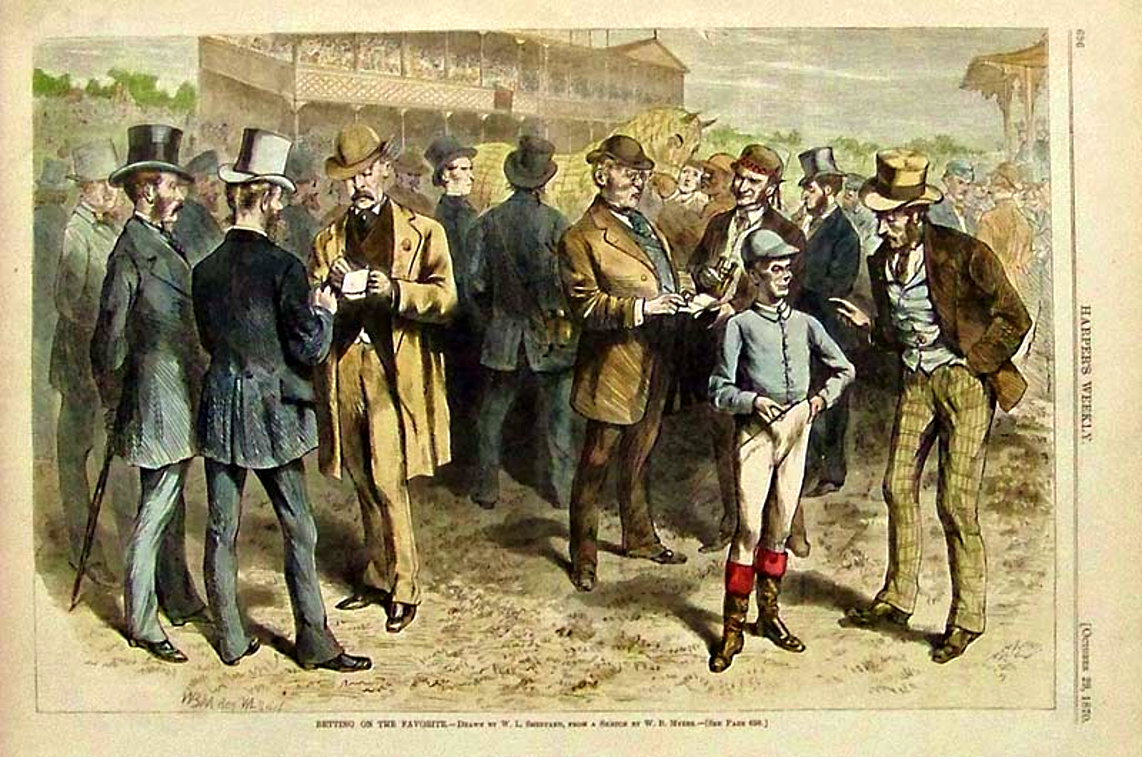
Betting on the Favorite, an 1870 engraving

Parimutuel betting differs from fixed-odds betting in that the final payout is not determined until the pool is closed — in fixed-odds betting, the payout is agreed at the time the bet is made.

Parimutuel gambling is frequently state-regulated, and it is offered in many places where gambling is otherwise illegal. Parimutuel gambling is often also offered at off-track facilities, where players may bet on the events without actually being present to observe them in person.

== Example ==
In a hypothetical event that has eight possible outcomes, in a country using a decimal currency such as dollars, each outcome has a certain amount of money wagered:

| Outcome | Wager |
|---|---|
| 1 | 60.00 |
| 2 | 140.00 |
| 3 | 24.00 |
| 4 | 110.00 |
| 5 | 220.00 |
| 6 | 94.00 |
| 7 | 300.00 |
| 8 | 80.00 |
| Total | 1028.00 |

Thus, the total pool of money on the event is $1028.00. Following the start of the event, no more wagers are accepted. Then suppose Outcome 4 occurs. The payout is now calculated. First the commission or take for the wagering company is deducted from the pool. For example, with a commission rate of 14.25% the calculation is: $1028 × 0.1425 = $146.49. This leaves a remaining amount of $881.51. This remaining amount in the pool is now distributed to those who wagered on Outcome 4: $881.51 / $110.00 = 8.01 ≈ $8 payout per $1 wagered. This payout includes the $1 wagered plus an additional $7 profit. Thus, the odds on Outcome 4 are 7-to-1 (or, expressed as decimal odds, 8.01).

Prior to the event, betting agencies will often provide an approximate pay-out figure for each given outcome should no more bets be accepted after the current time. Using the wagers and commission rate above (14.25%), an approximates table in decimal odds and fractional odds would be:

| Outcome | Decimal odds | Approx. fractional odds |
|---|---|---|
| 1 | 14.69 | 13–1 |
| 2 | 6.30 | 5–1 |
| 3 | 36.73 | 35–1 |
| 4 | 8.01 | 7–1 |
| 5 | 4.01 | 3–1 |
| 6 | 9.38 | 8–1 |
| 7 | 2.94 | 2–1 |
| 8 | 11.02 | 10–1 |

In real-life examples, such as horse racing, the pool size often extends into millions of dollars with many different types of outcomes (winning horses) and complex commission calculations.

Sometimes, the amounts paid out are rounded down to a denomination interval — in California, Australia, and British Columbia, 10¢ intervals are used. The rounding loss is known as breakage and is retained by the betting agency as part of the commission.

In some situations, a negative breakage may occur — for example, in horse racing when an overwhelming favorite wins (or shows or places). The parimutuel calculation results might call for a very small winning payout (say, $1.02 or $1.03 on a dollar bet), but legal regulations might require a larger payout (e.g., minimum $1.10 on a dollar bet). This condition is sometimes referred to as a minus pool.

=== Algebraic summary ===
In an event with a set of n possible single-winner outcomes, with wagers W_{1}, W_{2}, ..., W_{n} the total pool of money on the event is

$$W_T = \sum^n_{i=1} W_i.$$

After the wagering company deducts a commission rate of r from the pool, the amount remaining to be distributed between the successful bettors is W_{R} = W_{T}(1 − r). Those who bet on the successful outcome m will receive a payout of W_{R} / W_{m} for every dollar they bet on it.

When there are k possible winners, such as a North American "place" bet which has k = 2 winners, the total amount to be distributed W_{R} is first divided into k equal shares. If m is one of the k winners, those who bet on outcome m will receive a payout of (W_{R} / k) / W_{m} for every dollar they bet on it.

== History ==
The parimutuel system was invented by French-Catalan entrepreneur and showman impresario Joseph Oller in 1867.

The large amount of calculation involved in this system led to the invention of a specialized mechanical calculating machine known as a totalisator, "automatic totalisator" or "tote board", invented by the Australian engineer George Alfred Julius. The first was installed at Ellerslie Racecourse, Auckland, New Zealand, in 1913, and they came into widespread use at race courses throughout the world. The U.S. introduction was in 1927, which led to the opening of the suburban Arlington Racetrack in Arlington Park, near Chicago, and Sportsman's Park in Cicero, Illinois, in 1932.

== Strategy and comparison with independent bookmakers ==
Unlike many forms of casino gambling, in parimutuel betting the gambler bets against other gamblers, not the house, which necessarily implies that the bank cannot be broken. The science of predicting the outcome of a race is called handicapping.

Independent off-track bookmakers typically have a smaller take and thus offer better payoffs, but they are illegal in some countries. However, the introduction of Internet gambling led to "rebate shops". These off-shore betting shops promise to return some percentage of every bet made to the bettor. They may reduce their take from 15–18% to as little as 1–2%, while still generating a profit by operating with minimal overhead.

== By region ==
There may be several different types of bets, in which case each type of bet has its own pool. The basic bets involve predicting the order of finish for a single participant, as follows:

=== North America ===
In Canada and the United States, the most common types of bet on horse races include:

Single race

- Win: to succeed the bettor must pick the horse that wins the race.
- Place: the bettor must pick a horse that finishes either first or second.
- Show: the bettor must pick a horse that finishes first, second or third.
- Across the board: the bettor places three separate bets to win, place or show.
- Exacta, perfecta, or exactor: the bettor must pick the two horses that finish first and second, in the exact order.
- Trifecta or triactor: the bettor must pick the three horses that finish first, second, and third, in the exact order.
- Superfecta: the bettor must pick the four horses that finish first, second, third and fourth, in the exact order.
- Quinella or Quiniela: (Note: Quiniela (or quinella) reportedly "is traced back to pelota or jai alai, where it originated.") the bettor must pick the two horses that finish first and second, in any order.
- Any2 or Duet: The bettor must pick two horses who will place first, second or third but can finish in any order. This could be thought of as a double horse show key (see below).
- Hi 5 or Super 5: The bettor must pick five horses finishing in the exact order. Typically does not occur unless there are 8 or more horses in a race.

Multiple races

- Double: the bettor must pick the winners of two successive races
- Triple, Pick3 or Treble: the bettor must pick the winners of three successive races
- Quadrella or Quaddie: The bettor must pick the winners of four nominated races at the same track.
- Pick six or Sweep six: the bettor must pick the winners of six consecutive races.

=== Australia/New Zealand ===
Single race

- Win: Runner must finish first.
- Place: Runner must finish first, second or third place. In events with five to seven runners, no dividends are payable on third place (signified by "NTD" or No Third Dividend) and in events with 4 or fewer runners, only Win betting is allowed.
- Each-way: A combination of Win and Place. A $5 bet Each-way is a $5.00 bet to Win and a $5.00 bet to Place, for a total bet cost of $10.
- Exacta: The bettor must correctly pick the two runners which finish first and second.
- Quinella: The bettor must pick the two runners which finish first and second, but need not specify which will finish first.
- Trifecta: The bettor must correctly pick the three runners which finish first, second, and third.
- First4: The bettor must correctly pick the four runners which finish first, second, third and fourth.
- Duet: The bettor must pick two horses who will place first, second or third but can finish in any order.

Multiple races

- Running double: The bettor must pick the winners of two consecutive races at same track.
- Daily double: The bettor must pick the winners of two nominated races at the same track.
- Treble: The bettor must pick the winners of three nominated races at the same track. This bet type is only available in the states of Queensland and South Australia.
- Quadrella or Quaddie: The bettor must pick the winners of four nominated races at the same track.

=== United Kingdom ===
The following pools are operated at meetings in mainland Britain:

Single race

- Win: Runner must finish first.
- Place: Runner must finish within the first two places (in a 5–7 runner race), three places (8–15 runners and non-handicaps with 16+ runners) or four places (handicaps with 16+ runners).
- Each-way: Charged and settled as one bet to win and another bet to place (for example, a punter asking for a bet of "five pounds each way" will be expected to pay ten pounds).
- Exacta: The bettor must correctly pick the two runners which finish first and second, in the correct order.
- Trifecta: The bettor must correctly pick the three runners which finish first, second, and third, in the correct order.
- Swinger: The bettor must correctly pick two runners to finish in the places, both runners must place, in any order.

Multiple races

- Jackpot: Pick the winner from each of the first six races of the advertised Jackpot meeting of the day.
- Placepot: Pick a placed horse from each of the first six races from any British race meeting.
- Quadpot: Pick a placed horse from the third, fourth, fifth and sixth race from any British race meeting.
- Scoop6: Pick the winner (for the win fund) or a placed horse (for the place fund) from the six advertised Scoop6 races. Saturdays only.
- Super7: Pick the winner from seven races. This bet ceased being offered by totepool from January 2012.

=== Ireland ===
Tote Ireland operates the following pools

Single race

- Win: Runner must finish first
- Place: Runner must finish within the first two places (in a 5–7 runner race), three places (8–15 runners and non-handicaps with 16+ runners) or four places (handicaps with 16+ runners). (From 23 April 2000 to 23 May 2010, Tote Ireland operated 4-place betting on all races with 16 or more runners.)
- Each-way: Charged and settled as one bet to win and another bet to place (for example, a punter asking for a bet of "five euro each way" will be expected to pay ten euro).
- Exacta: The bettor must correctly pick the two runners which finish first and second, in the correct order (replaced Forecast which allowed any order).
- Trifecta: The bettor must correctly pick the three runners which finish first, second, and third, in the correct order (introduced on 26 May 2010, replacing Trio which allowed any order).

Multiple races

- Jackpot: A Pick 4 bet on races 3–6 at every meeting.
- Pick Six: On races 1–6 at one meeting on all Sundays and occasionally on other days (introduced on 9 January 2011).
- Placepot: The better must correctly pick one horse to place in each of the races 2–7.

=== Sweden ===
Bet types for harness racing (trotting):

Single race

- Vinnare (winner): Runner must finish first.
- Plats (place): Runner must finish within the first two places (up to five runners) or first three places (six runners or more).
- Vinnare & Plats: Two bets, one on "vinnare" and one on "plats" for the same runner. Asking for a bet of "50 SEK vinnare och plats" costs 100 SEK
- Tvilling (twin): The bettor must pick the runners that finish first and second, but need not specify which will finish first.
- Trio (trio): The bettor must pick the runners that finish first, second and third in a nominated race.

Multiple races

- Dagens Dubbel (daily double) and Lunchdubbel (lunch double): The bettor must pick the winners of two nominated races at the same track.
- V3: The bettor must pick the winners of three nominated races at the same track. Unlike V4, V5, V65 and V75, where a bet for all races must be made before the start of the first race, in V3 the bettor selects the winner one race at a time.
- V4: The bettor must pick the winners of four nominated races at the same track.
- V5: The bettor must pick the winners of five nominated races at the same track.
- V65: The bettor must pick the winners of six nominated races at the same track. Return is also given for (combinations of) five correctly picked winners, even if the same bet included all the six winners.
- V64: The bettor must pick the winners of six nominated races at the same track. Return is also given for (combinations of) five or four correctly picked winners, even if the same bet included more correct picks.
- V75: The bettor must pick the winners of seven nominated races at the same track. Return is also given for (combinations of) six or five winners picked correctly, even if the same bet included more correct picks. The betting pool is split into three separate pools for all combinations of seven (40%), six (20%) and five (40%) correctly picked winners. This is the largest nationwide betting game in Sweden, running each Saturday with weekly pools of about 80 MSEK ($11 million).
- V86: The bettor must pick the winners of eight nominated races at the same track. Return is also given for (combinations of) seven or six winners picked correctly, even if the same bet included more correct picks. The betting pool is split into three separate pools for all combinations of eight (40%), seven (20%) and six (40%) correctly picked winners.

=== Hong Kong ===
The Hong Kong Jockey Club (HKJC) operates the following common bet types and pools for horse racing.

Single race

- Win: Select correctly the 1st horse in a race.
- Place: Select correctly the 1st, 2nd or 3rd horse in a race with 7 or more declared starters, alternatively select correctly the 1st or 2nd in a race where there are 4 to 6 declared starters.
- Quinella: Select correctly the 1st and 2nd horses in any order in a race.
- Quinella Place: Select correctly any two of the first three placed horses in any order in a race.
- Forecast: Select the 1st and 2nd horses in the correct order in a race.
- Tierce: Select the 1st, 2nd and 3rd horses in the correct order in a race.
- Trio: Select correctly the 1st, 2nd and 3rd horses in any order in a race.
- Quartet: Select correctly the 1st, 2nd, 3rd and 4th in correct order in a race
- First 4: Select correctly the 1st, 2nd, 3rd and 4th horses in any order in a race.

Multiple races

- Double: Select correctly the 1st horse in each of the two nominated races. There is a consolation prize given under the conditions that the player has selected correctly the 1st horse in the first nominated race and the 2nd horse in the second nominated race.
- Treble: Select correctly the 1st horse in each of the three nominated races. There is a consolation prize given under the conditions that the player has selected correctly the 1st horse in the first two Legs and the 2nd horse in the third Leg of the three nominated races.
- Double Trio: Select correctly the 1st, 2nd and 3rd horses in any order in each of the two nominated races.
- Triple Trio: Select correctly the 1st, 2nd and 3rd in any order in each of the three nominated races. There is a consolation prize given under the conditions that the player has selected correctly the 1st, 2nd and 3rd horses in any order in the first two Legs of the three nominated races.
- Six Up: Select correctly the 1st or 2nd horse in each of the six nominated races. There is a jackpot prize given under the conditions that the player has selected correctly the 1st horse in each of the six nominated races.

=== Japan ===
In Japan, horse racing (競馬, keiba), velodrome cycling (競輪, keirin), stock outboard powerboat racing (競艇, Kyōtei), and paved flat track motorcycle racing (オートレース, Auto Race) operate the following parimutuel types. Wager must be a multiple of 100 yen except Each-way.

- Win (単勝, Tanshō): Runner must finish first. (horse racing, powerboat racing, flat track racing)
- Place-Show (複勝, Fukushō): Runner must finish within the first two places (up to seven participants) or three places (more than eight participants). (horse racing, powerboat racing, flat track racing)
- Each-way (応援馬券, Ōen Baken): To place one bet to Win and another bet to Place-Show. (For example, betting 1,000 yen to Each-way means betting 500 yen to Win and 500 yen to Place-Show.) Wager must be multiple of 200 yen (JRA-sanctioned horse racing).
- Bracket Quinella (枠番連勝複式, Wakuban Renshō Fukushiki), abbreviated as Waku-ren (枠連): The bettor must pick the two bracket numbers which finish first and second, but need not specify which will finish first. A bracket number (枠番, Wakuban) means runner's cap color (1: White; 2: Black; 3: Red; 4: Blue; 5: Yellow; 6: Green; 7: Orange; 8: Pink) (used in horse racing, cycling, and flat track).
- Bracket Exacta (枠番連勝単式, Wakuban Renshō Tanshiki), abbreviated as Waku-tan (枠単): The bettor must correctly pick the two bracket numbers which finish first and second (non-JRA horse racing).
- Quinella (連勝複式, Renshō Fukushiki), abbreviated as Uma-ren (馬連), Ni-sha-fuku (2車複) or Ni-renpuku (2連複): The bettor must pick the two runners which finish first and second, but need not specify which will finish first (all four).
- Exacta (連勝単式, Renshō Tanshiki), abbreviated as Uma-tan (馬単), Ni-sha-tan (2車単) or Ni-ren-tan (2連単): The bettor must correctly pick the two runners which finish first and second (all four).
- Quinella-Place (拡大連勝複式, Kakudai Renshō Fukushiki), also known as Wide (ワイド) or Kaku-renpuku (拡連複): The bettor must pick the two runners which finish the top three — no need to specify an order (For example, when the result of race is 3-6-2-4-5-1, the top three runners are 2, 3 and 6, and winning combinations are 2-3, 2-6 and 3-6.) (all four).
- Trio (3連勝複式, Sanrensho Fukushiki), abbreviated as San-renpuku (3連複): The bettor must pick the three runners which finish the top three, but no need to specify an order (all four).
- Trifecta (3連勝単式, Sanrensho Tanshiki), abbreviated as San-ren-tan (3連単): The bettor must correctly pick the three runners which finish first, second, and third (all four).
- WIN 5 / Select 5: The bettor must pick the winners of five designated races. Betting on operators' website by PC or cellular phone only (horse racing only).

=== France ===
The following bet type are offered by the government-controlled betting agency Pari Mutuel Urbain (PMU).

- Simple Gagnant (Win): The bettor must correctly pick the runner that finishes first.
- Simple Placé (Place): The bettor must pick a runner that finishes either first, second or third in the race. If there are 7 or less starters in the race then third place is not counted and the bettor must pick a horse that finishes either first or second. This bet type is not available on events with 3 or fewer runners.
- Couplé Gagnant (Quinella): The bettor must correctly pick the two runners which finish first and second in any order.
- Couplé Placé (Duet): The bettor must correctly pick two of the first three finishers in any order. This bet type is not available on events with 3 or fewer runners.
- Couplé Ordre (Exacta): The bettor must correctly pick the two runners which finish first and second in the correct order. Only available on races with 4-7 runners.
- Trio: The bettor must correctly pick the first three finishers in any order. Only available on races with 8+ runners.
- Trio Ordre (Trifecta): The bettor must correctly pick the first, second and third finishers in their finishing order. Only available on races with 4-7 runners.
- Tiercé/Tiercé Classic: First created in 1954. The bettor must correctly pick the first, second and third finishers in the race with a main dividend paid for selecting the exact order of finish, and a secondary "Désordre" dividend paid for selecting the correct three runners but in the wrong order. Essentially a combination Trio Ordre/Trio bet with the main dividend paying at least 5 times the secondary one. On popular or famous races this bet type is sometimes labelled "Tiercé Classique" but follows the same rules as the standard Tiercé.
- Quarté+: The bettor aims to correctly pick the first four finishers in the race with a main dividend paid for selecting the first four runners in their exact order of finish, a secondary "Désordre" dividend paid for the selecting the first four finishers but in an incorrect finishing order and a tertiary "Bonus" dividend paid for correctly selecting only the first three runners (in any order).
- Quinté+: The bettor aims to correctly pick the first five finishers in the race with a main dividend paid for selecting the first five runners in their exact finishing order, a secondary "Désordre" dividend paid for the selecting the first five finishers but in an incorrect finishing order, a "Bonus 4" dividend for selecting the first four finishers in any order, a "Bonus 4sur5" dividend for selecting four of the first five finishers in any order and a "Bonus 3" for selecting the first three finishers in any order. Furthermore, each Quinté+ ticket is given a number between 1 and 3,000 for a possibility of winning the Tirelire which is a cumulated jackpot of at least €500,000 but often exceeding millions of euros. In order to win this jackpot, one needs to win the Quinté Ordre (five first finishers in order) and have the winning number which is drawn and published moments before the race starts. A matching No Plus number multiplies earning by ten on any Quinté ticket irrespective of the order.
- Pick5: The bettor aims to correctly pick the first five finishers in the race irrespective of the order. PMU selects races on which this bet is available.
- 2sur4: The bettor must correctly pick two out of the first four finishers in the race in any order. Only available on races with 10 or more starters.
- Multi/Mini Multi: The bettor selects between 4 and 7 horses for the Multi and between 4 and 6 for the Mini Multi which must contain the first four finishers in the race in any order. The main "Gagnant en 4" dividend is paid to winning bettors who selected four horses, with decreasing "Gagnant en 5", "Gagnant en 6" and "Gagnant en 7" dividends paid to winning bettors who selected five, six and seven horses respectively. The "Multi" bet operates on races with 14 or more starters. The "Mini Multi" operates on races with 10 to 13 starters and only allows for a maximum of six selections with no "Gagnant en 7" dividend.
- Super4: The better must correctly pick the first, second, third, and fourth finishers in the correct order. Only available on races with 5-9 runners.

Tiercé, Quarté+ and Quinté+ bets are typically only offered on the largest race of the day.

== See also ==
- Advance-deposit wagering
- Arbitrage betting
- Betting exchange
- Betting pool
- Bookmaker
- Calcutta auction
- Prediction market
- Spread betting
- Sports betting systems
- Tote Ireland
