= Full cover bet =

A full cover bet is any bet which consists of all available multiple bets over a given number of selections.

Examples of full cover bets:

- Trixie - three selections
- Yankee - four selections
- Canadian or Super Yankee - five selections
- Heinz - six selections
- Super Heinz - seven selections
- Goliath - eight selections

Examples of full cover bets with singles included:

- Patent - three selections
- Lucky 15 - four selections
- Lucky 31 - five selections
- Lucky 63 - six selections

The Lucky bets are so named because of the bookmaker's practice of offering bonuses for one or more winning selections; most common of which is 'double the odds' for one winner. The offering of a percentage increase in winnings for the success of two or more selections in these Lucky bets is primarily to compensate for the compounding of the overround when two or more events with individual overrounds on their books are combined in doubles, trebles and accumulators.

== See also ==
- Glossary of bets offered by UK bookmakers, a list of traditional and popular bets.
- Mathematics of bookmaking
