= HMS Teazer =

Eight ships of the Royal Navy have been named HMS Teazer :

- Teazer was a gunboat purchased in the West Indies that participated in the capture of Martinique, St Lucia, and Guadeloupe in 1794
- HMS Teazer (1794) was a 14-gun gunvessel launched in 1794 and sold in 1802.
- HMS Teazer (1798) was a 6-gun schooner purchased in 1798 for local use off Honduras. Her fate is unknown.
- HMS Teazer (1804) was a 12-gun gun-brig launched in 1804; the French captured her in 1805, but the British recaptured her in 1811 and sold her in 1815.
- HMS Teazer (1846) was a Teazer-class gunvessel launched in 1846 and broken up in 1862.
- HMS Teazer (1868) was a Beacon-class composite gunboat launched in 1868 and broken up in 1887.
- HMS Teazer (1895) was a Conflict-class destroyer launched in 1895 and sold in 1912.
- HMS Teazer (1917) was an R-class destroyer launched in 1917 and sold in 1931.
- HMS Teazer (R23) was a T-class destroyer launched in 1943. She was converted to a Type 16 frigate between 1953 and 1955, and was broken up in 1965.
