= Glossary of bets offered by UK bookmakers =

This is a non-exhaustive list of traditional and popular bets offered by bookmakers in the United Kingdom. The "multiple-selection" bets in particular are most often associated with horse racing selections but since the advent of fixed-odds betting on football matches some punters use these traditional combination bets for football selections as well.

== Types of bet ==
=== Win ===
A bet that produces a return only if the selection comes first in an event (i.e. wins). A win bet may be placed on a single event.

=== Place ===
A bet that produces a return only if the selection finishes first or within a predetermined number of positions (places) of the winner of an event. The return is often based on a fixed proportion of the win odds of the selection.

=== Each-way ===
A combination of win and place bets of equal size. Each-way bets may be placed on a single event or on two or more selections in a multiple bet. Each-way multiple bets are settled on a win-to-win and place-to-place basis.

== Single ==
A bet on an individual selection or outcome.

== Multiple bet ==
A double, treble or accumulator. A linked series of win singles where all the return from the first selection is automatically staked on the second selection as a win single and so on until all selections have won, thus giving a return, or until one selection loses in which case the whole bet is lost.

=== Double ===
A bet on two selections, both of which must win to gain a return.

=== Treble ===
A bet on three selections, all three of which must win to gain a return.

=== Accumulator ===
A bet on four or more selections, all of which must win to gain a return. Accumulators are often named after the number of selections they contain; thus we can get a fourfold, fivefold or sixfold accumulator (or even higher).

== Full cover bet ==
A wager consisting of all possible doubles, trebles and accumulators across a given number of selections. These include: Trixie, Yankee, Canadian or Super Yankee, Heinz, Super Heinz and Goliath. A double may be thought of as a full cover bet with only two selections.

=== Trixie ===
A wager on three selections and consisting of four separate bets: 3 doubles and a treble. A minimum two selections must win to gain a return.

=== Yankee ===
A wager on four selections and consisting of 11 separate bets: 6 doubles, 4 trebles and a fourfold accumulator. A minimum two selections must win to gain a return.

=== Canadian or Super Yankee ===
A wager on five selections and consisting of 26 separate bets: 10 doubles, 10 trebles, 5 fourfolds and a fivefold accumulator. A minimum two selections must win to gain a return.

=== Heinz ===
A wager on six selections and consisting of 57 separate bets: 15 doubles, 20 trebles, 15 fourfolds, 6 fivefolds and a sixfold accumulator. A minimum two selections must win to gain a return. It is named for the "57 varieties" advertising slogan of the H. J. Heinz Company.

=== Super Heinz ===
A wager on seven selections and consisting of 120 separate bets: 21 doubles, 35 trebles, 35 fourfolds, 21 fivefolds, 7 sixfolds and a sevenfold accumulator. A minimum two selections must win to gain a return.

=== Goliath ===
A wager on eight selections and consisting of 247 separate bets: 28 doubles, 56 trebles, 70 fourfolds, 56 fivefolds, 28 sixfolds, 8 sevenfolds and an eightfold accumulator. A minimum two selections must win to gain a return.

== Full cover bets with singles ==
=== Patent ===
A wager on three selections and consisting of 7 separate bets: 3 singles, 3 doubles and a treble. Equivalent to a Trixie plus 3 singles. One winning selection will guarantee a return.

=== Lucky 15 ===
A wager on four selections and consisting of 15 separate bets: 4 singles, 6 doubles, 4 trebles and a fourfold accumulator. Equivalent to a Yankee plus 4 singles. One winning selection will guarantee a return. The "Lucky" part of the name of this and other similar bets comes from the bookmaker's practice of offering bonuses for one or more winners; usually including "double the odds" for only one winning selection.

=== Lucky 31 ===
A wager on five selections and consisting of 31 separate bets: 5 singles, 10 doubles, 10 trebles, 5 fourfolds and a fivefold accumulator. Equivalent to a Canadian plus 5 singles. One winning selection will guarantee a return.

=== Lucky 63 ===
A wager on six selections and consisting of 63 separate bets: 6 singles, 15 doubles, 20 trebles, 15 fourfolds, 6 fivefolds and a sixfold accumulator. One winning selection will guarantee a return.

=== Alphabet ===
A bet consisting of six selections - 1, 2, 3, 4, 5, and 6, usually on horse racing or greyhound racing. Selections 1, 2, and 3 form a patent, as described above. Selections 4, 5, and 6 form a second patent. Selections 2, 3, 4, and 5 form a Yankee, as described above. Selections 1, 2, 3, 4, 5, and 6 form a sixfold accumulator, as described above. The total number of bets in an alphabet is therefore 26 [2 patents at 7 bets each, plus 1 yankee at 11 bets, and one accumulator at one bet - (7+7+11+1=26)]. At least one correct selection guarantees a return.

== "Any to Come" (ATC) or "if cash" bets ==
Wagers which include conditional bets, i.e. if part of the wager produces a sufficient return then a predetermined amount may be wagered on one or more of the other selections. ATC and "if cash" bets (generally referred to as "conditional bets") are normally not accepted on Ante-post selections.

=== Up-and-Down ===
An example of an "if cash" or "any-to-come (ATC)" bet. A wager on two selections and consisting of two single bets. If one selection wins (hence the phrase "if cash") then the original stake is placed as an additional single bet on the second selection. If both selections win each original stake is placed as a single on the other selection: in effect giving twice the winnings for just two stake units. The downside of only one winning selection is that both original stakes are lost.
Usually played for "single stakes about (SSA)" meaning stakes identical to the original ones are placed on selections in the case of one or more winners. "Double stakes about (DSA)" means twice the original stake is placed on selections in the case of one or more winners. Note: an odds-on winner will not supply enough money for "double stakes about" so the whole amount actually available is used.

=== Round Robin ===
A wager on three selections and consisting of 10 separate bets: 3 doubles, 1 treble and 3 up-and-down bets (each of 2 separate bets). It may be considered to be a Trixie to which 3 up-and-down bets have been added. One winning selection will guarantee a return.

=== Flag ===
A wager on four selections and consisting of 23 separate bets: 6 doubles, 4 trebles, 1 fourfold and 6 up-and-down bets. It may be considered to be a Yankee to which 6 up-and-down bets have been added. One winning selection will guarantee a return.

=== Super Flag ===
A wager on five selections and consisting of 46 separate bets: 10 doubles, 10 trebles, 5 fourfolds, 1 fivefold and 10 up-and-down bets. It may be considered to be a Canadian to which 10 up-and-down bets have been added. One winning selection will guarantee a return.

=== Rounder ===
A wager on three selections A, B and C consisting of 3 singles and 3 any-to-come (ATC) doubles to the original singles stakes. For example: £1 win A, ATC £1 double BC; £1 win B, ATC £1 double AC; £1 win C, ATC £1 double AB.

=== Roundabout ===
As Rounder (above) except the ATC doubles are to twice the stake, e.g. £1 win A, ATC £2 double BC etc. Note: In the event of an odds-on winner the complete returns (less than £2 in this example) from the winning single are bet on the appropriate double.

== Speciality bets ==
=== Union Jack ===
A wager on nine selections usually placed in a 3 by 3 grid on a purpose-designed betting slip and consisting of 8 trebles. If the selections A to I are placed thus:

A	B	C
D	E	F
G	H	I

then the 8 trebles are (horizontally) ABC, DEF, GHI, (vertically) ADG, BEH, CFI, (diagonally) AEI, CEG. All three selections in a particular treble must win to achieve a return. It is possible to get five or even six winners from the nine selections and yet still not achieve any return (e.g. A, B, E, F, G do not give a winning treble in example 1, and A, B, D, F, H, I do not produce a return in example 2, as shown below).
Example 1

A	B	C
D	E	F
G	H	I

Example 2

A	B	C
D	E	F
G	H	I

Selection E appears in 4 of the trebles; A, C, G and I appear in 3 trebles; B, D, F, and H appear in only 2 trebles.
This is considered more of a novelty bet.

== Forecasts ==
Forecasts are bets on a single event that require the correct forecasting of the finishing order of (usually) the first two or three finishers in the event. Returns on correctly predicted finishing orders are calculated by industry sources via computer software that uses the starting price of all participants in the event, and are usually declared to a £1 stake unit on (mainly) horse and greyhound races.

=== Straight Forecast ===
A straight forecast or computer straight forecast is a wager requiring the naming of two selections a and b to finish 1st and 2nd in the correct order in a specified event. Requires a single unit stake. Usually declared on horse and greyhound races of three or more runners. Equivalent to the United States exacta or perfecta, or the Canadian exactor.

=== Reversed Forecast ===
A reversed forecast (RF) is a wager requiring the naming of two selections to finish 1st and 2nd in either order in a specified event. It is the same as two straight forecasts on selections a and b: a 1st, b 2nd and b 1st, a 2nd. Requires two unit stakes. Equivalent to a "boxed" exacta/perfecta in North America, where the quinella is a similar wager that requires only one unit stake.

=== Combination Forecast ===
A combination forecast is a wager on three or more named selections in order to choose two of the selections to finish 1st and 2nd in the correct order in a specified event. It is the same as the number of straight forecasts on selections a, b ... n given by the formula n(n − 1) and therefore requires this number of unit stakes. E.g. 3 selections - 6 bets; 4 selections - 12 bets; 5 selections - 20 bets; etc. Equivalent to boxing an exacta/perfecta with more than two runners in North America.

=== Tricast ===
A tricast is a wager requiring the choosing of three named selections a, b and c to finish 1st, 2nd and 3rd in the correct order in a specified event. Requires a single unit stake. Accepted on horse races where 8 or more horses are declared and at least 6 run, and on greyhound races of 5 or more runners that form part of the bookmakers' main service. In North America, this wager is known as the trifecta (USA) or triactor (Canada).

=== Combination Tricast ===
A combination tricast is a wager on three or more named selections in order to choose three selections to finish 1st, 2nd and 3rd in the correct order in a specified event. Requires multiple unit stakes given by n(n − 1) (n − 2) where n is the number of selections. E.g. 3 selections, 6 bets; 4 selections, 24 bets; 5 selections, 60 bets; etc. In North America, this is a "boxed" trifecta.

== See also ==
- Mathematics of bookmaking
