= Parlay =

Type of bet

A parlay, accumulator (or acca), combo bet, or multi is a single bet that links together two or more individual wagers, usually seen in sports betting. Winning the parlay is dependent on all of those wagers winning together. If any of these bets in the parlay lose, the entire parlay loses. If any of the plays in the parlay ties, or "pushes", the parlay reverts to a lower number of wagers with the payout odds reducing accordingly. Parlay bets are high-risk, high-reward; linking the possibilities drastically reduces the chance of the bet paying off overall. The benefit of the parlay is that there are much higher pay-offs, although as usual, casinos and bookkeepers offering parlays often exploit the poor calculation of gamblers by not increasing the pay-out as much as the odds truly demand, with the effect of the house edge increasing in parlays.

Although a variety of bets can be used to build a parlay bet, correlated parlays are usually not allowed by traditional bookmakers. Correlated parlays are two or more bets from the same game that rely on a closely related outcome: for example, betting that a football (soccer) team might both score more than three goals in a match, and also win the match. These are not independent events, as a team that scores more than three goals is also very likely to win the match. A naive application of odds that treated these events as uncorrelated would not accurately reflect the probability of the linked bet. However, with the rise of sports betting through mobile gambling apps in the late 2010s–2020s, this traditional hesitance has weakened. These newer apps often allow "microbets" on propositions such as if the current possession will end in a score, and further allow these props to be bundled into parlays. The system then attempts to compensate for the degree of correlation. While these systems usually prefer to lean heavily in the house's favor, the increased volatility has resulted in some notable cases where bettors have found favorable odds. This does not always a windfall for the bettors, as sportsbooks have sometimes simply refused to pay out when such parlays come through.

While parlays were traditionally an uncommon side-bet, they have become more common in sports betting apps of the 2020s. Due to the larger house edge on parlays, they now account for over 60% of the revenue of some sports betting companies, a substantially larger proportion than the number of bets by volume.

== History ==
Parlays were introduced into New York-area racetrack gambling in 1988, but a 1989 newspaper article indicated that they still weren't very popular, perhaps due to the large surcharges and fees charged by off-track betting (OTB) parlors.

Parlays became more popular in the United States in the late 2010s and 2020s as regulations on sports betting were loosened. Mobile app design has made it easy for bettors to convert multiple bets into a parlay with the click of a button, increasing the potential payout if the parlay succeeds while reducing their expected earnings over time. Additionally, psychologically, losses can be disguised as near-wins; while getting three out of four legs correct pays no better than zero out of four legs, it can still "feel" like a win, and suggest making another attempted parlay to win the next time. While most bets on parlays are smaller than "straight" bets and they are still a minority of bets placed by volume, they add up and have proven lucrative for casinos due to the huge house edge many times stronger than for other bet types. A 2025 report wrote that bettors are losing billions of dollars to these e-casino apps on parlays. A FanDuel executive said in their defense that "customers understand that these [parlays] are fun, entertaining bets with a lower likelihood of winning."

== Odds and payout ==
Parlay bets are paid out at odds higher than the typical single game bet, but still below the "true" odds. For instance, a common two-team NFL parlay based entirely on the spread generally has a payout of 2.64:1. In reality, however, if one assumes that each single game bet is 50/50, the true payout should instead be 3:1.

== Examples ==
Suppose each match in a parlay has moneyline odds of −110, meaning that one wagers $110 to get a payoff of $210, which represents a $100 profit.

=== Rolling the winnings into the next wager ===
If the payoff from one match is treated as a wager in the next match, and so on, the ultimate payoff for winning a $100 parlay on N matches will be $100 × (210/110)^{N}, and the profit will be $100 less than that. If the actual probability of predicting each match correctly is 50% this gives the house an edge. However, if the probability of correctly predicting each match is better than 110/210 ≈ 52.38% then it is the bettor who has the advantage with moneyline odds of −110 for each match.

=== Vigorish as a percentage of profit ===
If the true odds of winning are 50% this is saying that a $110 wager should have paid $110 profit with fair odds, but only 100/110 ≈ 90.909% of that fair profit is given to the bettor. If that same 90.909% payout is applied to otherwise fair-odds parlay bets then the profit for a $100 wager will be $100 × (2^{N} − 1) × (100/110).

== See also ==
- Full cover bet
- Trixie (bet)
- Each-Way (bet)
- Progressive parlay
