= Bookmaker =

Organization or person that takes bets

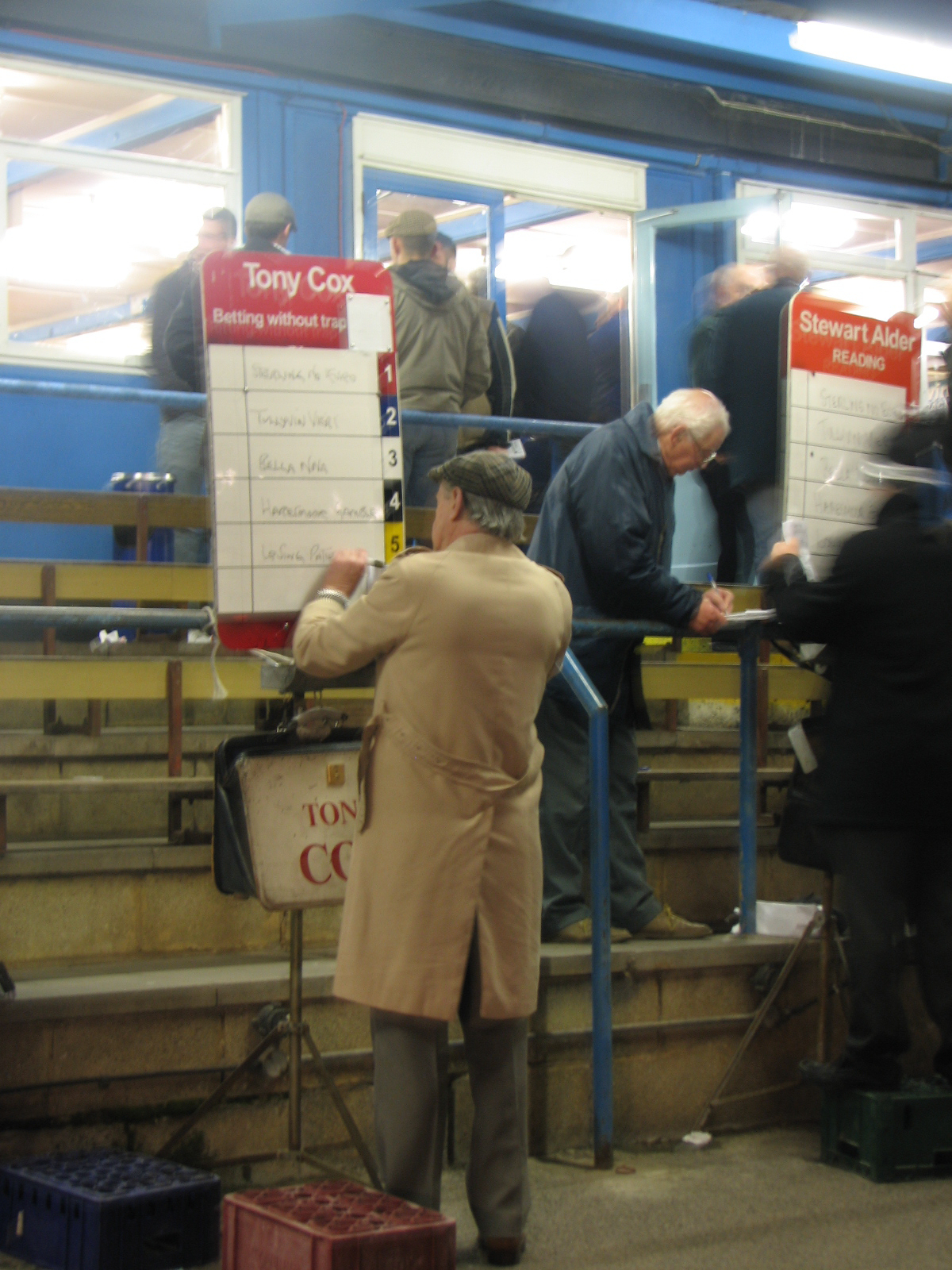
Bookmakers on a greyhound race course, Reading, Berkshire

A bookmaker, bookie or turf accountant is an organization or a person that accepts and pays out bets on sporting and other events at agreed-upon odds.

== History ==
The first bookmaker, Harry Ogden, stood at Newmarket in 1795, although similar activities had existed in other forms earlier in the eighteenth century.

Following the Gaming Act 1845, the only gambling allowed in the United Kingdom was at race tracks. The introduction of special excursion trains meant that all classes of society could attend the new racecourses opening across the country. Runners working for bookmakers would collect bets in clock bags. Cash flowed to the bookmakers, who employed bodyguards against protection gangs. Illegal betting shops were fined, but some, like Bella Thomasson, ran betting businesses that the police appeared to turn a blind eye to.

== Range of events ==
Bookmakers in many countries focus on accepting bets on professional sports, especially horse racing and association football or Indian Premier League cricket. However, a wider range of bets, including on political elections, awards ceremonies such as the Oscars, and novelty bets are accepted by bookmakers in some countries.

== Operational procedures ==
By "adjusting the odds" in their favour (paying out amounts using odds that are less than what they determined to be the true odds) or by having a point spread, bookmakers aim to guarantee a profit by achieving a 'balanced book', either by getting an equal number of bets for each possible outcome or (when they are offering odds) by getting the amounts wagered on each outcome to reflect the odds. When a large bet comes in, a bookmaker may also try to lay off the risk by buying bets from other bookmakers. Bookmakers do not generally attempt to make money from the bets themselves but rather by acting as market makers and profiting from the event regardless of the outcome. Their working methods are similar to those of an actuary, who does a similar balancing of financial outcomes of events for the assurance and insurance industries.

== Gambling industry by country ==
=== United Kingdom ===
In 1961, Harold Macmillan's Conservative government legalised betting shops, with tough measures intended to ensure that bookmakers remained honest. A large industry has grown since. At one time, there were over 15,000 betting shops. Consolidation reduced that number to between 9,100 and 9,200 by 2013. This number has reduced further to 6,219 as of March 2022, largely as a result of Covid-19 and the forced closure of shops on the UK high street. The largest bookmakers in the country, known as the "Big Three", are William Hill, Ladbrokes, and Coral.

The United Kingdom's Gambling Act 2005 introduced a new regulatory system for governing gambling in Great Britain. This system includes new provisions for regulating the advertising of gambling products. These provisions of the Act came into effect in September 2007. It is an offence to advertise in the UK, gambling that physically takes place in a non-European Economic Area (EEA) or, in the case of gambling by remote means, gambling that is not regulated by the gambling laws of an EEA state. The Gambling Commission is the body that makes sure all sites and operators follow the new restrictions. In addition to the Gambling Act of 2005, according to the new gambling bill, online gambling sites are only allowed to offer services within the United Kingdom, if they are registered at the UK Gambling Commission.

Improved TV coverage and the modernisation of the law have allowed betting in shops and casinos in most countries. In the UK, on-track bookies still mark up the odds on boards beside the racecourse and use tic-tac or mobile telephones to communicate the odds between their staff and to other bookies, but, with the modernisation of United Kingdom bookmaking laws, online and high street gambling are at an all-time high. A so-called super-casino had been planned for construction in Manchester, but the government announced that this plan had been scrapped on 26 February 2008.

=== Germany ===
The law on betting on horse racing and lotteries was passed by the German legislature and came into force on 1 July 2012. Since then, a tax of 5% of the bet must be paid to the tax authorities for all sports betting (offline and online). This affects the entire sports betting market in Germany.

Many of the bookmakers are sponsoring some of the major football teams in the major European football leagues, although Werder Bremen are currently fighting the German courts for the freedom to continue featuring bookmaker Bwin on their shirts, as Germany and France take action against online gamers. For example, as of 1 January 2020, bettors in Germany will not be able to bet more than €1,000 a month in accordance with the latest amendment of the ITG. New online sportsbook laws are expected shortly in Germany, as this law is only temporary: the expiration date was set to be on 20 June 2020.

=== Canada ===
The fundamental law governing gambling activities in Canada is the federal Criminal Code (the "Code"). Sections 201 to 206, including section 206, make all types of gambling, betting and lotteries illegal throughout Canada with very limited exceptions, such as betting-mutuel on horse racing (provided for in section 204). While the federal Code is the applicable prohibitionist law, all regulations (and regulatory bodies) are provincial, with one exception: pari-mutuel betting on horse racing, which is regulated by the federal Canadian agency Pari-Mutuel.

=== United States ===
Attempts to restrict operators of foreign gambling websites from accessing their domestic market resulted in a 2007 ruling against the US government by the World Trade Organization. However, common online gambling laws in the United States still don't exist – it differs from state to state. All forms of online gambling are illegal within the states of Utah and Hawaii, while the states of Delaware, Pennsylvania and New Jersey took a different approach: almost all forms of online gambling are legal in these states. These are the only US states where online casino sites can be legally registered. It is important to mention that Native Americans have their own gambling legislation: the Indian Gaming Regulatory Act of 1988. However, they need their state's approval to be able to offer their services online.

The Supreme Court overturned the federal ban on online gambling in 2018. However, while online gambling and casinos are legal, each state has its own rules. In Pennsylvania and New Jersey, the legal bookmakers are DraftKings, FanDuel and Pointsbet. Mississippi, New Jersey, Delaware, Nevada and West Virginia are on the road to legalisation, but Nevada and New Jersey have already passed laws. Most analysts predict the trend towards legalization of online gambling will continue in more and more US states.

=== Australia ===
Some bookmakers have taken to using betting exchanges as a way of laying off unfavourable bets and thus reducing their overall exposure. This has led to insecurity from some TABs in Australia, state-run betting agencies that attempted to deny Betfair an Australian licence by running unfavourable ads in the media regarding the company. When Tasmania granted Betfair a licence despite these efforts, the Western Australian state legislature passed a law that specifically criminalised using betting exchanges from within the state; however, the law was later ruled to be unconstitutional. As a result, Internet gambling in Australia required a new legal framework. The Interactive Gambling Act 2001 regulates the online gambling market in Australia, together with all its amendments. The last amendment was introduced on 13 September 2017. This bill states that online casinos, online poker and live betting are illegal in Australia. The Australian Communication and Media Authority (ACMA) is the regulatory body responsible for the supervision of all online gambling activities. Online sports betting is legal, however.

=== France ===
Online sports betting in France is divided into two sections: Autorité de Régulation des Jeux en Ligne (ARJEL) regulates online sports betting, while online horse betting is regulated by the law "Decree 2010-498 from 17 May 2010. International bookmakers are allowed to enter the French market, thanks to the Law No. 2010-476 from 12 May 2010.

== Internet gambling ==
With the increasing number of online betting exchanges, betting exchanges are now providing free bet offers in an attempt to lure customers away from the competition. These free bets are generally based on the size of the deposit made into the gambling account. For example, if a customer deposited £20, the betting exchange would deposit an additional £20 for the customer to use. Free bet rules vary depending on the betting exchange.

== Sponsorships ==
Most televised sports in the United Kingdom and the rest of Europe are now sponsored wholly or partly by Internet and high street bookmakers, with sometimes several bookmakers and online casinos being displayed on players' shirts, advertising hoardings, stadium signs and competition event titles. Sponsors are especially highlighted in the football category since football fans present a significant percentage of the bookmakers' target group.

With the recent banning of tobacco sponsorship and the significant commercial budgets available to the gaming industry, sponsorship by car manufacturers, alcoholic drinks, soft drinks and fast-food marketers is being rapidly replaced by sponsorship from gaming companies in the Far East and Europe.

== See also ==
- Bookies – a German film
- Betting shop
- Fixed odds betting terminal
- Fixed-odds gambling
- Glossary of bets offered by UK bookmakers
- History of gambling in the United Kingdom
- List of bookmakers
- Match fixing
- Organized crime
- Mathematics of bookmaking
- Numbers game
- Off-track betting
- Parlay
- Point shaving
- Problem gambling
- SP bookmaking
- Sports betting
- Sportsbook
- Vigorish
