= Even money =

Bet that can lose or win the same

Even money is a wagering proposition with even odds—the bettor stands to lose or win the same amount of money. Beyond gambling, even money can mean an event whose occurrence is about as likely to occur as not. Even money is also known as 50–50.

In professional gambling, even money bets typically do not have odds that are indeed 50–50. Therefore, successful gamblers have to examine any bets they make in light of the odds really being even money. For example, in roulette, betting on red or black is an even money bet. However, the presence of the green 0 and the 00 means that statistically the bettor will lose more than 50% of the time. There are variations of the game that offer en prison on 37 number tables so if a 0 is rolled, the bettor neither wins or loses but his or her bet rides again on the next roll; if the bet-upon event occurs on the second spin, the even-money wager is returned to the bettor. There still is not a 50-50 chance of winning, but a lot closer, since the house edge is reduced by almost 50%.

In blackjack, even money bet is a side bet offered to a player that has a blackjack (an Ace and a ten-valued card) in case the dealer has an Ace as a face-up card. This bet costs half the size of the original bet. Even money bet protects the player from a push if the dealer has a blackjack. In case the dealer does have a blackjack, the player will push on the original bet and get a 2 to 1 payout on the even money side bet. However if the dealer does not have a blackjack, the player will be paid 3 to 2 on the original bet and lose the even money bet. Mathematically, requesting "even money" on a natural on a table that pays 3:2 for a natural is the same as an insurance bet since the 50% bonus is being used to buy the insurance.
