= JenningsBet =

British bookmaker chain

- Type: Private
- Industry: Gambling
- Founded: 1961
- Founder: Greg Knight and Julian Knight
- Key people: Greg Knight (CEO)
- Products: Sports betting, horse racing betting
- Website: jenningsbet.com

JenningsBet is a British bookmaker operating licensed betting shops throughout the United Kingdom. Founded in 1995, the company operates retail betting outlets offering sports betting and horse racing.

== History ==
JenningsBet was established in 1961 by Greg and Julian Knight following the demerger of Jennings Bookmakers founded by their grandfather. The company expanded through the acquisition of independent betting shops and regional bookmakers. Greg Knight became the sole owner of JenningsBet in 2021.

The company has completed additional acquisitions of independent betting businesses as part of its retail expansion strategy.

JenningsBet operates licensed betting offices across England and Wales, providing over-the-counter betting on horse racing and other sporting events. By June 2026, JenningsBet operated 212 betting shops.

The company has been cited in reporting on the British retail betting industry, particularly regarding independent bookmakers, betting-shop regulation, taxation, and gambling policy.

== Business ==
JenningsBet is the trading name of Betting Shop Services Ltd and its subsidiaries Jennings Racing Ltd, Betting Shop Operations Ltd, Megabet UK Ltd and Mark Jarvis Ltd. It is a high-street business and does not operate online.

Its growth contrasts with the national trend. Gambling Commission figures showed retail betting yield down 18% year on year in the final quarter of 2025. Owner and chief executive Greg Knight has highlighted that, although overall retail betting gross gambling yield declined between 2018-19 and 2024-25, the reduction in betting-shop numbers was accompanied by a 16% rise in average yield per shop. Knight has also said rising media-rights fees are making horse racing a costly product for bookmakers to support.

== See also ==
- Bookmaker
- Betting shop
- Gambling in the United Kingdom
