= Manor House Stables =

Racing stable in Cheshire, England

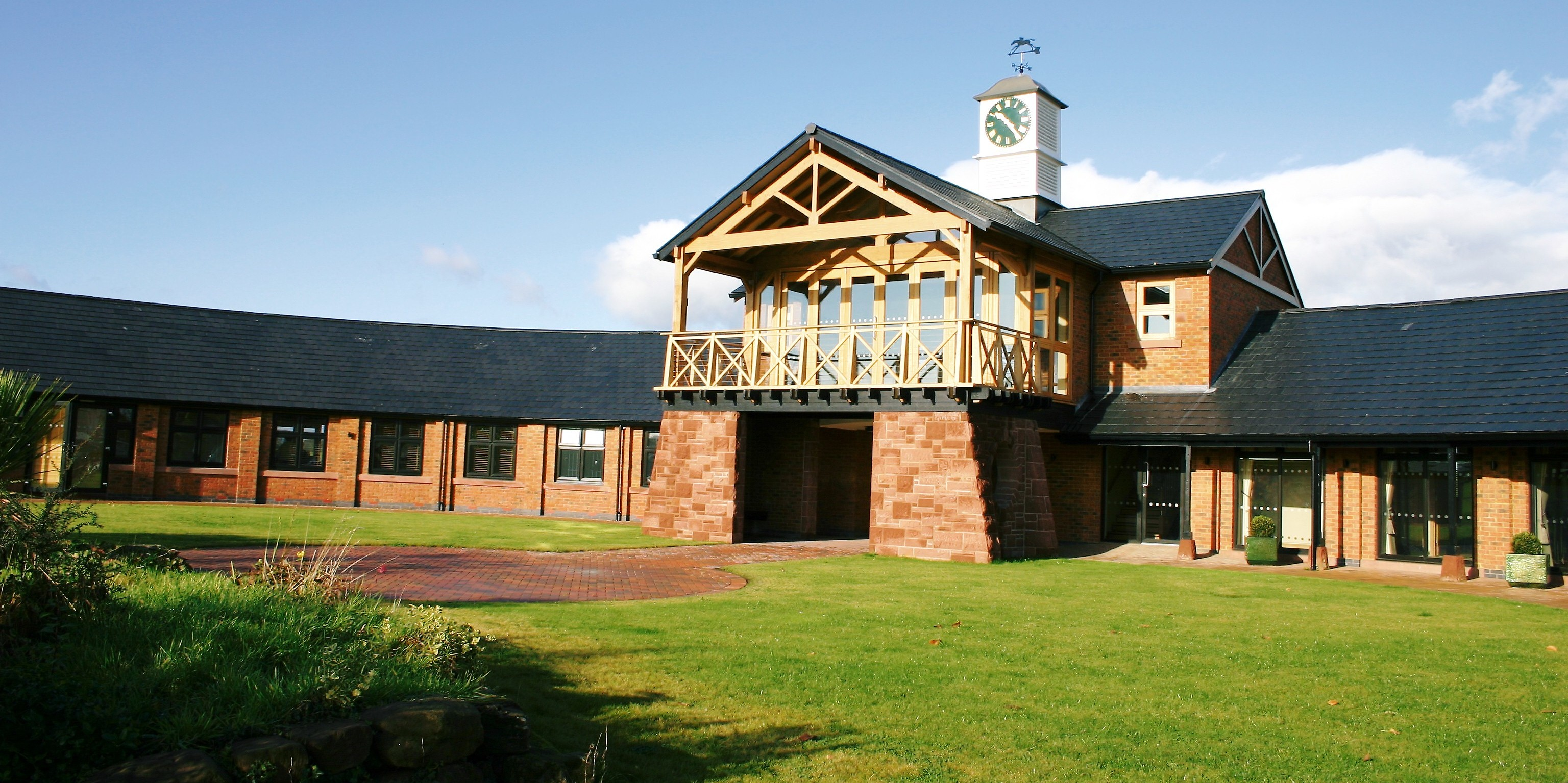
- Company type: Thoroughbred racing stable
- Genre: Professional sports
- Founded: 2006
- Founder: Michael and Louise Owen
- Headquarters: Malpas, United Kingdom
- Key people: Tom Dascombe, trainer (2009-2021); Hugo Palmer, trainer (2022-present)
- Owner: Michael Owen and Andrew Black
- Website: http://www.manorhousestables.com/

Manor House Stables is a thoroughbred horse racing establishment situated in Cheshire, England from where racehorse trainer Hugo Palmer currently operates.

The stable, converted from a cattle barn by Michael Owen and his wife Louise, began operating as a training establishment in March 2007 with 30 horses in training.

In July 2009, Betfair co-founder Andrew Black was approached to become joint owner of Manor House Stables LLP. The completion of this deal enabled the company to secure the services of successful racehorse trainer Tom Dascombe, who as of March 2010 had over 100 horses in training at the stable.

On 14 September 2014 Brown Panther recorded the stable's first Group 1 victory in the Irish St. Leger.

Owen ended the partnership with Dascombe in December 2021 and Hugo Palmer took over as trainer in 2022.
