= Mobile gambling =

Gambling on a mobile device

Mobile gambling refers to playing games of chance or skill for money by using a remote device such as a tablet computer, smartphone or a mobile phone with a wireless internet connection. Over a hundred mobile casinos were operating as of December 2013, with most of the big casino operators in gambling now providing a mobile platform for their player base. Mobile gambling has grown rapidly with the development of HTML5 technology and widespread smartphone adoption, enabling users to access casino games, sports betting, and lotteries through mobile apps or responsive websites.

== Market ==
In 2003, The Mobile Lottery launched in the United Kingdom as the first mobile gambling venture in the country. After wireless gambling on casino grounds was legalized in June 2005, in March 2006, the Nevada Gaming Control Board "cleared the way for businesses to propose ways in which establishments can offer wireless gambling."

In 2006, Europe was the largest market for mobile gambling, but "telecommunications analysts predict that Asia will catch up soon." At the time, a limitation of suitable phones in Asia and unclear legal situations in certain locales was limiting growth, with legal mobile gambling in Asia restricted to Hong Kong and China for sports and lotteries. Only in the Philippines and Macau was casino-style mobile gambling allowed. There were analyst projections in 2006 that the mobile gambling market in the Asia-Pacific region would generate revenue of $3 billion in 2010. In 2005, Jupiter Research forecast that global mobile gambling services would generate revenues of more than $19.3 billion US dollars by 2009. In 2010, Gartner analysts showed the 2009 global mobile gambling revenues at $4.7 billion and forecast $5.6 billion for 2010. Such a large discrepancy between the 2005 forecast and the 2009 reality was attributed to the unexpected 2006 US prohibition of all internet based gambling.

The mobile gambling market, as of 2011 is still in flux. The European Union still does not have a unified mobile gambling legislative framework in place. Each European country has their own set of widely different laws which regulate mobile gambling ranging from Finland where a government monopoly operates internet casinos to Norway which is in favor of complete prohibition of online gambling.

=== Market projections ===
A 2010 Gartner forecast 2014 global mobile gambling revenues reaching $11.4 billion. Final revenues proved in excess of projects within the year. In early 2011, Apple had allowed real-money gambling apps for the first time into the App Store, with mobile gambling revenue in the UK rising from £19 million in 2009 to £41 million in 2010. In June 2011, The Guardian wrote a story about spiking mobile gambling figures released by gambling companies Paddy Power, Corcoran, and Betfair, with Paddy Power saying its mobile gambling revenues had increased by 300% during 2010. Likewise, Betfair's and Corcoran's mobile user increases were also attributed to the increased adoption of apps.

=== More recent legalization ===
Growth of mobile betting in the United States was slowed in 2011, when the DOJ ruled against it, although successful services had been launched in Nevada and New Jersey. In 2012, there was a push for south Jersey to allow gamblers to use mobile devices to gamble in casinos, pushed by Senator Jim Whelan, to compete with Las Vegas. At the time, mobile gaming devices were already adopted in Las Vegas in casinos, allowing casinos to extend gaming floor to their outer premises. In 2012, the New Jersey Legislature approved "the use of hand-held gambling devices at Atlantic City casinos," and was waiting on the Governor's signature to pass.

In March 2019, the governor of Rhode Island signed a bill to allow mobile sports betting in the state, to begin on 1 July. Gina Raimondo's proposed budget estimated $3 million from mobile gaming profits that year. With Rhode Island the only state to allow sports betting at that time, the bill was approved on 12 March 2019, and allowed for the creation of an app to allow remote placing of sports bets at Twin River Casino. The state had legalized sports betting the year before, when the U.S. Supreme Court struck down a federal law forbidding most sports gambling in the country.

On 19 February 2020, it was reported that New Jersey had collected $837 million from general sports gamblers who were coming from New York state, both mobile and in-person, and that as a result, New York politicians were pushing for a bill that would legalize mobile gambling in New York with a 12.5% tax for each bet placed.

In September 2019, the Wall Street Journal reported that online gamblers accounted for "80% of all legal wagers on games in New Jersey, which surpassed Nevada for the first time in May in monthly sports bets." At the time, online or mobile gambling was in five states for sports gambling: New Jersey, Pennsylvania, West Virginia, Iowa and Nevada. It was reported that in its first year of legalization, "New Jersey sports bettors wagered a total of $3.2 billion in the first year," with $2.4 billion of that from online or mobile bets. In some states, like Mississippi, gamblers could place bets on a phone while physically inside the associated casino.

== Mobile sports betting ==
Reuters noted that as mobile gambling increased in popularity, there were increased corruption concerns about using phone hacking to game the system. Sports betting is the activity of predicting sports results and placing a wager on the outcome. The frequency of sports bet upon varies by culture, with the vast majority of bets being placed on association football, American football, basketball, baseball, hockey, track cycling, auto racing, mixed martial arts, and boxing at both the amateur and professional levels.

Reuters also highlights the challenges and increased governmental scrutiny associated with the expansion of mobile gambling. Concerns regarding rising rates of addiction and money laundering have led to the implementation of stricter regulations in certain jurisdictions, such as Australia. To mitigate fraudulent activities and encourage responsible gambling, operators increasingly utilize technologies including artificial intelligence. Concurrently, various US states have enhanced regulatory frameworks to ensure that providers adhere to rigorous standards for responsible gaming and player protection.

== Mobile casino games ==
Full legalized gambling on mobile phone is referred to as iGaming or iGambling. According to The Jerusalem Post, examples of common mobile gambling games include slot games, table games, new games, and classics like roulette, blackjack, poker, and baccarat. There are also live casino versions that are streamed from real casinos or studios. According to a February 2010 comScore MobiLens study of the U.S. mobile gaming market, smartphone subscribers are much more likely to play mobile casino games than subscribers of generic phones. The study revealed that 7.6% of smartphone subscribers and 1.2% of generic mobile subscribers played mobile casino games within a three-month time frame.

Aside from availability online, United States of America-based mobile casino apps have appeared in several land-based locations that can be utilized to gamble only while physically present on the casino's property. This extends to outside areas that are still within the boundaries of the property, making them the first type of slot machine, sports-betting, and random number generated gambling to take place legally off the licensed gaming floor while still inside a U.S. casino.

According to VentureBeat, Google does not allow any real-money gambling apps on its Google Play Store.

== See also ==
- Online gambling
- Gambling
