= Family Card =

Social safety net program in Bangladesh

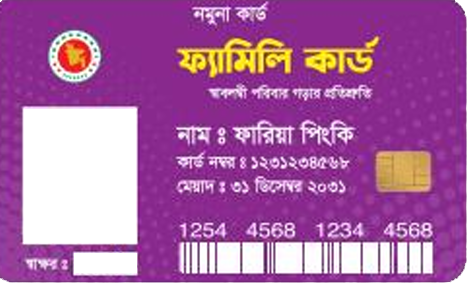
- Sample family card
- Motto: Not the individual, The family is the primary unit of development
- Type of project: Digital social safety net
- Country: Bangladesh
- Ministry: Ministry of Social Welfare
- Launched: 10 March 2026; 4 months ago
- Status: In pilot phase
- Website: familycard.gov.bd

The Family Card (Bengali: ফ্যামিলি কার্ড) is a digital social safety net program introduced by the Ministry of Social Welfare of the Government of Bangladesh. The program aims to bring poor and low-income families under a single unified database to provide direct financial and food assistance.

On 10 March 2026, Prime Minister Tarique Rahman officially inaugurated the program at the T&T field adjacent to the Korail slum in Dhaka. This initiative was a primary commitment in the election manifesto of the Bangladesh Nationalist Party (BNP).

== Background ==
Social safety nets in Bangladesh have historically been managed in a fragmented manner across various ministries. By 2025, it was observed that over 100 social protection programs were active under approximately 25 ministries, with a budget allocation of nearly 1.9 percent of the GDP. However, this system suffered from structural weaknesses, data duplication, and high exclusion rates of the actual poor. Various studies indicated that about 22 to 25 percent of the truly impoverished were excluded from any government benefits, while in many cases, affluent individuals were enjoying multiple benefits.

Following the COVID-19 pandemic in 2020 and the subsequent Russo-Ukrainian war and global inflation, low and lower-middle-income families faced severe economic pressure. Specifically, the rising prices of essential commodities made life difficult for the general public.

== Objectives ==
The core philosophy of the Family Card program is "The family, not the individual, is the primary unit of development."

- Women's empowerment: The card is primarily issued in the name of the mother or the female head of the household. This increases women's decision-making power, and makes them economically self-reliant.
- Unified digital platform: The government aims to bring various existing cash allowances (such as elderly allowance, widow allowance, and disability allowance), and the subsidized product assistance of the Trading Corporation of Bangladesh under a single card. It is expected that administrative waste and prevent the same individual from receiving benefits from multiple programs will be reduced.
- Universal Social Identity Card: The long-term goal of the government is to transform this Family Card into a Universal Social ID Card by 2030.

== Technical infrastructure and innovation ==
The Family Card program is built entirely on modern digital technology. It is considered a significant step in the transition from Digital Bangladesh to Smart Bangladesh.

- Smart card technology: Each Family Card is a modern smart card utilizing contactless chips, QR codes, and Near-field communication technology.
- Dynamic Social Registry: The backbone of the Family Card is the "Dynamic Social Registry." It is a central digital database that is updated continuously. This system integrates citizens' National Identity Cards, birth registrations, electricity bills, land office records, and tax-related information. Changes in a family's socio-economic status are monitored through the DSR, and eligibility lists are reassessed accordingly. The World Bank approved a $3.9 billion project in 2025 aimed at strengthening this DSR and the social protection system.
- G2P payment system: Beneficiaries receive monthly cash assistance directly into their bank accounts or Mobile Financial Service accounts (such as bKash or Nagad). This system is known as the Government to Person payment. Through the iBAS++ system, these funds are deposited directly from the government treasury into the beneficiary's wallet.

== Selection and eligibility criteria ==
The beneficiary selection process for the Family Card is conducted through specialized software and a Proxy Means Test scoring method.

=== Priority groups ===
According to the policy, the following seven special categories of people receive priority in obtaining a Family Card:

Priority List
Sl.	Priority Group	Description
1	Landless and homeless	Those who do not own land or permanent housing.
2	Families with disabled members	Families with physically or mentally challenged members.
3	Hijra and Bedey communities	Socially backward and marginalized populations.
4	Ethnic minorities	Families belonging to small ethnic groups across the country.
5	Owners of 0.5 acres of land or less	Those with very little cultivable land.
6	Ultra-poor female-headed households	Abandoned or widowed women managing a family.
7	People in disaster-prone areas	Families affected by river erosion or natural disasters.

=== Ineligibility criteria ===
Certain families are excluded from these benefits:

- If any family member is a pensioner of a government or autonomous institution.
- If any family member is a government employee.
- Households using Air Conditioning or owning luxury assets (e.g., a car).
- Possession of savings certificates worth more than 500,000 BDT.
- If the female head of the household is a teacher or employee of an MPO-listed institution.

=== PMT scoring method ===
During data collection, indicators such as family size, housing status, type of floor, ownership of livestock, TV, refrigerator or laptop, and remittance flow are recorded. An engine in the central server of the Department of Social Services provides a score between 0 and 1000 based on this data. Only those with a score below 796 are considered eligible for the Family Card.

== Pilot project ==
Before the full nationwide rollout, a pilot project is being conducted from March to June 2026. In this phase, a total of 37,567 beneficiaries in 15 wards across 13 districts are being provided with cards.

=== Selected areas and allocation ===
The primary areas covered under the pilot project are:

- Dhaka: Korail Slum (Banani), Bhashantek Baganbari Slum.
- Khulna: Khalishpur Ward No. 10.
- Sylhet: Kulanj Union of Dirai Upazila in Sunamganj district (Uttar Suriyarpahar, Hatia Radhanagar, and Akilshah villages).
- Chittagong: Patiya and Rangunia.
- Others: Bhairab (Kishoreganj), Lalpur (Natore), Bogra Sadar, and Char Fasson (Bhola).

A total of 38.07 crore BDT was allocated for this pilot project, of which 66 percent is spent directly on cash assistance and the remainder on card production and data collection.

== Integration with previous programs ==
Previously, TCB distributed products to approximately 10 million families through handwritten cards. With the introduction of the Family Card, radical changes have been made to this TCB distribution system.

=== NID-based verification ===
When TCB began verifying its database of 10 million cards against NIDs, it was discovered that approximately 4.3 million cards had data discrepancies or involved multiple cards taken using the same NID. These fake cards were canceled, and 5.7 million authentic smart cards were prepared.

== Economic and social impact ==
The Family Card program is seen as a major financial commitment for the economy of Bangladesh. If 20 million families are provided with a monthly cash assistance of 2,500 BDT, the annual expenditure would amount to approximately 60,000 crore BDT.

=== Positive impacts ===
As low-income families receive direct cash and essential food items at affordable prices, their nutritional gaps are being filled, playing a vital role in ensuring the country's food security. Additionally, the distribution of TCB products helps control hoarding and artificial price hikes by dishonest traders in the open market, helping to maintain overall market stability. Furthermore, the application of digital methods has reduced the scope for political influence or local nepotism, thereby increasing administrative transparency. Finally, as millions of poor women come under the umbrella of banking or mobile banking services, the scope of financial inclusion is expanding, and the quality of life for marginalized populations is improving.

=== Potential risks ===
Meeting the massive budget deficit of 60,000 crore BDT in national budget implementation is a challenge, as inflation risks may arise if funds are not sourced correctly. Additionally, errors often occur in measuring urban poverty because collecting accurate data for the urban floating poor and verifying their income sources is quite difficult. On the other hand, due to the technological divide, many people in rural areas are deprived of benefits like card activation because they are not skilled in using smartphones or apps. Above all, keeping this massive database updated annually and ensuring data accuracy to build a sustainable management system remains a long-term challenge.

== Administrative and management structure ==
The Family Card program is managed through a disciplined administrative structure extending from the field level to the center.

=== Five-tier committees ===
1. Cabinet Committee: The policy-making body led by the Finance Minister.
2. District Committee: Led by the Deputy Commissioner.
3. Upazila/City Committee: Led by the Upazila Nirbahi Officer or the Mayor of the City Corporation.
4. Union/Municipality Committee: Comprising local government officials.
5. Ward Committee: For data collection and the primary list.

A gazetted officer is in charge of supervision in each ward to ensure neutrality. An online Grievance Redress Mechanism has been developed to resolve beneficiary complaints.

== Future plans ==
Under Vision 2030, the government does not view the Family Card merely as a relief program but wants to develop it as a multi-purpose citizen service platform. Plans to integrate the following services with this card in the future include:

- Education Stipends: Distributing school or college stipends for children directly according to the family card database.
- Agricultural Subsidies: Providing funds for fertilizer, seeds, and electricity assistance to marginal farmers through the Family Card.
- Health Insurance: Ensuring specialized medical services at low or no cost for cardholding families.
- Disaster Relief: Sending rapid assistance via the G2P method to those affected during natural disasters like floods or cyclones.
