= Paddy Power =

Irish betting company

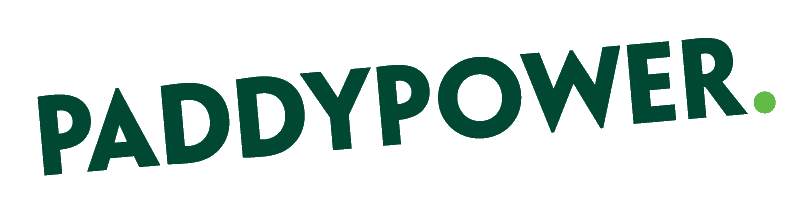

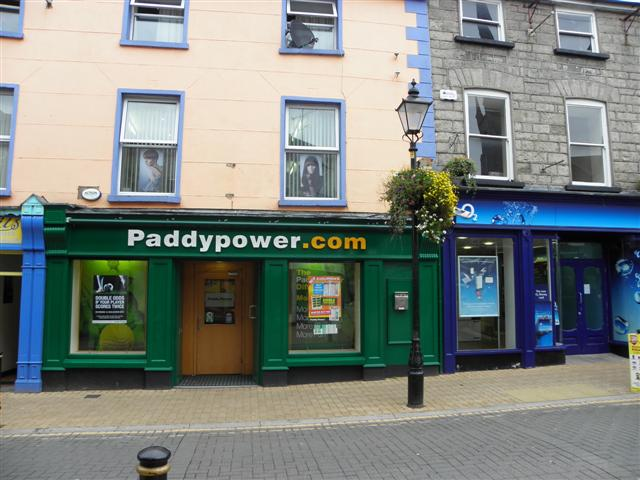
- Paddy Power, Monaghan
- Type: Subsidiary
- Industry: Gambling
- Founded: 1988; 38 years ago
- Founders: David Power; John Corcoran; Stewart Kenny
- Headquarters: Dublin, Ireland
- Key people: John A. Bryant (chairman); Peter Jackson (CEO)
- Parent: Flutter Entertainment
- Website: www.paddypower.com/bet

Paddy Power is an Irish gambling company founded in 1988. Its product offering includes sports betting, online casino, online poker, and online bingo. Business operations are led from its headquarters in Dublin, alongside a satellite office in Malta. In February 2016, Paddy Power merged with Betfair to create Flutter Entertainment.

== History ==
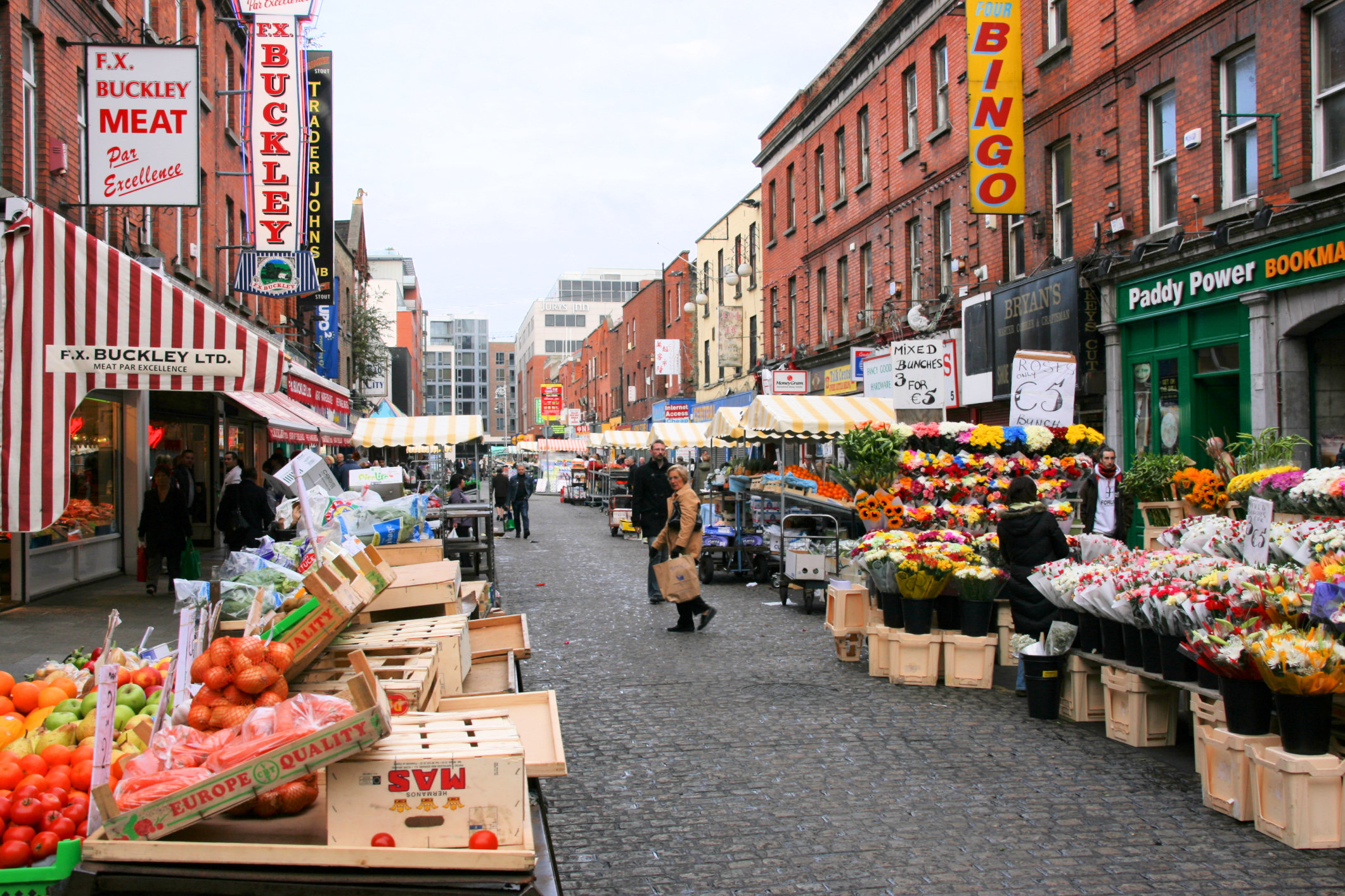
Paddy Power shop in Moore Street, Dublin (2007)

Paddy Power was founded in 1988 by a merger of the forty shops of three Irish bookmakers: Stewart Kenny, David Power, and John Corcoran. Stewart Kenny and Vincent O'Reilly had sold Kenny O'Reilly Bookmakers to Coral in 1986, and then opened ten shops of their own by 1988; Kenny was group CEO from 1988 to 2002, and chairman from 2002 to 2003. John Corcoran's shops had traded as Patrick Corcoran. David Power was a son of Richard Power and one of several inheritors trading under the Richard Power name. The Power name was considered the strongest brand among the merged shops, while the "Paddy" name and green colouring emphasised the chain's Irishness at a time when the fragmented Irish industry was facing competition from British betting chains entering the market in response to changes in the Irish tax code. David Power's son, whose name happens to be Paddy Power (b. 1974/5), is a marketing spokesman for the company.

== Expansion ==
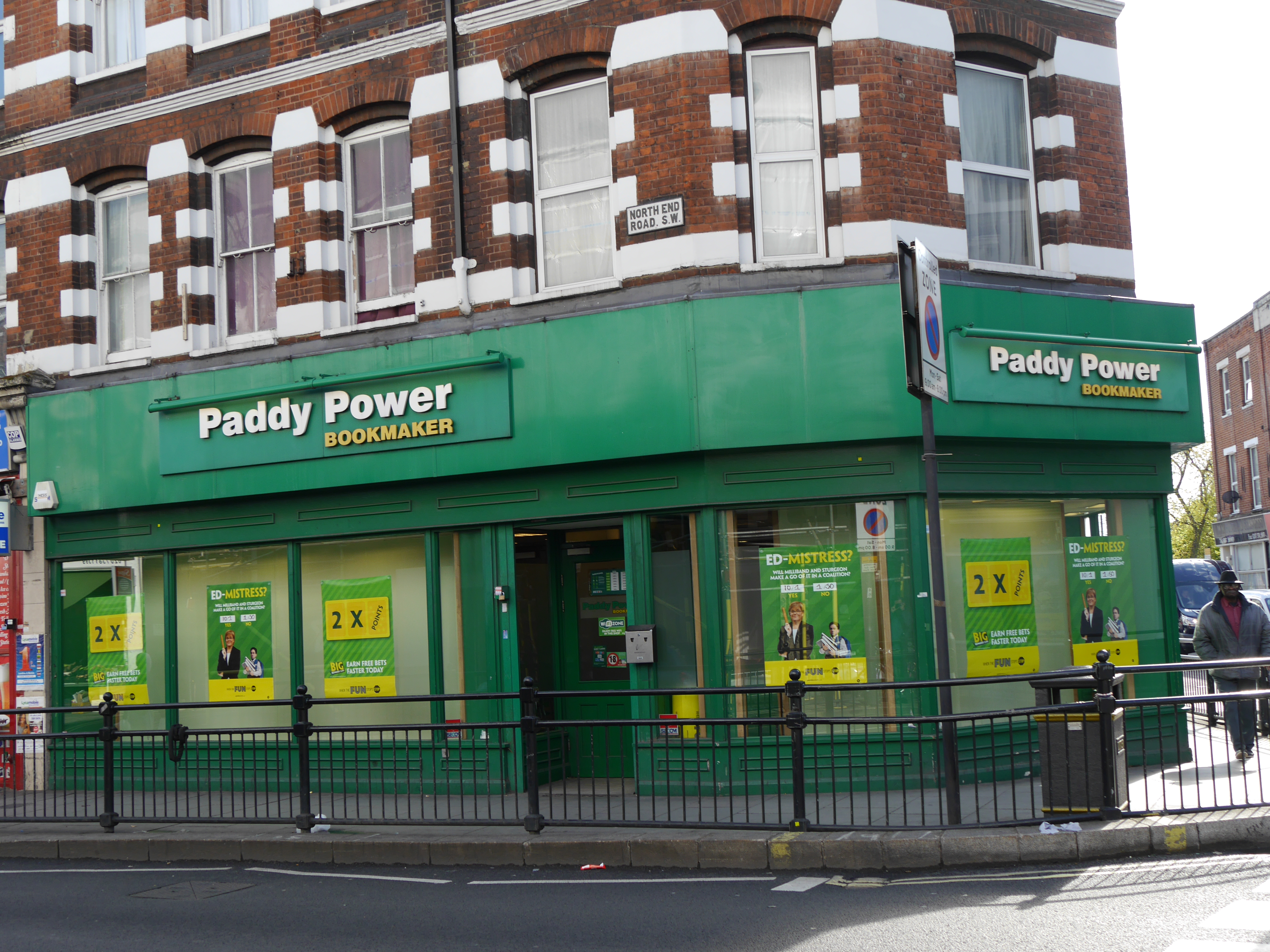
Paddy Power, North End Road, Fulham, London (2015)

Paddy Power had an aggressive expansion strategy involving opening prominent shops in most Irish towns, rather than side streets previously favoured. The firm's novelty bets broadened its media coverage beyond the horseracing news. Its share of the Irish off-course betting market grew from 8% in 1988 to 33% in 2001.

Power Leisure, the parent company of Paddy Power PLC, listed on the London Stock Exchange in December 2000, to fund an expansion in the UK.

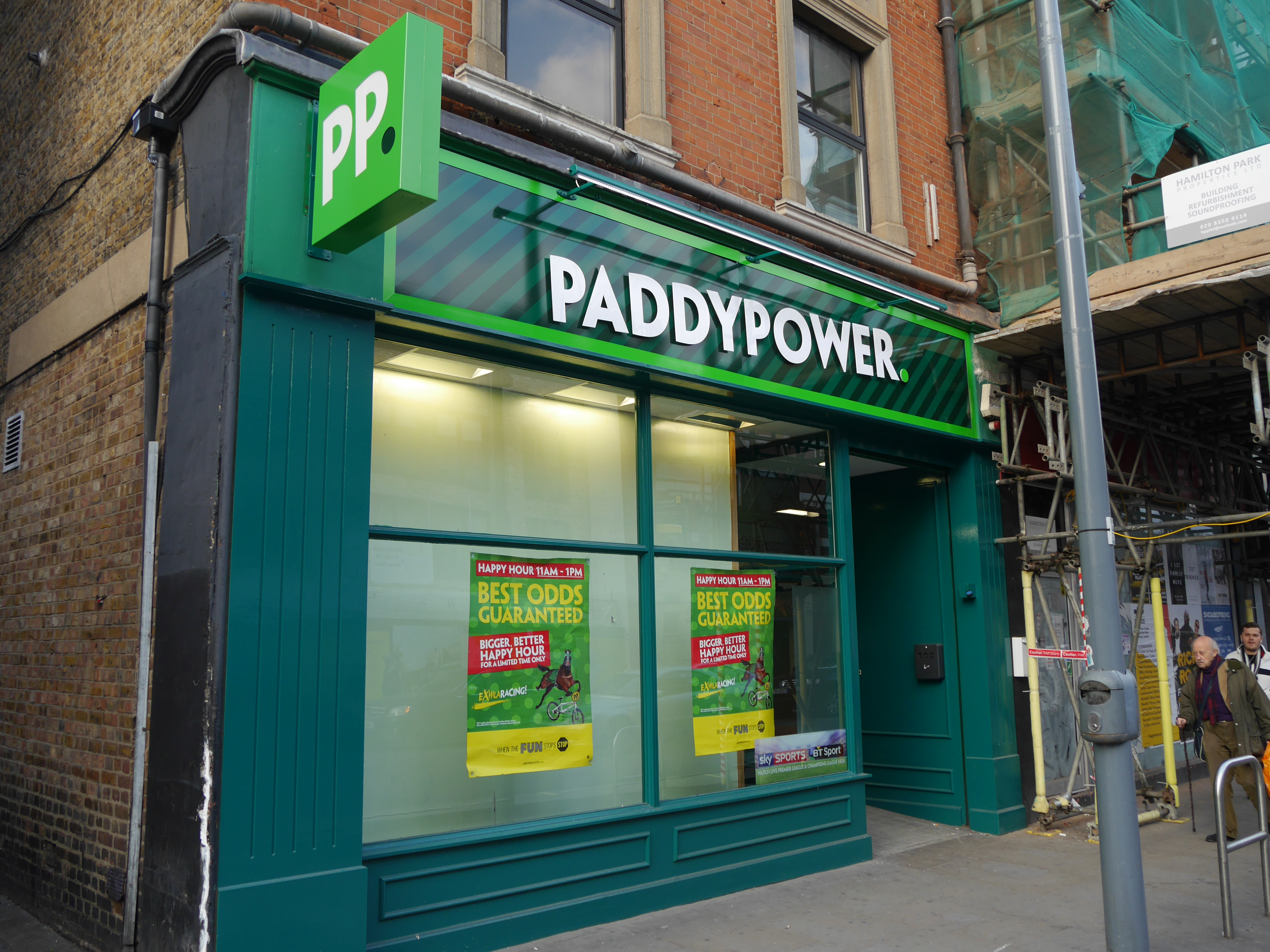
An outlet in Hammersmith, London

At the end of 2005, Paddy Power operated 195 outlets (150 in Ireland and 45 in the UK). The total number of employees was 1,374. On 27 May 2008, it acquired the Northern Irish independent bookmaker McGranaghan Racing, bringing its shop count to 191 in Ireland. In February 2010, the chain had 356 shops with 209 in Ireland, 8 in Northern Ireland and 139 in Great Britain.

The bookmaker is known for offering odds on controversial markets in order to garner publicity, e.g., in November 2008, 16–1 was laid that United States President Barack Obama 'would not finish' his first term (this was widely interpreted as his odds of assassination).

After English Premier League new entrants Stoke City lost their opening game of the 2008–09 season 3–1 to Bolton Wanderers, Paddy Power controversially paid out on bets on them being relegated. When the club finished in mid-table at the end of the season the company took out a full page advert in The Sentinel apologising to the club and its supporters.

In May 2010, Paddy Power acquired a majority stake in Australian bookmaker Sportsbet.com.au.

In July 2010, the company took the unusual step of refunding bets placed on Felipe Massa to win the 2010 Germany Grand Prix following the notorious "team orders" incident, which led to Fernando Alonso being allowed to win the race, despite Massa's clear lead.

In October 2011, the company paid out early on New Zealand winning the 2011 Rugby World Cup, four days before the final against France on 23 October 2011. The All Blacks were Paddy Power's 4/6 tournament favourites and were 1/9 odds on to win the final, with France at 13/2. The company boss said: 'New Zealand have left all of their opposition so far feeling black and blue and it's inevitable us bookies will be taking a hammering from them on Sunday too, so punters might as well collect now.' New Zealand did indeed go on to win the match.

As of November 2011, Paddy Power was the largest bookmaker in Europe by total share value. Its group income was €444m in 2010.

Paddy Power was placed 6th in the 2011 Management Today list of "Britain's Most Admired Companies".

Paddy Power and British rival Betfair agreed terms for a merger in September 2015. The transaction was structured as an acquisition of Betfair by Paddy Power and the enlarged entity, named Paddy Power Betfair, is based in Dublin. The merger was completed in February 2016.

Paddy Power CEO Andy McCue became COO of Paddy Power Betfair, with Breon Corcoran, CEO of Betfair, becoming CEO of the combined group and Paddy Power's Gary McGann becoming chairman. Andy McCue left the company in April 2016 to pursue other opportunities.

In February 2020, Paddy Power won the GGA London "Betting Shop Operator of the Year" award. In July 2021, it won for a second consecutive year.

In October 2025, it was announced that Paddy Power was to close 28 shops in the Republic of Ireland, one in Northern Ireland and 28 in Great Britain, with 247 people to be made redundant.

== Criticism ==
Paddy Power has drawn criticism for offering controversial markets, such as odds on the first species to be driven to extinction by the BP oil spill in the Gulf of Mexico, on a prospective assassination of United States President Barack Obama, and on the potential extinction of the polar bear in December 2009.

Paddy Power's advertising campaigns have also been criticised. One showed sight-impaired footballers kicking a cat, about which the Advertising Standards Authority (ASA) received 400 complaints. Another involved the model Imogen Thomas alongside a tagline using a double entendre. Paddy Power also received hundreds of complaints and was accused of transphobia by members of the LGBT community in February 2012 when the company released an advertising campaign to distinguish "the stallions from the mares" by placing transgender women in the crowds at the Cheltenham Festival. The ASA ruled that the advert could not be broadcast in the United Kingdom.

Additionally, the company has been criticised for not paying out on bets with large odds. In May 2009, when Shane Lowry won the Irish Open, it stated that it would not pay out on the 3000/1 odds which it had mistakenly offered and instead reached 'an arrangement' with the customers involved.

During a UEFA Euro 2012 match between Denmark and Portugal on 13 June 2012, Danish forward Nicklas Bendtner celebrated his second goal by lowering his shorts and lifting his shirt to reveal a pair of Paddy Power underpants, leading to criticism from the national team's sponsor Ladbrokes and tournament organisers UEFA. Bendtner was fined €100,000 by UEFA and banned for one game. He described his actions as being regrettable and not premeditated.

In early March 2014, 5,525 complaints, the most ever recorded, were made to the United Kingdom Advertising Standards Authority (ASA) via an online petition launched for Paddy Power to withdraw an offer for betting on the outcome of the South African trial of Oscar Pistorius for murder of his girlfriend. On 19 March 2014, the ASA upheld all 5,525 complaints that the advertisement was insensitive, made light of disability, the death of a woman and a murder trial, and brought advertising itself into disrepute. The advert was discussed on an episode of The Last Leg, where Adam Hills made an impassioned speech condemning it.

Prior to the 2014 FIFA World Cup, Paddy Power posted a photo on its Twitter account, sourced from Reddit, allegedly showing an overhead view of a Brazilian rainforest with the message "C'MON ENGLAND PP" spelled out by the former locations of trees that had been cut down. Following major criticisms over the advert from users, it was revealed on 8 June 2014 that the images were fake, and part of a campaign by Paddy Power to promote its anti-deforestation charity effort.

In July 2014, Paddy Power was criticised by the Information Commissioner's Office for its response to an incident in 2010, where a hacker was able to obtain personal information of more than 649,000 people from its website. The data included addresses, email addresses, phone numbers, dates of birth and security questions and answers. Paddy Power did not inform the Information Commissioner's Office until four years later.

In September 2017, Paddy Power offered odds on a dead footballer, Ugo Ehiogu, to become the new manager of Birmingham City F.C. The company said it had made an error. For the 2018 FIFA World Cup, Paddy Power was criticised for its controversial polar bear graffiti stunt, with a Russian polar bear being emblazoned with an England flag. Paddy Power claimed the stunt was to raise awareness of the plight of polar bears in the Russian Arctic.

In October 2018, Paddy Power Betfair received a £2.2 million fine from the UK Gambling Commission, after an investigation revealed that the company broke the commission's rules regarding social responsibility and anti-money laundering.

In December 2018, Paddy Power and William Hill faced further criticism after allegations that they allowed a gambling addict to wager thousands of pounds in stolen cash. Victims of the theft seek £965,000 from Paddy Power that has not been compensated after the previous fine from October of that year.

In May 2023, Paddy Power was fined £490,000 by The Gambling Commission for sending a promotional push notification to customers who had signed up to exclude themselves from gambling and inviting them to bet on a football match.
