= Tom Dascombe =

British racehorse trainer

Thomas Geoffrey Dascombe
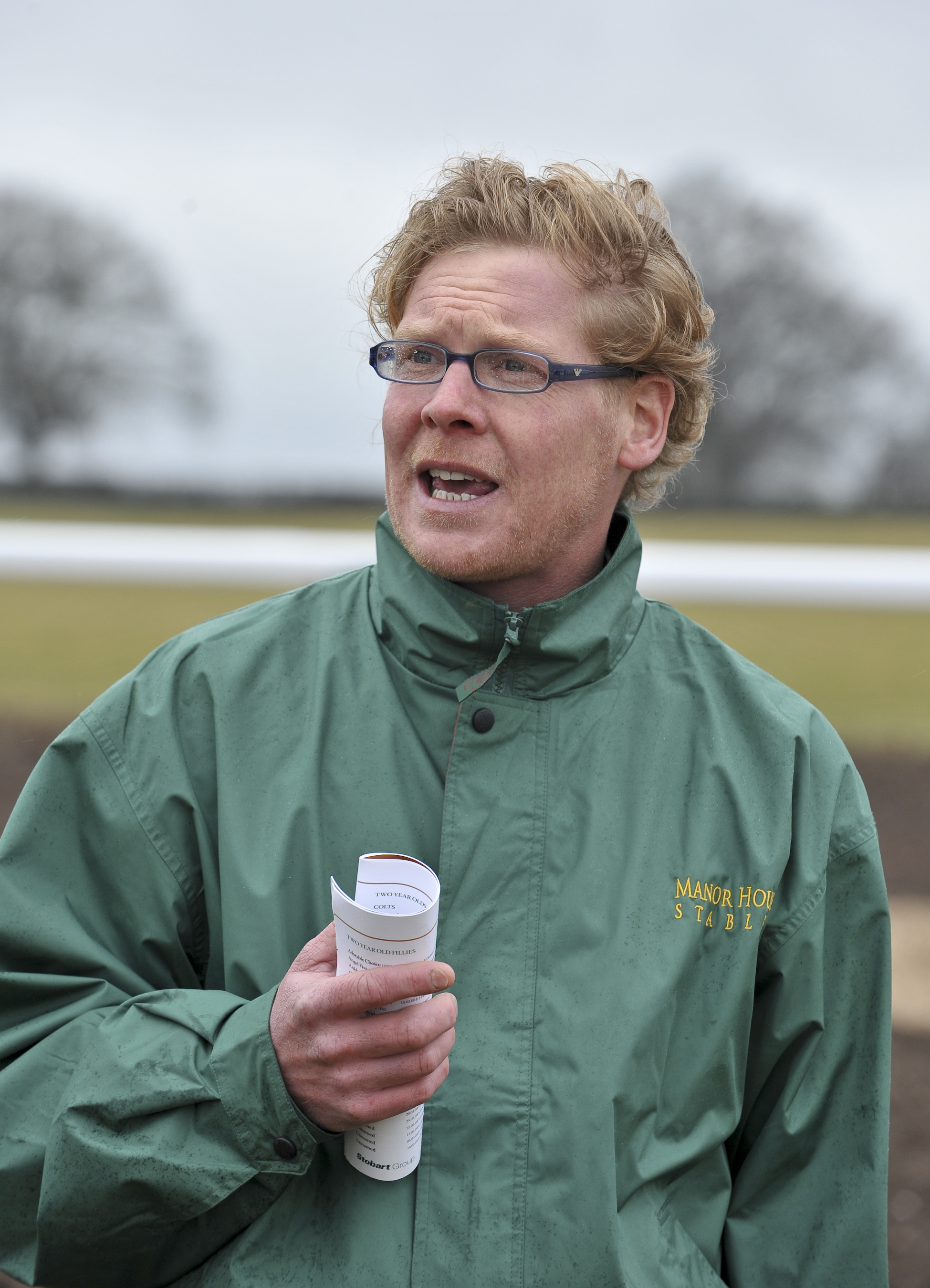

Personal information
- Born: 30 April 1973 (age 53) Bristol, United Kingdom
- Occupation: Trainer

Horse racing career
- Sport: Horse racing

Major racing wins
- July Stakes (2008); Superlative Stakes (2008); Queen Mary Stakes (2012); Irish St Leger (2014); Molecomb Stakes (2015)

Thomas Geoffrey Dascombe (born 30 April 1973) is an English Group 1 winning racehorse trainer currently operating from Uplands Stables, Lambourn, United Kingdom. He trained Classic Blade and Firth of Fifth to win the G2 July Stakes and G2 Superlative Stakes respectively, on consecutive days in 2008 at Newmarket. His more recent achievements include training two Royal Ascot winners in Rhythm of Light and Brown Panther on consecutive days of the Royal meeting in 2011 and at the same meeting in 2012 training Ceiling Kitty to win the Queen Mary Stakes. On 14 September 2014 he claimed his first Group 1 success when Brown Panther won the Irish St Leger for owners Michael Owen and Andrew Black.

== Early life ==
Born in Bristol, to Bill and Sue Dascombe, Dascombe first got his passion for horses watching the ITV Seven with his grandfather and dad. Tom began riding ponies at the age of three years.

== Career ==
Dascombe's first job in racing was for Henry Candy in Lambourn, but his sights were set on the top. "The other kids at school thought I was mad," he remembered. "As an armchair punter, I thought I knew everything, so I applied to join Martin Pipe – start at the top and work your way down."

Of his five years there, Dascombe said: "The one thing I learned – although I didn't appreciate it until I'd worked for others – is that his horses were never asked to do more than they were capable."

Having left Pipe's in 1995, Dascombe arrived in Lambourn as a freelance, riding out for five different trainers. "I got the message when, between them, they provided me with three rides in 18 months, so I started riding out for Ralph Beckett and, as he grew, I became his assistant."

After a year, Dascombe took three months off to go to America to think about his future and while helping break 80 yearlings in Florida, he realised that two-year-olds would be central to his future. His own training was completed by a stint with the top South African trainer, Mike de Kock.

== ONEWAY Racing ==
In 2005, Dascombe founded ONEWAY Racing in Lambourn, starting out with just a handful of horses. By 31 October 2009 he had sent out 130 flat winners in Great Britain from 818 runners, a strike rate of 16%.

== Manor House Stables ==
On 1 November 2009, Tom Dascombe officially began training from Manor House Stables, an establishment owned by Michael Owen and Andrew Black.

Dascombe hit up connections with jockey Richard Kingscote and retained him as Manor Houses stable jockey in which they have both had great success with over the years together.

Of the move, Dascombe commented "After four years training and running my own business in Lambourn I am delighted to have been given the opportunity of taking charge at Manor House Stables. At first, I was reluctant to give up my own business but as soon as I saw the facilities at Manor House Stables and felt the enthusiasm radiating from Michael Owen and Andrew Black when they described plans for future development I had no hesitation in accepting the appointment as a partner in their business and to move my training operation to Malpas."

Dascombe's first major successes at Manor House Stables came in 2011 at Royal Ascot when Rhythm of Light and Brown Panther (who later finished second in the 2011 St. Leger Stakes) won the Sandringham Listed Handicap and the King George V Handicap Stakes on consecutive days and in 2012 when Ceiling Kitty won the Group 2 Queen Mary Stakes at Royal Ascot. This was Dascombe's first Group success at Manor House Stables and his first since 2008. Dascombe's first Group 1 success came when Brown Panther won the 2014 Irish St Leger at The Curragh by 6½lengths. In 2015, Dascombe trained the promising Kachy to win the Group 3 Molecomb Stakes, who later went on to finish second in the Group 1 Commonwealth Cup.

Dascombe left Manor House Stables in March 2022 and relocated to Uplands Stables in Lambourn after Michael Owen announced the end of their owner-trainer partnership the previous December.

== Major wins ==
(Republic of Ireland) Ireland

- Irish St. Leger – Brown Panther (2014)
