= Independent Betting Adjudication Service =

Independent Betting Adjudication Service (IBAS)
- Company type: Adjudicator
- Industry: Gambling Dispute Resolution
- Founded: 1998
- Headquarters: United Kingdom
- Key people: Andrew Fraser, Chairman; Richard Hayler, Managing Director
- Website: ibas-uk.com

The Independent Betting Adjudication Service (IBAS), founded in 1998, is a third party organisation that settles disputes between gambling establishments registered with IBAS and their customers in the United Kingdom. The organisation, which was originally part of the Sporting Life's Green Seal service, was formerly known as the Independent Betting Arbitration Service. The Service dropped Arbitration from its name in 2007, opting instead to use Adjudication to better reflect its role after the enactment of the 2005 Gambling Act.

IBAS deals with several sectors in the realm of gambling. The sectors include:

- Betting Exchanges
- Betting Intermediaries
- Betting Shops
- Bingo Clubs
- Greyhounds
- Greyhound Stadia Pool Betting
- Lotteries
- Online Gambling (UK and Offshore)
- Gaming Machines
- Mobile Gambling
- Totalisator Betting

== Dispute involvement ==
Since its inception, IBAS has been handling the majority of gambling disputes in the UK. In 2000, the first year that IBAS was fully operational, approximately 800 disputes went to panel, a number which remained relatively constant the following year in 2001. In 2002, the number of cases to panel rose to 1126 due to the abolishment of the UK's gambling tax. Again, IBAS saw another increase in cases to panel, this time as a result of the 2005 Gambling Act. In 2007, nearly 1700 disputes were handled by the IBAS panel, 372 of which were of the internet variety. IBAS claims to have awarded customers over £365,000 from dispute resolutions in 2007. There are also instances when IBAS rules in favour of the establishment, rather than the customer. In the year ending 30 September 2025, only 1.7% (65 of 3,721) of customer complaints were upheld by IBAS.

IBAS will become involved in a dispute only after the gambling establishment and the customer(s) have made attempts to resolve the issue amongst themselves. If a deadlock remains, the dispute will be reviewed by IBAS if the following conditions are met:

- a resolution has not been reached to satisfaction of either party involved
- both parties agree to the terms and conditions of involving IBAS as a third party adjudicator

If the dispute warrants involvement, IBAS will accept written statements describing the conflict from both parties involved. IBAS verifies that the establishment has upheld its own rules and regulations regarding gambling. If no rule exists that covers the dispute, IBAS will establish its own rule based on what is considered acceptable by industry standards. Both parties are bound by IBAS's ruling.

== Gambling commission ==
One objective of the UK Gambling Commission is to ensure that all gamblers are treated fairly in accordance with the rules and regulations established for the gambling industry. This includes disputes between customers and gambling operators. By law, any sector in the realm of gambling under the jurisdiction of the Gambling Commission must use an independent, third party to resolve disputes. Because IBAS is recognised as the third party adjudicator for nearly all bookmakers in the UK, the Gambling Commission works closely with IBAS to reduce the number of disputes between customers and gambling operators.

== Case studies ==
From time to time, IBAS publishes a case study on one of their past rulings. These case studies provide gamblers with examples of previous disputes to help prevent future problems between gamblers and operators. The studies focus on aspects of gambling that are often confusing or misinterpreted. Case studies are available for several betting options offered to UK gamblers.

One football study published stated that all football bets are based on 90 minutes, unless otherwise specified by the use of the words outright, win trophy or another suitable phrase that leaves no doubt as to the preferred settlement criteria. Bettors need to specify which option they desire prior to placing the intended wager, otherwise, the bet is assumed to be based on 90 minutes of play.

== See also ==
- 2005 Gambling Act
- UK Gambling Commission
