= David Power (bookmaker) =

Irish bookmaker (1947–2024)

David Henry Power (16 January 1947 – 8 July 2024) was an Irish bookmaker.

Power's grandfather started bookmaking in Tramore, County Waterford in 1896, having earlier worked as a draper. The business passed to his son, Paddy, who died suddenly in 1963, leaving it to his son David. At 16, he was too young to take up the betting licence. Power completed his schooling at St Mary's College in Rathmines and studied accountancy at University College Dublin before taking over the family bookmaking firm in 1970.

In 1988, Power made a deal with fellow independent bookmakers Stewart Kenny and John Corcoran to merge their Irish betting chains to create the Paddy Power brand, initially with 40 outlets. The company was listed on the Dublin and London Stock Exchange in 2000. Power retired from the Paddy Power board in 2013. He suffered a severe medical emergency in December of that year, but recovered and continued on-course bookmaking until retiring after the Cheltenham Festival in 2018.

Power died on 8 July 2024, at the age of 77.
