= Gambling in the United Kingdom =

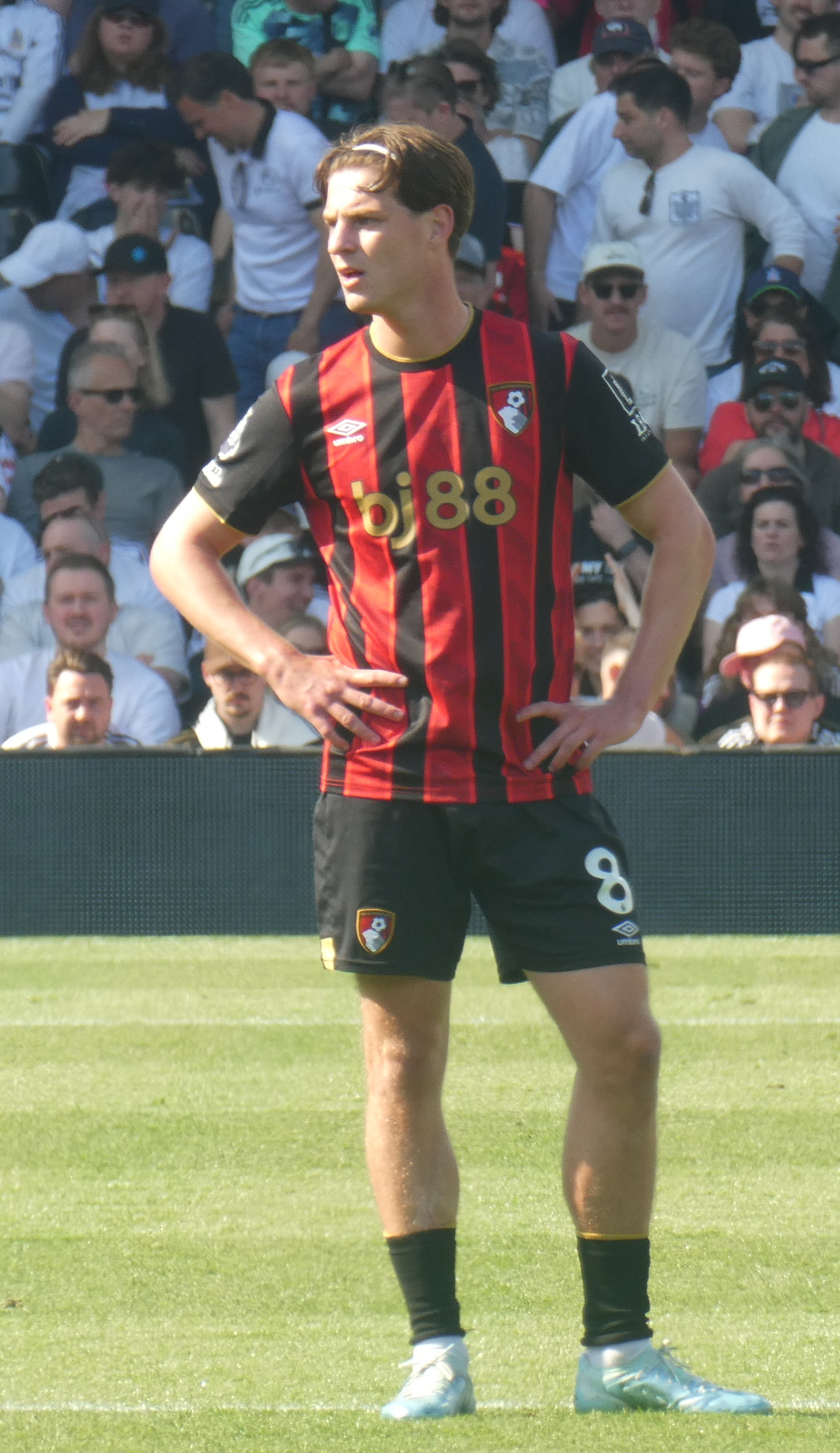
Many football teams have had gambling companies as their shirt sponsor in England. Here is Alex Scott wearing an AFC Bournemouth shirt advertising online casino bj88

Gambling in the United Kingdom is regulated by the Gambling Commission on behalf of the government's Department for Culture, Media and Sport (DCMS) under the Gambling Act 2005. This Act of Parliament significantly updated the UK's gambling laws, including the introduction of a new structure of protections for children and vulnerable adults, as well as bringing the burgeoning Internet gaming sector within British islands for the first time.

Gambling for centuries has been a main recreational activity in Great Britain. Horse racing has been a favourite theme for over three centuries. It has been heavily regulated. Historically much of the opposition comes from evangelical Protestants, and from social reformers.

On 8 December 2020, Nigel Huddleston MP announced a call for evidence to begin the Gambling Act Review. In July 2026, UK ministers began a crackdown on unlicensed casinos sponsoring sports teams. Liberal Democrat politicians called for a complete ban on sports betting and online casinos sponsorships in high-level UK sports competitions such as the English Premier League.

== History ==
Gambling for centuries has been a main recreational activity in Great Britain. Horse racing has been a favourite theme for over three centuries. The earliest recorded races were held at Chester in 1539. King Charles II was an avid sportsman who gave Newmarket its prominence – he was a jockey in 1671 and built a palace there for his convenience. Ascot Racecourse started in 1711 under the patronage of Queen Anne. By 1750 the Jockey Club was formed to control the Newmarket, preventing dishonesty, and making for a level field. The five classic races began with the St Leger Stakes in 1776. Epsom Derby began in 1780. The availability of railways facilitated the rapid growth of the sport, making travel easy for the horses and running specials that attracted large audiences. Gambling has been heavily regulated. Historically much of the opposition comes from evangelical Protestants, and from social reformers.

== Gambling forms ==
=== Bingo and casinos ===
The game of Housie was popularised in the armed forces in the Second World War and brought back to Britain after the end. The Betting and Gaming Act 1960 allowed commercial bingo halls to be set up, provided they were established as members-only clubs and had to get their take from membership fees and charges rather than as a percentage of the entry fees.

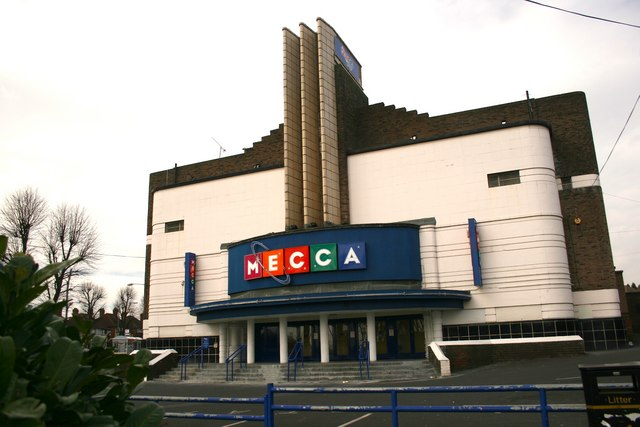
A Mecca bingo hall in Birmingham

Casinos had a similar history, with requirement for licensing from the Gaming Board of Great Britain and for casinos to be members only clubs. The number of gaming machines in casinos was limited at 10. The Casino Club Port Talbot in Wales – believed to be Britain's first legal casino – was established in 1961 by gambling mogul George Alfred James. James opened several casino-cum-cabaret and fine dining establishments in the 1960s, including the Charlie Chester Casino and Golden Horseshoe in London and the Kingsway and Grand Casino in Southport.

The Gaming Act 1968 (c. 65) liberalised the law, paving the way for more commercial casinos. The first very popular game was Chemmy, popularised by the Clermont Club, in London.

The Gambling Act 2005 paved the way for larger resort style casinos to be built, albeit in a controlled manner with one being built every few years until the Act is fully implemented. Many towns and cities bid to host one of these so-called "super casinos", which will be similar to those found in Las Vegas. On 30 January 2007 Manchester was announced as the winning bid to be the location of the first super casino. On 29 March 2007, the House of Lords urged the Government to review plans for the super casino in Manchester. Instead it supported plans for 16 smaller casinos, including ones in Solihull and Wolverhampton. In 2007, then Prime Minister Gordon Brown said that the Government would not be proceeding with the super casino in Manchester.

Gaming machines are divided into a number of categories, mainly depending upon the stakes and payouts involved, and whether there is an element of skill (these are known officially as AWPs or "Amusement with Prizes" machines).

=== Gambling on sports ===
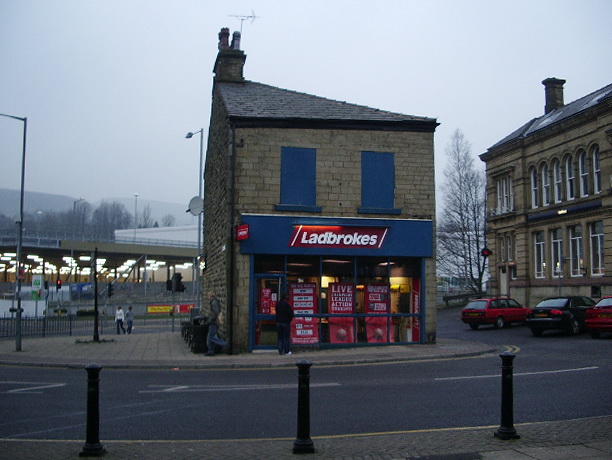
A Ladbrokes betting shop in Rawtenstall, Lancashire

Sports gambling has a long history in the United Kingdom, having been controlled for many decades, and more recently relaxed. The 1960 Act legalised off-course bookmakers. Pool betting on horses is a monopoly of The Tote. There are over 1,000 betting shops located in London.

There is a large market in the United Kingdom for gambling on competitive sports at bookmakers (betting shops) or licensed websites, particularly for horse, greyhound racing and football. The last of these also has an associated form of gambling known as the football pools, in which players win by correctly predicting the outcome of each week's matches.

The online sports betting market in the UK is estimated to be worth £650 million which has seen a compounding annual growth rate from 2009 to 2012 of approximately 7%. The total online gambling population in the UK is estimated at 2.1 million customers.

Sports gambling is advertised on television at times when children and young people are watching. There are calls for the government to control this. Dr Heather Wardle, a gambling behaviour expert from the London School of Hygiene and Tropical Medicine, said, "It’s hard to prove what harm is being done because it’s a generational thing and the harm comes much further down the line. We’re creating the conditions that normalise gambling for a generation". The gambling industry has announced voluntary curbs on television advertising. Stephen van Rooyen of Sky UK, maintains the TV ad ban is meaningless unless the industry also curbs advertising on other media. Rooyen stated, "The gambling industry are ignoring the fact they spend five times more on online marketing than they do on TV. By cutting TV ads, they’ll simply spend more online, bombarding people’s smartphones, tablets and social media feeds with even more gambling ads. A proportionate and responsible limit to gambling advertising across all media is the right thing to do". The voluntary reduction also does not prevent shirt sponsorship, ads that run around hoardings in stadiums, so that gambling firms will still feature prominently during live sport.

Simon Stevens, then-chief executive of the NHS, said in 2013 that he "disapproved of eight betting firms" because "they do not pay towards NHS costs in countering gambling addiction."

=== Lotteries ===
A statute of 1698 provided that in England lotteries were by default illegal unless specifically authorised by statute. The aim of the statute was that before the era of mass and efficient communications, those running national lotteries could claim to one part of the country that the winner lived in another, and do the same the other way: thus taking all the stakes and paying nothing out.

A 1934 Act legalised small lotteries, which was further liberalised in 1956 and 1976, but even then severely limited in the stakes, and the geographical scope that they could cover, so there could be no chance of the lottery organisers deceiving the bettors. There could be no big national lottery until the Government established one, however.

Other countrywide lotteries do exist, but work by dividing the prizes and stakes strictly on a geographical basis into small areas and thus technically not becoming a national lottery. The Gambling Commission called the Health Lottery in 2010 "a very fine line" and insisted it would only be legal if split into at least 31 separate, identifiable schemes so as not to become "a de facto National Lottery".

==== National Lottery ====
The United Kingdom's state-franchised lottery is known as the National Lottery, which was set up under government licence in 1993.

Several games are run under this brand, including Lotto and Thunderball. As with other lotteries players choose a set of numbers, say 6 from 59, with six numbers then being drawn at random. Players win cash prizes depending on how many numbers they match.

The National Lottery launched a pan-European "super-lottery", called EuroMillions, in 2004. Currently this is available in nine countries.

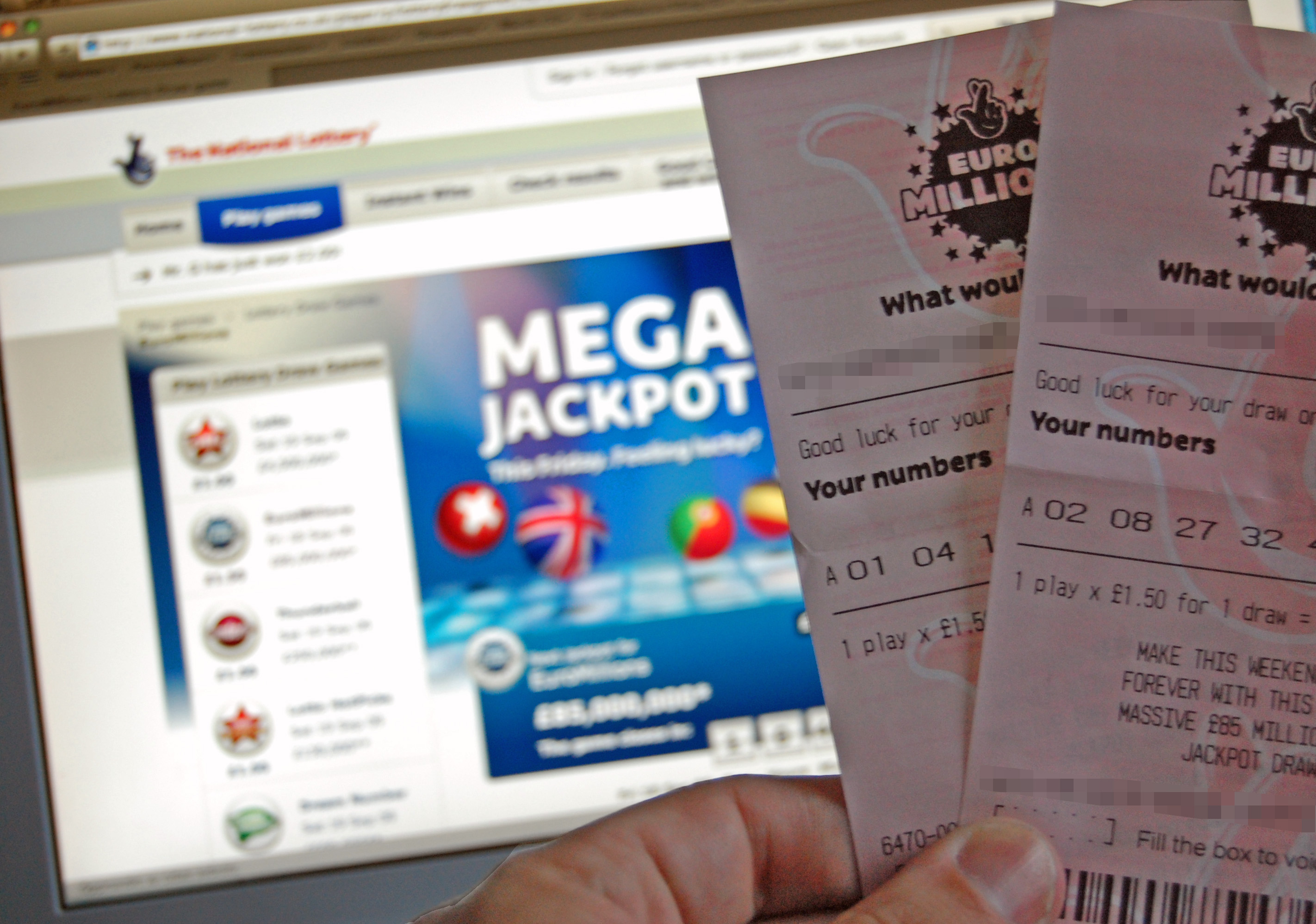
EuroMillions tickets

In the United Kingdom, the national lottery has so far raised several billions of pounds for Good Causes, a programme which distributes money via grants. 28% of lottery revenue goes towards the fund, along with all unclaimed prizes. Additionally, 12% goes to the state. The prize fund is 45% of revenue, with the remaining 15% going towards running costs and profits for the lottery organisers and ticket sellers.

Lotto is a 6 from 59 game which costs £2 per entry. As of the new two-draw format introduced in early June 2026, the odds of specific winning combinations occurring in the Lotto, along with their prizes, are as follows:

Winning combinations	Odds	Winnings
6 numbers	1 : 22,528,738	Jackpot: 8.88% of sales + rollovers (s.t. minimum £1,000,000)
5 numbers + the bonus ball	1 : 3,754,790	£1,000,000
5 numbers	1 : 72,208	£1,000
4 numbers	1 : 1,091	£50
3 numbers	1 : 48.4	£10
2 numbers	1 : 5.4	£1
Any prize	1 : 4.9	(roughly 50% of sales paid out as prizes)

==== Health Lottery ====
In February 2011 the media tycoon Richard Desmond announced the launch of a new Health Lottery, with the aim of raising a minimum of £50 million each year for health-related charities. Tickets cost £1 each and 20% of ticket revenues go to the charities involved.

==== Postcode Lottery ====
The UK Postcode Lottery is in aid of charity, and works by using an entrant's postcode plus a unique three-digit number as their ticket number. Prizes are drawn every Thursday.

=== Scratchcards ===
Scratchcards are small pieces of cardboard where an area has been covered by a substance that cannot be seen through but can be scratched off. Under this area are concealed the items/pictures that must be revealed in order to win.

=== Amusement arcades ===
The Gambling Commission identifies three types of amusement arcades

- adult gaming centres (AGCs)
- licensed family entertainment centres (FECs)
- unlicensed FECs.

In 2009/2010 the FECs made up 81% of the arcade sector in gross gambling yield.

=== Gambling in other venues ===
==== Remote gambling ====
Until the Betting and Gaming Act 1960 off-course betting in person was illegal, but bets by telephone were legal since this was not considered, by the letter of the law, "resorting to a house kept for the purpose of betting". However, it was frequent for "bookie's runners" to take and run bets from a public telephone to the bookmaker himself.

Remote gambling is growing in popularity in the United Kingdom. According to the survey conducted by the Gambling Commission, as of March 2010, 10.7% of the 8,000 adults surveyed said they had participated in at least one form of remote gambling in the previous 4 weeks. In 2009 the figure was 10.5%, in 2008 – 7.2%, in 2007 – 8.8%, in 2006 – 7.2%. The major part of these gamblers was represented by those playing the National Lottery online. Upon their exclusion, the figures are 5.7%, 5.7%, 5.6% and 5.2% respectively.

All forms of online gambling are licensed by the Gambling Commission and therefore can be legally provided in the country under a licence from the commission. The commission's site has details of both licensed operators and applicants.

Many bookmakers such as 888sport, Betfair, Ladbrokes and William Hill have offshore operations but these are largely for overseas customers since no tax is due on winnings of bets in the UK. Before 2001, a 10% levy was paid on bets at an off-course bookmaker (but none at a racecourse) and this could be paid "before" or "after" i.e. on the stake or the winnings, the proceeds going to the Horserace Totalisator Board. Many would advise you, as a tipster, to "pay the tax before" since it is a smaller amount, but mathematically it works out the same since arithmetical multiplication is commutative. This tax was abolished with the general reform of the gambling acts.

==== Licensed premises (pubs) ====
Until the Gambling Act 2005, the Betting Gaming and Lotteries Act 1963 prohibited "betting and the passing of betting slips" in licensed premises, that is those licensed to sell alcohol. Six specific games, Pool, Cribbage, Darts, Bar billiards, Shove-halfpenny and Dominoes could be "played for small stakes on those parts of the premises open to the public". A notice to the effect had to be posted in a prominent place.

It is legal to place bets via mobile phones from a pub, even through the pub's wi-fi connection, but only for oneself, not for another. It is also legal for publicans to have pools coupons or other slips available, but not to take the bets themselves. Passing on a bet on behalf of another, in any capacity, is generally considered by law to be acting as an agent and would require a licence.

== Syndicates ==
Betting syndicates, where several bettors pool their bets, may or may not be illegal, depending on the nature of the scheme. Again, the person actually laying the bet could be considered an agent, especially if they take a cut of the stake. However, lottery syndicates are extremely common and even officially encouraged. The legal fine point is whether the person collecting the individual stakes and placing the bets is doing so with or without profit (regardless of whether that person is also a member of the syndicate). Sweepstakes for the Grand National and occasionally other events are extremely common in offices, and are generally winked at if played for small stakes and not for profit (or that any profit goes to charity).

Publicans must also be vigilant in ensuring that their customers do not pass betting slips between each other but only bet for themselves. In general, it is illegal for the holder of a licence to sell alcohol to facilitate betting on the premises.

== Economy and taxation ==
"Betting duty" at 6.75% was applied to sports bets until 2001 when it was replaced by a 15% tax on gross profits. From 2019, tax on remote gaming increased to 21%.

Since 1 December 2014, the Gambling (Licensing and Advertising) Act changes the taxation of remote gambling from a 'place of supply' basis to a 'point of consumption' basis.

The betting industry alone is reported to contribute £6 billion as of January 2010, 0.5% of GDP. Furthermore, it employs over 100,000 people and generates £700 Million in tax revenue.

In July 2026, the UK changed how gambling penalties would be collected and allocated. Under the new rules, financial penalties paid by British gambling operators would be paid directly to the government's accounts, rather than being directed to charities and research bodies.

== Health implications ==
According to the NHS Long Term Plan more than 400,000 people in England are problem gamblers and two million people are at risk. Health provision for problem gamblers is very limited, according to Bill Moyes, chair of the Gambling Commission. Simon Stevens, Chief Executive of NHS England, pointed out in 2019 that the industry spends £1.5 billion a year on marketing but under £10 million to picking up the health consequences.

The industry refers to problem gamblers as VIPs. According to The Guardian, the industry actively encourages VIPs to gamble more by providing them with free gifts. The industry recruits staff to target VIPs and get them to spend more, to contact VIPs who have not gambled for some time and get them to restart gambling, to identify less serious gamblers who could become VIPs and get them to gamble more.

Shortly after being appointed Prime Minister in July 2026, Andy Burnham criticised gambling companies for "targeting some of the most vulnerable in our communities" and announced plans to use increased tax levies on gambling operators to fund struggling, "good" high-street businesses throughout the UK.

== Age restrictions ==
Gambling ages in the United Kingdom are set out in the Gambling Act 2005: Part 4, Protection of children and young persons.

Type of gambling	Minimum age	Relevant sections of the Act
Gambling in casinos or other licensed gambling premises It is illegal to permit any person under the age of 18 to enter a licensed gambling premises. The only exception is licensed family entertainment centres.	18	46, 47, 48 and 49
Gaming machine (Machine category: A, B1, B2, B3, B3A, B4, C)	18	47 and 48
Gaming machine (Machine category: D)	None	46 (2)(e) and 48 (2)(e)
Lotteries	16	48 (2)(c)
Football pool	16	48 (2)(d)
Private or non-commercial gaming and betting	None	48 (2)(a)&(b)
Equal chance gaming in accordance with a prize gaming permit, or Equal chance gaming at a licensed family entertainment centre	None	48 (2)(f)&(g)
Prize gaming at a non-licensed family entertainment centre, or Prize gaming at a travelling fair	None	48 (2)(h)&(i)

== Advertising restrictions ==
The UK government previously limited television ads to only National Lottery, Bingo, and football pools, but when a new Gambling Act came into effect in 2007 they relaxed all of those restrictions. By 2013, the UK media regulator Ofcom reported that this approach had led to a seven-fold increase in the number of gambling ads that were aired on the TV.

The Committee of Advertising Practice, which is responsible for penning advertising codes in the UK, announced new rules aimed at protecting children under the age of 18 from content promoting gambling. To realize this, bookmakers are required to ensure that online wagering promotions are not aired to minors. To fully comply with this provision, operators are required to refrain from placing ads that promote betting on websites that target children.

The rules also prohibit gambling companies from running real-money wagering ads on video games that are popular with children, and it is upon these companies to ensure that their marketing content does not contain imagery that may appeal to children.

== Anti-money laundering and welfare checks ==
All UK licensed online casinos and sportsbooks are mandated to perform anti-money laundering checks, and mental and financial welfare checks on their customers. Such checks include providing proof of income for large deposits, affordability checks and answering questionnaires about how gambling affects their daily life.

However, such checks have received criticism and bookmakers have been accused of using them as pretexts to void winning bets. In August 2026, a survey conducted by GamblingNews.uk found that 68% of Brits believe bookmakers sometimes "use anti-money laundering and responsible gambling checks as pretexts to void winning bets or delay payouts". The same survey revealed 31% of British punters had placed bets on unregulated betting platforms, including prediction markets platforms like Polymarket.

== See also ==
- List of UK casinos
- Gambling Act details and updates
