= Flutter Entertainment =

Gambling business

Flutter Entertainment plc
- Formerly: Paddy Power Betfair (2016–2019)
- Type: Public
- Traded as: NYSE: FLUT; LSE: FLTR
- ISIN: IE00BWT6H894
- Industry: Gambling
- Founded: 2016; 10 years ago
- Headquarters: Dublin, Ireland (registered); New York City, US (operational)
- Key people: John A. Bryant (chairman); Peter Jackson (CEO)
- Brands: Betfair; FanDuel; Paddy Power; PokerStars; Sky Betting & Gaming; Sportsbet; Tombola
- Revenue: ▲£14,048 million (2024)
- Operating income: ▲£869 million (2024)
- Net income: ▲£162 million (2024)
- Total assets: ▼£24,508 million (2024)
- Total equity: ▼£9,459 million (2024)
- Number of employees: 27,345 (2024)
- Website: www.flutter.com

Flutter Entertainment plc is an Irish-American multinational sports betting and gambling company. It is listed on the New York Stock Exchange. It owns brands such as Betfair, FanDuel, Paddy Power, PokerStars, Sky Betting & Gaming, Sportsbet, and Tombola. Flutter is the world's largest online betting company.

== History ==
Paddy Power and British rival Betfair agreed terms for a merger on 8 September 2015. The business is owned 52% by the former Paddy Power shareholders and 48% by the former Betfair shareholders. The merger was completed on 2 February 2016. On 5 April 2016, it was announced that 650 jobs in the United Kingdom and Ireland would be lost at the company, as a result of the merger.

On 18 October 2016, the company paid out $1.1M to those who bet on Hillary Clinton in the presidential election in the United States, citing a certainty of Clinton's victory. However, Donald Trump went on to win the following month.

In May 2017, it acquired daily fantasy sports operator Draft.

In August 2017, it was announced that Peter Jackson, CEO of Worldpay UK, would succeed Breon Corcoran as CEO of Paddy Power Betfair.

In March 2018, the company announced that it would be implementing an electronic self exclusion process through its in-shop app. The new system will replace the current paper based process, and will be implemented across the United Kingdom.

In May 2018, Paddy Power Betfair announced its intent to acquire FanDuel, one of the two leading daily fantasy sports operators in the United States. The deal was part of an effort to bolster the company's assets in the United States, following the overturning of a federal prohibition on sports betting. As part of the acquisition, the company paid $158 million and merged its existing operations in the United States into FanDuel to form FanDuel Group. It holds a 61% controlling stake, with the option to increase its stake to 80% after three years and 100% after five.

In October 2018, Paddy Power Betfair was fined £2.2 million by the Gambling Commission for failing to protect customers showing signs of problem gambling, and for failing to carry out adequate anti money-laundering checks.

In February 2019, the company announced the acquisition of a 51% controlling stake in Adjarabet, a business operating in the Georgian gambling industry with an option to acquire the remaining 49% after three years.

On 6 March 2019, Paddy Power Betfair announced that it would rebrand as Flutter Entertainment, pending shareholder approval at the company's annual general meeting in May. Flutter was originally the name of a betting exchange acquired by Betfair in December 2001. The company argued that the changing in name was meant to reflect the growing number of consumer brands in its portfolio.

On 2 October 2019, Flutter Entertainment announced its acquisition of Canadian gambling operator The Stars Group for US$6.95 billion, creating the world's largest online gambling company based on revenues. As part of the purchase, media company Fox Corporation (who held a minority stake in The Stars Group after partnering with the company on Fox Bet—a bookmaker co-branded with its Fox Sports division) took a 2.6% minority stake in Flutter Entertainment, and will have the option to acquire an 18.5% stake in FanDuel Group in July 2021. On 3 December 2020, Flutter announced that it would purchase an additional stake in FanDuel Group from Fastball Holdings for $4.1 billion in a cash-and-stock deal, increasing its stake to 95%.

In January 2021 Flutter acquired a majority 50.1% stake of Indian Rummy provider Junglee Games for $67 million.

In April 2021, amid discussion of a FanDuel Group initial public offering, Fox sued Flutter over its option to acquire a stake in FanDuel, stating that Fox's purchase price should be at a $11.2 billion valuation, the same as Flutter's purchase price of FanDuel in December 2020, rather than based on Flutter's valuation of fair market value as of July 2021.

In July 2021, Flutter offloaded the odds comparison website Oddschecker to Bruin Capital for £155m.

In December 2021, Flutter Entertainment announced it would be acquiring the Italian online games provider Sisal for €1.913bn/£1.62bn. The transaction was completed in August 2022.

In January 2022, Flutter acquired the online bingo company Tombola.

In November 2022, an arbitrator ruled that Fox Corporation had an option to acquire an 18.6% stake in FanDuel for $3.7 billion, based on a valuation of $20 billion, with the price increasing by 5% for each year of the 10-year option.

In July 2023, the company announced that Fox Bet will shut down by the end of August 2023.

In September 2023, it was announced Flutter had acquired an initial 51% stake in Novi Sad-headquartered omni-channel sports betting and gaming operator, MaxBet for €141 million in cash.

In May 2024, Flutter moved its primary stock listing from the London Stock Exchange to the New York Stock Exchange with London becoming its secondary listing.

In September 2024, Flutter announced its acquisition of Snaitech, one of Italy's leading gambling operators, in a €2.3 billion deal.

In July 2026, Flutter announced it would be implementing redundancies across its PokerStars division as part of a restructuring initiative, but it did not specify how many employees would be made redundant.

== Operations ==
The business operates across four divisions; United States; International; UK & Ireland and Australia.

The United States division includes FanDuel and TVG, a pari-mutuel online betting network, which is active in thirty five states. In New Jersey, the company has an online casino and a horse racing betting exchange. It also runs FanDuel TV, formerly known as TVG Network, which focuses on coverage of horse racing, and studio coverage of mainstream sports from the perspective of betting.

The UK & Ireland division comprises the Paddy Power, Betfair, Tombola and Sky Betting & Gaming brands in the United Kingdom and Ireland. Betfair also operates an online betting exchange. The division operates over six hundred betting shops in the United Kingdom and Ireland. The Sky Betting and Gaming, Paddy Power and Betfair are regulated in the United Kingdom by the Gambling Commission.

In Australia, they own Sportsbet.

The Board is chaired by John A. Bryant.

== Legal issues ==
In 2024, a Georgian court awarded Aviator LLC in a trademark and copyright case against Flutter and Spribe over its "Aviator" online game. The case was filed by a former shareholder of its Georgian subsidiary, Adjarabet. Flutter announced later that year that it was appealing the ruling against itself.

In 2025, Flutter, alongside, Entain, Tipico, and other gambling organisations, faced major consumer claims in Germany. Lawyers claimed that tens of thousands of gamblers were due a return of their losses because these betting operators were operating in Germany without a license. The EU Reporter estimated damages could reach around 1 billion euros. The gambling companies claimed that they were eligible to operate across continental Europe due to their Maltese license, but the German courts have sided with the claimants. As a result, it was decided that the case would move up to the European Court of Justice.
