= Breon Corcoran =

Irish businessman

- Born: Breon Thomas Corcoran; July 1971 (age 54); Mullingar, Ireland
- Education: Trinity College Dublin; INSEAD
- Occupation: Businessman
- Board member of: Tilney Group; Betfair Australasia
- Spouse: Married
- Children: 3

Breon Thomas Corcoran (born July 1971) is an Irish businessman, the CEO of IG Group and a non-executive director of Tilney Investment Management Services and Bestinvest, both part of the Tilney Group. He was CEO of Paddy Power Betfair from February 2016 to January 2018 and CEO of WorldRemit from October 2018 to August 2022.

== Early life ==
Breon Thomas Corcoran was born in July 1971, in Mullingar, Ireland in 1971. He has a degree in Mathematics from Trinity College Dublin and an MBA from INSEAD.

== Career ==
He worked for JP Morgan and Bankers Trust, before joining bookmakers Paddy Power in April 2001 with responsibility for developing the non-retail business, becoming a board director in 2004, and rising to COO in August 2010. He joined Betfair as CEO in August 2012. In September 2015 he then led the merger of Betfair with his former employer Paddy Power, for which the Sunday Times named him its 2015 Businessperson of the Year.

In June 2015, Corcoran was appointed as a non-executive director of Tilney Group.

In 2016, he sold part of his share package in Betfair for an estimated £4.1 million.

In August 2017, Corcoran announced he was stepping down as CEO of Paddy Power Betfair, he was succeeded in January 2018 by Peter Jackson. In 2019 the business renamed itself as Flutter Entertainment.

In October 2018, Corcoran joined WorldRemit as their CEO.

On 8 February 2021, British digital auction platform Auction Technology Group (ATG), chaired by Corcoran, announced plans to float in the London Stock Exchange in March 2021. The listing is expected to value ATG at £600 million, and the firm said it is hoping to raise £250 million through the IPO.

In December 2023 the online trading/spreadbetting business IG Group announced that Corcoran was to become its next CEO, from January 2024.

== Personal life ==
Corcoran is married with three children and lives in Richmond, London.
