= Gary McGann =

- Born: August 1950 (age 76); Palmerstown, County Dublin, Ireland
- Education: University College Dublin; Trinity College Dublin
- Occupation: Chartered accountant
- Known for: Former CEO Smurfit Kappa; Former CEO Aer Lingus; Former non-exec director Anglo Irish Bank; Former chairman Flutter Entertainment
- Board member of: Green REIT; Smurfit Kappa; Flutter Entertainment; Aryzta; Sisk; Aon Ireland
- Spouse: Moira McGann
- Children: 3

Gary McGann (born August 1950) is an Irish accountant, the former chairman of Flutter Entertainment, and former CEO of Smurfit Kappa and Aer Lingus.

== Education ==
McGann earned a bachelor's degree from University College Dublin and also an MSc in management science from Trinity College Dublin.

== Career ==
McGann was CEO of Smurfit Kappa from November 2002 to August 2015, when he retired from executive roles.

McGann was a non-executive director and member of the audit committee, of failed Irish bank, Anglo Irish Bank from 2004 to its nationalisation in 2009.

In 2019, McGann lost a tax appeal against tax treatment on two payments totalling €2.3 million from when he was chief executive of Smurfit Kappa in 2011. The Tax Appeals Commission ruled the €2.3m claimed as a gift from shareholders was liable for tax.

In late 2016, McGann was appointed as chairman of Aryzta. In August 2020, he announced he was stepping down from the Board of Aryzta.
