= Betfair =

British online gambling company

- Type: Division
- Industry: Gambling
- Founded: June 2000; 26 years ago
- Founders: Andrew Black; Edward Wray
- Headquarters: London, England
- Key people: John A. Bryant (chairman); Peter Jackson (CEO)
- Products: Betting exchange, sports betting, online casino, online poker, online bingo
- Owner: Flutter Entertainment
- Website: betfair.com

Betfair is a British gambling company founded in 2000. Its product offering includes betting exchange, sports betting, online casino, online poker, and online bingo. Business operations are led from its headquarters in London, alongside satellite offices in Ceuta, Dublin, Leeds, and Malta. In February 2016, Betfair merged with Paddy Power to create Flutter Entertainment.

== History ==
The company was founded in June 2000, by Andrew Black and Edward Wray. Softbank purchased 23% of Betfair in early April 2006, valuing the company at £1.5 billion. In December 2006, Betfair completed the purchase of the horseracing publishing company Timeform (which traded under the name Portway Press Ltd).

Betfair was the first betting company to sponsor an English football team, featuring on the kit of Fulham in the 2002–03 season before the Gambling Act 2005 prohibited the industry from advertising on television and radio.

In March 2007, Betfair launched its own Betfair Radio service, available via its website, on the telephone and elsewhere. This has now become Timeform Radio, broadcasting horse racing commentary and results. On 27 January 2009, Betfair announced the purchase of the TVG Network in the United States from Macrovision US$50 million as part of Macrovision's dissolving of TV Guide's assets.

In November 2009, Betfair announced a deal with the New York Racing Association that allows Betfair's customers to start wagering immediately on Aqueduct's thoroughbreeding races. Betfair floated on the London Stock Exchange with a stock symbol of BET on 22 October 2010 at £13, valuing the company at £1.4bn ($2.2bn).

In March 2011, the company moved some of its operations to Gibraltar to reduce the amount they paid in tax. In May 2012, Betfair launched a Sportsbook (fixed-odds betting) service to compete with traditional bookmakers.

In August 2014, Net Entertainment NE AB entered into a partnership with Betfair to expand its reach into the market in the United Kingdom. It was announced in September 2015 that Paddy Power and Betfair had agreed terms for a merger. The transaction was structured as an acquisition of Betfair by Paddy Power and the enlarged entity, named Paddy Power Betfair, is based in Dublin. The merger was completed on 2 February 2016.

== Operations ==
As of 2013, Betfair had over 4 million customers (1.1 million active customers) and a turnover in excess of £50 million a week. The company employed 1,800 people worldwide.

Betfair claims on average 20 per cent better odds than those offered by a traditional bookmaker. Betfair charges a commission on all winning bets, the market base rate is set at between 5 and 7 percent of the net winnings for most markets, depending on the country you reside, although according to how much a client wagers on the site, it is possible to reduce the base rate by as much as 60%.

However, if a bettor on the website is efficiently profitable Betfair will require them to pay at least 20% and up to 60% of gross profits in total charges after they have participated in 250 markets. These charges are non-refundable if the bettor's account subsequently goes or reverts to an unprofitable status.

In late autumn of 2005, Betfair finalised a deal that began in early summer, to purchase the online poker site PokerChamps.com, which the company will integrate into its network, replacing a poker arm that previously used gaming technology software from CryptoLogic Inc.

In a press release, the company's then poker head, Ben Fried, stated: "Having our own poker software puts us in command of our own destiny. It means we can react quickly to customer feedback and continue to develop an innovative, community focused product. We are confident that we are laying the foundations of a market leading poker room".

Cash 4 Clubs is a sports funding scheme set up and funded by Betfair. The scheme provides sports grants to local community sports clubs.

=== Overseas business ===
Betfair owns subsidiaries in the United States. The main company is FanDuel TV, which is dedicated to horse racing, broadcasting live races as well as race analysis, interviews, handicapping tips and features. It was acquired in 2009 for $50m. Betfair also has a subsidiary called BetfairCasino.com which is a New Jersey licensed provider of online gaming products.

In February 2014, Betfair were granted two online gambling licenses by the State Gambling Commission of Bulgaria.

On 7 April 2014, Betfair launched its betfair exchange in Italy. In May 2016, it launched a betting exchange in New Jersey, United States.

In March 2018, Betfair successfully trialled an auto-cash out feature with its live betting customers in the UK and Ireland. The features allow players to lock in their chosen profit.

In December 2021, Betfair announced the launch of their online casino overseas. Although already established within the online sports betting industry, the company launched its online casino available online to consumers residing in the UK, New Jersey, Argentina, Mexico, New Zealand, Australia, Iceland, Ireland and select states in the US.

==== Australia ====
In November 2005 the Tasmanian government announced a deal to license Betfair Australia in the state. It was the second licence awarded to Betfair outside the United Kingdom, the first being in Malta with subsequent licences following in Austria and Germany, and Tasmania now receives substantial tax revenues. However it infuriated the established monopolistic totalisators and bookmakers (due to loss of revenue) and governments (due to loss of taxes) in the other Australian states. A ban on the use of betting exchanges took effect in Western Australia on 29 January 2007, with Betfair successfully claiming this new law violated the Constitution of Australia.

In a unanimous verdict by the High Court of Australia on 27 March 2008, the two provisions of the legislation, purporting to ban Western Australians from using a betting exchange and prohibiting an unauthorised business from using Western Australian race lists, were declared invalid as they applied to Betfair. The provisions were characterised as imposing a burden on interstate trade that was protectionist in nature and therefore contravened section 92 of the constitution. The Court decision suggests, but leaves open, that a more narrowly drafted ban may have been allowed (e.g., banning people in Western Australia from laying "lose bets" on events held in Western Australia).

In the 2012 High Court case of Betfair Pty Limited v Racing New South Wales, Betfair's appeal, against a newly enacted fee to access New South Welsh vital race field information, was rejected. The Court held that the relevant law would have no discriminatory or protectionist effect on interstate trade, thereby complying with section 92 of the Constitution of Australia, and that Betfair had not proven that the fee would cause significant economic damage (not to the extent of the appellants in Castlemaine Tooheys Ltd v South Australia).

In August 2014, Betfair completed the sale of their 50% stake in Betfair Australia to venture partner Crown Resorts, one of Australia's largest gaming and entertainment groups.

== Chief executive officers ==
In October 2005, chief executive Stephen Hill announced his resignation when the board decided not to proceed with plans for a stock market flotation, the investors holding out for a higher valuation. In January 2006, Chief Technology Officer David Yu was appointed Chief executive of Betfair. In December 2011, after overseeing the company's 2010 Initial public offering Yu resigned his position. Breon Corcoran, who was formerly employed by Paddy Power, was appointed in August 2012.

== Sponsorship ==
Betfair has sponsored many sporting events, teams and organisations, including Barcelona F.C. and Conmebol – South American football's governing body. It is currently the main shirt sponsor of Cruzeiro Esporte Clube and CR Vasco da Gama.

== Controversies ==
=== Illegal dividends ===
In its 2014 annual report, the betting firm admitted that its final dividend in 2011 and the interim and final dividends for 2012 and 2013 were paid erroneously because, by law, the "company did not have sufficient distributable reserves to make those distributions and so they should not have been paid by the company to its shareholders". Betfair also admitted that the purchase of 6.5 million shares in April 2012 was executed when the "company did not have sufficient distributable reserves".

=== Data theft ===
In September 2011, Betfair admitted that it had concealed the theft of confidential customer data from the company's 2010 share prospectus. The theft included the payment card details of most of its customers, "3.15m account usernames with encrypted security questions", "2.9m usernames with one or more addresses" and "89,744 account usernames with bank account details". The company further stated that it had informed the Serious Organised Crime Agency of the incident which happened on 14 March 2010 but was not discovered by Betfair data security until 20 May that year.

=== In play betting concerns ===
Betfair offer in play betting on a variety of horseracing events. There has been some controversy over alleged broadcast delays of up to five seconds.

Among the bettors on Betfair's exchange are companies that place high-speed automated bets using predictive models. Some of these companies use courtsiding data transmitted directly from agents located at the event, giving them an edge over recreational punters who do not receive the latest scores as quickly. The practice drew widespread scrutiny after one such agent, working for a company established by former Betfair employees, was arrested at the 2014 Australian Open; charges were later dropped.

=== Advertising ===
In September 2009, the Advertising Standards Authority (ASA) banned Betfair from running two billboard adverts which claimed that their Starting Price (SP) offered 40% better returns, on average than the industry SP. The ASA found that only 10% of the bets used by Betfair in their calculations yielded at least 40% better returns than the industry SP.

In February 2011, the ASA banned another Betfair advert, that stated "On Betfair, you cut out the middle man, which means you could win bigger". The regulator said that the description "cutting out the middleman" was ambiguous and misleading, because the site takes a commission fee on winnings, which could be perceived as a middleman role.

=== Premium charge ===
In September 2008, Betfair introduced a "Premium Charge" for wagerers whose winnings are particularly high compared to the amount of commission they pay. Specifically, members whose commission charges amount to less than 20% of their gross profits, and have placed bets in at least 250 markets, are required to pay the additional charge to make up the difference.

Though Betfair stated that the charge would only affect less than 0.5% of its members, it attracted criticism on its member forum and from the broader exchange betting community. According to The Guardian, the charge significantly changed the relationship between Betfair and its customers, as Betfair can no longer claim to be a neutral betting exchange "where winners are welcome" (its mantra for many years). In June 2011 Betfair raised its Premium Charge to 60% for some customers, a move which was met by outrage.

=== Sports integrity ===
Betfair has noted that they have signed numerous information sharing agreements with governing bodies around the world, with whom they cooperate on matters if the latter suspects corruption to have taken place. Betfair has agreements with some thirty sports bodies, such as the Lawn Tennis Association and the British Horseracing Association, and has been instrumental in several high-profile investigations into suspicious betting.

In June 2010, high-profile racehorse owner and professional gambler Harry Findlay was banned by the British Horseracing Authority for using Betfair to bet against his own horse, Gullible Gordon.

At the disciplinary hearing into Findlay's betting against Gullible Gordon, it was revealed that Findlay had been in financial difficulty and that Betfair had allowed him to use the account of a friend, racehorse owner Eammon Wilmott. In a further twist, the bets were actually made by Findlay "associate" Glenn Gill.

Betfair themselves condemned the punishing of Findlay, saying the punishment was not "proportionate or consistent with similar offences in the past." Findlay had previously called himself "a walking advert for Betfair."

=== Winning bets voided ===
In August 2007, Betfair took the unprecedented step of voiding all bets following a tennis match between Martin Arguello and Nikolay Davydenko because of suspicious betting patterns.

In December 2011, Betfair voided all in running bets on a race at Leopardstown after an automated customer reportedly laid the winning horse Voler La Vedette at odds of 28–1, even as the mare crossed the finish line. The controversy was described as "devastating" by Betfair CEO Stephen Morana, and it affected at least 200 customers who were refused more than £23M in winnings. Some of these customers are believed to be pursuing their case with the independent adjudication body IBAS, as Betfair no longer falls under the jurisdiction of the Gambling Commission since its move to Gibraltar in 2011.

In September 2011 Betfair refused to honour winning bets made by their customers on The Tote Jackpot bet at Newmarket Racecourse. Although funds were removed from customer accounts before the bets had won, the company claimed that due to "technical issues in transmitting bets into the Tote pools in the last 10 minutes before the pool closed", they would not pay any winnings. Reportedly some small gamblers were deprived of wins of up to £16,000 apiece.

=== Duty of Care ===
In 2021, Betfair user, Luke Ashton committed suicide after accruing debts of £18,000. In 2023 a coroner's inquest expressed concerns that Betfair missed opportunities to intervene after his gambling increased. According to the inquest, Betfair had identified Ashton to be “low-risk” despite indicators of problem gambling in his behaviour, with spikes in his activity, spending almost the whole day gambling on Betfair, which the company’s automated algorithms did not pick up on.

Copies of the inquest were sent to the Gambling Commission. In February 2025, the regulator decided not to take further action against Betfair. Ashton's window filed a claim for judicial review shortly after.

The case will be heard in front of the UK High Court in June 2026.
