= Lottery syndicate =

Collective group of lottery players who share winnings among each other

A lottery syndicate is a group of individuals who play a lottery together. By pooling their money and buying multiple tickets collectively, players increase their chance of winning a lottery draw and share any winnings between them. In the UK, 1 in 5 of top game prizes across Lotto, EuroMillions, and EuroMillions UK Millionaire Maker are won by syndicates.

== History ==
Lotteries have been around since the days of the Chinese Han dynasty, with keno slips believed to have financed significant public landmarks like the Great Wall of China. The first known form of collective lottery playing came about in the 18th century in England. State lotteries began in England in the 1690s, but priced out much of the public. As a result, instead of buying full lottery tickets, individuals began buying shares of tickets. People started buying these shares with others and sharing any winnings between them, and the notion of collective lottery playing was born. Some even placed advertisements in newspapers looking for people to share with. In 1798, four low-paid workers reportedly shared a prize of £20,000 between them, which equates to around £1.2m in today’s money.

As government and state-franchised lotteries began to emerge in nations across the world, organized lottery syndicates became more and more prominent. People now typically form lottery syndicates with people they know, like co-workers or family members. Each member pays money to a syndicate organizer who is in charge of buying tickets each week and distributing any winnings. However, online lottery syndicates have gained plenty of traction in recent years. A syndicate formed on Facebook won £1.1 million on the EuroMillions in 2015, whilst there are plenty of sites that enter individuals into lottery syndicates with other online players.

== Notable wins ==
Lottery syndicates have claimed some huge prizes in recent years. The largest on record is the $218.6 million won by an anonymous Maryland-based syndicate known as the ‘Three Amigos’ in 2013. After taxes, the three members went home with $35 million each. Another notable win came from New Jersey, where a sixteen-strong syndicate called ‘Ocean’s 16’ bagged $149 million between them. The New Jersey’s Ocean County Department of Vehicle Services employees earned $3.8 million each from the victory.
