= Andrew Black (entrepreneur) =

British entrepreneur (born 1963)

- Born: Andrew Wilson Black; 13 May 1963 (age 63); Carshalton, London, England
- Education: King's College School; University of Exeter
- Occupation: Co-founder of Betfair
- Spouse: Jane
- Children: 4
- Relatives: Cyril Black

Andrew Black (born 13 May 1963) is a British entrepreneur who, together with Edward Wray, a gambling entrepreneur, founded Betfair, the world's first and largest bet exchange. He is now a noted angel investor in technology businesses in the UK and further afield, and is a keen race horse owner and professional bridge player.

He has won many awards, most notably Ernst & Young emerging entrepreneur of the year in 2002 (shared with Wray).

== Early life ==
Black was born on 13 May 1963, the son of a property developer and grandson of Tory MP for Wimbledon Sir Cyril Black, who campaigned, among other things, against gambling. He attended King's College School in Wimbledon, where he excelled at maths (according to a moneyweek profile in 2009, not citable due to an entry in Wikipedia's blacklist) and then attended the University of Exeter but was asked to leave during his second year, saying later that he had spent most of his time at the bookies rather than attending lectures.

== Career ==
Black took a succession of unskilled positions after dropping out of university but when his younger brother, Kevin, contracted a debilitating brain infection at the age of 19 Black gave up work to look after him until his death aged 21. Black then worked in the City of London for a derivatives business, but during this time was becoming increasingly successful as a gambler, eventually earning sufficient money in winnings to give up work and concentrate on gambling full-time for a while. After initial success, full-time gambling looked unlikely to provide sufficient financial support for Black, who was newly married, so he set up a software business. The business won an on-site contract at GCHQ which involved being 'locked out of the office' every day at 5.00 pm, giving him long evenings during which to refine his ideas for a bet exchange. He became friends with Wray through playing bridge together and showed him a prototype he had programmed which succeeded in securing Wray's interest and investment.

== Betfair ==
Black and Wray launched Betfair in 2000, having secured £1m of investment from friends and family. Requests for venture capital investment had been rejected by the funds they had approached.

Other bet exchanges launched at the same time, but worked on the basis of offering single bets which interested punters would then accept individually. Betfair operated on a model more similar to a financial exchange, allowing among other things, multiple small bets to fill a position offered by a gambler wishing to place a large stake on a wager. This approach, combined with the acquisition of rival Flutter in 2001, secured Betfair 90% of the bet exchange market in the UK within a few years of launch.

In 2010 Betfair was floated on the London Stock Exchange at a £13 share price which valued it at £1.4bn, making Black's 15% stake worth approximately £200m. Black is known to have retained much of his stake, benefiting from the share price's subsequent climb to £44 before Betfair was delisted when it was merged with Paddy Power in 2016.

== Post-Betfair activities ==
After leaving Betfair, Black pursued investments and businesses in several sectors, mainly in online retail and biotech. Oil recycling and re‑refining Black has been a non‑executive director and substantial shareholder of Hydrodec Group plc, a company focused on “clean” oil re‑refining technologies. In March 2016 he acquired Hydrodec’s UK operations for £1, including Hydrodec (UK) Limited and Hydrodec Re‑Refining Limited. These assets now operate under entities including Slicker Recycling Limited and Greenbottle Re‑refining (UK) Limited, which are involved in waste‑oil collection and re‑refining in the UK.

== Biotechnology and DNA manufacturing (Touchlight Genetics) ==
In 2012, Black purchased the historic Hampton Water Works, a Victorian pumping station on the River Thames in Surrey. The site was redeveloped into a science and technology campus - known as Morelands-Riverdale - and is now home to Touchlight Genetics, a biotechnology company in which he has a significant investment. https://morelands-riverdale.com/

Touchlight is a cell‑free DNA manufacturer, developing enzymatic DNA (dbDNA) technology as an alternative to traditional plasmid‑based DNA production. Its technology is aimed at applications in vaccines, gene therapies and other genetic medicines. The company has completed a major expansion of its UK manufacturing facility, creating one of the world’s largest GMP‑certified enzymatic DNA production sites, and has secured government grants and partnerships to advance synthetic DNA technology for vaccine development.

== Horse racing and breeding (Chasemore Farm) ==
Together with his wife Jane, Black owns and operates Chasemore Farm, a thoroughbred breeding and racing operation in Surrey. They began developing the farm from 2007 and have since built a bloodstock business focused on producing and racing flat horses.

Through Chasemore and related entities, Black has been active as an owner and breeder in flat racing, producing a host of Pattern Stakes Winners, including Lezoo, Noble Style, Brad The Brief, Boomer, Arthur Kitt and Tattycoram.

== Technology, blockchain and financial infrastructure (Gainsway) ==
Black is also involved in technology and investment activities, through Gainsway Services Limited (co. number 13584218, renamed from Slicker Intelligence Ltd, August 2024). Registered in London, the company’s stated activities include business and domestic software development.

Gainsway is a Cambridge‑based venture and investment business. According to its website it works in financial infrastructure, agentic workflows and performed data.

Among the innovations associated with Gainsway is LiquidOS, a platform described as “providing verification, governance and legal control needed to pledge and mobilise high‑quality assets without compromising control or ownership”. LiquidOS appears to be part of Gainsway’s broader work on new forms of financial infrastructure, combining blockchain, legal structures and data with relation to use of existing real world assets.

== Other Investments ==
Black's known investments include a significant stake in Hydrodec Plc where he has acted as a non-executive director and whose UK operations he acquired in 2016; ownership of Morelands Riverdale, a science park in Hampton, Surrey; a 30% stake in golfbidder.com, a sizeable stake in Touchlight Genetics, and a portfolio of early stage life sciences, gambling, sports and ecommerce business, incluiding including Network Gaming, Bubble and Boku.

== Personal life ==
Black lives on a farm in Surrey with his wife Jane, children and dogs. He is a keen bridge player and has returned to professional‑standard play after focusing on Betfair in its early years.

== Bridge career ==
Before his career in business, Black played rubber bridge professionally. After a long break he returned to high-level competitive duplicate bridge in 2011. Black and his team of professionals have won many titles in the UK and Europe. Playing as England his team have won the Camrose three times. They have played in many World and European Championships.

== Blog ==
Black previously had his own horseracing blog "Bert's Blog" where he discussed his bloodstock operations. The blog also featured interviews with former Betfair staff such as Tony Clare, Steve High and Martin Cruddace.
