= Betting shop =

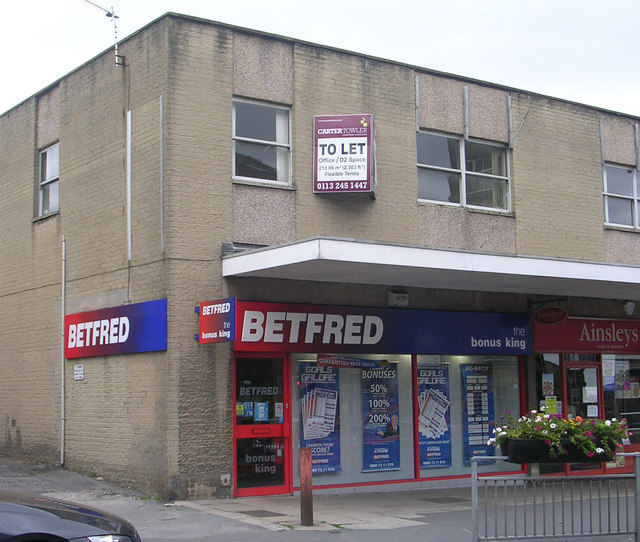
Betfred shop in Yorkshire

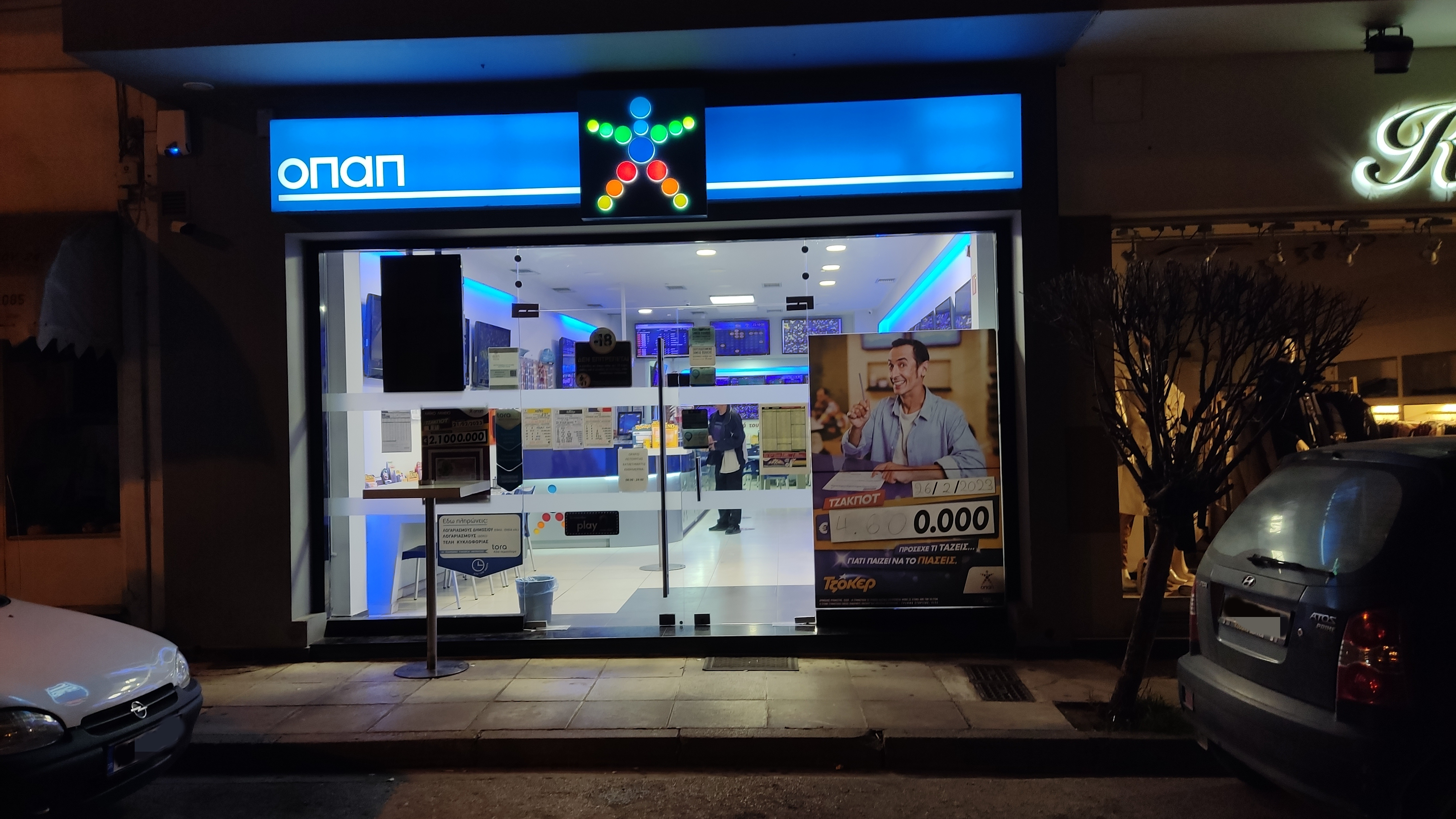
A betting shop in Greece, managed by the state monopoly of Opap

In the United Kingdom, Ireland, Australia and New Zealand, a betting shop is a shop away from a racecourse ("off-course") where one can legally place bets in person with a licensed bookmaker. Most shops are part of chains, including William Hill, Ladbrokes, or Coral. In Australia and New Zealand, they are operated by totalisator agencies. In the United States ever since the Professional and Amateur Sports Protection Act of 1992 was overturned, brands like DraftKings, FanDuel and William Hill have a presence. Betting shops include America's Betshop and Betfred.

== Scale ==
In 2016, there were around 9,000 betting shops located in the UK. The number of shops grew rapidly in the 21st century. One street in Newham has the largest number of bookmakers concentrated in one place: 18 on the street and about 80 in a local zone. However, in 2020, during the COVID-19 pandemic, many betting shops closed permanently.

== Legislation ==
Off-course betting was illegal until the Betting and Gaming Act 1960 was introduced although bets could be placed at a racecourse ("on-course") on any event, even races not being held at that course. Credit betting by post or telephone was legal because of a loophole in the law of "resorting to a house for the purpose of betting" was taken to mean physically resorting to the house, rather than simply communicating with someone there. Windows were required to be covered. Gambling in the United Kingdom is regulated by The Gambling Commission and the Gambling Act 2005.

It is also illegal to allow children under 18 into a betting shop. A 2009 investigation determined that 98 out of 100 betting shops visited would allow children to place a bet.

== Facilities ==
At a betting shop, there are typically noticeboards listing the racing form for the day's horse racing from trade issues of the Racing Post or a similar equestrian publication.

Most betting shops now offer free tea and coffee to attract punters. They usually have large televisions covering all the events, like an American sports bar. Until 1986, they were not allowed to have live broadcast coverage, but the bookmaker often had a small portable television or transistor radio hidden behind the counter. Because punters could not see or hear live coverage, some bookmakers deceived punters by claiming a different result from the actual one or otherwise altered the declared starting price.

That changed in 1986, and Satellite Information Services was formed to screen live races to betting shops. Greyhound races are timed to the second on the feed pictures ever since a scam that intercepted and slightly delayed the broadcast feed for greyhound races, which typically last less than two minutes. By delaying the feed slightly, an accomplice on-course who had already seen the result could communicate by telephone with one in a betting shop off-course, who would bet on a racing certainty.

The larger chains also operate at sports grounds, where bets are placed using pre-printed betting slips. Winnings from bets placed at these facilities can then usually be collected on site, by post or from one of the high street branches.

== Fixed-odds betting terminals ==
In 2013–2014 there was significant controversy with more betting shops springing up on high streets in the United Kingdom, encouraging poor people to gamble, especially to play fixed odds betting terminals. Betting shops are strictly regulated in the number of machines they can have and the payout that they can provide. On 27 April 2014, the government announced proposals to give local authorities more power to limit the number and form of betting shops in their jurisdictions.

A £2 stake limit was introduced for fixed odds betting terminals in the United Kingdom in 2019. Some gambling companies warned that their profitability could be impacted by tens of millions of pounds per year, and that jobs could be lost in betting shops. The culture secretary explained that the government was attempting to help "hundreds of thousands of [vulnerable] people who lose thousands of pounds on these machines".

== See also ==
- Gambling in the United Kingdom
- Sportsbook
- Tipster
- Bookmaker
