= John A. Bryant =

Australian businessman

John A. Bryant is an Australian businessman. He is the chair of Flutter Entertainment. Bryant was the chairman and chief executive officer (CEO) of Kellogg Company (Kellogg's) from 2011 to 2017.

== Early life ==
Born in Brisbane, Queensland, Bryant attended St Edmund's College in Canberra, Australian Capital Territory (ACT).

Bryant received a Bachelor of Commerce from Australian National University in 1987, and an MBA from the Wharton School of the University of Pennsylvania.

== Career ==
Bryant joined Kellogg Company in 1998, and has held a variety of roles, including chief financial officer (CFO); president, North America; president, international; and chief operating officer (COO).

In July 2010, Bryant joined the Kellogg Company's board of directors.

In January 2011, Bryant was named president and CEO.

In July 2014, Bryant was named chairman of Kellogg Company. In this role, he also chairs the executive committee of the board.

Bryant is a trustee of the W.K. Kellogg Foundation Trust. He is on the board of directors of Catalyst, The Consumer Goods Forum, and Macy's, Inc.

Bryant is a chartered accountant of the Institute of Chartered Accountants in Australia.

In September 2023, he was appointed chair of Flutter Entertainment.

== Kellogg Company ==
In 2012, Bryant was sanguine about the purchase of Pringles from Procter & Gamble, after a deal with Diamond Foods fell through.

Bryant has admitted to firing too many employees in the United States during the Great Recession.

In September 2017, the company announced Bryant would retire in the first week of October. Steve Cahillane succeeded Bryant. According to Kellogg spokesperson Kris Charles, as reported by Fortune, it was Bryant's decision to retire. Bryant will stay on as executive chairman until 15 March.

== Personal life ==
Bryant lives in Kalamazoo, Michigan, with his wife Alison and their six children.
