= Peter Jackson (British businessman) =

British businessman (born 1975)

- Born: Jeremy Peter Jackson; 14 October 1975 (age 50); Leeds, Yorkshire, England
- Education: Pembroke College; Cambridge University
- Title: CEO, Flutter Entertainment
- Term: January 2018-
- Predecessor: Breon Corcoran
- Children: 3

Jeremy Peter Jackson (born 14 October 1975) is a British businessman, the chief executive officer (CEO) of Flutter Entertainment since January 2018.

== Early life ==
Jeremy Peter Jackson was born on 14 October 1975 in Yorkshire, England. He has a bachelor's degree in manufacturing engineering from Pembroke College, Cambridge.

== Career ==
Jackson has worked at Lloyds Bank, Halifax Bank of Scotland and McKinsey & Company, and was CEO of Travelex from 2010 to 2015.

On 26 January 2016, Banco Santander appointed Jackson as their new head of the Group´s Innovation area, he replaced José María Fuster who, after more than 30 years service with the Santander Group, agreed to continue as an external advisor.

On 1 March 2017, Jackson joined Worldpay UK as CEO of its UK operations, replacing Dave Hobday who left Worldpay in December to head up the RAC.

In August 2017, it was announced that Jackson would succeed Breon Corcoran as CEO of Paddy Power Betfair in January 2018.

In July 2017, it was announced that Jackson would become the Chairman for Aire Labs, a technology startup in London.

== Personal life ==
Jackson is married with three children.
