= List of IIT Delhi people =

This is a list of people affiliated with the Indian Institute of Technology Delhi, one of the Indian Institutes of Technology in India.

== Notable alumni ==
=== Business ===
| Name | Class Year | Degree | Notability | References |
|---|---|---|---|---|
| Anirudh Devgan | 1990 | B.Tech. (Electrical Engineering) | president and CEO of Cadence Design Systems | |
| Anurag Dikshit | 1994 | B.Tech. (Computer Science and Engineering) | co-founder of Partygaming | |
| Binny Bansal | 2005 | B.Tech. (Computer Science and Engineering) | co-founder of Flipkart | |
| Jyoti Bansal | 1999 | B.Tech. (Computer Science and Engineering) | founder of AppDynamics | |
| Manvinder Singh Banga | 1975 | B.Tech. (Mechanical Engineering) | former chairman, Unilever | |
| Inderjit Camotra | 1985 | B.Tech. (Chemical Engineering) | Managing Director and CEO of Unity Small Finance Bank | |
| Mohit Aron | 1995 | B.Tech. (Computer Science) | founder and CEO of Cohesity and co-founder and former CTO of Nutanix | |
| Padmasree Warrior | 1982 | B.Tech. (Chemical Engineering) | chief technology and strategy officer Cisco Systems; former chief technology officer of Motorola, Inc. | |
| Patu Keswani | 1981 | B.Tech. (Electrical Engineering) | founder of Lemon Tree Hotels | |
| Sachin Bansal | 2005 | B.Tech. (Computer Science and Engineering) | co-founder of Flipkart | |
| Sameer Gehlaut | 1995 | B.Tech. (Mechanical Engineering) | co-founder of Indiabulls | |
| Vikrant Bhargava | 1994 | B.Tech. (Electrical Engineering) | co-founder of Partygaming | |
| Vinod Khosla | 1976 | B.Tech. (Electrical Engineering) | co-founder of Sun Microsystems | |
| Yogesh Chander Deveshwar | 1968 | B.Tech. (Mechanical Engineering) | chairman at ITC | |
| Rajdeep Grewal | | | distinguished professor of marketing at University of North Carolina at Chapel Hill | |
| Rajat Gupta | 1971 | B.Tech (Mechanical Engineering) | managing director of McKinsey & Company, convicted of insider trading | |
| Pramod Maheshwari | | | chief executive officer, Career Point Ltd | |
| Sashi Reddi | | | CEO and founder of AppLabs | |
| Krishan Sabnani | | | Research VP at Alcatel-Lucent Bell Labs, responsible for research on NFV and web communications | |
| Nandu Nandkishore | | | former executive vice president and head of Asia Oceania, Africa of Nestlé S.A, Switzerland | |
| Vivek Gupta | | | president and CEO of Mastech Digital | |
| Ashish Nanda | | | former director of Indian Institute of Management Ahmedabad & Robert Braucher Professor of Practice at Harvard Law School | |
| Rajendra Pawar | 1972 | B.Tech (Electrical Engineering) | co-founder, NIIT | |
| Vijay Thadani | 1972 | B.Tech (Electrical Engineering) | co-founder, NIIT | |
| Nitin Seth | 1993 | B.Tech (Textile Technology) | Bestselling author; Co-Founder and CEO of Incedo Inc. | |

=== Politics and law ===
| Name | Class Year | Degree | Notability | References |
|---|---|---|---|---|
| Jayant Sinha | 1985 | | former Union Minister of State for Finance, Government of India, former managing director at Omidyar Network and partner at McKinsey & Company, Member of Parliament in the Indian Lok Sabha | |
| Kiran Bedi | 1993 | Ph.D. | former Lieutenant Governor of Puducherry | |
| Raghuram Rajan | | | former chief economist of IMF, former chief economic adviser to the Prime Minister of India; 23rd governor of the Reserve Bank of India joined on 5 Sep 2013, Katherine Dusak Miller Distinguished Service Professor of Finance at the University of Chicago Booth School of Business | |
| Somnath Bharti | | | lawyer and politician | |
| Sunjay Sudhir | 1988 | B. Tech | diplomat | |

=== Philosophy and Spirituality ===
| Name | Class Year | Degree | Notability | References |
|---|---|---|---|---|
| Acharya Prashant | 1999 | B.Tech | Indian Author, Philosopher and Advaita Vedanta Teacher, Founder of PrashantAdvait Foundation and Advait Life Education | |

=== Science and technology ===
| Name | Class Year | Degree | Notability | References |
|---|---|---|---|---|
| Anupam Garg | 1977 | M.S. Physics | Professor, Physics & Astronomy, Northwestern University, co-discoverer Leggett-Garg inequality | |
| Madhu Sudan | 1987 | B.Tech. (Computer Science and Engineering) | professor of computer science at Harvard University, ACM Fellow and 2002 Nevanlinna Prize winner | |
| Shrinivas Kulkarni | 1978 | M.Sc. (Physics) | McArthur Professor of Astronomy and Planetary Science, Caltech | |
| Soumitro Banerjee | 1983, 1988 | Ph.D. | electrical engineer, Shanti Swarup Bhatnagar laureate | |
| Subir Sachdev | Did not graduate | B.Tech. | professor of physics at Harvard University | |
| Siddhartha Paul Tiwari | Did not graduate | Doctorate | Technologist, India Science Award laureate, Fellow of the Royal Asiatic Society of Great Britain and Ireland | |
| Venkata Padmanabhan | 1993 | B.Tech. (Computer Science and Engineering) | computer engineer, Shanti Swarup Bhatnagar laureate, ACM Fellow | |
| Vipin Kumar Tripathi | 1967, 1971 | Doctorate | notable Indian Plasma physicist. Former Physics professor of IIT, Delhi. Founder of Sadbhav Mission. | |
| Ajaib Singh Brar | 1977 | Doctorate | Professor of chemistry at IIT Delhi, Saraswati Samman laureate, NASI Fellow | |
| Sanket Goel | 1998 | M.S. Physics | Dean and Professor, BITS Pilani. Fulbright and JSPS Fellow | |
| Naveen Garg | 1991 (BTech), 1994 (PhD) | BTech + PhD (Computer Science and Engineering) | theoretical computer scientist, Shanti Swarup Bhatnagar laureate | |
| Amitabha Bagchi | 1996 | BTech, Computer Science and Engineering | Theoretical Computer Scientist, Novelist | |
| Avinash Kak | | | professor of electrical and computer engineering at Purdue University | |
| Subhash Kak | | | professor of electrical and computer engineering at Oklahoma State University | |
| Devang Vipin Khakhar | 1981 | B.Tech (Chemical Engineering) | chemical engineer, academic, Shanti Swarup Bhatnagar laureate | |
| Sudhanshu Vrati | | | vaccinologist, N-BIOS laureate | |
| Narinder Kumar Gupta | | | honorary member in the area of impact mechanics of the International Society of Impact Engineering. | |
| Predhiman Krishan Kaw | 1966 | Ph.D | Founding Director of Institute for Plasma Research, first PhD graduate of IITD. | |
| Avinash Kumar Agarwal | 1996, 1999 | M.Tech (Energy), Ph.D. (Mech. Eng.) | mechanical engineer, Shanti Swarup Bhatnagar laureate | |
| Mohit Randeria | 1980 | B.A. in Electrical Engineering | condensed matter physicist, Shanti Swarup Bhatnagar laureate | |
| Anurag Sharma | | | optical physicist, academic, Shanti Swarup Bhatnagar laureate | |
| Arogyaswami Paulraj | 1973 | Ph.D (Elect. Engineering) | pioneer in MIMO, professor emeritus in the Dept. of Elect. Engineering at Stanford University | |
| Surendra Prasad | | Ph. D | communications engineer, Shanti Swarup Bhatnagar laureate | |
| Sanjay Puri | 1982 | MS (Physics) | statistical physicist, Shanti Swarup Bhatnagar laureate | |
| Rahul Pandit | | MS (Physics) | condensed matter physicist, Shanti Swarup Bhatnagar laureate | |
| Dinesh Manocha | 1987 | B.Tech. | Distinguished University Professor, University of Maryland, College Park | |

=== Arts and entertainment ===
| Name | Class Year | Degree | Notability | References |
|---|---|---|---|---|
| Amol Parashar | | B.Tech. in Mechanical Engineering | actor | |
| Chetan Bhagat | 1995 | B.Tech. in Mechanical Engineering | Indian novelist | |
| Swami Mukundananda | 1982 | B.Tech. in mechanical engineering | spiritual leader; bestselling author; founder of JKYog and Radha Krishna Temple of Dallas | |
| Tushar Raheja | 2006 | B.Tech in industrial engineering, PhD in applied probability | Indian novelist | |

=== Others ===
- Amardeo Sarma, president German Sckeptics Society
- Kaustubh Khade, kayaker
- Rajesh Aggarwal, Chief Secretary of Maharashtra

== Notable faculty ==
- Durai Sundar, computational biologist, N-Bios laureate
- Munish Chander Puri, professor emeritus of mathematics
- Vipin Kumar Tripathi, notable Indian Plasma physicist and professor emeritus of Physics
- Prof. Rajat K. Baisya, founder, Project and Technology Management Foundation (PTMF)
- Kiran Seth, founder of SPIC MACAY
- Siddharth Pandey (chemist)
