= List of Scindia School alumni =

Students of Scindia School are popularly known as Scindians. Although the total number of Scindians is relatively small (estimated at 9,000 since the school was founded in 1897), they include some of India's most prominent politicians, writers, government officials, military officers, business leaders and entertainers.

== Armed forces ==
Name	Branch	Notability	Ref.
Dushyant Singh	Indian Air Force	Air Marshal	
Om Prakash Mehra	Indian Air Force	Former Chief of the Air Staff	

== Politicians ==
Name	Position	Notability	Ref.
K. Natwar Singh	Member of Parliament	Indian National Congress politician from Rajasthan	
Madhavrao Scindia	Member of Parliament	Indian National Congress politician from Madhya Pradesh	
Pusapati Ashok Gajapati Raju	Member of Parliament	Former Union Minister for Civil Aviation	
Jitendra Singh	Member of Parliament	Union Minister of State in the Prime Minister's Office	
Pavan Varma	Member of Parliament	Janata Dal (United) politician	
Veer Vikram Singh	Member of Legislative Assembly	Bharatiya Janata Party politician from Uttar Pradesh	
George Jivajirao Scindia	Governor	Governor of Gwalior State	
Bharat Vir Wanchoo	Governor	Governor of Goa	

== Diplomats ==
Name	Notability	Ref.
Vikram Misri	Diplomat and Foreign Secretary of India	

== Business and manufacturing ==
Name	Notability	Ref.
Kalyan Banerjee	Chairman of United Phosphorus Ltd and President of Rotary International	
Rajendra S. Pawar	Chairman and co-founder of NIIT	
Pratim Banerjee	Regional Head, TCS West Sweden, TAS	

== Literature ==
Name	Notability	Ref.
Anurag Mathur	Author of The Inscrutable Americans	

== Arts and entertainment ==
Name	Profession	Notability	Ref.
Ananda Shankar	Musician	Composer and musician	
Jalal Agha	Actor	Film actor	
Sooraj R. Barjatya	Director	Film director and producer	
Anurag Sinha	Actor	Film actor	
Salman Khan	Actor	Film actor and producer	
Arbaaz Khan	Actor	Actor, producer and director	
Anurag Kashyap	Director	Film director, producer and screenwriter	
Nitin Mukesh	Singer	Playback singer	
Meet Bros	Musicians	Music composer duo	
Vikas Kalantri	Actor	Television and film actor	
Ameen Sayani	Broadcaster	Radio announcer and broadcaster	
Raj Zutshi	Actor	Film actor	
Abhinav Kashyap	Director	Film director and screenwriter	
Anil Mehta	Cinematographer	Cinematographer	
Kushal Tandon	Actor	Television actor	
Akash Singh Rajput	Actor and singer	Actor and singer	
Shadab Kamal	Actor	Film actor	
