= Marin Academy =

Prep school in San Rafael, California, US

Coordinates: 37.9762°N 122.5347°W

Location
- 1600 Mission Avenue; San Rafael, California; United States

Information
- Type: Private, Coeducational
- Motto: "Think, question, create."
- Established: 1971
- Head of School: Anne Travis Brownley
- Faculty: 118
- Enrollment: 449
- Average class size: 15 students
- Campus type: Suburban
- Colors: Red and black
- Athletics: 35 teams
- Mascot: Wildcat
- Endowment: $19,058,665 (2023)
- Annual tuition: $58,730 (2024)
- Revenue: $33,059,955 (2022-2023)
- Website: http://www.ma.org/

Marin Academy (familiarly known as MA) is a private college preparatory high school in San Rafael, California. Located on the campus that for decades housed the San Rafael Military Academy prior to its closure, Marin Academy was founded in 1971 with 118 faculty members and a student body of 449. Marin Academy is one of the most competitive private high schools in the Bay Area. In the 2015–2016 school year, Marin Academy accepted one in four students who applied.

== Curriculum ==
Foster Hall and 'the Circle' are at the center of Marin Academy's San Rafael campus

The Library building (right) and Bodie Brizendine Leadership Center or 'BBLC' (left), which contains administrative spaces, the school café, and classrooms

A plaque dating from the days of the San Rafael Military Academy

MA requires students to take two years of one of its performing or visual arts programs, four years of English, three years of History, three years of Mathematics, three years of Science (Biology, Chemistry, and one Physics course are required), and two semesters of Human Development, a health and social awareness class. In addition to classroom instruction, Marin Academy students undertake a number of non-traditional learning experiences such as minicourse, the Outings program, end-of-year projects (EOY), wilderness quest, and mandatory senior speeches or senior arts performances. Another unique program is the Marin Academy Research Collaborative (MARC), where students conduct independent research during their junior and senior years. The student body sustains many socially conscious student organizations and has been active in politics in Marin. The school conducts annual conferences and workshops on equality and social justice, called the Conference on Democracy and has a tradition of seniors delivering speeches to school assemblies.

== Academics ==
Marin Academy has a student-to-teacher ratio of 9:1 and an average class size of 15. More than two-thirds of the faculty hold advanced degrees. More than 99% of Marin Academy graduates go on to attend a four-year college or university.

Travis Brownley, an educator who was the dean of the Groton School, was appointed the Head of School in 2008 following the departure of the previous head of school, Bodie Brizendine, who had led the school for 12 years, and Dick Drew, who served as interim head of school. The Bodie Brizendine Leadership Center (BBLC), a centrally located building on campus, houses faculty offices, math classrooms, and the school cafeteria.

== Cheating scandal ==
Marin Academy was involved in the 2019 college cheating scandal "varsity blues" where parents cheated their children into colleges. Between two and three students from Marin Academy had parents who were involved including Todd and Diane Blake of Ross who pleaded guilty to the charges. Additionally, a member of Marin Academy's board of trustees, William McGlashan, was accused of conspiring to bribe and commit mail fraud in relation to the scandal.

== Athletics ==
Marin Academy has developed a strong athletics program, highlighted by successes in boys' and girls' soccer, cross country, boys' lacrosse, boys' water polo, and girls' volleyball. The school competes in The Bay Counties League (BCL) within the North Coast Section (NCS). During the COVID era, the swimming and water polo teams were members of The Marin County Athletic League (MCAL).

Marin Academy has won 11 North Coast Section championships in boys' soccer - 2000, 2001, 2006, 2007, 2008, 2010, 2012, 2014, 2017, 2018, 2019 and 2022 - and is a regular contender for regional championships. Girls' varsity soccer won the BCL and placed second in the North Coast Section Championship, losing to the Branson High School 4–2, in 2002. In 2006, the boys' soccer team won their third NCS championship in a match against University High School. Tied 1-1 through overtime, the NCS championship game was decided by penalty kicks, in which MA won 5–4. MA also defeated University in the BCL finals that year. In 2007, MA and University again matched up in the BCL and NCS championships, with UHS winning BCL and MA winning NCS 2–0. In 2008 MA and University were matched up once again in the BCL final and the Wildcats defeated the Devils 2–0. The two schools are rivals.

The girls' soccer team has won the last 6 BCL titles from 2016 to 2022 (undefeated against league opponents in the last 4 seasons) as well as ones in 2002 and 2010. In 2019 and in 2020 they advanced to NCS finals against Cardinal Newman and to CIF finals against Branson, coming up a goal short in 3 of the games and a penalty kick in the other. In 2022 MA girls soccer won their first NCS title and in 2023, they won their first Norcal Championship.

The girls' volleyball team won the state and NCS division V championships in 2004, after losing to University High School in both the NCS and Northern California championship games the year before. In the 2022 fall season the team won the NCS title.

In the 2012 spring season, the Girls' Varsity Swim Team set the first North Coast Section record in Marin Academy history, with a time of 1:34.82 in the 200 yard freestyle relay. The girls placed fifth overall at NCS, first out of Marin County teams, and first out of schools with fewer than one thousand students.

The Marin Academy boys' water polo team placed first in NCS DII in 2017 after defeating Alameda High School 13–8. In both 2021 and 2022 the team placed second in NCS DII. In 2024, they again placed first in NCS DII after defeating Cardinal Newman in the championship game.

The Marin Academy Cross Country team placed first in NCS DII in 2015 and placed second in the California State Championships D V in both 2013 and 2015.

Current athletics offered include (but are not limited to):

Fall Sports

- Cross Country
- Girls' Volleyball
- Boys' and Girls' Water Polo
- Girls' Tennis
- Girls' Golf
- Girls' Field Hockey

Winter Sports

- Boys' and Girls' Basketball
- Boys' and Girls' Soccer

Spring Sports

- Baseball
- Boys' and Girls' Swimming
- Boys' and Girls' Lacrosse
- Boys' and Girls' Track and Field
- Boys' Golf
- Boys' Tennis

== Notable alumni ==
The following people attended Marin Academy (the year shown is their year of graduation or, for non-graduates, the year that their class graduated)

- Rozzi Crane ('09) – singer-songwriter
- Buck Ellison ('06) – artist
- Rumi Neely ('00) – fashion blogger at Fashion Toast
- Carré Otis ('87) – actress and model
- Ruth Parasol ('84) – co-founder PartyGaming
- Jason Rezaian ('94) – reporter for The Washington Post
- Peter Som ('89) — fashion designer
- Dylan Penn ('09) - actress
