= Western State College of Law =

For-profit law school in Irvine, California, US

Coordinates: 33.39304°N 117.45394°W

Western State College of Law at Westcliff University
- Parent school: Westcliff University
- Established: 1966; 60 years ago
- School type: Private for-profit law school
- Dean: Marisa Cianciarulo
- Location: Irvine, California, United States
- Enrollment: 213 (full-time) 77 (part-time)
- Faculty: 19 (full-time) 34 (part-time)
- USNWR ranking: 175th-196th out of 196
- Bar pass rate: 88% (February 2025) & 78.1% (July 2025 California Bar first-time takers)
- Website: wsulaw.edu
- ABA profile: Western State College of Law profile

Western State College of Law at Westcliff University is a private, for-profit law school in Irvine, California. Founded in 1966, it was acquired by Westcliff University in 2019. It offers full and part-time programs and is approved by the American Bar Association. Western State pays a fee to receive services from the Association of American Law Schools (AALS).

== History ==
Western State College of Law was founded in 1966 in Orange County, California. In 1987, the school applied for accreditation with the American Bar Association (ABA). Although the school was unsuccessful in this attempt, it was at the time accredited by the Western Association of Schools and Colleges and by the California State Committee of Bar Examiners (CBE). The accreditation by the CBE made graduates eligible to sit for the California Bar Examination.

By 1990, Western State had expanded to three campuses in California including locations in Fullerton, Irvine and San Diego. At that time, the school was the largest law school in California. In 1995, Western State again began pursuing accreditation with the ABA for all three of its campuses. In the latter half of the 1990s, the school underwent several changes as part of the accreditation process. In 1995, the school's San Diego campus became the independently owned Thomas Jefferson School of Law and the following year, the school closed its Irvine location and consolidated students to its Fullerton campus. In 1998, the school received provisional accreditation from the ABA and opened a new law library.

In 2000, the college's owners sold Western State to Argosy Education Group, which owned the school for a year before it was purchased by Education Management Corporation. Western State was granted full accreditation with the ABA in 2005, and became the third for-profit law school to receive ABA approval. In April 2012, the school was incorporated as one of the colleges of Argosy University and officially changed its name to Western State College of Law at Argosy University. The same year, the school sold its property to California State University, Fullerton for roughly $18 million. In January 2016, the campus moved to Irvine, California.

In October 2017, it was announced that the college of law was sold, along with the rest of Argosy University, to the Dream Center Foundation, a subsidiary of the Dream Center, a nonprofit Pentecostal network of community centers. The transaction was funded in part by the Najafi Companies, a private equity firm. In 2019, a federal court approved Westcliff University's plan to purchase the school and revert it to for-profit status. The ABA allowed continued accreditation under the ownership of Westcliff University in December 2019.

== Academics ==
=== Admissions ===
For the class entering in 2023, the school accepted 45.1% of applicants, with 33.1% of those accepted enrolling. The average enrollee had a 152 LSAT score and 3.16 undergraduate GPA.

=== Programs ===
Western State offers both full-time and part-time programs. The school offers two areas of focus through their Business Law Center and their Criminal Law Practice Center, which are aimed at preparing graduates for a career in business or criminal law through additional training, internships and networking with lawyers. The law school also offers certificates in Immigration Law, Family Law, and Real Estate.

As of January 2024, the school had 213 full-time students, 77 part-time students, and 19 full-time and 34 part-time members of the faculty.

=== Bar passage ===
The pass rate for Western State alumni taking the California bar exam for the first time in February 2025 was 88%.

=== Rankings ===
U.S. News & World Report ranked the school in the last group of 180–196 out of 196 schools, the bottom 8% at most. In 2020, among all law schools, Western State had the third-highest Diversity Index, as reported by U.S. News & World Report. In addition, in 2020, it received an A+ for Diversity in National Jurist's Best Law Schools.

== Costs ==
The total cost of attendance (indicating the cost of tuition, fees, and living expenses) at the Western State College of Law for the 2018–19 academic year was $63,692 for a student living at home and $77,126 for a full-time student that is self-supporting.

== Post-graduation employment ==
ABA Employment Summary for 2022 Graduates
Employment Status	Percentage of Graduates
Employed - Bar Passage Required	58%
Employed - J.D. Advantage	16%
Employed - Professional Position	12%
Employed - Non-Professional Position	2%
Unemployed - Start Date Deferred	0%
Unemployed - Not Seeking	2%
Unemployed - Seeking	5%
Employment Status Unknown	5%
Total of 85 Graduates

According to Western State's ABA-required disclosures, 88.3% of the Class of 2022 obtained some form of employment ten months after graduation. 25 members, being 58% of the class, obtained JD-required employment, and 7 members, being 16% of the class, obtained JD-advantage employment. Excluding solo practitioners, 55.3% of the class obtained full-time, long-term, JD-required employment with most employed in law firms of 1–10 lawyers.

== Notable alumni ==
- Anthony Adams, a former member of the California State Assembly
- Leslie Alexander (businessman), former owner of the Houston Rockets
- Vito Barbieri, an Idaho state representative
- Roger Benitez, a senior judge of the United States District Court for the Southern District of California
- Bob Chandler, a former American football player
- Mark Chasan, founder of eMusic
- Bonnie Dumanis, former district attorney for San Diego County
- Nguyen Cao Ky Duyen, a Vietnamese-American personality and co-host of Thuy Nga's Paris by Night shows
- Michael Dvorak, former Indiana state representative and former St. Joseph County, Indiana prosecutor
- Mike Garrett, a former American football player and former athletic director at the University of Southern California
- George Gascón, the district attorney for Los Angeles County and the former district attorney for San Francisco
- Duncan Hunter, a former member of the United States House of Representatives and 2008 Presidential candidate
- Ross Johnson (deceased), a former long-time California state legislator
- Mangala Moonesinghe (deceased), a former member of the Parliament of Sri Lanka and former ambassador
- Ruth Parasol, the founder of PartyGaming
- Dick Walsh (deceased), a former Major League Baseball executive
- George O. Wood (deceased), former general superintendent of Assemblies of God
