= NIIT University =

Private Indian university

Coordinates: 27.9614°N 76.4018°E

- Motto: Anadi Anant
- Type: Private
- Established: 2009
- Founders: Rajendra Singh Pawar; Vijay K. Thadani
- Affiliations: UGC
- Chairperson: Amitabh Kant
- President: Prakash Gopalan
- Undergraduates: 900
- Location: Neemrana, Rajasthan, India
- Website: niituniversity.in

NIIT University (Or NU) is a private university founded in 2009. It is located in Neemrana Rajasthan in India. It was founded by Mr. Rajendra Singh Pawar, Chairman of NIIT Ltd and NIIT Technologies Ltd, along with his colleague and co-founder Vijay K. Thadani.

The University was established by an Ordinance of the Government of Rajasthan on 13 October 2009 and subsequently on 4 April 2010 vide Rajasthan Gazette Notification No. F.(11) Vidhi/2/2010, THE NIIT UNIVERSITY, NEEMRANA (ALWAR) ACT, 2010 (Act No. 5 of 2010).

== History ==
List of chairpersons and presidents

Chairpersons

- 2009–2018 Karan Singh
- 2018–2025 Krishnaswamy Kasturirangan
- 2025– Amitabh Kant

Presidents

- 2009–2012 Rajeev Shorey
- 2012–2016 Rajendra Pandey
- 2016–2020 Vajja Sambasiva Rao
- 2020–2020 Prabhu Aggarwal
- 2020–2021 Parimal V. Mandke
- 2021–2023 Rajesh Khanna
- 2023–Prakash Gopalan

NIIT University was founded by Rajendra Singh Pawar in 2009. The university offers undergraduate, postgraduate and doctoral programmes in Computer Science, Electronics and Communications, Biotechnology and Management. NIIT University partnered with ICICI Bank and launched MBA in Finance and Banking. In 2015, the university started MBA in [Business Analytics] jointly with WNS. NIIT University announced a partnership with PwC in 2015 to launch a masters course in cyber security. The university has launched Integrated MBA programme from 2018.

== Campus ==
NIIT University occupies a 100-acre (0.40 km²) fully residential campus. The site is organized into distinct zones for academic instruction, student housing, and athletic activities.

=== Residential and Academic Infrastructure ===
The university provides on-campus accommodation through four residential blocks, partitioned into two hostels for men and two for women. These facilities are supported by three dining halls. The academic center serves as the place of instruction, containing classrooms, research laboratories, and a library. It also includes a central auditorium with a seating capacity of 240.

=== Recreation ===
The campus layout incorporates several outdoor sports facilities, including dedicated fields for cricket and football, alongside courts for basketball, volleyball, and tennis. Indoor recreational amenities include a pool room and other leisure spaces for students.

== Courses ==
The college offers following courses:
Bachelor of Technology:

- Biotechnology
- Computer Science Engineering
- Electronics and Communications Engineering

Masters of Technology:

- Cyber Security
- Education Technology
- Geographic Information Systems

BBA

MBA

PhD Programmes:

- Post Graduate Diploma In banking & Finance

== Rankings ==
NIIT University was ranked among the top 50 Indian universities of the future by India Today Aspire.

== See also ==
- Neemrana
- List of state private universities in India
- List of institutions of higher education in Rajasthan
- List of universities in India
- Universities and colleges in India
- Education in India
