= World Computer Literacy Day =

Annual observance

World Computer Literacy Day was launched by Indian computer company NIIT to mark its 20th anniversary in 2001, in response to research which suggested that the majority of computer users around the world were men. It occurs annually on 2 December, and is intended to encourage the development of technological skills, particularly among children and women in India. In its own words, it aims to "create awareness and drive digital literacy in underserved communities worldwide". It was originally founded by the NIIT The day is also directed at innovating the teaching of Information Technology, & more generally, the "celebration of computers".
