= Ruth Parasol =

American entrepreneur and attorney (born 1967)

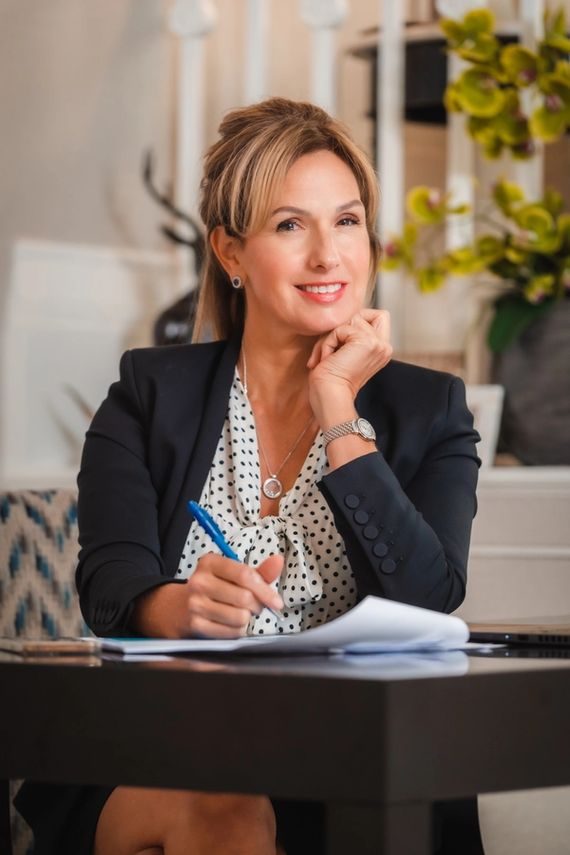
- Born: February 27, 1967 (age 59); San Francisco, California, U.S.
- Education: University of San Francisco (BA); Western State College of Law (JD)
- Spouse: Russ DeLeon (m. 2003, div. 2014)

Ruth Monicka Parasol (born February 27, 1967) is an American businesswoman and lawyer who founded PartyGaming in 1997. The company floated on the London Stock Exchange in 2005 for US$8.46 billion. It was then a record valuation and the largest online poker room.

The company grew to generate more than $500 million in annual profits by 2005 and then floated its IPO on the London Stock Exchange at a value of £4.64 billion ($8.46 billion), and in September of that year was admitted to the FTSE 100 list of companies - a first for a female founded and spearheaded company. By the end of 2015, Parasol sold her final shares.

In 2010, The Economist ranked her 15th of the world's wealthiest self-made women.

According to the Sunday Times Rich List in 2020, Parasol has an estimated net worth of £780 million.

== Personal life ==
Parasol was born in 1967 in San Francisco, California. She is the eldest daughter of Guna Parasol, who is Swedish, and Richard Parasol, a Jewish-Polish Holocaust survivor who served in the Israel Defense Forces. Richard eventually emigrated to study mechanical engineering at California Polytechnic State University. Richard worked as an engineer for several years and then went on to become a real estate developer.

Parasol grew up in Mill Valley, California, graduated from Marin Academy in 1984, and received a B.A. in Business from the University of San Francisco in 1988.

After earning her juris doctor from Western State College of Law at Argosy University in 1992, Parasol worked for her father's real estate management business. Parasol also amassed a small fortune in the business of online pornography and the operation of phone sex lines.

In 2003, Parasol married Russ DeLeon. They moved with their children to Gibraltar in 2004. They separated in 2010, and were decreed divorced in early 2014. Parasol continues to reside primarily in Gibraltar and to maintain homes in Israel, London, and Spain.

== Involvement in the gaming industry ==
Parasol launched Starluck Casino Online in the Caribbean in 1997. In 1998, she made software engineer Anurag Dikshit a partner in her business, which later became known as PartyGaming Plc. In turn, Dikshit made Parasol a partner in his IT services business based in India. Vikrant Bhargava and Russ DeLeon joined as principals of Party Gaming in 2000 and 2001 respectively. Parasol and her ex-husband served as consultants to PartyGaming Plc until December 2006, and they sold their remaining shares in 2015.

After the launch of PartyPoker.com in 2001, PartyGaming Plc grew to generate more than $500 million in annual profits by 2005. In June 2005, PartyGaming Plc floated its IPO on the London Stock Exchange at a value of £4.64 billion ($8.46 billion), and in September of that year was admitted to the FTSE 100 list of companies. In October 2006, PartyGaming publicly withdrew from the U.S. market after the passage of the Unlawful Internet Gambling Enforcement Act of 2006, a piece of anti-gambling legislation approved by the United States Congress as part of the SAFE Port Act. As a result, the company’s share price dropped 60% and the company subsequently withdrew from the FTSE 100 Index.

In 2008, Anurag Dikshit pleaded guilty to violation of the Federal Wire Act, agreed to cooperate with prosecutors, and personally paid $300 million to the United States Department of Justice as part of his plea. In 2009, PartyGaming entered a non-prosecution agreement with the Justice Department and paid a fine of $105 million. In 2011, the Justice Department reversed its earlier position, determining that the Federal Wire Act does not apply to online poker and casino games, only to sports betting.

== Parasol Foundation Trust ==
Parasol is the Principal Benefactress and Trustee Director, a Gibraltar-based independent philanthropic organization that was founded 2004. As of 2020, the Trust has given over GBP £40 million in donations. The Parasol Trust's grant making focuses on non-profit organizations in the areas of health, the environment and cultural heritage. The Parasol Trust works with organizations such as The Red Cross, The University of Cambridge, Tel Aviv University, Technion University, The Victoria & Albert Museum, The Prince’s Trust, the British Council and MacMillan Cancer Support. The trust also has a special interest in using new technologies and Internet solutions to aid charitable programs.
