= Scindia School =

Coordinates: 26.2175°N 78.1672°E

The Scindia School
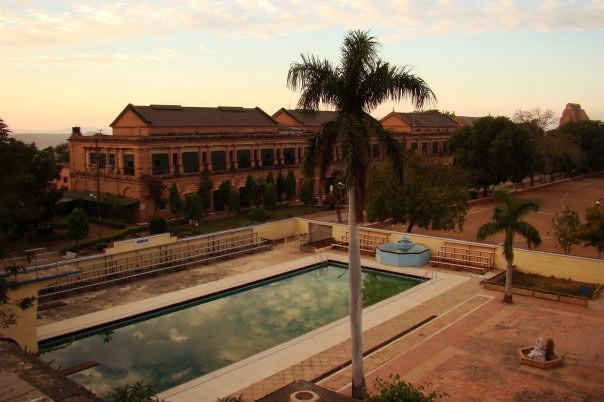
- The Fort; Gwalior; India

Information
- School type: Private Boarding School
- Motto: "Knowledge Liberates"
- Founded: 1897; 129 years ago
- Founder: Maharaja Madho Rao Scindia of Gwalior State
- School board: Central Board of Secondary Education
- Director: Jyotiraditya Madhavrao Scindia
- Principal: Ajay Singh
- Gender: Boys
- Enrolment: 600
- Student to teacher ratio: 1:12
- Classes offered: Class VI to Class XII
- Language: English
- Campus size: 160 acres (0.65 km^{2})
- Colour: Blue/White
- Nickname: Scindian
- Annual tuition: ₹17,17,000 (home students) and ₹17,17,000 (foreign students) (As of February 2026)
- Affiliation: Central Board of Secondary Education
- Website: www.scindia.edu

The Scindia School is an elite residential school for boys, located on iconic Gwalior Fort in Gwalior, India. It was founded in 1897 by Maharaja Madho Rao Scindia of the princely Gwalior State, initially named the Sardar's School. Originally established exclusively to educate the sons of royalty and nobility, the institution expanded admissions in 1933 to include students from broader social backgrounds. Since then, it has operated as an independent boarding school affiliated with the Central Board of Secondary Education (CBSE) having consistently excellent academic track record. The school focuses on building leadership quality while maintaining traditional decipline which makes it highly preferable choice among diplomats, elite UHNIs and defence personals. The school is also known by its nickname the "Bollywood School" due to many actors and filmmakers have been educated and are now part of its star alumni board. The school houses roughly 600 pupils aged 12 to 18, and admission is based on a competitive entrance examination.

The school has a range of alumnus including actors, musicians, industrialists, diplomats, politicians, army men and top CEOs.

== History ==
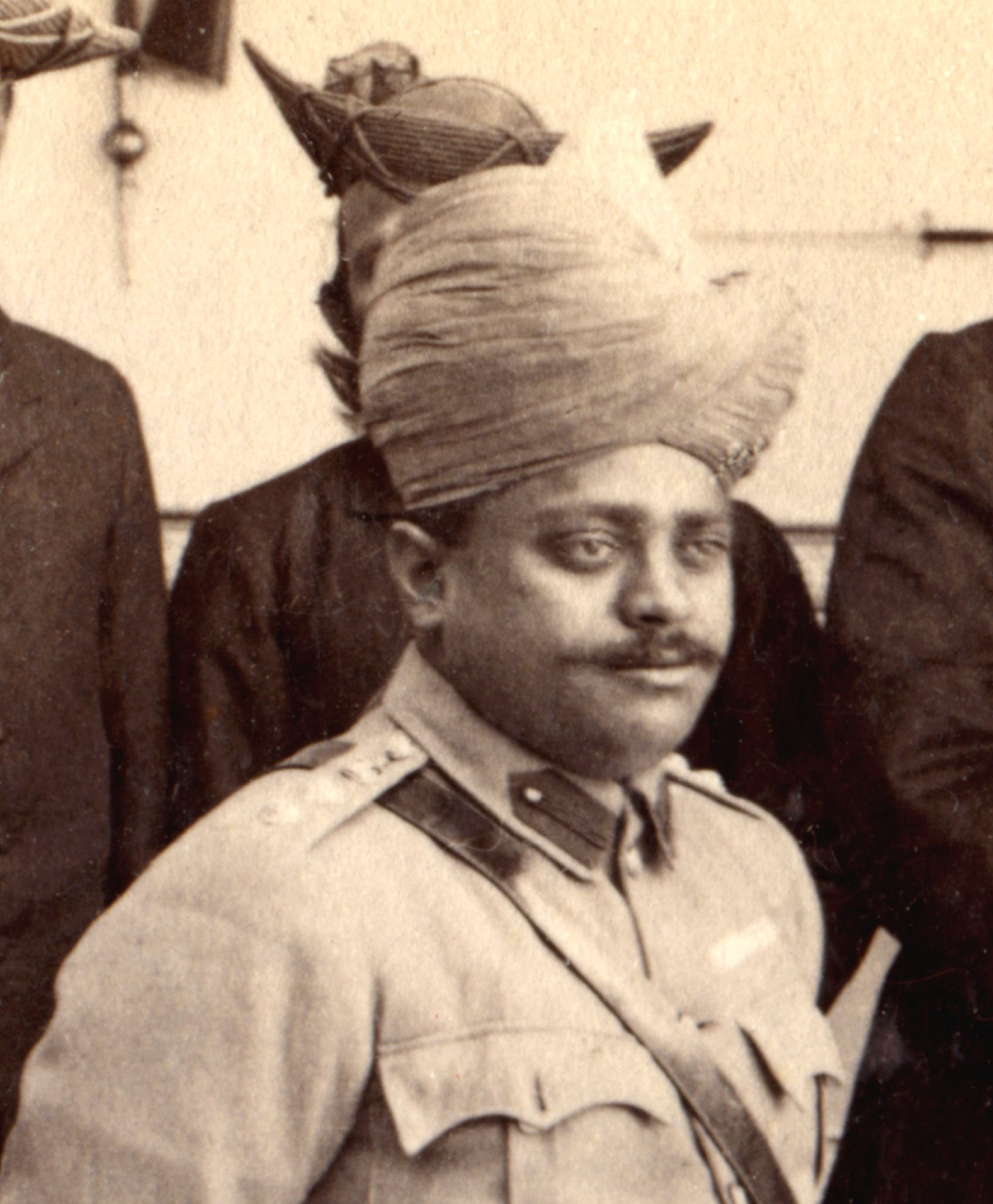
Founder, Madho Rao Scindia I, Maharaja of Gwalior State

The Scindia School was established in 1897 as the Sardar's School by Maharaja Madho Rao Scindia. In 1908, the school was relocated to its current campus on the Gwalior Fort. It merged with a military school around this time and began operating under an endowment. In 1933, the Regency Council of Gwalior renamed the school to "The Scindia School" and restructured it with a broader educational vision. The school is currently managed by a Board of Governors, chaired by Jyotiraditya Scindia.

== Campus ==
The school is spread across a campus covering 160 acres. Buildings in the campus were built during the time of East India Company's reign. Typically, a British Barracks parts of which were converted into classrooms and hostels. The school has an amphitheater that was constructed in 1934 during Principal Mr. FG Pierce tenure.

== Notable alumni ==
- Mukesh Ambani
- Sunil Bharti Mittal
- Salman Khan
- Arbaaz Khan
- Sooraj R. Barjatya
- Anurag Kashyap
- Abhinav Kashyap
- Neil Nitin Mukesh
- Nitin Mukesh
- Manmeet Singh
- Harmeet Singh
- Ameen Sayani
- Jalal Agha
- Raj Zutsi
- Kushal Tandon
- Vikas Kalantri
- Shadab Kamal
- Anil Mehta
- Madhavrao Scindia
- Lord Aamir Ali Bhatia
- Vikram Misri
- Kalyan Banerjee
- Shiv Shankar Menon
- Rajendra Pawar
- Jitendra Singh
- K. Natwar Singh
- Pavan Varma
- Om Prakash Mehra
- Pratap Chandra Lal
- Pusapati Ashok Gajapati Raju
- Abhay Firodia
- Anurag Mathur
- Ananda Shankar

== See also ==
- Sherwood College
- Scindia Kanya Vidyalaya
- Daly College
- Mayo College
- Rajkumar College, Rajkot
- Woodstock School
- The Doon School
- Welham Girls' School
- Dhirubhai Ambani International School
