= Dirk ter Haar =

Anglo-Dutch physicist (1919–2002)

- Born: April 19, 1919; Oosterwolde, Friesland, Netherlands
- Died: September 3, 2002 (aged 83); Drachten, Netherlands
- Education: Leiden University
- Children: 3
- Scientific career
- Fields: Physics
- Workplaces: University of St. Andrews; University of Oxford
- Thesis: Studies on the origin of the Solar System (1948)
- Academic advisors: Hendrik Kramers
- Doctoral students: Anthony James Leggett; Deng Jiaxian

Dirk ter Haar FRSE FIP DSc (Dutch pronunciation: [ˈdɪr(ə)k tɛr ˈɦaːr]; 19 April 1919 –3 September 2002) was an Anglo-Dutch physicist. He was emeritus fellow of University of Oxford.

== Life ==
Dirk ter Haar was born at Oosterwolde in Friesland in the north of the Netherlands on 19 April 1919. He studied physics as an undergraduate at the Leiden University. In 1946 he was a research fellow of Niels Bohr at the Institute for Theoretical Physics in Copenhagen (now the Niels Bohr Institute), and returned to Leiden in 1948 to obtain his PhD. His supervisor was Hendrik Kramers and his PhD dissertation was on the origin of the Solar System. From 1947 to 1950 he was a visiting associate professor of physics at Purdue University.

In 1950 he obtained a post as professor of physics at the University of St. Andrews, and later became a British citizen. In 1952 he was elected a Fellow of the Royal Society of Edinburgh. His proposers were Jack Allen, David Jack, Daniel Edwin Rutherford and Edward Thomas Copson.

He became a Fellow and Senior Tutor of Magdalen College, Oxford and Reader in theoretical physics at the University of Oxford.

In 1966, Ter Haar became a corresponding member of the Royal Netherlands Academy of Arts and Sciences.

Many prominent scientists were PhD students under Ter Haar, including Anthony James Leggett, winner of the Nobel Prize in Physics in 2003, and Deng Jiaxian, one of the leading scientists and founders of Chinese nuclear weapons programs.

Dirk could read Russian, and played a prominent role in disseminating the works of Soviet physicists such as Lev Landau and Pyotr Kapitsa to the western world. He also translated the classic monograph Quantum Mechanics by Alexander Davydov into English.

He retired from his positions at Oxford in 1986, and died in Drachten in Friesland on 3 September 2002.

== Family ==
In 1949 Dirk ter Haar married Christine Janet Lound and together they had two sons and a daughter. His daughter, Gail ter Haar, became a reader in physics as well, specializing in therapeutic ultrasound.

== Works ==
He wrote numerous books on physics, such as Elements of Statistical Mechanics (1954). In addition, he wrote a book on Kramers and was a founding editor for Physics Letters (1962) (later Physics Letters A) and Physics Reports (1971). In 1984 the book Essays in Theoretical Physics in honour of Dirk ter Haar was published in honour of his work in statistical physics and quantum mechanics.

- D. ter Haar, Elements of Statistical Mechanics. London: Constable (1954). 2ed (1966) New York: Holt, Rinehart & Winston; 3ed (1995) Oxford: Butterworth-Heinemann
- D. ter Haar and H.N.S. Wergeland, Elements of Thermodynamics, Addison-Wesley, 1966
- D. ter Haar, Elements of Hamiltonian Mechanics, Pergamon Press, Oxford.
- D. ter Haar, The Old Quantum Theory, Pergamon Press, Oxford, 1967.
- D. ter Haar, "On the Origin of the Solar System", Annual Review of Astronomy and Astrophysics, Vol.5, Oxford, 1967:267-278, doi:10.1146/annurev.aa.05.090167.001411.
- D. ter Haar, Lectures on Selected Topics in Statistical Mechanics, Pergamon Press, Oxford, 1977.
- D. ter Haar, Master of Modern Physics. The Scientific Contributions of H. A. Kramers, Princeton University Press, 1998.
