= Anurag Dikshit =

Indian businessman

- Born: 1973 (age 52–53); Jharkhand, India
- Education: IIT Delhi
- Occupation: Businessman
- Years active: 1990s-present
- Organization: Kusuma Trust

Anurag Dikshit (/ˈdɪksɪt/; born 1973) is an Indian businessman. In 2006, Dikshit became head of the online poker company PartyGaming's research and special projects.

By 2009, Forbes described him as a billionaire. In connection with PartyGaming, in 2009 he pled guilty to one count of online gambling in violation of the Federal Wire Act and received a $300 million fine. After selling 23% of his stake in the company's initial public offering, and a further two-thirds, in October 2009, he sold the remainder of his stake in PartyGaming in 2010.

== Early life and education ==
Anurag Dikshit was born in October 1971. He was born in Jharkhand, India. He spent his childhood going to school in the town of Dhanbad. He completed schooling at De Nobili School, FRI.

He has a bachelor's degree in computer science and engineering from IIT Delhi. He graduated in 1994, and afterwards moved to the United States to work as a software developer.

== Career ==
=== CMC and AT&T ===
Following graduation, Dikshit worked as a software developer in the United States at CMC, as a systems analyst, and later for Websci and AT&T as a consultant.

=== PartyGaming board ===
In 1997, he and his college fellow alumni Vikrant Bhargava founded PartyPoker.com, with American Ruth Parasol hiring Dikshit to write the software in 1998. In 2005, Dikshit hired Bhargava for additional projects.

At age 25, Dikshit was asked by Parasol to write the betting software for her company Starluck Casino. He joined in 1998, one year after it was founded by Parasol, and wrote the software that "allowed gamblers in different parts of the world to pay poker with one another." Starluck Casino was launched as PartyPoker in 2001 after Dikshit and Parasol switched their focus from roulette and blackjack to poker. Since online gambling was illegal in the US at the time, the company's servers and offices were based in Gibraltar, where Dikshit settled.

The company floated on the London Stock Exchange in June 2005, with Dikshit earning a significant sum due to owning a considerable portion of the company. In May 2006 Dikshit stepped down from PartyGaming's board of directors and took a position as head of the company's research and special projects. In that position, he developed new products but largely stepped back from media appearances. He also became PartyGaming's chief operations officer.

=== Fine and exiting PartyGaming ===
In 2008, he ranked No. 701 on the Forbes list of the World's Billionaires, and had a net worth of $1 billion. By 2008, he remained the largest individual shareholder of PartyGaming with 27% of the stock, even after selling 23%.

Becoming the "first high-profile internet gambling tycoon to willingly face justice in a US court," according to The Guardian, after traveling to New York, in December 2008, Dikshit entered a guilty plea to one count of online gambling in violation of the Federal Wire Act and agreed to forfeit $300 million. "I came to believe there was a high probability it was in violation of U.S. laws", Dikshit told U.S. District Judge Jed S. Rakoff in New York, referring to PartyGaming's activity. At the time, he still owned approximately 28% of the company's shares, equal at the time to about $300 million. He paid off the fine in June 2009.

After having sold 23% of his stake in the IPO years earlier, he sold a further two-thirds in October 2009. He sold off the remainder of his stake in PartyGaming in January 2010. According to Forbes, he donated the proceeds from the sales to the Kusuma Trust, a charity he'd founded several years prior to aid at-risk children. Although he'd faced a maximum of two years in jail, in 2010, he was given a one-year probation.

=== Kusuma Trust ===
According to The Telegraph, in 2010, Dikshit and the Sainsbury family were Britain's biggest donors, both giving away over £100 million that year.

In 2013, he had been an early funder of Next Education Private Limited in Hyderabad.

By 2014, he had transferred around £172.4 million to his fund the Kusuma Trust, registered in Gibraltar. That year, the Ministry of Home Affairs in India stalled a transfer of funds from the Kusuma Trust to Amnesty International India. Amnesty did not have the necessary registration to receive funds from abroad, with the matter put under inquiry. At the time, Kusuma funded 10 organisations related to the field of education. In 2023, he remains a trustee at Kusuma Trust.

== Personal life ==
In 2023, he and his wife lived with their two children in London. As a citizen of India, in 2008, he was also a resident of the United Kingdom and Gibraltar, having first set up a residence in Gibraltar in 2001.

Dikshit and his wife set up the Kusuma Gallery, sponsored through the Kusuma Trust, at the V&A’s Photography Centre in 2023.

== See also ==
- List of IIT Delhi people
- List of British Indians § Business and industry
- List of people from Jharkhand
