= Coforge =

Indian multinational technology company

Coforge Ltd.
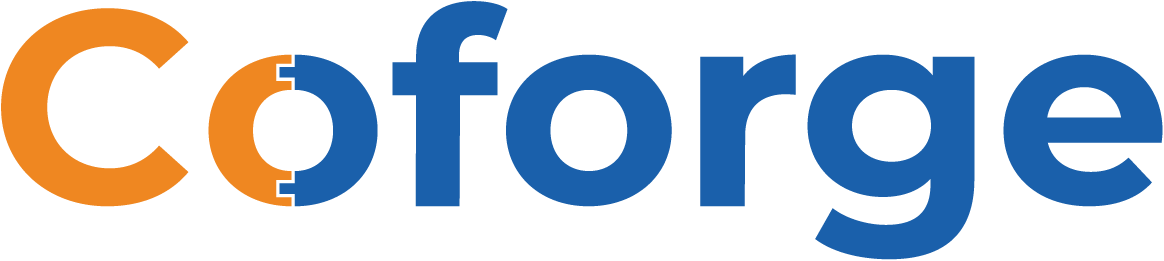

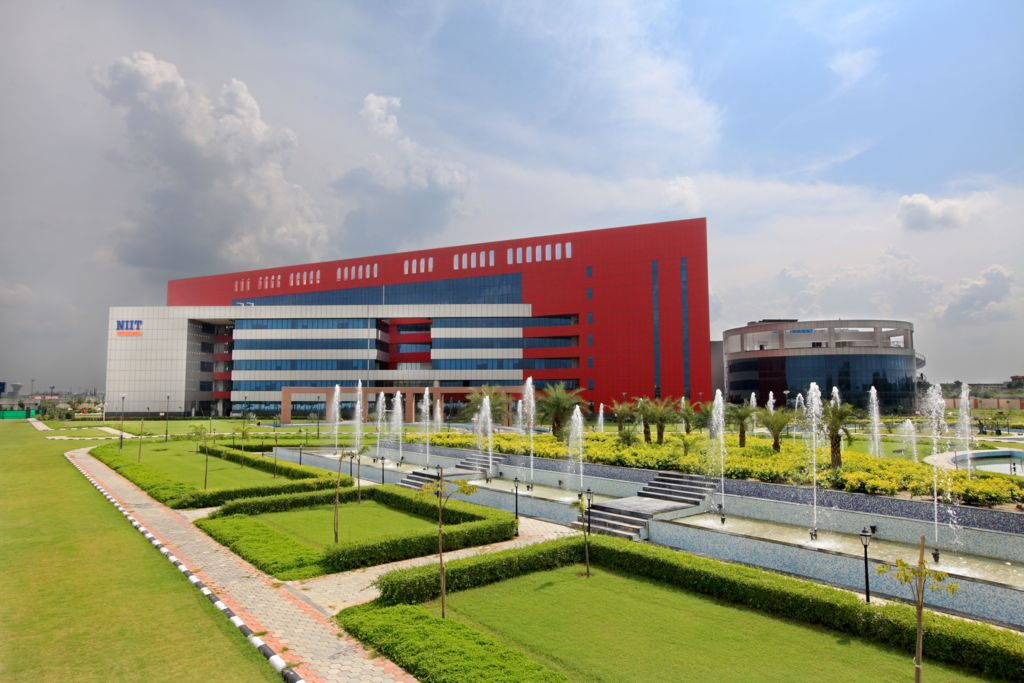
- Coforge headquarters in Greater Noida
- Formerly: NIIT Technologies
- Type: Public
- Traded as: BSE: 532541; NSE: COFORGE
- ISIN: INE591G01017
- Industry: Information technology
- Founded: 13 May 1992; 34 years ago
- Headquarters: Noida, Uttar Pradesh, India
- Area served: Worldwide
- Key people: Sudhir Singh (CEO)
- Services: Digital supply chain; Artificial intelligence; Cloud infrastructure; Data management; Enterprise applications
- Revenue: ▲₹16,403 crore (US$1.7 billion) (2026)
- Operating income: ▲₹2,936 crore (US$300 million) (2026)
- Net income: ▲₹1,745 crore (US$180 million) (2026)
- Number of employees: 20,497 (2025)
- Subsidiaries: Encora
- Website: www.coforge.com
- Footnotes; Financials as of 31 March 2025.

Coforge Limited, formerly known as NIIT Technologies Limited, is an Indian multinational information technology company based in Noida, Uttar Pradesh, India. The company provides digital transformation, consulting, and IT services to industries such as banking, financial services and insurance (BFSI), travel and transportation, healthcare, manufacturing, and government.

The company's stock trades on the Bombay Stock Exchange and on the National Stock Exchange of India under the ticker symbol COFORGE.

== History ==
The company was incorporated in 1992 as NIIT Technologies Ltd, the software services division of NIIT.

In 2006, the company acquired UK Insurance Solutions Company. In the same year company partnered with Adecco SA. In 2008, the company signed a multi-million-pounds deal with British Airways.

In 2012, the company implemented "Intranet Prahari" project for Border Security Force approved by the Government of India. In the same year, Indian Tobacco Board awarded a contract to the company for the implementation of e-auction system in Karnataka and Andhra Pradesh.

In September 2012, the company launched Crew Wings, an application for Airline Cabin Crew Members. In the same year, the company acquired Sabre Holdings' Philippines Development Center.

In 2018, the Company acquired controlling interest in RuleTek, a US-based BPM architecture services company. After the acquisition, Coforge's digital arm Incessant Technologies controls 55% of Ruletek.

In April 2019, Baring Private Equity Asia acquired a 30.6% stake in NIIT Technologies from the promoter group for ₹2,627 crore. In July 2019, Baring increased its shareholding by 35% via an open offer to public shareholders for ₹3,045 crore.

In 2020, NIIT Technologies was re-branded as Coforge.

In April 2021, Coforge acquired 60% stake in SLK Global Solutions for ₹918 crore. After this acquisition, the company's employee count rose to 21,000 having inherited SLK's employee strength of 10,000.

By August 2023, Baring Private Equity Asia divested its entire 70% stake in Coforge, selling it across multiple tranches beginning in October 2020.
