= Leggett inequality =

Experimentally violated inequality of correlations of entangled particles

In physics, the Leggett inequalities, named for Anthony James Leggett, who derived them, are a related pair of mathematical expressions concerning the correlations of properties of entangled particles. (As published by Leggett, the inequalities were exemplified in terms of relative angles of elliptical and linear polarizations.)

== Inequalities ==
They are fulfilled by a large class of physical theories based on particular non-local and realistic assumptions, that may be considered to be plausible or intuitive according to common physical reasoning.

The Leggett inequalities are violated by quantum mechanical theory. The results of experimental tests in 2007 and 2010 have shown agreement with quantum mechanics rather than the Leggett inequalities. Given that experimental tests of Bell's inequalities have ruled out local realism in quantum mechanics, the violation of Leggett's inequalities is considered to have falsified realism in quantum mechanics. In quantum mechanics "realism" means "notion that physical systems possess complete sets of definite values for various parameters prior to, and independent of, measurement".

== See also ==
- CHSH inequality
- Leggett–Garg inequality
