= Yogesh Chander Deveshwar =

Indian businessman (1947–2019)

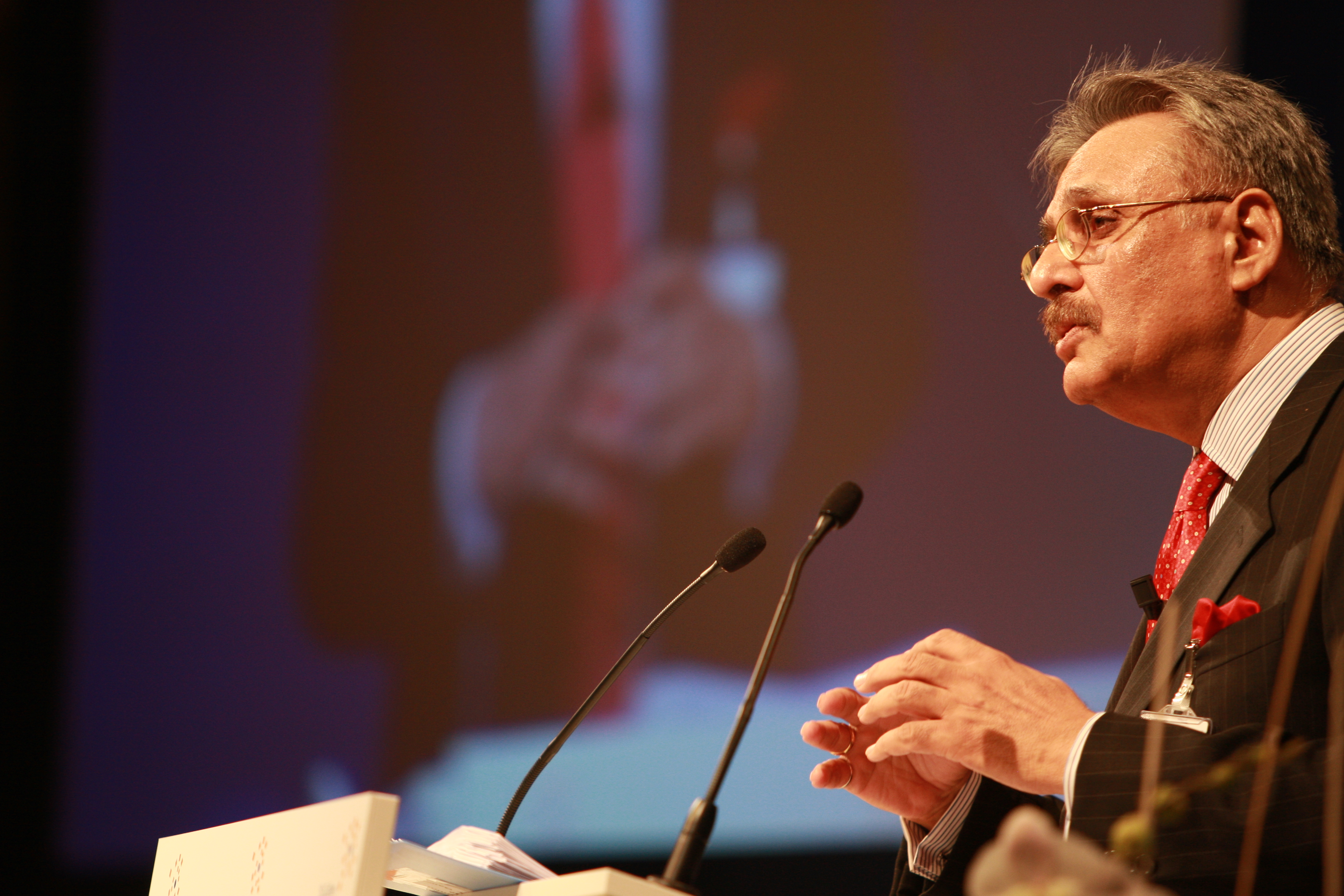
- Deveshwar in 2008

Chairman and CEO of ITC Limited
- In office 1996–2017
- Succeeded by: Sanjiv Puri

Chairman and MD of Air India
- In office 1991–1994

Personal details
- Born: 4 February 1947 Lahore, British India
- Died: 11 May 2019 (aged 72)
- Education: IIT Delhi
- Occupation: Businessman

Yogesh Chander Deveshwar (4 February 1947 – 11 May 2019) was an Indian businessman. He was the chairman of ITC Limited. He was the longest-serving CEO of any Indian company.

== Early life ==
Yogesh Chander Deveshwar was born on 4 February 1947 in Lahore, British India. He received a bachelor's degree in mechanical engineering from the Indian Institute of Technology, Delhi in 1968. He later attended the six-week Advanced Management Program at Harvard Business School.

== Career ==
Deveshwar joined ITC Limited in 1968. He was appointed a main board director in 1984 and became the CEO and chairman in January 1996. Deveshwar was due to step down as head of ITC in 2010.

He was a director on the central board of the Reserve Bank of India, a member of the National Foundation for Corporate Governance, and a member of the governing body of the National Council of Applied Economic Research.

Deveshwar was India's longest-serving CEO at the time of his death, and earned nearly triple the second-highest salary in his company. In 2011, it was reported that his salary was 26 lakh (2.6 million) rupees per month. In 2013, he was listed as the best performing CEO in India by Harvard Business Review and seventh in the world. He served as the president of the Confederation of Indian Industry in 2005-06. In 2011, Deveshwar received the Padma Bhushan, India's third-highest civilian award.

== Death ==
Deveshwar died on 11 May 2019, and although the immediate cause of death was not announced, it was known that he had been diagnosed with cancer a few years before.

== See also ==
- List of IIT Delhi people
