= Vikrant Bhargava =

Indian businessman

- Born: 14 December 1972 (age 53); Jaipur, India
- Education: Indian Institute of Technology Delhi; Indian Institute of Management Calcutta
- Occupation: Businessman
- Known for: Co-founder of PartyGaming, company responsible for PartyPoker
- Spouse: Surbhi Virmani

Vikrant Bhargava (विक्रान्त भार्गव; born 14 December 1972) is an Indian-born British businessman, and the co-founder and former marketing director of online casino operator PartyGaming.

== Early life and education ==
Bhargava was born on 14 December 1972 in Jaipur, India, and raised in Rajasthan.

He holds a bachelor's degree in Technology in electrical engineering from IIT Delhi, where he met his future business partner Anurag Dikshit. He also studied at the Indian Institute of Management, Calcutta.

== Career ==
Prior to joining PartyGaming, Bhargava was a credit officer at Bank of America, responsible for managing credit exposure and revenue for corporate clients, and a business analyst in the business development division of British Gas.

Bhargava joined PartyGaming (formerly iGlobalMedia) as marketing director in early 2000. In July 2001, he oversaw the marketing for the launch of PartyPoker, as well as for Partygaming when it went public in 2005, at the time the London Stock Exchange's largest IPO of an internet company, valued at over $8.5 billion.

In 2005, he owned 15% of PartyGaming, estimated at £450 million.

In May 2006, Bhargava announced he would leave the company's board of directors at the end of the year. He also stepped down from his executive role in the company. Quoted in eGaming Review, John Shepherd, director of PartyGaming corporate communications, credited Bhargava with transforming PartyGaming into a multi-billion pound company. When he left PartyGaming, Bhargava's fortune was estimated to be £850 million. ($1.6 billion at that time)

Bhargava later became the head of a private investment company, Veddis Ventures, registered in Gibraltar. According to the Electoral Commission, Bhargava has donated around £200,000 to the Conservative Party via two of his companies, Stellite Finance and Aria Properties.

In 2018, he founded FIRST UK, which aims to get more students interested in STEM through robotics.

== Personal life ==
He is married to Surbhi Virmani, a cosmetic dermatologist and anesthesiologist.

== See also ==
- List of IIT Delhi people
