= Vajja Sambasiva Rao =

Indian academic (born 1953)

V. S. Rao
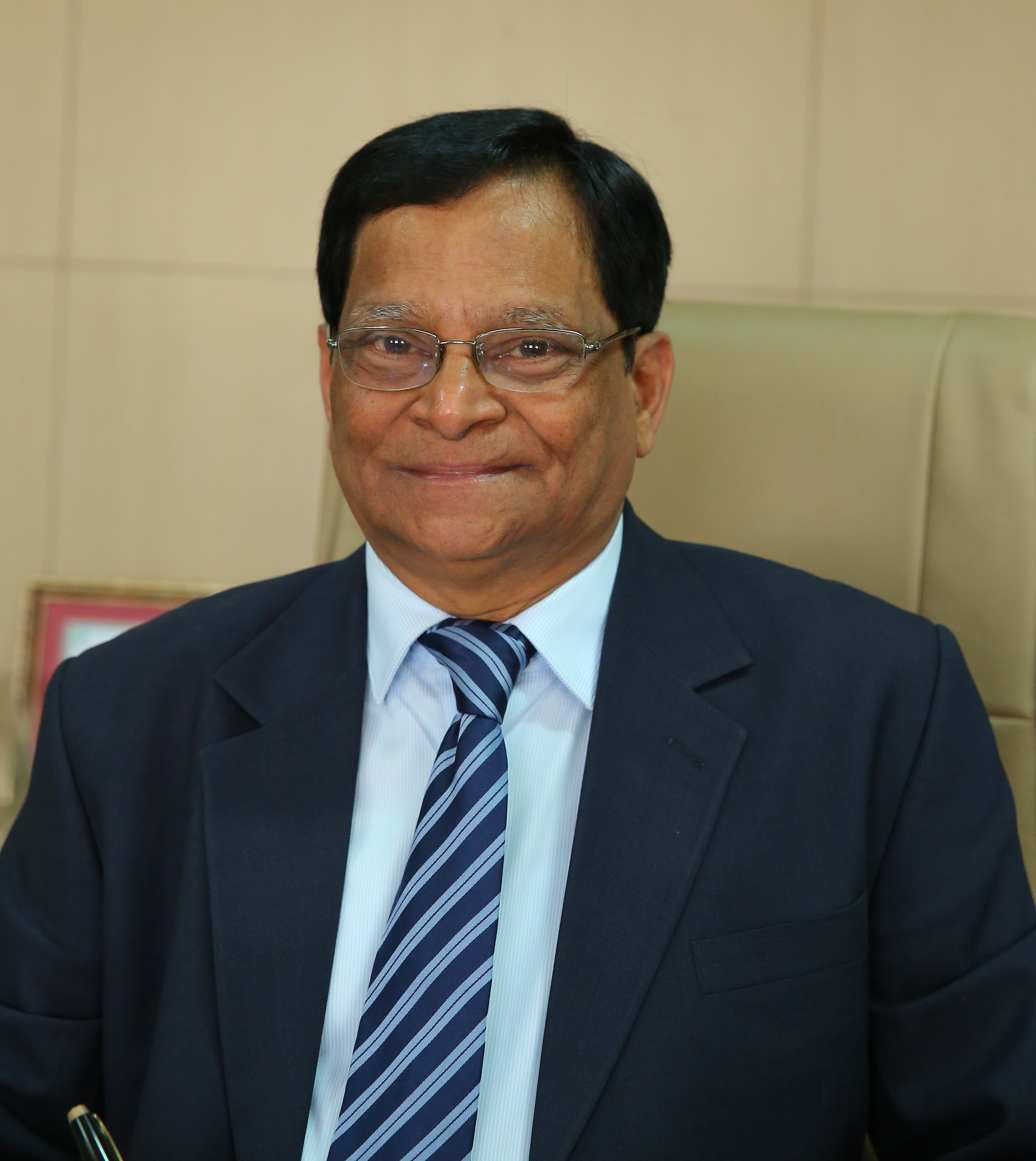

Personal details
- Born: Vajja Sambasiva Rao; 21 January 1953 (age 73) Thullur, Andhra Pradesh, India
- Spouse: Parvathi Vajja
- Education: Andhra University; BITS-Pilani; Bielefeld University
- Profession: College administrator, Academic

Vajja Sambasiva Rao, also known as V. S. Rao (born 21 January 1953) is an Indian academic and the former President of NIIT University. Relinquishing his position at NIIT University on 30 June 2020, he embraced the role of Vice-Chancellor at SRM University-AP, Andhra Pradesh from 1 July 2020. He was previously the Acting Vice-Chancellor of BITS Pilani, and the Director of the Hyderabad Campus of the university. He was responsible for establishing BITS Hyderabad campus. He is an alumnus of BITS Pilani and had been associated with the university for more than four decades in various capacities. As director, he was regarded as being instrumental in the establishment of the Hyderabad Campus.

== Early life and education ==
Rao was born on 21 January 1953 in a village named Thullur, situated in the Guntur district of Andhra Pradesh. He was born to Vajja Venkatapathi and Vajja Anasuyamma, farmers by profession. After finishing his 10th grade at KVR ZP High School in Thullur, he went on to complete his higher secondary education at Andhra-Christian College, Guntur. Later, he pursued graduate studies at the same college and received B.Sc. (Chemistry) degree from Andhra University in 1972.

After graduation, Rao joined BITS Pilani in Rajasthan in 1972 and went on to receive M.Sc. (Chemistry) and PhD (Chemistry) degrees, in 1974 and 1979 respectively, from there. His fields of specializations include organic chemistry, drug design and synthesis, and green chemistry. Rao also obtained a certificate in Educational Economics and Research from Bielefeld University, Germany in 1998.

== Academic career ==
Rao began his academic career in 1980 as an Assistant Lecturer at BITS Pilani, Rajasthan. He was later promoted as assistant professor, associate professor and professor, in 1982, 1990 and 1995 respectively. The courses taught by him included Organic Chemistry, Structure and Reactivity of Organic Compounds, Synthetic Organic Chemistry, and Stereo Chemistry and Reaction Mechanisms.

In addition to academic responsibilities, Rao also held offices in administrative capabilities. He was an in charge of the Practice School Division of the university from 1980 to 1988. From 1988 to 1995, he was the Chief Warden of the university. In 1995, Rao was appointed as the dean of the Practice School Division and held the office till 2006 along with holding the office of deputy director, off-campus programmes from 2000 to 2006.

In 2006, Rao assumed the office of director, BITS-Pilani, Hyderabad Campus. He is regarded as playing a pivotal role in the construction and the establishment of the campus in Hyderabad. The Phase-I of the construction of the campus was finished in 2014 with the inauguration of the auditorium. The entirely residential campus houses 3000 students and 160 faculty members in 13 departments.

In 2013, he was awarded the Eminent Educationist Award by Indo Global Educational Council. He was also honored by Telugu Association of North America (TANA), USA for contribution to excellence in education in 2013.

After the end of the five-year tenure of Prof. Bijendra Nath Jain as the vice-chancellor of the BITS-Pilani University, Prof. V. S. Rao took over the charge as Acting Vice-Chancellor on 31 July 2015. For that period, he executed his duties as both Vice-Chancellor of the university and as Director of BITS, Hyderabad Campus.

On 23 May 2016, it was announced that Prof. Rao would be joining NIIT University as its new President. He was succeeded by Prof. Souvik Bhattacharya as Vice-Chancellor of BITS-Pilani. Prof G. Sundar succeeded him as Director of Hyderabad Campus.

== See also ==
- Birla Institute of Technology and Science
- Birla Institute of Technology and Science, Pilani – Hyderabad
- Kumar Mangalam Birla
- GD Birla
- List of BITS alumni
