= Anupam Garg =

American physicist

- Born: 17 August 1956 (age 70); Amritsar, India
- Education: IIT Delhi; Cornell University
- Known for: Leggett–Garg inequality
- Scientific career
- Fields: Physics
- Workplaces: Northwestern University
- Doctoral advisor: N. David Mermin

Anupam Garg is a professor in the department of Physics & Astronomy at Northwestern University, Illinois. He was born on August 17, 1956 in Amritsar, India. He received a Master's degree from IIT Delhi in 1977, and a Ph.D. in 1983 from Cornell University. In 2012, he became a Fellow of the American Physical Society thanks to his work on molecular magnetism and macroscopic quantum phenomena.

Garg is best known for formulating the Leggett–Garg inequality, named for Anthony James Leggett and himself, which is a mathematical inequality fulfilled by all macrorealistic physical theories. He is also known for the Garg-Onuchic-Ambegaokar model of charge transfer. In addition, he discovered the phenomenon of topological quenching of the tunnel splitting in a toy Hamiltonian for spin tunneling, that was subsequently found experimentally in the magnetic molecule Fe8.

Garg's initial work on spin tunnelling was based on an early and incomplete understanding of spin path integrals, and the experiments on Fe8 led him to an extensive study of the larger field of coherent state path integrals, especially as they pertain to quantum and semi-classical phenomena associated with the orientation of quantum mechanical spin. With his collaborators, Garg has made several original contributions to this field: (1) It was discovered that there is a global anomaly in the integral over the fluctuations around the classical path, whose resolution was also discovered. This resolution means that the Gaussian fluctuations in the semiclassical approximation to the quantum mechanical propagator are unambiguously and completely found, irrespective of which correspondence between the quantum and classical Hamiltonians is employed. (2) The experiments on Fe8 did not agree with the initial theoretical predictions in details such as the locations and the number of quenching points. These discrepancies were completely resolved by the discovery that it was necessary to include classical paths with discontinuities at their end points.

Garg is the author of a graduate physics textbook, Classical Electromagnetism in a Nutshell, and an undergraduate text, Mathematics with a Scientific Sensibility.

== See also ==
- List of textbooks in electromagnetism
