= Vijay K. Thadani =

Indian businessman (born 1951)

- Born: 1951 (age 74–75)
- Education: Bachelor of Technology, Electrical Engineering
- Alma mater: Indian Institute of Technology, Delhi: Class of 1972
- Occupations: CEO, NIIT
- Employer: NIIT
- Known for: Co-founder of NIIT

Vijay K. Thadani (born 1951) is an Indian businessman who co-founded NIIT and NIIT University along with Rajendra S. Pawar in 1981 and 2009 respectively. He is the managing director of the company. He is an alumnus of Indian Institute of Technology, Delhi.

He has been actively engaged with many industry associations.

He was President of the Indian IT industry association, MAIT, and also chaired the Indian Government's Committee on National Information Infrastructure Policy.

He was chairman of the IT Committee, Confederation of Indian Industry (CII) in the USA

He is the chairman of CII National Committee on Education and the Chairman of the National Accreditation Board for Education and Training (NABET), which works under the aegis of the Quality Council of India

He is on the board of CompTIA USA, an association advancing the global interests of the information technology industry, and also as a member of the India Advisory Board of the Maastricht University, Netherlands

Recently appointed as a member of the Strategy Council of Global Alliance for ICT and Development of the United Nations Department of Economic and Social Affairs (UNDESA-GAID)

A 'Distinguished Alumnus of the premier Indian Institute of Technology, Delhi, Vijay was honored with the position of 'Economic Consultant' to Chongqing, the world's largest city in the People's Republic of China.
