= Sanket Goel =

Indian engineer and academic

- संकेत गोयल
- Education: University of Alberta (PhD); Indian Institute of Technology Delhi (MSc); University of Delhi (BSc)
- Scientific career
- Fields: MEMS, microfluidics, nanoelectronics
- Workplaces: University of Manitoba (2026–present); BITS Pilani, Hyderabad Campus (2015–2026); University of Petroleum and Energy Studies (2011–2015); Agency for Science, Technology and Research (2008–2011); Stanford University (2006–2008)
- Thesis: Optobiochips for Microcytometry (2006)

Sanket Goel is an Indian engineer and academic who is a professor and an Eddie Goldenberg Research Chair of Canada at the University of Manitoba. His research is on miniaturised sensing, diagnostic and energy devices based on MEMS and microfluidics. In 2026 he was elected a Fellow of Optica. From 2015 to 2026 he was at BITS Pilani, Hyderabad Campus, where he was the founding head of the Center for Research Excellence in Semiconductor Technologies. He received India's National Award to Teachers in 2025.

== Education ==
Goel received a Bachelor of Science (Honours) in physics from the University of Delhi and a master's degree from the Indian Institute of Technology Delhi. He began doctoral studies at the University of Alberta in 2001 and completed a PhD in electrical engineering in 2006 with a thesis on optobiochips for microcytometry.

== Career ==
Goel was a postdoctoral fellow at the Stanford Genome Technology Center of Stanford University from 2006 to 2008. From 2008 to 2011 he worked in Singapore at the Institute of Microelectronics and the Genome Institute of Singapore, both part of the Agency for Science, Technology and Research (A*STAR). From 2011 to 2015 he was head of research and development and an associate professor at the University of Petroleum and Energy Studies in Dehradun.

In 2015 Goel joined BITS Pilani, Hyderabad Campus as an associate professor and head of the department of electrical and electronics engineering. He later became Birla Chair Professor, served as the institute's Dean of Research and Innovation, and was the founding head of its Center for Research Excellence in Semiconductor Technologies (CREST). At BITS Pilani he led the MEMS, Microfluidics and Nanoelectronics (MMNE) Lab.

In August 2026 Goel was named to the first cohort of the Canadian federal Eddie Goldenberg Research Chairs of Canada programme, as Eddie Goldenberg Research Chair of Canada in Translating Cyber Physical Sensory Systems to Reimagine Health and Prosperity at the University of Manitoba. Five of the chairs went to the University of Manitoba. Goel also joined the university as a professor in its Price Faculty of Engineering.

== Research ==
Goel's research is on miniaturised devices for sensing, diagnostics and energy, built with microfluidics and 3D printing. Devices from his group at BITS Pilani that received press coverage include a PCR device that reduced test times, a low-cost soil nutrient sensor, a 3D-printed sensor that monitors glucose in sweat, and a fibre-optic sensor for brain health monitoring developed with IIT Bombay. In 2025 the group reported a smartwatch-based sensor that measures glucose, uric acid and lactate in sweat, which was being commercialised through Cleome Innovations, a spin-off company from the lab.

== Honours ==
Goel received a Fulbright fellowship in 2015 and a Japan Society for the Promotion of Science invitational fellowship in 2021. The IEEE Sensors Council appointed him a Distinguished Lecturer for 2024–2026. He has served on the editorial boards of the IEEE Sensors Journal and IEEE Transactions on NanoBioscience.

In 2025 he was one of 21 teachers from Indian higher education institutions and polytechnics selected for the National Award to Teachers, which the President of India presented in New Delhi on 5 September 2025.

In October 2026 Optica elected Goel as a Fellow, as part of its 2027 class, for contributions to optofluidic and micro/nano-engineered sensing platforms for point-of-care diagnostics, wearable devices and bio-photonic technologies.

== Selected works ==
- Singh, Sonal; Jain, Shikha; Ps, Venkateswaran; Tiwari, Avanish K.; Nouni, Mansa R.; Pandey, Jitendra K.; Goel, Sanket (1 January 2015). "Hydrogen: A sustainable fuel for future of the transport sector". Renewable and Sustainable Energy Reviews. 51: 623–633. Bibcode:2015RSERv..51..623S. doi:10.1016/j.rser.2015.06.040.
- Kothuru, Avinash; Hanumanth Rao, C.; Puneeth, S. B.; Salve, Mary; Amreen, Khairunnisa; Goel, Sanket (July 2020). "Laser-Induced Flexible Electronics (LIFE) for Resistive, Capacitive and Electrochemical Sensing Applications". IEEE Sensors Journal. 20 (13): 7392–7399. Bibcode:2020ISenJ..20.7392K. doi:10.1109/JSEN.2020.2977694. ISSN 1558-1748. S2CID 216415990.
- Rewatkar, Prakash; Goel, Sanket (October 2018). "Paper-Based Membraneless Co-Laminar Microfluidic Glucose Biofuel Cell With MWCNT-Fed Bucky Paper Bioelectrodes". IEEE Transactions on NanoBioscience. 17 (4): 374–379. Bibcode:2018ITNB...17..374R. doi:10.1109/TNB.2018.2857406. ISSN 1558-2639. PMID 30028713. S2CID 51706033.
- Goel, Sanket, ed. (2021). Microelectronics and Signal Processing: Advanced Concepts and Applications. Taylor & Francis. doi:10.1201/9781003168225. ISBN 9780367640125. S2CID 235504021.
- Goel, Sanket (2023). Miniaturized Electrochemical Devices - Advanced Concepts, Fabrication, and Applications. Taylor & Francis. ISBN 9781032392714.
