= Anthony Leggett =

British–American physicist (1938–2026)

Professor Sir Anthony Leggett KBE FRS HonFInstP
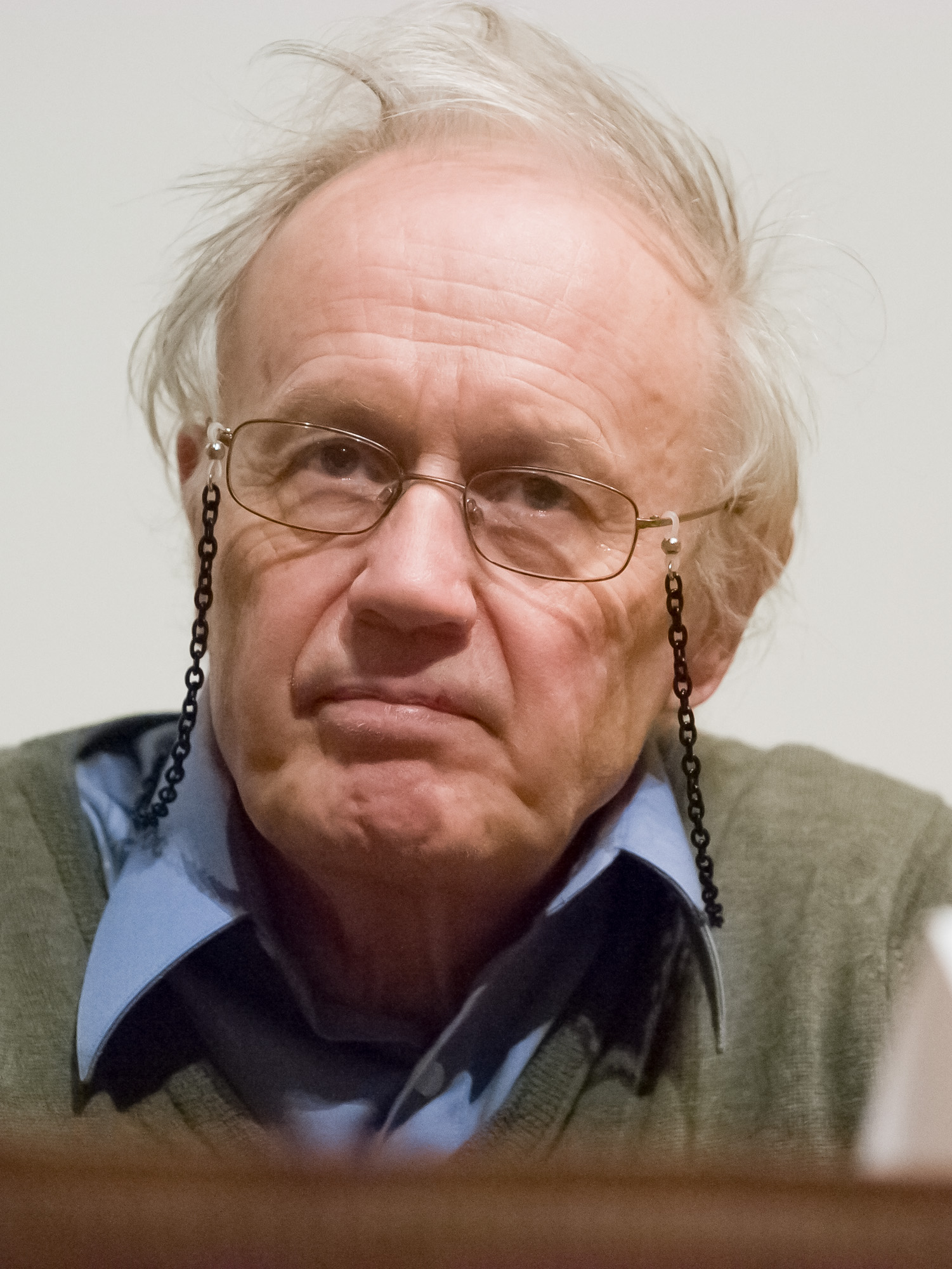
- Leggett in 2007
- Born: Anthony James Leggett; 26 March 1938; Camberwell, London, England
- Died: 8 March 2026 (aged 87); Urbana, Illinois, US
- Citizenship: United Kingdom; United States
- Education: University of Oxford (BA, DPhil)
- Known for: Caldeira–Leggett model of quantum dissipation; Leggett–Garg inequality; Leggett inequality; Superfluid phase of helium-3
- Spouse: Haruko Kinase (m. 1972)
- Awards: Maxwell Medal and Prize (1975); FRS (1980); IOP Dirac Medal (1992); Nobel Prize in Physics (2003); Wolf Prize in Physics (2002); KBE (2004)
- Scientific career
- Fields: Physics
- Workplaces: University of Sussex; University of Waterloo; Institute for Quantum Computing; U of Illinois Urbana-Champaign
- Thesis: Some Problems in the Theory of Many-Body Systems (1964)
- Doctoral advisor: Dirk ter Haar
- Doctoral students: Amir Caldeira; Matthew Fisher; Mohit Randeria

Sir Anthony James Leggett (26 March 1938 – 8 March 2026) was a British–American theoretical physicist and professor at the University of Illinois Urbana-Champaign (UIUC). Leggett was widely recognised as a world leader in the theory of low-temperature physics, and his pioneering work on superfluidity was recognised by the 2003 Nobel Prize in Physics. He shaped the theoretical understanding of normal and superfluid helium liquids and strongly coupled superfluids. He set directions for research in the quantum physics of macroscopic dissipative systems and use of condensed systems to test the foundations of quantum mechanics.

== Early life and education ==
Leggett was born on 26 March 1938, in Camberwell, south London, and raised Catholic. His father's forebears were village cobblers in a small village in Hampshire; Leggett's grandfather broke with this tradition to become a greengrocer. His mother's parents were of Irish descent; her father had moved to Britain and worked as a clerk in the naval dockyard in Chatham. His maternal grandmother, who survived into her eighties, was sent out to domestic service at the age of twelve.

His father and mother were each the first in their families to receive a university education; they met and became engaged while students at the Institute of Education at the University of London, but were unable to get married for some years because his father had to care for his own mother and siblings. His father worked as a secondary school teacher of physics, chemistry and mathematics. His mother also taught secondary school mathematics for a time, but had to give this up when he was born. He was eventually followed by two sisters, Clare and Judith, and two brothers, Terence and Paul, all raised in their parents' Roman Catholic faith. Leggett ceased to be a practising Catholic in his early twenties.

Soon after he was born, his parents bought a house in Upper Norwood, south London. When he was 18 months old, WWII broke out and he was evacuated to Englefield Green, a small village in Surrey on the edge of the great park of Windsor Castle, where he stayed for the duration of the war. After the end of the war, he returned to the Upper Norwood house and lived there until 1950; his father taught at a school in north-east London and his mother looked after the five children full-time. He attended the local Catholic primary school and, following a successful performance in the 11-plus, which he took rather earlier than most, transferred to Wimbledon College.

He later attended Beaumont College, a Jesuit school in Old Windsor. He and his two younger brothers, Terrence and Paul, attended Beaumont as a consequence of his father's appointment to teach science at the college. While there, Leggett primarily studied classics, since that was generally regarded as the most prestigious field at the time; this study led directly to his Greats degree while at Oxford. Despite Leggett's emphasis on classics at Beaumont, his father ran an evening 'science club' for his younger son and a couple of others. In his last year at Beaumont, Leggett won every single prize for the subjects that he studied that year.

Leggett won a scholarship to Balliol College, Oxford, in December 1954 and entered the university the following year with the intention of reading the degree technically known as Literae Humaniores (classics). After completing his first degree he began a second undergraduate degree, this time in physics at Merton College, Oxford. One person who was willing to overlook Leggett's unorthodox credentials was Dirk ter Haar, then a reader in theoretical physics and a fellow of Magdalen College, Oxford; so Leggett signed up for research under ter Haar's supervision. As with all of ter Haar's students in that period, the tentatively assigned thesis topic was "Some Problems in the Theory of Many-Body Systems", which left a considerable degree of latitude.

Dirk took a great interest in the personal welfare of his students and their families, and was meticulous in making sure they received adequate support; indeed, he encouraged Leggett to apply for a Prize Fellowship at Magdalen, which he held from 1963 to 1967. In the end Leggett's thesis consisted of studies of two somewhat disconnected problems in the general area of liquid helium, one on higher-order phonon interaction processes in superfluid ^{4}He and the other on the properties of dilute solutions of ^{4}He in normal liquid ^{3}He (a system which turned out to be much less experimentally accessible than the other side of the phase diagram, dilute solutions of ^{3}He in ^{4}He). The University of Oxford awarded Leggett an Honorary DLitt in June 2005.

== Career ==
Leggett spent the period August 1964 – August 1965 as a postdoctoral research fellow at UIUC, and David Pines and his colleagues (John Bardeen, Gordon Baym, Leo Kadanoff and others) provided a fertile environment. He then spent a year in the group of Professor Takeo Matsubara at Kyoto University in Japan.

After one more postdoctoral year which he spent in "roving" mode, spending time at Oxford, Harvard, and Illinois, in the autumn of 1967 he took up a lectureship at the University of Sussex, where he was to spend the majority of the next fifteen years of his career. During the mid 1970s, he spent considerable time in Japan at the University of Tokyo and also at Kwame Nkrumah University of Science and Technology in Kumasi, Ghana.

In early 1982 he accepted an offer from UIUC of the MacArthur Chair with which the university had recently been endowed. As he had already committed himself to an eight-month stay as a visiting scientist at Cornell in early 1983, he finally arrived in Urbana in the early fall of that year, and remained there for the rest of his career.

Leggett's own research interests shifted away from superfluidity from around 1980 on. He worked inter alia on the low-temperature properties of glasses, high-temperature superconductivity, the Bose–Einstein condensate (BEC) atomic gases, and above all on the theory of experiments to test whether the formation of quantum mechanics will continue to describe the physical world as we push it up from the atomic level towards that of everyday life.

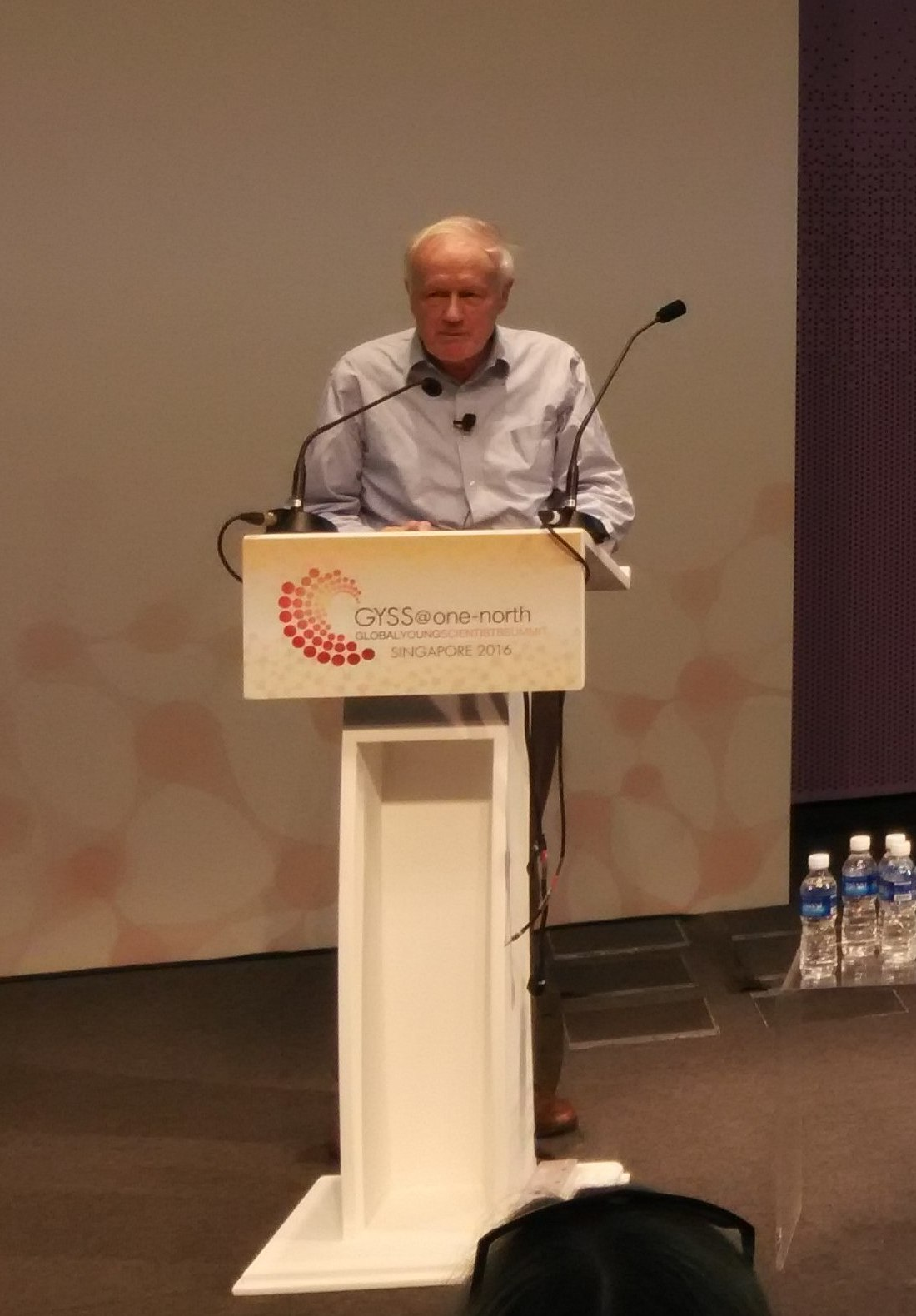
Leggett at the Global Young Scientists Summit in Singapore (2016)

From 2006 to 2016, he also held a position at the Institute for Quantum Computing in Waterloo, Canada.

As of April 2023, he was chief scientist at the Institute for Condensed Matter Theory, a research institute at the UIUC.

In 2013, he became the founding director of the Shanghai Center for Complex Physics.

== Death ==
Leggett died at his home in Urbana, Illinois, on 8 March 2026, at the age of 87.

== Research ==
His research focused on cuprate superconductivity, superfluidity in highly degenerate atomic gases, low temperature properties of amorphous solids, conceptual issues in the formulation of quantum mechanics of fluids and solids and topological quantum computation.

The edition of 29 December 2005 of the International Herald Tribune printed an article, "New tests of Einstein's 'spooky' reality", which referred to Leggett's Autumn 2005 debate at a conference in Berkeley, California, with fellow Nobel laureate Norman Ramsey of Harvard University. Both debated the worth of attempts to change quantum theory. Leggett thought attempts were justified, Ramsey opposed. Leggett believed quantum mechanics may be incomplete because of the quantum measurement problem.

== Awards and honours ==
Leggett was a member of the National Academy of Sciences, the American Philosophical Society, the American Academy of Arts and Sciences, the Russian Academy of Sciences (foreign member), and the American Institute of Physics, and was elected a Fellow of the Royal Society (FRS) in 1980, a Fellow of the American Physical Society in 1985, an Honorary Fellow of the Institute of Physics (HonFInstP) in 1998, and a Foreign Fellow of the Indian National Science Academy in 2011.

Leggett was awarded the 2003 Nobel Prize in Physics (with V. L. Ginzburg and A. A. Abrikosov) for pioneering contributions to the theory of superconductors and superfluids, particularly the superfluidity of helium-3. He was an Honorary Fellow of the Institute of Physics (UK). He was appointed Knight Commander of the Order of the British Empire (KBE) in the 2004 Queen's Birthday Honours "for services to physics". He won the 2002/2003 Wolf Prize in Physics, for research on condensed forms of matter (with B. I. Halperin). He was also honoured with the Eugene Feenberg Memorial Medal (1999).

== Personal life ==
In June 1973, he married Haruko Kinase. They met at Sussex University, in Brighton, England. In 1978, they had a daughter Asako. His wife Haruko earned a PhD in cultural anthropology from UIUC and has done research on the hospice system. Their daughter, Asako, also graduated from UIUC with a joint major in geography and chemistry.

== See also ==
- List of University of Waterloo people
