= Russ DeLeon =

American investor

- Known for: Co-founder of PartyGaming
- Children: 7

James Russell DeLeon is an investor in real estate, technology, media and the arts.

DeLeon is a graduate of UC Berkeley and holds a J. D. from Harvard Law School. He was admitted to the Bar in California in December 1992.

DeLeon joined PartyGaming in August 2001, when the group was launching PartyPoker.com. He was involved in senior management of PartyGaming, including through its June 2005 IPO on the London Stock Exchange until his departure in 2006.

He is married to Dr Kimberley Yoshimi DeLeon.
