= Siddharth Pandey (chemist) =

Indian chemist

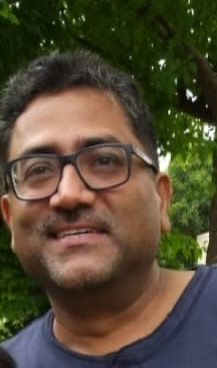
- Born: 6 October 1970 (age 56); Allahabad, Uttar Pradesh, India
- Education: Indian Institute of Technology Kanpur; University of North Texas
- Known for: Experimental physical chemistry, optical spectroscopy
- Awards: Chemical Research Society of India Bronze Medal (2016); Fellow of the Royal Society of Chemistry (2015)
- Scientific career
- Fields: Physical chemistry
- Workplaces: Indian Institute of Technology Delhi
- Doctoral advisor: William E. Acree Jr.

Siddharth Pandey is an Indian chemist and professor working in the field of experimental physical chemistry. He currently serves as the N. K. Jha Chair Professor at the Department of Chemistry, Indian Institute of Technology Delhi (IIT Delhi). He has been a professor at IIT Delhi since April 2011 and previously held the position of Head of the Department from September 2022 to August 2024. He has also served as a visiting professor at the University of Missouri, Columbia, USA. He started his academic career as an assistant professor at New Mexico Tech, USA in 2000.

He earned the Chemical Research Society of India Bronze Medal (2016), Excellence in Teaching Award from IIT Delhi (2012), and was elected as a Fellow of the Royal Society of Chemistry (2015).

== Early life and education ==
Pandey was born in 1970 in Allahabad (now Prayagraj), Uttar Pradesh, India. He completed his school education in Allahabad and secured the first position in the state in the Intermediate Examination conducted by the Uttar Pradesh Board in 1987.

Pandey pursued his Ph.D. in Chemistry at the University of North Texas, where he worked under the supervision of William E. Acree Jr. He later completed his post-doctoral research at the University at Buffalo, State University of New York under the guidance of Frank V. Bright. He holds a Master of Science (5-Year Integrated) degree from the IIT Kanpur, where he conducted research on biprotonic excited-state intermolecular proton transfer in ionic micelles.

== Career ==
Pandey was awarded the N. K. Jha Chair Professorship in 2023 and previously held the Institute Chair Professorship from 2019 to 2023.

== Research ==
His research primarily focuses on optical spectroscopy, excited-state phenomena, optical sensing, and molecularly organized media. He has worked extensively on supercritical fluids, ionic liquids, deep eutectic solvents, fluorous solvents, and renewable solvents. His studies also include photophysics of polymers, biomolecules, and pharmaceuticals, as well as carbon dioxide capture and sequestration. He has served as an editorial board member of Scientific Reports for 10 years and is currently an editor of the Journal of Molecular Liquids.

== Selected publications ==
- Pandey, S. (2006). Analytical applications of room-temperature ionic liquids: A review of recent efforts. Analytica Chimica Acta, 556(1), 38–45. https://doi.org/10.1016/j.aca.2005.10.046
- Baker, G. A., Baker, S. N., Pandey, S., & Bright, F. V. (2005). An analytical view of ionic liquids. Analyst, 130(6), 800–808. https://doi.org/10.1039/b509796g
- Yadav, A., & Pandey, S. (2014). Densities and viscosities of (choline chloride + urea) deep eutectic solvent and its aqueous mixtures in the temperature range 293.15 K to 363.15 K. Journal of Chemical & Engineering Data, 59(7), 2221–2229. https://doi.org/10.1021/je500622y
- Fletcher, K. A., & Pandey, S. (2004). Surfactant aggregation within room-temperature ionic liquid 1-ethyl-3-methylimidazolium bis(trifluoromethylsulfonyl)imide. Langmuir, 20(1), 33–36. https://doi.org/10.1021/la035536z
- Yadav, A., Trivedi, S., Rai, R., & Pandey, S. (2014). Densities and dynamic viscosities of (choline chloride + glycerol) deep eutectic solvent and its aqueous mixtures in the temperature range (283.15–363.15) K. Fluid Phase Equilibria, 367, 135–142. https://doi.org/10.1016/j.fluid.2014.01.005

== Awards and honors ==
- Professor R. D. Desai 80th Birthday Commemoration Medal & Prize Award, Indian Chemical Society, 60th Annual Convention of Chemist 2023 (ACC 2023).
- Distinguished Faculty in Chemistry, 8th Venus International Science and Technology Awards (VISTA 2022), Venus International Foundation, Chennai
- Chemical Research Society of India (CRSI) Bronze Medal (2016).
- Fellow of the Royal Society of Chemistry (FRSC) (March 2015).
- NASI-SCOPUS Young Scientist Award in Chemistry (2009).
