= Vipin Kumar Tripathi =

Indian plasma physicist

Professor Emeritus Vipin Kumar Tripathi
- Born: 11 March 1948 (age 78); Jhansi, India
- Known for: Plasma (physics)

Academic background
- Education: Agra University, IIT Delhi

Academic work
- Discipline: Physics
- Sub-discipline: Plasma
- Notable works: Sadbhav Mission

Vipin Kumar Tripathi (alternately known as VK Tripathi; born 11 March 1948) is an Indian plasma physicist, activist, and a professor emeritus at the Indian Institute of Technology Delhi (IIT Delhi). Known for his contributions to plasma physics, particularly in microwave-plasma interactions and laser-plasma studies, Tripathi has also gained recognition for his social activism through the Sadbhav Mission, which promotes communal harmony and education in India.

== Early life and education ==
Vipin Kumar Tripathi was born on 11 March 1948 to Indian freedom fighter and wrestler Hardas Sharma in Piprai, Jhansi, Uttar Pradesh, India. Raised in a multicultural environment, he was influenced by his father's Muslim mentor Ahmed Baksh, whom he credits for his upbringing, fostering his commitment to social harmony.

He earned his M. S. degree in Physics from Agra University in 1967 and completed his Ph.D. in Physics at IIT Delhi in 1971.

== Academic career ==
Tripathi began his academic career as a lecturer at IIT Delhi in 1970, focusing on the nonlinear interaction of electromagnetic waves with plasmas.

In 1976, he joined the University of Maryland, College Park, as a postdoctoral researcher and later as a research associate, working on radio frequency heating of fusion plasmas.

Returning to IIT Delhi in 1983, he served as a Professor of Physics for nearly three decades, retiring as Professor Emeritus. During his tenure, he established the Plasma Group at IIT Delhi, which conducted pioneering research on gyrotrons, free-electron lasers, laser-plasma interactions, and material processing.

His research contributions include studies on parametric instabilities in laser-produced plasmas, thermonuclear fusion, plasma-aided radiation guiding, and Cherenkov terahertz generation.

Notable publications include works on stimulated Brillouin scattering, plasmonics, and high-power laser-plasma interactions. Tripathi’s Plasma Lab at IIT Delhi, initiated in 1980, developed innovative plasma sources like the Compact ECR Plasma Source (CEPS) and Large Volume Plasma System (LVPS), with applications in semiconductor processing, ion implantation, and waste mitigation. His team also designed high-power microwave components, including coaxial triple stub tuners and low-cost power supplies for plasma applications.

== Activism ==
In 1990, he formed a Forum for Secular Indians in United States which was later named as 'Sadbhav Mission' in response to the Bhagalpur riots, aiming to foster grassroots resistance against communalism and promote education.

Tripathi left the USA saddened by the 1982 Lebanon War, when Israel attacked Lebanon and around 20,000 people were killed and the US supported Israel.

In 1990, when Bharatiya Janata Party started its 'Rath Yatra' with Lal Krishna Advani as the star performer, Tripathi introduced his 'Aatm Manthan Yatra' from Rajghat wherein he along with some volunteers and other supporters distributed around 4,000 flyers across Delhi.

His activism, often conducted single-handedly on the streets of Delhi, has been noted for its dedication to social justice, with Tripathi earning descriptions as a “pamphlet man with a message of peace.” In 2025, he distributed fliers highlighting mass starvation in Gaza, emphasising universal human compassion.

Through the Sadbhav Mission, he has written and distributed pamphlets on issues like the Abrogation of Article 370 and CAA as a mode of protest.

In 2025, VK Tripathi went on a hunger fast at Rajghat and distributed pamphlets related to Gaza war.

== Awards and recognition ==
Tripathi has received several accolades for his academic and social contributions:

• Fellow, Indian National Science Academy (INSA): Recognized for his contributions to plasma physics.

• Fellow, National Academy of Sciences, India (NASI): Honored for his scientific achievements.

• JC Bose Memorial Award, Indian Physics Association: Acknowledged for his research in plasma physics.

• Honorary Professor, Banaras Hindu University: For his contributions to physics education and research.

== Personal life ==
Tripathi is married and has two sons and a daughter, Rakhi Tripathi, who has publicly supported his activism efforts. He resides in Sarvodaya Enclave, Delhi and remains active in both academic and social spheres.

== Selected publications ==
Tripathi's publications include:

- Parametric instabilities in laser produced plasmas.
- Thermonuclear fusion
- Plasma-aided radiation guiding in a free-electron laser
- Stimulated Brillouin scattering of a laser beam in a plasma channel
- Cherenkov Terahertz Generation by Electron Bunches in a Dielectric Lined Resonator
- Theoretical Modeling and Experimental Verification of the Permeability Measurements of Thick Films at Microwave Frequencies
- Laser wakefield bubble regime acceleration of electrons in a preformed non uniform plasma channel
- Plasmonics
- High power laser plasma interaction
- Fundamentals of plasma physics
