= India Splendor =

India Splendor was an arts event and awards ceremony recognising Indians and Indian-Americans, held in Los Angeles, California, running from 10–15 August 2007 and scheduled to coincide with the 60th anniversary of India's independence The event aspired to showcase contemporary Indian cinema, arts, fashion, dance, music and spirituality. India-born tennis star and veteran Hollywood film producer Ashok Amritraj was the cultural ambassador for the event.

== Events ==
The festival featured Indian filmmakers presenting current Indian feature films, including a special tribute to Indian film star, Raj Kapoor. Other highlights included a spiritual discourse by Sri Sri Ravi Shankar, founder of the Art of Living foundation, as well as a fashion show by Indian designer, Suneet Verma. On 15 August at the gala celebration of India's 60th Anniversary of Independence, Indians prominent in their respective fields were the recipients of the India Splendor Awards.
