= Nandu Nandkishore =

Doreswamy "Nandu" Nandkishore
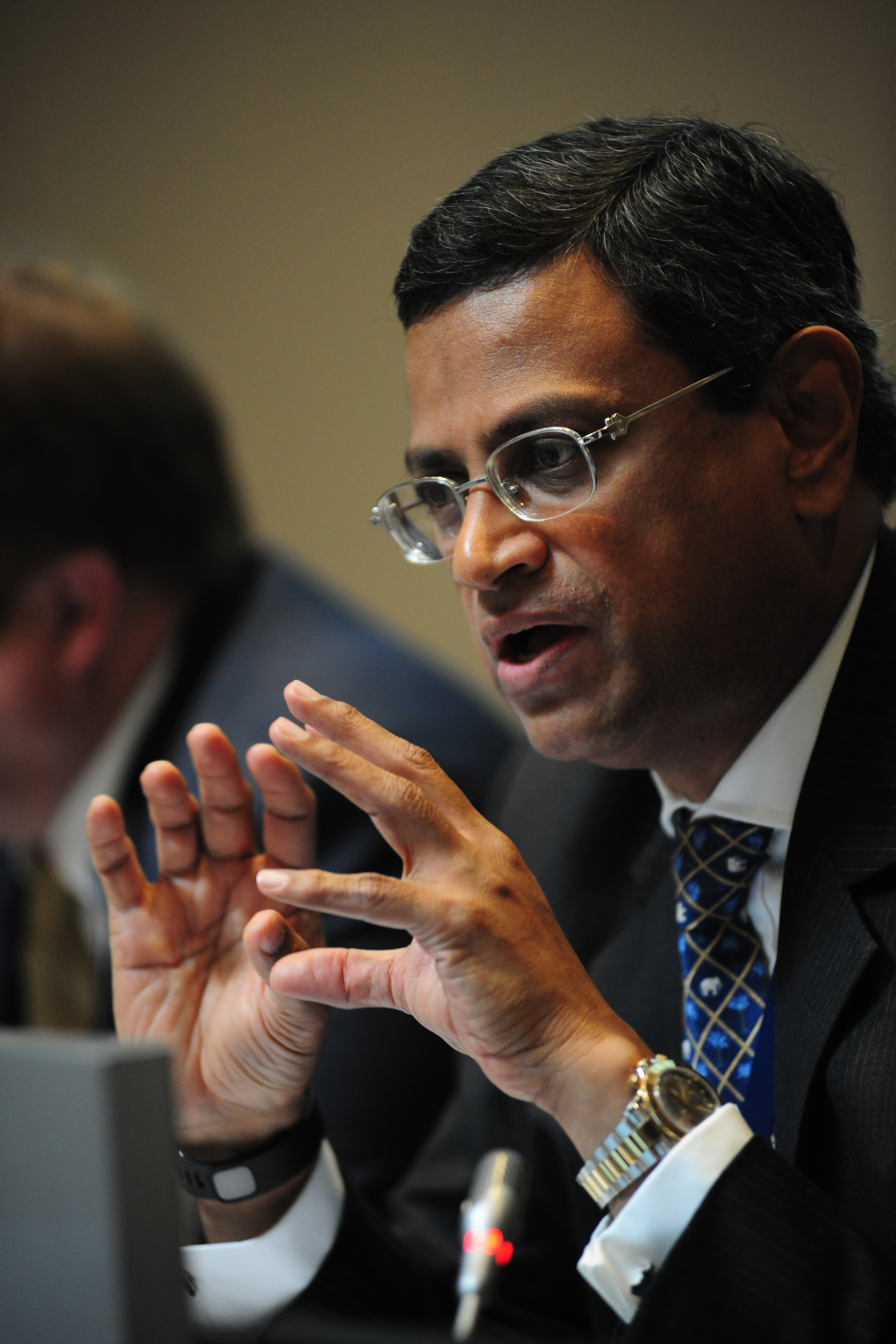
- Born: Doreswamy Nandkishore; 30 September 1958 (age 67); Kumbakonam, Tamil Nadu, India
- Other names: Nandu
- Education: MBA Marketing
- Alma mater: Indian Institute of Technology
- Occupations: business executive, venture capitalist and business school professor
- Known for: Former Global CEO of Nestlé Nutrition & Former Executive Vice President and Head of Asia Oceania, Africa of Nestlé S.A, Switzerland
- Spouse: Indu Mahajan
- Children: 2

Nandu Nandkishore (Doreswamy Nandkishore; born 30 September 1958) is an Indian business executive, venture capitalist and business school professor. He is the retired Global CEO of Nestlé Nutrition, and retired executive vice president and head of Asia Oceania, Africa of Nestlé S.A, Switzerland. He presently serves as an independent director on the board of several companies, and is a professor of practice at Indian School of Business and a guest lecturer at London Business School.

== Early life and education ==
Nandu was born in Kumbakonam city, in the southern Indian state of Tamil Nadu.

Nandu completed his schooling from St Xavier's Ranchi in 1971 and the Frank Anthony Public School New Delhi in 1974. In 1980, Nandkishore earned a Bachelor of Technology in Electrical and Electronics Engineering from the Indian Institute of Technology in Delhi, and a Master's in Management and Marketing Management from the Indian Institute of Management in Ahmedabad in 1982.

== Career ==
Nandu gained international experience in fast-moving consumer goods (FMCG) in both emerging and developed markets. Beginning his career in consumer goods in India, Nandu held a position in marketing at Pond's India Ltd in Chennai and was responsible for a few key brands. Thereafter, he moved to Delhi where he worked with Godrej Soaps.

=== Nestlé ===
Nandu joined Nestlé, India in 1989 as a brand manager. He was given the responsibility of Nestle's milks brands and was in charge of relaunching Nestlé Everyday Ghee. Nandu's career took an international turn in 1996 when he was transferred to Nestle's business in Indonesia to run the Confectionery Business Unit. In 1999, he moved to the Nestlé headquarters in Vevey, Switzerland to work as the Marketing Adviser, Chocolate, Confectionery & Biscuits SBU. In the 2000s, he returned to Indonesia taking the position of marketing and sales director at Nestlé Indonesia, and was subsequently appointed as CEO for Nestle Indonesia from March 2003.

In April, 2005, Nandkishore became the CEO of Nestlé Philippines. In 2010, he was appointed to the executive board of Nestlé, where he served as the first Global Head of Infant Nutrition. After having worked for a large span of his career in high-level positions in Indonesia, the Philippines, and India at Nestlé, Nandu took the role of the executive vice-president for Asia, Oceania, Africa and the Middle East and zone director for Asia, Oceania, Africa and Middle East (AOA). from October 1, 2011, at Nestlé SA, Switzerland. He succeeded Frits van Dijk to this position. At this time, Nandu was 52. Nandu, before he took this post, was the deputy executive vice-president and in charge of Nestlé Nutrition. Nandu was the first Indian to head a zone for Nestlé.

Nandu took an early retirement from Nestlé after working for 26 years at the company. He held the position of executive vice president, Head of Asia, Oceania, and Africa for Nestlé S.A. and zone director for Asia, Oceania, Africa and the Middle East (AOA) at the time of retirement. Wan Ling Martello, then CFO of Nestlé S.A., was appointed in the place of Nandkishore as executive vice president in charge of Zone AOA from March 2015. In this long career at Nestlé, Nandu spearheaded several international brands of Nestlé including confectionary brands like KitKat, Munch, Shark, as well as Nescafe (coffee), Nan, Lactogen, Cerelac and other brands.

=== Non-Executive positions ===
Nandu joined augmented reality firm, Blippar, as a non-executive board member in an advisory role at the company from August 2015 to April 2018. He also holds the position of an Independent Non-Executive Director, Delfi Ltd (18), and is on the advisory board of Borealis Foods

=== Investing ===
Nandu has invested in several early-stage start-ups. He invested in EdTech start-up, NxtWave, in its pre-Series A funding. He also provided seed capital for mother and baby care consumer company, The Moms Co., in March 2017 along with some other investors. (16) Nandkishore also holds a stake in Kraftshala. He has invested in Faircent in the Series A funding round. In 2021, Nandu was listed as one of the Top 70 Indian Angel Investors by Start-Up Lanes.

=== Teaching ===
Nandu is a professor of Practice, Marketing, and Strategy at the Indian School of Business. He also serves as a Guest Lecturer at the London Business School, where he was previously an Executive Fellow for Strategy and Entrepreneurship for three years. He has authored several academic papers along with Dominic Houlder.

== Personal life ==
Nandu married Indu Mahajan, wife in February 1984. They have two sons, Rahul (born in 1986) and Arjun (born in 1991).
