= Sanjay Puri =

Indian statistical physicist (born 1961)

- Born: 23 November 1961 (age 64); Rampur, Uttar Pradesh, India
- Education: IIT Delhi; University of Illinois
- Known for: Studies on statistical dynamics
- Awards: 1993 INSA Young Scientist Medal; 1994 IPA N. S. Satya Murthy Memorial Award; 1999 B. M. Birla Science Prize; 2006 Shanti Swarup Bhatnagar Prize; 2012 J. C. Bose National Fellow
- Scientific career
- Fields: Statistical physics
- Workplaces: Jawaharlal Nehru University; Johannes Gutenberg University of Mainz; University of Manchester; Cambridge University; Kyoto University
- Doctoral advisor: K. P.Jain; Yoshitsugu Oono

Sanjay Puri (born 23 November 1961) is an Indian statistical physicist and a senior professor at the School of Physical Sciences of Jawaharlal Nehru University. Known for his research on non-linear dynamics, Puri is an elected fellow of the Indian Academy of Sciences and the Indian National Science Academy. The Council of Scientific and Industrial Research, the apex agency of the Government of India for scientific research, awarded him the Shanti Swarup Bhatnagar Prize for Science and Technology, one of the highest Indian science awards, for his contributions to physical sciences in 2006. (Note: Long link - please select award year to see details)

== Biography ==
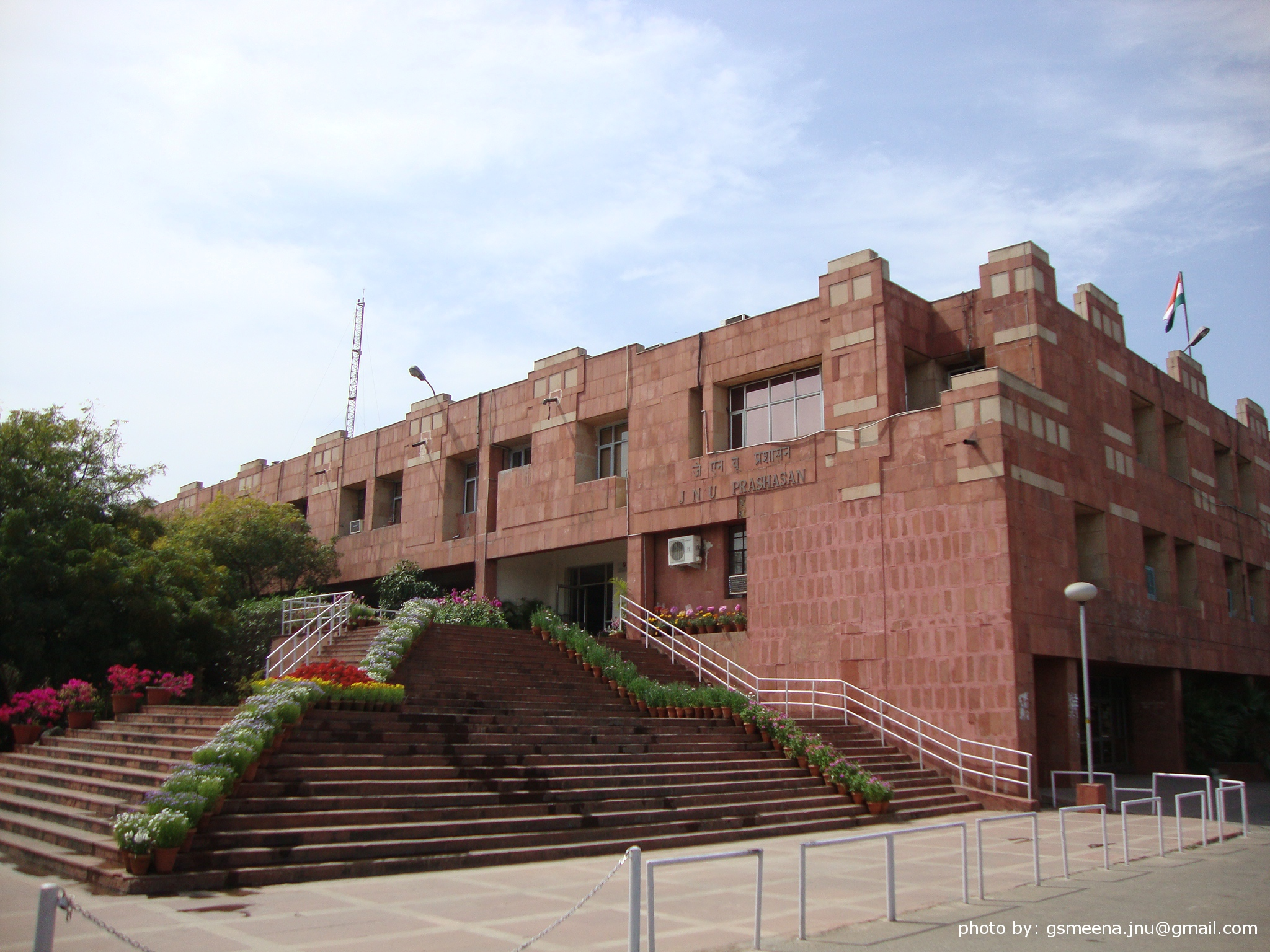
Jawaharlal Nehru University

Born on 23 November 1961 at Rampur in the Indian state of Uttar Pradesh, Sanjay Puri earned a research-based master's degree (MS), guided by K. P. Jain, for his thesis, Theoretical Investigations of Soliton Dynamics in 1982 from the Indian Institute of Technology, Delhi. Moving to the US, he secured another master's degree in physics from the University of Illinois at Urbana-Champaign in 1983 and continued there for his doctoral studies under guidance of Yoshitsugu Oono to secure a PhD in 1987, his thesis being Some Problems in the Dynamics of Spatially Extended Systems.. Returning to India, Puri joined Jawaharlal Nehru University the same year as an assistant professor at the School of Physical Sciences, became an associate professor in 1993 and has been working there as a professor since 2001. During this period, he also had several stints abroad as a visiting professor at institutions such as Johannes Gutenberg University of Mainz, University of Manchester, Cambridge University and Kyoto University.

== Legacy ==
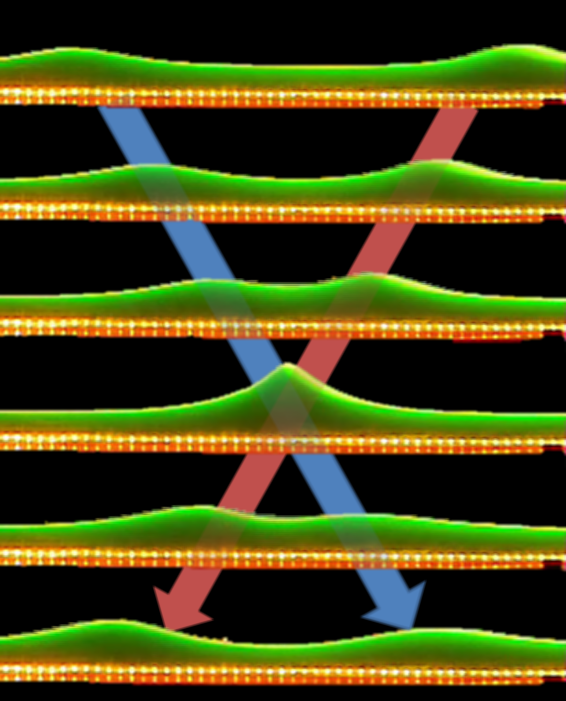
Collision of two solitons.

The core areas of Puri's work are in statistical physics and nonlinear dynamics with special focus on pattern formation in nonequilibrium systems. His research is reported to have studied the effects of confined geometries and the role of defects in phase separation dynamics and the work is known to have assisted in a wider understanding of kinetics of phase ordering. Study of granular materials, especially freely-evolving granular gases, was another focal point of his work. Puri's studies have been documented by way of a number of articles (Note: Please see Selected bibliography section) and the online article repository of the Indian Academy of Sciences has listed 134 of them. Besides, he has published three books, including Dissipative Phenomena in Condensed Matter: Some Applications, co-authored with Sushanta Kumar Dattagupta and Kinetics of Phase Transitions, an edited work. Puri has also guided several students in their studies and serves as the associate editor of Phase Transitions journal of Taylor and Francis.

== Awards and honors ==
Puri, who topped the IIT Delhi examinations in 1982, was a recipient of the Silver Medal of Excellence of the institute. The Indian National Science Academy awarded him the Young Scientist Medal in 1993 and the International Centre for Theoretical Physics selected him as an associate member in 1994. Puri received the N. S. Satya Murthy Memorial Award of the Indian Physics Association in 1994 followed by B. M. Birla Science Prize in 1999. He was chosen for the Homi Bhabha Fellowship in 2003 and for the J. C. Bose National Fellowship of the Department of Science and Technology in 2012. In between, the Council of Scientific and Industrial Research awarded him the Shanti Swarup Bhatnagar Prize, one of the highest Indian science awards in 2006. Puri is also an elected fellow of two of the three major Indian science academies, the Indian Academy of Sciences electing him in 2006 and the Indian National Science Academy fellowship reaching him in 2012.

== Selected bibliography ==
=== Books ===
- Sanjay Puri; Vinod Wadhawan (Editors) (24 March 2009). Kinetics of Phase Transitions. CRC Press. ISBN 978-1-4200-0836-4.
- Sushanta Dattagupta; Sanjay Puri (9 March 2013). Dissipative Phenomena in Condensed Matter: Some Applications. Springer Science & Business Media. ISBN 978-3-662-06758-1.

=== Articles ===
- Prasenjit Das, Sanjay Puri, Moshe Schwartz (2016). "Clustering and velocity distributions in granular gases cooling by solid friction". Physical Review E. 94 (3) 032907. arXiv:1609.01114. Bibcode:2016PhRvE..94c2907D. doi:10.1103/PhysRevE.94.032907. PMID 27739850. S2CID 43652778.
- Prabhat K. Jaiswal, Sanjay Puri, Subir K. Das (2010). "Kinetics of surface enrichment: a molecular dynamics study". Journal of Chemical Physics. 133 (15): 154901. arXiv:1011.6290. Bibcode:2010JChPh.133o4901J. doi:10.1063/1.3491833. PMID 20969420. S2CID 13973501.
- Awaneesh Singh, Sanjay Puri, Hiranmaya Mishra (2011). "Domain growth in chiral phase transitions". Nuclear Physics A. 864 (1): 176–202. arXiv:1101.0500. Bibcode:2011NuPhA.864..176S. doi:10.1016/j.nuclphysa.2011.06.023. S2CID 67763594.
- Awaneesh Singh, Sanjay Puri, Chandan Dasgupta (2012). "Growth kinetics of nanoclusters in solution". The Journal of Physical Chemistry B. 116 (15): 4519–4523. doi:10.1021/jp211380j. PMID 22424100.
- Awadhesh Kumar Dubey, Anna Bodrova, Sanjay Puri, Nikolai Brilliantov (2013). "Velocity distribution function and effective restitution coefficient for a granular gas of viscoelastic particles". Physical Review E. 87 (6) 062202. arXiv:1209.5326. Bibcode:2013PhRvE..87f2202D. doi:10.1103/PhysRevE.87.062202. PMID 23848666. S2CID 44474830.

== See also ==
- Kinetics of Phase Separation
- Kinetic theory
- Non-equilibrium thermodynamics
