= Anurag Mathur =

Indian author and journalist

Anurag Mathur (अनुराग माथुर) is an Indian author and journalist mainly known for his 1991 novel The Inscrutable Americans. He was educated at the Scindia School (Gwalior, India). He earned his bachelor's degree from St. Stephen's College, Delhi, and his master's from the University of Tulsa.

== Bibliography ==
- The Inscrutable Americans
- Making the Minister Smile
- Are All Women Leg-Spinners asked the Stephanian, later republished as The Department of Denials
- Scenes From an Executive Life
- 22 Days in India
- A Life Lived Later - Poems
- Popat Lal Bhindi
- The country is going to the dogs (2014)
