= Rajendra Singh Pawar =

Indian entrepreneur (19 March 1951)

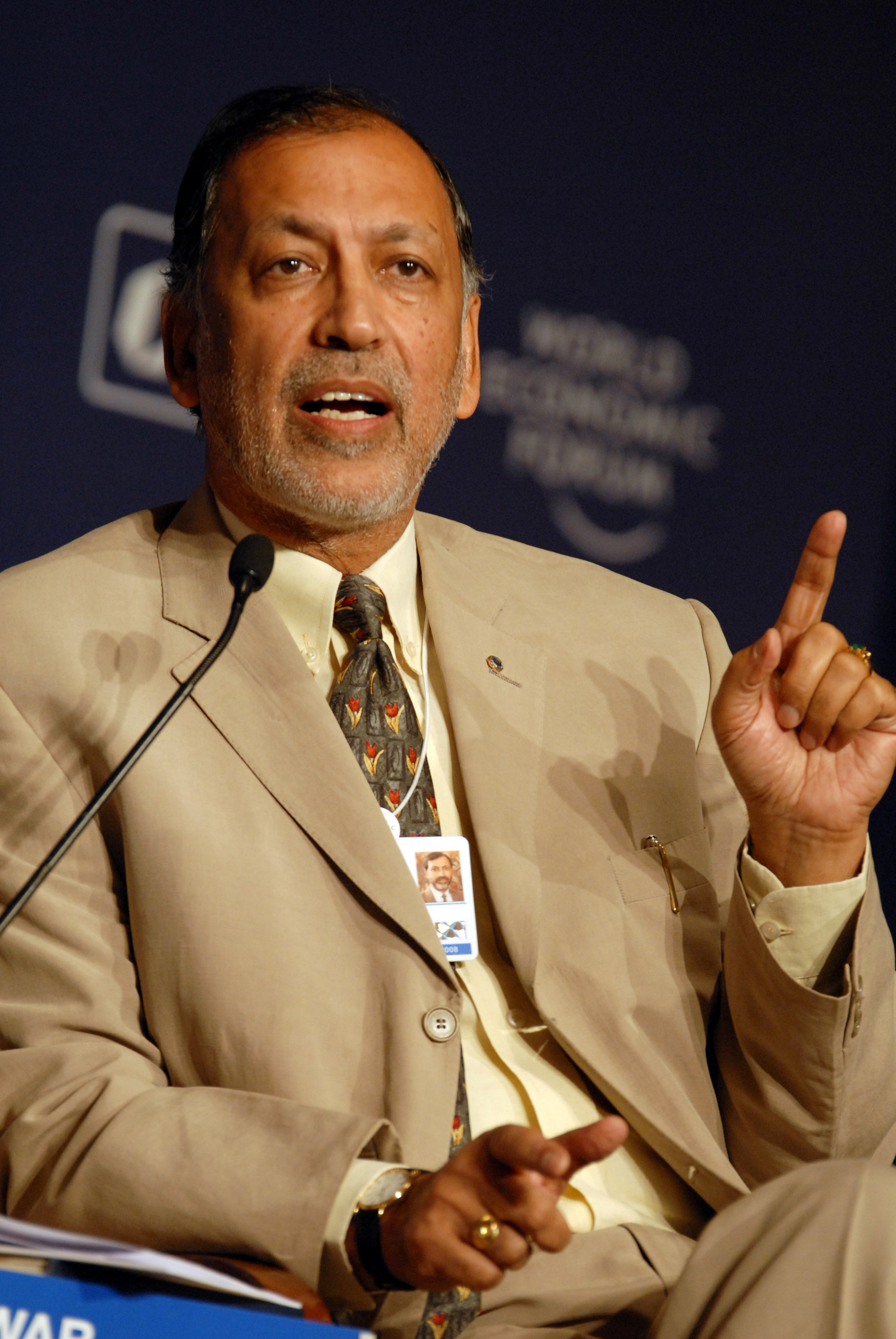
- Pawar at the World Economic Forum's India Economic Summit 2008
- Born: 19 March 1951 (age 75); Jammu, Jammu and Kashmir, India
- Education: IIT Delhi
- Occupations: Chairman and Co-Founder NIIT Limited; Founder NIIT University; Board Member Scindia School; Member of Governing Board Indian School of Business; Vice Chairman of NCAER (National Council of Applied Economic Research) Governing Body.; Chairman of the Board of Directors of Data Security Council of India
- Partner: Neeti Pawar
- Children: Udai, Urvashi, Unnati
- Awards: Padma Bhushan (2011); Lifetime Achievement Award 2022’ by apex industry body FICCI (Federation of Indian Chambers of Commerce & Industry

Rajendra Singh Pawar (Padma Bhushan awardee) is an Indian entrepreneur, chairman and co-founder of NIIT Limited, established in 1981. He also founded NIIT University, a not-for-profit university in Neemrana, Rajasthan, in 2009.

== Early life and education ==
Pawar was born in Jammu on 19 March 1951. He studied at The Scindia School, Gwalior. He graduated with a B.Tech. in electrical engineering from the Indian Institute of Technology, Delhi, in 1972. Pawar has received the ‘Madhav Award’ from The Scindia School in 1999 and the Distinguished Alumnus Award at IIT in 1995. In 2005, he was awarded an honorary doctoral degree by the Rajiv Gandhi Technical University.

== Career ==
Pawar began his professional career with Larsen & Toubro Limited as a graduate engineer trainee in June 1972.

He then moved on to DCM, where he served for 4 years, followed by 5 years in Hindustan Computers Limited, before establishing NIIT in 1981.

Pawar also founded NIIT Technologies, an IT firm, in 1992. Assessed at SEI-CMMi Level 5, NIIT Technologies offers software services to organizations in the travel, transportation, manufacturing/distribution, financial services, healthcare, and government sectors. He has also established the not-for-profit NIIT University in Neemrana, Rajasthan, in 2009.

=== Nation development ===
Pawar has been a part of Prime Minister Vajpayee's National Taskforce (1998), and was a member of Prime Minister Manmohan Singh's National Council on Skill Development (2009-2014). He chaired the NASSCOM Cyber Security Task Force.

=== Global advisor ===
Pawar has been a former member of the International Business Council of the World Economic Forum and PIAC (Presidential International Advisory Council) of the Government of South Africa, and has also served as an advisor to the Hunan province of China.

=== Industry associations ===
Pawar served as chairman of NASSCOM (National Association of Software & Service Companies) from 2011 to 2012. As president of MAIT (Manufacturers Association for Information Technology) from 1990 to 1992, he integrated MAIT activities into those of other leading industry associations in India. MAIT played a significant role in shaping the Government of India's IT policies during his tenure.

He is currently vice chairman of the NCAER (National Council of Applied Economic Research) governing body. He is a fellow of the Computer Society of India and the Institution of Electronics & Telecom Engineers and is chairman of the board of directors of the Data Security Council of India.

=== Academic boards ===
Pawar is on the board of governors of the Indian School of Business, Hyderabad, and The Scindia School. He has also held positions on the boards of IIT Delhi, IIM Bangalore, IIM Udaipur, and Delhi University's University Court.

== Social impact ==
Pawar launched the Hole-in-the-Wall education (HiWEL) initiative in 1999 with Dr Sugata Mitra, chief scientist emeritus, NIIT, with the aim of making education accessible to the remotest corners in the country. The project earned the coveted ‘Digital Opportunity Award’ by World Information Technology Services Alliance (WITSA) in 2008.

He has also led NIIT to participate in the ambitious human capacity building project for Bhutan, which was designed to help the country transition into a modern knowledge society. The Indian Government assisted project was launched on April 30, 2010, by the Prime Ministers of India and Bhutan, on the sidelines of the SAARC summit in Bhutan. The project aimed to provide ICT skills to over a quarter of the population of Bhutan, to help them become confident and empowered citizens of a connected and ICT-enabled world.

Pawar promoted the establishment of NIIT Foundation (NF), a not-for-profit education society in 2004, with the vision to support the underprivileged sections of the country through educational initiatives and skill development programs.

== Awards and honours ==
Pawar received the Padma Bhushan in 2011. He was also named 'IT Man of the Year' by the IT industry journal, Dataquest, in 1998.

Pawar received the ‘Lifetime Achievement Award 2022’ from the Federation of Indian Chambers of Commerce & Industry. In recognition of his entrepreneurial innovation in education, he received the 'Lifetime Achievement Award' at the Dataquest ICT Awards in August 2020. He was honored as the ‘IT Gem of India’ at INFOCOM 2013, India's largest IT & Telecom convention, by the ABP Group. Global Business Intelligence firm, Ernst & Young, conferred on Pawar its ‘Master Entrepreneur of the Year Award’ in 1999. Pawar has been awarded ‘The Global India Splendor Award’ on the occasion of the 60th year of India's independence, for his work on developing human resource potential. He was also honored with the Nayudamma Award in 2012.

== Personal life ==
Pawar's wife, Neeti Pawar, is an active promoter of Indian art and handicrafts. They have three children - son Udai, an IIT physicist turned filmmaker, and two daughters, Urvashi, a psychoanalytic psychotherapist, and Unnati, an art historian.
