= PartyGaming =

Public limited company

PartyGaming plc was a network of gambling sites operated by Ruth Parasol in the Caribbean. Founded in 1997, the network eventually operated under an umbrella company called iGlobalMedia, which then changed its name to PartyGaming. PartyGaming's flagship site, PartyPoker.com, was launched in 2001. Its primary shareholders were Parasol, Group Operations Director Anurag Dikshit, Marketing Director Vikrant Bhargava (who joined the company in 1998 and 1999, respectively), and Russ DeLeon.

The company merged with bwin Interactive Entertainment in March 2011 to form Bwin.Party Digital Entertainment.

== History ==
In the 1990s, Las Vegas consultant and actuary Michael Shackleford ran a computer trial of the first blackjack and roulette games offered by the company. Shackleford stated that the "results clearly showed they (the games) weren't fair". Ruth Parasol's spokesman Jon Mendelsohn acknowledged that the chances had "tipped too much toward the house", but attributed the problems to "software flaws", not rigging. It led to the development of their own proprietary software rather than using external platforms.

=== The IPO ===
The foursome sold over 23% of their combined shares to take the company public on the London Stock Exchange in June 2005. The initial offer price of 116p valued the company at £4.64 billion ($8.46 billion). Within a month a rising share price rose saw the value of the company exceed $12 billion. In early September 2005, a cautious statement about future growth prospects saw the shares fall by a third in a day, but the same week the company was promoted to the FTSE 100 Index. By the end of November 2005 the stock had regained its original IPO value. During the IPO, no new shares of PartyGaming were issued, so all of the net proceeds went to the four original shareholders selling shares and nothing to the company itself.

=== Post IPO ===
Dikshit and Bhargava stepped down from the company's board in May 2006. Dikshit announced that he would remain with the company as the chief operating officer; Bhargava would continue as an advisor and shareholder of the company while pursuing other business interests.

In February 2006, PartyGaming introduced a new integrated platform, enabling multiple games to be played without requiring customers to log in each time and deposit funds in separate accounts. An online backgammon site, PartyGammon.com, was launched in mid-2006. In August 2006 PartyGaming acquired Antigua and Barbuda–registered sports betting operator Gamebookers which focuses on the European market.

In its early days, PartyGaming entered into several marketing partnerships that allowed companies such as Empire Online, which ran Empire Poker, to share in a common pool of poker players. Players could access the PartyGaming network either through the PartyPoker.com software itself or through the software of one of PartyGaming's "skin" partners.

In mid-2005, PartyGaming made various moves to ringfence its own players from those of the "skin" partners. The company began to explore mergers, buyouts, and other options. In October of that year, PartyGaming launched an upgraded PartyPoker.com software system that cut off the "skin" partners from the main pool of players, and left the "skin" players on the old system.

In November 2005, offer discussions with Empire Online were terminated, and in December Empire Online confirmed that it had started legal proceedings against PartyGaming in the High Court of Gibraltar. In February 2006 the two companies announced a US$250 million settlement deal; PartyGaming agreed to acquire Empire's "skin" operations, and Empire dropped the suit. In December 2006, PartyGaming announced the acquisition of the remaining assets of Empire Online.

PartyGaming also acquired the operations of former "skin" partners IntertopsPoker and MultiPoker, in separate private transactions for undisclosed amounts.

=== U.S. legislation ===
On 29 September 2006, the U.S. Congress passed the Unlawful Internet Gambling Enforcement Act of 2006.

On 2 October 2006, PartyGaming announced that it would "suspend all real money gaming business with US customers" in light of the passage of the Unlawful Internet Gambling Enforcement Act of 2006. George W. Bush signed the act into law on 13 October, and PartyGaming suspended offerings of real-money games to U.S. players. Free play games and non-US customers were not affected.

In the wake of this news, PartyGaming's publicly traded stock dropped almost 60% in 24 hours. The company was moved from the FTSE 100 to the FTSE 250 Index on 11 October.

In April 2009, the company made a settlement with the United States government where they agreed to pay a penalty of $105 million over the next four years as part of a "non-prosecution agreement". As part of the deal, PartyGaming put its name to a "statement of facts" in which it admitted for the first time that, before October 2006, it had targeted US citizens, resulting in the processing of transactions that were "contrary to certain US laws".

=== French legislation ===
In June 2010, PartyGaming obtained its first agreement on the recently regulated French market. This agreement is given for the online betting activities of the websites partybets.fr and gamebookers.fr. At the same time, PartyGaming obtained the online poker French licence for partypoker.fr, acfpoker.fr and luckyjeux.fr.
