= NIIT =

Indian corporation

NIIT Limited
- Type: Public
- Traded as: BSE: 500304; NSE: NIITLTD
- Industry: Higher education
- Founded: 1981; 45 years ago
- Founder: Rajendra S. Pawar; Vijay K. Thadani
- Headquarters: Gurugram, India
- Key people: Rajendra Singh Pawar (Chairman); Vijay Kumar Thadani (Vice Chairman and MD); Pankaj Jathar (CEO)
- Services: Training and development Vocational education
- Revenue: ▲₹368 crore (US$39 million) (2024)
- Operating income: ▲₹47 crore (US$5.0 million) (2024)
- Net income: ▲₹39 crore (US$4.2 million) (2024)
- Total assets: ▲₹1,163 crore (US$120 million) (2024)
- Total equity: ▲₹1,006 crore (US$110 million) (2024)
- Number of employees: 907 (2024)
- Website: niit.com

NIIT 40 Years Logo

NIIT Limited is an Indian for-profit multinational corporation headquartered in Gurgaon, India, that provides training, development, and vocational education. The company was set up in 1981 to help the nascent IT industry overcome its human resource challenges. NIIT offers training and development to individuals, enterprises and institutions.

== History ==
NIIT was established in 1981 by Rajendra S. Pawar and Vijay K. Thadani, graduates from IIT Delhi, with one million rupees. NIIT conceived a franchising model in IT education for the very first time, setting up nine centers by 1987.

The company earned the epithet, the 'McDonald's of the software business' by Far Eastern Economic Review in September, 2001.

In 2014, NIIT tied up with National Skill Development Corporation to launch NIIT Yuva Jyoti centers, under the pilot phase of Prime Minister Narendra Modi's Skill India campaign and the Pradhan Mantri Kaushal Vikas Yojana (PMKVY) in North East, J&K and Jharkhand.

In May 2019, Baring Private Equity Asia had acquired controlling stake of NIIT Ltd in NIIT Technologies Ltd.

In August 2020, NIIT Technologies Ltd. rebranded itself and began operating under the name Coforge Limited.

=== Acquisitions ===
In 2001, NIIT acquired Osprey Systems, DEI and Click2learn in the US, to establish its e-learning and corporate learning practices in that country.

In 2006, NIIT acquired Element K, a provider of learning solutions in North America. Subsequently, Element K was sold off in 2012.

On October 1, 2021 NIIT announced the acquisition of a 70% stake acquisition in RPS Consulting, a Bengaluru based training company.

=== Financial controversy ===
On June 9, 2022, the Securities and Exchange Board of India concluded an investigation regarding insider trading within NIIT Technologies. The investigation verified that insider trading had occurred, as a result of a corporate announcement made on behalf of NIIT on the floor of the National Stock Exchange of India on March 23, 2015.

== Timeline ==
- 1981: NIIT was established by Rajendra S. Pawar and Vijay K. Thadani to optimize on the opportunity of booming IT education and training in India.
- 1982: Setup educational centres in Mumbai and Chennai; Introduced Multimedia technology in education.
- 1983: Corporate training program introduced.
- 1984: IT consultancy service started.
- 1985: Head Office integrated at New Delhi.
- 1986: Software product distribution started under "Insoft" brand.
- 1987: Conceived Franchising Model of education.
- 1990: Created the Computer drome to provide unlimited computer time to students.
- 1991: First overseas office set up in US; "Bhavishya Jyoti Scholarships" launched for meritorious and socially challenged students.
- 1992: GNIIT program started with professional practice.
- 1993: Received ISO 9001 for software export; Listed on BSE.
- 1995: NIIT tied up with Microsoft to provide education of Microsoft technologies.
- 1996: First overseas education center launched; Launched "NetVarsity", the virtual University; Awarded ISO 9001 for Computer Education.
- 1997: NIIT was the first Indian Company to be assessed at SEI CMM Level 5 for Software Business; Unique distinction puts NIIT into first list of 21st Global companies.
- 1999: Achieved the status of Microsoft's best training partner in Asia; Five time World Champion Viswanathan Anand became NIIT Brand Ambassador; Started Hole-in-the-Wall (HiWEl) experiment for disadvantaged children.
- 2000: Tied up with Oracle Corporation to provide education on Oracle technologies specially on Oracle Database; Collaborated with Sun Microsystems on "iForce initiatives on computing giant".
- 2001: Microsoft awarded NIIT the "Best Training Company Award".
- 2003: Launched NIIT MindChampions Academy with Viswanathan Anand to promote chess in schools.
- 2004: Global Solutions Business spun off into NIIT Technologies; Industry endorsed GNIIT curriculum was launches; NIIT and Intel signed a deal to use technology-assisted learning in school.
- 2005: Launch of NIIT IT Aptitude Test (NITAT).
- 2006: Launched new businesses called NIIT Litmus which provides testing & assessment services for IT&ITES organizations, NIIT Imperia which would provide three certificate programs from Indian Institutes of Management and IFBI - Institute of Finance Banking and Insurance (NIIT IFBI).
- 2009: Founded and commenced new "NIIT University" campus in Neemrana, Rajasthan offering more post graduation level courses.
- 2011: Launch of NIIT Yuva Jyoti Limited (NYJL)- a joint venture between NIIT and NSDC to fuel growth in Skills & Employability for youth across India.
- 2012: Launch of Digital Marketing Program; NIIT received 'Top IT Training Company Award 2012' for the 20th year in succession by Cybermedia publications.
- 2013: NIIT, NIIT University entered into a MoU with Autodesk to evangelize design as a learning discipline in India; NIIT launched 'Program in Business Analytics'; NIIT launches NIIT Cloud Campus: A pioneering initiative undertaken to help take high quality educational programs to the remotest corners of the country; NIIT enters Test Preparation Market with CTET Coaching.
- 2014: NIIT launches its new persona based website www.niit.com.
- 2015: Internet and Mobile Association of India (IAMAI) recognizes NIIT as the "Best Educational Website"; NIIT enters into MoU with Guian New Area, China.
- 2016: Launch of Training.com to offer online training.
- 2017: Sapnesh Lalla takes charge as the CEO of NIIT Ltd.
- In May 2019, Baring Private Equity Asia had acquired controlling stake of NIIT Ltd in NIIT Technologies Ltd.
- 2023: The group completed the demerger of its business, with corporate learning transferred to NIIT Learning System's, and skills & careers business retained with the parent company.

== See also ==
- Professional certification (computer technology)
- Aptech
- FutureLearn
- Pluralsight
- EdX
- Coursera
- Udemy
- Udacity
- LinkedIn Learning
