= Karan Singh =

Indian politician (born 1931)

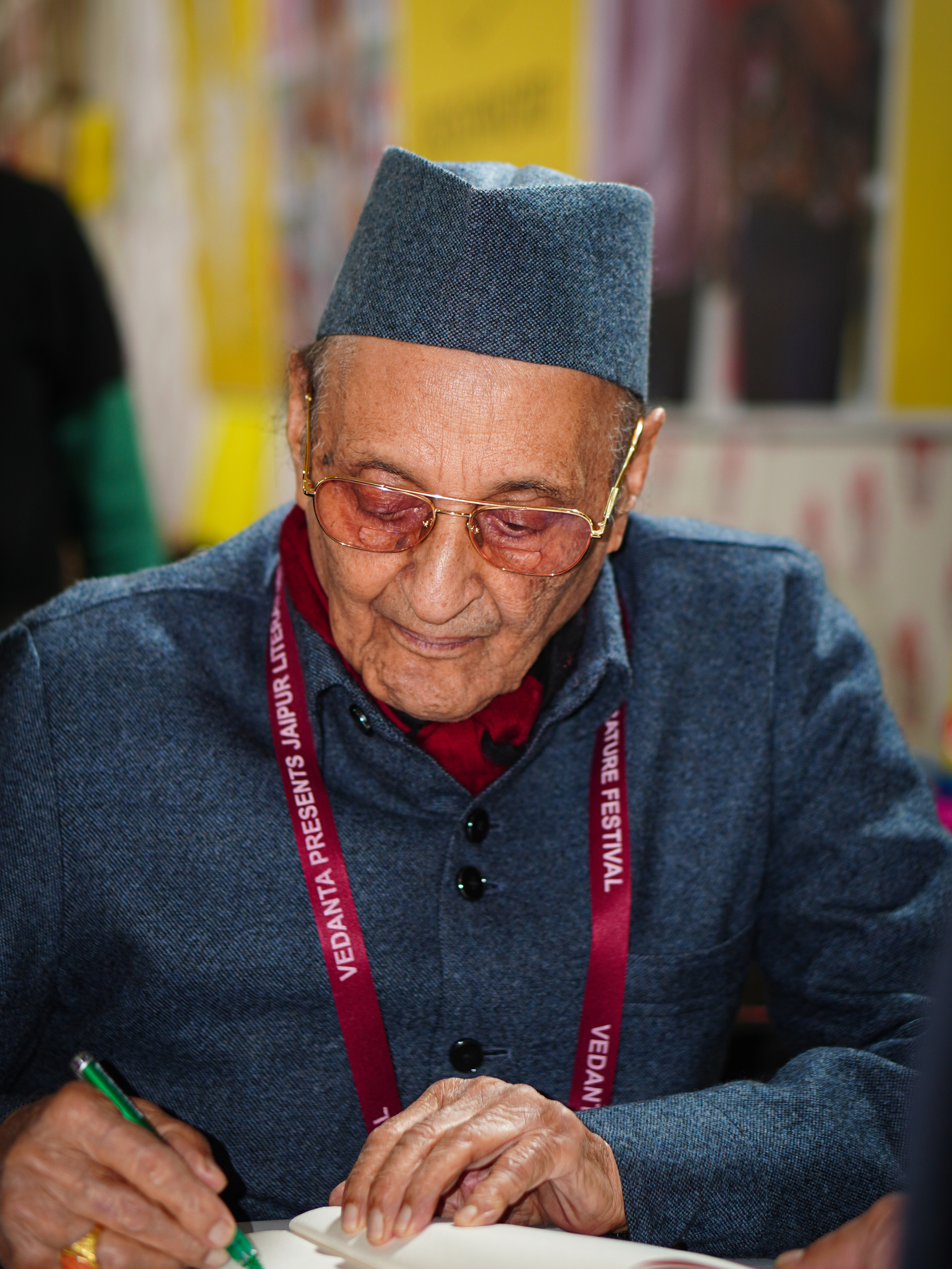
- Singh in 2026

1st Governor of Jammu and Kashmir
- In office 30 March 1965 – 15 May 1967
- Preceded by: Position established Himself as Sadr-i-Riyasat
- Succeeded by: Bhagwan Sahay

Sadr-i-Riyasat of Jammu and Kashmir
- In office 17 November 1952 – 30 March 1965
- Prime Minister: Sheikh Abdullah; Bakshi Ghulam Mohammad; Khwaja Shamsuddin; Ghulam Mohammed Sadiq
- Preceded by: Position established
- Succeeded by: Position abolished Himself as Governor

Prince Regent of Jammu and Kashmir
- In office 20 June 1949 – 17 November 1952
- Monarch: Sir Hari Singh

Ambassador of India to the United States of America
- In office 1989–1990
- Preceded by: P. K. Kaul
- Succeeded by: Abid Hussain

Union Minister of Education and Culture
- In office 30 July 1979 – 14 January 1980
- Prime Minister: Charan Singh
- Preceded by: Pratap Chandra Chunder
- Succeeded by: B. Shankaranand

Union Minister for Health and Family Planning
- In office 9 November 1973 – 24 March 1977
- Prime Minister: Indira Gandhi
- Preceded by: Uma Shankar Dikshit
- Succeeded by: Raj Narain

Union Minister of Tourism and Civil Aviation
- In office 13 March 1967 – 9 November 1973
- Prime Minister: Indira Gandhi
- Preceded by: Ministry established
- Succeeded by: R. Bahadur

Member of Parliament, Rajya Sabha
- In office 28 January 2000 – 27 January 2018
- Succeeded by: Sanjay Singh
- Constituency: National Capital Territory of Delhi

Member of Parliament, Lok Sabha
- In office 1971–1984
- Preceded by: G. S. Brigadier
- Succeeded by: Girdhari Lal Dogra
- Constituency: Udhampur
- In office 1967–1968
- Preceded by: Constituency established
- Succeeded by: G. S. Brigadier

Titular Maharaja Of Jammu and Kashmir
- In office 1952-1971
- Crown Prince: Vikramaditya Singh (1964 to 1971)
- Preceded by: Maharaja Sir Hari Singh
- Succeeded by: Position Abolished

Titular Maharaja Of Jammu and Kashmir Royal family
- In office 1971
- Crown Prince: Vikramaditya Singh (1971 to Present)
- Preceded by: Maharaja Sir Hari Singh

Personal details
- Born: 9 March 1931 (age 95) Cannes, France
- Party: Indian National Congress (1947–1979; 1999–present)
- Other political affiliations: Jammu & Kashmir National Conference (1996–1999); Independent (1984–1996); Indian National Congress (U) (1979–1984)
- Spouse: Yasho Rajya Lakshmi (m. 1949; died 2009)
- Relations: Dogra dynasty Chitrangada Singh (daughter-in-law); Bhim Singh (kinsman); Dhian Singh (ancestral Kinsman)
- Children: Vikramaditya Singh, Ajatshatru Singh, Jyotsna Singh
- Parent(s): Maharaja Sir Hari Singh; Maharani Tara Devi
- Education: University of Kashmir (B.A.); University of Delhi (M.A., PhD)
- Awards: Padma Vibhushan

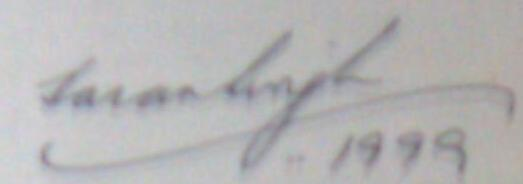
- Signature
- Website: karansingh.com

Karan Singh (born 9 March 1931) is an Indian politician and philosopher. He is the titular Maharaja of the princely state of Jammu and Kashmir. From 1952 to 1965 he was the Sadr-i-Riyasat (President) of the state of Jammu and Kashmir. He is the chairperson trustee of the Dharmarth Trust of Jammu and Kashmir which maintains 175 temples in north India and works in other areas such as historical preservation.

Singh was a member of India's Upper House of Parliament, the Rajya Sabha, representing the national capital territory of Delhi. He is a senior member of the Indian National Congress party who served successively as President (Sadr-i-Riyasat) and Governor of the Indian-administered Jammu and Kashmir. He was a life trustee and president of India International Centre. He was elected chancellor of Banaras Hindu University for three terms until 2018 when he was succeeded by Giridhar Malaviya. He has been a prospective presidential candidate over the years.

== Early and personal life ==
Karan Singh was born at the Martinez Hotel, Cannes, France, into the Dogra dynasty. He was the only son of Sir Hari Singh, Maharaja of Jammu and Kashmir. His mother, Maharani Tara Devi, who was the fourth wife of his father, was the daughter of a landowning Katoch Rajput family and came from (Vijaypur near Jaisinghpur) in Kangra district of Himachal Pradesh.

Singh was educated at Doon School, Dehradun, a boarding school, which represented a departure from the usual practise of princes being educated by tutors at home. The school was very elite, but it nevertheless meant that Karan Singh shared the classroom (though not the hostel) with boys from non-royal backgrounds, and received a standard education. Unusually for the scion of an Indian royal family, he then enrolled in a college for a graduate degree, receiving first a B.A. degree from Jammu and Kashmir University, Srinagar, and subsequently an M.A. degree in Political Science and a PhD from University of Delhi.

On 4 March 1949, the 18-year-old Yuvraj Karan Singh was married to 12-year-old Yasho Rajya Lakshmi (7 January 1937 – 24 May 2009), the granddaughter of Mohan Shumsher Rana, Maharajah of Nepal, belonging to the Rana dynasty of Nepal. Her father, General Maharajkumar Sharada Shumsher Jung Bahadur Rana, was a son of Mohan Shumsher. The match, arranged by their families in the usual Indian way, lasted all their lives until her death in 2009, aged 72. The couple had three children:

- Yuvraj Vikramaditya Singh, elder son and crown prince; married Chitrangada Scindia, the daughter of Madhavrao Scindia of Gwalior, in 1987.
- Ajatshatru Singh, second son; took to politics, was elected to the state assembly from the Nagrota constituency and became a minister in the state government. His wife is the daughter of an army officer.
- Jyotsna Singh, only daughter, married to Dhirendra Singh Chauhan, belonging to Mainpuri in Uttar Pradesh.

In the early 1960s, he took initiation from Sri Madhava Ashish, a disciple of Sri Krishna Prem of the Mirtola ashram.

== Political career ==
In 1949, at age of eighteen, Singh was appointed as the Prince Regent of Jammu and Kashmir state after his father stepped down as the ruler, following the state's accession to India. From that point, he served successively as regent, the Sadr-i-Riyasat, and the first governor of the state of Jammu and Kashmir from 1965 to 1967.

On 8 August 1953 as the President (Sadr-i-Riyasat) of Jammu and Kashmir, Karan Singh backed a coup d'etat against the elected Prime Minister Sheikh Abdullah, allegedly for harboring independent ambitions for Kashmir, which led to the imprisonment of Abdullah for eleven years following the Kashmir Conspiracy Case.

In 1967, he resigned as Governor of Jammu and Kashmir, and became the youngest-ever member of the Union Cabinet, holding the portfolios of Tourism and Civil Aviation between 1967 and 1973. Two years later, he voluntarily surrendered his privy purse, which he had been entitled to since the death of his father in 1961. He placed the entire sum into a charitable trust named after his parents.

In the 26th amendment to the Constitution of India promulgated in 1971, the Government of India, of which Karan Singh was a Union cabinet minister, abolished all official symbols of princely India, including titles, privileges, and remuneration (privy purses). During the conclusion of the Cold War, he was India's ambassador to the USA. Singh received the Padma Vibhushan in 2005.

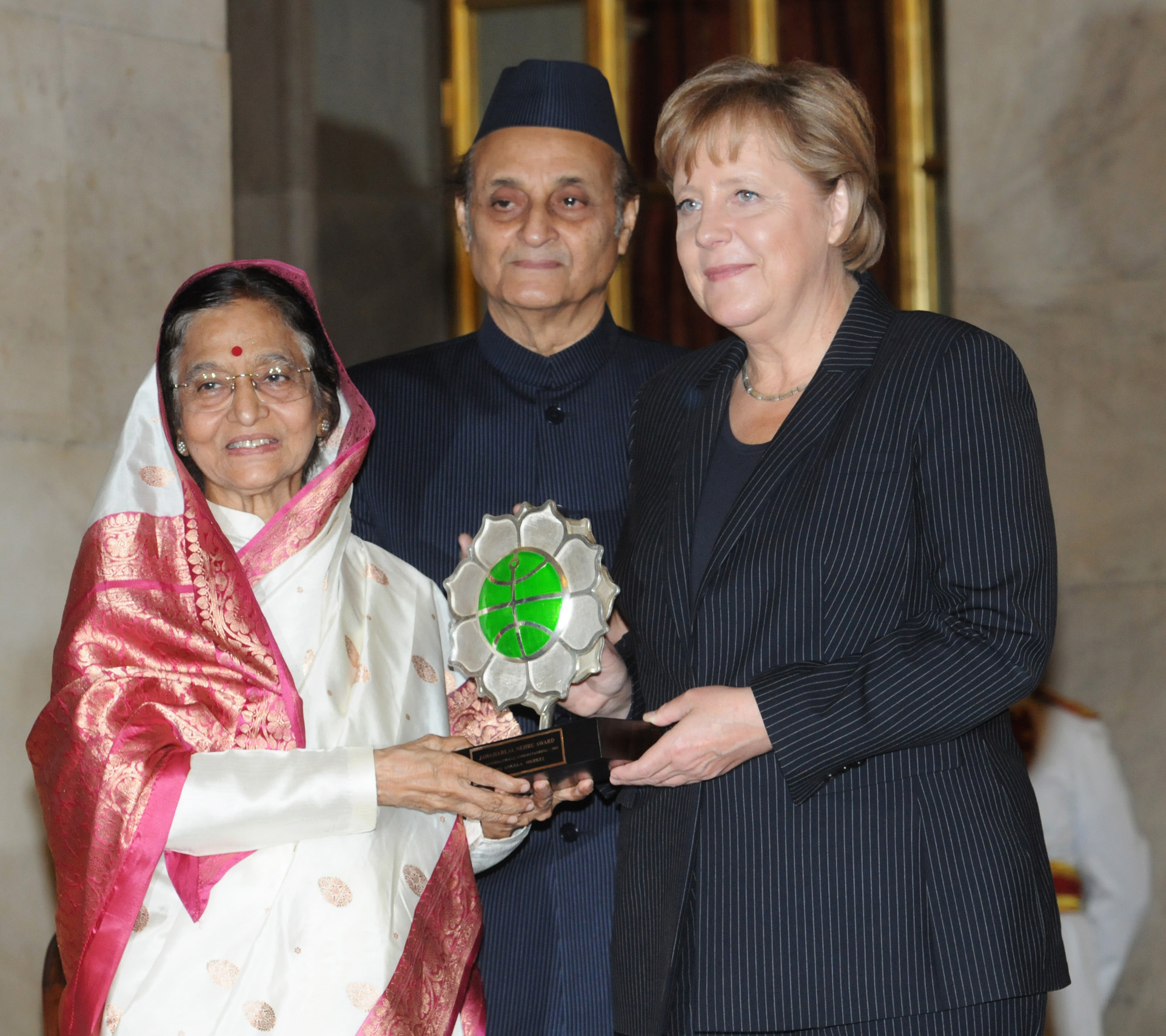
Karan Singh and President of India Pratibha Patil present the Jawaharlal Nehru Award for International Understanding to German Chancellor Angela Merkel at the Presidential Palace in New Delhi, India in 2009.

In 1971, he was sent as an envoy to the Eastern Bloc nations to explain India's position with regard to East Pakistan, then engaged in civil war with West Pakistan. He attempted to resign following an aircraft crash in 1973, but the resignation was not accepted. The same year, he became the Minister for Health and Family planning, serving in this post until 1977.

Following the Emergency, Karan Singh was elected to the Lok Sabha from Udhampur in 1977 on a Congress ticket [the party had not split into Congress(I) and Congress(U) factions till then], and became Minister of Education and Culture in 1979 in Charan Singh's cabinet, representing Congress(U), which had split from Indira's Congress. Notably, Charan Singh became Prime Minister after the fall of Janata Party government headed by Morarji Desai. And Charan Singh himself resigned without facing Parliament even for a day as he was not sure of having a confidence motion passed in his favour. Karan Singh contested the 1980 Lok Sabha election on a Congress(U) ticket and won. In 1989–1990, he served as Indian Ambassador to the US, and this experience became the subject of a book he wrote, "Brief Sojourn".

From 1967 to 1984, Karan Singh was a member of the Lok Sabha. In 1984, he contested the Lok Sabha polls as an independent candidate from Jammu but lost the election. He was a member of the Rajya Sabha from 30 November 1996 to 12 August 1999, representing National Conference, a Muslim dominated party active in Jammu and Kashmir. Later, he was a Rajya Sabha member from 28 January 2000 to 27 January 2018 representing INC. He is known for switching his loyalties from one political party to another quite frequently. He has served as Chancellor of Banaras Hindu University, Jammu and Kashmir University, Jawaharlal Nehru University, and NIIT University.

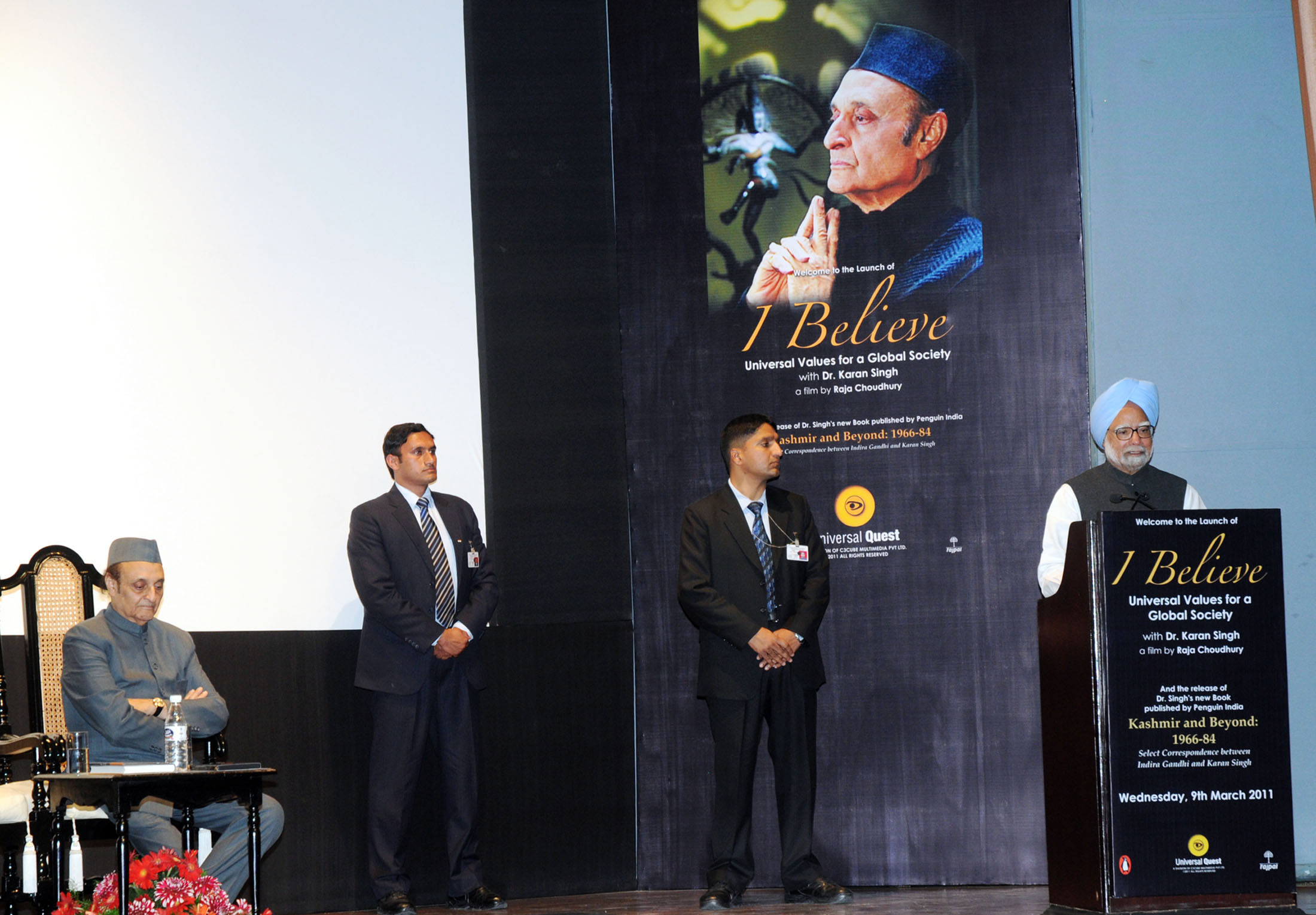
Prime Minister Manmohan Singh addressing at the launch of a film - I Believe Universal Values for a Global Society, by Raja Choudhury based on the beliefs of Singh in 2011.

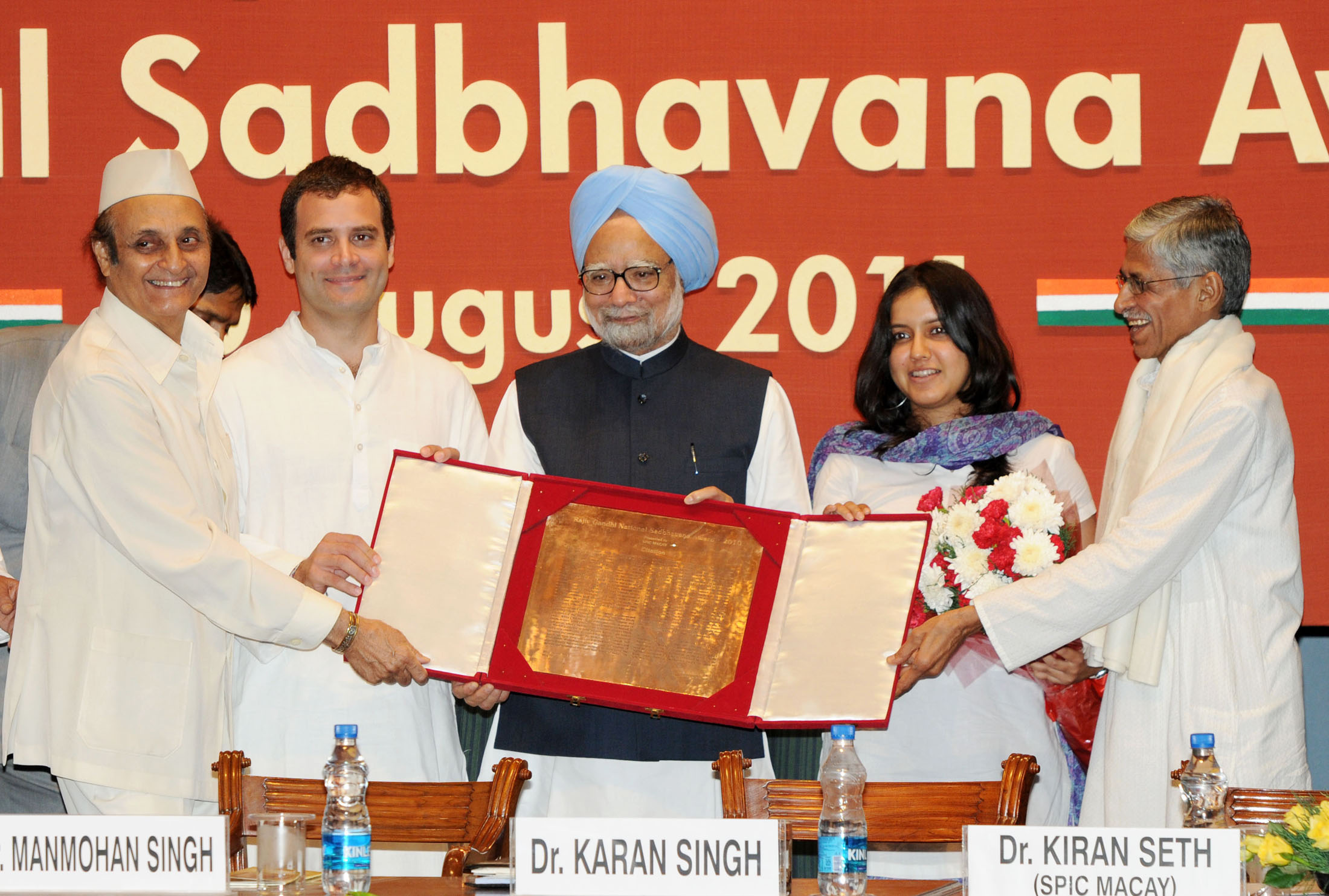
Karan Singh, along with Prime Minister Manmohan Singh and Rahul Gandhi present the Rajiv Gandhi National Sadbhavana Award to Kiran Seth in 2011.

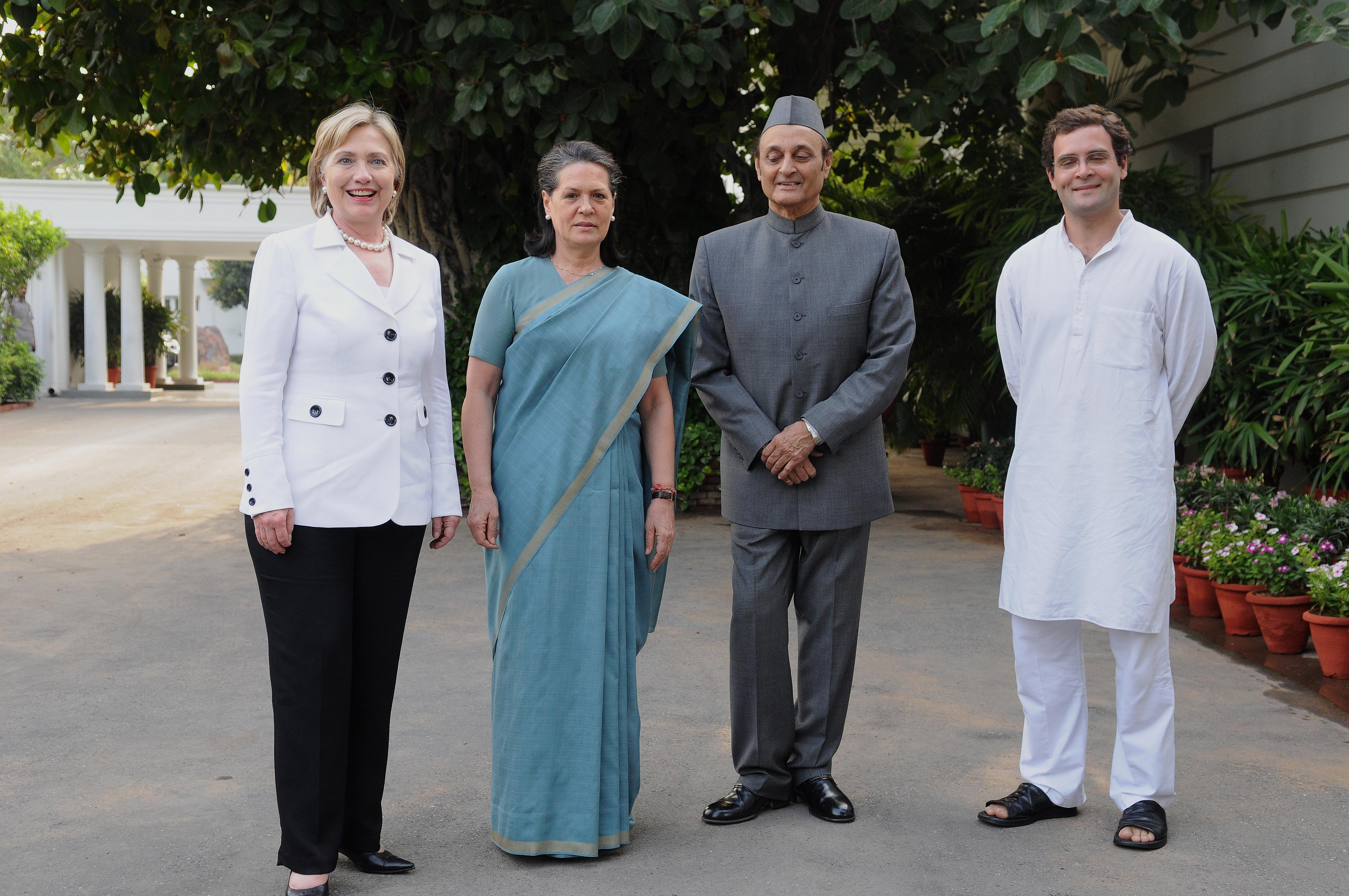
Karan Singh meets Hillary Clinton along with Congress party President Sonia Gandhi, and Rahul Gandhi. July 2009

=== Later life ===
Singh has been engaged by Sansad TV (a merged Global TV Channel of Lok Sabha TV and Rajya Sabha TV) as a Guest Anchor along with some other senior celebrated experts from diverse fields such as Bibek Debroy, Amitabh Kant, Shashi Tharoor, Hemant Batra, Maroof Raza and Sanjeev Sanyal to present some flagship programmes.

== Election contested ==
=== Lok Sabha ===
Year	Constituency	Party	Result	Tenure
1967	Udhampur	Indian National Congress	Won	1967-1971
1971	Udhampur	Indian National Congress	Won	1971-1977
1977	Udhampur	Indian National Congress	Won	1977-1980
1980	Udhampur	Indian National Congress (U)	Won	1980-1984
1984	Jammu	Independent	Lost	-

=== Rajya Sabha ===
Position	Party	Constituency	From	To	Tenure
Member of Parliament, Rajya Sabha (1st Term)	JKNC	Jammu & Kashmir	30 November 1996	12 August 1999	2 years, 255 days
Member of Parliament, Rajya Sabha (2nd Term)	INC	N.C.T. Delhi	28 January 2000	27 January 2006	17 years, 364 days
Member of Parliament, Rajya Sabha (3rd Term)	INC	N.C.T. Delhi	28 January 2006	27 January 2012	17 years, 364 days
Member of Parliament, Rajya Sabha (4th Term)	INC	N.C.T. Delhi	28 January 2012	27 January 2018	17 years, 364 days

== Academic career ==
Karan Singh served as the chancellor of Banaras Hindu University for three terms up until 2018. In 2008, he awarded an honorary doctorate to the then prime minister Manmohan Singh, and in 2016, he was asked by university administration to award an honorary doctorate to prime minister Narendra Modi, that the prime minister declined.

== Honours and awards ==
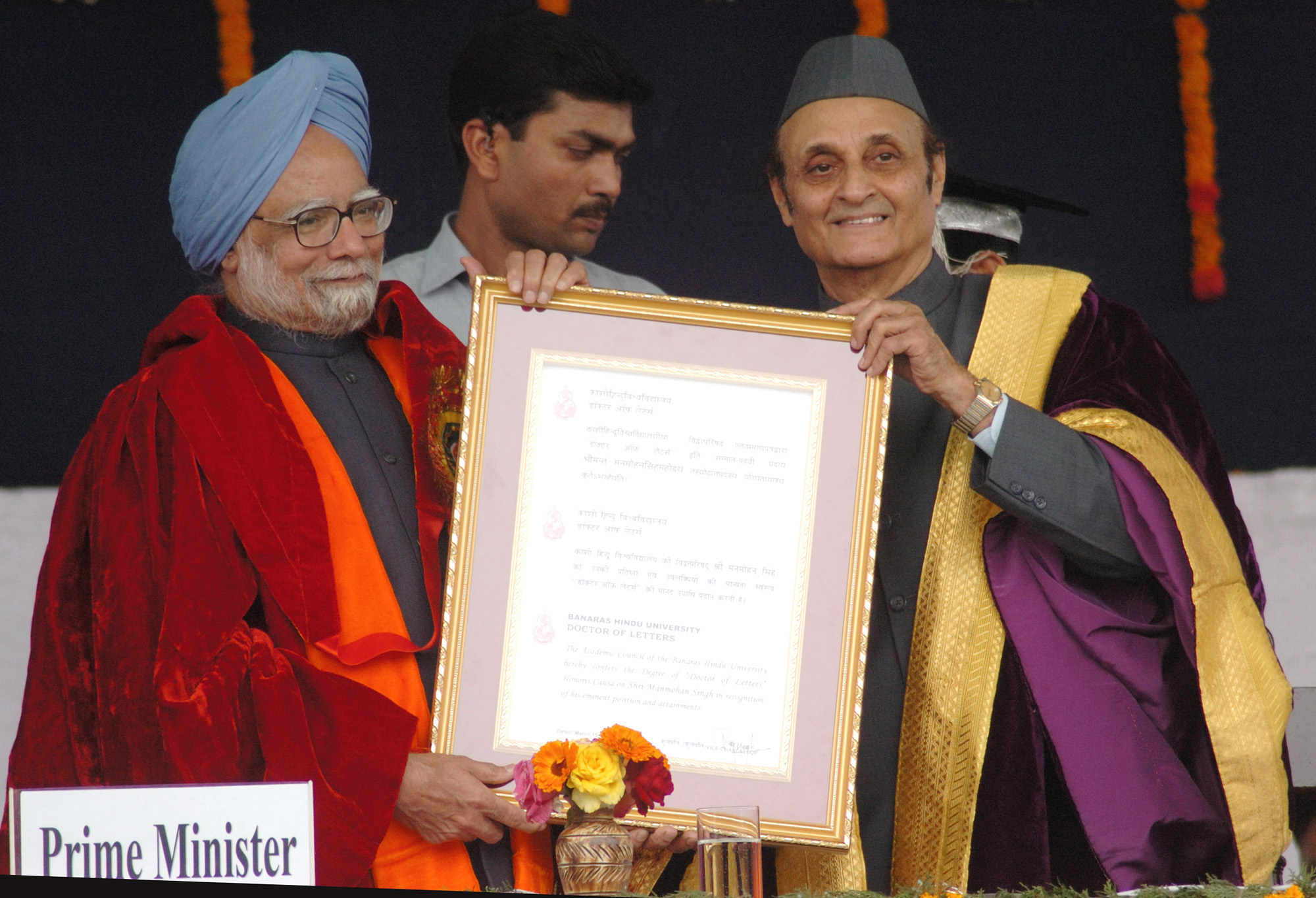
Singh presenting Honorary Doctorate Degree to the Prime Minister, Manmohan Singh, at the '90th Convocation Ceremony' in Varanasi on 15 March 2008

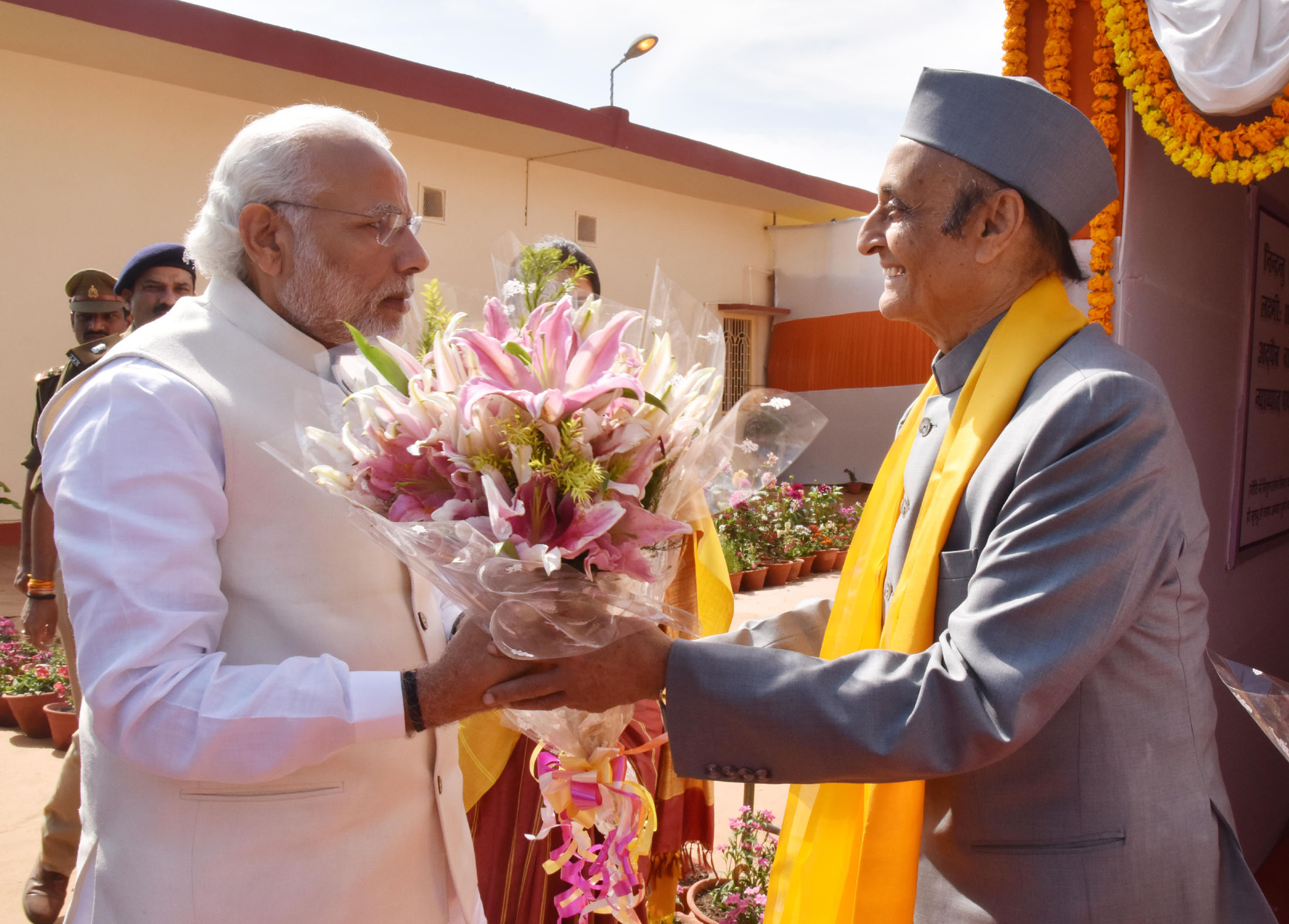
Prime Minister Narendra Modi being welcomed by Singh, on his arrival at the Banaras Hindu University, in Varanasi on February 22, 2016.

India:

- Padma Vibhushan (2005).

== Views ==
=== On population ===
"In 1974, I led the Indian delegation to the World Population Conference in Bucharest, where my statement that 'development is the best contraceptive' became widely known and oft quoted. I must admit that 20 years later I am inclined to reverse this, and my position now is that 'contraception is the best development'.”

== Bibliography ==
- Towards A New India (1974)
- Population, Poverty and the Future of India (1975)
- One Man's World (1986)
- Essays on Hinduism. Ratna Sagar. 1987. ISBN 81-7070-173-2.
- Humanity at the Crossroads, with Daisaku Ikeda. Oxford University Press, 1988.
- Autobiography (2 vols.)(1989)
- Brief Sojourn (1991)
- Hymn to Shiva and Other Poems (1991)
- The Transition to a Global Society (1991)
- Mountain of Shiva (1994)
- Autobiography. Oxford University Press, 1994. ISBN 0-19-563636-8.
- Hinduism. Sterling Publishers Pvt. Ltd, 2005. ISBN 1-84557-425-7
- Mundaka Upanishad: The Bridge to Immortality.
- Ten Gurus of the Sikhs Their Life Story, Tr. into English Pramila Naniwadekar & Moreshwar Naniwadekar.
- Nehru's Kashmir. Wisdom Tree. ISBN 978-81-8328-160-7.
- A Treasury of Indian Wisdom. Penguin Ananda, 2010. ISBN 978-0-670-08450-0.
- An Examined Life ed. Raghav Verma. Harper Collins, 2019. ISBN 9353570239

== See also ==
- Instrument of Accession (Jammu and Kashmir) to the Dominion of India
- List of topics on the land and the people of Jammu and Kashmir

Political offices
Preceded by Post created following abdication of Hari Singh	Prince Regent of Jammu and Kashmir; 1949–1952	Succeeded by Head of State of Jammu and Kashmir (Sadr-i-Riyasat)
Preceded by Prince Regent of Jammu and Kashmir	Head of State of Jammu and Kashmir (Sadr-i-Riyasat); 1952–1965	Succeeded by Succeeded by that of Governor of Jammu and Kashmir
Preceded by Head of State of Jammu and Kashmir (Sadr-i-Riyasat)	Governor of Jammu and Kashmir; 1965–1967	Succeeded by Bhagwan Sahay
Preceded by Ministry established	Minister of Tourism and Civil Aviation; 13 March 1967 – 9 November 1973	Succeeded by R. Bahadur
Preceded by Uma Shankar Dikshit	Minister of Health and Family Planning; 9 November 1973 – 24 March 1977	Succeeded by Raj Narain
Preceded by	Minister of Education and Culture; 1979–1980	Succeeded by
Preceded by P.K. Kaul	Indian Ambassador to the United States; 1989–1990	Succeeded by Abid Hussain
