= Acharya Pratishtha =

Author, Indian diplomat, Yoga Guru, Kathak Exponent

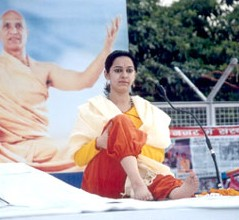
- Acharya Pratishtha teaching yoga

Director, Mokshayatan Yog Sansthan
- Incumbent
- Assumed office 01 December 2020
- Preceded by: Sanjay Sharma
- Succeeded by: Balwant Thakur

Director IGCIC, HCI Mauritius Ministry of External Affairs
- In office 10 November 2017 – 27 November 2020

Kathak/YogaTeacherEmbassy of India to Indonesia
- In office 24 December 2013 – 08 April 2015

Personal details
- Born: Pratishtha Sharma; 1 December 1983 (age 42) Saharanpur
- Spouse: Dheeraj Saraswat
- Children: 1
- Education: Bachelor of Arts MA
- Alma mater: University of Delhi National Institute of Kathak Dance Indira Kala Sangeet Vishwavidyalaya
- Occupation: Yoga guru; Author; Kathak exponent; Director of Mokshayatan Yog Sansthan
- Known for: Yoga Kathak Diplomat
- Website: www.acharyapratishtha.in

YouTube information
- Channel: Bharat Yoga
- Years active: 2008–present
- Genre: HealthYogaCulture
- Subscribers: 1.74 million
- Views: 195.86 million
- Last updated: 11 Dec 2025

Acharya Pratishtha (born Pratishtha Sharma) is an Indian yoga guru, Kathak performer, author and former diplomat who is the director of Mokshayatan Yog Sansthan.

== Early life ==
Pratishtha was born in Saharanpur, Uttar Pradesh to Swami Bharat Bhushan. She graduated from Delhi University and Indira Kala Sangeet Vishwavidyalaya.

== Career ==
Acharya Pratishtha is a yoga and Kathak instructor. She is an expert of Indian culture and soft diplomacy and has worked as the director of the world's largest Indian culture center situated in Mauritius under the High Commission of India. She was also posted at the Indian Culture Center at the Indian embassy in Jakarta. She has appeared on television shows and has written books on her subject. She is the member of several Indian Government committees of yoga and culture.

Acharya Pratishtha has written 5 books on Kathak and yoga. Her first book, DIABETES, Why Die-a-bit-ease?, was published when she was 25 years of age. She wrote her first bilingual book in Bahasa Indonesia and English, Essential elements of kathak, which was published by the Indian embassy in Indonesia and the Ministry of External Affairs.

Pratishtha promotes and propagates yoga internationally and is regularly involved in the Indian government's yoga-related projects. She has spoken on several topics about the benefits of yoga. She is the member of the Committee for Yoga Protocol on Diabetes formed by the Minister of Ayush. An acknowledged Kathak dancer, she has performed at several festivals in India and abroad.

== Filmography ==
=== Television ===
| Year | Title | Channel | Notes | Ref |
|---|---|---|---|---|
| 2020 | Yog Namaskar | Zee News | 303 episodes | |
| 2021 | Yog Sammelan | ABP News | | |
| 2017 | 2 minute me Yog | ABP News | More than 100 episodes | |
| 2021 | IDY 21 | Rajasthan Patrika- Patrika News | | |
| 2018 | 21din me Yog | ABP News | 21 episodes | |
| 2022 | Yog Sutra | DD News | | |
| 2020 | Ghar par Yog | Rajya Sabha TV | | |
| 2020 | Yog or Jeevan | Lok Sabha TV | | |
| 2020 | Yoga with Acharya Pratishtha | News 24 (Indian TV channel) | | |
| 2020 | Yoga for Everyone | Jantantra TV | | |
| 2021 | Diplomatic Dispatch | Sansad TV | | |
| 2022 | Hindustan E-Vimarsh | Zee Hindustan | | |

== Bibliography ==
1. "DIABETES, Why Die-a-bit-ease?" Health Care. January 2010.
2. "Essential elements of kathak" Classical Dance Kathak. January 2014.
3. Pratishtha, Acharya (December 2015). "Lets Learn Kathak-1" Classical Dance Kathak.
4. "Yoga for Healthy Life" Health Care. Acharya Pratishtha. December 2016. ISBN 978-93-5031-766-2.
5. "Lets Learn Yoga-1" Health Care. May 2015.

== Awards and honors ==
Pratishtha was awarded the International Ayurveda Samman by the Association of Ayurvedic Physician, GOM, Mauritius as well as the Dainik Jagran Samman for contribution in the fields of yoga and Kathak and the Tejaswini Samman, the latter of which she received from the Vice President of India) by Doordarshan.

== Personal life ==
Pratishtha is married and has one daughter.
