= List of by-elections to the Jammu and Kashmir Legislative Assembly =

The following is a list of by-elections held for the Jammu and Kashmir Legislative Assembly, India, since its formation in 1952.

== 12th Assembly ==
Date	Constituency		MLA before election	Party before election	Elected MLA	Party after election
22 June 2016	1	Anantnag	Mufti Mohammed Sayeed	Jammu and Kashmir People's Democratic Party	Mehbooba Mufti	Jammu and Kashmir People's Democratic Party

== 13th Assembly ==
Date	Constituency		Previous MLA		Reason	Elected MLA	
11 November 2025	27	Budgam	Omar Abdullah	Jammu & Kashmir National Conference	Resigned on 21 October 2024	Aga Syed Muntazir Mehdi	Jammu & Kashmir Peoples Democratic Party
11 November 2025	77	Nagrota	Devender Singh Rana	Bharatiya Janata Party	Died on 31 October 2024	Devyani Singh Rana	Bharatiya Janata Party
