= Vikramaditya Singh (Jammu and Kashmir politician) =

Indian politician

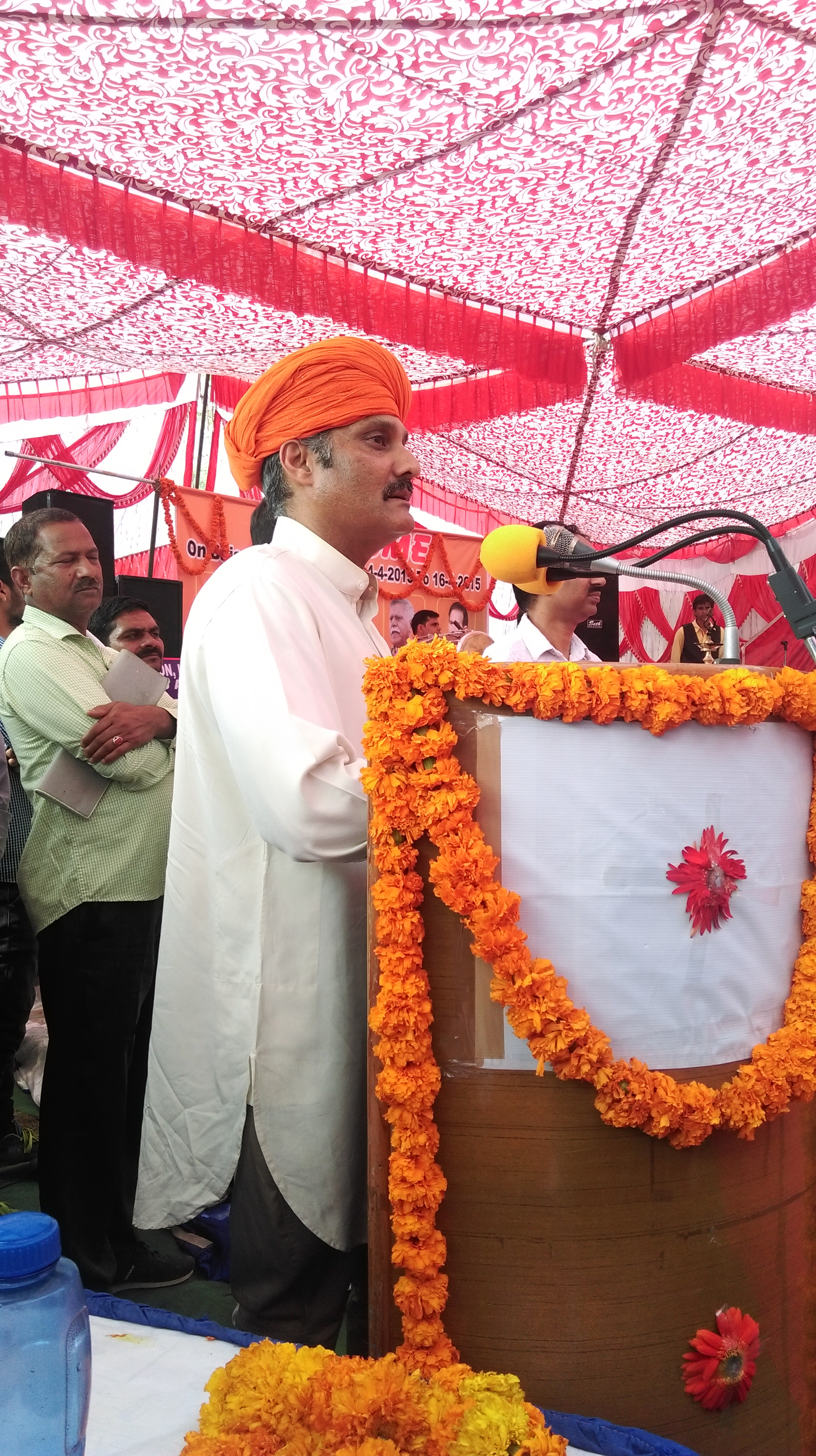
- Vikramaditya Singh, then PDP MLC, speaking at an official program at Billawar, Kathua

Personal details
- Born: 5 August 1964 (age 62) Jammu, India
- Party: Independent
- Other political affiliations: Indian National Congress (2018-2022); Jammu and Kashmir Peoples Democratic Party (2014-2017)
- Spouse: Yuvrani Chitrangada Raje Singh
- Parent(s): Karan Singh and Yasho Rajya Lakshmi
- Relatives: Dogra dynasty Ajatshatru Singh (Brother)
- Occupation: Politician

Vikramaditya Singh (born 5 August 1964) is an Indian businessman and politician. He was a leader of Indian National Congress (INC) and an ex-member of Jammu and Kashmir Legislative Council. He is the grandson of Maharaja Sir Hari Singh, who was the last ruler of the Indian princely state of Kashmir. He is the titular heir apparent of the Dogra dynasty.

== Background and hotelier career ==
Singh is a son of senior Indian National Congress (INC) leader and former Sadr-e-Riyasat Karan Singh and Yasho Rajya Lakshmi, granddaughter of the last Rana dynasty Prime Minister of Nepal, Mohan Shumsher Jang Bahadur Rana. Singh completed his education at the University of Southern California. He is a hotelier by profession and managing director of Taragarh Palace Hotel, Kangra.

== Political career ==
In August 2014, he joined Jammu and Kashmir Peoples Democratic Party (PDP). In October 2017, he resigned as member of legislative council and PDP over the issue of holiday on the birthday of his grandfather Maharaja Hari Singh. He later joined INC. He was the Lok Sabha INC candidate from Udhampur Lok Sabha constituency in 2019 where he lost to Dr Jitendra Singh of BJP.

On 22nd March 2022, he tendered his resignation from the primary membership of INC citing that it was his belief that "the Indian National Congress is unable to realize and reflect the sentiments and aspirations of the people of Jammu and Kashmir."

== Personal life ==
Singh married Chitrangada Scindia, the daughter Madhavrao Scindia, a politician and the former Maharaja of Gwalior, in 1987. They have two children, a son, Martand Singh, and a daughter, Mriganka Singh. Vikramaditya is a trustee of J&K Dharmarth Trust that was founded by Maharaja Gulab Singh. In 2017, his daughter, Mriganka married Nirvan Singh, the grandson of Amarinder Singh, former Chief Minister of Punjab and member of the former Patiala royal family.

== Ancestry ==
Ancestors of Vikramaditya Singh (Jammu and Kashmir politician)

16. Ranbir Singh, Maharaja of Jammu and Kashmir
8. Amar Singh of Jammu and Kashmir
4. Hari Singh, Maharaja of Jammu and Kashmir
2. Karan Singh, Maharaja of Jammu and Kashmir
10. Bali Ram Chand Katoch, Zamindar of Bijapur in Kangra district
5. Tara Devi of Bijapur in Kangra district
1. Vikramaditya Singh
24. Chandra Shamsher Jang Bahadur Rana, Maharaja of Kaski and Lamjung
12. Mohan Shamsher Jang Bahadur Rana, Maharaja of Kaski and Lamjung
25. Chandra Loka Bhakta Lakshmi Devi, Bada Maharani of Kaski and Lamjung
6. General Sharada Shumsher Jung Bahadur Rana of Nepal
26. Kunwar Indar Bir Singh Rathor of Doti Nepal
13. Dikshya Kumari, Bada Maharani of Kaski and Lamjung
3. Yasho Rajya Lakshmi Devi
7. Sri Rani Bina Rajya Lakshmi Devi
