= Chitrangada Singh (princess) =

Indian business woman

Chitrangada Singh Yuvrani Chitrangada Raje Singn
- Born: 5 February 1967 (age 59); Oxford, England
- Occupation: Businesswoman
- Spouse: Vikramaditya Singh
- Parent(s): Madhavrao Scindia and Madhaviraje Scindia
- Relatives: Jiwajirao Scindia (grandfather); Ajatshatru Singh (brother-in-law)

Chitrangada Singh (née Raje Scindia; born 1967) is an Indian businesswoman and a descendant of the former ruling Scindia Dynasty, a major princely state during the British Raj in India.

She is the eldest child of the late Madhavrao Scindia, an Indian politician and a granddaughter of Jiwajirao Scindia, the last ruling Maharaja of Gwalior. She married in 1987 to the grandson of Hari Singh, the last ruling Maharaja of Jammu and Kashmir—an extravagant social event in a drought-ridden India—was covered widely in the Indian and international press. She is the co-manager of two heritage hotels: Karan Mahal in Srinagar and Taragarh Palace in the Kangra valley.

== Background ==
Chitrangada Raje Scindia was born in Oxford, England, in February 1967. Her father was studying at the University of Oxford at the time; the family lived in a two-bedroom cottage that had no central heating—her parents doing the housework including chopping wood. After her parents' return to India, Chitrangada enrolled in Welham Girls' School in Dehradun.

== Wedding ==
Chitrangada's mother Madhaviraje Scindia and paternal grandmother Vijayaraje Scindia both hailed from the Rana family of Nepal, and Maharaja Yasho Rajyalakshmi of Jammu and Kashmir, wife of Maharaja Karan Singh also hailed from the same family. The two families were therefore well known to each other, and they arranged the wedding of their children in the usual Indian way. This is despite the fact that the Dogra dynasty of Jammu and Kashmir belongs to the Jamwal Rajput community of the far north of India, and the Scindias belong to the Maratha community of western and central India. Considerations of community background were set aside because Maharaja Karan Singh was known for his progressive views, and because the Scindias had already received two generations of Rajput brides from Nepal anyway.

On 11 December 1987, Chitrangada Raje married the politician Vikramaditya Singh, the son of Karan Singh, a philosopher and politician who was the first Sadr-i-Riyasat of Indian state of Jammu and Kashmir and also the son of Hari Singh, the last ruler of the princely state of Jammu and Kashmir.

== Hospitality business ==
Chitrangada Scindia Singh (Yuvrani Chitrangada Raje) and her husband Yuvraj Vikramaditya Singh have carved out a presence in the heritage hospitality space by co-managing two boutique hotels, Karan Mahal in Srinagar and Taragarh Palace in Himachal Pradesh with a shared focus on authenticity of culture.
