= LSTV =

LSTV may refer to:

- Leeds Student Television
- Lok Sabha Television
- Lumbosacral transitional vertebra
