= Building Blocks of Bharat =

TV series in India

Building blocks of Bharat is a television series produced by Vigyan Prasar and telecast on a number of channels including Rajya Sabha TV in India. This 13-part series which focuses on India's architectural marvels from ancient, medieval to the designing of Lutyens' Delhi.

This series takes the viewer across India through the eyes of its anchor, Arjun Bhagat, who is a journalist and amateur history and science buff. The series covers over 70 major monuments many of them World Heritage Sites. The show focuses on understanding India's architectural skills through the ages and the in-depth knowledge of the builders be it climatic conditions, the terrain, tools and material they used to create what are some of the most sophisticated architectural monuments and engineering skills on planet earth. The series is directed by Arjun Bhagat and Radhika Chandrashekar.

And the series is by IMAK News & Entertainment Private Limited for Vigyan Prasar.

== Episodes ==
Episode number	Title
1	Settling in – The evolution of settlement
2	The Indus angle – The science of Harappan cities
3	Ancient Hydrology- Interesting water structures & the science behind them
4	Going with the flow- A further exploration of water structures in ancient India
5	The Brick Angle- The evolution and use of bricks in India
6	Set in Stone- Stone structures across different periods of Indian history
7	Touch Wood- Exploring wood structures in India
8	Holding Fort- Forts and the science behind a fortification
9	Different Temples Styles and the Science that powered them
10	Doors, Domes & other details – The evolution of a range of details like the arch and the dome
11	Description: Sounding it out- The acoustics in a range of Indian monuments
12	Form, Patterns and Design – Interesting scientific nuances that power architecture
13	Reach for the Stars- Ancient India's understanding of Astronomy
