= Devender Singh Rana =

Indian politician (1965–2024)

Member of Jammu and Kashmir Legislative Council
- In office 2007–2013
- In office 2013–2014

Member of Jammu and Kashmir Legislative Assembly
- In office 23 December 2014 – 31 October 2019
- Preceded by: Jugal Kishore Sharma
- In office 8 October 2024 – 31 October 2024
- Succeeded by: Devyani Singh Rana
- Constituency: Nagrota

Personal details
- Born: 1965 India
- Died: 31 October 2024 (aged 59) Faridabad, Haryana, India
- Party: Bharatiya Janata Party (2021–2024)
- Other political affiliations: Jammu & Kashmir National Conference (Till 2021)
- Relatives: Jitendra Singh (brother)
- Education: (B.Tech.); NIT Kurukshetra
- Occupation: Politician

Devender Singh Rana (1965 – 31 October 2024) was an Indian politician from Jammu and Kashmir. He was an MLA from Nagrota, Jammu and Kashmir Assembly constituency in Jammu district as a member of the Bharatiya Janata Party.

== Early life and education ==
Rana was from Malhori village, in the Chenab Valley region, Doda District and was settled in Gandhi Nagar, Jammu district, Jammu and Kashmir. His Constituency was Nagrota, Jammu. He was the son of Rajinder Singh Rana, and brother of senior BJP leader and MP Jitendra Singh. He completed his B.Sc. and Civil Engineering in 1986 at NIT, Kurukshetra.

== Career ==
Rana became an MLA for the first time winning from Nagrota Assembly constituency representing the Jammu and Kashmir National Conference in the 2014 Jammu and Kashmir Legislative Assembly election. He polled 23,678 votes and defeated his nearest rival, Nand Kishore of Bharatiya Janata Party, by a margin of 4,048 votes. He regained the Nagrota seat in the 2024 Assembly election as a member of the Bharatiya Janata Party by defeating National Conference candidate Joginder Singh by a margin of 30,472 votes.

== Electoral performance ==
Election	Constituency	Party	Result	Votes %	Opposition Candidate	Opposition Party	Opposition vote %	Ref
2024	Nagrota, Jammu and Kashmir	BJP	Won	64.94%	Joginder Singh	JKNC	23.81%	
2014	Nagrota, Jammu and Kashmir	JKNC	Won	39.03%	Nand Kishore	BJP	32.35%	

== Personal life and death ==
Rana was the younger brother of Union minister Jitendra Singh.

Rana died after a brief illness at Mata Amritanandamayi Hospital in Faridabad, on 31 October 2024.
