= Jitendra Singh =

Indian politician (born 1956)

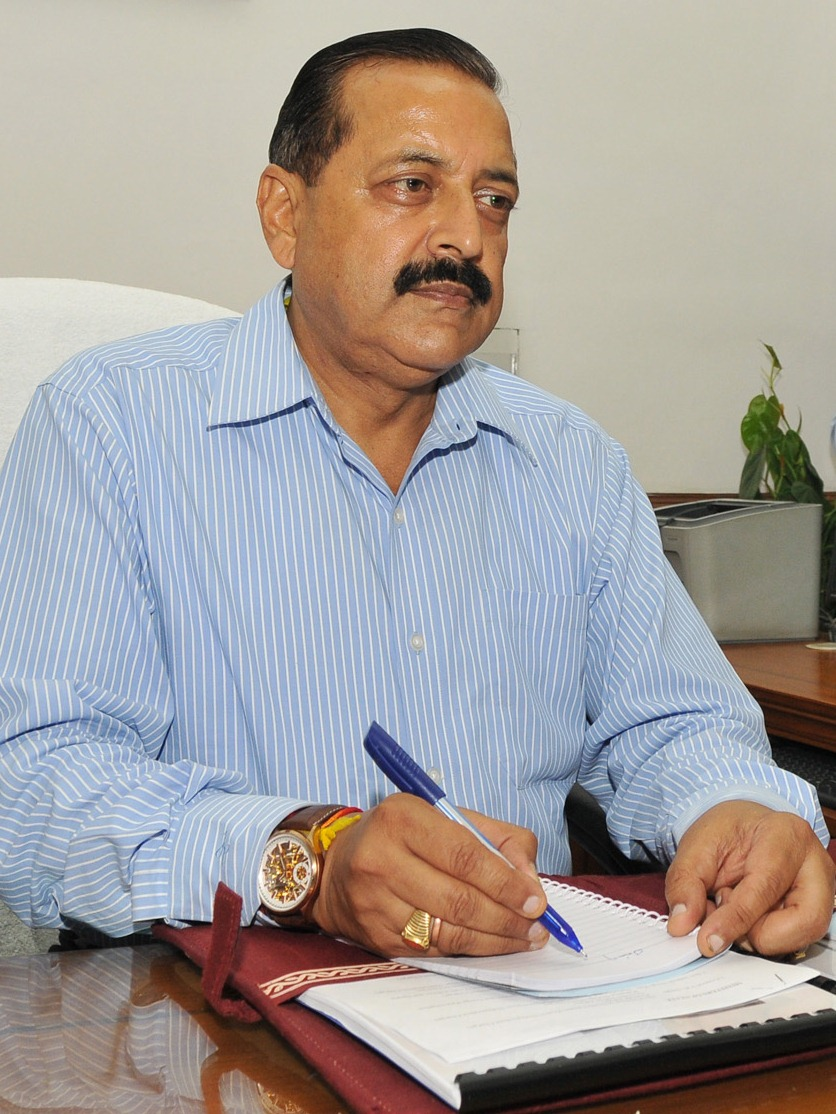
- Official portrait, 2025

Minister of State for Prime Minister's Office
- Incumbent
- Assumed office 26 May 2014
- President: Ramnath Kovind; Droupadi Murmu
- Prime Minister: Narendra Modi
- Preceded by: V. Narayanasamy

Union Minister of State for Personnel, Public Grievances and Pensions
- Incumbent
- Assumed office 26 May 2014
- Prime Minister: Narendra Modi
- Preceded by: V. Narayanasamy

Union Minister of State for the Department of Space and Department of Atomic Energy
- Incumbent
- Assumed office 26 May 2014
- Prime Minister: Narendra Modi

Union Minister of State (Independent Charge) for Earth Sciences
- In office 7 July 2021 – 18 May 2023
- Prime Minister: Narendra Modi
- Preceded by: Harsh Vardhan
- Succeeded by: Kiren Rijiju
- In office 26 May 2014 – 8 November 2014
- Prime Minister: Narendra Modi
- Preceded by: Jaipal Reddy
- Succeeded by: Harsh Vardhan

Union Minister of State (Independent Charge) for Development of North Eastern Region
- In office 9 November 2014 – 7 July 2021
- Prime Minister: Narendra Modi
- Preceded by: V. K. Singh
- Succeeded by: G. Kishan Reddy

Union Minister of State (Independent Charge) for Science and Technology
- Incumbent
- Assumed office 7 July 2021
- Prime Minister: Narendra Modi
- Preceded by: Harsh Vardhan
- In office 26 May 2014 – 8 November 2014
- Prime Minister: Narendra Modi
- Preceded by: Jaipal Reddy
- Succeeded by: Harsh Vardhan

Member of Parliament, Lok Sabha
- Incumbent
- Assumed office 16 May 2014
- Preceded by: Chaudhary Lal Singh
- Constituency: Udhampur, J&K

Minister of State (Independent Charge) for Youth Affairs and Sports
- In office 23 May 2016 – 5 July 2016
- Preceded by: Sarbananda Sonowal
- Succeeded by: Vijay Goel

Personal details
- Born: Jitendra Singh Rana; 6 November 1956 (age 70) Jammu, Jammu and Kashmir, India
- Party: Bharatiya Janata Party
- Spouse: Manju Singh (m. 1982)
- Children: 2
- Relatives: Devender Singh Rana (brother) Devyani Singh Rana (niece)
- Education: Stanley Medical College, Chennai (MBBS); Government Medical College, Jammu (M.D.)
- Profession: Physician
- Website: drjitendrasingh.in

Jitendra Singh Rana (born 6 November 1956) is an Indian physician and politician who is serving as the Minister of Science and Technology and Minister of Earth Sciences since 2024; and Minister of State for the Prime Minister's Office, Ministry of Personnel, Public Grievances and Pensions, Department of Atomic Energy and Department of Space. He was elected to the 18th Lok Sabha from Udhampur with a majority of 124,373 votes.

He is a Bharatiya Janata Party (BJP) national executive member and was the chief spokesperson for the union territory of Jammu and Kashmir. He won the Udhampur seat in the Indian general election, 2014 and 2019 with highest ever margin of votes for the 16th Lok Sabha and 17th Lok Sabha.

== Early life, personal life and education ==
Singh was born in Jammu, in the erstwhile Indian state of Jammu and Kashmir, into a Hindu Dogra Rajput family as the elder child to parents Rajinder Singh and Shanti Devi. His family belongs to the Marmat area in the Doda district.

Singh is a doctor, and he did his schooling at Scindia School, Gwalior, passing out in 1972. He completed his medical education at Stanley Medical College, Chennai, and All India Institute of Medical Sciences, New Delhi. He has two honorary doctorates.

Singh married Manju Singh. They have two sons.

== Professional career ==
Besides being a medical doctor, Singh has also worked as a newspaper columnist. Initially he wrote for Kashmir Times. Subsequently, he switched to Daily Excelsior, which is the largest circulated newspaper of Jammu and Kashmir. His weekly column Tales of Travesty used to feature in the editorial section of the newspaper until his election to the Lok Sabha in 2014.

He was a professor of diabetes and endocrinology, Life Patron, Research Society for Study of Diabetes in India (RSSDI); Founder Executive Member, Diabetes in Pregnancy Study India, a consultant, clinical practitioner, author of eight books, and a newspaper columnist. He is the ex-chairman for the National Scientific Committee Diabetes and the Research Society for the Study of Diabetes in India.

== Political career ==
=== Formative years ===
In 2008, Singh was appointed spokesperson of the Shri Amarnathji Sangharsh Samiti, an umbrella organisation of right wing parties during the Amarnath land transfer controversy. During his stint with the organisation, he took premature retirement as a professor of endocrinology in the Jammu Government Medical College to join the Bharatiya Janata Party in 2012. However, the party refused to make him a candidate for the 2009 Indian general election.

=== Parliamentary career ===
In March 2014, the party announced that Singh would contest the upcoming general election from Udhampur constituency in his native Jammu. His primary competitor was Ghulam Nabi Azad of the Indian National Congress party who was a former chief minister of the state. Singh was elected to the Lok Sabha after defeating Azad by a margin of 60,976 votes. Singh was polled 487,369 votes while Azad was polled 426,393 votes.

On 26 May 2014, Singh was appointed Minister of State in the Prime Minister's Office, Minister of State for Personnel, Public Grievances and Pensions, Minister of State for Department of Atomic Energy and Department of Space. He also became the Union Minister of State (Independent charge) in the Ministry of Science and Technology and Ministry of Earth Sciences.

In March 2019, the party renominated Singh as its candidate from the Udhampur constituency for the upcoming general election. His main rival was Vikramaditya Singh of the Congress party and supported by Jammu and Kashmir National Conference party – Vikramaditya Singh was also the grandson of Hari Singh, the last monarch of the former princely state. Jitendra Singh fought the election on his "development report card". Notable campaigners for him included Prime Minister Narendra Modi, party president Amit Shah, Home Minister Rajnath Singh, Ram Madhav and cricketer Gautam Gambhir. Jitendra Singh was re-elected to the Lok Sabha after defeating Vikramaditya Singh by approximately 350,000 votes. Jitendra Singh was polled 7,15,406 votes compared to his rival's 3,66,123 votes.

On 31 May 2019, it was announced that Singh had retained his ministries in the Second Modi ministry. Singh was re-elected in 2024 and retained his ministries in Third Modi ministry.

== Minister of Science and Technology ==
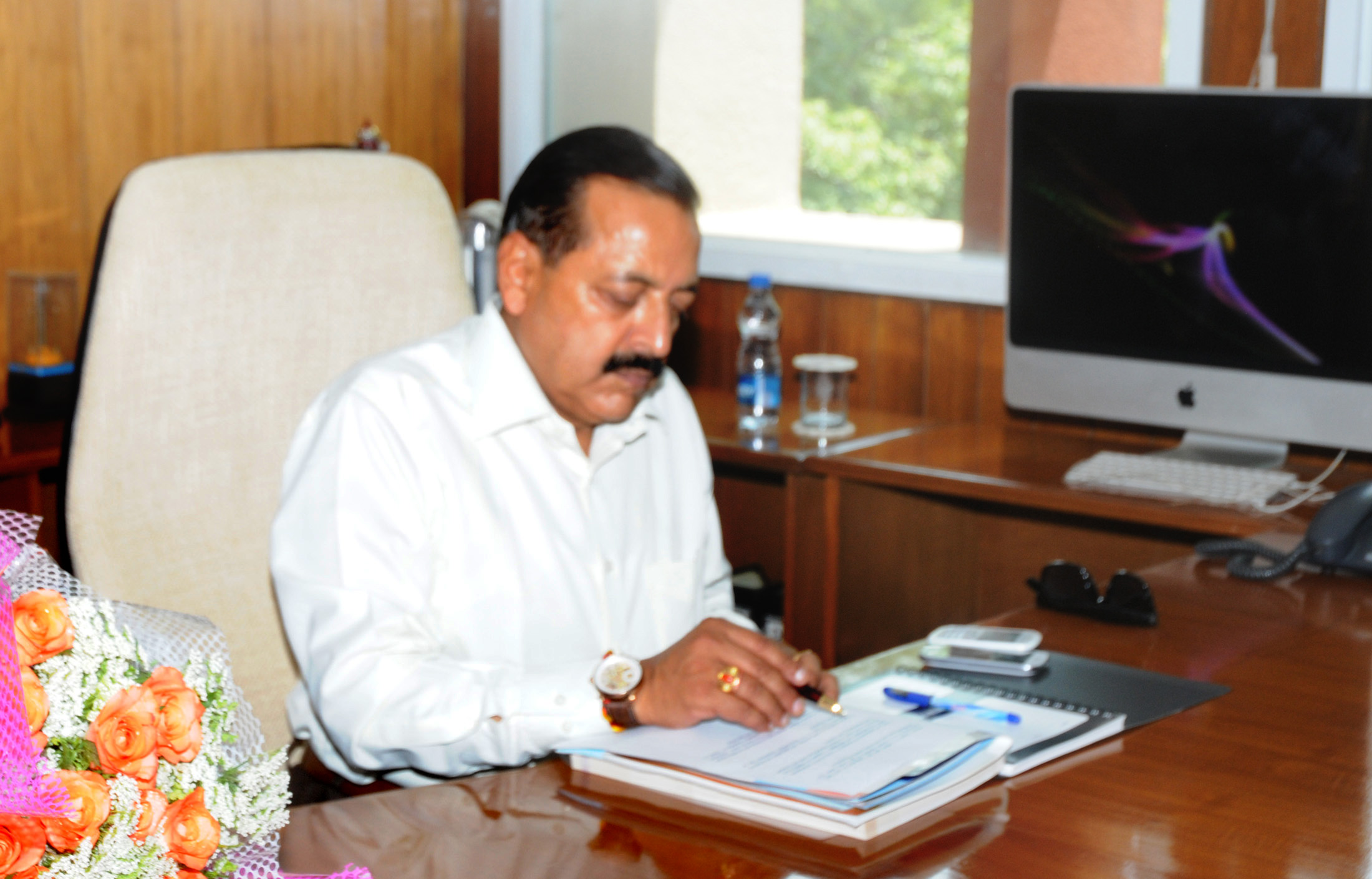
Jitendra Singh as Minister of Science and Technology on 28 May 2014

As a minister of science and technology, Singh launched India's first indigenously made research vessel named "Sindhu Sadhana" on 14 July 2014 from Mormugao harbour in Goa. In a written response to the Lok Sabha on 31 July, he announced that India had signed cooperative arrangements with 33 countries for "peaceful use of outer space". He further added that areas of co-operation included remote sensing of earth, launch services, satellite communication, telemetry, space exploration and space law. He further launched India's first home-made broad spectrum confocal microscope on 7 October at New Delhi. He announced that the government was considering increasing the retirement age of scientists to 62 years. The ministry increased the stipend of researchers by 50% at the end of the month. On 8 November 2014, Singh was replaced by Harsh Vardhan, another doctor as the minister of science and technology and earth sciences. In July 2021 he replaced Harsh Vardhan as the minister of science and technology.

== Minister of State for Space and Atomic Energy ==
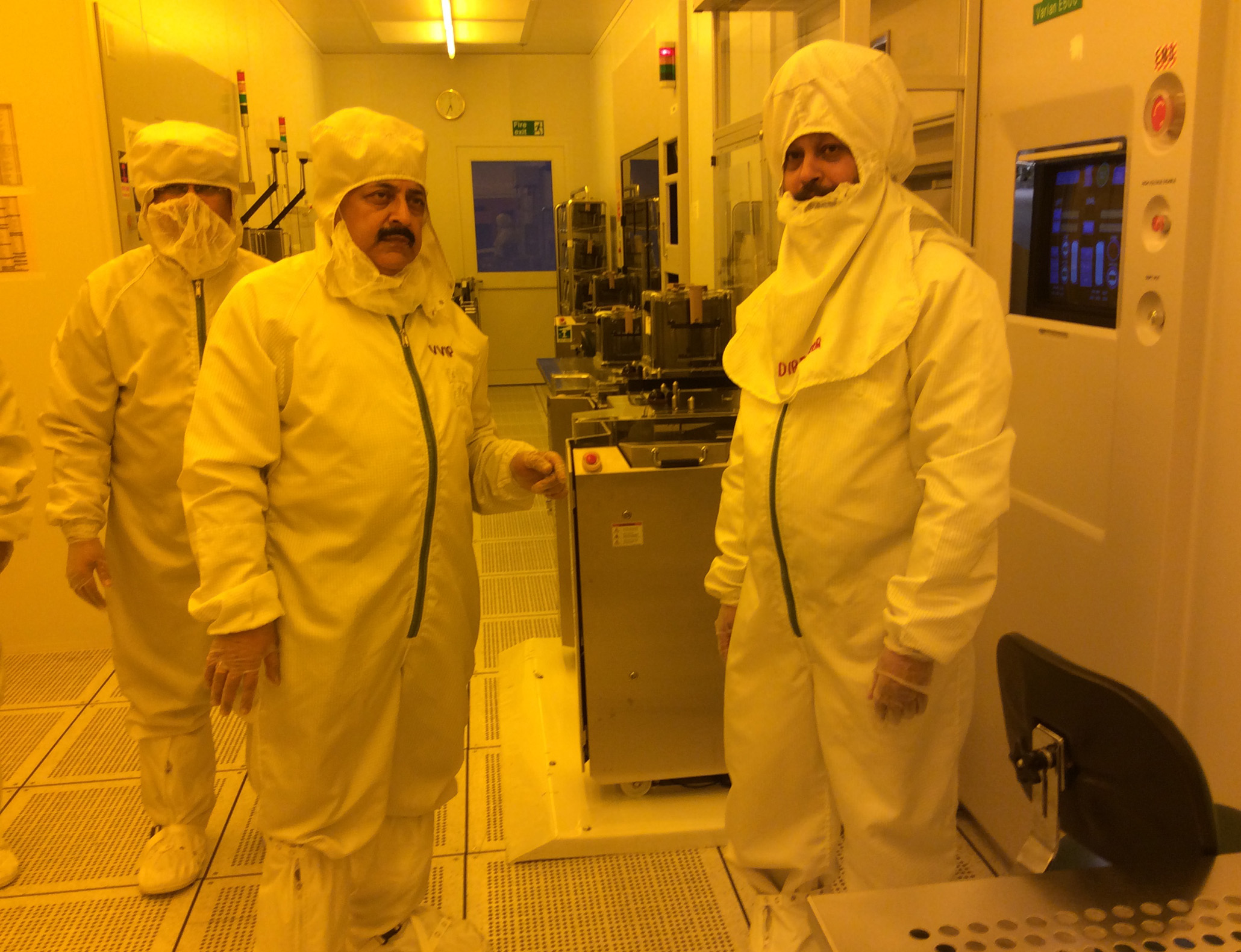
Singh visiting the Semiconductor Laboratory of the Department of Space

During Singh's ministership, the fourth Indian Regional Navigation Satellite System was launched by ISRO in April 2015 which would provide "navigation and communication facility to all the surrounding countries". On 29 April 2018, he along with ISRO chairman Kailasavadivu Sivan confirmed that India would send a crewed mission to the moon by 2022 as proposed by Prime Minister Modi.

== Minister of State for Personnel, Public Grievances and Pension ==
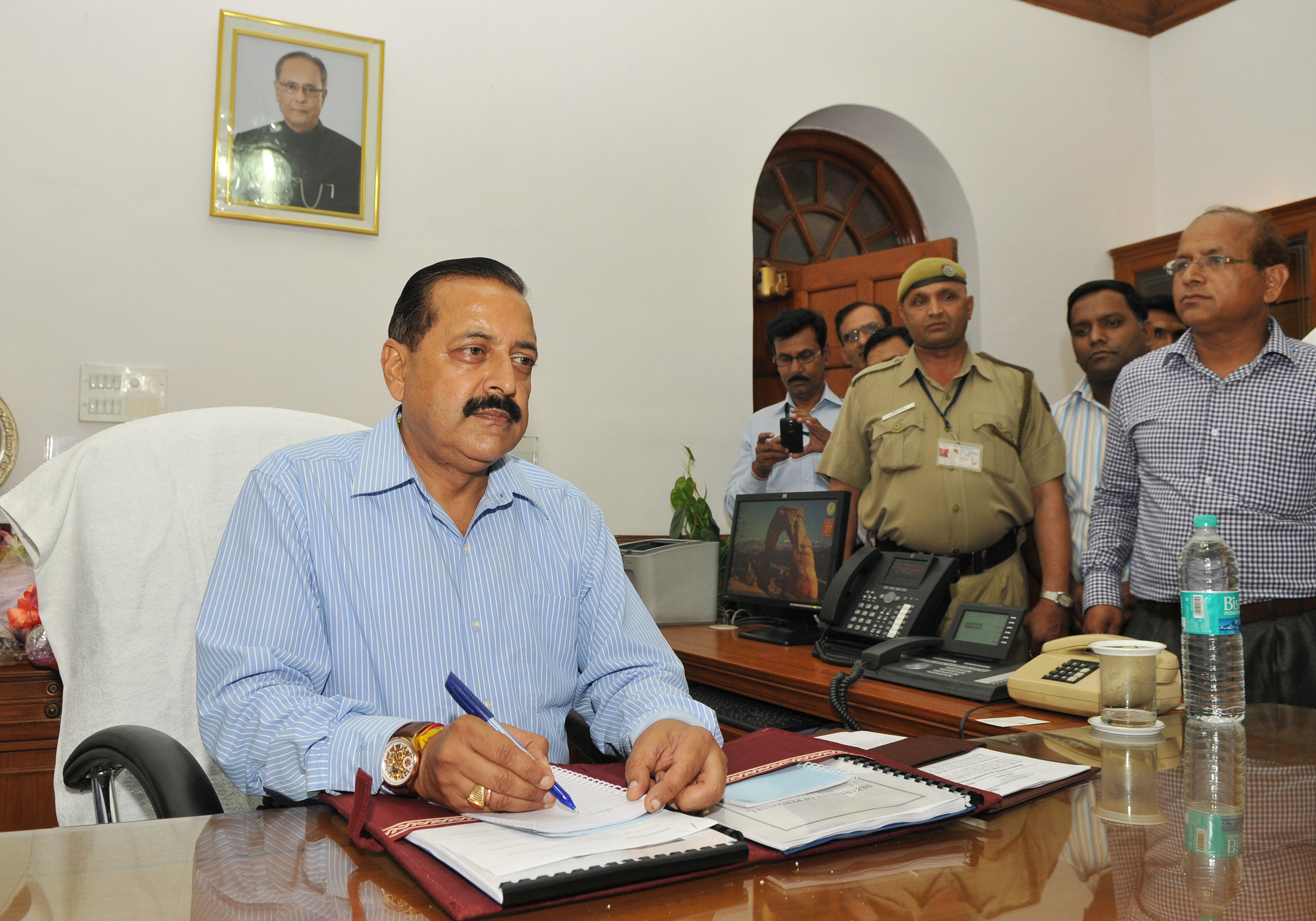
Singh taking charge as the Minister for State for Personnel, Public Grievances & Pensions, in New Delhi on 26 May 2014

During Singh's tenure as the minister of personnel, public grievances and pension, the Union Public Service Commission refused to count the marks of English comprehension in the Civil Services Aptitude Test. This violated the status quo of the question paper as suggested by the Arvind Varma committee. Interviews were discontinued for lower tier government jobs as well the need of attestation by a gazetted officer was also discontinued. On 20 March 2019, Pinaki Chandra Ghose, a former Supreme Court judge was appointed as India's first Lokpal.

== Minister of State for Development of North Eastern Region ==
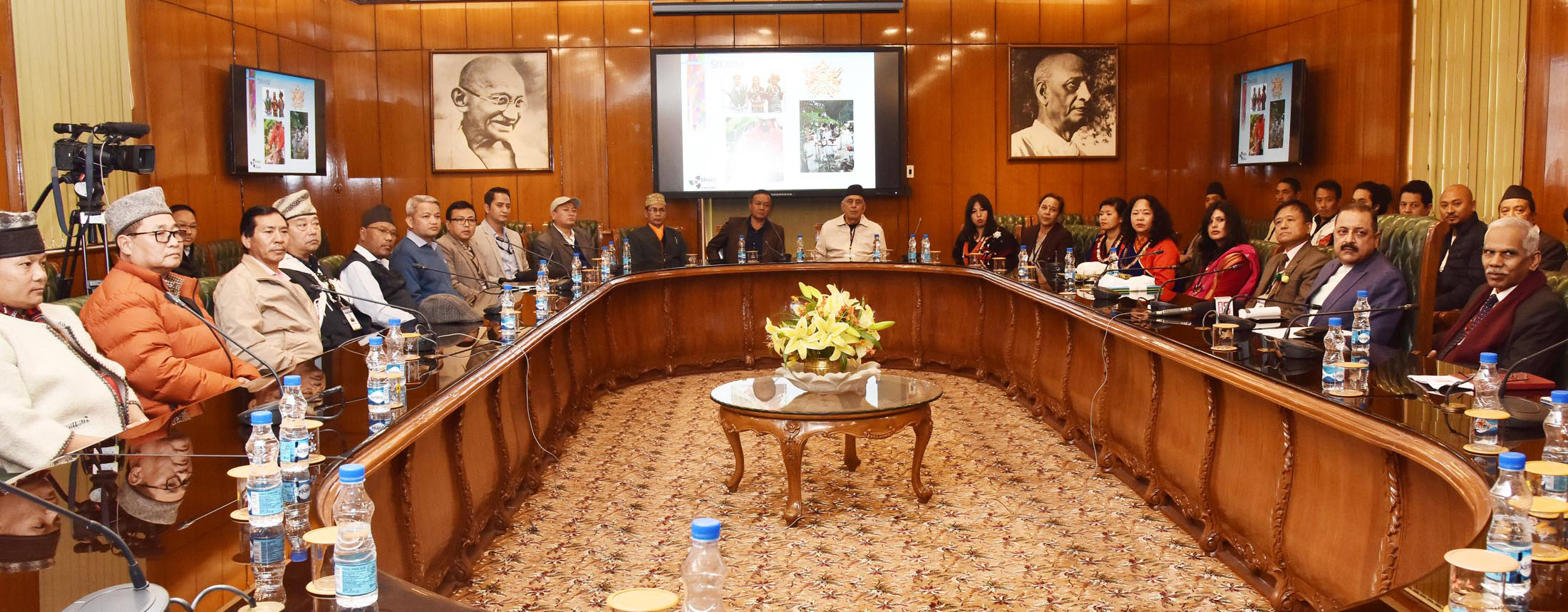
A delegation of indigenous communities from Sikkim meeting the Minister of State for Development of North Eastern Region (IC)

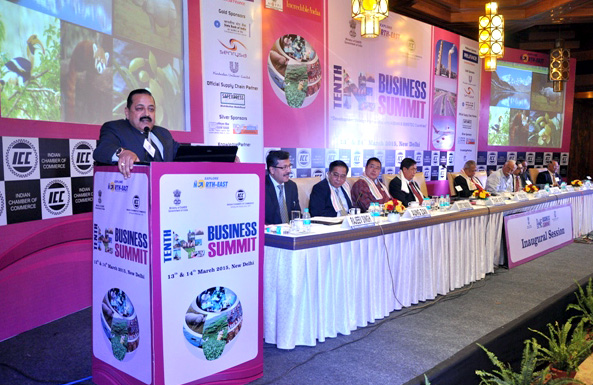
Singh addressing the inaugural session of the Northeast Business Summit

On 8 November 2014, in a cabinet reshuffle, Singh was appointed Minister of State (Independent charge) in the Ministry of Development of North Eastern Region and replaced Vijay Kumar Singh. In the ministry, he introduced the use of satellite imaging for surveying and building roads and for "preparation of utilisation certificates with fool-proof accuracy". He advised Sarbananda Sonowal, the Chief Minister of Assam to utilise the Assam Remote Sensing Application Centre to construct smart cities and in urban development. On 23 November 2015, Singh announced that the central government has decided to make Mizoram a "bamboo state" and the ministry proposed steps for the commercial utilisation of the state's bamboo potential.

In January 2016, he said that the Northeast India was "emerging destination for new Startups". In the Startup India scheme launched by Modi, the ministry added an additional incentive, "venture" funds. This fund would provide the aspiring entrepreneurs "relief from financial liabilities" and thus according to Singh, youth from other parts of India would "participate in the development of the North-Eastern States".

In September 2018, Pakyong Airport, Sikkim's first greenfield airport was inaugurated by Modi. Previously, Singh had set up a deadline of 2017. In the same month, he announced that an airport would also be built in Arunachal Pradesh.

=== 2014 Jammu and Kashmir election ===
On 17 November 2014, the party announced that Singh was appointed the head of the 18-member Election Campaign Committee for the upcoming legislative assembly election in his native state. He formulated the strategy for the party. However, no party managed to get a majority in the election. The media speculated that Singh might become the Chief Minister of Jammu and Kashmir as he had the support of Narendra Modi and Amit Shah and was popular amongst the Hindus of Jammu. The party negotiated with Jammu and Kashmir National Conference party in order to form a coalition government. However, talks fell flat when the National Conference rejected the demand of a Hindu chief minister for which Singh was a front runner.

== Political views ==
=== Jammu and Kashmir ===
Singh said that the Article 370 of the Constitution of India, which gave a special status to the state of Jammu and Kashmir was temporary in nature and quoted India's first prime minister Jawaharlal Nehru for the same. He alleged that Congress and National Conference parties had fooled the people of the state "in the name of Article 370". He further criticised former chief minister Sheikh Abdullah for misusing the article to lengthen the term of the assembly. In context of the aftermath of the revocation of the special status of Jammu and Kashmir, he said that "Human life more important than internet connectivity". At the India Today Conclave 2019 he stated that the next goal was "Retrieving PoK" and that this "does not mean military aggression". In 2023 Singh said retrieving Pakistan occupied Kashmir "is very much on the agenda of the government led by Prime Minister Modi and the BJP as a political party".

Singh has said on multiple occasions that there is no such thing as the "Kashmir issue" and that it is a "myth" created by political groups; "Jammu and Kashmir is a part of Indian Union very much like other States of UP, Bihar or Punjab". In 2019 in the parliament he stated that if there was any issue at all it was "PoK".

== See also ==
- First Modi Ministry
- Second Modi Ministry
- Third Modi ministry

Lok Sabha
Preceded by Lal Singh Chaudhary	Member of Parliament for Udhampur; 2014 – present	Incumbent
Political offices
Preceded by Jaipal Reddy	Minister of Science and Technology; 26 May 2014 – 9 November 2014; Minister of State with Independent Charge	Succeeded by Harsh Vardhan
Preceded by Jaipal Reddy	Minister of Earth Sciences; 26 May 2014 – 9 November 2014; Minister of State with Independent Charge	Succeeded by Harsh Vardhan
Preceded by V. K. Singh; Minister of State with Independent Charge	Minister of Development of North Eastern Region; 9 November 2014 - 7 July 2021; Minister of State with Independent Charge	Succeeded by G. Kishan Reddy
Preceded by Harsh Vardhan	Minister of Earth Sciences; 7 July 2021 - 18 May 2023; Minister of State with Independent Charge	Succeeded by Kiren Rijiju
Preceded by Harsh Vardhan	Minister of Science and Technology; 7 July 2021 – Present; Minister of State with Independent Charge	Incumbent
