= Raja Choudhury =

- Raja Choudhury
- Born: Ranjit Choudhury; 11 June 1964 (age 62); Ibadan, Nigeria
- Education: AA School of Architecture
- Occupations: Filmmaker, Architect, Spiritual Teacher and Speaker
- Spouse: Jagriti Chadha (2005 - )

Raja Choudhury (born Ranjit Choudhury, 11 June 1964) is a National Film Award (India) winning documentary film maker, architect, public speaker, spiritual teacher on The Shift Network, and designer of multimedia installations and events and Web sites, some of which have received Webby Awards.

== Early Career in Digital Media ==
In 1993 Choudhury, Mudimo Okondo, and Emma Westecott founded Zone UK, a digital design company in London. Choudhury designed the VID Zone Kiosk Network at Tower Records and HMV stores in London. The kiosk was described as "The Best Public Demo of Multimedia Ever" by Design Technology Magazine. In 1995 the team at Zone launched the UK's first CDROM Music & Lifestyle Magazine UnZip with IPC Magazines which was awarded a Milia D’Or at Mipcom in Cannes in 1996. Zone was the first company in the UK to introduce kiosk and the Internet into music stores, night clubs and university bars. In 1997 Zone installed multimedia kiosks in 10 London universities, providing the MeTV Network for students. Choudhury moved to New York City in 1998 and designed the FastTake Video Kiosk Network, the online launches of Softbank, NetValue and BT Conferencing, and became creative director for agencies Cohn & Wolfe and Converseon. In 2007 he designed Websites Webby Honorees in 2008: OurWeddingDay.com and CBCWorldwide.com. In 2008 he produced India's first multimedia broadband kiosk entertainment network for Coca-Cola called the Dilli Dil Se Network in time for the 2009 Indian Premier League offering videos, video chat, facts, results, games, social networking and mobile downloads. The touch-screen kiosks were available at 30 locations across New Delhi. Since 2009, Raja has continued to work in the digital space advising large brands and non-profit organizations including tGELF, Alchemist Group and The Shift Network.

== Documentary films ==
Choudhury's first documentary film as a co-producer and art director was "Desi: South Asians of New York" for PBS Channel Thirteen in 2000 with Glazer Creative in New York. He then started publishing a newsletter entitled Universal Quest with A.T. Mann. He went on to produce numerous videos for the American India Foundation, the Ramakrishna-Vivekananda Center and others. In 2006 he produced his first documentary film "Spirituality in the Modern World" which captured a dialogue between Ken Wilber and Traleg Kyabgon Rinpoche. The DVD was released in 2007.

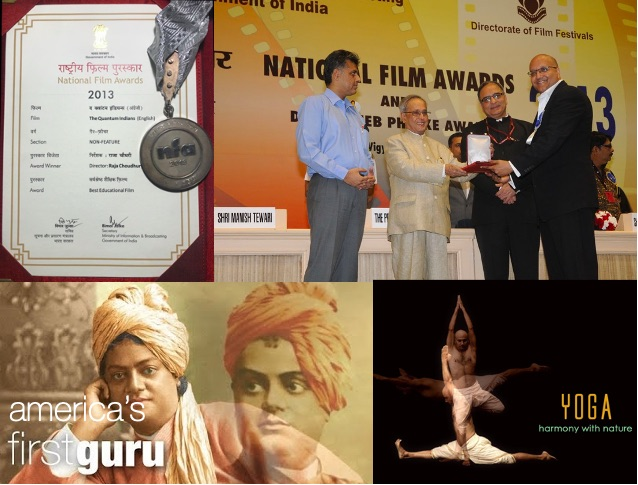
Raja Choudhury Films and Awards

In 2010 Raja produced his second documentary film "I Believe: Universal Values for a Global Society" on the beliefs of Karan Singh. The film was launched by India's Prime Minister Manmohan Singh in March 2011, and was shown on India's national public TV network Doordarshan. In 2011 he produced the film "The Modern Mystic" on the spiritual teacher Sri M of Madanapalle. The DVD was launched in Bangalore India in October 2011. Both films were selected for the Spirit Enlightened Film Festival at CultureUnplugged.com. In 2012 he produced "The 21st Century Indian" profiling S. M. Krishna, India's Minister of External Affairs. In August 2013 Choudhury launched the film The Quantum Indians about the great Indian scientists Satyendranath Bose, CV Raman and Meghnad Saha for the Public Service Broadcasting Trust of India (PSBT) and the Public Diplomacy Division of the Ministry of External Affairs of India. This film won the National Film Award for Best Educational/Motivational/Instructional Film of 2013 and also the prestigious Golden Beaver Award given by the Indian Department of Science and Technology, Vigyan Prasar, as the Best Public Science Film of 2013. He also produced 2 acclaimed films on Yoga Yoga: Aligning to the Source on the origins, mythology, practice, and history of Yoga was launched on 26 November 2013 and includes appearances by BKS Iyengar, Karan Singh and Devdutt Pattanaik and India's official film celebrating the International Day of Yoga entitled Yoga Harmony with Nature which was released on 21 June 2015.

In 2024, Raja completed the production of a film for Public Television in the US called America's First Guru, which tells the story of Swami Vivekananda and how his arrival in Chicago in 1893 led to a spiritual revolution in American culture, words, and consciousness. The film is presented by WTTW Chicago and distributed by NETA.

== Filmography ==
Year	Film/show	Role	Notes
2000	Desi: South Asians of New York PBS Doc	Coproducer/Art Director	First production on the South Asians of New York City; Culture Food, Politics, History.
2006	Spirituality in the Modern World: A Dialogue with Ken Wilber and Traleg Rinpoche	Producer and Director	(Documentary Film)
2011	I Believe: Universal Values for a Global Society	Producer and Director	Documentary Film on Dr. Karan Singh and his vision for India and Humanity. Launched by PM Manmohan Singh in 2012
2011	The Modern Mystic: Sri M of Madanapalle	Producer and Director	Documentary Film on spiritual teacher, educator, interfaith activist and beloved Guru to many, Sri M (Mumtaz Ali)
2012	The 21st Century Indian: Wisdom in Action S.M.Krishna	Producer and Director	Documentary Film on SM Krishna, the Chief Minister of Karnataka who was responsible for making Bangalore the Silicon Valley of India
2013	The Quantum Indians: Bose, Saha and Raman	Writer and Director	Documentary Film on the great Indian scientists Raman, Bose and Saha produced by PSBT and PD/XP of the MEA - winner of 2014 National Film Award for Best Educational Film of 2013 and winner of the Vigyan Prashar Golden Beaver Award for Best Science Film
2013	Yoga: Aligning to the Source	Writer and Director	Documentary Film on the essence and origins of Yoga produced by PSBT and PD/XP of the MEA
2015	Yoga: Harmony wIth Nature	Writer and Director	Documentary Film on the origins, history, practice and worldwide spread of Yoga in celebration of the UN's International Day of Yoga on 21 June 2015 - produced by the PD/XP Division of the Ministry of External Affairs - Premiering June 2015
2017	Devipuram: Guruji Amritananda	Writer and Director	Documentary Film on Guruji Amritananda, a nuclear physicist who became India's leading exponent of Sri Vidya and Goddess worship - produced by the Sri Vidya Trust. Premiered in 2017
2023	America's First Guru	Writer and Director	Documentary Film on Swami Vivekananda and the story of how Yoga and Hinduism first came to America with his arrival in 1893 at the World's Parliament of Religions. Premiering in the fall of 2023 on PBS with WTTW Chicago as the presenting station. Will be shown theatrically worldwide and on PBS in the US.

== Major Web and Multimedia Projects ==
Year	Project	Role	Details and Awards
1993-1997	VID Zone Kiosk Network, UK	Creative Director and Founder	UK based Music Video and Interactive Touch Screen Kiosk Network at Tower Records, HMV Stores, Night Clubs, London University Bars and other Retail Outlets across London UK. Described as the "Best public demo of Multimedia ever" by Design Technology Magazine
1995-1996	UnZip CD ROM Music Magazine, UK	Creative Director and CoFounder with IPC Magazines	Europe's first CDROM Multimedia Magazine on Music, Lifestyle and Branded entertainment. Winner of Milia D'Orat MipCOM Cannes 1996
1999	FastTake Video Kiosk Network, USA	Creative Director	Design of 300 touchscreen kiosk network for Video Retail across US market
2000	NetValue.com Launch	Creative Director	US Launch of leading Digital Metrics Company
2001	BTConferencing.com Launch	Creative Director	US Launch of BT's flagship online conferencing brand
2004	Softbank.com Redesign	Creative Director	Redesign of Global Bank Sofbank's online presence
2005-2006	Community Church of New York	Creative Director and Lead Strategist	Rebranding and redefining of vision for leading New York Unitarian Church and Community
2006-2008	OurWeddingDay.com	Creative Director	2008 Webby Honoree Award Winner
2007	CBCWorldwide.com	Creative Director	2008 Webby Honoree Award Winner for Coldwell Banker Commercial
2009	Coca-Cola Dilli-Dil Se Kiosk Network, India	Creative Director	Online touch screen multimedia network at 30 locations across New Delhi and Website celebrating Coca-Cola's sponsorship of the Delhi Daredevils in the IPL
2011-2012	AlchemistGroup.com, India	Creative Director	Redesign of online presence of US$2 Billion Indian conglomerate
2012-2015	tGELF.org, India	Creative Director	Online and Video launch of The Global Education and Leadership Foundation
2015	TheShiftNetwork.com, US	Creative Director	Redesign of one of US' largest Conscious Media company's online presence
