= An Examined Life =

2019 book by Karan Singh

An Examined Life: Essays and Reflections by Karan Singh
- Editor: Raghav Verma
- Author: Karan Singh
- Language: English
- Publisher: HarperCollins
- Publication date: 2019-05-20
- Publication place: India
- ISBN: 978-9-353-57023-1

An Examined Life: Essays and Reflections by Karan Singh is a collection of life writings by Karan Singh, the erstwhile prince and son of Maharaja Hari Singh of Dogra dynasty of royal house of Jammu and Kashmir. The book is a collection of 70 years of his writings from 1948 to 2018, edited by Raghav Verma. In writing the introduction to the book, Shashi Tharoor calls Karan Singh "the best President India never had". The book also contains a foreword by former Prime Minister of India Manmohan Singh. An Examined Life was launched in India by HarperCollins on May 20, 2019, at Imperial Hotel, New Delhi and speaking at the launch of the book, Dr Manmohan Singh said “His life is a great debt on us, and will long remain a great example for the future generations of our nation.”

== Reception ==
Indian social activist and writer Harsh Mander, reviewing the book in The Indian Express, calls out Karan singh to not address the "profound critique of Hinduism by Ambedkar" and points out that the book is "silent about the massacre of Muslims in Jammu in 1947, the traumatic expulsion of Kashmiri Pandits from the Valley, and decades of militancy."

"He records his conviction that what he did was for the “national good”, and that “all the risks and dangers were worth taking if it served the country”. But history would require much more searching self-critical introspection with hindsight, of unhealed wounds left by these momentous political decisions, destined to cast their long shadows for decades."

Historian Harbans Singh has called the book "a must read".
