= Ajatshatru Singh =

Indian politician

Minister of Tourism, Youth Services & Sports, Parks and Gardens, Science & Technology and Transport & Information
- In office 1996–2002
- Chief Minister: Farooq Abdullah

Member of Jammu and Kashmir Legislative Council
- In office 2015–2019

Member of Jammu and Kashmir Legislative Assembly
- In office 1996–2002
- Constituency: Nagrota

Personal details
- Born: 6 February 1966 (age 60) Jammu, India
- Party: Bharatiya Janata Party (since 2014)
- Other political affiliations: Jammu & Kashmir National Conference (until 2014)
- Parent(s): Karan Singh and Yasho Rajya Lakshmi
- Relatives: Dogra dynasty Vikramaditya Singh (Brother)
- Occupation: Politician

Ajatshatru Singh (born 6 February 1966) is an Indian politician and a member of the Bharatiya Janata Party. He is a former member of Jammu and Kashmir Legislative Council in the Government of Jammu and Kashmir. He was a member of the Jammu & Kashmir National Conference and was minister of state with portfolios of Tourism, Youth Services & Sports, Parks and Gardens, Science & Technology and Transport & Information in Farooq Abdullah's government from 1996 to 2002. He was also Member of Legislative Assembly from Nagrota constituency from 1996 to 2002.

He is a younger brother of senior Congress leader Vikramaditya Singh and son of former Sadr-e-Riyasat Karan Singh and Yasho Rajya Lakshmi, granddaughter of the last Rana Prime Minister of Nepal, Mohan Shumsher Jang Bahadur Rana. He is also Trustee of J&K Dharmarth Trust which was founded by Maharaja Gulab Singh. His elder brother Vikramaditya Singh was a member of the Indian National Congress.

In November 2014, he joined the Bharatiya Janata Party in presence of party's President Amit Shah.

== Electoral performance ==
Election	Constituency	Party	Result	Votes %	Opposition Candidate	Opposition Party	Opposition vote %	Ref
2002	Nagrota, Jammu and Kashmir	JKNC	Lost	26.65%	Jugal Kishore Sharma	BJP	26.82%	
1996	Nagrota, Jammu and Kashmir	JKNC	Won	28.32%	Dhan Raj Bargotra	JD	20.68%	
