= Maroof Raza =

Indian soldier and journalist (1959–2026)

Major (Retd.) Maroof Raza (7 May 1959 – 26 February 2026)
- Born: 7 May 1959
- Died: 26 February 2026 (aged 66); Gurugram, India
- Burial place: New Delhi, India
- Education: Mayo_College; St. Stephen's College, Delhi; Indian Military Academy; King's College, London; Cambridge University.
- Military career
- Allegiance: India
- Branch: Indian Army
- Service years: 1980–1994
- Rank: Major
- Unit: The Grenadiers

Maroof Raza (7 May 1959 – 26 February 2026) was an Indian Army officer with experience in counter-insurgency operations. He had more than 20 years of experience as a mentor, anchor, correspondent, lecturer, writer and a commentator on issues of National Security and Strategic Affairs.

== Education ==
Raza was educated at Mayo College, Ajmer and subsequently graduated with in History from St. Stephen's College, Delhi, had an M.A. in War Studies from King's College, London, and an M.Phil in International Relations from Cambridge University.

== Career ==
=== Armed forces ===
Raza served in the Indian Army from 1980 to 1994. He served in the Grenadiers and the Mechanised Infantry Regiment. Later he was appointed as an instructor at the Indian Military Academy.

=== Fellowship ===
In 1994, he was awarded the Times of India Fellowship. He held Visiting Fellowships at the Centre for Policy Research, Delhi, at the Henry L. Stimson Centre, Washington and at the War Studies Department of King's College, London. Between 1998 and 2007, He was a visiting professor at Middlesex University and its Regional Director (for South Asia). He continued to lecture extensively in India and abroad on India's Security Concerns, until his death.

=== Anchor ===
Raza anchored and presented many TV series showcasing Indian Defence and National security themes over two decades. Some of the popular multi episode TV series shows he has anchored include "Line of Duty", "Latitude", "India Risk Report" and "The Defenders".

For Times Now, he anchored a 20-part series on the Indian armed forces, titled Line of Duty. An episode from this series, on the Siachen Glacier won an Award in the military documentary section at the Film Festival in Rome in 2005. This TV series has entered the Limca Book of Records as India's first military reality show.

For Times Now, he anchored a strategic affairs show titled "Latitude" between the years 2013 and 2023.

For ET Now, he anchored a bi-weekly show titled "India Risk Report" in partnership with IIRIS Consulting.

For Sansad TV, he anchored the series "The Defenders", between 2021 and 2023. The series, over 80 episodes, showcased the strength of the Indian military, its formations and operations to the common citizen.

=== Strategic Affairs Commentator ===
Raza appeared on almost all of India's leading television channels as an expert on military and security matters and on BBC's World Service radio programmes. He was the Strategic Affairs Editorial Adviser to Times Now and also the Editor-at-Large of FAUJI INDIA Magazine. He was the Mentor of Security Watch India.

=== Columnist ===
His articles were published regularly in leading newspapers of India. He was a consultant and strategic affairs expert on Times Now. Apart from his appearances on news debates, he published and wrote for Salute magazine

=== Advisor ===
Raza also acted on the Board of Advisers – Strategic Risk and Global Geo-Political Experts with IIRIS Consulting..

=== Actor ===
Maroof had a guest role in 2014 Bollywood film Holiday: A Soldier Is Never Off Duty.

== Writing ==
Raza authored and edited many books. Low-Intensity Conflicts: The new dimension to India’s military commitments and Wars and no Peace over Kashmir. He edited a book titled Generals and Governments in India and Pakistan. As the General Editor of Military Affairs series of Har Anand Publications, from 2001, he edited twelve volumes. Most recently, he edited a book on Indian terrorism challenges titled Confronting Terrorism (Penguin Books, India).

- Low Intensity Conflicts: The new dimension to India’s military commitments by Maroof Raza (Kartikeya Publications, 1995) ISBN 9788185823089
- Wars and No Peace Over Kashmir: An Evolutionary Assessment of Indo-Pak Relations by Maroof Raza (Spantech & Lancer, 1996) ISBN 978-1897829165
- Confronting Terrorism by Maroof Raza (as Editor) (Penguin India, 2009) ISBN 9780670083695
- Generals and Governments in India & Pakistan by Maroof Raza (as Editor), (Har-Anand Publications, 2021) ISBN 978-9391504335
- Kashmir's Untold Story by Iqbal Chand Malhotra and Maroof Raza(Bloomsbury Publishing, 2021) ISBN 978-9390358625
- Contested Lands: India, China and the Boundary Dispute by Maroof Raza (Westland Non-Fiction, 2021) ISBN 978-9357768412
- Shourya Gatha: Bharat Ke Veer Senani (in Hindi) by Lt. Col. Sheodan Singh and Maroof Raza (Eka publishing, 2021) ISBN 978-9390679751
- Essays on Military Affairs by Maroof Raza (Har-Anand Publications, 2024) ISBN 978-8119798803

== Awards ==
- ENBA 2020: "Best in-depth series" award: Raza's series "Tales of Valour" with Times Network.

== Death ==
Raza died from cancer in Gurugram, on 26 February 2026, at the age of 66.
