= Malhori =

- Village
- Location in Jammu and Kashmir, India Malhori (India)
- Coordinates: 32.757°N 74.908°E
- Country: India
- Union Territory: Jammu and Kashmir
- District: Jammu

Population (2011)
  - Total: 362

Languages
  - Spoken: Dogri, Hindi
- Time zone: UTC+5:30 (IST)

Malhori is a village and municipality in Jammu district of the Indian union territory of Jammu and Kashmir.
