= Devyani Singh Rana =

Indian politician

Devyani Rana
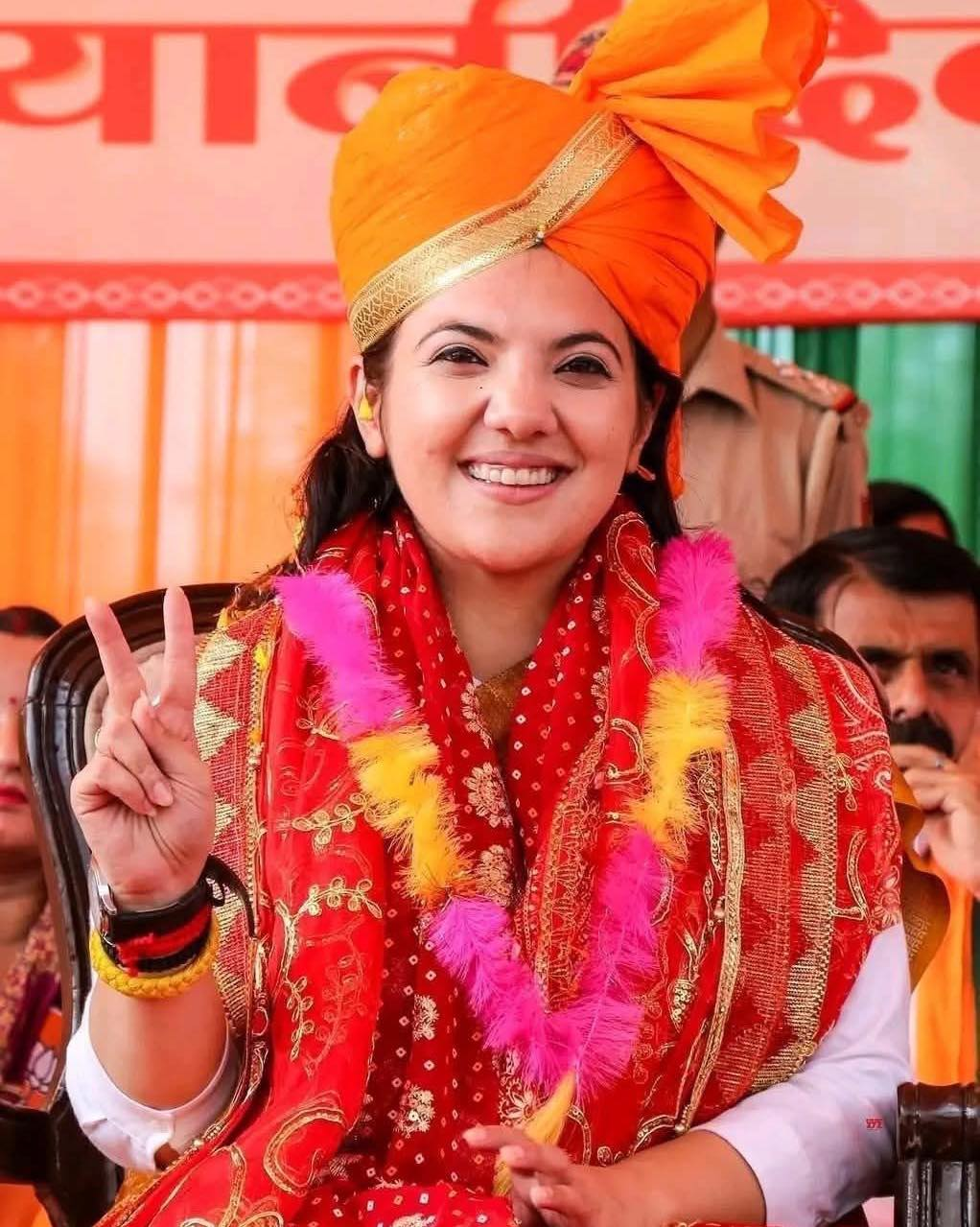
- Devyani Rana at BJP nomination rally in Nagrota, 2024

Member of Jammu and Kashmir Legislative Assembly
- Incumbent
- Assumed office 14 November 2025
- Preceded by: Devender Singh Rana
- Constituency: Nagrota

Personal details
- Party: Bharatiya Janata Party
- Relations: Jitendra Singh (Paternal Uncle)
- Parent: Devender Singh Rana (father)
- Education: UCLA (BA)

Devyani Rana is an Indian politician from Jammu and Kashmir, the incumbent member of the Jammu and Kashmir Legislative Assembly from Nagrota Assembly constituency seat.

== Political career ==
She was fielded by the Bharatiya Janata Party as its candidate for the Nagrota by-election in 2025 following the demise of her father, former four time legislator Devender Singh Rana.

She won the election with 42,350 votes, defeating her nearest rival by a margin of 24,647 votes.

Rana was the youngest among the candidates contesting the Nagrota bypoll.

She received praise across party lines for her speech during a Jammu and Kashmir Assembly session, where she focused on budgetary issues including disaster management, education, and infrastructure.

Rana has been involved in initiatives promoting women empowerment and local entrepreneurship. In 2025, she supported women-led self-help group initiatives in Nagrota, including the launch of products such as "Gau Shakti" and "Pooja Saathi" dhoop cones.

In March 2026, on the occasion of International Women’s Day, she distributed Jammu & Kashmir Bank loan sanction letters amounting to ₹70 lakh to women beneficiaries under the Mission Yuva initiative to support entrepreneurship and self-employment.

Rana has also been involved in initiatives related to rural development and agriculture. In March 2026, she inaugurated the office of the Mathwar Farmer Producer Organisation (FPO) in Nagrota and launched an awareness programme on cooperative farming and farmer welfare.

In 2026, she launched a youth-centric training and employment drive in Nagrota focused on the hospitality sector.

== Early life and education ==
Rana completed her schooling in Jammu, where she studied Accounting, Economics, Business Studies and Mathematics. She later graduated from the University of California, Los Angeles (UCLA), majoring in economics (with a concentration in Econometrics) with a minor in film, television and digital media with Honours courses. She also took her senior year courses as an exchange scholar at the London School of Economics.

Prior to entering politics, she was recognised among awardees at the FICCI FLO Jammu, Kashmir and Ladakh ‘Trailblazers’ event in 2024.

== Personal life ==
Rana is the daughter of stalwart J&K politician Devender Singh Rana.
