= Nagrota, Jammu and Kashmir Assembly constituency =

Constituency of the Jammu and Kashmir legislative assembly in India

Coordinates: 32.80°N 74.91°E

Nagrota
- Constituency No. 77 for the Jammu and Kashmir Legislative Assembly

Constituency details
- Country: India
- State: Jammu and Kashmir
- District: Jammu
- Lok Sabha constituency: Jammu
- Established: 1996

Member of Legislative Assembly
- Incumbent Devyani Singh Rana
- Party: Bharatiya Janata Party
- Elected year: 2025

Nagrota Assembly constituency is one of the 90 constituencies in the Jammu and Kashmir Legislative Assembly of Jammu and Kashmir a north state of India. Nagrota is also part of Jammu Lok Sabha constituency.

== Members of the Legislative Assembly ==
Election	Member	Party
1996	Ajatshatru Singh	Jammu & Kashmir National Conference
2002	Jugal Kishore Sharma	Bharatiya Janata Party
2008	Jugal Kishore Sharma	Bharatiya Janata Party
2014	Devender Singh Rana	Jammu & Kashmir National Conference
2024	Devender Singh Rana	Bharatiya Janata Party
2025^	Devyani Singh Rana	Bharatiya Janata Party

★by election

== Election results ==
=== 2025 by-election ===
Jammu and Kashmir Legislative Assembly by-election, 2025: Nagrota
Party	Candidate	Votes	%	±%
BJP	Devyani Singh Rana	42,350	57.36	▼7.58
JKNPP	Harsh Dev Singh	17,703	23.98	New entry
JKNC	Shamim Begum	10,872	14.73	▼9.08
AAP	Joginder Singh	359	0.49	New entry
NOTA	None of the Above	349	0.47	▲0.09
Majority		24,647	33.38	▼7.75
Turnout		73,833	75.08	▼2.43
BJP hold		Swing	▼7.58	

=== Assembly Election 2024 ===
2024 Jammu and Kashmir Legislative Assembly election : Nagrota
Party	Candidate	Votes	%	±%
BJP	Devender Singh Rana	48,113	64.94	▲32.59
JKNC	Joginder Singh	17,641	23.81	▼15.22
INC	Balbir Singh	5,979	8.07	▲0.07
Independent	Jaswant Singh	809	1.09	New
BSP	Shak Mohammed	791	1.07	▼9.52
NOTA	None of the Above	285	0.38	▼0.59
Margin of victory		30,472	41.13	▲34.46
Turnout		74,083	77.51	▼5.70
Registered electors		95,573		▲31.09
BJP gain from JKNC		Swing	▲25.92	

=== Assembly Election 2014 ===
2014 Jammu and Kashmir Legislative Assembly election : Nagrota
Party	Candidate	Votes	%	±%
JKNC	Devender Singh Rana	23,678	39.03	▲19.58
BJP	Nand Kishore	19,630	32.35	▲9.60
BSP	Rakesh Wazir	6,422	10.58	▲2.35
INC	Shiv Dev Singh	4,853	8.00	▲2.34
JKPDP	Ch. Hussain Ali Waffa	4,049	6.67	▲1.65
Independent	Nazakat Ali Khatana	616	1.02	New
NOTA	None of the Above	594	0.98	New
Margin of victory		4,048	6.67	▲3.36
Turnout		60,671	83.22	▲3.89
Registered electors		72,907		▲18.13
JKNC gain from BJP		Swing	▲16.27	

=== Assembly Election 2008 ===
2008 Jammu and Kashmir Legislative Assembly election : Nagrota
Party	Candidate	Votes	%	±%
BJP	Jugal Kishore Sharma	11,141	22.76	▼4.06
JKNC	M. K. Ajat Shatru	9,521	19.45	▼7.20
Independent	Shiv Dev Singh	7,817	15.97	New
BSP	Najibullah	4,030	8.23	▼7.78
INC	Abdul Hamid	2,769	5.66	▼15.43
Independent	Balbir Singh Manhas	2,633	5.38	New
JKPDP	Mohammad Rashid	2,460	5.02	New
Margin of victory		1,620	3.31	▲3.14
Turnout		48,958	79.33	▲15.50
Registered electors		61,715		▼0.84
BJP hold		Swing	▼4.06	

=== Assembly Election 2002 ===
2002 Jammu and Kashmir Legislative Assembly election : Nagrota
Party	Candidate	Votes	%	±%
BJP	Jugal Kishore Sharma	10,653	26.82	▲16.60
JKNC	Ajatshatru Singh	10,586	26.65	▼1.67
INC	Abdul Hamid	8,376	21.09	▲5.92
BSP	Hans Raj	6,362	16.02	▲0.80
SS	Yesh Paul Gupta	776	1.95	New
Independent	Rajinder Singh	766	1.93	New
JKNPP	Rajinder Singh	703	1.77	New
Margin of victory		67	0.17	▼7.47
Turnout		39,723	63.85	▲1.11
Registered electors		62,238		▲40.82
BJP gain from JKNC		Swing	▼1.50	

=== Assembly Election 1996 ===
1996 Jammu and Kashmir Legislative Assembly election : Nagrota
Party	Candidate	Votes	%	±%
JKNC	Ajatshatru Singh	7,849	28.32	New
JD	Dhan Raj Bargotra	5,731	20.68	New
BSP	Hans Raj	4,217	15.22	New
INC	Shivdev Singh	4,204	15.17	New
BJP	Sohan Lal	2,833	10.22	New
Independent	Abdul Rasheed	1,627	5.87	New
Independent	Krishan Singh	448	1.62	New
Margin of victory		2,118	7.64	
Turnout		27,716	64.56	
Registered electors		44,196		
JKNC win (new seat)				

== See also ==
- Nagrota
- List of constituencies of Jammu and Kashmir Legislative Assembly
