= Sansad TV =

Indian television channel

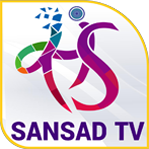
- Logo used since 2021
- Country: India
- Broadcast area: Worldwide
- Headquarters: 23, Mahadev Road, New Delhi, Delhi, India

Programming
- Languages: Hindi, English
- Picture format: 1080i HDTV

Ownership
- Owner: Government of India
- Key people: Amit Khare, IAS (Retd.) (CEO)

History
- Founded: March 2021; 5 years ago
- Launched: 15 September 2021; 4 years ago
- Replaced: Lok Sabha TV; Rajya Sabha TV

Links
- Webcast: https://webcast.gov.in/
- Website: sansadtv.nic.in

Availability

Streaming media
- Waves: Sansad TV 1 HD Sansad TV 2 HD

Sansad TV is an Indian government television channel, which broadcasts the proceedings of the two Houses of Indian Parliament (Bharatiya Sansad) and other public affairs programming. It was formed in March 2021 by amalgamating the existing house channels, Lok Sabha TV and the Rajya Sabha TV, although separate satellite channels are broadcast for each House.

Provisionally, the channel will have about 35 themes on which programmes will be aired, and the programmes will be similar, but in two languages: Hindi and English. The channel was launched by the Prime Minister of India Narendra Modi, Vice President of India Venkaiah Naidu and Speaker of Lok Sabha Om Birla on 15 September 2021. The TV Channel has experts from diverse fields as guest anchors for some flagship programmes and include Bibek Debroy, Karan Singh, Amitabh Kant, Shashi Tharoor, Vikas Swarup, Priyanka Chaturvedi, Hemant Batra, Maroof Raza and Sanjeev Sanyal.

== History ==
It was formed in the year 2021. "During the intersession period and beyond the working hours of Parliament, both will telecast common content to a large extent. The LSTV platform would telecast programmes in Hindi, while RSTV would do so in English. The two language variants, it was felt, enables better branding and increased viewership", a top official said. "The attempt is to go beyond the proceedings of the Houses and show the functioning of Parliament and parliamentarians when the House is not in session."

== See also ==
- Lists of television channels in India
