= Madhavrao Scindia =

Indian politician and last titular Maharaja of Gwalior (1945–2001)

Madhavrao J. Scindia
- The People's Maharaja
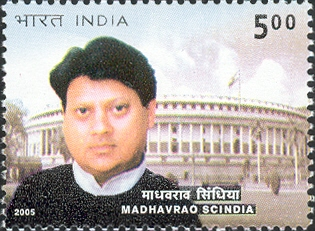
- Madhavrao II on a 2005 stamp of India
- In office 15 March 1971 – 31 December 1984
- Preceded by: Acharya Kripalani
- Succeeded by: Mahendra Singh Kalukheda
- Constituency: Guna, Madhya Pradesh
- In office 31 December 1984 – 10 October 1999
- Preceded by: Narayan Shejwalkar
- Succeeded by: Jaibhan Singh Pavaiya
- Constituency: Gwalior, Madhya Pradesh

Union Minister of State (Independent Charge) for Railways
- In office 22 October 1986 – 1 December 1989
- Prime Minister: Rajiv Gandhi
- Preceded by: Mohsina Kidwai
- Succeeded by: George Fernandes

Union Minister of Civil Aviation
- In office 1991–1993
- Prime Minister: P. V. Narasimha Rao
- Preceded by: Harmohan Dhawan
- Succeeded by: Ghulam Nabi Azad

Union Minister of Tourism
- In office 1991–1993
- Prime Minister: P. V. Narasimha Rao
- Preceded by: Devi Lal
- Succeeded by: Ghulam Nabi Azad

Union Minister of Human Resource Development
- In office 1995–1996
- Prime Minister: P. V. Narasimha Rao
- Preceded by: P. V. Narasimha Rao
- Succeeded by: P. V. Narasimha Rao

Member of Parliament, Lok Sabha
- In office 10 October 1999 – 30 September 2001
- Preceded by: Vijaya Raje Scindia
- Succeeded by: Jyotiraditya M. Scindia
- Constituency: Guna, Madhya Pradesh

Personal details
- Born: 10 March 1945 Bombay, Bombay Province, British India (present day Mumbai, Maharashtra, India)
- Died: 30 September 2001 (aged 56) Mainpuri, Uttar Pradesh, India
- Party: Indian National Congress (1977-1996), (1998-2001)
- Other political affiliations: Madhya Pradesh Vikas Congress (1996-1998); Bharatiya Jana Sangh (1971–1977)
- Spouse: Madhavi Raje Sahib Scindia (m. 1966)
- Relations: See Scindia Dynasty
- Children: Chitrangada Singh (daughter); Jyotiraditya M. Scindia (son)
- Occupation: Politician

Madhavrao Jiwajirao Scindia or Madhavrao II (10 March 1945 – 30 September 2001) was an Indian politician, minister in the Government of India. (1945–2001) and scion of the former ruling Scindia dynasty of Gwalior. He was popularly and affectionately referred to as the "Prince Charming of Indian politics" and the "People's Maharaja" due to his aristocratic lineage, charismatic demeanor, youthful image, and immense mass appeal. He was viewed as a potential future prime ministerial candidate before the 1999 Lok Sabha elections in the aftermath of the controversy over Sonia Gandhi's foreign origin.

During his tenure the Indian Railways saw its golden period. He computerized the railway system in the late 1980s and introduced first Shatabdi Express between New Delhi to Gwalior which run at 160 km/h for the first time.

Scindia was the son of Jiwajirao Scindia, the last ruling Maharaja of the erstwhile Gwalior State. Upon the death of his father in 1961, and under terms agreed to during the political integration of India, Scindia succeeded to a privy purse, certain privileges, and the use of the title "Maharaja of Gwalior," which lasted until 1971, whereupon all were abolished by the 26th Amendment to the Constitution of India.

== Early life ==
Scindia was born to the last ruling Maharaja of Gwalior, Jiwajirao Scindia and his mother was Rajmata Vijay Raje Scindia. He married Madhavi Raje Scindia, a daughter of army general of Madhesh Province, Nepal, and a great-granddaughter of Prime Minister of Nepal and Maharaja of Kaski and Lamjung, Juddha Shamsher Jang Bahadur Rana, a patrilineal descendant of Sardar Ramakrishna Kunwar of Gorkha. They had two children, a daughter, Chitrangada Singh (born 1967), a son Jyotiraditya Scindia (born 1971).

Scindia underwent his schooling in Scindia School, Gwalior and thereafter went for higher studies in Winchester College and at New College, Oxford.

On his return from the UK, Scindia followed the political tradition set by his mother Vijaya Raje Scindia by joining politics. He was elected to the Lok Sabha in 1971 from the Guna constituency on a Bharatiya Jana Sangh ticket.

Madhavrao Scindia contested and won nine Lok Sabha elections in his political career. He maintained an undefeated electoral record from his parliamentary debut in 1971 until his death in 2001, spanning consecutive terms representing the Guna and Gwalior constituencies in Madhya Pradesh. The most notable and iconic election he won was against Atal Bihari Vajapyee in 1984 general elections from Gwalior Lok Sabha seat wherein he defeated Atal Bihair Vajpayee with more than 2 lakhs votes.

== Career ==
=== Electoral victories ===
He won for the first time from Guna constituency at the age of 26. He contested the election on the ticket of Bharatiya Jana Sangh (the precursor of the present day Bharatiya Janata Party), which his family had long patronised. When the Emergency, he fled the country into self-imposed exile in the United Kingdom.

After he returned to India, he resigned from the Bharatiya Jana Sangh. He contested from Guna constituency as an independent candidate and won the seat a second time in spite of the wave in favour of the Janata Party.

In the 1980 election, he switched allegiance to the Indian National Congress and won from Guna a third time. In 1984, he was nominated as the Congress party's candidate from Gwalior in a last-minute manoeuvre to defeat the Bharatiya Janta Party's Atal Bihari Vajpayee, and won by a massive margin. After that Scindia contested from either Gwalior or Guna and won on each occasion.

=== Ministerial appointments ===
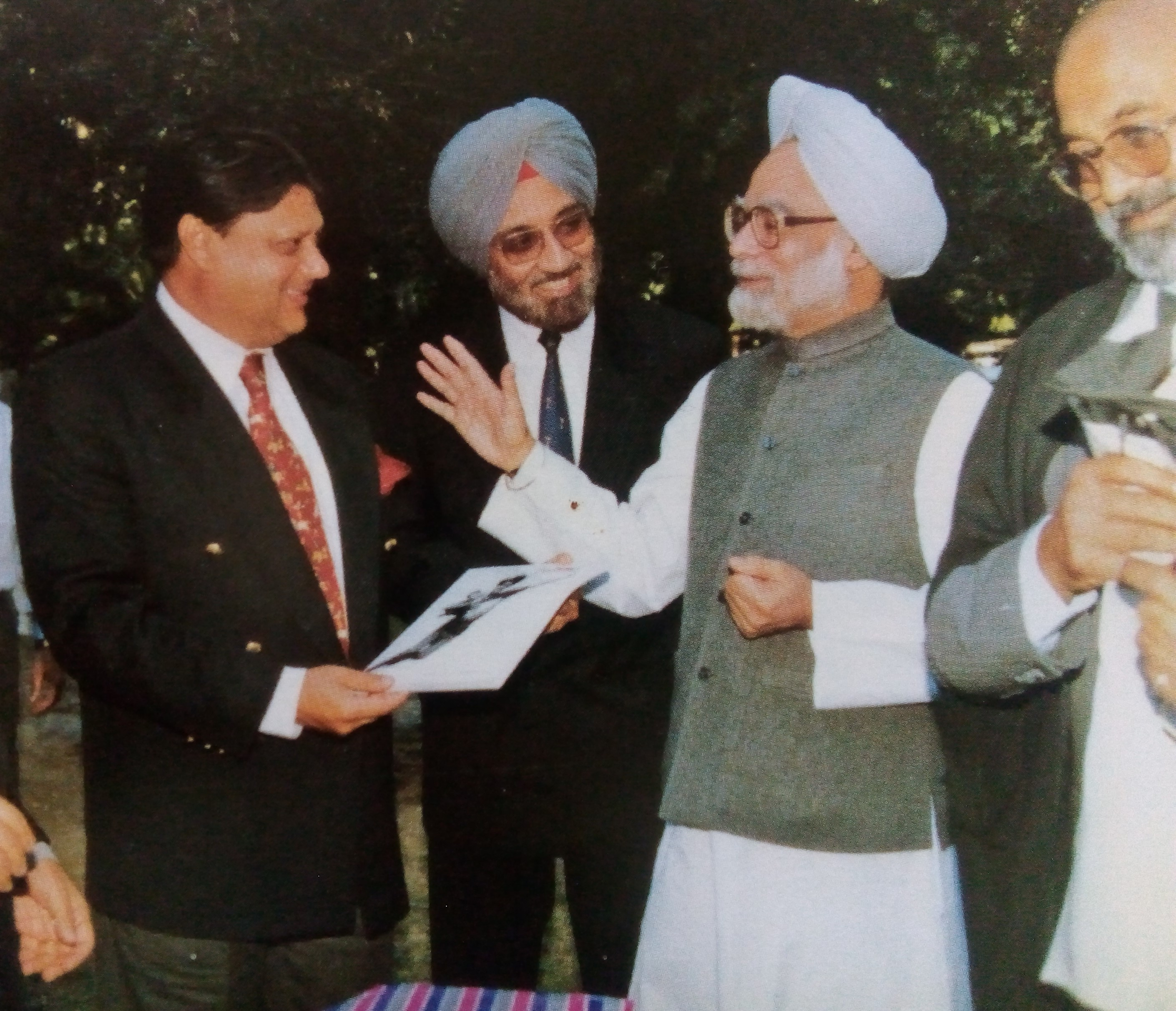
Scindia (left) with Manmohan Singh (right) and headmaster Shomie Das at the Doon School, Dehradun, India.

The 1984 election brought Scindia his first experience as a minister. He made his mark as an excellent administrator during his stint as Railways Minister (22 October 1986 – 1 December 1989) in the Rajiv Gandhi Ministry that period is remembered as the golden period of Railways.

Prime Minister P. V. Narasimha Rao made him Minister for Civil Aviation. He faced a turbulent period of agitation by the staff of the domestic carrier, Indian Airlines, and as part of a strategy of disciplining the workforce, he leased a number of aircraft from Russia. Early in 1992 one of these aircraft crashed, though without any loss of life, and Scindia promptly submitted his resignation. Although not known to be too finicky about such notions as ministerial accountability, the prime minister accepted his resignation. Scindia was later reinducted into the Cabinet in 1995 as Minister for Human Resource Development. Scindia is also credited with setting up the Indian Institute of Information Technology and Management (IIITM) at Gwalior as an institution of repute, which got renamed after Atal Bihari Vajpayee as ABV-IIITM.

=== Opposition years ===
After the defeat of the Indian National Congress in the 1989 Indian general election, Scindia became a prominent member of the opposition. In 1990, after the fall of the V. P. Singh government, the Congress provided external support to the Samajwadi Janata Party (Rashtriya) government of Chandra Shekhar. Scindia was appointed president of the Board of Control for Cricket in India (BCCI), a post he held until his 3-year term expired in 1993.

=== Rebellion and return ===
In 1996, he left the Congress party after being accused of bribery by prime minister PV Narasimha Rao. He founded the Madhya Pradesh Vikas Congress (MPVC), and along with Arjun Singh and other Congress dissidents formed the United Front government at the Centre. Scindia himself opted to stay out of the cabinet. In 1998, just before the Lok Sabha elections he merged the MPVC into the Congress party. He won the 1998 Lok Sabha election from Guna.

== Death ==
Madhavrao Scindia died at the age of 56, in a plane crash in Motta village, which is on the outskirts of Mainpuri district of Uttar Pradesh, on 30 September 2001. The plane caught fire when it was above Bhainsrauli village. Being viewed as a future prime ministerial candidate before the 1999 Lok Sabha elections in the aftermath of the controversy over Sonia Gandhi's foreign origin, he was on his way to address a rally in Kanpur.

All eight people on board the private plane (Beechcraft King Air C90) died in the crash. This included his personal secretary Rupinder Singh, journalists Sanjeev Sinha (The Indian Express), Anju Sharma (The Hindustan Times), Gopal Bisht, Ranjan Jha (Aaj Tak), pilot Ray Gautam and co-pilot Ritu Malik. The bodies were charred beyond recognition and taken by road to Agra, from where a special Indian Air Force aircraft, sent by Prime Minister Atal Bihari Vajpayee, brought the remains to New Delhi. The remains of Madhavrao Scindia were identified by his family, with the Goddess Durga locket that he always used to wear.

The autopsies and other legal formalities were conducted and completed respectively at the All India Institute of Medical Sciences, New Delhi by Professor T. D. Dogra. His son Jyotiraditya M. Scindia was symbolically appointed the head of the family.

== Ancestry ==
- Reference :

Ancestors of Madhavrao Scindia

8. Jayajirao, Maharaja of Gwalior (1843–1886)
4. Madhavrao II, Maharaja of Gwalior (1876–1925)
9. Sakhyabai Raje, Maharani Regent of Gwalior (1862–1919)
2. Jivajirao, Maharaja of Gwalior (1916–1961)
10. Rao Rana Satrojirao Vithalrao Rane, Sar Desai of Sankli
5. Gajrabai Raje, Maharani Regent of Gwalior (d. 1943)
1. Madhavrao III, Maharaja of Gwalior
12. Thakur Theobaran Singh of Gangini,
6. Thakur Mahendra Singh of Sagar (1892–?)
3. Lekha Divyeshwari Devi (Vijaya Raje Scindia), Maharani of Gwalior (1919–2001)
14. General HH Raja Khadga Shamsher Jang Bahadur Rana(1861–1921)
7. Thakurani Chuda Devashwari Devi (c. 1900–1919)
15. Sri Rani Dhankumari Rajya Lakshmi

Madhavrao Scindia Scindia Dynasty Born: 10 March 1945 Died: 2 October 2001
Preceded by Jivaji Rao Scindia	— TITULAR — Maharaja of Gwalior; 1961–1971; Reason for succession failure: Monarchy abolished in 1948, and title, privileges, and privy purses abolished in 1971	Succeeded by Jyotiraditya Scindia

== Bibliography ==
- Sanghvi, Vir; Bhandare, Namita (2009). Madhavrao Scindia: A life. Penguin Books. ISBN 978-0-670-08254-4.
