= Lok Sabha TV =

Indian legislative television channel

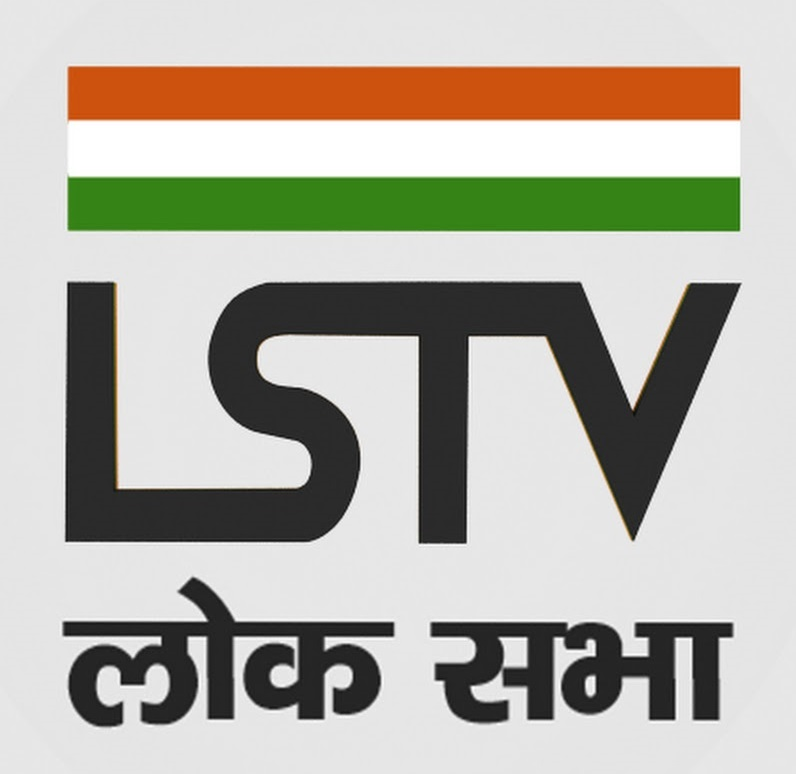
- Country: India
- Broadcast area: Worldwide
- Headquarters: 23, Mahadev Road, Behind Akashvani Bhawan, New Delhi, Delhi, India

Programming
- Language(s): Hindi and English
- Picture format: 16:9 (576i, SDTV)

Ownership
- Owner: Lok Sabha
- Sister channels: Rajya Sabha TV

History
- Launched: 1989 as Doordarshan; Incorporated as Lok Sabha TV in 2004
- Replaced by: Sansad TV
- Former names: Doordarshan Lok Sabha (DD Lok Sabha) (1989–2004)

Links
- Website: loksabhatv.nic.in

Availability

Streaming media
- Available free to all internet users: https://webcast.gov.in/lstvlive/

Lok Sabha TV was an Indian public cable television network channel that offered coverage of central government proceedings and other public affairs programming. Its remit was to make accessible to all the work of the parliamentary and legislative bodies of India. The channel broadcast live and recorded coverage of the Lok Sabha (lower house of Parliament) while Rajya Sabha TV covered the sessions of the Rajya Sabha (upper house of Parliament).

In 2021, Lok Sabha TV merged with Rajya Sabha TV to form Sansad TV.

== History ==
Select Parliamentary proceedings have been telecast in India since 1989, when the President's address to Parliament was shown on live television. After 1994 the Question Hours of both Houses were broadcast live on alternate weeks on both satellite television and All India Radio. The broadcasts were scheduled to ensure that on a given week proceedings in both Houses were aired, one on TV and the other on radio.

In 2006, DD Lok Sabha was replaced by Lok Sabha TV (LSTV), a 24-hour TV channel broadcasting in Hindi and English, which is owned and operated entirely by the Lok Sabha itself, broadcasting live the proceedings of the Lok Sabha and also various cultural and educational programs and panel discussions, when the Lok Sabha is not in session

Lok Sabha TV is a must-carry channel in India, and all television service providers (Direct to Home as well as cable TV providers) must carry this channel, as mandated in the advisory issued by the Indian government in 2015 and still in force.

Currently Lok Sabha TV is headed by Aashish Joshi, Chief Executive & Editor-in-Chief a well known Journalist and Media/Broadcast professional, and the current editor of the national channel. The Channel's programming is headed by Sumit Singh (Executive Director-Programmes), a journalist and media professional who also anchors a popular show called 'Know Your MP' and Technical headed by Abhishek Agrawal, Senior Technical Manager.

== Dedicated Parliamentary Channels ==
With efforts of the Lok Sabha and Prasar Bharati, in 2004 two dedicated satellite channels were set up to telecast live the proceedings of both Houses of Parliament. In July 2006, DD Lok Sabha was replaced by Lok Sabha Television, which is owned and operated by the Lok Sabha itself. Lok Sabha Television also airs other national ceremonies, such as the Oath-taking ceremony of the President of India, conferring of awards to Parliamentarians, and addresses by foreign dignitaries. Private television channels are allowed to use these feeds subject to payment and conditions laid down by the Lok Sabha Secretariat. In addition video footage of proceedings is stored in the Parliamentary Archives. When Parliament is not in session, these channels air general informative programs, particularly those related to effective government.

== See also ==
- Rajya Sabha TV
- Doordarshan
