= Rajya Sabha TV =

Television channel from India

Rajya Sabha TV (RS TV)
- Country: India
- Broadcast area: Worldwide
- Headquarters: 21-23 Mahadev Road, New Delhi, Delhi (110001), India

Programming
- Languages: English and Hindi

Ownership
- Owner: Government of India
- Sister channels: Lok Sabha TV

History
- Launched: 2021
- Closed: 15 September 2021
- Replaced by: Sansad TV HD
- Former names: Rajya Sabha TV

Links
- Website: www.sansadtv.nic.in

Rajya Sabha TV was an Indian public cable television network channel owned and operated by Rajya Sabha that covered the proceedings of Rajya Sabha (the Upper House of the Parliament of India). It has now been replaced by Sansad TV. Apart from telecasting live coverage of Rajya Sabha proceedings, RSTV also brought detailed analyses of parliamentary affairs. While focused on current national and international affairs, it provided a platform for knowledge-based programmes for the discerning viewer. The channel offered special attention to legislative business undertaken by the Parliament.

In March 2021, this channel and Lok Sabha TV were merged to form a combined parliamentary service, Sansad TV.

Rajya Sabha TV produced the 10-part TV mini-series Samvidhaan, which was directed by the noted film director Shyam Benegal.

Rajya Sabha TV also produced a teleserial and film, Raag Desh, on the trial of Indian National Army officers during British rule. The serial was directed by Tigmanshu Dhulia.

== Programmes ==
Rajya Sabha TV was among a few bi-lingual channels in India, telecasting in India's official languages, Hindi and English.

Rajya TV telecasted 7 news bulletins, 4 in Hindi and 3 in English. Rest of its programming consists of daily and weekly shows, and special programmes.

The following is a list of programmes that were telecast on a daily/ weekly basis on Rajya Sabha TV:

- Vishesh: daily (Mon-Fri) feature programme, which analyses a topical issue in detail, in Hindi.
- In-Depth: daily (Mon-Fri) feature programme, which analyses a topical issue in detail, in English.
- Desh Deshantar: daily (Mon-Sat) programme, which discusses a topic of current national or international importance with experts in the field, in Hindi.
- Big Picture: daily (Mon-Sat) programme, which discusses an important national or international current topic with experts in the field, in English.
- Pulse: weekly audience-based programme on current issues, in English.
- Sarkar: a weekly audience-based panel discussion on current social issues, in Hindi.
- Ayushman Bhav: weekly programme on health matters in which audience questions are also taken, in Hindi.
- Aapkka Kanoon: weekly show in which legal experts discuss common legal issues and guide viewers how to deal with them. Audience queries are also taken during the programme, in Hindi.
- Laws in the Making: weekly feature show on important bills in different stages of their journey in Parliament or its committees, in English.
- Virasat: biopic series on the life and work of eminent personalities in the field of art, literature, culture and film, in Hindi.
- Guftagoo: weekly talk show with eminent personalities in the fields of culture and music, in Hindi.
- Indian Standard Time: weekly interview-based show with visiting foreign dignitaries and intellectuals.
- India's World: weekly programme covering major world events of the week, in discussion with diplomats and analysts, in English.
- Policy Watch: a weekly show featuring discussion of policy matters, in English.
- Shakhsiyat: a weekly show of conversation with eminent personalities in the fields of culture and music, in Hindi.
- Arthniti: weekly interview-based show with key decision-makers and analysts regarding topical subjects in the field of economy, in Hindi.
- Sara Jahan: weekend television magazine of major international events of the week, in Hindi.
- Security Scan: weekly discussion-based programme on defence matters, in English.

== Important features and achievements ==
Rajya Sabha TV was a must-carry channel in India, and all television service providers (Direct-to-home as well as cable TV providers) must carry this channel, as mandated in the advisory issued by the Government of India in 2015 and still in force.

In recent years, Rajya Sabha TV has gained prominence among Indian news and current affairs television channels. Its YouTube channel now has over 5 million subscribers, much ahead of other channels in the same/ similar niches. Now about a million subscribers are added every six months. Some of its shows have been viewed millions of times on YouTube.

On BARC, the audience measurement system for television channels in India, daily programmes of Rajya Sabha TV figure among the top viewed programmes.

The telecast of live proceedings of the Rajya Sabha (the upper house of the Indian parliament) done by Rajya Sabha TV is carried live by most other channels in their news telecasts, without cost or attribution unless used in programmes.

== See also ==
- Doordarshan
