= Zynga Slingo =

2012 video game

- Developer: Zynga
- Platform: Facebook
- Genres: social, casino, slots, bingo game
- Mode: multiplayer

Zynga Slingo is a defunct social casino game developed by Zynga and released on Facebook in February 2012. It was Zynga's first licensed game and a partnership with classic gambling game Slingo.

The game was available in 14 languages, including English, Spanish, French, Dutch, Italian, Portuguese, Chinese, Korean, Japanese, Turkish, Danish, German, Swedish, and Norwegian.

Zynga Slingo was shut down on August 27, 2013.

== Gameplay ==
Players clicked "spin" and matched numbers to fill a slingo card. They could increase their score by earning balls and coins. Players got a "slingo" by matching five numbers vertically, horizontally or diagonally. Players could wager their points — the whole loot or just a percentage — and flip the devil-vs-cherub coin to potentially win big or lose it all. Players could give other players power-ups or act as a Joker.

They could also chat with one another in the chat panel.

Zynga added a "Play with Friends" button to the game, which eventually let players compete for high scores based on the same board.
