= Buzz Bingo =

Bingo club chain in the UK

Buzz Bingo's logo

Buzz Bingo is a chain of bingo clubs in Great Britain owned by Intermediate Capital Group. It has 77 locations. Formerly operating as Gala Bingo clubs, they were re-branded as Buzz Bingo clubs in September 2018, whilst the Gala brand continues to run its own online bingo and casino offerings under the ownership of Entain plc.

== History ==
Buzz Bingo has undergone several changes in ownership and branding including through acquisitions. They were originally Coral branded, a division of Bass plc. In 1983, there were 22 clubs and 24 located in their Pontins holiday camps.

The ownership acquisitions included a chain of 80 bingo clubs from Thorn EMI for £18.2 million in 1983, followed by another 30 by purchasing Zetters Leisure for £23 million in 1988. Granada plc's chain of 74 bingo clubs were added in 1991 for £147 million. This merger with Granada led to the company rebranding as Gala Clubs later that year. Gala was officially launched on 17 October 1991 when 17 clubs re-branded and launched a new image. There followed a series of further acquisitions under the Gala brand, including 17 clubs from Ritz in July 1998, 10 clubs from Jarglen in March 2000 and 27 Riva Bingo Clubs from First Leisure for £90 million in April 2000.

Towards the end of 2000, Gala then began a series of expansions outside of their bingo operations, with casinos from the Hilton Group in December 2000 and the Jamba Online business in 2001. This was later followed by a series of private equity sales of the company starting in February 2003 to the private equity firms Candover and Cinven. Permira bought a stake in the company in August 2005, which valued the business at £1.89 billion. In October 2005, Gala acquired Coral Eurobet for £2.18 billion and changed its name to Gala Coral Group, creating the United Kingdom's third largest bookmaker and largest bingo operator.

By 2015, Gala Coral was acquired by its rival Ladbrokes, but the Gala Bingo clubs were not part of the merger, and were subsequently sold to Caledonia Investments for £241 million in December 2015. This meant that the clubs used the Gala brand under licence from the Ladbrokes-Coral group and decided during 2018 to re-brand as Buzz Bingo.

In 2020, Buzz Bingo became insolvent as a result of its clubs being closed during the COVID-19 lockdown. It underwent a company voluntary arrangement, in which 26 of its 117 clubs were closed permanently, and Caledonia invested £22 million to retain ownership of the company. As England entered a third COVID lockdown in 2021, the company continued to struggle and needed more financing. Caledonia opted not to invest any further money, and instead sold Buzz Bingo for a "nominal amount" to Intermediate Capital Group, which invested £18 million into the company.

== Operations ==
Buzz Bingo operates 82 High Street clubs throughout Great Britain. It launched its online bingo offering, buzzbingo.com, powered by Playtech software, shortly after the rebrand from Gala to Buzz was completed in 2018.

In 2022, in conjunction with Playtech, Buzz Bingo launched their "Single Wallet" offering, paving the way for an omni-channel business. The launch of this product created the possibility for customers to use their funds across both online and the retail estate.

In 2023, Buzz Bingo launched a further online offering, buzzcasino.com, in an aim to further capture the Casino market as well as bingo, again powered by Playtech.
