= History of Bingo =

History of Bingo may refer to:

- History of the American version of bingo
- History of the British version of bingo
