= Sun Bingo =

Online bingo enterprise

- Company type: Private
- Industry: Gambling
- Founded: 2006
- Headquarters: Alderney
- Services: Online bingo
- Parent: The Sun
- Website: sunbingo.co.uk

Sun Bingo is an online bingo operator based and licensed in Alderney. It was established in 2006, and is part of News UK Group, who also operates newspaper The Sun. The company provides an online bingo gaming platform, predominantly for the United Kingdom.

== History ==
Sun Bingo was launched as the bingo arm of The Sun newspaper in 2006, operated by Tombola for a period of four years, until it took over by rival gaming operator Gamesys. During the time operated by Gamesys, Sun Bingo launched their first mobile dedicated site, offering bingo games. In November 2015, News UK and Playtech signed the five year deal to operate Sun Bingo as part of Virtue Fusion, Playtech's Bingo division.

== Television show ==
Sun Bingo has a televised game, named Having a Ball. It began in 2006, presented by hosts Brian Dowling, Rustie Lee and Jean Martyn.

== Sponsorship ==
From July 2018 to May 2019, Sun Bingo officially sponsored The Jeremy Kyle Show.

== Awards ==
- WhichBingo Awards 2014 – Best Television Advert.
- WhichBingo Awards 2014 – Best Chat Team.
