= Coral Island =

A coral island is a type of island formed from coral detritus.

Coral Island may also refer to:

- The Coral Island, an 1858 novel by R. M. Ballantyne
- Coral Island (album), a 2021 album by British rock band The Coral
- The Coral Island (TV series), a children's television show adaptation of the Ballntyne novel
- Coral Island (video game), a 2023 farming sim game
- Ko Hae, a southern island of Thailand
- Pharaoh's Island, also known as Coral Island, a small island in the northern Gulf of Aqaba
- A former pool in Torquay Marine Spa
- Coral Island (Blackpool), a tourist attraction in Blackpool, UK
