= National Bingo Game =

The National Bingo Game is a bingo game operated by the National Bingo Game Association, based in the UK, and played in most licensed British bingo clubs every day except Christmas.

== Origin ==
The game was introduced under UK legislation as a game of multiple bingo. It was launched in June 1986. Technology became available whereby clubs were able to connect to a game control center via modem to receive a pre-selected list of numbers which were called in the same time window in each participating bingo club.

Clubs then relayed the details of the winner in their club back to game control, who would then award the National Prize to the club whose winner had claimed the lowest number of calls across the country and Regional Prizes to the clubs whose winners had claimed in the lowest number of calls in given regions.

== Format ==
The format and pricing of the game have changed several times since its launch. The original price was 25 pence per ticket, but this has changed to £1 for two tickets or £2.50 for five tickets. Prize money has also varied during these changes. Presently, Jackpot Prizes of £250,000, £50,000, £1,000, and £100 are offered as well as a house prize in every club. Currently an ADSL secure internet connection is used to collect and distribute data.

== Controversy ==
The National Bingo Game has been in operation since 1986, operating first under the Gaming Board for Great Britain and now the Gambling Commission.

There have been controversial incidents with winners in the past, the majority of which have been related to disagreements between players over informal agreements to share their winnings which are not honoured. There are also cases where bingo players share their winnings with fellow players, even when they are not present in the club. As these are independent agreements made between players, the National Bingo Game Association has no official role in resolving the disputes.

There have been occasions where underage players have gained admission to a participating club and purchased tickets for the National Bingo Game. As clubs are managed by independent operators, the National Bingo Game has no direct control over this. Players participating in the National Bingo Game must be over 18. An underage person would, by law and under the rules of the game, be ineligible to participate or claim any prize.

== National Lottery ==
The National Bingo Game was Britain's largest computer-controlled gambling game until the National Lottery was launched in 1994. The lottery had a negative impact on attendances at bingo clubs, although the game underwent several changes in an attempt to boost prize money and compete with the lottery. Over £1 billion has been paid out in prize money since the National Bingo Game was launched.

== Rollover jackpots ==
In September 2007, bingo operators were allowed to introduce rollover jackpots for the first time, and the National Bingo Game introduced the "Big N" – an optional £1 jackpot charge to players which gave them a chance to play for a gold, silver, or platinum jackpot which could exceed £1 million.

Ticket sales for the jackpot were lower than anticipated and the prize was not won for a number of months, before the National Bingo Game decided to reduce the participation charge to 50p and make it compulsory in January 2008. As a result of this, 3 jackpots worth at least $1 million were created in the 6 months that followed. Gala Bingo withdrew in September 2008 from the National Bingo Game to launch a competing jackpot.

In November 2007, the first Gold Prize winner won the first "Big'N" prize of £556,000 by getting 6 of the 7 Big'N numbers in Gala Club, East Ham, London. The winner used the proceeds to leave Newham and start a new life in Suffolk.

== Biggest wins ==
- The biggest win ever was on 23 March 2008, when Soraya Lowell of Motherwell, North Lanarkshire won GBP £1,167,795 (USD $1,437,897.25). The game was played in the Club 3000 bingo hall in Coatbridge.

== Game Caller of the Year ==
The National Bingo Game operates a competition for the best bingo caller in Great Britain called the Caller of the Year competition. Regional heats were held across the country, with each winner going forward to the national final. The competition was suspended in 2008 and reintroduced in 2019 as a biennial event.

Recent winners:

- 2022 Benj Maycock, Club 3000
- 2019 Donna Kunyo, Club 3000
- 2007 Blake Robson, Mecca
- 2006 Brett Hyrjak
- 2005 Karl Seth
- 2004 Mandy Gargan
- 2003 Mike Vyse
- 2002 Peter Lewis
- 2001 Alan Stockdale
- 2000 Phil Groom
- 1999 Steve Linder
