= Reader service card =

Card inserted in a magazine

A reader service card or bingo card is a reply card inserted in a magazine to be used by readers to request free product samples and hard copy marketing literature from businesses who advertised in that particular magazine issue. The alternative name "bingo card" comes from the fact these cards include a pre-filled grid of sequential numbers and bear a slight resemblance to cards used to play the game of bingo. Readers fill in their name, address, and telephone number, circle numbers corresponding to advertisers they are interested in, and mail back the card to the publisher, who in turn forwards readers' contact information to the selected advertisers. Advertisements in such magazines include a footer telling readers the appropriate number to circle on the reader service card, and such magazines also include a directory of advertisers to remind readers which numbers correspond to which advertisers. Some magazines used to include so-called "catalog collections", a two- or four-page spread which included up to 12 catalog promotions (all of whom had corresponding numbers on the included bingo card). From the advertisers' perspective, readers expressing interest are sales leads, which implies that reader service cards are a method of lead generation.

Before the World Wide Web was invented, reader service cards relieved consumers (as well as business executives with purchasing authority) of the inconvenience of having to separately contact each advertiser in a particular magazine by mail, fax, telex or telephone to express interest. Instead, they would just mail a reader service card back to the publisher. The postage for the reader service card was often prepaid (where allowed). Over the next few weeks, fat envelopes containing brochures, pamphlets, catalogs, and product samples would arrive in the mail from the selected advertisers. This was a common method for gathering an up-to-date collection of mail order product catalogs and product literature in preparation for a purchasing decision before web sites became the primary delivery vehicle for such information.
