= Joe Coral =

Russian-British bookmaker (1904–1996)

Joe Coral (born Joseph Kagarlitski, 11 December 1904 – 16 December 1996) was a bookmaker and entertainment businessman, most famous for founding Coral bookmakers.

== Early life ==
Coral was born as Joseph Kagarlitski in Warsaw, then part of the Pale of Settlement in the Russian Empire in 1904, to a Jewish family. Coral considered himself to be Russian, rather than Polish.

Following the death of this father, his mother brought the family to England in 1912, unable to speak any English. Believing that the surname would damage the chances of the family integrating, his mother chose the name 'Coral' as she was reading a book called The Coral Island at the time.

Coral contracted polio as a child, which left both his arms crippled.

He left school aged 14, and started as an office junior for a lamp manufacturer on Gray's Inn Road, London. He subsequently became a runner for a street bookmaker, which was illegal at the time. Using a float from money he was gifted at his bar mitzvah he started to directly take the bets himself, rather than run them to his employer, and was fired.

== Early bookmaking ==
He started his proper bookmaking career as an on-track agent at Harringay Stadium taking bets on greyhound racing and speedway, as well as working at White City Stadium and Clapton Stadium.

Coral came up against organised crime boss Darby Sabini at Harringay but held his ground by holding a gun to Sabini's stomach.

His major breakthrough came after he became the first London bookmaker to take bets on individual courses of the Waterloo Cup, and in 1942 he turned a £5,000 profit, establishing him as a bookmaker of repute.

== Coral Leisure Group ==
Following his success in on-track betting, Coral expanded into betting offices.

He was one of the first to take advantage of the new legislation and opened his first licensed betting office in 1961. The new law was not intended to encourage betting and therefore shops were unattractive in appearance and devoid of any comforts.

Coral arranged a merger with another bookmaker, Mark Lane in 1971. By 1979, the company had become the Coral Leisure Group and had diversified to include a variety of other businesses, including casinos, hotels, restaurants, Pontins holiday camps, squash clubs, bingo clubs, and real estate.

In June 1977, Coral opened his first of two "Coral Island" entertainment complexes at the former Torquay Marine Spa, followed by a second in Blackpool the following year. The Coral Island name is shared with the book which gave Coral his adopted surname.

The Coral Island sites were large concrete entertainment complexes with music, gaming machines, and bars, as well as a small outdoor pool and sun terraces. The new attraction at Torquay cost £15m, and the opening was delayed by repeated vandalism.

In January 1981, the Coral Group was acquired by Bass plc. Whilst now owned by a large corporate body, Coral was made Life President of the company, and retained that position until his death.

== Personal life ==
Coral married Dorothy Helen Precha in Edmonton, Middlesex on 25 July 1932, and received a caution for failing to declare the marriage to the authorities, as he was required to do as an alien.

In 1952, after living in the UK for forty years, Coral became a naturalised citizen, although his run-ins with authority nearly prevented it.

Coral died in 1996, shortly after his 92nd birthday.
