= Flimsies =

Type of bingo card

Flimsies are a type of bingo card printed on thin sheets of paper. They are typically printed with three cards on a single sheet, but also come in other formats:

- One card per sheet
- Two cards per sheet
- Four cards per sheet
- Six cards per sheet
- Nine cards per sheet

A win on a flimsy on a "special" game usually pays more, than a win on a "regular" game.

They are also known as flimsy sheets or throwaways.
