= Torquay Marine Spa =

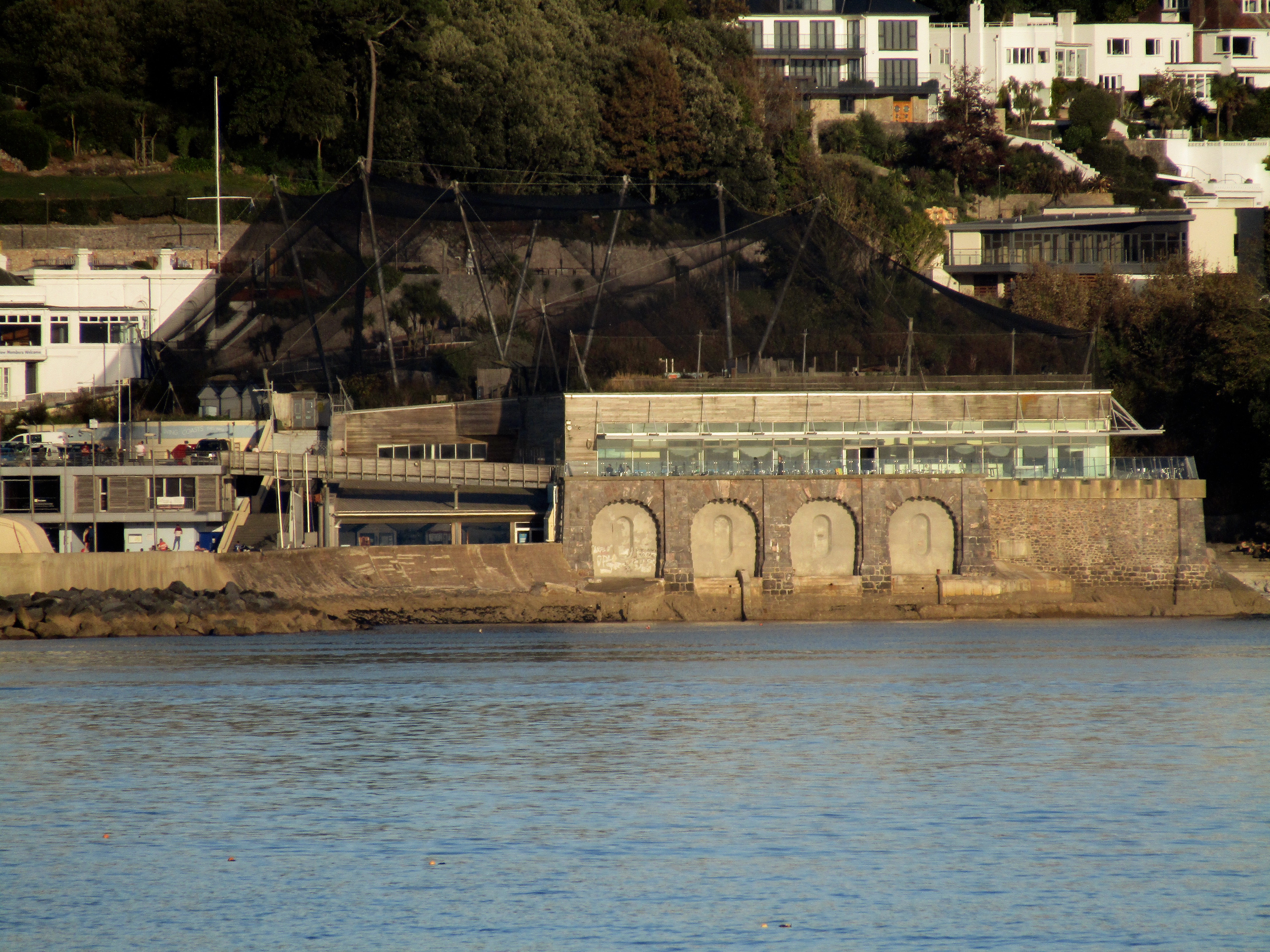
- The spa foundations below Living Coasts

- Location within Devon

General information
- Location: Torquay, Devon, England
- Coordinates: 50.457568°N 3.524378°W
- Opened: 1857
- Demolished: Starting 27 September 1971

The Torquay Marine Spa was a swimming bath and entertainment complex situated on a promontory overlooking Beacon Cove in the town of Torquay, Devon, England. The buildings included a ballroom, concert hall, sunlit conservatory and private bathing facilities. There was also a large public swimming bath open to the sea below these.

== History ==
=== Early 19th century ===
In 1817, Dr Pollard built a swimming bath adjacent to Torquay Harbour, which was known as the Bath House, taking advantage of the popularity of sea bathing, but by the 1850s demand exceeded the capacity of those baths, and a new company was formed to build a new facility on Beacon Hill.

It was planned that there would be a large swimming pool, with a large saloon or hall and private bathing facilities. In order to achieve this, under the direction of Lawrence Palk, 1st Baron Haldon, large parts of the beacon promontory hill were cut away, with spoil being used to being the Haldon Pier enclosing 10 acres of the harbour.

=== Opening and early years ===
The Marine Spa baths were opened on 3 August 1857. The building was in the Italian style, and the complex included two large halls, one used as a ballroom and the other as a roller rink, along with reading rooms. Charles Dickens conducted a number of two-hour long readings from his popular stories in the reading rooms.

The main pool was 45 feet (14 m) by 43 feet (13 m) in size, with a depth between 3 feet (0.91 m) and 7 feet (2.1 m) and had open arches to the sea, where a ladies' bathing cove with a breakwater was located. This breakwater was washed away by a storm in 1859. The spa area had separate men's and women's areas with hot, cold, plunge, douche, and shower baths.

Despite the status, the project was in almost immediate financial difficulty, resulting in the a sale in 1862 and bankruptcy in 1863. The baths then passed into the ownership of Baron Haldon.

=== New swimming bath ===
In 1910, Torquay decided to build a new swimming bath on the site of the spa. The original baths were described as "dark and sunless" and the repeated destruction by storms meant it was costly. The amount of £15,000 was set aside, with a contract signed for £14,912. The onset of World War I delayed the building and by the end of 1915, costs had risen to between £17,000 and £20,000.

The new swimming pool finally opened in late 1916, but following a very short use by the local lifesaving and swimming clubs, was requisitioned for the sole use of the armed forces. This use lasted for nearly 4 years, and the damage and wear required significant remediation, and the baths did not open to the public until 1920.

The new pool took water from the sea below, and was initially heated to 65 °F (18 °C). The sunlight through the roof allowed seaweed to grow and the pool required frequent emptying, with filtration not introduced until 1934.

== Incidents and closure ==
The pool had two serious incidents related to the outflow pipe which returned water to the sea directly below, the second of which directly led to the closure and demolition of the pool.

On 1 September 1930, a tourist girl, 15-year old Phyllis Bastin, jumped into the pool as the emptying pipe was opened, and was sucked through a 12 inches (30 cm) pipe, travelled around 40 yards (37 m) through the pipe, and out onto the beach below. The pipe was covered in corroded metal and barnacles, tearing her swimming costume from her body, and causing her serious injuries. The subsequent septicaemia led her to spending an extended period in hospital, where she was visited by King George V's personal physician Farquhar Buzzard.

As a result, the pool was redesigned, with the outlet vent Bastin was sucked through being removed, and replaced by a similar diameter pipe in the floor of the deep end of the pool, and covered with two strong steel bars.

Torquay's Medical Officer of Health raised concerns over the health and safety of the pool between 1959 and 1965, saying that "many other aspects in which the bath falls short of present day standards of health, safety, and convenience. The reconstruction and modernisation of the baths is long overdue" and he recommended that the site be redeveloped.

The second serious incident came over 40 years after the first, on 13 July 1971, when three children from St Vincent's Children's home were at an evening swimming session in the pool, and challenging each other for who could sit on the bottom of the pool for the longest. When the pool was cleared at 8pm, it became clear that 11-year old John Moran was missing from the group, and all of his clothes still in the dressing cubicle. The alarm was raised, and Torbay Fire Brigade were summoned to help empty the 90,000 imperial gallons (410,000 L) of water, whilst the local sub-aqua club tried to locate the body. The divers were able to see the boy's feet deep in the pipe, but were unable to attach a rope to them.

Moran's body was bent double, and the force of the water had bent apart the metal bars which covered the 12 in (30 cm) pipe. The recovery operation took 26 hours to cut away the concrete end wall of the pool, causing significant damage, which would have cost in excess of £25,000 to repair. With a new pool already planned to open in two years time in Paignton, the council decided to close the pool permanently.

== Use after closure ==
=== Coral Island ===
The pool complex was demolished, beginning on 27 September 1971.

The site was subsequently redeveloped in as the Coral Island complex by Joe Coral, founder of Coral bookmakers, opening in June 1977, ahead of a sister site in Blackpool the following year. This was a large concrete entertainment complex with music, gaming machines, and bars, as well as a small outdoor pool and sun terraces. The new attraction cost £15m, and the opening was delayed by repeated vandalism.

Coral Island, by now owned by Bass Leisure, closed on 18 September 1988, having failed to attract visitors outside of the main tourist season, and it lay unused before being demolished in April 1997.

Following the demolition, the council proposed a new hanging gardens leading down to Beacon Cove, to be open by 1998.

=== Living Coasts ===
From 2003 to 2020 the site was occupied by Living Coasts, a coastal zoo. Its permanent closure was announced on 16 June 2020 due to its high cost base, a need to make efficiencies and inability to afford required substantial maintenance. Homes were sought for the zoo's animals.
