= Gamesys =

Online gambling company based in England

Gamesys Group
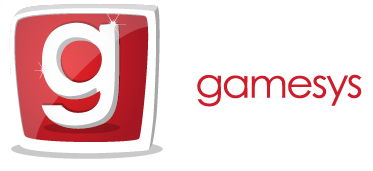
- Type: Public limited company
- Traded as: LSE: GYS
- Industry: Online gambling
- Founded: 2001; 25 years ago
- Headquarters: London, United Kingdom
- Key people: Neil Goulden (chairman); Lee Fenton ( CEO)
- Revenue: ▲£727.7 million (2020)
- Operating income: ▲£93.4 million (2020)
- Net income: ▲£67.2 million (2020)
- Website: gamesysgroup.com

The Gamesys Group is an online software development and gambling business. It was listed on the London Stock Exchange until it was acquired by the U.S. casino operator, Bally's Corporation, in October 2021.

== History ==
The company was founded in by Andrew Dixon, Noel Hayden, Robin Tombs and a small team of software developers in 2001.

Gamesys acquired Virgin Games in January 2013. It then sold its Jackpotjoy brand to The Intertain Group, for a minimum of £425.8 million in February 2015.

In September 2019 JPJ Group carried out a reverse takeover of Gamesys and subsequently changed its name to Gamesys Group. (The acquirer, which was a Canadian online gaming operator established as The Intertain Group in 2014, had become known as Jackpotjoy in January 2017 and then as JPJ Group in June 2018).

In March 2021, the U.S. casino operator, Bally's Corporation, made an offer to acquire the company for US$2.7 billion. The transaction was completed on 1 October 2021.
