= Coral (bookmaker) =

Betting shop chain in the United Kingdom

- Type: Subsidiary
- Industry: Sports betting; Gambling
- Founded: 1926
- Founder: Joe Coral
- Headquarters: Stratford, London, England
- Area served: United Kingdom
- Products: Betting shops, online and telephone betting
- Parent: Entain (since 2018)
- Website: coral.co.uk

Coral is a chain of betting shops in the United Kingdom, owned by Entain. The Coral business was established by Joe Coral in 1926. It grew into an entertainment conglomerate before undergoing a series of ownership changes starting in 1981. As of 2015, Coral had 1,845 shops across the country.

== History ==
=== Foundation ===
Joe Coral began his bookmaking business in 1926 and, although primarily concerned with operating betting pitches at racecourses, together with his friend Tom Bradbury-Pratt, he ran speedway meetings at Harringay and opened a credit office in the West End of London in 1943.

He had greyhound racing pitches at Harringay Stadium and then White City Stadium followed later by Clapton Stadium and Walthamstow Stadium before branching into betting offices.

He was one of the first to take advantage of the new legislation and opened his first licensed betting office in 1961. The new law was not intended to encourage betting and therefore shops were unattractive in appearance and devoid of any comforts.

=== Merger and growth ===
Coral arranged a merger with another bookmaker, Mark Lane in 1971. By 1979, the company had become the Coral Leisure Group and had diversified to include a variety of other businesses, including casinos, hotels, restaurants, Pontins holiday camps, squash clubs, bingo clubs, and real estate.

=== Corporate sale ===
With the business facing a number of difficulties, including the loss of three out of four of its casino licences, a sale was attempted to Grand Metropolitan in 1980, but this attempt failed and the following January a sale was achieved to Bass plc, as part of the Bass Leisure operation.

In January 1998, Ladbroke Group announced that it would buy the Coral betting business from Bass for £375.5 million, a deal involving 891 shops, 50 of them in the Republic of Ireland. Other reports gave the price as £363 million. Ladbroke, which already owned 1,925 shops, conditionally agreed to sell 128 of its British shops to Tote Bookmakers for £41 million to maintain local competition. The acquisition was referred to the Monopolies and Mergers Commission (MMC) in March 1998, and the commission delivered its report to the Secretary of State at the end of July 1998. The MMC found that the acquisition was anti-competitive, and in September 1998 the Secretary of State for Trade and Industry, Peter Mandelson, accepted its finding and ordered Ladbroke to sell the Coral business. Ladbroke's chief executive, Peter George, criticised the ruling, saying that the commission had looked at the deal "through the wrong end of the telescope". The Coral business, except for 59 shops in Ireland and Jersey, was sold in a management buyout financed by Morgan Grenfell Private Equity for £390 million in February 1999.

In November 1999, Coral acquired Eurobet, an online betting operation based in Gibraltar, for £7.1 million. The company changed its name to Coral Eurobet in May 2000. In August 2002, Morgan Grenfell Private Equity agreed to sell Coral Eurobet, which then ran 870 betting shops, to Charterhouse Development Capital for £860 million, with completion expected the following month. The purchase was structured as a management buyout backed by Charterhouse.

In October 2005, Coral Eurobet was acquired for £2.18 billion by casino and bingo firm Gala, which changed its name to Gala Coral Group, creating the United Kingdom's third largest bookmaker and largest bingo operator. Coral Eurobet then owned 1,260 shops and was 84% owned by Charterhouse and 16% by management. Coral and Eurobet continued to operate as divisions of Gala Coral.

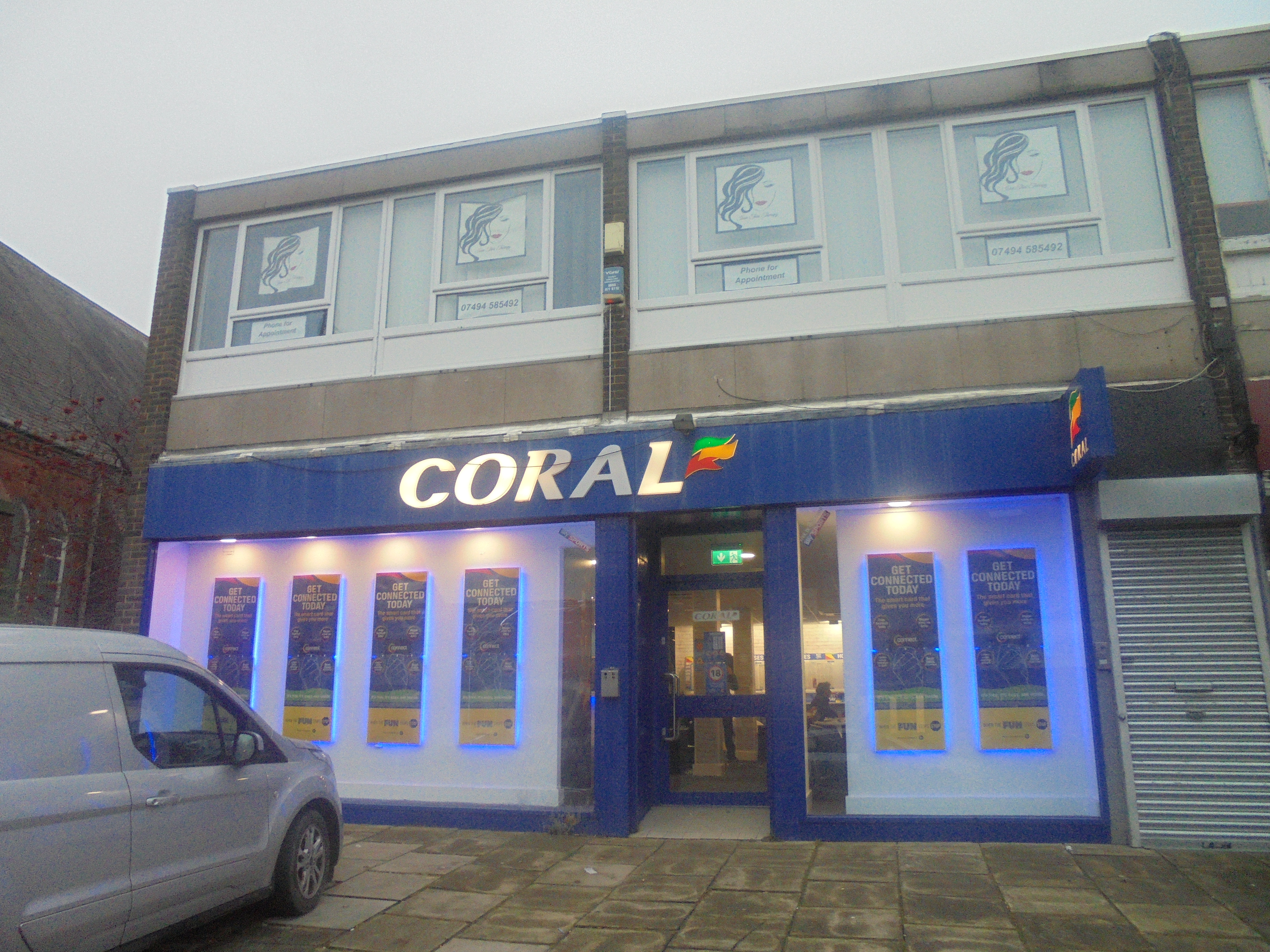
A Coral betting shop in Cross Gates, Leeds.

In July 2009, Coral announced the relocation of their broadcasting department to Milton Keynes to a purpose built studio to manage the inception of its new television channel, Coral TV.

As a condition of clearing the merger, the Competition and Markets Authority (CMA) decided in July 2016 that the merging companies must sell around 350 to 400 betting shops. In October 2016 the companies announced the sale of 359 shops (185 from Ladbrokes and 174 from Gala Coral), with Betfred buying 322 and Stan James 37. In November 2016, Gala Coral was acquired by Ladbrokes, which changed its name to Ladbrokes Coral. Coral and Ladbrokes shops continued to operate under their respective names. GVC Holdings acquired Ladbrokes Coral in March 2018.

== Headquarters ==
In November 2011, Coral announced they had signed for 30,793 sq ft of offices at One Stratford Place at Westfields £1.45bn Stratford City scheme opposite the Olympics stadium in east London.

== Marketing and advertising ==
As part of their 2012 experimental marketing campaign strategy, Coral engaged in the ‘RUN 4 IT’ campaign, requiring brand ambassadors dressed in trademark robber costumes, to physically ‘steal’ customers from competitor bookies. Over the course of this three week campaign, punters were encouraged to change their betting habits with the lure of a guaranteed win loyalty card and then walked by the ambassadors to the nearest Coral. This campaign saw a 7% conversion rate and 2,447 customers were ‘stolen’ from 900 bookies.
