= Gala Bingo =

British casino company

Gala's logo

Gala Bingo is an online bingo and casino offering under the ownership of Entain.

Gala Bingo was created in 1991 as a division of Bass plc. It later became an independent company, and then became the Gala Coral Group after acquiring Coral Eurobet in 2005. After the sale of its 126 clubs in 2015 to Caledonia Investments (who rebranded them as Buzz Bingo in September 2018), Gala Coral retained the online Gala services and was later acquired by Ladbrokes (which was later acquired by GVC Holdings).

== History ==
The chain began as bingo clubs operated by Bass Leisure, a division of Bass plc. As of 1983, Bass had 22 clubs operating under the Coral brand, and another 24 located in its Pontins holiday camps. That year, Bass purchased a chain of 80 bingo clubs from Thorn EMI for £18.2 million. By 1988, Bass was down to 72 locations, but added another 30 by purchasing Zetters Leisure for £23 million.

In May 1991, Bass purchased Granada plc's chain of 74 bingo clubs for £147 million. Combined with Bass's 91 clubs, the chain was tied with the Rank Organisation for the largest bingo operator in Britain. A united brand for the combined operation, "Gala", was chosen by John Murphy of Interbrand as a simple word incorporating letters from "Granada" and "Coral". Gala was officially launched on 17 October 1991 when 17 clubs re-branded and launched a new image.

In 1997 a management buy-in purchased all 130 Gala Bingo Clubs from Bass for £235 million.

Over the next few years, Gala began acquiring other bingo clubs to increase their portfolio, including 17 clubs from Ritz in July 1998 and 10 clubs from Jarglen in March 2000. In April 2000, they added 27 Riva Bingo Clubs from First Leisure for £90 million. Gala diversified outside bingo for the first time when it purchased 26 Ladbroke Casinos for £235 million from the Hilton Group in December 2000. In 2001 it added the Jamba Online business for £1.5m.

The owners sold the whole business for £1.24 billion in February 2003 to the private equity firms Candover and Cinven. Permira bought a stake in the company in August 2005, which valued the business at £1.89 billion.

In October 2005, Gala acquired Coral Eurobet for £2.18 billion and changed its name to Gala Coral Group, creating the United Kingdom's third largest bookmaker and largest bingo operator.

The group added another 10 bingo clubs in 2006 when it purchased the County Clubs in Scotland for £64 million. The company spent another £14.5 million in February 2006, when it bought the Leo Casino in Liverpool from Dolby Management Ltd increasing the number of casinos in the estate to 31 (at the time).

Gala Coral won 403 betting licences in Italy in an open market tender in December 2006, under its Eurobet brand. The group formally established an international division in 2007. The group also set up a joint venture to attempt to launch bingo shops in China.

In 2011, a decision was made to move substantial parts of the business to Gibraltar, including almost all of the remote gaming division. The group, through acquisitions and new developments had over 30 casinos and 1,800 licensed betting offices.

Gala's total clubs peaked at around 174, but since 2007 and the introduction of smoking bans in Great Britain, this total declined to around 140. In their year end accounts of 2012, the company reported employment of 4,801 staff in their bingo clubs, along with 10,849 in 1,600 Coral shops, 2,776 in 25 casinos, 276 in remote gambling and 98 in Italy where it had over 400 betting outlets, plus a further 374 in support staff functions.

In July 2015, Gala Coral agreed to be acquired by its slightly larger rival Ladbrokes. The 130 Gala Bingo clubs were not part of the merger, and were sold to Caledonia Investments for £241 million in December 2015. The merger was completed on 1 November 2016, and Ladbrokes became Ladbrokes Coral.

== Operations ==
As of 2008, Gala Bingo operated 137 clubs throughout the United Kingdom, with approximately a 24% share of all clubs and nearly 40% of National Bingo Game ticket sales up until the operator's withdrawal from the National Game in Summer 2008. Gala has around five million bingo members, of which approximately 1.2 million are active players. Gala Bingo has an average of 600,000 admissions per week.

The bingo division began participation in the Nectar loyalty card scheme on 1 June 2007. Nectar points were originally awarded for club admissions, and additionally for slot machine play from 1 September 2007, a first for the bingo industry. Gala Bingo no longer participates in the Nectar loyalty card scheme.

On 31 July 2007, pensioner Pauline Clarke, 62, became Gala's first GBP millionaire, after winning a tie break against another online player.

Gala TV was a satellite TV channel that aired from 2006 to 2011, showing bingo games.

Online services under the Gala brand are operated by Entain including an online bingo site, GalaBingo.com, a slots focused slot, GalaSpins.com and an online casino, GalaCasino.com.
