= Slingo =

1996 video game

- Company type: Publicly listed company
- Website type: Gambling, Social Gaming
- Available in: English
- Founded: 1994; 32 years ago
- No. of locations: UK, US
- Founder: Sal Falciglia
- Industry: Gambling, Social Gaming
- Services: Slots, Bingo, Casino
- Parent: Gaming Realms PLC
- Website: slingo.com
- Registration: Yes
- Users: 400,000+
- Launched: 1996; 30 years ago
- Current status: Active

Slingo is an online single and multi-player game that combines elements of slots and bingo (the name is a portmanteau of the two games). The game was created by New Jersey real estate developer, Sal Falciglia Sr. in 1994, who also founded the company Slingo, Inc. to create and market games based on the Slingo theme. The initial version of the game launched to the public on AOL in 1996, where it became one of the service's most played titles. In July 2013, RealNetworks acquired Slingo for $15.6 million as part of a push into social casino gaming, at a time when the game drew several million monthly players on Facebook and mobile. In July 2015 RealNetworks announced that it would sell its Slingo and social casino business to London-based gaming company Gaming Realms for $18 million. Slingo has since become popular in the online gambling industry, where many operators host the game and its branded iterations, known collectively as Slingo Originals, are produced by Gaming Realms' studio of the same name. Under Gaming Realms the brand shifted toward business-to-business licensing, and Slingo content has been distributed to online casino operators across regulated markets in Europe and North America. The company reported record revenue of £31.4 million for 2025, most of it from content licensing, with Slingo titles live in around 30 regulated markets.

== General Gameplay ==
The player receives a 5x5 bingo card (sometimes called "The Matrix"). Then they have up to 20 spins to spin the 5 reels slot and match the number on the reels that correspond to their card.

Reel 1 has numbers between 1~15, Reel 2 has numbers between 16~30, Reel 3 has numbers between 31~45, Reel 4 has numbers between 46~60, and Reel 5 has numbers between 61~75.

During the game, other special icons may show up on the reels below the card. Jokers are wild, and can be used to mark off any number in the column in which it appears. There is also a green Super Joker, which can be placed anywhere on the board. (When it appears, and the Super Joker must be played first, before any other numbers.)

Devils also occasionally appear during the course of the game. If a Devil appears in place of a number, the player's score is cut in half. Frequently though, a Cherub may appear and chase the Devil away, shooting it with an arrow before he can take away your points.

Gold Coins will add extra points to your score, and Free Spins add into your Free Spins counter (you can have up to 4 Free Spins at a time). The last four spins of the game (17, 18, 19, and 20) must be bought using points. A player may use accumulated free spins in place of the fee for any of the spins.

In some versions, there is also a time limit. If a player does not take their spin within a time limit, they lose that spin. If a player does not mark off all possible numbers or Jokers within the time limit, those are considered lost.

The game is over when the player uses up all 20 spins, achieves a Full Card, has insufficient points to play the Final Spins, or decides to cash out from spin 17~20 (if that option available). At the end of the game, the winner is the player who has the most points.

== Spinoffs and ports ==
Outside of internet gaming, there have been other Slingo products, including versions of the game for PC and cell phones, and as a handheld electronic game (which features no Super Jokers, multiple Joker bonuses or cherubs due to technical limitations).

Slingo has also been spun off into Slingo-themed slot machines, and scratch-off lottery tickets.

A game show version of Slingo was filmed in The Philippines and Hosted by Joey de Leon on ABC5 in 2007. In 2008, an unsold pilot was produced in the United States, hosted by Michael Burger.

== Scoring ==
Points are earned from Slingo CD-Rom to Slingo Deluxe:

Actions	Value
Marking a number on the board	200 points
Making a Slingo (covered five numbers in a row either horizontally, vertically, or diagonally)	1,000 points
Gold Coin	1,000 points
3 Jokers in one spin (including Super Joker)	1,000 points
4 Jokers in one spin (including Super Joker)	2,500 points
5 Jokers in one spin (including Super Joker)	5,000 points

NOTE: The triple, quad, and quint Jokers bonus didn't exist in the CD-Rom version.

Points are deducted for:

- One of the reel landed on devil (take away one-half of your points)
- Paying for the last four spins
  - spin 17 - 500 points
  - spin 18 - 1,000 points
  - spin 19 - 1,500 points
  - spin 20 - 2,000 points

== Power-Ups ==
Some version of Slingo may offered you a varieties of Power-Ups (such as Daily Challenge), which help you score bigger, help you achieved a Full Card faster, or try to hinder you. Some Power-Ups may appear on the reels, or in the matrix. Here are some of the example:

- All Spins Free: You do not need to pay any points for the Final Spins.
- Arrow Slingos: Adding extra 8 Slingos in an arrow pattern.
- Bonus Square: Special square that moved every spins, bonus started at 1,000 points, and decreased by 100 for each unmatched spin.
- Bounce/Bouncing Slingos: Get a chance of 12 extra Slingos by using all 5 match combinations to bounce Slingos off the side of the board.
- Devil Imp: You got a Devil Imp on your Slingo board, remove them with Joker or Super Joker before he steal half your points.
- Devil Protection: While this power-up is active, Cherub will always saved your behind.
- Extra Coins: Increase the odds of Gold Coins appeared on the reels.
- Extra Jokers: Increase the odds of Joker appeared on the reels.
- Extra Spins: Adding Extra Spins to the reels, when collected, it increased the maximum number of spins for the game (Max. 4 Extra Spins).
- Extra Super Jokers: Increase the odds of Super Joker appeared on the reels.
- Instant Slingo/Cool Joker: Instantly matching all the numbers in that column that this power-up appeared on the reels.
- Multipliers: Adding a x2, x3, and x5 to the reels. There's 2 version of this: one will only lasted for that spin, and the other will be active for a certain amount of spins.
- Nudge/Reel Nudge: If the spin have no match while you have this, the reels will be nudged to give you another chance at a match.
- Patterns: Complete the pattern will give you bonus points. There's 3 version available: Easy, Medium, and Hard.
- Platinum Coins: Adding a Platinum Coins to the reels, worth 5,000 points.
- Power Shot: Matched with any number on the column, and also marked off the squares adjacent to them (not diagonally).
- Powerup-vision: Show you hidden Power-Ups on the matrix while this Power-Up is active.
- Slingo Vision: While this power-up is active, any match-able numbers on the board will light up.
- Time Attack: If you can finish the game before time ran out (not turns time), you gains 100 points per second left on the clock.
- Treasure Chest: Some Tresure Chest will be hidden in the matrix, if you found one, you can risk your score to open it. Treausre will double your score, while the Devil take half your score.

== Millennium and Classic versions ==
For a while, the multiplayer version of Slingo was only available through AOL. A single-player version aimed at children on slingo.com was the closest members could get to the real thing. However, for the new millennium, Slingo launched a new version with newer graphics than the old game, and it had a resemblance to the graphics of the kid's version of the game. Also, the bonuses for three or more jokers were added into the game, and the Devil and Cherub cartoons were revamped. Another revision was done along with a name change in September 2009 to Slingo Classic. This included another graphics update.

== Game modes ==
Some of the CD-ROM versions of the game had different versions of Slingo with slightly different rules:

- Classic Slingo - The original version of the Slingo game.
- Mixed Matrix Slingo - This version has all the numbers in random locations, not just limited to the traditional column. Spin Numbers can be used no matter which column it is on the board, however Jokers still can only choose numbers of the column it is under. This is a more time-based game, since it will take longer to try and search which numbers were hit and where they are.
- Duel Slingo - Play against the computer in a 2-player game board. Both the player & computer take turns alternating to clear the same board and compete to see which will get the highest score.
- Giant Slingo - Same as the original, but a new 'Giant' item is added to the game. If a giant is earned during a 'Spin' and once you choose the numbers or Jokers you can, the Giant will Spin again (except the column he was under) for 4 new numbers on the same turn. This makes it easier to clear the board with basically 2 spins on the same turn.
- Super Squares Slingo - Same as the original, however during each Spin, up to 5 of the numbers on the board will randomly turn Red each turn, indicating a 'Super Square'. Each super square is worth 1800 point bonus if that number is marked & another point bonus is added to your score if you earn a slingo from that square. Also, as well a normal Jokers for normal squares (if used on a super square, it will only count as a normal number), Red highlighted 'Super Jokers' can be used to mark super squares for the full bonus (it can also be used on normal numbers if no super square is in that column).

== Computer versions ==
There have been some stand alone computer versions of the Slingo game.

- Slingo CD-ROM (Hasbro Interactive) 1998
- Slingo Deluxe (Funkitron) 2002
- Slingo Quest (Funkitron) 2006 - Winner of the 2006 People's Choice Zeeby Award for Best Card, Board, or Mah Jong Game
- Slingo Quest - Hawaii (Funkitron) 2008
- Slingo Supreme (Funkitron) 2008
- Slingo Mystery: Who's Gold (Funkitron) 2009
- Slingo Mystery 2: The Golden Escape 2010
- Slingo Quest - Egypt (Funkitron) 2010
- Slingo Quest - Amazon (Funkitron) 2011
- Slingo Supreme 2 (Funkitron) 2012

== Console versions ==
In December 2008, Slingo appeared on the Nintendo DS with a version of Slingo Quest. This version used the DS's touch screen to duplicate the clicking of a mouse to match numbers. The game was published by Mumbo Jumbo.

== Mobile versions ==
There have been two iterations of Slingo for play on mobile phones.

- Slingo-To-Go from SuperHappyFunFun/Kayak Interactive (now part of Oberon Media) 2005 - The game featured direct play between the users of the mobile game and players on Slingo.com.
- Slingo Quest Mobile (Slingo Bingo in EU) from SuperHappyFunFun/Iplay 2007 - This is the mobile version of the Zeeby Award Winning Slingo Quest

== Casino versions ==
Slingo has partnered with high-profile casino organizations such as AC Coin & Slot, IGT - International Game Technology, Spielo / Gtech, Planet Bingo, Sunkist Graphics, Gamelogic, and United States Playing Card Company to bring the Slingo game play to the casino floor.

Locations

- Bally's Atlantic City
- Caesars Atlantic City
- Paris Las Vegas
- Harrah's Reno

Games currently on casino floors include:

- Slingo Bonus Reel Slots
- Slingo Video Slots
- Brasil Slingo Video Slots
- Triple Slingo Jackpot
- Bonus Bet 21
- Slingo Bonus Deluxe
- Slingo Bonus Deluxe Community
- Slingo Classic Bonus

== Handheld version ==
The Slingo LCD handheld game was created in partnership with Tiger Electronics in 1998. It plays similarly to the Classic & Millenium versions of Slingo, but it lacks Super Jokers, and multiple Joker bonuses due to technical limitations (there also a version that included Cherub).
