= Bingo (British version) =

Game of probability played in the United Kingdom

A typical 9×3 bingo ticket, as used in the United Kingdom

Bingo is a game of probability in which players mark off numbers on cards as the numbers are drawn randomly by a caller, the winner being the first person to mark off all their numbers. Bingo, traditionally known as Housey-Housey, became increasingly popular across the UK following the Betting and Gaming Act 1960 with more purpose-built bingo halls opened every year until 2005. Since 2005, bingo halls have seen a marked decline in revenues and many have closed. The number of bingo clubs in Britain dropped from nearly 600 in 2005 to under 400 in 2014. These closures have been blamed on high taxes, the smoking ban, and the rise in online gambling.

In Quebec, this game is called Kinzo. In India, it is known as Tambola.

Bingo played in the UK (90-ball bingo) is distinct from bingo played in the US (75-ball bingo), which has a square ticket layout and a different style of calling.

== History ==
The game itself, not originally called bingo, is thought to have had its roots in Italy in the 16th century, specifically, around 1530. Bingo originates from the Italian lottery, Il Gioco del Lotto d'Italia. The game spread to France from Italy and was known as Le Lotto, played by the French aristocracy. The game is then believed to have migrated to Great Britain and other parts of Europe in the 18th century. Players mark off numbers on a ticket as they are randomly called out in order to achieve a winning combination. The similar Tombola was used in nineteenth-century Germany as an educational tool to teach children multiplication tables, spelling, and even history.

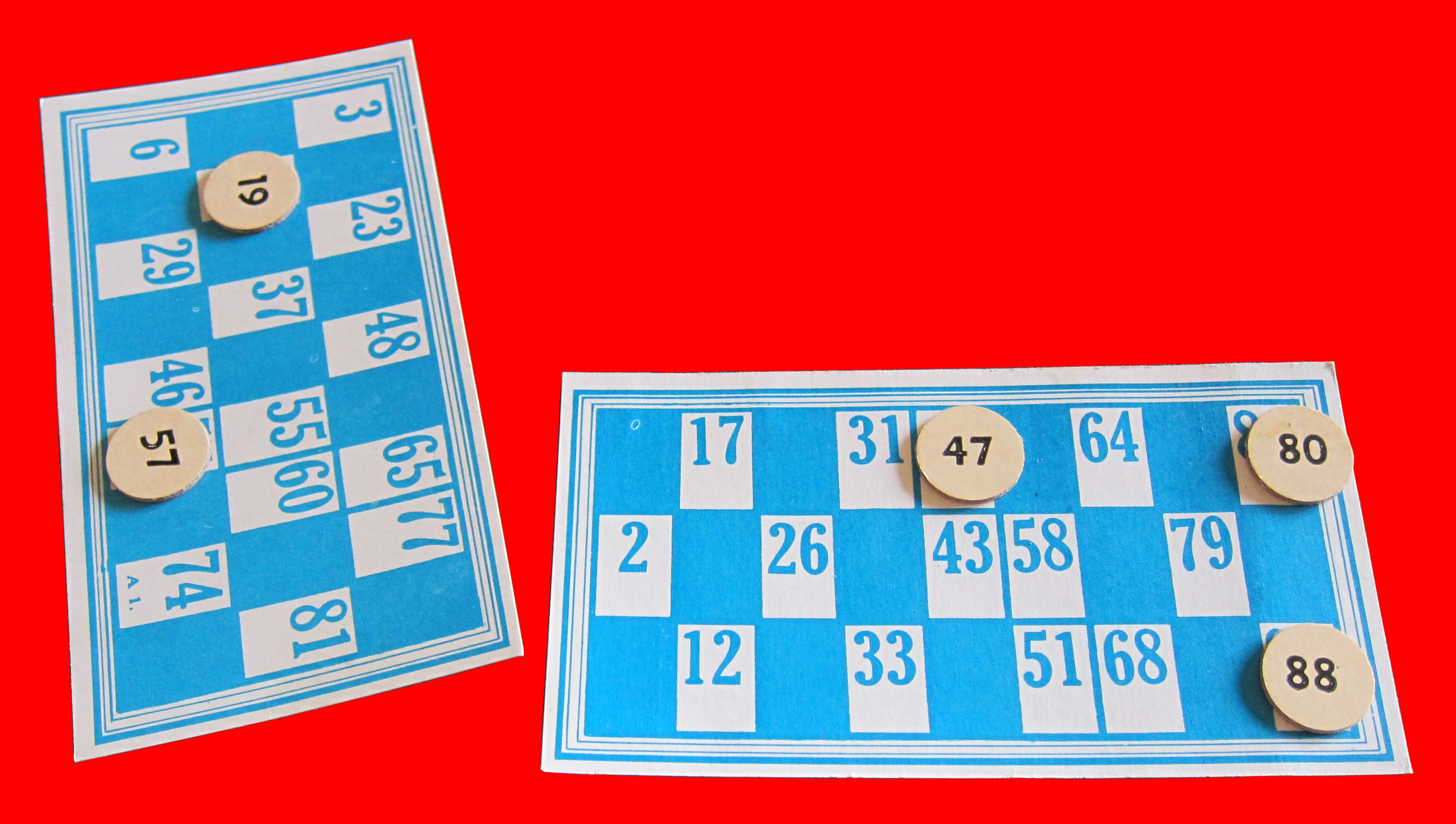
Housey Housey cards and chips

The origins of the modern version of the game and its current name bingo are unclear. Early British slang records bingo as... "A customs officer's term, the triumphal cry employed on a successful search." But it definitely gained its initial popularity with the first modern version of the game appearing at carnivals and fairs in the 1920s and is attributed to Hugh J. Ward, who most probably took the name from pre-existing slang for marketing reasons. The modern bingo card design patent went to Edwin S. Lowe in 1942.

The introduction of the Betting and Gaming Act 1960 on 1 January 1961 saw large cash-prizes legalised and the launch of Mecca Bingo by Mecca Leisure Group, led by Eric Morley, who had a large chain of dancehalls and introduced bingo into 60 of them, including the Lyceum Ballroom. Circuit Management Association, who managed the cinemas and dancehalls of The Rank Organisation, was the other large operator at the time, including hosting bingo at their largest cinema, the Blackpool Odeon.

== Description ==
Bingo is a game of probability in which players mark off numbers on cards as the numbers are drawn randomly by a caller, the winner being the first person to mark off all their numbers.

=== Ticket ===
A typical bingo ticket contains 27 spaces, arranged in nine columns by three rows. Each row contains five numbers and four blank spaces. Each column contains up to three numbers, which are arranged as follows, with some variation depending on bingo companies and/or where the game is played (e.g. hall, club or online):

- The first column contains numbers from 1 to 9 or 10,
- The second column numbers from 10 to 19, or 11 to 20,
- The third, 20 to 29 or 21 to 30 and so on up until the last column, which contains numbers from 80 or 81 to 90.

Tickets are created as strips of 6, because this allows every number from 1 to 90 to appear across all six tickets. A player who buys a full strip of six is guaranteed to mark off a number every time a number is called.

=== Gameplay ===
The game is presided over by a caller, whose job it is to call out the numbers and validate winning tickets. They will announce the prize or prizes for each game before starting. The caller will then usually say "Eyes down" to indicate that they are about to start. They then begin to call numbers as they are randomly selected, either by an electronic random number generator (RNG), by drawing counters from a bag or by using balls in a mechanical draw machine. Calling may take the format of simple repetition in the framework, "Both the fives, fifty five", or "Two and three, twenty three", but some numbers have special calls due to their significance. In some independent clubs, numbers ending in a zero are described as 'blind'. So for example, thirty would be called as 'three-o blind 30' The use of blind numbers is generally restricted to independent bingo clubs, as it is not common practice in either of the largest chains of bingo club operators, Gala and Mecca bingo.

As each number is called, players check to see if it appears on their tickets. If it does, they mark it off with a special marker called a "dabber" or "dauber", or simply cross it off with a pen or pencil, depending on the venue. When all the numbers required to win a prize have been marked off, the player shouts in order to attract the caller's attention. There are no formal rules as to what can be shouted, but most players will shout "yes" or "bingo". Some players may also choose to shout "line" or "house" depending on the prize, whilst others choose to shout "house" for any win (including a line or two lines), players may use any other call to attract the caller's attention (should they wish).

The different winning combinations are:

- Four corners - the leftmost and rightmost numbers on the top and bottom lines.
- Line – covering a horizontal line of five numbers on the ticket.
- Two Lines – covering any two lines on the same ticket.
- Full House – covering all fifteen numbers on the ticket.
  - In New Zealand bonus (Super Housie) games, often three lines may be claimed – top, middle and bottom, usually with much larger prizes, are also played at various times throughout the session.
  - In the UK, it is most common for a four corners game or a line game to be followed directly by a two line game and a full house game, or just by a full house game.
  - In the UK's National Bingo Game only a full house game is ever played. The record payout for the national bingo game is over £1,100,000.
  - In all cases, the last number called must be in the winning sequence. If a player does not stop the game in time and the caller calls out the next number the player's winning claim is often invalidated.

An official or member of staff will then come and check the claim:

- In the UK with the increasing computerisation of bingo systems, an Auto-Validate system is often used in large clubs where a 1 to 8 digit security code is read out by a member of staff and checked against the entry for that ticket on the system. This saves the club from the time-consuming exercise of reading out every number on the ticket.
- It is very unusual, even in the smallest of bingo clubs, for the numbers to be checked against the numbers generated by the caller. The only circumstances when this is done is when there is a computer error in the club that means that the Serial number or perm number of the winning ticket cannot be identified.

There will often be an interval halfway through the game.

== Electronic ==
Most bingo clubs in the UK now offer electronic bingo. This allows players to purchase more than the standard 6 tickets per game, thus increasing their chances of winning. Customers purchase 'bingo packages', consisting of a certain number of tickets for each game, as well as extra flyers or special tickets such as National Bingo Game tickets. The electronic terminal on which the game is played automatically marks the numbers off the tickets when each number is called. It then orders the tickets so that the best tickets in play can be seen on the screen. This allows players to purchase a larger number of tickets than they would usually be able to handle from playing on paper. Of course, the cost of electronic bingo is proportionally higher than playing the standard 6 tickets. In order to encourage more customers to play electronic bingo, clubs usually sell "Electronic Bingo Packages" which effectively makes the cost of each ticket better value for money. For example, if a club was selling strips of 6 for £12 for a session, which corresponds to £2 per ticket, then they may sell an Electronic Bingo Package of 24 tickets for £36; £1.50 per ticket.

The electronic board on which the tickets are played are usually black touchscreen terminals, with screens slightly larger than DVD cases. Players who use these terminals are required to use their club membership to add credit to their club 'accounts' in order to purchase bingo tickets. When a player wins, they are still required to shout. After their claim is verified, the winnings are automatically deposited into the players bingo account. This means that the staff member who verifies their claim does not need to physically provide them with their cash winnings. The electronic boards now offer many features including Mechanised Cash Bingo, in which players can play up to four boards instead of the usual two, as well as a variety of slot games and other gambling-based amusements. Players can either add credit to their bingo accounts to play these games, or spend bingo winnings. As of 2009, some larger Gala Bingo clubs have been able to offer 'Wizard Terminals', which use exactly the same software as their clubs' touchpads, but have large upright screens which people play on, and are dedicated to one section of the club, often known as the 'Wizard Area'. In June 2012, Mecca Bingo introduced, for the first time, a similar section of electronic screens to its club in Catford, as part of trial to see if they should be introduced into other clubs across the chain.

Two of the largest bingo club operators in the UK (Mecca Bingo Ltd. (part of The Rank Group plc) and Gala Bingo (Gala Coral Group Ltd.)) offer electronic bingo in most of their clubs. Electronic bingo has become more and more popular in the UK in recent years.

=== Mechanised cash ===
Mechanised cash bingo, also known as electronic bingo, is a variant of traditional paper bingo that utilizes electronic boards and automated systems for gameplay. Unlike paper bingo, which is played on physical cards with daubers, mechanised cash bingo uses electronic boards with a 4x4 grid split into four columns of colours. Each column is associated with a specific range of numbers:

- Numbers 1–20: red
- Numbers 21–40: yellow
- Numbers 41–60: blue
- Numbers 61–80: white

Assigning colours to numbers helps differentiate between similar numbers, such as 17 and 70, which can be easily confused. For instance, 17 is represented as 'red 17' and 70 as 'white 70.' This simplifies the calling process, as the automated voice does not need to spell out the numbers but can simply announce the colour and number combination, allowing for faster calls (usually around 1.5 seconds per number).

In most UK bingo clubs, including Club 3000 Bingo and Mecca Bingo clubs, mechanised cash bingo is played on plastic boards with small windows that cover the numbers as they are called. At Mecca Bingo clubs, bingo cards are integrated into the tabletops, and numbers are covered using small plastic chips.

A typical mechanised cash bingo board, integrated into the tabletop

The gameplay involves a computer, known as a stage rig controller, which automatically deducts a "participation fee" (par-fee) set by the operator (typically between 40% and 60%). The remaining credit is added to the prize pool. Players can choose when to play by inserting credit into a coin slot, with games typically costing either 50p or £1 per board. Most clubs offer two boards per coin slot, labelled Board A and Board B. Initially, only Board A is activated when credit is added. To activate Board B, players must insert extra credit and press their claim buttons. Alternatively, players can use electronic bingo terminals to select boards (A, B, C, or D).

In fast-paced electronic bingo games, players press a claim button to signal a winning combination, allowing operators to collect more frequent par-fees. Prize money is delivered to the winner's table, and electronic board winnings are automatically added to their bingo account. In Northern Ireland bingo clubs, different regulations apply, and callers announce wins without player participation. This approach enables players to play more positions for a better chance of winning.

=== Online ===
The prevalence of the online bingo games has dramatically increased the number of online gamers and many online gaming community members in the UK have started learning and participating in bingo.

== Linking ==
In order to encourage more people to play, and to offer better prize money, larger bingo operators offer games which are linked with other clubs, generally known as "the Link". Generally, between 10 and 20 clubs will link up and play a much larger game of mechanised cash bingo, with prize money in the hundreds. One person from one club will host the game, talking to all other clubs simultaneously over their microphone system. When someone in a club wins, the host from the winning club will say 'claim in...' followed by the name of the club. For example, if there was a winner in Gala Bingo in Wavertree Park, then the host of the Wavertree Park club would immediately turn on their microphone and say 'Claim in Wavertree Park'. As of September 2011, when Gala Bingo stopped operating their own version of a national bingo game (see National Bingo Game), they introduced a Mechanised Cash Bingo link known as 'Party Xtra XL'. This game is played amongst all Buzz Bingo clubs in Great Britain before each Main Session, with prize money typically ranging between £4,000 and £8,000 for weekday afternoon sessions and between £10,000 and £21,000 for evening and weekend afternoon sessions. The highest amount ever won for this game was approximately £26,000, won by a single player on 17 October 2011. Most Gala clubs were exceptionally busy, because this was the date of Gala's 20th anniversary.

In November 2012, Mecca introduced its own version of Buzz's National Party Xtra XL game, known as the Richest Link. Equally, all Mecca clubs in the UK link up offering prize money worth thousands of pounds. In addition to this, if a winning player claims on their top red number, then they win the jackpot of an extra £10000 on top of their full house prize money.

Mainstage bingo can be played as a link, in the same way that mechanised cash bingo is played as a link. This allows more prize money to be offered per game. One person from one club is the caller, and his or her voice is broadcast across all clubs taking part in the link. At all Gala Bingo clubs in the UK, the "Last Chance" is a two-page book of 6 tickets which is played across around 30 clubs. People play the game in exactly the same way as ordinary mainstage bingo, and the same game rules apply. The prize money is £100 for a line, £100 for two lines and £100 for a full house during afternoon sessions and £200 for a line, £200 for two lines and £200 for a full house during evening sessions across both pages of the book. If somebody has a claim, they are still required to shout. The host of the winning club then turns their microphone on and says 'claim in...' followed by the name of the club, which stops gameplay so that the claim can be checked.

It is sometimes necessary to have a linked game during the main session across certain clubs where the amount of ticket sales for that club has not been high enough to allow for a considerable amount of prize money. For example, during weekday afternoon sessions and Monday and Wednesday evening sessions, The Gala Bingo clubs in Aldershot, Dover, Maidstone, Nottingham St. Anne's and Wokingham link up for four pages of gameplay during the first half of Gala Bingo's Main Event. This allows them to offer better prize money to customers given the fact that the clubs are very small and don't generate enough money from book sales to offer considerable prize money.

== Clubs and businesses ==
Bingo became increasingly popular across the UK following the Betting and Gaming Act 1960 with more purpose-built bingo halls opened every year until 2005. Since 2005, bingo halls have seen a marked decline in revenues and the closure of many halls. The number of bingo clubs in Britain has dropped from nearly 600 in 2005 to under 400 as of January 2014. As of May 2023, there were around 260 bingo halls. These closures are blamed on high taxes, the smoking ban, and the rise in online gambling, amongst other things.

Bingo is a declining yet highly profitable business, with many companies competing for the customers' money. The largest companies with bingo clubs in the United Kingdom are Mecca Bingo Ltd. (part of The Rank Group plc) and Buzz Bingo. In Northern Ireland, one of the largest bingo club groups is the Planet Bingo Group, with seven clubs around the region.

Online bingo is also played online, with services from operators such as Sun Bingo.

=== National Bingo Game ===
The National Bingo Game is a bingo game operated by the National Bingo Game Association since 1986 and played in most British bingo clubs. The largest National Bingo Game operator in the UK is Buzz Bingo with approximately 97 clubs participating in the game.

=== Practices ===
==== Purchasing tickets ====
When players first arrive at the venue they can buy a book of tickets. Players generally buy their Main Session first, followed by any flyers such as National Bingo Game tickets, Early and Late sessions and special tickets.

In UK bingo clubs, all books are purchased from a book sales desk, located usually in the entrance of a club. Playing is divided into sessions with different books, each with a designated number of pages. In most UK bingo clubs, including all Gala and Mecca clubs, the first session, known as either the 'Early Session' (at Mecca) or the 'First Chance' (at Gala) or ‘Early Bird’ in some independents is a three-page book played at around 13:00 for afternoon sessions and 19:00 for evening sessions, although the actual start time can vary per club. This is followed by a break in which mechanised cash bingo is played. This is followed by the main session (known as the Main Event at Gala), which consists of around 11 pages of bingo with a break in the middle of around half an hour. When players purchase their tickets, almost all players purchase tickets for the main session. Some arrive earlier and purchase books for the early session. When the main session finishes, there is another break with more mechanised cash bingo followed by a late session. At Mecca, the late session consists of three pages and costs £3. At Gala, a link is played for the late session (known as the 'Last Chance') and consists of two pages and is free.

==== Windfalls ====
Most bingo clubs offer windfalls on certain games, which allows clubs to offer significantly more prize money for a certain game without having to pay out that amount of prize money every time the game is played. Windfalls vary per club, some clubs offering more windfalls during a session of bingo than others. Some clubs charge for certain windfalls, whereas other windfalls are free. For example, the bingo bonus played at all Mecca clubs generally costs an extra £1 to play. Examples are:

- Double Bubble: call house on any of the numbers 11, 22, 33, 44, 55, 66, 77 or 88 and win double the full house prize money (played at all Gala Bingo clubs in the UK)
- Lucky Stars: on pages of bingo where the Lucky Star game is played, each player is assigned a number from 1 to 90. This number is known as their Lucky Star. If they call house on their lucky star, then they can win an extra £1000 if playing during an afternoon session or £2000 if playing during an evening session. (played at all Gala Bingo clubs in the UK)
- Bingo Bonus: call house in a certain number of calls and win the jackpot. This is played across all Mecca Bingo clubs in the UK and the jackpot varies from £750 to £1500, depending on the club in which it is played. The number of calls in which to call house varies also, for example the Mecca Club in Beeston states that if you call house in 46 numbers or less on the bonus page, then you win an extra £1500. In Mecca Knotty Ash, if you call house in 49 numbers or less on the bingo bonus page, you win an extra £1000. In Mecca Thanet, if you call house in 47 numbers or less on the bingo bonus page, you win an extra £1000. As you can see, in some Mecca clubs it is easier to win £1000 on the bingo bonus page than others, because the number of calls required to win varies depending on the size of the club.

== Regional differences ==
In UK bingo halls, mechanised cash bingo is prevalent. In Northern Ireland bingo clubs, distinct laws lead to a common practice called "parti bingo," where the caller announces a winning position without player participation, allowing customers to play more positions for a better chance of winning.

=== Gambling ===
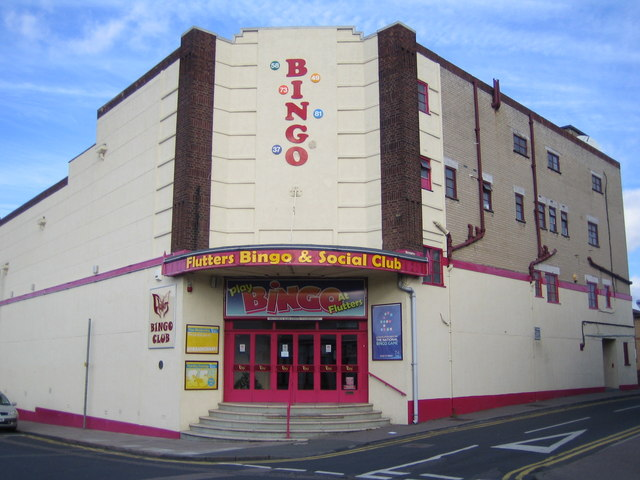
A bingo hall in Biggleswade

In the UK, entering a bingo hall premises or taking part in online bingo is illegal to anyone under the age of 18 because it is regarded as gambling. Bingo is now regarded as a leisure industry, thought to be worth around £1.3 billion.

== Nicknames ==
In the game of bingo in the United Kingdom, callers announcing the numbers have traditionally used some nicknames to refer to particular numbers if they are drawn. The nicknames are sometimes known by the rhyming phrase 'bingo lingo' and there are rhymes for each number from 1 to 90, some of which date back many decades. In some clubs the 'bingo caller' will say the number, with the assembled players intoning the rhyme in a call and response manner, in others, the caller will say the rhyme and the players chant the number. In 2003, Butlins holiday camps introduced some more modern calls devised by a professor of Popular Culture in an attempt to bring fresh interest to bingo.

Since the introduction of the electronic random number generator (RNG) in bingo halls in the UK, the usage of the nicknames or bingo calls above in mainstream bingo has dramatically decreased.

== In popular culture ==
Dave Carey released the song "Bingo (I'm In Love)" in 1961, following the increased popularity of bingo in the UK.

The BBC1 game show Bob's Full House, hosted by Bob Monkhouse, was based on bingo. Unlike a normal bingo card, which uses a 3×9 grid with the numbers 1 to 90, the show only used a 3×6 grid with the numbers 1 to 60 on the contestants' cards and the Gold Card bonus round board.

BBC Television also produced a sitcom, Eyes Down, starring Paul O'Grady, which ran for two series (2003–2004) and focused on the staff at a bingo club.

The BBC's Timeshift TV series covered bingo in the episode "Eyes Down! The Story of Bingo". In 2020, a pilot episode of Full House, a documentary made by production company Tuesdays Child the previous year, was aired. Centred around a bingo club, Majestic Bingo, at Judge's Hall, Tonypandy, in South Wales, it returned for a series in 2022.

== See also ==
- Federation of European Bingo Associations
- Gala Coral Group
- National Bingo Game
- The Rank Group
- Mecca Bingo
