= Online bingo =

Game of chance

Online bingo is the game of bingo (either the US or UK variant) played on the Internet. Sites offering the game launched around 1996, and the global gross gaming yield outside of the United States was estimated at US$500 million in 2006, forecast to grow to $1 billion by 2010.

Unlike physical balls used in regular bingo halls, online bingo sites use a random number generator. Most bingo halls also offer links to online poker and casino offerings as the patrons are often in the target market. One notable feature of online bingo is the chat functionality, with sites striving to foster a sense of community and interaction between players to assist customer retention.

== History ==
One of the earliest known online bingo games, launched in 1996, was a free bingo game called "Bingo Zone". To play, members had to provide demographic information; in turn, members would receive targeted ads based on the demographics provided. Another early pioneer for free online bingo was Uproar, which launched Bingo Blitz in 1998.

== Legality ==
The game of bingo has been able to sidestep many of the laws which ban gambling online. In England, for instance, section 65 of the 1928 Royal Commission Report on Gambling states, “Bingo is a lottery played as a game.” The report details that a game of chance is different than that of casino games, even requiring separate licensing. Since each bingo participant receives a random set of numbers, the chances of winning for each participant are equal. The Royal Commission Report has given the game of bingo a chance to thrive in the highly contested cyber gambling community.

== Playing ==
Playing bingo online, players can make use of optional features which make playing the game easier, such as auto-daub. Auto-daub automatically marks off the numbers on cards as they are called, so players don't have to. Most software providers support other gaming features as "Best Card Sorting" and "Best Card Highlighting" where players cards are sorted and highlighted by closest to bingo.

There is variety among the different kinds of bingo games that can be played. For example, some inexpensive game rooms appeal to the player who may want to play for as little as 3 cents or 3 pence per card, some bingo games only allow players to purchase the same number of cards so they are not competing against the "high rollers" out there who buy many cards for the same game.

== UK ==
Bingo is a popular leisure activity for people in the UK. The UK market has seen an influx in big brand names launching bingo games on their already established websites in addition to a number established land based operators including Mecca and Gala also entering the market. More recently "charity bingo" has become established.

From April 2009 and March 2014 the UK Gambling Commission has been monitoring how many people are gambling. From April 2013 and March 2014 there was a 6% increase in people gambling compared to the same time last year with over £6.8 billion spent including Bingo. In the same period there was also a 22% increase in people playing Bingo on their mobile phones. In 2013, 102,715 people were employed across the gambling industry in the UK, signaling a 5.3% drop from 2012.

Since November 2017, Tombola, a UK-based online gaming company, sponsors the British TV series I'm a Celebrity...Get Me Out of Here!. Tombola had previously sponsored Emmerdale on ITV for three years.

== See also ==
- Problem gambling
