= Bingo (American version) =

American game of chance

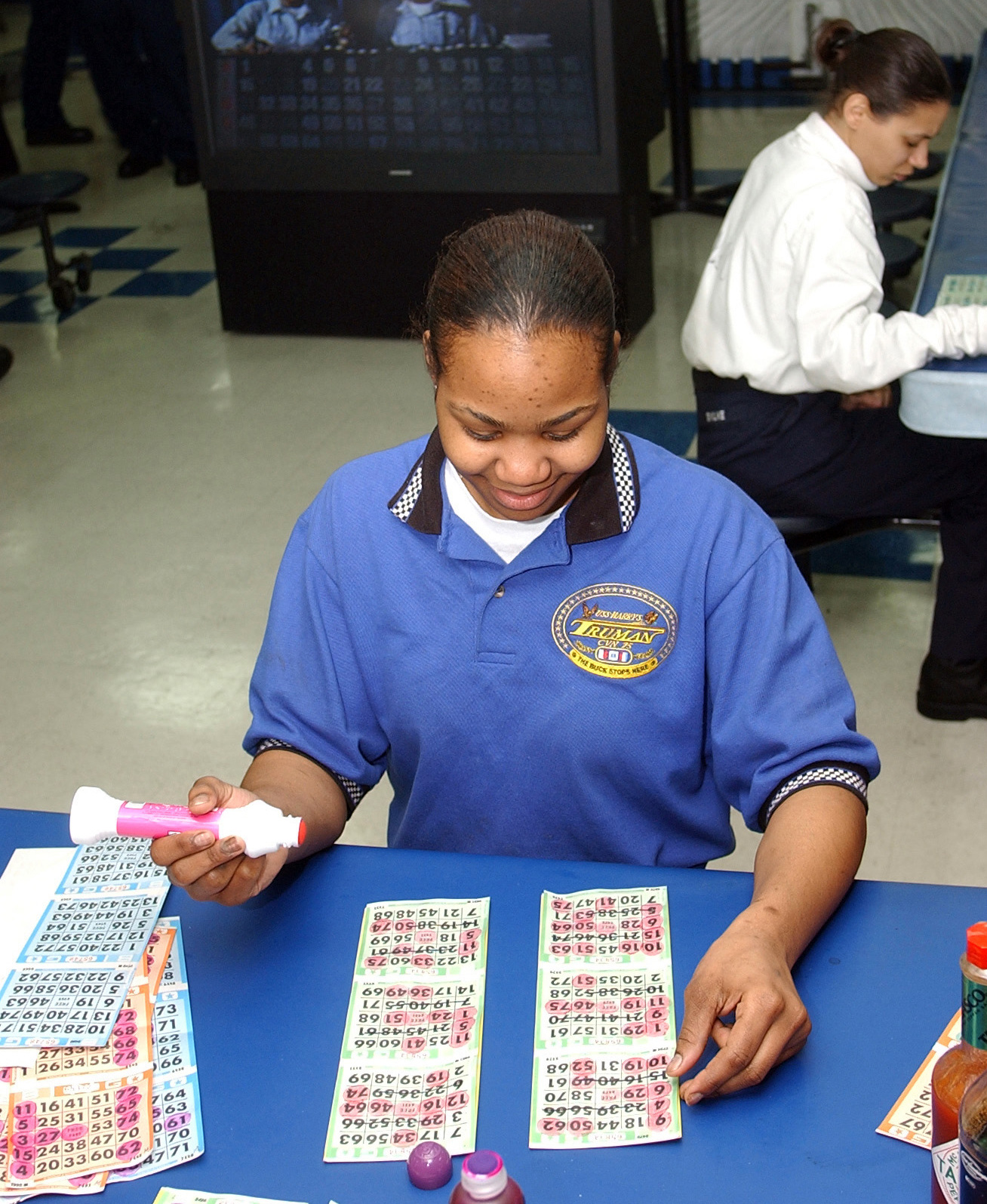
- A player examining their bingo cards
- Years active: 1920s to present
- Chance: Pure chance
- Age range: Varies

Bingo is a game of chance in which each player matches the numbers printed in different arrangements on cards. The game host (known as a caller) draws balls at random, marking the selected numbers with tiles. When a player finds that the selected numbers are arranged on their bingo card in a horizontal, vertical, or diagonal line, they call out "Bingo!" to alert all participants to a winning card, which prompts the game host (or an associate assisting the host) to examine the card for verification of the win. Players compete against one another to be the first to have a winning arrangement for the prize or jackpot. After a winner is declared, the players clear their number cards of the tiles and the game host begins a new round of play.

Alternative methods of play try to increase participation by creating excitement. Since its invention in 1929, modern bingo has evolved into multiple variations, with each jurisdiction's gambling laws regulating how the game is played. There are also nearly unlimited patterns that may be specified for play. Some games require only one number to be matched, while cover-all games award the jackpot for covering an entire card. There are even games that award prizes to players for matching no numbers or achieving no pattern.

== History ==
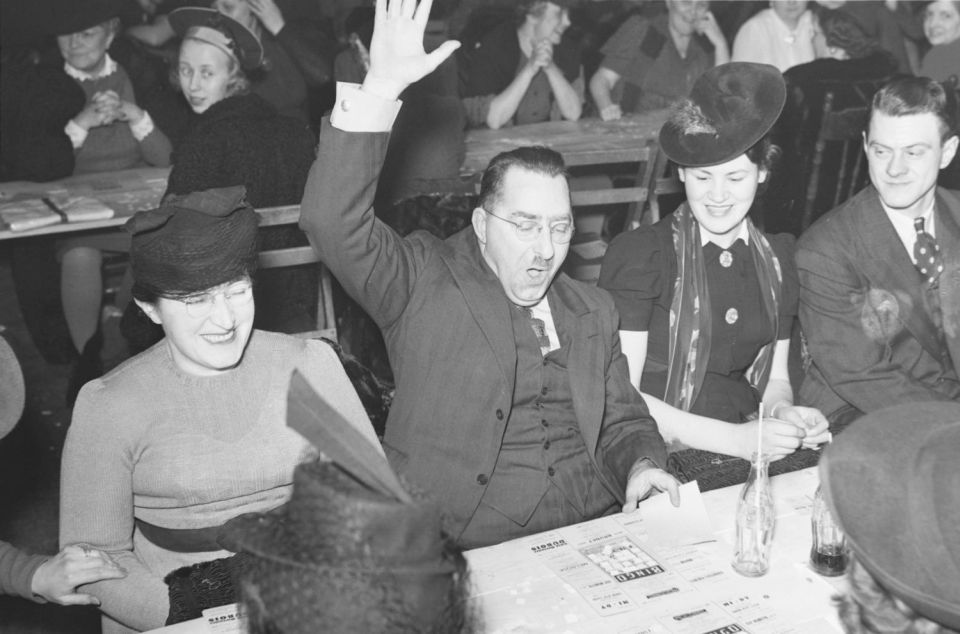
A bingo winner in Montreal, Quebec in 1941

A game of chance named lotto was being played in Italy by about 1530. In the 18th century, a home version (called Tombola) was created in Naples with the addition of cards, tokens, and the calling out of numbers. In the nineteenth century, a game like this was widely played in Germany to teach children spelling, animal names, and the multiplication table.

The French game Le Lotto appeared in 1778, featuring 27 squares in a layout of three rows and nine columns. Five squares in each row had numbers ranging from 1 through 90, which led to the modern design.

In the early 1920s, Hugh J. Ward created and standardized the game at carnivals in and around Pittsburgh and the Western Pennsylvania area. He copyrighted it and published a rule book in 1933.

The game was further popularized by Edwin S. Lowe. While at a traveling carnival near Atlanta in December 1929, the toy merchandiser saw people eagerly playing a game called "Beano", following Ward's rules, with dried beans, a rubber stamp, and cardboard sheets. Lowe took the game to New York, where friends liked playing it. Popularity increased dramatically during the Great Depression as Catholic churches adopted the game as a fundraiser. The Lowe-produced bingo game had two versions: a 12-card set for $1.00 and a $2.00 set with 24 cards. By the 1940s, there were bingo games throughout the US.

In 1977, Mark L. Gitlin designed an electronic system with a flashboard large enough to be read from all corners of a large hall. By 1989, Mark, along with his wife Mitzi Schafer Gitlin, designed and developed enough complete bingo systems and flashboards to sell. Bingotech Systems were soon installed at Sam's Town in Las Vegas, in hundreds of church and school sites, on Native American reservations, military bases in Japan and Germany, and five sites in Colombia, South America.

The origin of the name Bingo is unknown but may date to the mid-1920s. There are claims that one of Lowe's friends was so excited to have won that she yelled out "Bingo" instead of "Beano", or that the word echoes the sound of a bell.

== Cards ==
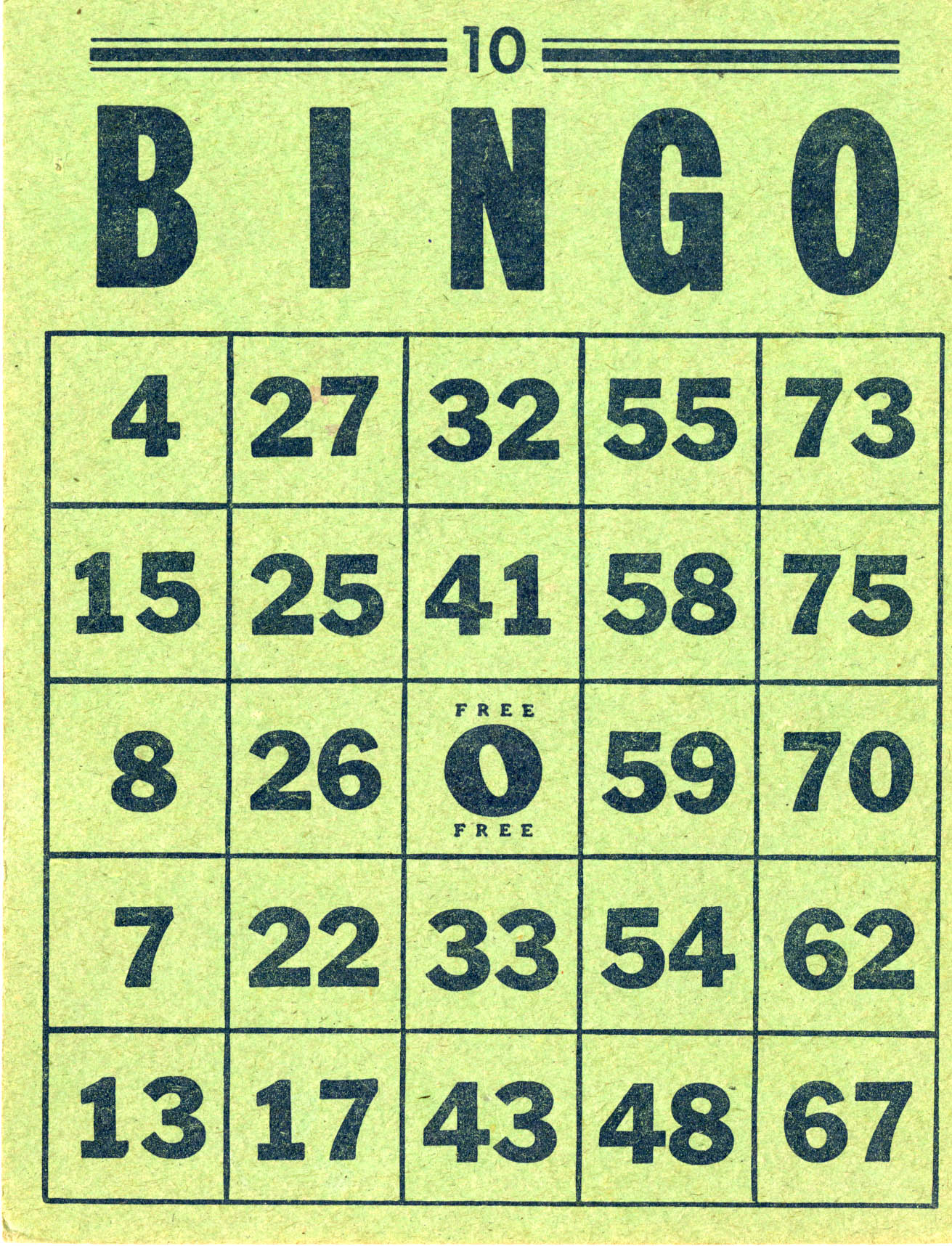
A bingo card

The most common bingo cards are flat pieces of cardboard or disposable paper that contain 25 squares arranged in five vertical columns and five side-to-side rows. Each space in the grid contains a number, except the middle square, which is designated a "free" space.

A typical bingo game utilizes the numbers 1 through 75. The five columns of the card are labeled 'B', 'I', 'N', 'G', and 'O' from left to right. The center space is usually marked "free" or "free space", and is considered automatically filled. The range of printed numbers that can appear on the card is normally restricted by column, with the 'B' column only containing numbers between 1 and 15 inclusive, the 'I' column containing only 16 through 30, 'N' containing 31 through 45, 'G' containing 46 through 60, and 'O' containing 61 through 75.

The number of all possible bingo cards with these standard features is P(15, 5) × P(15, 5) × P(15, 5) × P(15, 5) × P(15, 4) = 552,446,474,061,128,648,601,600,000 or approximately 5.52×10^{26}. The way the numbers are assigned to each column makes a horizontal line win about three times more probable than a vertical line win when many people play together.

In u-pick 'em bingo and other variants of bingo, players are issued three 25-number cards that contain all 75 numbers that may be drawn. Players then mark which numbers they wish to play and then daub those numbers according to the numbers drawn. In addition, double-action cards have two numbers in each square.

A player wins by completing a row, column, or diagonal. The most chips one can place on a bingo board without having a bingo is 19, not counting the free space. (For this to happen, two spots in opposite corners must not be filled along with a spot on one corner of the center away from the two opposite corner spots and finally opposite to that in relation to the center would be two flat against the center piece.)

In addition to a straight line, other patterns may be considered a valid bingo in special games. For example, a 2×2 square of marked squares in the upper-right-hand corner could be considered a "postage stamp". Another commonly valid pattern is covering the four corners. Certain special games only count specific patterns as bingos, such as a roving 'L', which requires players to cover all B's and the top or bottom row or all O's and the top or bottom row, or a blackout, covering all 24 numbers and the free space.

== Equipment ==
The numbers that are called in a game of bingo may be drawn utilizing a variety of methods to randomly generate the ball call. With the expansion of computer technology in bingo, electronic random number generators (RNG) are now commonplace in most jurisdictions. Some require mechanical ball draws which may utilize a randomly shuffled deck of bingo calling cards, a mechanical ball blower that mixes ping pong balls with blown air, or a cage that is turned to mix small wooden balls. All methods essentially generate a random string of numbers that players match to the bingo cards that have numbers on them.

== Culture ==
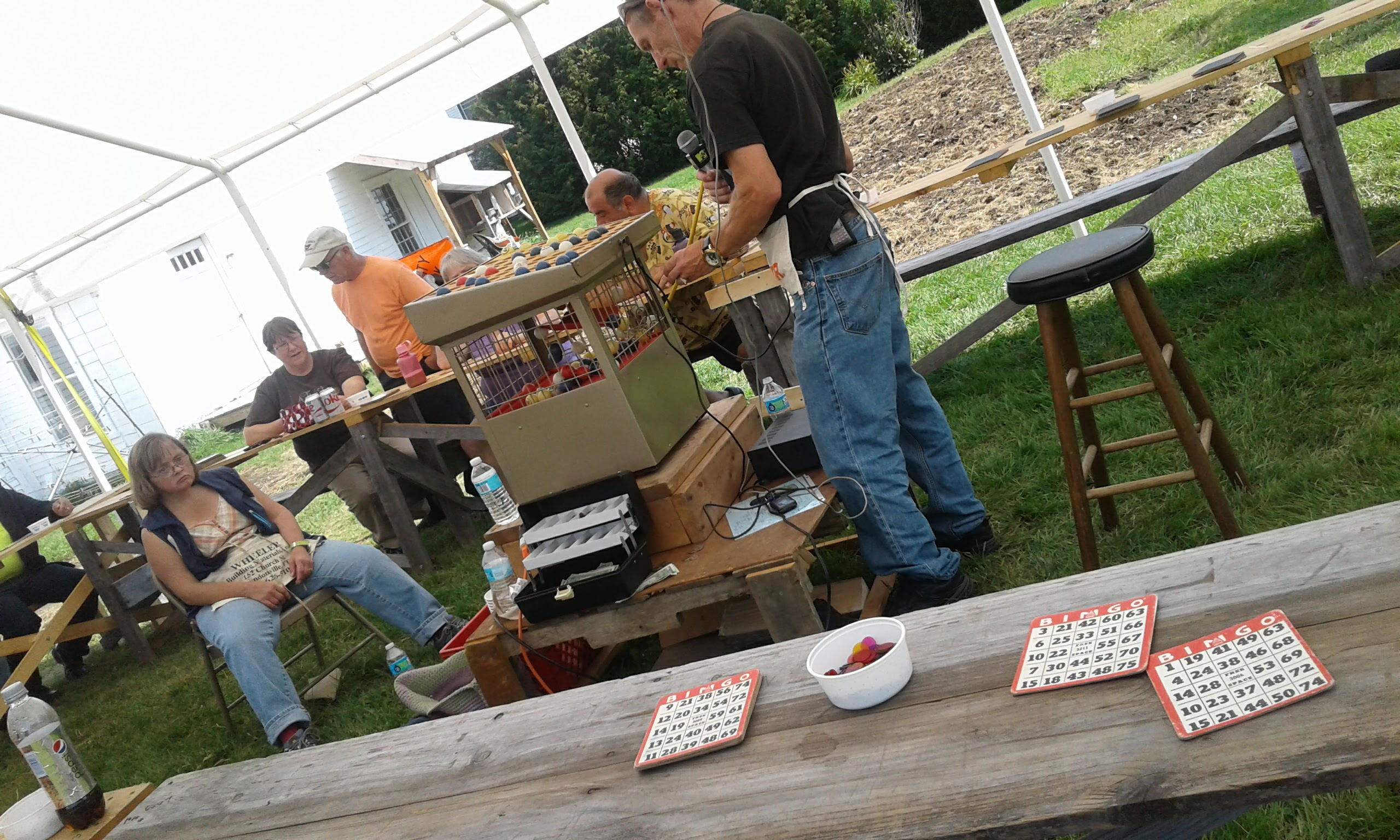
Bingo game on Labor Day in Sheffield, Vermont, 2017

Single games often have multiple bingos; for example, the players first play for a single line; after that, play goes on until a full card is called; then, play continues for a consolation full card.

Players often play multiple cards for each game. Because of the large number of cards played by each player, most halls have the players sit at tables to which they often fasten their cards with adhesive tape. To mark cards faster the players usually use special markers called daubers. At commercial halls, after calling the number the caller then displays the next number on a television monitor; bingo cannot be called until that number is called aloud.

Bingo is often used as an instructional tool in American schools and in teaching English as a foreign language in many countries. Typically, the numbers are replaced with beginning reader words, pictures, or unsolved math problems. Custom bingo creation programs now allow teachers and parents to create bingo cards using their own content.

=== Terminology ===
Ready/waiting/cased/set/down/pat/open; has a shot/chance
Describes a player who only needs one number in order to complete the bingo pattern.
Breaking the bubble or "possible"
The bubble is the minimum number of balls required to complete the bingo pattern. This is the earliest point any player could have a valid bingo. For standard bingo games, at least one number in each column or four/five numbers in a single column need to be called for a bingo to be possible.
Jumping the gun/premature bingo/social error/bongo
One who calls bingo before having a valid bingo. The most common situation is someone calling bingo using the next number in the screen before it has been called.

False alarm or just practicing
A tongue-in-cheek term used when one calls bingo but is mistaken. This could be because of mishearing the caller or stamping the wrong number by mistake. Someone who calls a "falsie" genuinely believes that they have a bingo.

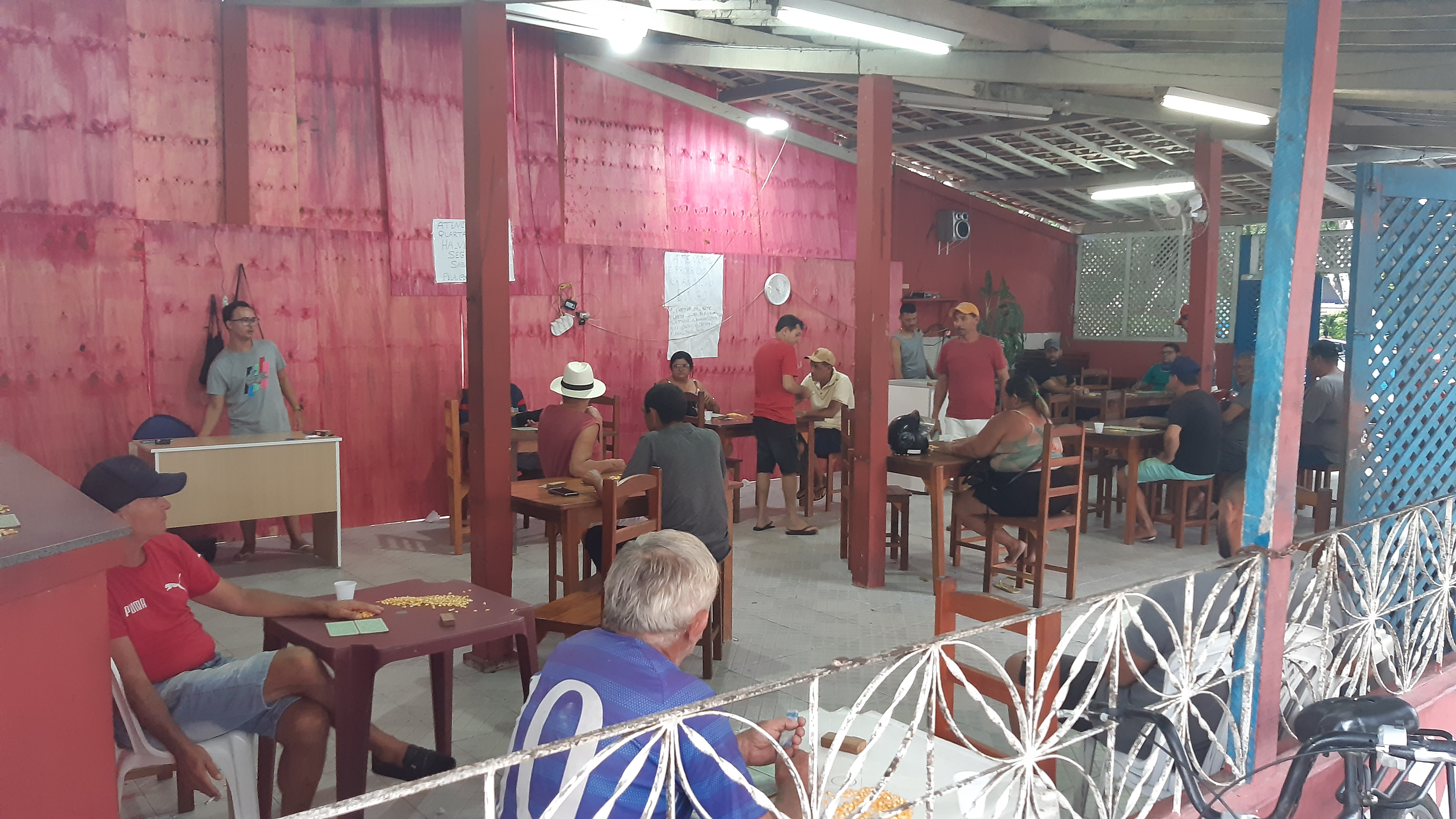
A form of bingo being played in Itabaiana, state of Sergipe, Brazil where players gather corn kernels to mark the value of numbers that have been called

Wild numbers
Many bingo halls will have certain games with a wild number. Wild numbers allow bingo players to start with multiple called numbers. Typically, the first ball drawn is the determining factor.

Standard
All numbers ending with the second digit of the first number. Example: First ball is 22. All numbers ending in a 2 including B2 is considered a called number.
Forwards/backwards
All numbers beginning or ending with the wild number. Example: First ball is 22. All numbers beginning or ending with a 2 is considered a called number. If the first number ends with an 8, 9, or 0, another number may be drawn as there are no numbers starting with an 8 or 9 and only 9 numbers starting with a 0. Some halls will also redraw a number ending with a 7 as there are only six numbers beginning with a 7.

Hard-way bingo
A bingo pattern in a straight line without the use of the free space.
Reach
In Japan, a player will yell "Reach" when they are one space away from a bingo.

== Business ==
In the United States, bingo games are commonly organized by churches or charity organizations, with their legality and stakes varying by state regulation. Bingo halls in some states are rented out to sponsoring organizations, and these halls often host games almost daily. Church-run games, on the other hand, are typically weekly events held on church premises. These games are usually played for modest stakes, although the final game of a session often features a coverall game with a larger jackpot prize for winning within a certain quantity of numbers called. A progressive jackpot is one that may increase per session until it is won.

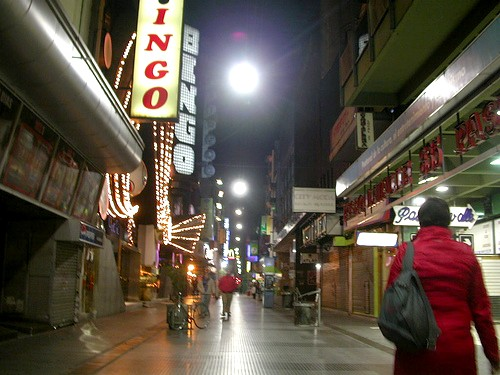
Bingo parlors in Buenos Aires, Argentina, 2017

Commercial bingo games in the US are primarily offered by casinos (only in the state of Nevada) and Native American bingo halls, which are often located in the same venue as Native American-run casinos. In Nevada, bingo is mainly offered by casinos catering to local gamblers, rather than the famous tourist resorts. They typically offer one-hour sessions on the odd hours, such as 9 am, 11 am, and 1 pm daily, usually from 9 am to 11 pm, with relatively modest stakes except for coverall jackpots. Most bingo parlors in Las Vegas use handheld machines for the games.

Native American games usually offer only one or two sessions a day and are often played for higher stakes than charity games to attract players from distant places. Some also offer a special progressive jackpot game that may link players from multiple bingo halls.

In both Canada and the United States, some gay bars and other LGBT-oriented organizations host bingo events, often combined with a drag show and marketed as "Drag Bingo" or "Drag Queen Bingo". "Drag Bingo" events originated in Seattle in the early 1990s as a fundraiser for local HIV/AIDS charities. They have since expanded to many other cities across North America, supporting a diverse range of charities.

Cheektowaga, New York, with one bingo hall for every 6,800 residents, is believed to have the highest concentration of bingo halls in the United States. The suburb of Buffalo's large Polish-American Catholic population is thought to be a factor in bingo's significant popularity in Western New York, which has five times as many bingo halls per capita as the rest of the state.

== Electronic ==
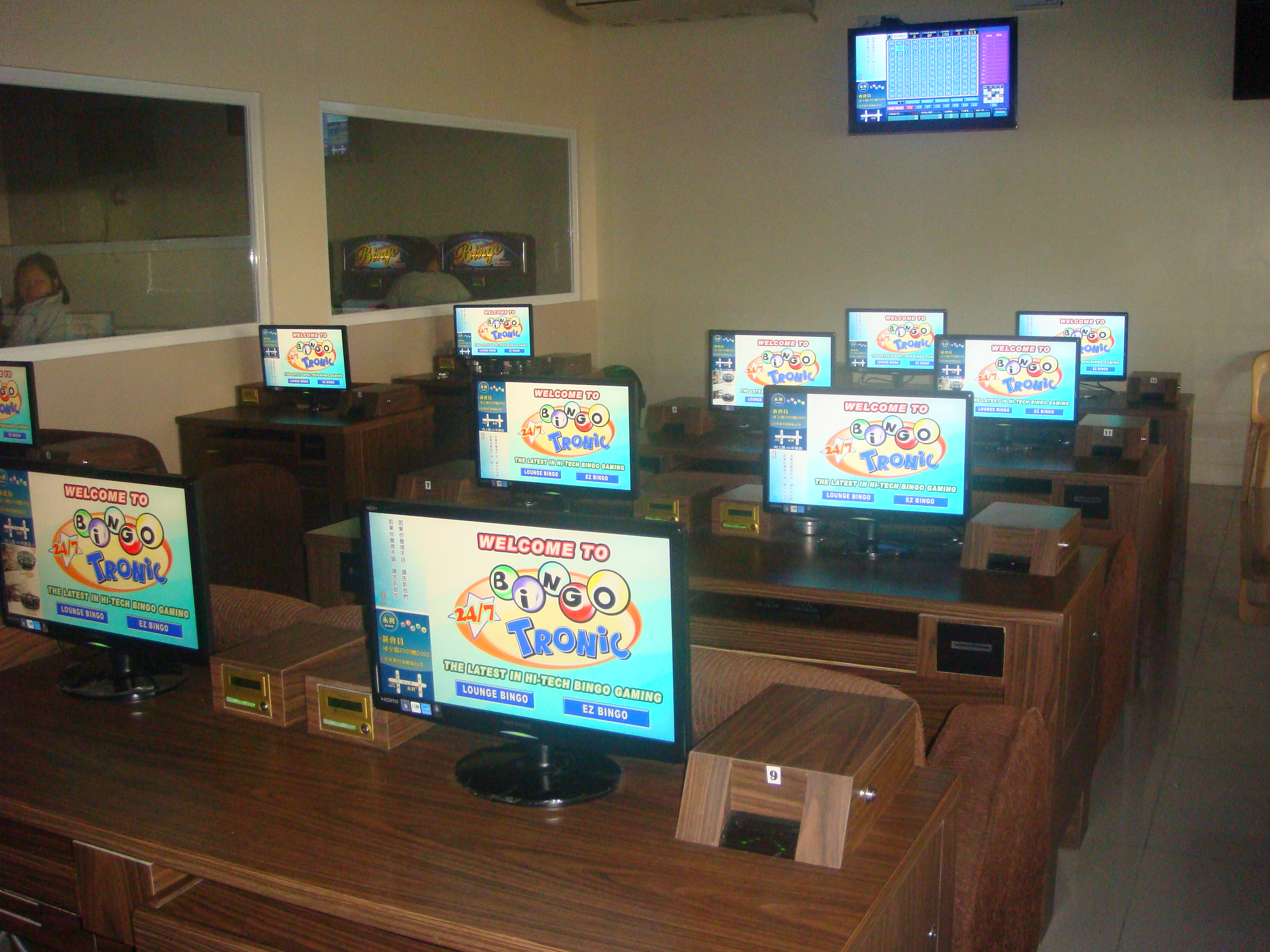
Bingo-Tronic machines in a computerized bingo parlor, 2012

The advent of computer technology in bingo has blurred the lines between traditional slot machines and bingo slot machines. To the average person, bingo-based slot machines are physically indistinguishable from an RNG based slot machine typically seen in Atlantic City or Las Vegas. These devices are commonly called Class II machines, because the federal Indian Gaming Regulatory Act separated bingo, including electronic and mechanical aids, where players play against each other, from Class III slot machines, where players play against the house.

As a result of the passage of SB1180 in 2017, the State of Arizona now allows technological aids for bingo games that function only as an electronic substitute for bingo cards. These technological aids are not defined by Arizona law or regulation, but one such electronic technological aid consists of a system which includes a network linking player interfaces to a number drawing device (ball-draw server) and an electronic substitute for a "live" cashier. The player interfaces themselves do not contain random number generators or allow a player to directly deposit cash. Rather, the Arizona technological aid system allows a player to deposit money into a unique individual player's account, pay for the games played out of that account, and at the end of play redeposit the value of any unused games that the player may have purchased or won back into that account. The system does not allow the player to print a redemption ticket or receive anything of value directly from the player interface.

Music bingo is growing in popularity and is finding its way into bars, pubs, and other events as bingo is already a familiar concept and when integrated with music, also results in fun and collaboration among players (singing along to the songs that are randomly played). It was introduced as a game show in 1958 and continues to expand today.

== Game shows ==
- Lingo, a game show incorporating Bingo mechanics and five-letter words
- Pinoy Bingo Night, a game show in the Philippines with Kris Aquino on ABS-CBN.
- Bingo America, a bingo-based viewer-participation game show on GSN
- National Bingo Night, a bingo-based viewer participation game show on ABC that ended in 2007
- Bingo Blitz, a game show on GSN based on the mobile game of the same name

== See also ==
- Slingo, an online game that blends slots and bingo
- Bingo (card game)
- Keno
- Lotería
- Lottery
- Online bingo, Bingo played on the Internet
- Pakapoo
- Screeno, Bingo played by movie audience members
