= Foxy Bingo =

Online bingo site

- Industry: Gambling / Online Bingo
- Headquarters: One New Change, London, UK
- Areas served: UK
- Parent: Entain PLC
- Website: https://www.foxybingo.com

Foxy Bingo is an English online bingo site that launched in 2005. The brand is owned by Cashcade which is one of the gambling brands owned by Entain PLC (LSE: ENT), a constituent of the FTSE 100 index.

== History ==
Foxy Bingo was founded in 2005 with two bingo and chat rooms by UK-based online gambling company, Cashcade. In July 2009, Cashcade was bought by PartyGaming. In 2011 PartyGaming merged with bwin Interactive Entertainment AG to form bwin.party Digital Entertainment.

In September 2015, bwin.party was bought by GVC Holdings. Foxy Bingo's sister site, Foxy Casino, was also launched in 2015. In 2019 Foxy Casino was relaunched as Foxy Games.

== Marketing ==
Celebrities associated with the brand include British television personality Katie Price between 2006 and 2008, and stars of the reality TV show The Only Way Is Essex, Joey Essex and Lauren Goodger (with her boyfriend Jake McLean), in 2015. The voice of the Foxy Bingo mascot is Adam Catterall.

The site rebranded in March 2017 using the American actress Heather Graham as the new face of a £10 million marketing campaign.

== Sponsorship and partnerships ==
Foxy Bingo has had many sponsorship deals such as:

- On 11 July 2011, Foxy Bingo sponsored both Smooth Radio's weekday afternoon show with David Jensen, and Real Radio's evening show with David Heane for 13 weeks
- Foxy Bingo sponsored The Jeremy Kyle Show, a tabloid talk show on ITV presented by Jeremy Kyle, from February 2008 to March 2017.

== Charity and community contributions ==
- 2014 'Think Pink' charity campaign
- 2014 Super League Grand Final
- 2016 Sue Ryder Mascot World Cup
