= Kenny Alexander (businessman) =

Scottish businessman (born 1969)

- Born: Kenneth Jack Alexander; April 1969 (age 57); Kilwinning, Ayrshire, Scotland
- Education: University of Glasgow
- Occupation: Businessman
- Title: Former CEO, GVC Holdings
- Term: 2007-2020
- Successor: Shay Segev
- Spouse: Caroline Alexander

Kenneth Jack Alexander (born April 1969) is a Scottish businessman who was chief executive (CEO) of GVC Holdings, a gambling company based in the Isle of Man, from 2007 to 2020.

== Early life ==
Alexander was born in Ayrshire, Scotland, grew up in North Ayrshire and earned a bachelor's degree in accountancy from the University of Glasgow.

== Career ==
In 1991, he joined the accountants Grant Thornton, where he worked for five years and qualified as a chartered accountant. In 1996, he joined Hazlewood Foods as a financial controller.

In 2000, he joined Sportingbet, having seen the job advertised in the Racing Post, and by 2007 had risen to become head of its European operations.

Alexander became CEO of GVC in 2007, when it was listed on AIM and valued at £26 million.

In February 2016, he concluded the £1.1 billion reverse takeover of GVC's larger competitor Bwin.Party Digital Entertainment.

In April 2017, it was speculated that Alexander and GVC were looking to take over the bookmakers William Hill.

In December 2017, it was announced that GVC would take over the bookmakers Ladbrokes Coral for up to £4 billion, with Alexander as CEO, and a likely FTSE 100 index entry.

In July 2020, it was announced that Alexander would retire, to be succeeded as chief executive by Shay Segev, the chief operating officer. The Guardian called it a "surprise departure".

== Personal life ==
He is married to Caroline Alexander, and lives with his family in Perth, Scotland. Before his retirement in 2020, he was based in London during the week.

His hobbies include no-limit cash poker, and when he worked at Sportingbet, considered becoming a professional gambler, about which his wife was "horrified". He owns a string of racehorses, including star mare Honeysuckle, and bets every day, either on horses or football.

In May 2021, he was convicted of taking and driving away a vehicle without the owner's consent, drink driving and driving without insurance.
