= DAZN =

British sports streaming platform

DAZN Group Limited

- Screenshot Screenshot of the app
- Website type: Subsidiary
- Available in: Chinese, Dutch, English, French, German, Italian, Japanese, Portuguese and Spanish
- Founded: September 2007; 19 years ago (as Perform Group); 8 July 2015; 11 years ago (as DAZN)
- Headquarters: Hammersmith, London, England
- Area served: 200+ countries and territories (Note: Except China, Crimea, Iran, North Korea, Russia, and Syria.)
- Owner: Access Industries
- CEO: Shay Segev
- Key people: Darren Waterman (CFO); Sandeep Tiku (CTO)
- Industry: Internet television, sports broadcasting, sports journalism
- Revenue: £2,884.1 million (2025)
- Operating income: −£713.3 million (2025)
- Net income: −£743.6 million (2025)
- Employees: 3,200
- Subsidiaries: DAZN Bet; Team Whistle; Foxtel
- Website: DAZN
- IPv6 support: Yes
- Launched: 10 August 2016

DAZN (/dəˈzoʊn/; pronounced "da zone") is a British global over-the-top entertainment platform primarily offering sports streaming. Founded in 2007 known as Perform Group via the merger of Premium TV Limited and Inform Group, it is owned by Access Industries, the investment group founded by Sir Len Blavatnik, and is headquartered in London. Shay Segev is DAZN's CEO as of January 2021. The non-executive directors are Lincoln Benet, John Gleasure, Guillaume D’Hauteville, Andrew Cramer, and Danny Townsend. Cramer's and Townsend's appointments followed DAZN's acquisition of Foxtel and Surj Sports $1 billion investment in DAZN respectively.

The DAZN platform was founded in 2015, and states it broadcasts live and on-demand sport in over 200 countries and territories worldwide. DAZN holds key domestic broadcast rights in Belgium, Germany, Italy, Japan, Portugal, Spain, and Taiwan. It is considered Europe's largest digital sports broadcaster, with over 75 programming rights. As of 2024, DAZN claimed to be approaching 20 million paid subscribers globally. DAZN is the primary streaming service to watch live football in Europe.

Outside of streaming, DAZN has expanded into in-play betting, gaming, e-commerce, merchandise, and ticketing with being originally involved in content distribution, subscription, advertising and sponsorship, and technology and production and also owns a significant minority stake in the leading football portal Goal after TPG's Integrated Media Company (IMC) acquired a majority stake in 2020.

== History ==
=== Formation and launch of the DAZN platform (2007–2018) ===
Perform Group was created in 2007 through the merger of Premium TV Limited, an event sport broadcasting network, and the Inform Group, a digital sports rights agency.

In February 2011, Perform acquired Goal.com. In 2011 and 2013 the company bought sports data companies RunningBall and Opta Sports respectively.

In 2013, Perform Group combined its U.S. businesses with The Sporting News to form Sporting News Media, in which it took a 65% stake. The Sporting News' former owner American City Business Journals retained 35%.

Perform Group was de-listed from the London Stock Exchange in November 2014 when Access Industries increased its stake in the company from 42.5% to 77%.

In December 2014, Perform and the WTA announced a 10-year media deal, under which they would jointly form WTA Media to manage and distribute its media rights. In February 2016, Perform Group and the FIBA announced a partnership to distribute and sell broadcasting rights to its basketball competitions.

In February 2016, Perform Group announced its acquisition of exclusive worldwide media rights to Japanese J.League football under a 10-year, ¥210 billion (US$2 billion) contract, succeeding the league's ¥5 billion deal with SKY Perfect. Under the new contract, all matches from the three J.League divisions (J1, J2, and J3) would be broadcast under its new DAZN brand from 2017. The league described the contract as the largest broadcast rights deal in the history of Japanese sport. In March 2023, DAZN extended its deal with J.League to 2033.

In August 2016, Perform Group launched DAZN in Austria, Germany, Japan and Switzerland. It was described by media at the time as being the "Netflix for sport".

In July 2017, DAZN announced that it would expand into Canada, after having acquired over-the-top streaming rights to the National Football League in Canada, including NFL Game Pass and access to NFL RedZone. In August 2017, the company reached a deal to sublicense content from beIN Sports Canada, including selected UEFA Champions League and UEFA Europa League matches, as well as other international sports rights. On 20 November 2017, DAZN acquired Canadian rights to International Basketball Federation (FIBA) events.

In February 2018, DAZN sub-licensed Japanese rights to the B.League, Nippon Professional Baseball, La Liga, and the Premier League from Softbank.

In February 2018, DAZN acquired Canadian broadcast rights to the 2018 Commonwealth Games and subsumed Major League Soccer's digital out-of-market service MLS Live — with live and on-demand streaming of matches featuring U.S. teams. Roku support was also added that month. In March, DAZN reached a syndication deal to carry content from Pac-12 Network on the service in Canada.

In May 2018, DAZN announced that it had acquired exclusive Canadian rights to the UEFA Champions League and Europa League, beginning in the 2018–19 season and replacing TSN. In April 2019, DAZN announced that it had acquired Canadian rights to the Premier League, replacing Sportsnet and TSN, under a three-year deal.

=== US expansion, combat sports launch and corporate restructure (2018) ===
In May 2018, DAZN announced its expansion into the United States and the signing of a broadcasting deal with Matchroom Boxing. The deal with Matchroom was signed for an initial two years with the option for a six-year extension. Matchroom's Chairman, Eddie Hearn, said that the deal was a "groundbreaking deal in the history of boxing".

In the same month, former ESPN president John Skipper joined as executive chairman of Perform Group. He later became the first chief executive officer of DAZN.

In June 2018, DAZN announced a five-year streaming rights deal with the Viacom-owned mixed martial arts promotion Bellator and included the U.S. and all other regions currently served by DAZN. The rights include seven exclusive events per-year, as well as all events televised by Paramount Network.

DAZN officially launched in the U.S. in September 2018, ahead of its first boxing event of Anthony Joshua vs Alexander Povetkin on 22 September. Its launch content also included the World Boxing Super Series, as well as the AFC Champions League, the Chilean Primera Division, J-League and other content. DAZN's broadcast team for its U.S. boxing events is led by "Sugar" Ray Leonard and Brian Kenny on play-by-play, with LZ Granderson as ringside reporter, and Michael Buffer as ring announcer. Buffer appeared in a U.S. marketing campaign for the service, contrasting its business model to pay-per-views.

In September 2018, DAZN's parent company Perform Group underwent a reorganization, with its sports data business spun into a second company known as Perform Content (which was later sold to Vista Equity Partners and merged with STATS LLC in 2019 to form Stats Perform, and its consumer properties (including DAZN itself, as well as several co-owned sports news websites) retained as DAZN Group and was later reported that this was in preparation for a potential sale of the latter in order to help fund the DAZN operations.

In October 2018, DAZN announced that it had signed a five-year, 11-fight deal with Mexican boxer Canelo Álvarez valued at a minimum of $365 million, beginning with his then-upcoming bout against Rocky Fielding in December for the WBA super middleweight title. Álvarez was previously aligned with HBO, which had announced that it would discontinue boxing broadcasts. The contract overtook Giancarlo Stanton's $325 million contract with the Miami Marlins as the highest-valued contract with a single athlete in sport known at the time.

In November 2018, Major League Baseball announced a three-year content partnership with DAZN, which includes on-demand highlights, and ChangeUp—a live nightly studio program featuring look-ins and analysis. Just before the start of the 2020 season, DAZN cancelled MLB-related programming due to financial stresses caused by the COVID-19 pandemic.

In December 2018, DAZN was estimated to be worth £3 billion: it was described by the Evening Standard as one of the United Kingdom's few tech "unicorns".

=== European and Asian launch (2018–2020) ===
DAZN launched in Italy in August 2018, with an acquisition of exclusive rights to 114 Serie A matches beginning in the 2018–19 season and other domestic rights on launch including the European Rugby Champions Cup, Showtime Championship Boxing, UFC programming, and the World Rally Championship. In September, DAZN announced that in order to improve the accessibility of its Serie A rights, it would begin to offer a subscription-based linear channel on Sky Italia's satellite service.

In January 2019, DAZN acquired the rights to broadcast the 2019 AFC Asian Cup in Canada and the United States. In March 2019, DAZN doubled its U.S. monthly cost, but also introduced a new yearly option at a discount.

DAZN launched in Spain in February 2019, becoming its eighth market. The service went live with a roster of exclusive premium sport content including MotoGP, Moto 2 and Moto3 (2019–2022), EuroLeague, EuroCup and Premier League. Other rights included FA Cup, EFL Cup, Coppa Italia and Supercoppa Italiana, EFL Championship, UFC, Golden Boy, Matchroom Boxing and PDC Darts.

On 8 March 2019, DAZN signed a three-year, six-fight deal with Gennady Golovkin, under which it would broadcast two fights per-year. The contract also includes two cards per-year from Golovkin's GGG Promotions beginning in 2020. The deal began with his June 2019 bout against Canadian boxer Steve Rolls. Golovkin's promoter explained that the choice of a Canadian boxer was intended to help encourage DAZN subscriptions in the country. Golovkin cited the broadcaster's "global vision" as an influence on the decision. On 13 March 2019, DAZN re-organised the Perform Media division into DAZN Media with handling of advertising and sponsorship sales for DAZN's global operations, including the "DAZN+" program (which coordinates "personalised communications" between its partners and subscribers), and DAZN Player (formerly ePlayer), the group's syndicated video content service.

In April 2019, DAZN premiered a new show, Da Pull Up, hosted by Akin "Ak" Reyes and Barak Bess, and premiered the first episode of 40 Days - docuseries chronicling the lead-up to Canelo Álvarez's bout against Daniel Jacobs.

In May 2019, the service announced an expansion into Brazil as its ninth market, acquiring rights to the Copa Sudamericana and Campeonato Brasileiro Série C, and other international football competitions among other properties.

In July 2019, DAZN also reached a syndication deal with Eurosport in Austria, Germany, Italy, and Spain, allowing DAZN subscribers to access live and on-demand sports programming from Eurosport in these regions. In addition, DAZN sub-licensed 45 Bundesliga matches from Eurosport in Germany and Austria over the next two seasons — with 39 exclusive to the service.

In July 2019, former Indianapolis Colts punter and WWE personality Pat McAfee signed a content deal with DAZN, which added television simulcasts of his podcast and The Pat McAfee Show to the service, as well as contributions to shoulder content for DAZN's NFL rights. DAZN and McAfee terminated their broadcast partnership in May 2020.

=== Global launch and appointment of Shay Segev (2020–2021) ===
In March 2020, DAZN announced that it would expand into 200 additional countries worldwide, with an initial focus on giving wider distribution to its boxing and original content portfolio.

With the COVID-19 pandemic resulting in widespread suspension of international sport, DAZN stated in late March 2020 that it would not pay rightsholders for content that had not been delivered under their contracts. In May 2020, the Financial Times reported that DAZN was seeking further investments in order to secure the future of the business, which had been affected by the COVID-19 pandemic.

In September 2020, DAZN extended their carriage agreement with Eurosport through August 2023, and added Switzerland to the agreement.

In October 2020, it reached a deal to sell stakes in Goal, Spox, VoetbalZone to Integrated Media Company (IMC), a portfolio of TPG Capital, and in December 2020 it sold Sporting News to PAX Holdings.

In January 2021, former Entain CEO Shay Segev was named the new CEO of DAZN, after having acted alongside founder James Rushton for the previous six months.

In March 2021, former Walt Disney Direct-to-Consumer & International executive Kevin A. Mayer became the chairman of DAZN, replacing John Skipper. That month, DAZN secured the exclusive broadcasting rights of Serie A TIM in Italy and LaLiga rights in Spain.

DAZN announced a five-year agreement with Matchroom Sport in June 2021. It also announced a four-year global broadcasting deal for the UEFA Women's Champions League (outside of China, the Middle East, and North Africa) under which it will partner with YouTube to simulcast 61 matches during the 2021–22 and 2022–23 seasons.

In July 2021, the company agreed an eight-year deal for the rights of Japan's Women Empowerment League.

In October 2021, DAZN launched its proprietary video player, Mercury.

In November 2021, the company launched DAZN X, its innovation hub. In December 2021, DAZN was awarded the 2021 Apple TB App of the Year award.

=== Diversification, continued expansions (2022–2024) ===
In 2022, DAZN began diversifying its platform beyond sports streaming to include a range of other sports entertainment, including the sale of tickets and merchandise, sports non-fungible tokens (NFTs), gaming and betting.

DAZN Moments launched on 24 March 2022, however, DAZN would later published a notice on their dedicated website stating that the service would be terminated on 30 November 2023, with no further purchases or sales available. DAZN Moments would no longer be held by customers after 14 March 2024. DAZN's NFTs launched in tandem with the Canelo Álvarez vs. Billy Joe Saunders fight reportedly failed to generate a profit.

In April 2022, DAZN launched "DAZN Bet" in the UK and signed a strategic partnership with Pragmatic Group to develop its sports betting product. Shay Segev, Dazn CEO, said: "The convergence of sports media and betting is the future.”

In May 2022, DAZN signed a deal to carry Red Bull TV, including live and on-demand content. That same month, DAZN signed a four-event deal with KSI's Misfits Boxing, carrying cards under the branding "MF & DAZN: X Series".

In June 2022, DAZN announced a global broadcasting deal with British boxer Anthony Joshua, beginning with his 20 August rematch against Oleksandr Usyk in Saudi Arabia. The deal was reported to be valued at £100 million per year, with Joshua also becoming a brand ambassador for DAZN.

In July 2022, Segev stated that there were plans to add more interactive features to the platform, such as "watch parties", alternative broadcasts of events, and sports betting integration.

In August 2022, DAZN and Misfits Boxing launched "MF & DAZN: X Series", which is a series of crossover boxing events that have influencers and celebrities complete in the boxing ring.

In September 2022, DAZN announced that it would acquire sports broadcaster Eleven Group, expanding its position in parts of Asia and Europe, and in global sports streaming rights and technologies. The acquisition was later finalized in February 2023. Details of the acquisition were included in DAZN Group's published accounts, stating that Eleven was acquired on a share-only basis, while £35m in funding was provided to Eleven subject to an annual interest rate of 14%.

In 2022, the company launched DAZN Store in Germany, its online e-commerce platform for fan merchandise. That same year, DAZN reported revenues of $2.3 billion, over 70% increase from 2021, making it the highest grossing sports app in the world.

In January 2023, DAZN signed a five-year deal with Misfits Boxing, and a multi-year agreement with All Elite Wrestling (AEW) to carry its programming in 42 Asian and European territories. In February 2023, DAZN announced that it had acquired the global rights to the NFL's Game Pass service outside of the U.S. and China under a 10-year deal beginning in the 2023 NFL season; it will be sold as a standalone subscription service on the DAZN platform.

In January 2023, DAZN and Amazon agreed a global distribution deal for DAZN's streaming service on Amazon's Prime Video Channels platform.

In March 2023, DAZN Chairman Kevin A. Mayer two-year term came to an end. That month, DAZN also launched the DAZN 1 channel on Sky in the UK and Ireland.

In May 2023, DAZN launched two new global FAST channels, DAZN Combat and DAZN Women's Football, which will be available globally through LG, Samsung TV Plus and VIDAA. In July 2023 DAZN announced a partnership with DAIMANI to launch an integrated ticketing product for DAZN subscribers. The same month, it also launched in Belgium, Portugal, and Taiwan, transitioning from former Eleven Sports services.

In August 2023, it was announced DAZN had acquired US-based women's football streaming platform ATA Football. DAZN also launched in France, with the company reaching a sub-licensing agreement with Canal+ to stream weekly Ligue 1 fixtures on the service, and offer carriage of a DAZN 1 linear channel for Canal+ customers. DAZN also announced a five-year partnership with U.S. sports merchandise retailer Fanatics, Inc.

=== Saudi investments, acquisition of Foxtel (2024–present) ===
In October 2024, DAZN reached an agreement with Saudi Arabia's General Entertainment Authority, giving it exclusive rights (co-exclusive within the MENA region) to Riyadh Season events, and international rights outside of MENA for its slate of boxing events. The agreement came amid rumours that the Saudi Public Investment Fund (PIF) was seeking to acquire a stake in DAZN; the PIF stated that it "has no current plans to invest in the company". In December 2024, DAZN acquired exclusive international rights to the 2025 FIFA Club World Cup, with all matches streaming for free. DAZN also reached sub-licensing agreements with TNT Sports and TUDN to hold U.S. linear television rights to the tournament in English and Spanish respectively, as well as co-produce studio programming. In November 2024, the company announced a deal with Frank Warren's Queensberry Promotions to broadcast its boxing events on the platform, succeeding its previous pact with TNT Sports (UK).

In December 2024, DAZN announced that it would acquire Australian pay television provider Foxtel from News Corp Australia and Telstra in a AU$3.4 billion deal. The sale, among other assets, gave DAZN control of Foxtel's Fox Sports networks and Hubbl streaming business, which includes competing OTT service Kayo Sports. The acquisition was completed on 2 April 2025 following the approval of the Australian Competition and Consumer Commission and Foreign Investment Review Board; DAZN stated that it would maintain the Foxtel name and its related brands. As part of the sale, News Corp and Telstra acquired 6% and 3% stakes in DAZN respectively.

In February 2025, it was reported that Surj Sports Investment, the sporting arm of Saudi Arabia's Public Investment Fund, had agreed to invest $1 billion in DAZN for a stake of less than 5%. The deal was concluded weeks after DAZN, whose losses have exceeded $1 billion annually since 2019, secured the rights to broadcast the 2025 FIFA Club World Cup, and FIFA awarded the hosting rights for the 2034 FIFA World Cup to Saudi Arabia as the sole bidder for the tournament.

In March 2025, DAZN announced a rights agreement for the Saudi-backed LIV Golf covering 200 territories, with exclusive rights in Austria, Belgium, Canada, France, Germany, Italy, Japan, Portugal and Switzerland; this agreement will see DAZN host the league's FAST platform LIV Golf+, and develop a paid offering.

In June 2025, DAZN sublicensed the Spanish-language rights to 38 UEFA Champions League matches in the United States per-season from TelevisaUnivision; the package also includes Europa League matches, and simulcast rights for two quarter finals, the semi-finals, and final. Most of these matches had originally been assigned to its own streaming service Vix. The agreement lasts through 2027, when TelevisaUnivision's contract expires; DAZN had sub-licensed U.S. Spanish television rights to the FIFA Club World Cup to TelevisaUnivision.

On 30 July 2025, DAZN announced an agreement with the National Hockey League (NHL) to move its international streaming service NHL.tv to DAZN beginning in the 2025–26 NHL season, as either part of the DAZN service or as an add-on subscription. The agreement covers around 200 countries, and succeeds a previous relationship between the league and Sportradar; it excludes territories where the NHL has existing media rights deals, including Canada, the United States, and Nordic Europe.

In September 2025, DAZN announced agreements with ESPN International to carry ESPN College Football and ESPN College Basketball broadcasts in parts of Europe, MENA, the Philippines, and the United Kingdom; the package includes up to 20 football games and 25 basketball games per-week, including rights to the College Football Playoff and the NCAA men's and women's basketball tournaments (whose international rights are held by ESPN). As part of this agreement, the games would initially be streamed on DAZN's free tier. In October 2025, DAZN expanded its NCAA coverage by signing a deal with the Big Ten Conference.

In December 2025, FIFA moved its streaming service FIFA+ exclusively to DAZN.

In February 2026, DAZN announced a five-year extension of its agreement with Matchroom Boxing to 2031. As part of the extension, DAZN will broadcast 30 boxing events by Matchroom a year. In March 2026, DAZN announced a six-year agreement with FIBA and Two Circles to move streaming platform Courtside 1891 to DAZN as a standalone offer. In April 2026, DAZN secured UEFA Champions League broadcast rights in Austria.

In June 2026, DAZN announced an agreement to carry Latin American sports network DSports (formerly DirecTV Sports) on its platform in Chile, Colombia, Ecuador, Peru and Uruguay; the agreement came ahead of the 2026 FIFA World Cup, which DAZN also held rights to in Italy, Japan, and Spain.

In July 2026, DAZN renewed broadcast rights for MotoGP in Spain until 2030 and gained exclusive broadcast rights for MotoGP in Portugal until 2031. On 31 July, DAZN announced a global broadcast rights partnership with British MMA promotion Fightstar Championship. In August 2026, DAZN renewed its rights to the Premier League in Spain and Portugal through 2031 In August 2026, DAZN announced it secured LaLiga rights for the next 3 seasons in Sub-Saharan Africa.

In September 2026, DAZN acquired global broadcast rights to the 2026 Ballon d’Or Awards ceremony. In September 2026, DAZN extended its broadcast partnership with Formula 1 in Spain, Andorra and Portugal until 2030.. In September 2026, DAZN acquired Latin American basketball streaming service Basket.tv. In November 2026, DAZN announced it partnered with Skydance, to bundle DAZN with HBO Max for DAZN Family plan subscribers in Italy. In November 2026, DAZN acquired the global broadcast rights to National Rugby League(Australia and New Zealand Rugby League).

==== U.S. expansion and regional sports ====
In 2026, DAZN began to make a number of investments to expand its presence in the U.S. market; in April 2026, DAZN acquired ViewLift, a U.S. streaming provider founded by Ted Leonsis that primarily provides streaming services for regional sports networks and teams as NESN, the Vegas Golden Knights, and Leonsis's Monumental Sports & Entertainment and Monumental Sports Network.

In May 2026, DAZN expressed interest in acquiring the regional rights to all or some of the 13 NBA teams formerly served by FanDuel Sports Network (which wound down amid financial difficulties after an agreement to be sold to DAZN fell through), and possibly participate in the NBA's proposed in-market "streaming hub" to aggregate regional broadcasters. In July 2026, DAZN acquired Gotham Advanced Media and Entertainment, a DTC venture of New York's MSG Networks and YES Network; their joint Gotham Sports App was discontinued, with both networks' DTC and TV Everywhere operations transitioning to DAZN beginning in the 2026–27 NHL season. In August 2026, in conjunction with its acquisition of ViewLift, DAZN announced that it would similarly offer Monumental Sports Network's DTC service Monumental+ via the platform.

On 26 August 2026, DAZN announced its acquisition of EverPass Media, a distributor of OTT sports broadcasts for out-of-home establishments, including NFL Sunday Ticket among others; the company will be renamed "DAZN for Business". DAZN had already worked with EverPass in the past, such as for the FIFA Club World Cup. As part of the acquisition, the NFL, RedBird, and TKO Group Holdings each received minority stakes in DAZN.

Ahead of the 2026–27 season, DAZN acquired the exclusive regional rights to five NBA teams: the Cleveland Cavaliers, Indiana Pacers, Memphis Grizzlies, Minnesota Timberwolves, and San Antonio Spurs; all five teams are carried via branded add-on subscriptions hosted by DAZN, with a limited slate of games airing for free on DAZN and/or broadcast television. All five teams were previously broadcast by FanDuel Sports Network The company reached similar deals with the Charlotte Hornets, Orlando Magic, and Detroit Pistons (whose games are primarily carried on broadcast television in conjunction with Cox Media Group and Scripps Sports), and the Los Angeles Kings of the NHL (in conjunction with ABTV).

DAZN's chief revenue officer Walker Jacobs acknowledged that the volatility in the regional sports network market (including the collapse of FanDuel Sports Network) had presented an opportunity for the company to broaden its U.S. operations (which, up until then, had largely focused on boxing), taking advantage of its global scale and synergies, giving the service wider promotion in conjunction with its regional sports packages, and being able to direct these new users towards DAZN's wider sports portfolio and original content (including synergies with content associated with its international broadcast rights, such as the NHL). He explained that "if the leagues decide that they want to find a single solution to create a national solution for local rights, we want to be the obvious choice for them to go with."

== Availability and access ==
The DAZN platform is available in over 200 countries globally. DAZN is available on most connected devices including digital media players, mobile apps, smart TVs, and PC.

DAZN is available as an Amazon Channel for Amazon Prime subscribers.

In September 2019, Comcast reached a deal with DAZN to offer an app for the service its Xfinity X1 cable boxes, becoming the first U.S. television provider to offer support for the service within their platform. In June 2025, DAZN and American competitor FuboTV announced a partnership, under which DAZN would provide a channel known as DAZN1 to carry its boxing and MMA events. DAZN1 would be sold by FuboTV as an add-on for its streaming television service, and as a standalone service. In turn, DAZN would carry Fubo's FAST channel Fubo Sports Network on its platform.

== Technical issues ==
The opening weekend of the J.League on DAZN saw multiple issues including buffering and other technical problems. Founder James Rushton would travel to Japan to make an in-person apology.

The Canadian launch was met with technical issues, including inconsistent stream qualities, buffering, and latency between the streams and television broadcasts. DAZN apologized for the "inadequate service" that it delivered and said it was working to rectify them. As a result, DAZN began to distribute NFL Sunday Ticket to television providers in October 2017, as had been the case before.

DAZN's broadcast of the Canelo Álvarez vs. Daniel Jacobs boxing fight on 4 May 2019 received numerous complaints for its streaming quality and claims of bias from the commentators.

In Spain, Orange S.A. sought a settlement after DAZN's technical failures prevented both the transmission of La Liga matches to Orange and Movistar; together with incurring additional infrastructure costs.

=== Serie A broadcast rights ===
In September 2021, Italian consumer group Codacons threatened a class action lawsuit against DAZN to revoke its broadcasting rights for Serie A football, after complaints of service blackouts. Italian telecommunications regulator AGCOM and the country's antitrust body opened investigations into the service. Italian undersecretary for sport Valentina Vezzali said: "We are monitoring the situation so that everything can be resolved for the benefit of the users, who are the ones who want to see their teams on television and cheer for their favorite team."

DAZN continued to suffer technical issues during the season opening day of Serie A in August 2022, and was condemned by multiple Italian politicians and Italy's consumer protection organization Udicon. AGCOM also intervened, leading to DAZN issuing an apology, and offering compensations to affected customers.

In January 2023, DAZN agreed to take urgent steps to improve its service in Italy, after its executives were called to a meeting with Italian government ministers Adolfo Urso and Andrea Abodi.

== Controversies ==
=== Business ethics ===
DAZN was sued by the German Federal Association of Consumer Organizations (VZBV) over the alleged use of non-transparent contract clauses that allowed DAZN to make excessive contractual changes, including price adjustments. The Munich I Regional Court largely agreed with the VZBV, upholding many of the complaints.

=== Crash and clash with the French football ===
Since the partial acquisition of Ligue 1 in 2024, DAZN has had to pay the LFP (association which manages professional football activities in France) nearly €300 million in three installments. This resulted in a television rights crisis and a refusal to pay two-thirds of the agreed sum, with the administrative process still ongoing. Following this, DAZN withdrew from the acquisition of Ligue 1 after just one year.

=== Belgian football ===
DAZN acquired the rights to the Belgian Jupiler Pro League, Challenger Pro League, Supercup and Lotto Super League in 2020. After renewing the deal for 5 more years, DAZN was not able to find a deal with a cable broadband service provider. This meant the competitions could only be watched through the DAZN app and website, an not on traditional linear TV. After 5 months into the new contract, it unilaterally decided the contract should be annulled because no deal was found with a distributor. Despite reacquiring the rights with a 10% decrease, it asked these providers for 30% more. DAZN stated that "no company can be forced to operate at a loss, it is simply not feasible". The company stated that it won't be paying the monthly installements any longer.

== Programming ==
In Spain, DAZN's coverage for the 2026–27 season includes five La Liga matches per matchweek across 35 of the competition's 38 matchweeks, with the remaining three matchweeks broadcast entirely by Movistar. DAZN also offers the entire Segunda División season.

== See also ==
- Eleven Sports
- ESPN+
- NBC Sports Gold
- GolfTV
- UFC Fight Pass
- WWE Network
- NBA League Pass
- NFL Game Pass
- Red Bull TV
- FITE TV
- FloSports
- OneSoccer
- List of streaming media services
