= Jette Nygaard-Andersen =

Danish business executive

- Born: 22 October 1968 (age 57)
- Education: University of Copenhagen
- Occupation: Businesswoman
- Title: former CEO, Entain
- Term: January 2021-December 2023
- Predecessor: Shay Segev
- Successor: Stella David
- Board member of: Coloplast A/S

Jette Nygaard-Andersen (born 22 October 1968) is a Danish businesswoman. She was chief executive officer of Entain Group from January 2021 to December 2023.

== Early life ==
Nygaard-Andersen was born on 22 October 1968 in Denmark. She has a master's degree in business, finance and economics from the University of Copenhagen. and attended executive programmes at INSEAD and Columbia University.

== Career ==
Nygaard-Andersen began her career at Maersk Group. She worked at Accenture as a senior strategy consultant for six years prior to joining Modern Times Group, an international media and entertainment group headquartered in Stockholm, Sweden in 2003.

She worked for Modern Times Group for 16 years, where she held a series of senior management positions in Stockholm, London and Copenhagen. She was CEO of MTG Digital Video Company (MTGx) between 2017 and 2019. She was CEO at MTG International Broadcasting for three years from 2015 to 2018, and was CEO of MTG Pay TV and Viasat, the international satellite operator.

In January 2021, she was appointed as chief executive officer of Entain, becoming the first female CEO of a UK-listed betting and gaming company. She stood down as CEO in December 2023, and was succeeded as interim CEO by Stella David.

== Other ==
Nygaard-Andersen is a non-executive director of Coloplast A/S, a multinational medical devices and services company.

She was a non-executive director at Entain between 2019 and 2021. She was chair and non-executive director at Astralis, a Danish esports organisation, between 2019 and 2020. She was named on Fortune's list of Most Powerful Women in 2023.
