= Cashcade =

UK-based online gambling marketing company

Cashcade Ltd
- Company type: Subsidiary
- Industry: Online gambling / Online bingo
- Founded: 2001 in London, UK
- Founders: Simon Collins and Patrick Southon
- Defunct: July 2009
- Fate: Acquired
- Successor: PartyGaming
- Headquarters: Douglas, Isle of Man
- Key people: Adele Lawton, Group Head of Bingo Brands
- Products: Foxy Bingo, Foxy Games, Cheeky Casino.
- Parent: Entain

Cashcade Ltd was a UK-based online gambling marketing company that was a pioneer in the introduction of the concept of ‘free bingo’, as well as the delivery of online bingo to the mass market. It went through several ownership changes and has been owned by gambling operator Entain since 2017.

== History ==
It was founded in 2001 by Simon Collins and Patrick Southon and was acquired by PartyGaming in July 2009.

The company subsequently became part of bwin.party digital entertainment plc in March 2011, following the merger of PartyGaming with bwin Interactive Entertainment AG

Cashcade's current parent company is now owned by the multinational online gambling operator, Entain, who took control of the business as part of its acquisition of Bwin.party and subsequently Cashcade in February 2016 following a competitive bidding process with 888 Holdings.

== Brands ==
Cashcade owns aseveral online bingo and casino brands, including Foxy Bingo, Foxy Casino and Cheeky Bingo.

=== Foxy Bingo ===
Foxy Bingo is an online bingo site that features a human-sized fox mascot called ‘Foxy’ whose identity remained anonymous until March 2017 when Heather Graham was revealed as the new face of the brand as part of a £10 million Marketing Campaign.

Foxy Bingo is Cashcade's flagship brand and was acquired by PartyGaming in 2009.

=== Foxy Games ===
Foxy Games was founded in April 2015 as Foxy Casino, and is the slots and live game room derivative of Foxy Bingo. The games hosted on the website aim to prioritise mobile use.

=== Cheeky Bingo ===
Cheeky Bingo was first established in 2009, where it won an awards for the ‘Best Newcomer’ and ‘Best Innovation’ at the 4th Annual Online Bingo Summit.

== Charity work ==
Cashcade has sponsored several charities including in 2009 being a lead partner for Red Nose Day other work includes Motor Neurone Disease Association, The Vision Charity and The Disability Foundation.
