= The Jeremy Kyle Show (American talk show) =

American syndicated talk show (2011–2013)

- Genre: Tabloid talk show
- Based on: The Jeremy Kyle Show (British series)
- Presented by: Jeremy Kyle
- Starring: Dr. Janet Taylor (guest support)
- Country of origin: United States
- Original language: English
- No. of seasons: 2
- No. of episodes: 300

Production
- Camera setup: Multiple
- Running time: 60 minutes
- Production companies: ITV Studios America; Debmar-Mercury

Original release
- Network: Broadcast syndication
- Release: September 19, 2011 – May 21, 2013

Related
- The Jeremy Kyle Show

The Jeremy Kyle Show is an American first-run syndicated talk show that was hosted by Jeremy Kyle. The show ran for two seasons from September 19, 2011, to May 21, 2013, in which it broadcast over 300 episodes. It was based on the British talk show of the same name, which was also hosted by Kyle.

The series was taped in New York. The program was a co-production of ITV Studios' U.S. subsidiary, ITV Studios America and Debmar-Mercury, which served as distributor for the American version while ITV kept all international rights.

== Synopsis ==
As with the British version, the series used a confrontational style, which saw guests attempt to resolve interpersonal relationship issues, such as family, relationship, sex, drug, alcohol and other issues. "Guest Support" was provided by psychiatrist Dr Janet Taylor.

The show's style was one of the reasons why Fox and Debmar-Mercury saw potential in adapting Kyle's show to the United States as a replacement for Oprah. By November 2010, the series was picked up in over 70% of American television markets, well ahead of its September 2011 debut. Kyle also had competition among three other tabloid talkers, already established veterans (and all distributed by NBCUniversal Television Distribution), Jerry Springer, The Steve Wilkos Show and Maury.

Like other tabloid talk shows, Jeremy Kyle aired primarily on affiliates of Fox, The CW and MyNetworkTV. Only a scattered number of ABC, CBS and NBC stations in smaller markets aired the program, with only a few using it to fill their former Oprah timeslot.

On November 17, 2011, the show was renewed for a second season.

=== Cancellation ===
The series was cancelled after two seasons on December 18, 2012, with the final episode airing in May 2013. In a joint-statement to Broadcasting & Cable, Debmar-Mercury co-presidents Mort Marcus and Ira Bernstein said, "We can confirm the American version of The Jeremy Kyle Show won't be returning for a third season. This is in no way a reflection of the quality of the show. Backed by a first-rate production team, Jeremy was amazing and showed all of us why he is such a rock star in the UK. Simply put, Jeremy is one of the best hosts we have ever seen, and we expect to see more of him on U.S. television in the years ahead. Unfortunately, talk shows like this simply take time to build and, while we were seeing ratings progress in many markets, it wasn't enough to justify going forward with another season."

== Initial reception ==
Before its American debut, Broadcasting & Cable writer Ben Grossman noted in his article that his show could be a threat to Anderson Cooper's syndicated talk show, which debuted in the same season (and ran for two years just like Kyle's did), and yet another confrontational tabloid talk veteran, Jerry Springer, whom Kyle replaced back in the UK when Springer's version of his American talk show aired there.
