= The Jeremy Kyle Show =

British tabloid talk show presented by Jeremy Kyle

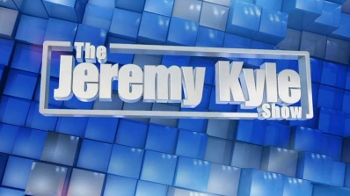
- Genre: Tabloid talk show
- Presented by: Jeremy Kyle
- Composer: Lorne Balfe
- Country of origin: United Kingdom
- Original language: English
- No. of series: 17
- No. of episodes: 3,320

Production
- Running time: 60 minutes
- Production company: ITV Studios Entertainment

Original release
- Network: ITV
- Release: 4 July 2005 – 10 May 2019

Related
- The Jeremy Kyle Show (American talk show); Trisha Goddard

The Jeremy Kyle Show is a British tabloid talk show presented by Jeremy Kyle and produced by ITV Studios. It premiered on the ITV network on 4 July 2005 and ran for seventeen series until its cancellation on 10 May 2019. It was the most popular programme in ITV's daytime schedule, broadcast on weekday mornings and reaching an audience of one million. It replaced the chat show Trisha following its move to Channel 5 in 2004.

The show's content centered on confrontations in which guests attempt to resolve personal conflicts, often related to family and romantic relationships, sex and addiction. It featured psychotherapist Graham Stanier, who assisted the guests during and after the show's broadcast, along with the use of polygraphs, despite lack of scientific evidence supporting the use of the device as a lie detector.

The Jeremy Kyle Show became controversial for placing guests in confrontational situations, with Kyle often chastising guests whom he felt had acted in morally dubious or irresponsible ways and stressing the importance of traditional family values, while guests frequently displayed strong emotions such as anger and distress. Despite ITV disputing claims that guests were mistreated on the programme and misled by researchers, a judge described the programme as "human bear-baiting" during a prosecution of guests who had a violent altercation on the programme. On 15 May 2019, the programme was cancelled, following the suicide of Steve Dymond, a guest whose appearance had been filmed in the week before but not aired. In September 2024, a coroner exonerated the programme as the cause of or as a contributory factor in Dymond's suicide, finding there was "no causal link" between the two.

== Background ==
In late 2004, Trisha Goddard left from ITV to move her talk show to Channel 5. Radio broadcaster Jeremy Kyle was drafted in to host a talk show, The Jeremy Kyle Show, which was first broadcast on 4 July 2005 in ITV's weekday 9:25am slot.

During the launch week of the programme and the week of Kyle's 40th birthday, the show was overshadowed by news coverage of the London tube bombings. Earlier in that week, a transmission breakdown disrupted one of the first three showings. In 2007, the show was nominated for the "Most Popular Factual Programme" award at the 13th National Television Awards, although lost in that category to Top Gear.

== Format ==
=== Guests ===
The guests were, according to the New Statesman, "poor, mainly white, always working-class families" who were concerned about the personal problems of someone they knew. In the opinion of Anoosh Chakelian in the same publication, it curated "a morbidly chaotic picture of a British underclass – for those watching at home to scoff and sneer at – with the veneer of helping them". In a 2007 article for The Independent, the journalist Paul Vallely referred to Kyle treating his guests "with a false mateyness, calling them 'babe', 'sweet' or 'Davey boy'". A former producer has alleged that the show's guests had mental health problems; the producer commented anonymously that the guests were normally "at the very least depressed" and that "if they truly screened for mental health issues, there would be no one on that show".

Episodes featured guests discussing personal problems, with Kyle mediating between involved parties. Common problems shown in episodes included uncertainty over the biological father of a baby, a family member committing petty theft, infidelity, and addiction to drugs. The producers have stated that backstage and after-show support and counselling were offered, guided by Graham Stanier, Kyle's in-show psychotherapist and director of aftercare. With other guests, polygraphs and DNA tests were frequently used to claim that an individual had been lying or telling the truth, or to reveal whether two people were biological relatives.

Frequently, when friends or relatives of the show's guests entered the stage having heard backstage what had been said, strong language and fights would break out, with the former resulting in the sound being dipped. The latter was similarly not shown; instead, the camera gave a view of the audience and Kyle until his security team had restored order. This led to the show being compared, by a former producer, with Roman gladiatorial combat in its brutality.

As the talk show's host, Kyle was known to react with hostility and anger towards those whom he saw as having acted improperly. Paul Vallely related an intervention by Kyle in 2007: "'I don't mean to be judgemental,' he adjudges. 'I'm just trying to help you in the little time I've got, but you two are both as bad as each other.' Minutes later he turns to one of them. 'Do something about your anger issues,' he says, evidently not realising he too is shouting". Accused of having a patronising attitude towards many of his guests, Kyle has been accused of exploitation. He has expressed a belief he was acting in the best interests of the guests and is intent on helping to solve their personal problems. After the show had been running for nearly four years, Kyle said over 300 people had entered rehabilitation funded by the programme. Critics, however, have said that Kyle's reactions and comments are repetitive and well-worn, such as "Put something on the end of it!" in the context of birth control, or his annoyance at unemployed fathers.

The validity of the help provided to guests has been called into dispute; professional psychotherapist and TV agony uncle Phillip Hodson, who was offered the chance to work on the show, said that he believed the audience ratings were more important to the show's producers than solving the guests' problems. A former producer for the show said in October 2007 that the production team encouraged guests to react angrily to one another.

=== Polygraph ===
In the show, a polygraph (referred to as a "lie detector") is applied to cases of theft and infidelity and the method is claimed to indicate whether someone is being deceptive. However, the validity of polygraph tests have been seriously questioned by researchers, to the point that they are rarely cited as a source of legal evidence in countries such as the United States, and its use on the show has been criticised, in spite of the show asserting the results to be infallible. At one point, to prove the legitimacy of the "lie detector" test, Jeremy Kyle performed a live on-stage test with the question, "Are you, or have you ever been, a llama?" to which he replied yes, which was identified as a lie. Carole Cadwalladr wrote in The Observer in 2008: "Kyle regularly claims the lie detector is 96 per cent accurate, whereas a 1997 survey of 421 psychologists estimated it to be 61 per cent. Or not much better than chance." Towards the end of the show, an on-screen disclaimer was shown before polygraph results were read out on the programme, stating, "The lie detector is designed to indicate whether someone is being deceptive. Practitioners claim its results have a high level of accuracy, although this is disputed." In a parliamentary inquiry, the producers at the time of cancellation said that they did not know how accurate the tests were.

== Reception ==
=== Court cases ===
By May 2019, the programme had directly led to two court cases related to assault and leading to convictions.

On 24 September 2007, a Manchester District Judge, Alan Berg, sentenced a man who headbutted his love rival while appearing on the show. Judge Berg said that the show's producers were partially to blame for the attack, that "the purpose of this show is to effect a morbid and depressing display of dysfunctional people whose lives are in turmoil", and that it was "a plain disgrace which goes under the guise of entertainment". He described it as "human bear-baiting" and said: "It should not surprise anyone that these people, some of whom have limited intellects, become aggressive with each other. This type of incident is exactly what the producers want. These self-righteous individuals should be in the dock with you. They pretend there is some kind of virtue in putting out a show like this."

An ITV spokeswoman responded in defence that "we take the safety and well-being of studio guests extremely seriously. It is made clear to all guests prior to going into the studio that no violence is ever tolerated." In an interview with the Daily Mirror, Kyle responded by saying: "Sometimes people need to be stripped bare before they can be helped."

An appearance on Kyle's programme by a couple on the issue of alleged infidelity led to a man's assault of his female partner and criminal charges being made against him. The woman sustained a "shattered eye socket and cheekbone and bite marks". At Peterborough Crown Court in July 2009, Judge Sean Enright jailed the man for two years after he admitted causing grievous bodily harm. The judge said "there is plainly an element of cruelty and exploitation in what takes place" on Kyle's programme, and that the couple "must have both suffered considerable mortification and embarrassment". Grant Cunningham, the head of ITV's factual programming, expressed surprise at the judge's comments, as the judge had not seen the programme, and disputed his claims.

=== Guest reactions ===
There have been success stories as a result of guests being on the show, such as the case of a morbidly obese young woman who lost a lot of weight after her appearance on the show. Stanier told The Observer that he was "immensely proud" of the help provided to the show's guests, with "full shows of people coming back on the programme who have been successful in overcoming drug, alcohol or relationship problems, through the care that we have provided".

Carole Cadwalladr of The Observer attended the filming of a special for the DVD Jeremy Kyle... Live! In Your Street. Jamie, a guest for the special, told Cadwalladr that he "was totally stitched up", calling his appearance "public humiliation". Jamie says that he "just wanted the DNA test" but "didn't have the money to get it done" and claims that the researchers "didn't care about the feelings of the people". He stated that when he informed the producers of his bipolar disorder and borderline schizophrenia, "There wasn't really a reaction". His stepmother Karen commented that the show was "so, so very wrong" and "almost like ritual abuse". A spokesperson for ITV stated that a psychotherapist found "no evidence of mental illness" in Jamie and claimed that "guests had to produce identification and were processed through security checks prior to admission"; however, Cadwalladr was present for the filming and disputes this.

Cadwalladr interviewed another person who appeared on the show, Kevin Lincoln. Although Lincoln rang up the show and wanted to take part, he signed the consent form only minutes before filming. Lincoln believes he was there "under false pretences" and says the show was "completely the opposite of what I was told it would be". He expected to discuss "his ex-girlfriend of trying to force him out of the wrestling gym where they both trained", but the segment was captioned "Ex, get out of my life!" and featured his ex-girlfriend "basically [accusing him] of being a stalker". Lincoln spent the two months between filming and broadcasting trying to prevent the episode from airing to no avail; once it aired, Lincoln reports that "I was forced out of my gym and all of my wrestling gigs were cancelled".

It has also been alleged that the producers "plied an alcoholic guest with beer before he appeared on the programme". ITV has denied these charges, claiming that "two of the guests were given alcohol to counteract withdrawal symptoms while the third had not mentioned a drink problem", that "guests are not deliberately agitated before appearing", and that the show provided to its guests "proper, professional help, funded by the programme, which has really and undeniably helped hundreds of people".

In 2015, the show received both criticism and interest following a segment where the show's audience laughed at a guest, Geoff, as he described being a male domestic abuse victim. Geoff said he had been locked in a flat three storeys up by his abusive girlfriend and had to escape by jumping from a balcony, sustaining significant injuries. Kyle criticised the audience's laughter.

It has also been alleged by a former guest on the show that due to Ofcom rules, they were forced to change out of a jumper with a branded logo into a tracksuit before being vilified by Kyle for their clothing choice. It has been alleged, by Zoe Williams of The Guardian and others, that guests were separated prior to the show and assigned separate researchers who would "wind up" guests in order to bring about a reaction when they appeared together during the programme's recording.

=== Critical reception ===
The Jeremy Kyle Show received extreme critical disdain throughout its run. In The Observer, Carole Cadwalladr was of the opinion that "the show is built around creating a spectacle out of the damaged fragments of people's lives" and summarised it as an "explosive spectacle of anger, vitriol and confrontation". Of Kyle, Cadwalladr said that "Some of his opinions are so well-worn they're almost catchphrases" and wrote in 2008 that the show was "more like a witchcraft trial. Where the judge and jury is Jeremy Kyle". Cadwalladr further criticised the "lie detector" as "the modern equivalent of the ducking stool, or at least about as scientifically accurate".

In Vice, Joel Golby opined that instead of being about the guests, the show was "about Jeremy, purring and padding around the studio", whom Golby called a "shark in the prime of its life". Writing that the show was "built on repetition", Golby called it "exemplar of the British fighting style" and commented that "in less artful hands, the misery would become a miasma. With Kyle at the helm, it becomes something else – characterful, textured misery".

In The Times, columnist Martin Samuel described the show as "a tragic, self-serving procession of freaks, misfits, sad sacks and hopelessly damaged human beings" and its guests as "a collection of angry, tearful and broken people, whose inexperience of talking through painful, contentious, volatile issues leaves them unprepared and inadequate for a confrontation of this nature" whilst noting that they "can only appear intellectually inferior to the host, too, with his sharp suit and well-rehearsed confidence".

Reviewing for The Guardian, Charlie Brooker wrote that the show was "completely and utterly horrid". Brooker described Kyle as "unafraid to hurl abuse at his hapless idiot guests" and commented "not that I'm saying Kyle himself is an agent of Satan, you understand. I'm just saying you could easily cast him as one. Especially if you wanted to save money on special effects". In an episode of Charlie Brooker's Screenwipe, Brooker later described the show as "a non-stop bellowing festival, in which a cast of people who resemble a sort of aquatic livestock chart the outer limits of incomprehension."

Derek Draper, writing in The Guardian, said that Kyle "effectively projects himself as a strong father figure, setting boundaries and trying to teach responsibility and restraint" to those on his show. Johann Hari of The Independent called the show's morality "unconsciously but wonderfully progressive", as it attacked "Men who treat women badly. Homophobes. Misogynists. Neglectful parents." However, Hari believed that "[t]here are good reasons to be worried". Hari summarised the show by saying that "distressed people [...] have their wounds ripped open for our enjoyment", suggested that all guests should receive ongoing counselling, and commented on how the working class were treated on the show: "[t]here are also ugly prejudices encoded in the sneers".

== Sponsorship ==
On 29 September 2007, Learndirect, the government-backed sponsors of The Jeremy Kyle Show, cancelled their £500,000 a year deal over concerns about its content following a letter of protest from Welsh Member of Parliament David Davies. Ufi, which runs the Learndirect adult learning service, said continuing the deal would not "protect and enhance" its reputation. The former sponsor of the show in Scotland, Shades Blinds, retained their association with the programme although they did raise the possibility of withdrawing their sponsorship. It was subsequently sponsored by The Sun Bingo, and has been sponsored by several bingo companies such as Wink Bingo, Foxy Bingo, Cheeky Bingo and Gala Bingo.

== Cancellation ==
On 9 May 2019, Hampshire Police found a man dead at an address in Portsmouth. He was confirmed to be 63-year-old Steve Dymond and the police said "the death is not being treated as suspicious". Dymond had been a guest on an episode of The Jeremy Kyle Show that had been filmed a week before his death and had not yet been aired. He took part in the show's polygraph test, which determined he was being unfaithful to his partner after he had initially denied being so. During the episode, Kyle accused Dymond of being a "serial liar" and made other disparaging comments and allegations about Dymond. The death was suspected to be a suicide.

On 13 May 2019, it was reported that ITV had suspended the recording and broadcasting of the series, including broadcasts on ITV, ITV2 and its on-demand service ITV Hub.

On 14 May 2019, ITV released a statement regarding the programme, detailing their duty of care processes on Jeremy Kyle. The statement concluded:

Everyone at ITV and The Jeremy Kyle Show is shocked and saddened at the news of the death of a participant in the show a week after the recording of the episode they featured in and our thoughts are with their family and friends. We will not screen the episode in which they featured. Given the seriousness of this event, ITV has also decided to suspend both filming and broadcasting of The Jeremy Kyle Show with immediate effect in order to give it time to conduct a review of this episode of the show and we cannot comment further until this review is completed.

As a result of this incident, several individuals called for the show to be permanently taken off the air, including former ITV executive chairman Michael Grade, Members of Parliament Damian Collins, Charles Walker and Julie Elliott and psychiatrist Simon Wessely. A statement from 10 Downing Street referred to the incident as "deeply concerning". Media regulator Ofcom stated that they were "discussing this programme with ITV as a priority to understand what took place."

On 15 May 2019, ITV's chief executive Carolyn McCall announced that the programme was cancelled, stating:

Given the gravity of recent events we have decided to end production of The Jeremy Kyle Show. The Jeremy Kyle Show has had a loyal audience and has been made by a dedicated production team for 14 years, but now is the right time for the show to end. Everyone at ITV's thoughts and sympathies are with the family and friends of Steve Dymond.

ITV also stated that the review into the Dymond episode would continue.

Following the cancellation, all of the official online channels for the show were removed along with all their content, including its YouTube, Facebook, Twitter and Instagram accounts, along with its official website, effectively eliminating any traces of the show from circulation.

On 19 May, it was revealed that a guest on another show hosted by Kyle, Britain's Worst Husband, died by suicide after her appearance.

On 18 June 2019, it was announced that Kyle declined to appear before MPs investigating reality television, although senior executives (including McCall and Stanier) had appeared.

In February 2020, it was reported that Natasha Reddican, an ITV producer who had worked on the show, had died. A coroner later ruled her death to be a suicide. Colleagues speaking anonymously to Channel 4 said she had struggled with feelings of guilt.

A coroner's ruling published in November 2020 stated that "acts or omissions" by Kyle "may have caused or contributed to" Dymond's death. However, on 10 September 2024, Hampshire coroner Jason Pegg found "no causal link" between the show and Dymond's suicide, noting how "aftercare records indicate Steve Dymond was 'emotionally contained' and expressed no dissatisfaction towards his treatment during the recording with a plan for follow-up CBT support".

A documentary about the cancellation, Jeremy Kyle Show: Death on Daytime aired on Channel 4 on 13 and 14 March 2022.

== Parodies ==
The Jeremy Kyle Show has been the subject of parody by at least two BBC comedy shows. In the programme Dead Ringers, a parody of the show has appeared. Also, in October 2007, the BBC began broadcasting The Life and Times of Vivienne Vyle, a sitcom starring and co-written by Jennifer Saunders and Tanya Byron. David Walliams had a series of sketches parodying the show as if it involved middle class guests in his sketch show Walliams & Friend in 2016.

The music video for Let You Go by Chase & Status darkly satirises Kyle and his show; portrayed by actor Glenn Carter, the parodic 'Patrick Chase' chastises guests on his talk show, before engaging in substance abuse, adultery, heavy drinking, partying, and the hiring of a prostitute with whom Chase has intercourse while watching himself on television.

In the webcomic Scary Go Round, the character Desmond Fishman goes on The Jeremy Kyle Show as part of a scheme to parlay his freakish fish-like biology into fame and fortune.

== Episodes ==
=== Transmissions ===
Series	Episodes	Originally released	
Series	Episodes	First released	Last released
1	28	4 July 2005	12 August 2005
2	82	19 September 2005	2006
3	150	1 March 2006	28 July 2006
4	328	2006	2007
5	326	2007	2008
6	252	2008	2009
7	215	2009	2010
8	203	2010	2011
9	218	2011	2012
10	205	2012	30 May 2014
11	191	18 September 2013	15 September 2015
12	190	9 July 2014	1 December 2016
13	190	26 June 2015	16 February 2017
14	190	10 May 2016	27 September 2017
15	190	2 May 2017	6 July 2018
16	190	16 April 2018	12 April 2019
17	19	2 April 2019	10 May 2019

== DVD ==
A behind-the-scenes DVD, titled Jeremy Kyle: Access All Areas, was released in late 2009. The DVD follows the series' structure and how each programme was prepared and produced.

== American version ==
In January 2010, ITV announced an agreement to take a pilot version of the show to the United States in 2010, in partnership with Lions Gate Entertainment subsidiary Debmar-Mercury. The pilot proved successful, and in November 2010, the American version was picked up in 70% of the U.S. television markets, ahead of its 19 September 2011 debut. In December 2012, the American version of The Jeremy Kyle Show was cancelled due to lower than expected ratings.
