= Jeremy Kyle's Emergency Room =

British reality medical show

- Genre: Reality medical show
- Presented by: Jeremy Kyle
- Country of origin: United Kingdom
- Original language: English
- No. of series: 2
- No. of episodes: 50

Production
- Production locations: dock10, MediaCityUK
- Running time: 60 minutes (inc. adverts)
- Production company: ITV Studios

Original release
- Network: ITV
- Release: 15 June 2015 – 3 February 2017

Jeremy Kyle's Emergency Room is a British reality medical show presented by Jeremy Kyle that aired on ITV for two series between 15 June 2015 and 3 February 2017.

== Background ==
The show is based on people's medical worries in which doctors attempt to resolve issues. These issues can often be sexual, physical or mental. Frequently, patients display strong emotions such as distress. Sometimes, patients don't let their partners in the emergency room.

== Transmissions ==
Serie	Start date	End date	Episodes
1	15 June 2015	26 June 2015	10
2	22 February 2016	3 February 2017	40
