= High Stakes (game show) =

British game show

- Presented by: Jeremy Kyle
- Voices of: Elizabeth Conboy; Marc Silk
- Country of origin: United Kingdom
- Original language: English
- No. of series: 1
- No. of episodes: 8

Production
- Production location: Granada Studios
- Running time: 60 minutes (inc. adverts)
- Production company: ITV Studios in association with Escalate Television

Original release
- Network: ITV
- Release: 11 October – 20 December 2011

High Stakes is a British game show series hosted by Jeremy Kyle, in which a single contestant can win up to £500,000 (£1,000,000 in the pilot filmed in March 2011) by solving clues to avoid traps laid on a floor grid of numbers. The ITV series' commenced broadcasting on 11 October 2011 and finished broadcasting on 20 December 2011.

== Gameplay ==
The game is played using six rows of seven consecutive numbers each, displayed one row at a time on a floor grid. Every row corresponds to a different stage of the game. Certain numbers are secretly designated as traps, starting with one in Stage 1 and adding one more in each subsequent stage to a maximum of six. Only one trap is active at any given time, except in Sudden Death mode (see below).

The contestant may ask for up to 10 clues in order to avoid traps. When a clue is requested, it is read aloud and refers to the active trap on the current stage. (E.g. "Avoid the number of pennies in a British shilling prior to decimalisation" would indicate the number 12 as a trap.) The host is not given any advance information on the clues or trap locations, and the contestant may ask him to help interpret the clues if desired.

After either hearing or declining a clue, the contestant must step onto a number they believe is safe. If it is, the trap is revealed and eliminated from play, and the next trap is set. However, if the contestant steps onto a trap at any moment, the game ends immediately. A stage is completed once the contestant has avoided the last trap on the current row.

The contestant's winnings are increased after every stage, as shown below:

- Stage 1 – £1,000
- Stage 2 – £2,500
- Stage 3 – £10,000
- Stage 4 – £25,000
- Stage 5 – £100,000
- Stage 6 – £500,000

Upon completing a stage, they may either end the game and keep all the money, or "raise the stakes" and risk it on the next stage. If the contestant steps onto a trap in Stage 1 or 2, they forfeit all their money; if on Stage 3 or later, their winnings are reduced one level below the last stage they completed.

=== Sudden Death ===
If the contestant chooses to raise the stakes after exhausting all 10 clues (11 in the pilot) and completing either the fourth or fifth grid (or sixth in the pilot), the game enters Sudden Death mode and all traps become active. If the contestant exhausts all 10 clues, during either the fifth or sixth grid (seventh grid, if all 11 clues are exhausted, only in the pilot tapings), the game immediately enters Sudden Death mode and the remaining traps will become active. They step onto a square they believe is safe, then choose a second one they believe to be a trap. If the second square is a trap, it is marked as such; if safe, it is eliminated. In the final grid, if the second square is safe, it's game over. The contestant repeats this process until they have either found every trap or eliminated every safe square. In the former case, the stage is complete and the contestant can either stop or raise the stakes. In the latter, the game ends and the contestant forfeits a portion of their winnings as described above. Only one contestant entered this mode, overall.

== Production ==
The programme is produced by ITV Studios and co-produced by Escalate Television and filmed in Studio 12 of the Granada Studios in Manchester. The studio facility is listed as 3SixtyMedia in the closing credits, which refers to the holding company that maintains the studios. The pilot for the US version was also filmed on the British set.

== International versions ==
| Country | Name | Prize increments | | | | | | | Presenter | Channel | Dates |
|---|---|---|---|---|---|---|---|---|---|---|---|
| United States (pilot) | High Stakes | $1,000 | $2,500 | $10,000 | $50,000 | $100,000 | $250,000 | $1,000,000 | Mark McGrath | NBC | 11 March 2011 (pilot not picked up) |

The show was piloted for NBC in the United States the day after the British pilot was filmed, with Mark McGrath as host and a $1,000,000 top prize. There were seven levels instead of six with eight numbers in each level instead of seven and the traps were called "fails" and the clues were called "avoids" which there were eleven of instead of ten. In the pilot, the contestant answered the $250,000 question incorrectly, winning $50,000. Had the show been picked up for a series, the top prize would have been $500,000 with six levels with seven numbers and ten clues.
