= Bwin =

Austrian online betting brand

Bwin Interactive Entertainment AG
- Type: Subsidiary
- Industry: Online Gambling
- Founded: 1997
- Successor: Bwin.Party Digital Entertainment
- Headquarters: Vienna, Austria
- Key people: Manfred Bodner (co-CEO); Norbert Teufelberger (co-CEO); Hannes Androsch (Chairman of the supervisory board)
- Products: Sports betting, online casino, poker
- Revenue: €423.1 million (2009)
- Operating income: €48.9 million (2009)
- Net income: €46.3 million (2009)
- Number of employees: 1,570 (2009)
- Parent: Entain
- Website: bwin-uk.co

Bwin Interactive Entertainment AG, formerly Betandwin, is an Austrian online gambling brand owned by Entain. The brand offers sports betting, online casino and poker products in regulated markets through Entain operating companies. Bwin's products include sports betting, casino games and poker. The brand operates as part of Entain's portfolio of sports betting and gaming brands. Competence centers were located in Vienna, Stockholm, and Gibraltar.

Bwin was listed on the Vienna Stock Exchange from 2000 until the 2011 merger of bwin and PartyGaming, which formed Bwin.Party Digital Entertainment. GVC Holdings acquired bwin,party in 2016, and GVC changed its name to Entain in 2020.

Bwin was Real Madrid's shirt sponsor from 2007 to 2013.

== History ==
Bwin was founded in 1997 as Bertandwin by Norbert Teufelberger and Manfred Bodner. The company launched its online gambling site in 1998, focusing on the growing sports betting market. Betandwin was listed on the Vienna Stock Exchange in March 2000.

In 2001, Betandwin acquired Simon Bold (Gibraltar) and later operated through Bwin International Ltd.

Betandwin launched an online casino platform in 2001 and introduced a soft games platform in 2003.

Betandwin launched multiplayer poker in 2004. In 2005, it acquired betoto.com, a fixed-odds betting business.

In 2005, Betandwin acquired Ongame e-solutions AB. After the acquisition, Ongame e-Solutions was renamed Bwin Games.

Betandwin changed its brand name to Bwin in 2006.

In 2009, Bwin acquired the Italian poker operator Gioco Digitale.

=== PartyGaming merger ===
Bwin and PartGaming completed their merger in 2011, forming Bwin.Party Digital Entertainment. Bwin shareholders owned 51.6 percent of the combined company and PartyGaming shareholders owned 48.4 percent. he merged company was listed on the London Stock Exchange. GVC Holdings acquired bwin.party in 2016, and Bwin continued as a brand within the group.

GVC Holdings changed its name to Entain in 2020.

== Products ==
Bwin offers sports betting, online casino and poker products as part of Entain's brand portfolio.

=== Sports Betting ===
Sports betting is one of Bwin's main product categories.

=== Poker ===
Bwin offers online poker in jurisdictions where Entain operating companies hold relevant licenses. The Mac and Windows versions offer features including statistics and a mini-table function. The Java client is platform-agnostic and browser-based. The mobile client allows customers to play cash games on their mobile phones.

=== Casino Games ===
Bwin offers online casino products in licensed markets.

== Bwin Games AB ==
Bwin Games AB, formerly Ongame e-Solutions AB, became part of Bwin after the acquisition of Ongame.

=== PokerRoom.com ===
PokerRoom.com was an online poker room associated with Ongame. PokerRoom.com closed in 2009, and users were directed to Bwin.com.

== Regulations and legal issues ==
In September 2006, Bwin co-chief executives Norbert Teufelberger and Manfred Bodner were detained in France in connected with alleged breaches of French gambling law and were later released.

After the SAFE Port Act signed in 2006, Bwin stopped accepting bets from customer in the United States.

In 2021, Bwin ended its operations in Russia and transferred its player base to Parimatch Russia.

In 2022, Entain obtained German online gaming and poker licenses covering brands, including Bwin. The licenses covered online gaming under Bwin, Ladbrokes and Sportingbet, and online poker under Bwin and Ladbrokes.

== Sponsorship ==
Bwin was Real Madrid's shirt sponsor from 2007 to 2013. The brand held football sponsorships with FC Bayern Munich, the Portuguese League Cup and Serie B. Bwin has sponsored European football clubs and competitions, including AC Milan, Real Madrid, Juventus, Werder Bremen and Primeira Liga.

In 2006, Bremen authorities prohibited Werder Bremen from displaying the Bwin logo on its shirts because of restrictions on online betting advertising.

In 2017, Bwin entered a three-year partnership with Inter Milan. In 2019, Bwin became Valencia CF's main global sponsor under a three-year agreement. Spanish restrictions on gambling sponsorship affected betting-related shirt sponsorship from the 2021–22 season.

In 2020, Bwin entered a three-year sports-betting partnership with the Belgian Pro League. In 2021, Bwin became the title sponsor of Liga Portugal. Betclic replaced Bwin as title sponsor from the 2023–24 season.

From the 2021–22 season to the 2023–24 season, Bwin held sports-betting partnerships with Borussia Dortmund, Union Berlin, FC Köln, FC St. Pauli and Dynamo Dresden.

Bwin was an official partner of the UEFA Europa League and UEFA Europa Conference League for the 2021–24 seasons.

== Responsible Gaming ==
Bwin has been associated with European gambling industry bodies, including the European Gaming and Betting Association.
