= Gavin Isaacs =

Australian lawyer and gambling industry executive

- Born: 1963 or 1964 (age 61–62)
- Education: University of New South Wales; University of Sydney
- Occupations: Businessman and lawyer
- Title: former CEO, Entain
- Term: September 2024 - February 2025

Gavin Isaacs (born 1963 or 1964) is an Australian lawyer and gambling industry executive, and the CEO of Entain since September 2024 to February 2025.

Isaacs grew up in Australia. He earned a bachelor's degree in commerce and law from the University of New South Wales and a master of laws degree from the University of Sydney.

Isaacs worked for Aristocrat Technologies, Bally Technologies, SB Tech, DraftKings, and Scientific Games Corporation. Isaacs was vice chairman, president, and CEO of Scientific Games Corporation. He joined Entain as CEO in September 2024. On 11 February 2025, Entain announced that Issacs had left his role with immediate effect.

He has been married to Donna since 1993, and they have two adult children who both live and work in New York City.
