= Shay Segev =

Israeli businessman (born 1976)

- Born: 1976 (age 49–50); Israel
- Education: Tel Aviv University, Kellogg School of Management
- Occupation: Businessman
- Years active: 1998 - present
- Known for: CEO of DAZN
- Children: 4
- Website: dazngroup.com

Shay Segev (born 1976) is an Israeli business executive in the technology sector and the CEO of DAZN, the over-the-top (OTT) sports subscription streaming service.

Described by Gaming Intelligence as a tech “futurist”, Segev is the former chief executive of Entain plc, previously GVC Holdings, a global sports betting and gambling company listed on the London FTSE 100 index. Before that he was chief operating officer of Playtech, a gambling software development company listed on London's FTSE 250.

== Early life and education ==
Segev learned to code at a young age. He holds a B.Sc. in Computer Science from Tel Aviv University and an MBA from Northwestern University - Kellogg School of Management, obtained in 2005.

== Career ==
Segev was an executive at software company Mercury Interactive. In 2006, he joined Videobet, a subsidiary of Playtech, as chief operating officer (COO). He later became CEO of the server-based gaming subsidiary of Videobet, and then chief operating officer (COO) of the Playtech group in 2011 and later CEO of Playtech's retail subsidiary. Segev joined the Gaming Standards Association as a board member at about the same time.

In July 2015, Segev joined Gala Coral Group as chief strategy officer. In 2016, he joined GVC Holdings as COO to manage the merger between GVC and bwin.party and deliver €125 million in synergies, transforming the business and returning it to growth. He was also involved in GVC's integration of Ladbrokes Coral and their joint venture with MGM. In 2018, he also joined the board of BetMGM.

In July 2020, Segev succeeded Kenny Alexander as CEO of GVC Holdings, changed the company name to Entain plc, and unveiled a new strategy centred on growth and sustainability. In 2021, Entain's joint venture partner MGM Resorts tried to acquire Entain for $11 billion. The offer was rejected by Segev and the board.

In June 2021, Segev became co-CEO of sports streaming service DAZN. In January 2022, he was appointed the sole CEO.

== Recognition ==
Segev has appeared in the Gaming Intelligence Hot 50 more times than anyone else.

== Personal life ==
Segev lives in Gibraltar with his wife and four children.
