= Jeremy Kyle =

English radio and television presenter (born 1965)

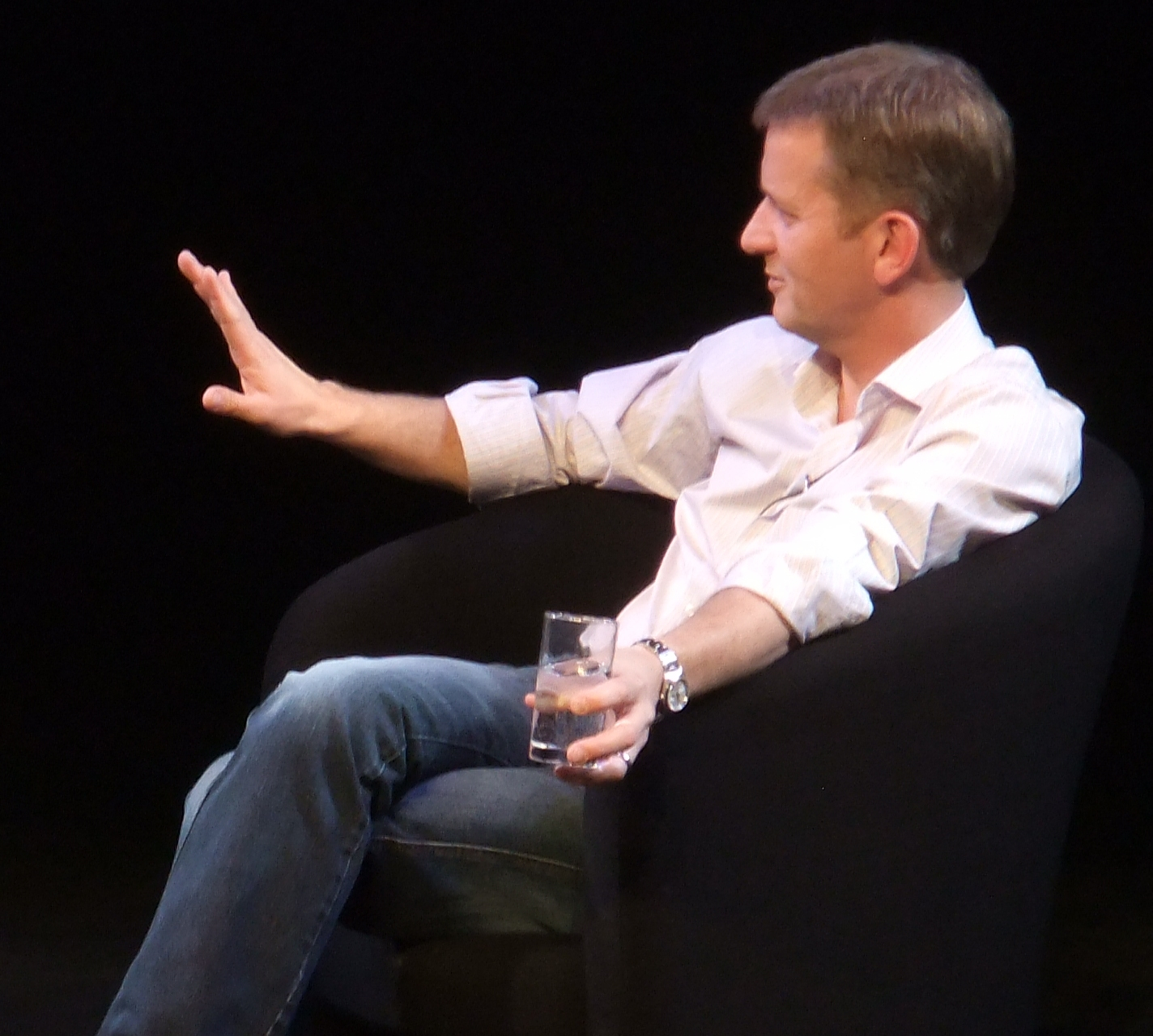
- Kyle at Radio Festival in 2010
- Born: Jeremy Neil Kyle; 7 July 1965 (age 61); Reading, Berkshire, England
- Education: University of Surrey (BA)
- Occupations: Broadcaster; writer
- Years active: 1996–present
- Television: The Jeremy Kyle Show; High Stakes; Jeremy Kyle's Emergency Room; The Jeremy Kyle Show USA; The Kyle Files; TalkTV
- Political party: Reform UK
- Other political affiliations: Conservative (before 2024)
- Spouses: Kirsty Rowley (m. 1989; div. 1991); Carla Germaine (m. 2003; div. 2016); Vicky Burton (m. 2021)
- Children: 6

Jeremy Neil Kyle (born 7 July 1965) is an English broadcaster and writer. He is best known for hosting the tabloid talk show The Jeremy Kyle Show on ITV from 2005 to 2019. He also hosted an American version of his eponymous show, which ran for two seasons beginning in 2011. Since 2022, Kyle has been a presenter for Talk.

== Early life ==
Kyle was born in Reading, Berkshire, and is of Scottish descent. His father was an accountant and personal secretary to the Queen Mother for 40 years. Kyle has said that his older brother, Nick, has experienced drug addiction.

He attended the Reading Blue Coat School, a boys' private school in Sonning, Berkshire.

Kyle's first job was at Marks & Spencer. He studied History and Sociology at the University of Surrey in Guildford.

== Career ==
=== Radio ===
From 1986 to 1995, Kyle worked as a life insurance salesman, recruitment consultant, and radio advertising salesman. He then became a radio presenter and after working at Orchard FM in Taunton, Somerset, and Leicester Sound in Leicester, he was signed by Kent's Invicta FM in 1996. In 1997, he joined BRMB in Birmingham, presenting the shows Late & Live and Jezza's Jukebox.

In 2000, Kyle moved to the Century FM network, taking this format with him. The show was called Jezza's Confessions. It was broadcast between 9 pm and 1 am. He won a Sony Award for Late & Live in 2001. On 1 July 2002, he made his first broadcast on Virgin Radio, presenting Jezza's Virgin Confessions every weekday from 8 pm to midnight. In mid-2003, he broadcast the show from 9 pm to 1 am every weekday, and in January 2004 the show went out from 10 pm to 1 am, Sunday to Thursday. He left Virgin Radio in June 2004. From 5 September 2004, Kyle presented the Confessions show on London's Capital FM. The new programme aired Sunday to Thursday from 10 pm to 1 am with live calls on relationship issues of all kinds. Capital Confessions came to an end on 22 December 2005 to make way for The Jeremy Kyle Show, a similar show which ran from January 2006 to December 2006.

In late 2007, Kyle began a new show (The Jeremy Kyle Show), broadcasting across GCap Media's One Network, of which Orchard FM, Invicta FM and BRMB, his previous employers, were a part. The programme differed from his previous shows in that he interviewed celebrities. Kyle also began broadcasting a new programme, on Essex FM, in November 2007. Kyle joined Talksport on 21 September 2008 to present a lunchtime sports show every Sunday called The Jeremy Kyle Sunday Sports Show. As a result of Talksport's Premiership coverage on a Sunday, Kyle's show was cancelled, and he left the station.

In 2022, TalkRadio paid a "substantial" libel settlement to Labour MP Barry Gardiner regarding a false claim, broadcast by Jeremy Kyle on the station.

=== Television ===
In 2005, Kyle moved his format to ITV with a programme also entitled The Jeremy Kyle Show. Members of his production team later accused Kyle of looking down on his guests. He was recorded referring to participants on his show that day as "thick as shit".

In September 2007, Manchester judge Alan Berg described the show as "trash" which existed to "titillate bored members of the public with nothing better to do".

In February 2008, The Jeremy Kyle Show was again criticised in court after a man who found out during the recording of a show that he was not the father of his wife's child later pointed an air rifle at her. Other shows Kyle is involved with include Kyle's Academy, a ten-part series for ITV daytime which first aired on 18 June 2007. A team of experts (life coaches and psychotherapists), headed by Kyle, takes five people and works with them over an intensive fortnight to help them on the road to a happier more fulfilled life. Kyle has also presented Half Ton Hospital, a show about morbidly obese people in the United States.

On 19 April 2011, Kyle began presenting a documentary series called Military Driving School, where he visited the Defence School of Transport at Leconfield in East Yorkshire, following a group of new recruits as they undergo training as front line military drivers. In 2011, he was the presenter of the ITV game show High Stakes.

In 2015 and 2019, Kyle presented two series of The Kyle Files, a primetime show on ITV.

In 2015, he fronted a ten-part daytime series called Jeremy Kyle's Emergency Room. The show returned for a second series in March 2016.

From March 2016 until August 2018, Kyle relief presented ITV's breakfast programme Good Morning Britain.

In May 2019, the recording and broadcasting of The Jeremy Kyle Show was suspended after a guest died by suicide shortly after appearing in an episode of the series. A review of the episode occurred before any resumption of the programme's transmission, and on 15 May 2019, ITV confirmed that the series had ceased production with immediate effect. It has since been revealed that more guests had taken their own lives following their appearances in this and another programme hosted by Kyle on Channel 5, Britain's Worst Husband.

Kyle began developing a new show for ITV three months after his show was cancelled. ITV's director of television Kevin Lygo said a pilot episode was being made with Kyle, but the new show would not air in The Jeremy Kyle Show's old timeslot.

In early September 2021, it was announced that Kyle would present TalkRadio Drivetime between Monday and Thursday. The show started on 13 September. In April 2022, he announced his return to television to present a primetime show for TalkTV.

In September 2024, the inquest for 63-year-old Steve Dymond, in Winchester, heard that he had been found dead from the combined effect of a morphine overdose and a heart condition, at his home in Portsmouth in May 2019. Kyle denied humiliating the guest on his former talk show a week earlier, in an attempt to prove he had cheated on his partner. In the footage, shown at the inquest, Kyle told the guest to "grow a pair" and "I wouldn't trust you with a chocolate button". Dymond's son Carl Woolley told the inquest his father had been "very down" after the recording and told the hearing: "Jeremy Kyle had got the crowd to egg on, to boo at him and stuff, he was cast as the liar before he had even spoken." On 10 September, however, the coroner ruled that there was "no causal link" between Dymond's appearance on the show and his subsequent death.

== Personal life ==
He stated in his book I'm Only Being Honest, published in 2009, that he has obsessive–compulsive disorder.

Kyle's first marriage to Kirsty Rowley in 1989 was short-lived because of his addiction to gambling, which made him accumulate a debt which peaked at £12,000, and took some years to pay off. He married Carla Germaine in 2002. The couple separated amicably in 2015; they had three children. Their divorce was confirmed the following February. Kyle also has a daughter from his first marriage.

In late 2012, Kyle was diagnosed with testicular cancer. He received chemotherapy and underwent surgery to remove the affected testicle.

In February 2018, Kyle announced his engagement to Vicky Burton, his children's former nanny. They got married in October 2021 in Windsor, Berkshire, where the couple live. They have two children together.

In 2021, Kyle stated that he had been diagnosed with an anxiety disorder after The Jeremy Kyle Show was cancelled.

== Filmography ==
Year	Title	Role
2005–2019	The Jeremy Kyle Show	Presenter
2006	An Audience with Coronation Street	Guest appearance
2007	Coronation Street Confidential	Guest appearance
2009	The Fattest Man in Britain	Presenter
2010	This Morning	Presenter
2011	Military Driving School	Presenter
2011	High Stakes	Presenter
2011–2013	The Jeremy Kyle Show USA	Presenter
2013	Sunday Scoop	Guest presenter
2013–2015	Ant & Dec's Saturday Night Takeaway	Himself
2014	Celebrity Jeremy Kyle	Presenter
2015	World Championships Snooker	Celebrity player
2015–2017	Jeremy Kyle's Emergency Room	Presenter
2015–2019	The Kyle Files	Presenter
2016–2018	Good Morning Britain	Relief presenter
2019	Kyle's House	Presenter
2019	Cold Feet	Himself
2022	Piers Morgan Uncensored	Stand in presenter
2022–2023	Jeremy Kyle Live	Presenter
2023–2024	Talk Today	Monday–Thursday with Nicola Thorp
