= Bwin.Party Digital Entertainment =

Former online gambling company

Coordinates: 36.142633°N 5.358695°W

- Type: Subsidiary
- ISIN: GI000A0MV757
- Industry: Online gaming
- Predecessor: Bwin; PartyGaming
- Founded: 2011
- Successor: Entain
- Headquarters: Suite 711, Europort, Gibraltar
- Revenue: €611.9 million (2014)
- Operating income: €(97.9) million (2014)
- Net income: €(94.3) million (2014)
- Website: www.bwinparty.com

Bwin.Party Digital Entertainment was an online gambling company, formed by the March 2011 merger of PartyGaming plc and Bwin Interactive Entertainment AG. Formerly the world's largest publicly traded online gambling firm, it was best known for its online poker room PartyPoker, World Poker Tour and its sports betting brand Bwin (officially styled bwin).

The company was headquartered in Gibraltar and quoted on the London Stock Exchange. PartyGaming Plc was founded in 1997 with the launch of Starluck Casino. Prior to passage of the Unlawful Internet Gambling Enforcement Act of 2006 by the U.S. Congress, the firm was the world's largest online poker brand, based on cash game revenue and number of players. Its market share has fallen since then, but it remains the third largest online poker room in the world, behind PokerStars and Full Tilt Poker.

The new company became the world's largest publicly traded online gaming firm in 2010, 48.4% owned by existing PartyGaming shareholders and 51.6% by bwin shareholders. The merged company was listed on the London Stock Exchange, with joint CEOs Norbert Teufelberger and Jim Ryan.

Following a protracted bidding process between 888 Holdings and GVC (now Entain), Bwin.Party confirmed on 4 September 2015 that it had accepted GVC's bid for £1.1 billion. The transaction was completed on 1 February 2016.

== History ==
Party Gaming and Bwin merged on 31 March 2011. The rumors of a planned Bwin and Party merger began in November 2009, but were not confirmed until a joint statement was issued 26 August 2010. In December 2010 shareholders were sent a 478-page document with details and an outline of planned merger. On 28 Jan 2011 the merger was approved by shareholders and then completed on 31 March 2011.

In October 2012, bwin announced the sale of its leading online poker network, Ongame, to Amaya Gaming Group in a deal worth up to €25 million.

In November 2013 it was announced that bwin.party had applied for an online gaming licence for the state of New Jersey in July, and on 8 November had been awarded a transactional waiver by the New Jersey Division of Gaming Enforcement allowing it to participate in the online gaming market in the state, prior to a full licence being granted. The group launched both poker and casino games under the land-based casino licence of its New Jersey partner, Borgata Casino, the launch included both Borgata's and its own brands, including partypoker.com. By the end of December, the new partypoker site had acquired 50% of the cash game traffic in New Jersey.

Following a protracted bidding process between 888 Holdings and GVC Holdings, Bwin.Party confirmed on 4 September 2015 that it had accepted GVC's bid for £1.1 billion. The transaction was completed on 1 February 2016, as indicated by cancellation of LSE traded shares on 2 February 2016.

== Products and services ==
=== Sports betting ===
Sports bets were the core business at bwin, with a sports betting lineup including more than 90 different sports; the principal customer interest is soccer. In order to boost bwin's presence in the UK football betting market, the company launched bwinbetting.com in 2011. Other sports included all popular ball-related sports, US sports as well as all major winter sports and motorsports ranging from Formula 1 to MotoGP. "Exotic" sports such as roller hockey, futsal and darts were also included in the daily lineup. Customers could also find odds on a range of events outside of sports. These included bets on politics and entertainment such as the Oscars, talent shows, the Eurovision Song Contest and "Miss" events.

=== Poker ===
The following types of games were offered at bwin Poker: Texas Hold'em, Omaha, Omaha Hi/Lo, Seven Card Stud, Seven Card Stud Hi/Lo and Five-card draw, plus house variations like Double (three hole cards, choose two, halfway between Hold'em and Omaha). In terms of stakes, users could choose between Fixed Limit, Pot Limit or No Limit tables. A "play money" version of the games was also available for users to try out for free. bwin offered poker tournaments, both Sit & Go and scheduled, and cash games (ring games). Sit & Go tournaments began as soon as the table was completely occupied. Scheduled tournaments began at a specified time and allowed for higher numbers of participants and the highest prize pools. In cash games the players could join and leave whenever they wanted. bwin Poker could be played using the Mac OS X Poker Client, the Windows Poker Client, the Java Poker Client or the Poker app for Android or the iPhone. The Mac and Windows version offered an extensive selection of features such as statistics and a mini-table function. The Java client was platform-independent as it was a browser-based solution. In January 2011, bwin launched a dedicated Poker app for the iPhone to allow real money poker. This was followed in July 2011 by a similar application for Android-based devices. The mobile client allowed customers to play cash games on their mobile phones. Both apps were restricted to limited territories as permitted by local laws.

=== PokerRoom.com ===
PokerRoom.com was an online poker cardroom founded in 1999. Licensed by the Kahnawake Gaming Commission, PokerRoom offered both play and real money formats. Tournaments and ring games were available in both web-browser and download client platforms, with support for both Macintosh and Linux. PokerRoom was one of the first online poker sites to provide multi-language support, and catered to Danish, German, Spanish, French, Italian, Russian, and Swedish speakers. These languages were accessed via "regional sites", many of them showing local sponsoring for the selected region. After 10 years of operation, bwin announced the closure of PokerRoom.com on 14 April 2009. It was relaunched in 2012 but shut down again on 19 February 2013.

=== Bingo ===
Following the acquisition of Cashcade in 2009, bwin.party took control of a B2C portfolio of online bingo brands including Foxy Bingo, PartyBingo and Cheeky Bingo. Cashcade was the first company to promote online bingo to a mass market via television advertising and was first to develop the "free bingo" concept to attract new customers. Bwin began offering bingo at the end of December 2009 when its Italian subsidiary, Gioco Digitale, launched bingo as the first authorised Italian private online gaming operator.

=== Casino games ===
bwin offered more than 100 games, ranging from classics such as roulette or blackjack to slot machines and casino tournaments. The casino has a longstanding tradition at bwin: In 2001, it was introduced as a second product, after sports betting. The biggest ever casino jackpot win happened in 2014 when an individual won a little over 6 million Euros.

=== Soft games ===
bwin offered more than 60 games divided into the categories of Fortune Games, Skill Games, Mini Games and "ParaDice", as well as Backgammon. This was the product group with the biggest potential for innovation and expansion on the market.

== Legal Status ==
As the global legal framework for internet gambling is a complicated mix of laws and regulations, bwin's situation varied depending on the country concerned. Recently, Italy extended its online licences to include poker tournaments, and countries such as Denmark and Spain announced their intention to permit private operators access to their markets under stringent conditions and controls. On the other hand, other countries maintain a state monopoly on internet gaming, or ban it completely.

On 15 September 2006, Norbert Teufelberger and Manfred Bodner were arrested at a press conference in La Turbie, France, for allegedly breaking French gambling laws. After an investigation, a judge released them three days later. When France opened their market for private online gaming in June 2010, bwin became the first operator there.

In February 2013, the Australian Communications and Media Authority referred the Bwin arm of bwin.party to the Australian Federal Police for contraventions of the Interactive Gambling Act. The Act prohibits gambling companies from providing 'interactive' gambling services to those in Australia. Penalties for each breach, which can be for each day, are $220,000 for individuals and $1.1 million for corporations.

== Sponsorship ==
Bwin recently sponsored football giants Real Madrid, A.C. Milan and Bayern Munich and more recently Olympique de Marseille. In October 2010, Bwin announced a sponsorship for the upcoming three football seasons in which it would be the title sponsor of the Taça de Portugal, named the "Bwin Cup". Italy's second tier, Serie B, has already been re-branded "Serie bwin" after a two-year sponsorship deal was signed in July 2010.

On 16 August 2012, bwin announced it was entering into a digital partnership with Manchester United to become the club's official online gaming and betting partner.

In the past, many other top events in the international and local sports world were supported by the corporation. Bwin also sponsored the Portuguese first football league (bwinLIGA) and has been partner to clubs such as Juventus and Werder Bremen.

Bwin cooperated with the International Basketball Association (FIBA) and has sponsored the European and World Basketball Championships since 2006. A second basketball sponsorship is Euroleague Basketball. Bwin's marketing and media rights agreement for Euroleague events expired in June 2014.

In the area of motorsport, the company was one of the main sponsors of the MotoGP series. In 2012, it was the title sponsor of the races in Jerez and GP in Brno and official partner of the Misano, Mugello and Silverstone. In December 2011, bwin announced it would be extending its Moto GP sponsorships through 2013.

In addition, Bwin organised numerous poker events both online and offline. One of the biggest regular online tournaments was the ChampionChip. Special poker tournaments like the Weekly Country Showdown or the Bwin Dailies offered a range of tournaments adjusted to country specifics and buy-in levels. Periodically, there were launched new types and variations of Sit & Go's. Also, several online qualifiers the Bwin user could qualify for offline events like the World Series of Poker (WSOP), the Aussie Millions and events on the World Poker Tour. For "poker newbies", Bwin offered the Rookie Challenge where a new poker player had the chance to climb up several stages for free to earn real money tickets.

The company faced some opposition in Europe over sponsorship of sports, especially football. In 2006, the German city of Bremen banned its top football club, Werder Bremen, from carrying the Bwin logo on its shirts.

In January 2014, the company announced major sponsorship deals with the New Jersey Devils and Philadelphia 76ers. The combined deals included major advertising to the fans of both teams and the creation of the Dream Seat Series, which was a series of online poker tournaments offering ticket packages to winners and other prizes to runners-up before every home game.
