= Entain =

Manx gambling company

Entain plc
- Type: Public
- Traded as: LSE: ENT; FTSE 250 component
- ISIN: IM00B5VQMV65
- Industry: Gambling
- Predecessor: Gaming VC Holdings S.A. (2004–2010); GVC Holdings (2010–2020)
- Founded: 2004
- Headquarters: Douglas, Isle of Man
- Key people: Pierre Bouchut (Chairman); Stella David (CEO)
- Revenue: ▲£5,325.4 million (2025)
- Operating income: ▲£861.2million (2025)
- Net income: ▼£(680.5) million (2025)
- Number of employees: 30,000 (2025)
- Website: www.entaingroup.com

Entain plc, formerly GVC Holdings, is an international sports betting and gambling company. It is listed on the London Stock Exchange, trading under the ticker LON:ENT, and is a constituent of the FTSE 250 Index. It owns brands such as bwin, Coral, Ladbrokes, PartyPoker, and Sportingbet.

== History ==
The company was incorporated in Luxembourg in 2004 as Gaming VC Holdings S.A. It was founded by a group of four American businesspersons, led by Steve Barlow, as a vehicle to acquire Casino-Club, an online casino established in 2001 that was reportedly the largest online gambling operator in German-speaking countries. The company made its initial public offering on the AIM exchange on 21 December 2004, raising funds that were used to complete the €105-million acquisition of Casino-Club on the same day.

In 2010, Gaming VC was reorganised in the Isle of Man as GVC Holdings.

In 2012, GVC and William Hill bought Sportingbet, with William Hill taking the Australian and Spanish markets, and GVC taking the remaining international markets.

GVC acquired Bwin.Party Digital Entertainment in 2016 for £1.1 billion after a bidding battle with rival gambling group 888 Holdings, leading to a marked recovery in GVC's financial situation. After the acquisition, Bwin.Party returned to growth after many years of falling sales.

In December 2017, GVC agreed to buy Ladbrokes Coral in a deal which could be worth up to £4 billion. The acquisition was completed in March 2018.

In mid-2018 a shareholder rebellion forced out GVC director, Peter Isola, after reports showed that two executives at the company earned a disproportionate £67 million in salary.

In July 2018, GVC agreed to a $200-million deal with MGM Resorts International to capitalise on the newly liberalised US sports betting market.

In 2019, GVC chairman Lee Feldman left the company. While Feldman was overdue to leave under UK corporate governance code that recommends chairs of listed companies not stay in position longer than nine years, the news came two weeks after Feldman sold £6m worth of his GVC shares and CEO Kenny Alexander sold shares worth £13.7m, which led to GVC's share price falling nearly 14% in a single day. Barry Gibson took over as Chairman upon Feldman's departure.

In July 2020, Shay Segev, GVC's chief operating officer (COO), succeeded Alexander as CEO following his "surprise departure" after 13 years in charge. The same month, the UK tax authority HM Revenue and Customs announced that it was widening the scope of its investigation into “potential corporate offending” related to GVC's former Turkish-facing online gambling business, which it had sold in December 2017. GVC dismissed public reports that the HMRC probe was related to insolvent payment processor Wirecard, saying there was “no evidence of any link between the HMRC investigation and the payment service providers mentioned in the newspaper report.”

In December 2020, GVC Holdings changed its name to Entain plc. The rebranding was said to reflect a "new era of sustainability and conduct", including a commitment to operate only in regulated markets by 2023.

In 2021, Entain's joint venture partner MGM Resorts made an offer to buy Entain, valuing the business at $11 billion. The board and Segev rejected the offer saying, that it "significantly undervalues the company and its prospects". MGM Resorts subsequently withdrew the offer.

In January 2021, Segev stepped down as Entain CEO and was succeeded by Jette Nygaard-Andersen, who became the first woman to lead a UK-listed gambling company.

In March 2021, Entain acquired Swedish online gambling operator Enlabs AB-owner of brands including Optibet, Ninja Casino, Boost Casino Laimz and Nutz-in a deal valued at approximately £315 million (SEK 3.7 billion).

In August 2021, Entain acquired US-based esports betting company Unikrn for £50 million.

In November 2021, it was reported that Entain had sold the Betdaq business, which had been acquired by Ladbrokes eight years earlier, back to its original founder Dermot Desmond. The sale price was reportedly substantially less than £25 million the company was originally acquired for. Also in November 2021, Entain sold its InterTrader business to Raven Ventures International.

In February 2022, Entain acquired the Canadian sports betting operator Sports Interaction from Avid Gaming for £175 million.

In November 2022, Entain acquired the Croatian sports betting company, SuperSport.

In January 2023, Entain acquired the Dutch online gambling company, BetCity, from Sports Entertainment Media for £398 million.

In March 2023, Entain acquired the New Zealand based esports betting developer Sportsflare for CA$13.2m.

In July 2023, Entain acquired the London-based sports modelling and data analytics company Angstrom Sports for an initial £81m, with additional contingent payments of up to £122m over three years.

In December 2023, Nygaard-Andersen stepped down as Entain CEO and was succeeded on an interim basis by Stella David, a non-executive director of Entain. Nygaard-Andersen had been criticised by shareholders in relation to the company's poor business performance.

On 29 February 2024, Entain, announced its decision to withdraw from Responsible Wagering Australia, coinciding with the Australian government's preparations to implement stricter betting advertisement restrictions.

In April 2024, Entain announced that its interim CEO, Stella David, would succeed Barry Gibson as chairman, following Gibson's retirement in September.

In July 2024, Entain Plc appointed Gavin Isaacs as CEO, replacing interim CEO Stella David. Isaacs started his tenure as CEO on 2 September 2024.

In December 2024, Australian Transaction Reports and Analysis Centre (AUSTRAC), took legal action against Entain, for failing to meet anti-money laundering (AML) and counter-terrorism financing (CTF) requirements. The regulator accused Entain of inadequate checks on high-risk customers, including using pseudonyms to obscure identities. Isaacs warned of significant fines and said the company was cooperating fully while improving its compliance measures.

In April 2025 Entain named Stella David as its permanent chief executive, effective immediately. David, had twice served as interim CEO.

In July 2026, Entain announced it would cut 500 roles throughout its international operation, but said it was not in response to UK tax hikes.

== Operations ==
Entain is headquartered in the Isle of Man and employs over 30,000 staff in over 30 jurisdictions.

== Legal Issues ==
In December 2023, Entain entered into a deferred prosecution agreement (DPA) with the Crown Prosecution Service, the first of its kind in the United Kingdom. Entain was under investigation by HM Revenue & Customs, and the conduct which is the subject of the DPA relates to alleged failure by GVC to prevent bribery contrary to Section 7 of the Bribery Act 2010 between July 2011 and December 2017. Entain agreed to pay £615 million to suspend proceedings.

Entain, alongside, Flutter Entertainment, Tipico, and other gambling organisations, are currently facing major consumer claims in Germany. Lawyers claim that tens of thousands of gamblers are due a return of their losses because these betting operators were operating in Germany without a license. The EU Reporter estimates damages could reach around 1 billion Euros.

The gambling companies claim that they were eligible to operate across continental Europe due to their Maltese license, but the German courts have sided with the claimants. As a result, the case will now move up to the European Court of Justice.

== Entain-owned brands ==
Entain operates consumer-facing brands in the online gambling industry, including:

=== Sports labels ===
==== Betboo ====
Betboo was established in 2005 and provides online bingo, sportsbook, casino and poker to South American customers. It was acquired by the GVC Group in July 2009.

==== BetMGM ====
In July 2018, GVC announced a 50/50 joint venture with US Hotel and Casino operator MGM Resorts International to create a sports betting and online gaming platform targeting the U.S. market in states where such activities are legal.

==== bwin ====
bwin is Entain's main sports betting brand in continental Europe. Its core markets include Germany, Italy, Spain, France and Belgium. As well as sports bets, bwin has a variety of table and slot casino games as well as online poker where licensed to do so. The bwin brand has been associated with sponsorship of a number of football teams including Real Madrid, A.C. Milan, Bayern Munich, Manchester Utd and Juventus. The brand sponsors four Spanish La Liga clubs: Valencia CF, Villarreal CF, Sevilla FC and Atlético Madrid.

In February 2018, GVC Holdings was fined £350,000 by the UK Gambling Commission for repeated failings from ElectraWorks Limited. The company was punished for infringements relating to the advertising of free bets and bonus offers.

==== Sports Interaction ====
Sports Interaction is an online sports betting and casino brand that operates in Canada. Established in 1997, it is licensed under the Kahnawake Gaming Commission and in Ontario under iGaming Ontario.

In February 2022, Entain plc acquired Avid Gaming, the parent company of Sports Interaction, for approximately CAD $300 million.

==== BetCity ====
Dutch online casino and sportsbook BetCity.nl was acquired by Entain in January 2023. Entain initially paid €300 million for the acquisition, with the total cost potentially reaching €450 million based on BetCity’s future performance. BetCity was founded in 2020 by the Sports Entertainment Group (SEG), a Dutch company known for operating the football club FC Den Bosch. It launched as one of the first licensed online gambling platforms in the Netherlands.

In October 2025, BetCity was fined €2.65 million by the Dutch Gambling Authority (Kansspelautoriteit, Ksa) for violations of its duty of care towards players. According to the regulator, the operator failed to adequately monitor and intervene in cases of excessive gambling behaviour, particularly among young adults. BetCity filed an objection against the decision, which was subsequently rejected by the Ksa.

==== Gamebookers ====
Gamebookers is a full-service sportsbook that was initially acquired by PartyGaming in 2006. GVC then acquired the brand in February 2016 as part of the acquisition of bwin.party.

==== Ladbrokes & Coral ====
As of 29 March 2018, GVC Holdings took over the Ladbrokes Coral Group. This included their UK bookmaker estate, a new business for GVC bringing the two customer brands Ladbrokes and Coral into the corporate portfolio.

==== Neds ====
Neds was established in 2017 and serves the Australian sports betting market. It was acquired by GVC in 2018 for $A95 million.

==== Sportingbet ====
Sportingbet was established in 1998 and was acquired by GVC in March 2013. It provides online and mobile sports betting, casinos, games and poker. In October 2012, Sportingbet announced that it had agreed to preliminary terms for a £530 million takeover bid from both GVC and William Hill. Under these terms, Sportingbet's Australian and Spanish operations were bought by William Hill.

==== Optibet ====
Optibet is an online sports betting, casino, and poker brand operating primarily across the Baltic states of Latvia, Estonia, and Lithuania. Originally founded in Latvia in 1999-with the Optibet brand launched in 2008-it holds gambling licenses from the Lotteries and Gambling Supervisory Inspection of Latvia, the Estonian Tax and Customs Board and the Gaming Control Authority of Lithuania. In March 2021, Entain acquired Optibet as part of its £315 million (SEK 3.7 billion) takeover of parent company Enlabs AB.

=== Games labels ===
==== Party Poker ====
Party Poker was founded in 2001 and in the early 2000s was the world's largest online poker site. The company's US-driven revenues were hit by the passing of the Unlawful Internet Gambling Enforcement Act (UIGEA) in the United States. The company merged with Austrian sport's betting company bwin in 2011, and was acquired by GVC in 2015. In 2016 partypoker launched a windows mobile app and saw significant growth after bwin.party was acquired by GVC in the same year. In 2018, the partypoker brand was placed under the control of GVC's BetMGM joint venture.

==== Party Casino ====
Following the 2011 merger of PartyGaming PLC and bwin Interactive Entertainment AG, partycasino became one of GVC's leading casino brands.

==== CasinoClub ====
CasinoClub was originally launched in 2001 and acquired by GVC in 2004, it largely operates in German-speaking markets and has more than 15,000 active customers.

==== Gioco Digitale ====
Gioco Digitale was the first fully regulated gambling site on the Italian market launched in 2008. It has positioned itself as a gambling portal for casual users, with a focus on bingo and casino products. The company was originally acquired by bwin Interactive Entertainment AG in 2009.

==== Cashcade ====
Cashcade Ltd is a UK-based online gambling marketing company that is now a wholly owned subsidiary of GVC Holdings. Cashcade was originally acquired by PartyGaming PLC in July 2009. The company became part of the GVC group when it was purchased as part of the acquisition of bwin.party digital entertainment in February 2017. Cashcade owns FoxyGames.com, FoxyBingo.com and CheekyBingo.com.

==== Foxy Bingo ====
This online bingo site was first launched in 2005 and the brand is owned by Cashcade. During its advertising history it has had many campaigns featuring Foxy - a human-sized fox mascot. He wears a smart suit and has a northern accent. Throughout its brand history, there have been several celebrity tie-ups including with Katie Price and Joey Essex.

==== Foxy Games ====
Foxy Games was established in April 2015 as Foxy Casino and is the slots-led sister site of Foxy Bingo. The Foxy Casino product was later relaunched as Foxy Games, retaining the same casino-led focus as a sister site to Foxy Bingo. Foxy Bingo and Foxy Games subsequently introduced a shared wallet system, allowing customers to use a single account and balance across both brands.

==== Ninja Casino ====
Ninja Casino is a "Pay N Play" online casino and sports betting brand operating across Estonia, Finland, and Sweden. Launched in 2016 by Global Gaming, it holds gambling licenses from the Estonian Tax and Customs Board and the Swedish Gambling Authority. Enlabs AB acquired Ninja Casino in late 2020 through its takeover of Global Gaming, and the brand joined Entain in March 2021 as part of Entain's acquisition of Enlabs.
